= 2009 in baseball =

The following are the baseball events of the year 2009 throughout the world.

== Champions ==
=== Major League Baseball ===
- Regular Season Champions

League	Eastern Division Champions	Central Division Champions	Western Division Champions	Wild Card Qualifier
American League	New York Yankees	Minnesota Twins	Los Angeles Angels of Anaheim	Boston Red Sox
National League	Philadelphia Phillies	St. Louis Cardinals	Los Angeles Dodgers	Colorado Rockies

- World Series Champions – New York Yankees
  - American League Champions – New York Yankees
  - National League Champions – Philadelphia Phillies
- Postseason – October 7 to November 4

Division Series (ALDS, NLDS)
1	NY Yankees	3
3	Minnesota	0
American League
2	LA Angels	3
4	Boston	0
1	LA Dodgers	3
3	St. Louis	0
National League
2	Philadelphia	3
4	Colorado	1

League Championship Series (ALCS, NLCS)
1	NY Yankees	4
2	LA Angels	2
1	LA Dodgers	1
2	Philadelphia	4

World Series
AL1	NY Yankees	4
NL2	Philadelphia	2

Higher seed had home field advantage during Division Series and League Championship Series.
The American League champion has home field advantage during the World Series as a result of the AL victory in the All-Star Game.

=== Other Champions ===
- Minor League Baseball
  - AAA
    - Championship: Durham Bulls (Rays)
      - International League: Durham Bulls (Rays)
      - Pacific Coast League: Memphis Redbirds (Cardinals)
    - Mexican League: Saraperos de Saltillo
  - AA
    - Eastern League: Akron Aeros (Indians)
    - Southern League: Jacksonville Suns (Marlins)
    - Texas League: Midland RockHounds (Athletics)
  - A
    - California League: San Jose Giants (Giants)
    - Carolina League: Lynchburg Hillcats (Pirates)
    - Florida State League: Tampa Yankees (Yankees)
    - Midwest League: Fort Wayne TinCaps (Padres)
    - South Atlantic League: Lakewood BlueClaws (Phillies)
    - New York–Penn League: Staten Island Yankees (Yankees)
    - Northwest League: Salem-Keizer Volcanoes (Giants)
  - Rookie
    - Appalachian League: Danville Braves (Braves)
    - Gulf Coast League: GF Nationals (Nationals)
    - Pioneer League: Orem Owlz (Angels)
    - Arizona League: AZL Mariners (Mariners)
- Independent baseball leagues
  - Alaska Baseball League: Mat-Su Miners
  - American Association: Lincoln Saltdogs
  - Atlantic League: Somerset Patriots
  - Canadian-American Association: Quebec Capitales
  - Frontier League: Lake Erie Crushers
  - Golden Baseball League: Calgary Vipers
  - Northern League: Fargo-Moorhead RedHawks
  - United League Baseball: Amarillo Dillas
- Amateur
  - College
    - College World Series: LSU
    - NCAA Division II: Lynn University
    - NCAA Division III: St. Thomas
    - NAIA: Lubbock Christian
  - Youth
    - Big League World Series: Santiago, Dominican Republic
    - Junior League World Series: Scottsdale, Arizona
    - Little League World Series: Chula Vista, California
    - Senior League World Series: Houston, Texas
- International
  - National teams
    - World Baseball Classic: Japan
    - Baseball World Cup: United States
    - Asian Baseball Championship: Japan
  - International club team competitions
    - Asia Series: Yomiuri Giants, Japan
    - Caribbean Series: Tigres de Aragua, Venezuela
    - European Champion Cup Final Four: Nettuno, Italy
  - Domestic Leagues
    - Australia – Claxton Shield: Perth Heat
    - China Baseball League: Beijing Tigers
    - Cuban National Series: Habana
    - Dominican League: Tigres del Licey
    - France – Division Elite: Rouen Baseball 76
    - Holland Series: Neptunus
    - Italy – Serie A1: Fortitudo Bologna
    - Japanese Leagues:
      - Championship: Yomiuri Giants
      - Central League: Yomiuri Giants
      - Pacific League: Hokkaido Nippon-Ham Fighters
      - Most Valuable Players – Alex Ramírez (Central League) / Yu Darvish (Pacific League)
    - Korean Series: KIA Tigers
    - Mexican Pacific League: Venados de Mazatlán
    - Puerto Rican League: Leones de Ponce
    - Taiwan Series: Uni-President Lions
    - Venezuelan League: Tigres de Aragua

== Awards and honors ==
- Baseball Hall of Fame honors
  - Rickey Henderson and Jim Rice were elected by the Baseball Writers' Association of America;
    it was Henderson's first year of eligibility and Rice's last on the BBWAA ballot
    Joe Gordon was inducted following his election by the Veterans Committee
  - Nick Peters received the J. G. Taylor Spink Award
  - Tony Kubek received the Ford C. Frick Award.
- MVP Awards
  - American League – Joe Mauer (MIN)
  - National League – Albert Pujols (STL)
- Cy Young Awards
  - American League – Zack Greinke (KC)
  - National League – Tim Lincecum (SF)
- Rookie of the Year Awards
  - American League – Andrew Bailey (OAK)
  - National League – Chris Coghlan (FLA)
- Manager of the Year Awards
  - American League – Mike Scioscia (LAA)
  - National League – Jim Tracy (COL)
- Silver Slugger Awards

American League			National League
Player	Team	Position	Player	Team
Adam Lind	Toronto Blue Jays	DH / Pitcher	Carlos Zambrano	Chicago Cubs
Joe Mauer	Minnesota Twins	Catcher	Brian McCann	Atlanta Braves
Mark Teixeira	New York Yankees	1st baseman	Albert Pujols	St. Louis Cardinals
Aaron Hill	Toronto Blue Jays	2nd baseman	Chase Utley	Philadelphia Phillies
Evan Longoria	Tampa Bay Rays	3rd baseman	Ryan Zimmerman	Washington Nationals
Derek Jeter	New York Yankees	Shortstop	Hanley Ramírez	Florida Marlins
Jason Bay	Boston Red Sox	Left fielder	Ryan Braun	Milwaukee Brewers
Torii Hunter	Los Angeles Angels of Anaheim	Center fielder	Matt Kemp	Los Angeles Dodgers
Ichiro Suzuki	Seattle Mariners	Right fielder	Andre Ethier	Los Angeles Dodgers

- Gold Glove Awards

American League			National League
Player	Team	Position	Player	Team
Mark Buehrle	Chicago White Sox	Pitcher	Adam Wainwright	St. Louis Cardinals
Joe Mauer	Minnesota Twins	Catcher	Yadier Molina	St. Louis Cardinals
Mark Teixeira	New York Yankees	1st baseman	Adrián González	San Diego Padres
Plácido Polanco	Detroit Tigers	2nd baseman	Orlando Hudson	Los Angeles Dodgers
Evan Longoria	Tampa Bay Rays	3rd baseman	Ryan Zimmerman	Washington Nationals
Derek Jeter	New York Yankees	Shortstop	Jimmy Rollins	Philadelphia Phillies
Torii Hunter	Los Angeles Angels of Anaheim	Outfielder	Michael Bourn	Houston Astros
Adam Jones	Baltimore Orioles	Outfielder	Matt Kemp	Los Angeles Dodgers
Ichiro Suzuki	Seattle Mariners	Outfielder	Shane Victorino	Philadelphia Phillies

=== Others ===
- Woman Executive of the Year (major or minor league): Katie Dannemiller, Greensboro Grasshoppers, South Atlantic League

Major Leagues

- Branch Rickey Award – Torii Hunter (LAA, AL)
- Delivery Man of the Year Award – Mariano Rivera (NYY, AL)
- Hutch Award – Mark Teahen (CWS, AL)
- Luis Aparicio Award – Félix Hernández (SEA, AL)
- Roberto Clemente Award – Derek Jeter (NYY, AL)
- Players Choice Awards
  - Player of the Year – Albert Pujols (STL, NL)
  - Marvin Miller Man of the Year – Curtis Granderson (DET, AL)
  - Outstanding Players – Joe Mauer (MIN, AL) / Albert Pujols (STL, NL)
  - Outstanding Pitchers – Zack Greinke (KC, AL) / Adam Wainwright (STL, NL)
  - Outstanding Rookies – Gordon Beckham (CWS, AL) / J. A. Happ (PHI, NL)
  - Comeback players of the year – Aaron Hill (TOR, AL) / Chris Carpenter (STL, NL)
- Sporting News Awards
  - Player of the Year – Albert Pujols (STL, NL)
  - Managers of the Year – Mike Scioscia (AL, LAA) / Jim Tracy (NL, COL)
  - Pitchers of the Year – Zack Greinke (AL, KC) / Tim Lincecum (NL, SF)
  - Rookies of the Year – Gordon Beckham (AL, CWS) / J. A. Happ (NL, PHI)
  - Comeback players of the year – Aaron Hill (TOR, AL) / Chris Carpenter (STL, NL)
  - Relievers of the year – Mariano Rivera (AL, NYY) / Ryan Franklin (NL, STL)

Minor Leagues

- Baseball America Minor League Player of the Year Award – Jason Heyward (ATL)
- USA Today Minor League Player of the Year Award – Jason Heyward (ATL)

== Events ==
=== January ===
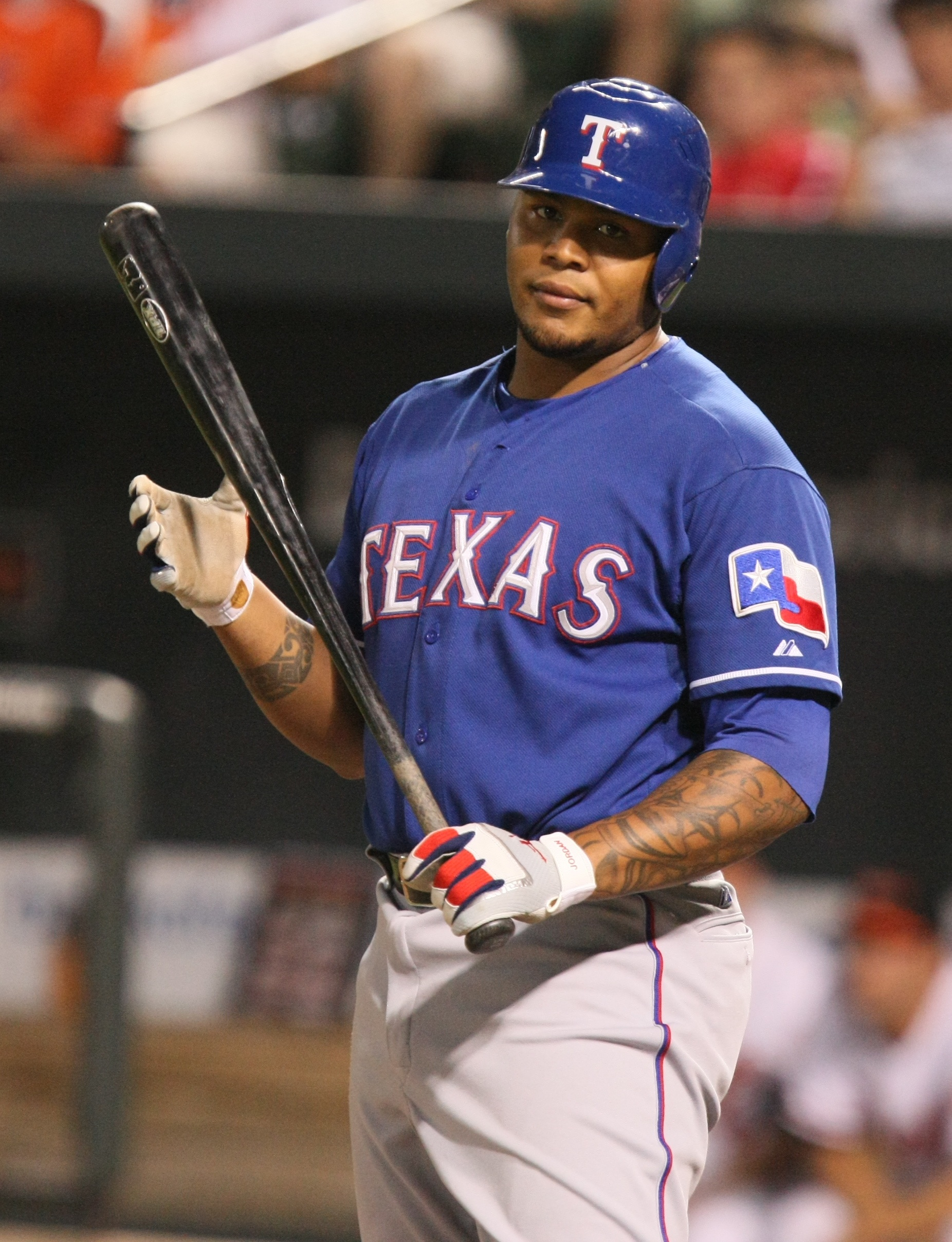
Andruw Jones signed with the Texas Rangers following his release from the Dodgers

- January 1 – Major League Baseball launches the MLB Network at 6 PM ET. Commissioner Bud Selig greets viewers at the channel's official inception.
- January 13 – Trevor Hoffman, the current all-time saves leader, signs a one-year $6 million deal with the Milwaukee Brewers.
- January 15 – The Los Angeles Dodgers reach an agreement with Andruw Jones to release him in time to catch on with another team before spring training in exchange for a deferral of some of the remaining money due on his contract.
- January 21 – In his first year of arbitration eligibility, closer Jonathan Papelbon and the Boston Red Sox agree to a $6.25 million, one-year contract that avoids salary arbitration. Just one day after Bobby Jenks does the same ($5.65 million), Papelbon easily surpasses Éric Gagné's previous major league mark of $5 million for a reliever with three years of service time. Francisco Rodríguez made $3.775 million in his first year of arbitration.
- January 22 -Jeff Kent announces his retirement after 17 seasons. He hit more home runs than any other second baseman in major league history.
- January 25 – Three time All-Star Sean Casey announces his retirement after twelve seasons, later joining the MLB Network staff.

=== February ===
- February 3
  - Joe Torre and Tom Verducci's book, The Yankee Years hits book stores. The book chronicles Torre's years as manager of the New York Yankees from 1996 to 2007. In the book, Joe Torre says he feels that general manager Brian Cashman "betrayed" him in negotiations with the Yankees following the 2007 season, and that teammates refer to Alex Rodriguez as "A-Fraud".
  - A urine sample that Barry Bonds submitted as part of Major League Baseball's anonymous testing program in 2003 that did not show the presence of performance-enhancing drugs under that program is retested by federal authorities after it is seized in a 2004 raid, and comes back positive for anabolic steroids, according to a New York Times report.
  - Óliver Pérez re-signs with the New York Mets with a three-year $36 million deal.
- February 4
  - The list of victims of Bernard Madoff's Ponzi scheme is revealed, and includes Sandy Koufax and Sterling Equities Associates, the New York Mets' ownership group.
  - San Diego Padres slugger Adrián González sets a Caribbean Series record with three home runs in a game and Mexico's Venados de Mazatlán beats the Dominican Republic's Tigres del Licey, 12–9. González has a two-run homer in the fourth inning and a solo shot in the sixth and ninth innings. Forty-seven players had hit two home runs in a Series game over its previous fifty editions.

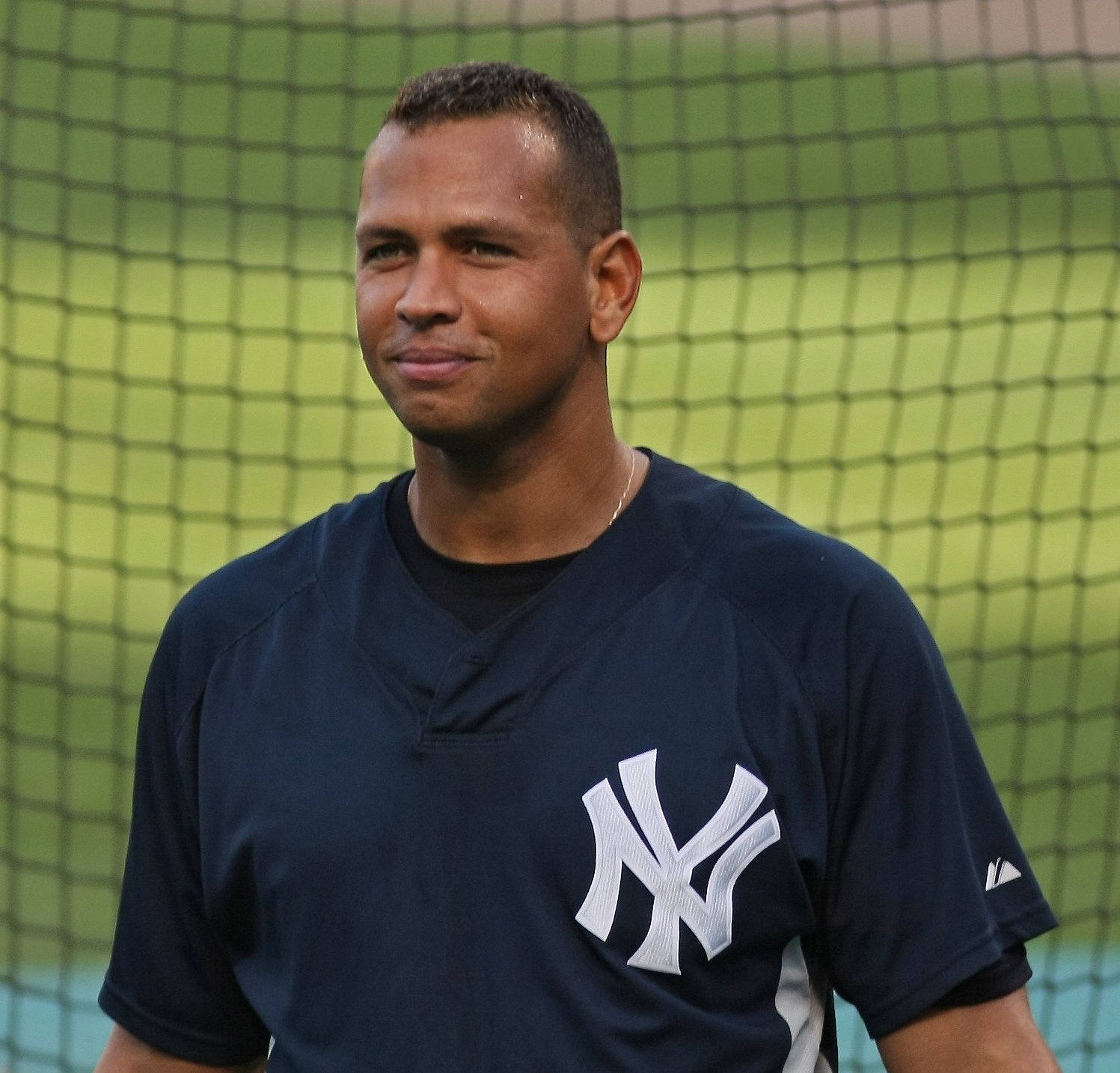
A-Rod had a busy month of February

- February 7 – Sports Illustrated reports that Alex Rodriguez tested positive for steroids in 2003.
- February 8 – Andruw Jones signs a one-year minor league contract offer from the Texas Rangers. Jones' deal pays him $500,000 if he makes the major league team. He also has the chance to make $1 million in incentives throughout the season.
- February 9 – Alex Rodriguez admits in an interview to ESPN's Peter Gammons that while with the Texas Rangers during the 2001–2003 seasons he used performance-enhancing drugs.
- February 17 – Alex Rodriguez meets the press at George M. Steinbrenner Field to discuss his admission of having used performance-enhancing drugs to ESPN's Peter Gammons. Rodriguez claims that a cousin repeatedly injected him with drugs obtained over the counter in the Dominican Republic called "Boli", a likely reference to Primobolan.
- February 18
  - Ken Griffey Jr. returns to the Seattle Mariners, agreeing to a one-year deal that includes a $2 million base salary and up to $2.5 million in incentives based on at-bats and attendance.
  - The demolition of Shea Stadium is completed.

=== March ===
- March 1
  - Jim Bowden resigns after four seasons as the Washington Nationals general manager, leaving under the cloud of a federal investigation into the skimming of signing bonuses given to Latin American prospects.
  - Following an afternoon spring training game at Ed Smith Stadium, New York Yankees third baseman Alex Rodriguez meets with officials from MLB's Department of Investigations and Labor Relations Department about security issues and his past involvement with performance-enhancing drugs.
- March 3 – Major League Baseball 2K9 is released by Visual Concepts and 2K Sports for Microsoft Windows, the Xbox 360, Sony's PlayStation 3, PlayStation 2 and PlayStation Portable, and the Nintendo Wii. 2008 Cy Young Award winner Tim Lincecum of the San Francisco Giants appears on the cover as well as serving as MLB player consultant for the popular video game.
- March 4 – The Los Angeles Dodgers and free agent left fielder Manny Ramírez agree in principle on a two-year, $45 million deal.
- March 5 – The 2009 World Baseball Classic opens in Tokyo with defending champions Japan defeating China.
- March 6
  - Los Angeles Dodgers pinch hitter Mark Sweeney announces his retirement and becomes a member of Joe Torre's coaching staff with the Dodgers. Sweeney's 175 career pinch hits rank second in major league history. Lenny Harris, the all-time pinch-hits leader (212), is also a member of the Dodgers' coaching staff, as is Manny Mota, who ranks third on the career list (155).
  - Ripken Baseball and MLB.com announce a multi-year agreement to jointly operate a new youth baseball instructional website, GetGreat.com.
- March 10 – For the second time in three days, the Netherlands upsets the heavily favored Dominican Republic at the 2009 World Baseball Classic. The Dutch advance to the second round and the Dominicans are eliminated.
- March 22 – Team USA is eliminated from the World Baseball Classic with a 9–4 loss to Japan in Los Angeles.
- March 23
  - After having missed the entire 2008 season with right shoulder problems, Boston Red Sox pitcher Curt Schilling announces his retirement from baseball.
  - Japan wins the 2009 World Baseball Classic with a 5–3 victory over South Korea in ten innings. Ichiro Suzuki hits a two-run single in the top of the tenth inning with two outs for the winning runs. Daisuke Matsuzaka is the tournament's Most Valuable Player for the second time. Dice-K posts a 3–0 record with a 2.45 ERA in the tournament.
- March 26 – Eri Yoshida pitches for the Kobe 9 Cruise at the Osaka Dome in the season opening game of the newly formed Kansai Independent Baseball League.
- March 31
  - The Detroit Tigers release OF/DH Gary Sheffield after he bats only .178 (8-for-45) during spring training. He signs a one-year deal with the New York Mets on April 1.
  - The Atlanta Braves extend Chipper Jones' contract through the 2013 season.

=== April ===
- April 6 – Switch-hitters Tony Clark and Felipe López of the Arizona Diamondbacks become the first teammates to each hit homers from both sides of the plate on Opening Day.
- April 9 – In the early morning hours after pitching six shutout innings against the Oakland Athletics, rookie Angels starter Nick Adenhart and two others are killed when the car in which they are travelling is struck by a drunk driver. The series finale with Oakland that evening is subsequently postponed. This marks the second time a player's death in a car accident postpones a series finale.
- April 11
  - Commissioner Bud Selig announces that the 2011 MLB All-Star Game will be played at Arizona's Chase Field.
  - Brandon Inge of the Detroit Tigers hits his 100th career home run, leading the Tigers to a 4–3 victory over the Texas Rangers.
- April 12 – In a 2–0 loss to the Cincinnati Reds, the Pittsburgh Pirates turn the first triple play of the season, 6–4–3.
- April 13
  - For the Pittsburgh Pirates' home opener against the Houston Astros, the Pirates wear the caps of the Pittsburgh Police Department (PPD) which had lost three officers and had two injured in a shootout on April 4, 2009. The Astros also wore these caps before the game, won 7–0 by the Pirates.
  - For the first time in Major League history, century milestone home runs are hit in consecutive at-bats—and the two players involved reach the same milestone. Batting against Zach Miner of the Detroit Tigers, Jermaine Dye of the Chicago White Sox leads off the second inning with his 300th career home run. Paul Konerko follows with his 300th career home run one batter later. The White Sox defeat the Tigers at Comerica Park 10–6.
  - The San Diego Padres's Jody Gerut hits the first home run at CitiField in the first at-bat in the New York Mets' new home. The first home run by a Met is a three-run shot in the fifth inning by third baseman David Wright, tying the game at 5–5. The Mets, however, surrender the lead an inning later when right fielder Ryan Church misplays a fly ball that leads to an unearned run that is the deciding factor in the Padres' 6–5 victory. It is the second consecutive game lost in this manner by the Mets, as the previous day in Florida, left fielder Daniel Murphy committed an error that led to both runs in the Florida Marlins' 2–1 victory over the Mets.
  - Harry Kalas, 73, play-by-play announcer for the Philadelphia Phillies, dies of a heart attack after collapsing in the broadcast booth at Nationals Park before the game with the Washington Nationals.
- April 15 – In honor of Jackie Robinson, the first African-American to play Major League Baseball, all players on all teams wear his number, 42. It was retired from all teams throughout baseball on its 50th anniversary in 1997 and April 15 is the only day players are allowed to wear it, in honor of his debut on April 15, 1947 (see also Jackie Robinson Day).
- April 16 – The New York Yankees play their first game at the new Yankee Stadium, losing to the Cleveland Indians 10–2.
- April 17
  - Gary Sheffield of the New York Mets hits his 500th career home run as a pinch hitter in the bottom of the seventh inning in a game against the Milwaukee Brewers.
  - Jason Kubel completes the ninth cycle in Minnesota Twins' history with a go-ahead grand slam to cap off a seven-run eighth inning for Minnesota. Kubel had five RBIs to lift the Twins to an 11–9 victory over the Los Angeles Angels. He joins just five other American League batters to fill the 'HR' slot in the cycle with a grand slam, most recently Miguel Tejada in 2001.
  - Adam Dunn and Ryan Zimmerman of the Washington Nationals both take the field wearing home uniforms with the team name spelled "Natinals". The players changed into jerseys with the correct spelling during the game when the error was caught.
- April 18 – The Cleveland Indians rout the New York Yankees 22–4 at the New Yankee Stadium. Asdrúbal Cabrera clubs a grand slam in the Indians 14-run explosion in the second inning. The Indians are the first team since the Boston Red Sox on June 27, 2003 to tally 14 runs in an inning. The Red Sox did it in the first inning. No team ever scored more than 13 runs in an inning against the Yankees at the Old Yankee Stadium; this occurrence was in just the 3rd game ever played at the New Yankee Stadium. In total, Cleveland bangs out 6 homers and has 25 hits.
- April 25 – Albert Pujols hits his 8th career grand slam, giving him 1,002 RBIs and becoming the 260th player overall and only the 6th St. Louis Cardinals' player to reach 1,000 RBIs.
- April 26 – Boston Red Sox centerfielder Jacoby Ellsbury steals home against Andy Pettitte and the New York Yankees at Fenway Park in the bottom of the fifth inning of the Red Sox's 4–1 victory. It was the first steal of home by a Red Sox player since José Offerman did so on the front end of a double steal on August 30, 1999 against the Kansas City Royals. It was the first pure steal of home by a Red Sox player since Billy Hatcher did it against Chuck Finley and the California Angels on April 22, 1994. This marks the third time Pettitte has allowed a steal of home, the first two being Mike Sweeney of the Kansas City Royals on August 14, 2002, and Aaron Hill of the Toronto Blue Jays on May 29, 2007.

=== May ===
- May 3
  - Carl Crawford ties the modern-day Major League record by stealing six bases in the Tampa Bay Rays' 5–3 win over the Boston Red Sox in front of 32,332 at Tropicana Field. Catcher Michel Hernandez and shortstop Jason Bartlett also steal a base each to give the Rays a club-record eight stolen bases. Crawford is 4-for-4 with an RBI and joins Eddie Collins (twice, in 1912), Otis Nixon (1991), and Eric Young (1996) as the only players to steal six bases in a game.
  - A-Rod: The Many Lives of Alex Rodriguez by Selena Roberts hits book stores. The unauthorized biography links the embattled slugger's tabloid-like fame and use of performance-enhancing drugs with an unquenchable desire for attention, and his father, Victor, who abandoned him at ten years old. It also delves into details of the leaked allegations that A-Rod used PEDs with the New York Yankees and tipped pitches to opposing players.

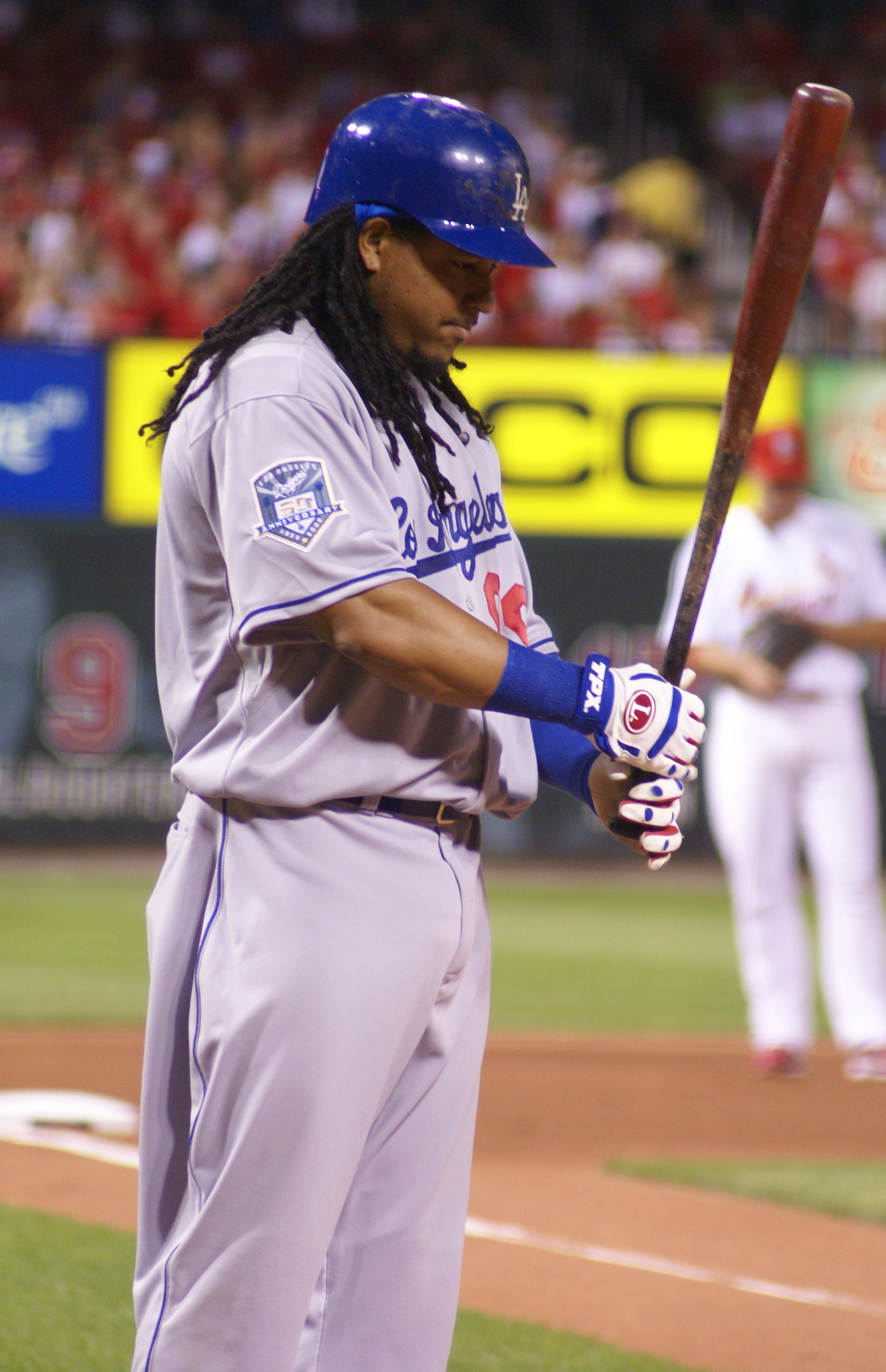
Manny Ramirez

- May 4 – The Los Angeles Dodgers beat the Arizona Diamondbacks 7–2 at Dodger Stadium, setting a National League record for the longest home win streak at the start of the season with eleven. Three previous NL teams started the season 10–0 at home—the 1918 New York Giants at the Polo Grounds, the 1970 Chicago Cubs at Wrigley Field and the 1983 Atlanta Braves (also managed by Joe Torre) at Fulton County Stadium.
- May 6 – At Dodger Stadium, the Los Angeles Dodgers beat the Washington Nationals, 10–3, to set the modern Major League record for home wins to start the season, improving to 13–0 to surpass the 1911 Detroit Tigers. In 1880, the Chicago White Stockings won 21 in a row at home to start the season.
- May 7
  - Major League Baseball suspends Dodgers outfielder Manny Ramirez for fifty games for use of performance-enhancing drugs. The Dodgers lose their first game without their star left fielder 11–9 to the last-place Washington Nationals, ending their thirteen-game home winning streak to start the season.
  - Bob Melvin is fired as manager of the Arizona Diamondbacks, becoming the first manager fired in 2009. He will be replaced by A. J. Hinch.
  - New York Mets shortstop José Reyes is called for obstruction of Philadelphia Phillies base-runner Shane Victorino. Mets manager Jerry Manuel is ejected from the game for arguing the play, and following his ejection, brushes umpire Bill Welke's cap with the bill of his own cap. Instant replay shows that Victorino was actually the one who initiated contact with Reyes during the rundown play. The following batter, Jayson Werth, hits a two-run home run to bring the Phillies to within two runs of the Mets. The Mets hold on for a 7–5 victory. Manuel is suspended one game for the incident (May 9), and fined an undisclosed amount.
  - At Fenway Park, twelve batters come up and all twelve score before the Boston Red Sox make their first out more than half an hour into the bottom of the sixth inning of a 13–3 win over the Cleveland Indians. The Red Sox break the American League record of 11 runs in an inning before making an out, set by the 1925 Detroit Tigers, who scored 11 runs in the sixth inning in a 19–1 win against the New York Yankees on June 17, 1925. Boston ties the modern major league mark of 12, set by the 1953 Brooklyn Dodgers on May 24, 1953, in the eighth inning of a 16–2 win at the Philadelphia Phillies, according to Elias Sports Bureau.
- May 10 – Liván Hernández of the New York Mets wins his 150th game.
- May 12 – Roger Clemens appears on Mike and Mike on ESPN Radio and ESPN2 in response to American Icon: The Fall of Roger Clemens and the Rise of Steroids in America's Pastime written by the New York Daily News, which hit bookstores that day. In his first high-profile media appearance since denying steroid use during his January 6, 2008 interview on 60 Minutes, he maintains his innocence and repeats his denial that Brian McNamee injected him with performance-enhancing drugs. On February 13, 2008, Clemens testified under oath at a Congressional hearing that he has never used performance-enhancing drugs.

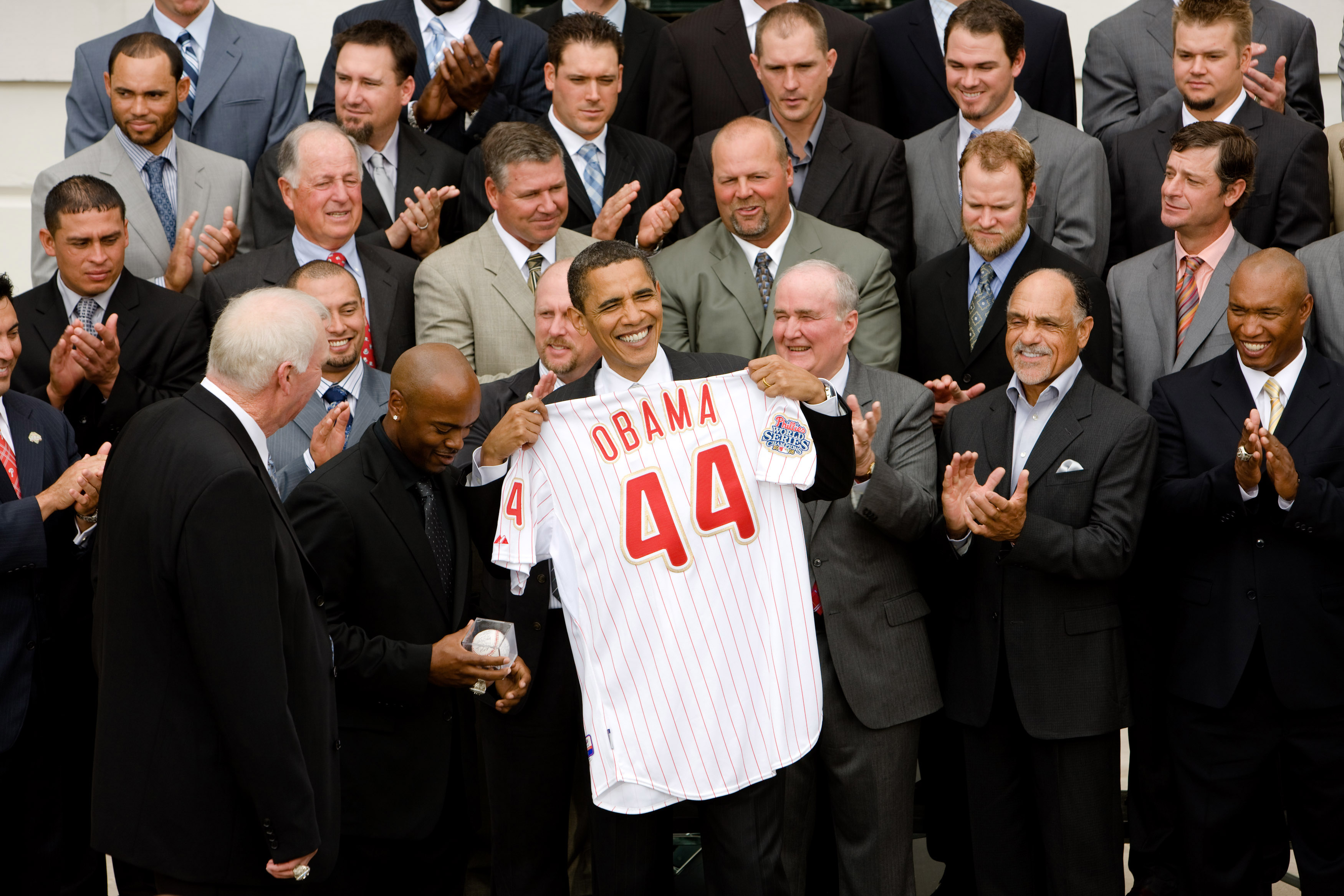
President Obama is presented with jersey number 44 from the Philadelphia Phillies during their visit to the White House

- May 13 – The Pittsburgh Pirates' Adam LaRoche's first-inning two-run home run against the St. Louis Cardinals is ruled a double following instant replay review. He is the first player to ever have a home run taken away by instant replay. Later in the same night, the Florida Marlins' Ross Gload's home run against the Milwaukee Brewers is also overturned upon instant replay review.
- May 14 – The 2008 World Series Champion Philadelphia Phillies are honored at the White House by President Barack Obama.
- May 15 – The Detroit Tigers hit 2 grand slams in a game, only the third time in team history.
- May 17 – After the Cleveland Indians bat in the top of the first inning at Tropicana Field, Indians manager Eric Wedge calls the umpires together to question the Tampa Bay Rays' lineup. The lineup card shows Ben Zobrist and Evan Longoria both at third base (Longoria was supposed to be the designated hitter). Joe Maddon's lineup card mixup results in Rays starting pitcher Andy Sonnanstine being used in the third spot of the order. With the Rays up 6–3 in the fourth inning, Sonnastine doubles in a run.
- May 20 – Dontrelle Willis pitches 6 1/3 innings of one-hit ball to earn his first victory since September 25, 2007, and his first in a Detroit Tigers uniform.
- May 21
  - Cleveland Indians prospect Jeanmar Gómez, pitching for the Akron Aeros, gives them their first perfect game in franchise history, shutting down the Trenton Thunder, 3–0, in the Eastern League. The 21-year-old righty, signed by Cleveland as an undrafted free agent from Venezuela, strikes out eight in 87 pitches over nine innings, while recording nine ground ball outs and 10 fly ball outs against the host Thunder, a New York Yankees affiliate. Gómez's record improves to 4–0 with an 0.31 ERA since moving up to Double-A Akron earlier in the season.
  - Eighteen-year-old left-hander Jordan Wiener pitches a no-hitter for Robert F. Kennedy High School against Prospect Heights High School in the first round of the PSAL Class B playoffs one day after burying his father. On May 17, Jordan's father, Mitchell Wiener, became New York City's first fatality from swine flu. Jordan will throw out the first pitch May 31 at Citi Field before the New York Mets vs. Florida Marlins game.
- May 22 – Michael Cuddyer hits for the cycle in the Minnesota Twins' 11–3 victory over the Milwaukee Brewers at the Hubert H. Humphrey Metrodome. Cuddyer joins Jason Kubel as the second Twin to hit for the cycle this season, and is the tenth in team history. The last teammates to hit for the cycle in the same season were Vladimir Guerrero and Brad Wilkerson of the 2003 Montreal Expos. Kubel's cycle came against the Los Angeles Angels on April 17 at the Metrodome.
- May 27 – With the Chicago Cubs up 2–1 over the Pittsburgh Pirates and a runner on third, Carlos Zambrano throws a pitch in the dirt to batter Nate McLouth. Nyjer Morgan, the runner on third, breaks for home. Catcher Geovany Soto flips the ball to Zambrano covering at the plate, but Morgan appears to sneak his left hand in, and is called safe by home plate umpire Mark Carlson. Zambrano disagrees with this call and argues with Carlson. During the argument, Zambrano and Carlson make contact, and Zambrano is ejected from the game. Zambrano goes off in a tirade that includes him ejecting Carlson, throwing the baseball in the air toward the outfield, slamming his glove on the ground and beating a Gatorade machine in the dugout with a baseball bat. The following day, he received a six-game suspension and an undisclosed fine for "inappropriate and violent actions on the field and in the dugout" from Major League Baseball vice president of on-field operations Bob Watson.
- May 29 – Clint Hurdle is fired as manager of the Colorado Rockies, making him the second manager fired this season. He will be replaced by former Dodgers and Pirates manager Jim Tracy.
- May 30 – A 25 inning marathon between the University of Texas at Austin and Boston College becomes the longest baseball game in NCAA Division I history. Texas Longhorns closer Austin Wood enters the game with one out in the seventh inning, and pitches 12 1/3 innings of no-hit ball before surrendering a single in the 19th inning to Tony Sanchez. Longhorns Second baseman Tony Tucker singles in Connor Rowe in the top of the 25th, and Austin Dicharry retires Boston 1–2–3 in the bottom of the inning to secure the 3–2 victory.
- May 31 – Philadelphia Phillies starter Jamie Moyer goes six innings and gives up one earned run to earn his 250th career victory over the Washington Nationals, 4–2.

=== June ===
- June 1 – The New York Yankees set a Major League record by playing their 18th consecutive errorless game. The streak ends the following day when Jorge Posada commits a throwing error in the fourth inning. The old record was set by the 2006 Boston Red Sox, who went seventeen straight games without an error.
- June 2 – The 11-year-old son of Colorado Rockies catcher Yorvit Torrealba and two uncles, who were taking him to school, are kidnapped in Guarenas, Venezuela. The three are rescued the following evening when authorities posing as representatives of Torrealba paid a portion of the two million bolivares (about $931,000 U.S.) that the kidnappers had demanded in ransom. Upon receiving an undisclosed amount short of what they had sought, the culprits fled and left Torrealba's son and his two uncles on a highway in Araira. A police spokesman states afterward that six alleged kidnappers have been identified, but have not been captured.
- June 3 – In a surprise move, the Atlanta Braves release pitcher Tom Glavine. Since returning to the Braves, Glavine made only thirteen starts in 2008, and had yet to pitch at the major league level in 2009. The 305-game winner was on the verge of coming back from shoulder and elbow surgery. The previous night, in his third rehab start, Glavine threw six scoreless innings for the Class-A Rome Braves, and proclaimed himself ready to pitch in the majors again. Instead, the Braves called up top prospect Tommy Hanson to start that weekend against the Milwaukee Brewers. In another transaction, the Braves acquired All-Star center fielder Nate McLouth from the Pittsburgh Pirates for three prospects: outfielder Gorkys Hernández and pitchers Jeff Locke and Charlie Morton.

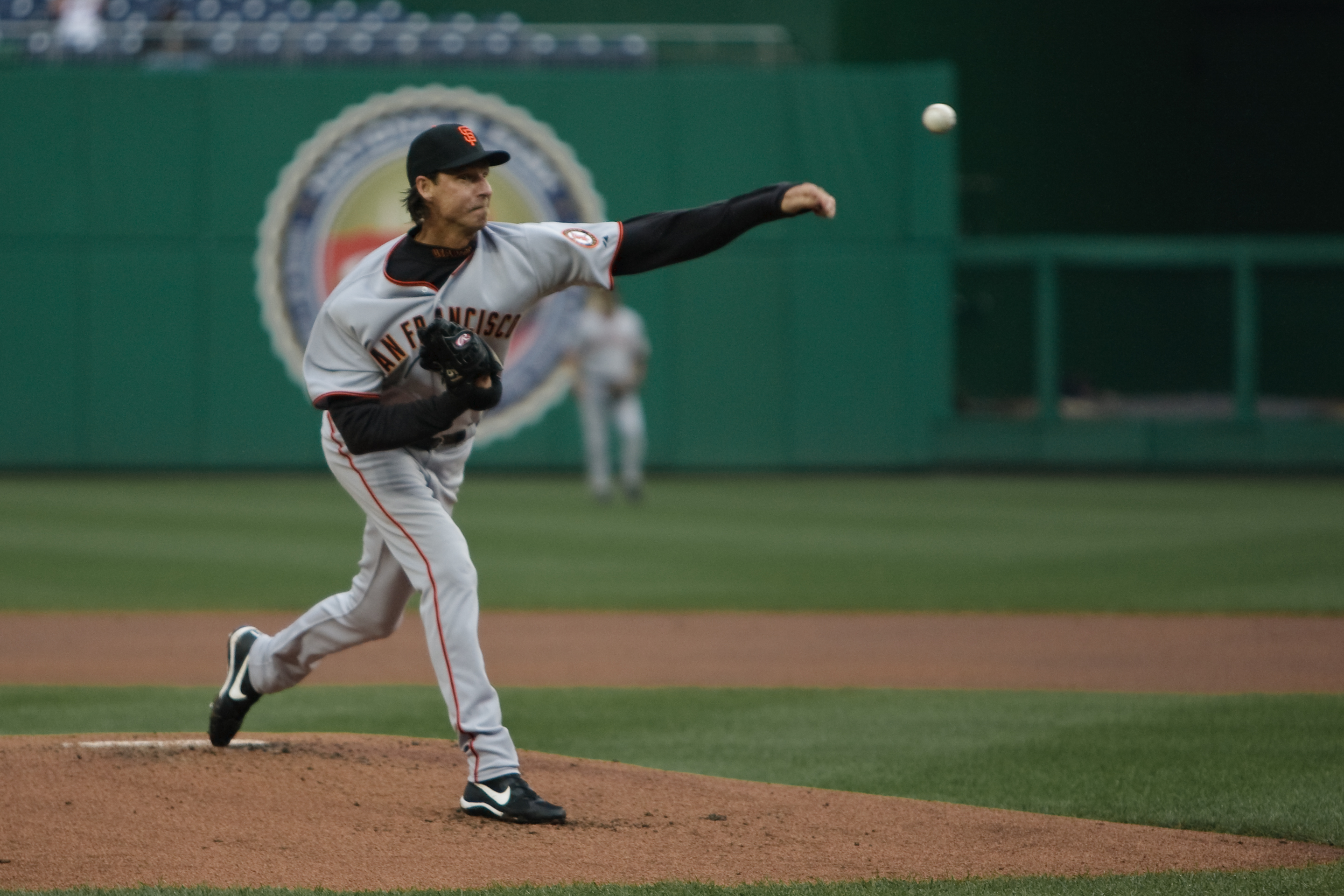
Johnson defeated the Washington Nationals on June 4, 2009 to become the 24th member of the 300 win club

- June 4
  - The San Francisco Giants' Randy Johnson pitches six innings to become the 24th pitcher in Major League history to win 300 games, limiting the Washington Nationals to an unearned run and two hits in the Giants' 5–1 victory.
  - The Pittsburgh Pirates' Andrew McCutchen makes his Major League debut and racks up two singles, one RBI, three runs scored and a stolen base in four at-bats in an 11–6 win over the New York Mets.
  - Tom Kahl throws the first pitch for the Butler BlueSox of the Prospect League in their inaugural game at the newly renovated Pullman Park. He pitches a six-inning no-hitter until he is benched in the seventh. The BlueSox go on to beat the NorthCoast Knights 2–0.
  - Alex Rios of the Toronto Blue Jays strikes out five times in a 6–5 loss to the Los Angeles Angels, becoming the first major leaguer to accomplish the dubious feat twice in a career after doing so in a game in 2006.
- June 6 – For the second day in a row, Brad Lidge of the Philadelphia Phillies blows a save against Andre Ethier and the Los Angeles Dodgers. On June 5, with two out, the bases loaded and the Dodgers down by a run, Ethier hit a line drive to right field to drive in Casey Blake and James Loney for the Dodgers' 4–3 walk off victory. Today, with a save opportunity, Lidge gives up a solo home run to Rafael Furcal in the ninth inning that ties the game at two. In the twelfth inning, Ethier hits his second home run of the day (the first being in the fourth inning) off Chad Durbin to give the Dodgers the 3–2 walk off victory.
- June 9 – The Washington Nationals select San Diego State right-handed pitcher Stephen Strasburg with the first overall pick in the 2009 Major League Baseball draft. The third pick, taken by the San Diego Padres is outfielder Donavan Tate, son of former Tampa Bay Buccaneers running back Lars Tate.
- June 11 – With the score tied at 3 in the tenth inning at Progressive Field, the Cleveland Indians' Shin-Soo Choo singles sharply up the middle straight toward a flock of seagulls that were lounging in center field. Kansas City Royals centerfielder Coco Crisp misplays the ball when it deflects off a seagull flying away. On the play, Mark DeRosa scores the winning run for the Indians.
- June 12 – With two outs in the bottom of the ninth inning, and the New York Mets leading the Yankees 8–7, Luis Castillo drops a routine fly ball that allows the tying and winning runs to score for the Yankees. It goes down as Francisco Rodriguez's first "blown save" of the season.
- June 13 – Lance Berkman of the Houston Astros hits his 300th career home run against Arizona Diamondbacks starter Jon Garland. Miguel Tejada also records his 2000th career hit off Garland right before Berkman's home run.
- June 14 – The 1909 World Series' 100th anniversary is celebrated, when the Tigers and Pirates play each other in Pittsburgh. Both teams wear throwback uniforms similar to those worn in 1909. The stadium's public address and sound systems are also turned off, simulating the game conditions in 1909. The Pirates win the game, 6–3.
- June 16 – According to a report published on The New York Times Web site, Sammy Sosa is allegedly among the 104 Major League players who tested positive for PEDs in 2003. Sosa testified under oath before Congress at a public hearing in 2005 that he had never taken illegal performance-enhancing drugs.
- June 17
  - In the place where his career began as a 19-year-old rookie, Iván Rodríguez sets the record for the most games caught, with 2,227. The Houston Astros lose 5–4 to the Texas Rangers in ten innings in Arlington, Texas.
  - At Fenway Park, the Boston Red Sox celebrate their 500th consecutive sellout, the longest sellout streak in major league history, with a 6–1 victory over the Florida Marlins. Starter Brad Penny labors through five innings to earn his 100th career victory. The previous record of 455 straight sellouts was set by the Cleveland Indians in 2001. The only other sports teams to sell out more games in a row were the NBA's Portland Trail Blazers (744), Boston Celtics (567) and Chicago Bulls (515).

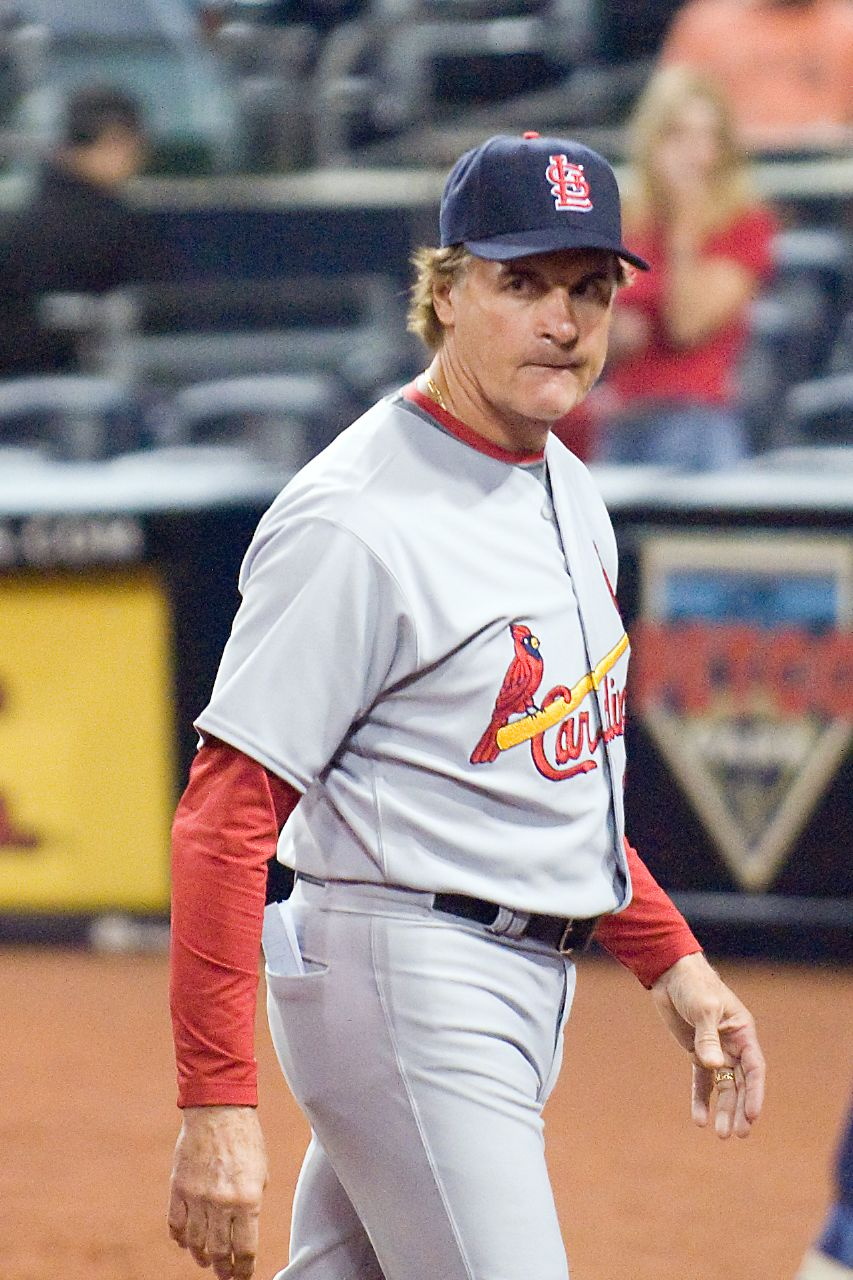
Tony La Russa is the 3rd winningest manager in MLB history

- June 19
  - Albert Pujols scores his 1,000th career run on Ryan Ludwick's first career grand slam, against Pujols' hometown, Kansas City.
  - Instant replay is used twice in the Detroit Tigers' 10–4 victory over the Milwaukee Brewers at Comerica Park, the first time that's happened in league history. Miguel Cabrera's third-inning single off the top of the wall is called a home run after instant replay review shows that it had actually cleared the wall. Contrarily, Dusty Ryan's fourth-inning home run is overturned to a ground rule double. The game is called with one out in the seventh inning due to rain.
- June 20
  - The Northern Division wins the 48th annual Florida State League All-Star game at Hammond Stadium in Fort Myers, 6–4. Daytona Cubs shortstop Starlin Castro goes four for four with an inside-the-park home run to be named the game's MVP. Fort Myers Miracle first baseman Chris Parmelee wins the home run derby held before the game.
  - In the third annual Civil Rights Game, the Chicago White Sox defeat the Cincinnati Reds, 10–8, at Great American Ball Park in Cincinnati.
- June 21 – Tony La Russa records his 2500th victory as a manager as the St. Louis Cardinals defeat the Kansas City Royals 12–5 at Kauffman Stadium. He becomes the third manager in Major League Baseball to reach this milestone, joining Connie Mack (3,831) and John McGraw (2,763).
- June 23
  - The Northern Division survives a back-and-forth baseball battle for an 8–7 come-from-behind victory over the South in the 50th annual South Atlantic League All-Star Game. Lake County Captains second baseman Karexon Sanchez goes 2-for-2 with two RBIs, two runs, two walks and a stolen base to earn Most Valuable Player honors. West Virginia Power first baseman Calvin Anderson wins the home run derby held before the game with 13.
  - West Michigan Whitecaps Ronnie Bourquin's three-run home run in the fourth inning carries the East Division to a 6–3 victory over the West in the 45th Midwest League All-Star Game. The Peoria Chiefs' Sawyer Carroll went 4-for-4 with two stolen bases and a run scored to be named the "Star of Stars".
  - After going 0–3 with three strike outs, Lancaster JetHawks outfielder Jonathan Gaston leads off the bottom of the 10th inning of the California League/Carolina League All-Star Game with a home run to give California a 2–1 victory over Carolina. Gaston also recorded an outfield assist, catching the Potomac Nationals' Michael Burgess trying to extend a single into a double in the seventh inning, and was named the All-Star MVP.
- June 26 – Kevin Millwood of the Texas Rangers wins his 150th game.
- June 28
  - The Tampa Bay Rays become the fastest team in major league history to reach 100 home runs and 100 stolen bases when B. J. Upton homers on the first pitch in the bottom of the third off Andrew Miller of the Florida Marlins. It is the Rays' 100th this season. Tampa Bay, which started the game with 116 steals, accomplishes the feat in 77 games. The previous fastest were the 1977 Cincinnati Reds and 1994 Cleveland Indians, who both did it in 84 games, according to Stats LLC. The only other two teams to reach the 100–100 mark by the All-Star break since 1954 were the Florida Marlins (2003) and the Toronto Blue Jays (1998).
  - New York Yankees closer Mariano Rivera records the final four outs of a 4–2 Yankees victory over their cross-town rival New York Mets at Citi Field for his 500th career save. Also, in the visitors' half of the ninth inning, Rivera works a seven-pitch walk with the bases loaded against Mets closer Francisco Rodriguez to earn his first career RBI.
- June 30 – Trailing 10–1 entering the bottom of the seventh inning, the Baltimore Orioles score five runs in the seventh inning and five runs in the eighth inning to defeat the Boston Red Sox, 11–10. The Orioles' comeback represents the largest comeback in team history, and the largest comeback of a last-place team over a first-place team in Major League Baseball history.

=== July ===
- July 1
  - Construction begins for the long-awaited Florida Marlins ballpark, as crews arrive at the former Miami Orange Bowl site to begin preparations for the project. The Marlins plan to move into the new 37,000-seat retractable-roof stadium in time for the 2012 season.
  - The North Division holds on for a 2–1 victory over the South in the Texas League All-Star Game before a crowd of 10,314 at Dr Pepper Ballpark. Northwest Arkansas Naturals third baseman Corey Smith goes 2-for-3 and scores the game's first run to be named MVP.
- July 4 – Adam Dunn of the Washington Nationals hits his 300th home run off Atlanta Braves starter Tommy Hanson.
- July 7 – Immediately after entering in the eighth inning of a 4–4 tie with the Washington Nationals with two outs and Austin Kearns on first base, Alan Embree picks off Kearns to end the inning. In the bottom half of the inning, Clint Barmes hits a sacrifice fly that gives the Colorado Rockies their third unearned run of the night, and the deciding run of the game. Huston Street pitches the ninth for the save. Embree becomes the first pitcher to earn a win without throwing a pitch since B. J. Ryan did it for the Baltimore Orioles over the Detroit Tigers on May 1, 2003.
- July 9
  - The Oakland A's announce that they will be retiring Rickey Henderson's number 24 on August 1.
  - David Ortiz of the Boston Red Sox hits his 300th home run off Kansas City Royals pitcher Luke Hochevar.
- July 10
  - At AT&T Park, Jonathan Sánchez of the San Francisco Giants no-hits the San Diego Padres 8–0. Sánchez, starting in place of an injured Randy Johnson, retires the first 22 batters before a Juan Uribe error on Chase Headley's ground ball spoils his bid for a perfect game; this is the only baserunner Sánchez allows. The no-hitter is the first by a Giant since John Montefusco in 1976. The home plate umpire is Brian Runge, whose grandfather Ed was the home plate umpire for Dave Morehead's no-hitter in 1965. In addition, Bengie Molina, who was set to call the game, had to leave just minutes before the game because his wife was going into labor, and was replaced by Eli Whiteside.
  - Division rivals New York Mets and Atlanta Braves swap right fielders who have fallen out of favor with their respective franchises as the Mets acquire Jeff Francoeur from the Braves in exchange for Ryan Church.
- July 11 – Alex Rodriguez of the New York Yankees hits his 570th career home run off Los Angeles Angels pitcher Jason Bulger, passing Rafael Palmeiro for 10th on the all-time list.
- July 13
  - After months of speculation, the Washington Nationals fire manager Manny Acta, and name Jim Riggleman as interim skipper.
  - Milwaukee Brewers All-Star first baseman Prince Fielder out-homers Texas Rangers outfielder Nelson Cruz in the final round by a score of 6–5 to win the State Farm Home run derby at Busch Stadium.
- July 14 – The American League wins their seventh consecutive All-Star game over the National League, 4–3, at Busch Stadium in St. Louis. Carl Crawford, whose leaping catch in the seventh inning robs Brad Hawpe of a home run, is named the game's MVP. Mariano Rivera sets an All-Star record by saving his fourth All-Star game.
- July 15 – Pedro Martínez signs a one-year deal with the Philadelphia Phillies.
- July 16 – Ryan Howard hits his 200th career home run against Chris Volstad of the Florida Marlins. It comes in his 658th career game, 48 fewer than the previous record held by Ralph Kiner (706).
- July 17 – Cody Adams, the Milwaukee Brewers' second-round pick in the 2008 Major League Baseball draft, currently assigned to the Brewers' Midwest League affiliate Wisconsin Timber Rattlers, receives a fifty-game ban after testing positive for an amphetamine. Five other Minor Leaguers from the Dominican Summer League, all pitchers, are also suspended fifty games for performance-enhancing drugs. Billis Andújar and José Encarnación of the Detroit Tigers' Dominican Summer League club and Toronto Blue Jays farmhand Jorge Serra all tested positive for stanozolol. Chicago White Sox farmhand Carlos Rosario and Kansas City Royals pitcher Aristedes Santos were suspended after testing positive for boldenone. A day earlier, five other players in the Dominican Summer League, received fifty game suspensions after each tested positive for a performance-enhancing substance in violation of the Minor League Drug Prevention and Treatment Program. They included: Oakland A's pitchers Alexis Juma and Alex Nolasco and Los Angeles Angels pitcher Renedin Mesa for boldenone, and Philadelphia Phillies farmhands Joan Pascual, a pitcher, and Jose Trinidad, an outfielder, for stanozolol. The total number of suspended Minor Leaguers for the 2009 season is 36.
- July 18 – With two outs in the sixth inning at Dodger Stadium, Mark Loretta singles in Casey Blake to give the Los Angeles Dodgers a 4–0 lead over the Houston Astros. Following the play, Astros pitcher Mike Hampton commits an odd error while trying to slam the ball into his glove. The ball gets away, allowing the Dodgers to score a fifth run. The Dodgers go on to win the game 5–2.

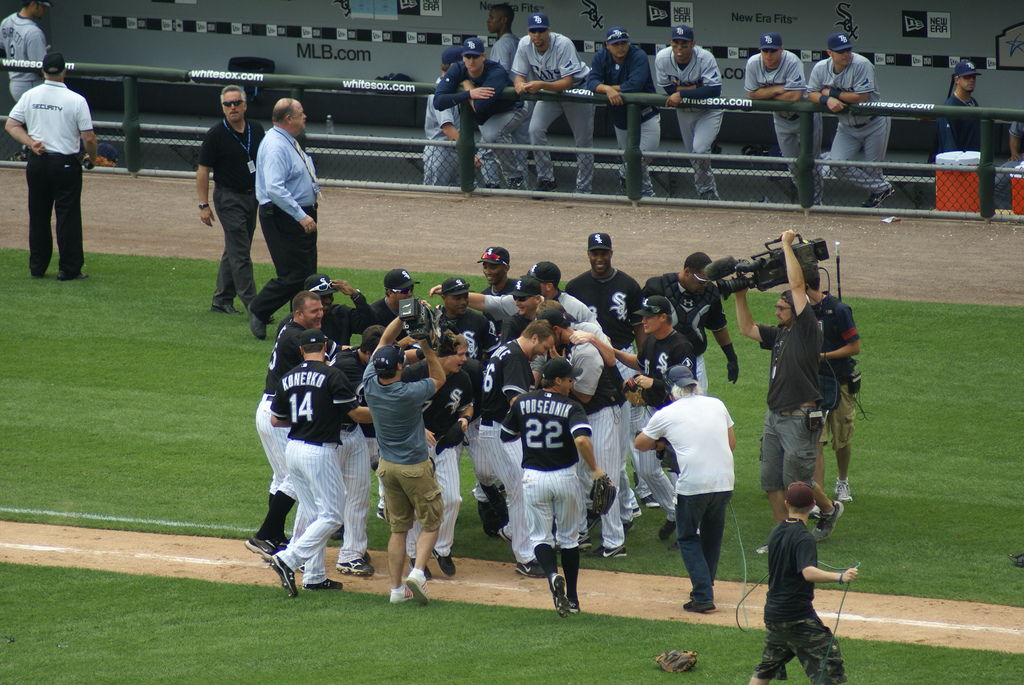
Teammates celebrate Buehrle's perfect game

- July 23 – At U. S. Cellular Field, the Chicago White Sox's Mark Buehrle pitches a 5–0 perfect game against the Tampa Bay Rays. DeWayne Wise, brought into the game in the ninth inning for defensive purposes, makes a spectacular catch to rob Gabe Kapler of what would have been a home run leading off the ninth. The perfect game is Buehrle's second career no-hitter and the second perfect game in White Sox history. Charlie Robertson pitched the first in 1922. Buehrle becomes the sixth pitcher to hurl both a perfect game and another no-hitter (which occurred in 2007), joining Cy Young, Addie Joss, Jim Bunning, Sandy Koufax and Randy Johnson. In the second inning, Josh Fields hits the first grand slam ever hit in a perfect game. Buehrle's 2007 no-hitter also featured a grand slam (Jermaine Dye). In addition, home plate umpire Eric Cooper also called balls and strikes for Buehrle's 2007 no-hitter; both Cooper and Buehrle wear number 56; and both no-hitters were completed in 2 hours, 3 minutes. Following the game, Buehrle receives a congratulatory call from President Obama.
- July 24 – The St. Louis Cardinals acquire Matt Holliday from the Oakland A's for minor leaguers Brett Wallace, Clayton Mortensen and Shane Peterson.
- July 27
  - The Washington Nationals' Josh Willingham hits two grand slams in a game, the 13th player all-time to do so. His first slam is hit off Jeff Suppan and his second one comes off Mark DiFelice en route to a 14–6 Nationals victory over the Milwaukee Brewers.
  - The New York Mets fire Vice President for player development Tony Bernazard. On July 21, the New York Daily News reported that at a recent game at Citi Field, Bernazard unleashed a profanity-laced tirade against a subordinate when the seat he wanted behind home plate was occupied by an Arizona Diamondbacks scout, and the subordinate suggested he wait until the half inning ended to take the seat. A day later, reports surfaced that Bernazard recently pulled off his shirt and challenged middle infield prospect Jose Coronado and the rest of the Mets' Double-A Binghamton Mets to a fight roughly ten days before the All-Star break. A recent 1–6 homestand and rumors of underage drinking by the team were the supposed catalysts of the tirade.
- July 28
  - Two days after his enshrinement into the Baseball Hall of Fame, the Boston Red Sox retire Jim Rice's number 14.
  - Mark Buehrle retires the first seventeen Minnesota Twins he faces. Factoring in the perfect game he pitched in his previous start and the final out he recorded in his July 18 start against the Baltimore Orioles, Buehrle retired 45 straight batters—a major league record. A walk to Alexi Casilla in the sixth inning ends his streak. The following batter, Denard Span, singles for the first hit, and Buehrle records just two more outs and gives up five earned runs as the Twins win 5–3. The previous record of 41 consecutive batters retired had been done twice. Jim Barr did it for the San Francisco Giants in 1972, and Bobby Jenks did it for the Chicago White Sox in 2007. The record-breaking 42nd out is of former teammate Joe Crede.
- July 29 – The Philadelphia Phillies acquire pitcher Cliff Lee and outfielder Ben Francisco from the Cleveland Indians for right-handers Jason Knapp and Carlos Carrasco, shortstop Jason Donald and catcher Lou Marson.
- July 30 – The New York Times reports that Manny Ramirez and David Ortiz were among the 104 Major League Baseball players to test positive for performance-enhancing drugs in 2003, according to lawyers with knowledge of the results.
- July 31
  - A little more than a week after acquiring him, the Boston Red Sox send Adam LaRoche and cash considerations to the Atlanta Braves for Casey Kotchman, then send pitchers Justin Masterson, Nick Hagadone and Bryan Price to the Cleveland Indians for All-Star catcher Victor Martinez. Boston acquired LaRoche from the Pittsburgh Pirates for Minor Leaguers Argenis Diaz and Hunter Strickland on July 22.
  - Following an off-season filled with speculation that Jake Peavy would be traded to the Chicago Cubs, the San Diego Padres strike a 4-for-1 deal with the Cubs' cross-town rivals, the Chicago White Sox, for Peavy. The White Sox send left-handers Aaron Poreda and Clayton Richard and right-handers Dexter Carter and Adam Russell to San Diego for Peavy. The two clubs had struck a deal for Peavy on May 21 that reportedly also included Poreda and Richard, however, Peavy invoked his no-trade clause to block a potential trade.
  - At the trade deadline, the Minnesota Twins acquire shortstop Orlando Cabrera from the Oakland A's for Minor League shortstop Tyler Ladendorf, the Detroit Tigers acquire pitcher Jarrod Washburn from the Seattle Mariners for left-handers Luke French and Mauricio Robles, the Cincinnati Reds received third baseman Scott Rolen and an undisclosed amount of cash from the Toronto Blue Jays for third baseman Edwin Encarnación, reliever Josh Roenicke and Minor League right-handed pitcher Zach Stewart, and the Florida Marlins acquire first baseman Nick Johnson from the Washington Nationals for lefty pitching prospect Aaron Thompson.

=== August ===
- August 1 – Andrew McCutchen hit three home runs and drives in six runs to lead the Pittsburgh Pirates to an 11–6 win over the Washington Nationals at PNC Park. With his feat, McCutchen becomes the first rookie in Pirates history to go deep three times in a game.
- August 2
  - Trailing 2–1 in the ninth inning, the Florida Marlins get a walk-off win on back-to-back shots by Dan Uggla and Cody Ross to defeat the Chicago Cubs 3–2.
  - Melky Cabrera of the New York Yankees hits a triple in the ninth inning to complete the cycle. Cabrera has four RBIs in the game, leading New York to an 8–5 victory over the Chicago White Sox at U.S. Cellular Field. It is the first Yankee cycle since Tony Fernández in 1995.
- August 4
  - Bobby Abreu of the Los Angeles Angels is named the American League Player of the Month for July. The Angels' outfielder batted .380 during the month (27-for-89), driving in 28 runs and scoring a league-best 26 runs. His .467 on-base percentage also paced the AL. Abreu reached base in 25 of his 26 games in July, 13 of which were multi-hit and seven of which were multi-RBI. The monthly award is the second of Abreu's career, but his first in the AL, which he joined on July 30, 2006, when the Yankees acquired him from the Phillies.
  - In the ninth inning of a 17–4 rout of the Milwaukee Brewers, the Los Angeles Dodgers' Guillermo Mota hits Prince Fielder in the leg with a pitch. Mota is immediately ejected by home plate umpire Lance Barksdale. After the game, Fielder charges down the dugout steps, and heads toward the Dodgers clubhouse yelling obscenities through a crowd of fans and reporters. Teammates Casey McGehee and Bill Hall and stadium security officials catch up with Fielder in time to usher him back to the visitor's side. Earlier in the game, the Dodgers' Juan Pierre and Manny Ramírez and the Brewers' Frank Catalanotto had also been hit by pitches.
- August 6
  - Bobby Abreu leads off the fifth inning with a solo home run to left field, giving him 250 homers in his career and moving the Angels right fielder onto an impressive list of baseball achievers. Abreu becomes one of only six players in major league history to collect 250 home runs, 2,000 hits, 1,000 runs, 1,000 runs batted in, 1,000 walks and 300 stolen bases. The others are Barry Bonds, Craig Biggio, and Hall of Famers Joe Morgan, Rickey Henderson and Willie Mays.
  - On consecutive pitches, New York Yankees rookie Mark Melancon fires one heater over Dustin Pedroia's head and to the backstop, and a second into Pedroia's left shoulder during New York's 13–6 victory over the Boston Red Sox. Pedroia was 3–for-4 with a home run, yet Yankees manager Joe Girardi maintains that the eighth-inning plunking was unintentional.
- August 7
  - Rookie Everth Cabrera hits a walk-off grand slam in the ninth inning off closer Francisco Rodríguez to give the San Diego Padres a 6–2 victory over the New York Mets.
  - In different transactions, the Boston Red Sox designate John Smoltz for assignment, the Oakland Athletics give Jason Giambi his unconditional release, and the Minnesota Twins acquire right-hander Carl Pavano from the Cleveland Indians for a player to be named later.
  - Alex Rodriguez hits a walk-off 2-run homer to give the New York Yankees a 2–0 win over the Red Sox in an intense 15-inning game.
- August 10
  - Vladimir Guerrero hits two home runs to lead the Los Angeles Angels to an 8–7 win over the Tampa Bay Rays at Angel Stadium. His solo home run in the seventh inning was his 400th career home run.
  - Troy Tulowitzki hits for the cycle and collects a career-high seven RBIs and five hits in the Colorado Rockies 11–5 victory over the Chicago Cubs. Tulowitski, who also had a grand slam denied in the first video review at Coors Field, joins John Valentin as the only players in MLB history to hit for the cycle and turn an unassisted triple play during their careers.
- August 11 – Junichi Tazawa gives up three runs (one earned) while striking out six in five innings as the Boston Red Sox beat the Detroit Tigers, 7–5, at Fenway Park. Tazawa, at 23 years of age, becomes the youngest Japanese-born pitcher to win his first major league start. Early in the game, Kevin Youkilis is hit by a pitch by Tigers hurler Rick Porcello. Players from benches and bullpens went onto the field and Youkilis tackled Porcello, but no punches are thrown. Youkilis and Porcello are ejected and later suspended five games each.
- August 12 – Pedro Martínez wins his first start with the Philadelphia Phillies, giving up three earned runs over five innings in a 12–5 victory over the Chicago Cubs at Wrigley Field.
- August 14 – Félix Pie of the Baltimore Orioles singles and triples in Baltimore's seven-run seventh inning of their 16–6 win over the Los Angeles Angels, to become the seventh player to hit for the cycle in the season.
- August 16
  - Derek Jeter collects his 2,674th hit in the New York Yankees' 10–3 loss to the Seattle Mariners, to move past Hall of Famer Luis Aparicio as the all-time leader in hits at shortstop.
  - The Los Angeles Angels score nine runs in the 13th inning of their 17–8 victory over the Baltimore Orioles. The Major League record for runs in any extra inning is 12, set by the Texas Rangers against the A's in Oakland on July 3, 1983.
- August 17
  - The Detroit Tigers acquire 1B/DH Aubrey Huff from the Baltimore Orioles in exchange for minor league pitcher Brett Jacobson.
  - Garrett Jones, who homered in Pittsburgh's 9–5 victory over Milwaukee, has, as of this date, hit 13 home runs in only 40 games this season. Jones is the first rookie in eight years to hit 13 (or more) home runs in his first 40 games of a season, joining Albert Pujols and Adam Dunn, who did that in 2001.
- August 18 – The Angels defeated the Indians, 5–4, at Cleveland. Each of the nine players in the Angels' batting order comes out of this game with a season's batting average of .300 or higher. It's the first time since 1934 that any major league team has finished a game-at least 100 games into a season-with each player in its starting batting order hitting .300 or better. The lineups: 2009 Angels Chone Figgins, 3b .308, Bobby Abreu, rf .310, Juan Rivera, lf .310, Vladimir Guerrero, dh .313, Kendrys Morales, 1b .303, Torii Hunter, cf .307, Maicer Izturis, 2b .300, Mike Napoli, c .300, Erick Aybar, ss .313. 1934 Tigers (September 9, 1934, 5–4 win vs. Red Sox) Jo-Jo White, cf .307, Mickey Cochrane, c .328, Charlie Gehringer, 2b .364, Goose Goslin, lf .306, Billy Rogell, ss .303, Hank Greenberg, 1b .337, Marv Owen, 3b .322, Gee Walker, rf .301, Schoolboy Rowe, p .302.
- August 19 – Following a rain delay, Jamie Moyer pitches six scoreless innings in relief of Pedro Martínez, who had taken his spot in the starting rotation, and the Philadelphia Phillies beat the Arizona Diamondbacks 5–1. Chase Utley's 25th home run of the season is the first in a four-homer barrage unleashed by the Phillies, as he becomes the fourth player to reach the 25-homer plateau for Philadelphia this season, joining Ryan Howard, Raúl Ibañez and Jayson Werth. In National League history, only one other team had as many as four players each hit 25 or more home runs as early in a season as this year's Phillies (through their first 117 games). That was the 1995 Colorado Rockies, with Dante Bichette, Vinny Castilla, Andrés Galarraga and Larry Walker all reaching that mark through the team's first 105 games.
- August 20
  - Limited to four hits in a 4–1 loss to the Houston Astros, the Florida Marlins' impressive string of consecutive games with at least 10 hits comes to an end. The streak, which began on August 4 at Washington, reached 15 games, marking the first time since the 1937 St. Louis Browns reach that mark. Florida's streak was the longest by a National League team since the 1929 New York Giants did it. Only three teams since 1900 had streaks longer than 15: the 1925 Cleveland Indians and 1922 St. Louis Browns each reached 18, while the 1900 Philadelphia Phillies finished at 16.
  - Red Sox catcher/first baseman Víctor Martínez hits his 20th home run of the season in an 8–1 victory against the Blue Jays, becoming the fourth American League player to hit 20 homers in a season while playing at least 50 games at both catcher and first base. Martínez joins Gene Tenace (1974–'76), Mickey Tettleton (1993) and Gus Triandos (1956).
- August 21
  - The Yankees beat the Red Sox, 20–11, in the highest-scoring game in the history of their rivalry. The Yankees' 20 runs were the third-most they have ever scored against Boston, behind a 24–4 win in 1923 and a 22–1 victory in 2000.
  - Garrett Jones hits his 14th home run of the season in Pittsburgh's win against Cincinnati. Jones, who played his first game this season on July 1, ties the Pirates rookie record for most home runs hit over consecutive calendar months. That record had been untouched for 51 years, since Dick Stuart hit 14 home runs spanning July and August 1958.
- August 23
  - In the ninth inning of a 9–7 victory over the New York Mets at Citi Field, second baseman Eric Bruntlett of the Philadelphia Phillies turns the 15th, and final, unassisted triple play in Major League history. He catches Jeff Francoeur's line drive for the first out, doubles Luis Castillo off second and tags out Daniel Murphy for the final out. Bruntlett's feat was only the second unassisted triple play to end a game, Johnny Neun having turned the other, on May 31, 1927. It is also only the second unassisted triple play turned by a second baseman in National League play, Mickey Morandini having turned the other, on September 20, 1992.
  - Miguel Cabrera of the Detroit Tigers hits his 200th career home run in a 9–4 defeat to the Oakland Athletics, becoming the fifth Venezuelan player to reach that plateau. Cabrera joins fellow countrymen Tony Armas (251), Bobby Abreu (252), Magglio Ordóñez (275) and Andrés Galarraga (399) on that list. The homer was his team-leading 25th of the season, marking the sixth consecutive season he has reached that total.
  - The Minnesota Twins' Michael Cuddyer hits two home runs in the seventh inning against Kansas City. With his hitting for the cycle on May 22, he is the first player ever to accomplish that feat and a two-homer inning in the same baseball season.
- August 24
  - Cliff Lee allows only two unearned runs in seven innings at Citi Field, improving to 5–0 with a 0.68 ERA since joining the Phillies. Lee and Fernando Valenzuela are the only major-league pitchers in the past 60 years to win each of their first five career starts for a team, with an ERA below 1.00 over those five games. Through five starts in 1981, Valenzuela's ERA was 0.20.
  - Ryan Howard's first-inning home run at Citi Field produces his 600th career RBI. Howard reaches that milestone in his 693rd game, the fastest for any major-league player since 1946, when Ted Williams collected his 600th RBI in his 675th game.
  - Ryan Spilborghs' grand slam in the bottom of the 14th inning gives the Colorado Rockies a 6–4 win over the San Francisco Giants. Since 1900, only one player hit a walk-off grand slam in a later inning: Clyde Vollmer of the Boston Red Sox hit a grand slam in the bottom of the 16th inning to beat the Indians at Fenway Park (July 28, 1951).
- August 25
  - Four days after being claimed on waivers by the Boston Red Sox, Billy Wagner is dealt by the New York Mets to Boston for two players to be named later. Wagner had just returned to the Mets from Tommy John surgery that cut short his 2008 season, and had only made two appearances in 2009.
  - Zack Greinke sets a team record with 15 strikeouts over eight innings in the Kansas City Royals' 6–2 win over the Cleveland Indians.
- August 28 – The Los Angeles Angels acquire left-hander Scott Kazmir from the Tampa Bay Rays for prospects Alexander Torres, Matthew Sweeney and a player to be named later. Second baseman Sean Rodriguez is sent to the Rays on September 1 to complete the deal.

=== September ===
- September 3 – Kendrys Morales of the Anaheim Angels is named the American League Player of the Month for August, after he hit .385 (42-for-109) with 10 home runs, eight doubles, 22 runs, and 33 RBI in 28 games. Morales also set a new club record for RBI in the month, previously held by Bobby Bonds (31, 1977) and was one RBI shy of the franchise record for any month. Last month, Angels' outfielder Bobby Abreu was selected as the A.L. Player of the Month for July. This is the first time any major league club has had consecutive monthly award winners since Texas Rangers' outfielder Josh Hamilton won in both April and May of 2008.
- September 6 – Ichiro Suzuki becomes the second-fastest player in Major League history to reach 2,000 hits with a first-inning double in his 1,402nd game (2001–present). Al Simmons did it in 1,390 games (1924–1934).
- September 7
  - At PNC Park, the Chicago Cubs assure the Pittsburgh Pirates of a record-breaking 17th consecutive losing season, getting two home runs from Derrek Lee and a solid start from pitcher Ted Lilly while winning 4–2. The Pirates will finish below a .500 average, just as they have every season since 1993. The losing string is a major league record and the longest for any team in the four major North American professional team sports.
  - Chris Carpenter of the St. Louis Cardinals tosses a one-hit shutout with 10 strikeouts against the Milwaukee Brewers, 3–0. Carpenter also threw a one-hitter shutout with 10 strikeouts for St. Louis in 2005 (Blue Jays). Since 1900, only two other Cardinals pitchers had a shutout in which they struck out at least 10 batters and did not allow more than one hit: Bob Gibson in 1970 (Padres) and 1971 (Pirates, no-hitter) and Ernie Broglio in 1960 (Cubs).
  - Mark Buehrle and the Chicago White Sox beat the Boston Red Sox 5–1. It is Buehrle's first victory since his perfect game on July 23. Since then, he had been 0–4 with a 5.44 ERA before this win.
- September 8
  - Raúl Ibañez belts two home runs while Jayson Werth, Carlos Ruíz and Chase Utley each add one apiece, to help the Philadelphia Phillies and Pedro Martínez to a 5–3 victory over the Washington Nationals. Ibáñez and Utley both reached their 30th HR of the season, joining Werth (32) and Ryan Howard (38), making the Phillies the 12th team in MLB history with four 30-HR players and only the second with three left-handed batters to reach 30 homers (Howard, Ibáñez and Utley). The first was the 1929 Phillies trio of Lefty O'Doul, Don Hurst and Chuck Klein. The other 11 teams with four 30-HR players in a season are the 1977 Dodgers, 1995 Rockies, 1996 Rockies, 1997 Dodgers, 1997 Rockies, 1998 Braves, 1999 Rockies, 2000 Blue Jays, 2000 Angels, 2004 Chicago Cubs and 2006 White Sox.
  - The Chicago Cubs tie a major league record with eight consecutive hits to start a game in a 9–4 win against the Pittsburgh Pirates. The Cubs also accomplished this feat in 1973 (both against Pittsburgh). Only four other teams had eight straight hits to start a game: 1975 Phillies, 1975 Pirates, 1981 Athletics and 1990 Yankees.

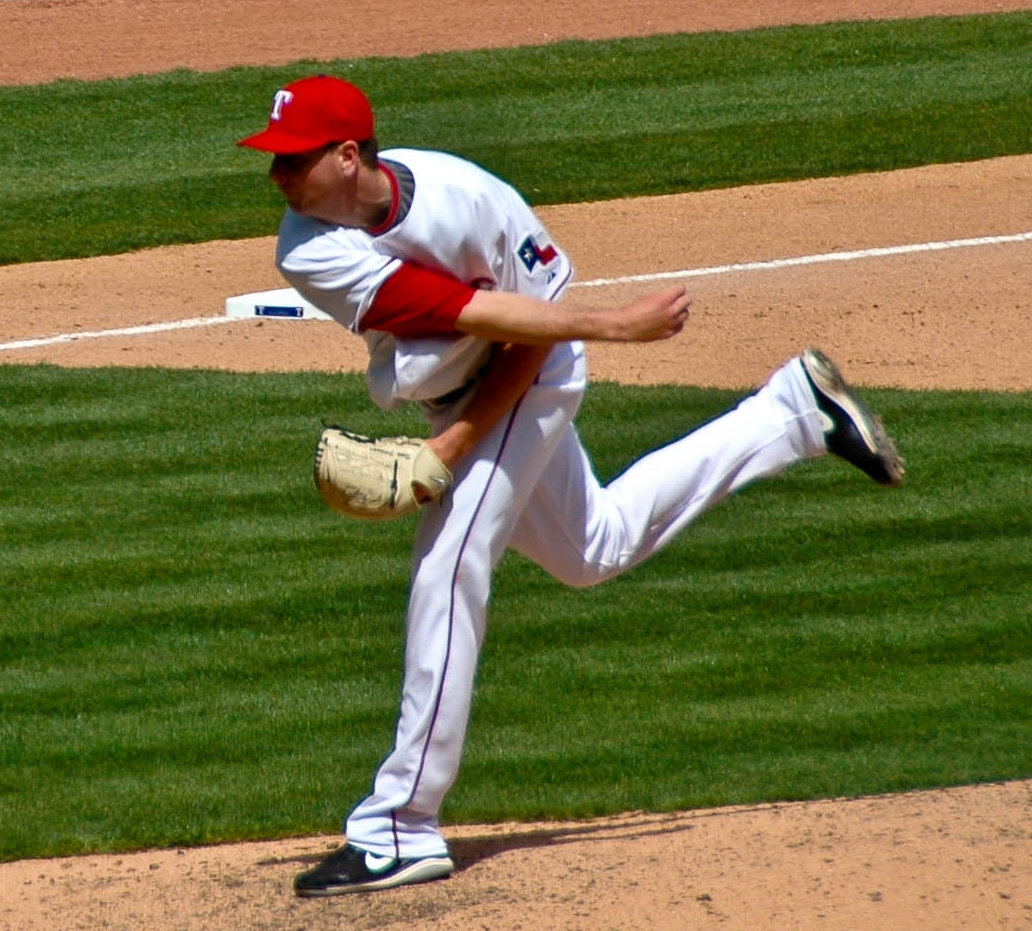
Scott Feldman

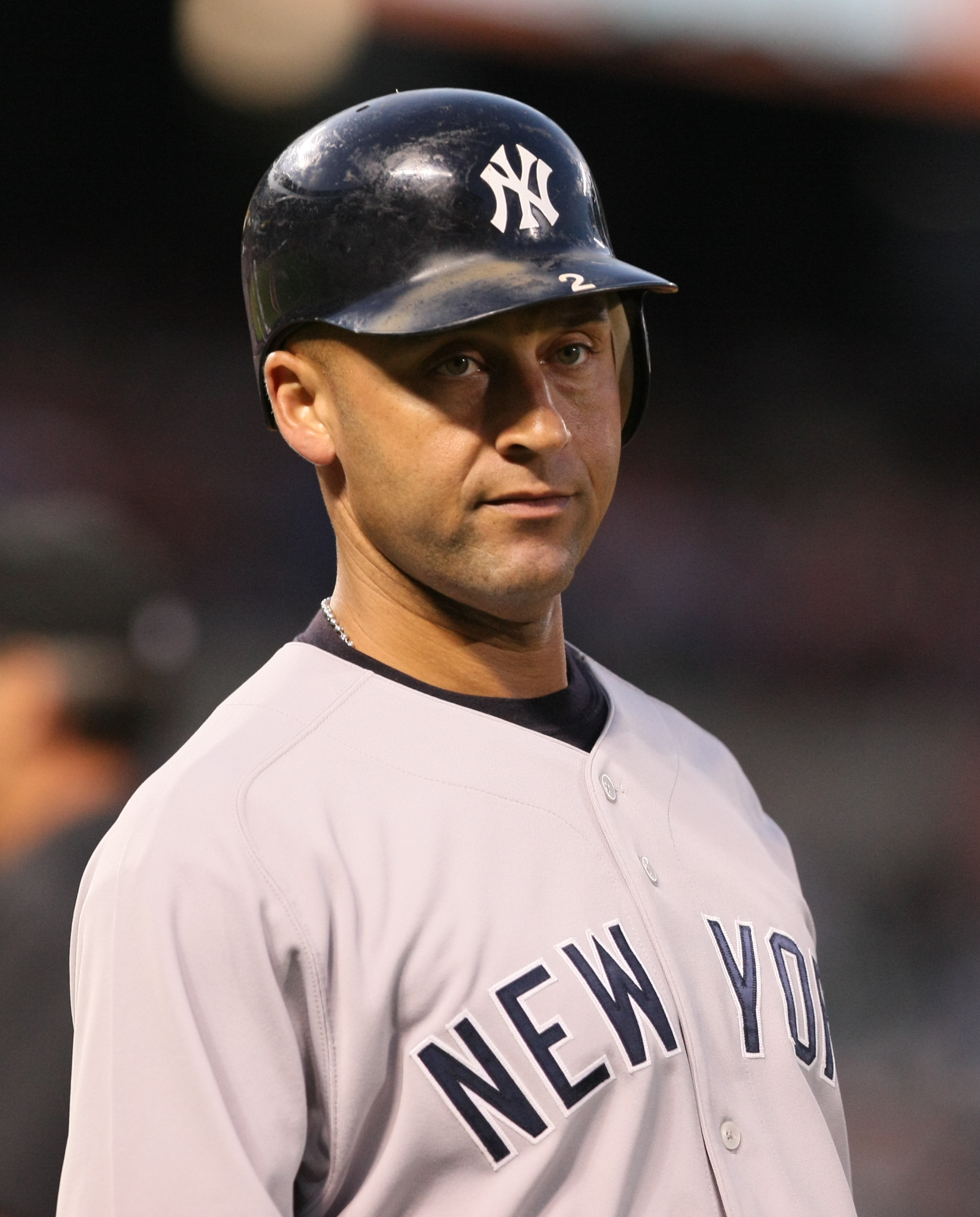
Derek Jeter became the Yankees' all-time hit leader September 11, 2009

- September 9
  - Brian Roberts of the Baltimore Orioles becomes just the fourth player in major league history to have three seasons with at least 50 doubles (2004, 2008–'09). The other players to reach 50 or more doubles at least three times were Hall of Famers Tris Speaker (1912, 1920–'21, 1923), Paul Waner (1928, 1932, 1936) and Stan Musial (1944, 1946, 1953). Roberts also set the all-time record for second basemen with his three 50-double seasons. HoF Billy Herman (1935–'36) and Houston Astros' Craig Biggio (1998–'99) both collected 50-plus doubles in back-to-back seasons but never came close to matching it again.
  - Scott Feldman earns his club-record 12th road win of the season as the Texas Rangers defeated the Cleveland Indians, 10–0, at Progressive Field. Feldman's eight successive road wins is the longest such streak in club history.
  - Derek Jeter collects three hits against the Tampa Bay Rays to give him 2,721 for his Yankee career, tying him with Lou Gehrig atop the Yankees' all-time hits list.
- September 10 – Ian Desmond hits a home run and drives in four runs in his major league debut to lead the Washington Nationals to an 8–7 victory over the Philadelphia Phillies. Desmond is only the second player since 1920 (the first season run batted in was recorded as an official statistic) to drive in at least four runs as a shortstop in his major league debut. The other player to do it was Ted Kazanski for the Phillies against the Cubs on June 25, 1953. Matt Stairs of the Phillies belts the second pinch-hit grand slam of his career in a lost cause.
- September 11 – With a single off Chris Tillman to lead off the third inning, Derek Jeter collects his 2,722nd career hit to pass Lou Gehrig as the all-time Yankees hit leader.
- September 13 – In the second inning of the second game of a doubleheader against the Texas Rangers, Ichiro Suzuki hits a slow grounder to Rangers shortstop Elvis Andrus that he legs out for a single. It is his 200th hit of the season, giving him an MLB record nine consecutive 200 hit seasons.
- September 15
  - In the eighth inning of the Toronto Blue Jays' 10–4 victory over the New York Yankees at Yankee Stadium, a bench-clearing brawl breaks out. Earlier in the game Blue Jays third baseman Edwin Encarnación is hit by a Sergio Mitre pitch, and in the eighth inning second baseman Aaron Hill is hit by Mark Melancon. In what appeared to be retaliation for the shot to Hill, Jays pitcher Jesse Carlson throws a pitch behind Yankees catcher Jorge Posada in the bottom half of the inning. Both benches and bullpens clear; however, no punches are thrown. Posada ends up reaching on a walk, and scores on a Brett Gardner double. As he crosses the plate, he bumps Carlson, who had been backing up home plate on the play. Posada is immediately ejected from the game, and the benches and bullpens empty for a second time as a fight breaks out between the two.
  - Daisuke Matsuzaka of the Boston Red Sox is activated following his near three-month stint on the disabled list, to become the fourth Japanese player on Boston's active roster, setting a Major League record. Matsuzaka joins fellow pitchers Takashi Saito, Hideki Okajima and Junichi Tazawa. On August 7, in a 15-inning loss at Yankee Stadium, the Red Sox had set another record, becoming the first team to deploy three Japanese pitchers in the same game.
- September 16 – Jayson Werth's seventh-inning grand slam is the key hit in Philadelphia's 6–1 win against Washington, the Phillies' major-league leading tenth slam this season, making them only the sixth team in National League history to hit at least 10 slams in one season. Meanwhile, Ian Desmond goes 2-for-4 against the Phillies and is now 10-for-17 (.588) since making his major-league debut, to become the first major league player in more than half a century to collect 10 hits over his first four career games. The last player to do that was Jim Davenport for the 1958 Giants, in the team's first season in San Francisco.
- September 18 – With two outs in the ninth inning, and Mariano Rivera on the mound for the Yankees, Mike Sweeney hits a double, followed by a first-pitch home run by Ichiro Suzuki to give the Mariners a 3–2 victory. It is the first walk-off home run of Ichiro's career.
- September 20 – Chicago Cubs general manager Jim Hendry suspends outfielder Milton Bradley for the final two weeks of the 2009 season following comments he made in which he said the Cubs were "not a positive environment." Hendry explained the decision with the following:

There have been a lot of issues that we've lived with during the year, but the last few days became too much for me to tolerate, to be honest with you. I'm not going to let our great fans become an excuse, I'm not going to tolerate not answering questions from the media respectfully. Whether you feel like talking or not, it's part of our jobs. I'm not going to allow disrespect to other people in that locker room and uniformed personnel. The only real negativity here is his own production.

Three days later, Bradley would issue an apology.

- September 21 – Cecil Cooper is fired as manager of the Houston Astros. Third-base coach Dave Clark is named interim manager for the thirteen games remaining in their season.
- September 22
  - Dan Uggla of the Florida Marlins hits his 30th home run of the season in the second game of a doubleheader against the Philadelphia Phillies, giving Uggla three consecutive seasons of 30-or-more homers. He is the first player in major league history to do so while playing at least 100 games at second base. Ryne Sandberg (1989–1990), Alfonso Soriano (2002–2003) and Chase Utley (2008-2009) are the only other second basemen with 30-HRs in 100 games during two straight seasons.
  - Mark Reynolds of the Arizona Diamondbacks strikes out three times for a total of 206 on the season, breaking the single-season record of 204 that he set in 2008.
- September 23 – The Atlanta Braves announce that manager Bobby Cox will retire from his managerial position at the conclusion of the 2010 season and immediately enter into a five-year contract that will enable him to continue serving as a consultant with the organization.
- September 24 - Sporting News publishes a series of All-Decade awards, including the All-Decade Team. Cardinals first baseman Albert Pujols is named the MLB Athlete of the Decade, ex-Yankees manager Joe Torre, now managing the Dodgers, is named Manager of the Decade, and the Red Sox are named the Team of the Decade.

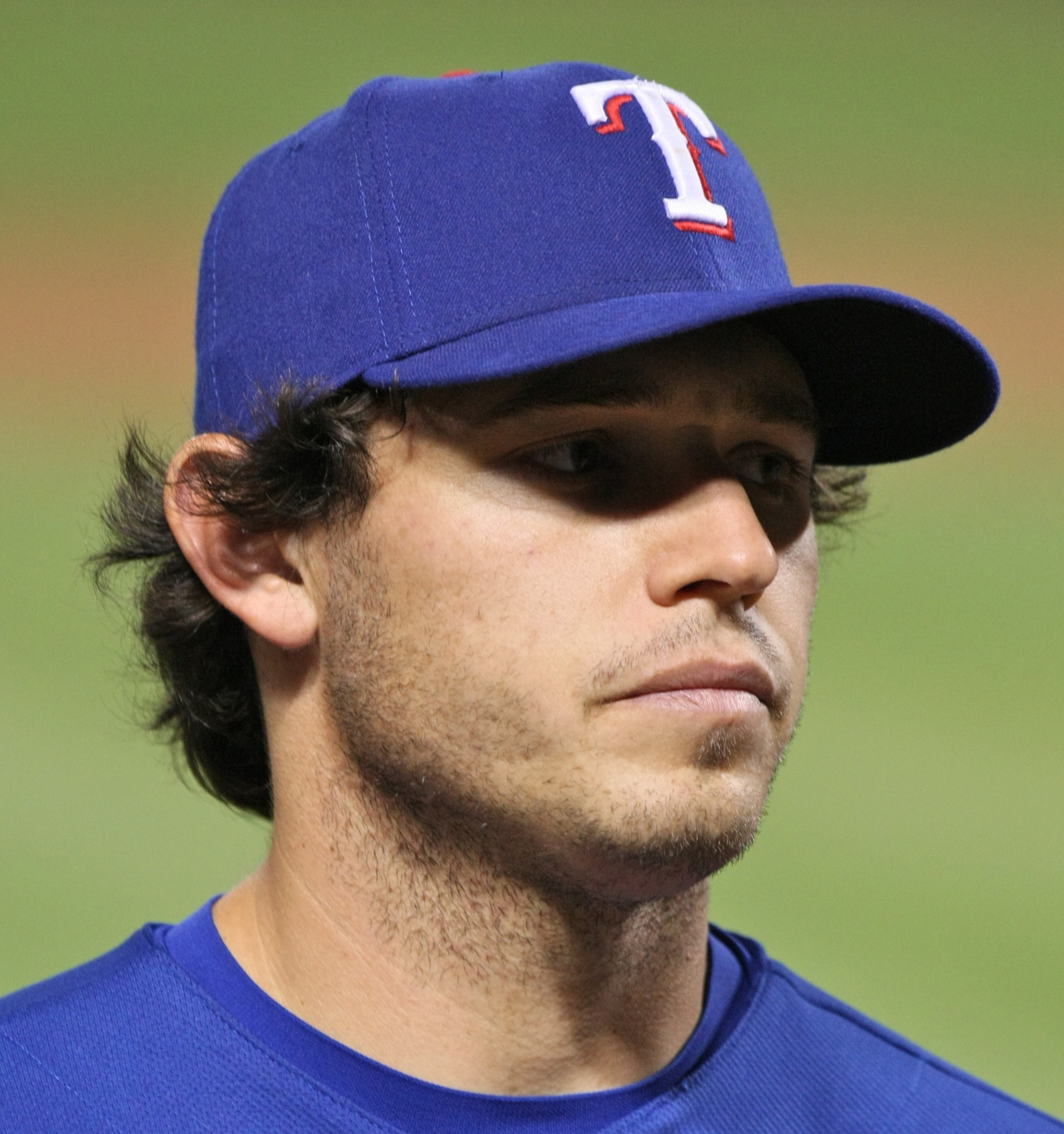
Ian Kinsler

- September 25 – Ian Kinsler's three-run home run in the Texas Rangers' 8–3 victory over the visiting Tampa Bay Rays is his 30th home run of the season. Combined with his 30th stolen base a day before, he becomes only the second player in Rangers' history to put up a 30-HR 30-SB season, joining Alfonso Soriano, who did it in 2005. Kinsler also joins Soriano, who also had 30–30 seasons for the Yankees (2002–2003), and Brandon Phillips of the Reds (2007) as the only 30/30 second basemen in Major League history.
- September 26
  - Ichiro Suzuki is ejected for the first time in his professional career, ending a streak that Suzuki started in 1992 as a rookie with the Japan's Orix BlueWave. It happens in the top of the fifth inning of the Mariners' eventual extra-inning 5–4 loss to the Blue Jays at Rogers Centre, and is also the first ejection of a Mariners player, coach or manager this season.
  - Marlon Byrd of the Texas Rangers hits his sixth career grand slam in the 15–3 victory against the visiting Tampa Bay Rays. Byrd, who homered twice in the game, now has 59 lifetime home runs, becoming the only player in major-league history with fewer than 60 home runs and six-or-more grand slams.
  - The St. Louis Cardinals clinch the National League Central Division title with a 6–3 victory over the Colorado Rockies. It is the eighth division title for the Cardinals manager Tony La Russa in his 14-year tenure in St. Louis.
  - Víctor Martínez of the Boston Red Sox singles with two outs in the ninth off Mariano Rivera, extending his hitting streak to 25 games, in a 3–0 defeat against New York at Yankee Stadium. Martinez's streak is the longest by a Venezuelan-born player, surpassing the 59-year, 24-game streak set by Chico Carrasquel in 1950. Martínez's streak ends the following day, but he bats 34-for-95 (.358) during the streak.
  - Team Canada earns its first bronze medal in the 2009 Baseball World Cup by upending Puerto Rico, 6–2, in Grosseto, Italy. The third-place finish is the senior national team's highest placing since earning a bronze medal at the 1999 Pan American Games in Winnipeg, Manitoba, Canada. The medal also adds to Baseball Canada's total which is now 11 with two bronze and a silver for the women's national team and five bronze and one gold (1991 world junior) for the national junior team.
- September 27
  - The New York Yankees secure their 16th AL division crown since 1969 (11th since 1995) with a 4–2 win over their arch-rivals, the Boston Red Sox. The Yankees put a bow on this title with their major-league leading 100th win, as second baseman Robinson Canó collected his 200th hit of the season. Canó's infield partner, shortstop Derek Jeter, already has 200 hits in the season, becoming the first second baseman/shortstop combo to accomplish the feat in major league history.
  - Team USA takes advantage of a critical error by Cuba, scoring six runs with two outs in the seventh inning on its way to a 10–5 win in the gold medal game of the 2009 Baseball World Cup in Nettuno, Italy. Paired with its win over Cuba in the 2007 tournament, the Americans have won back-to-back World Cup titles for the first time since 1973 and 1974. Justin Smoak, Terry Tiffee and Jon Weber are named to the IBAF World Cup All-Tournament Team. Smoak is also named the Baseball World Cup's Most Valuable Player.
  - In the eighth inning of the Cardinals' 4–3 loss to the Rockies in Coors Field, Albert Pujols records his 181st assist of the season, setting a National League record for most assists in a season by a first baseman. The previous record had been set by the Cubs' Mark Grace in 1990. Bill Buckner holds the Major League record of 184, set in 1985 with the Red Sox.
- September 28
  - The Los Angeles Angels defeat the Texas Rangers convincingly, 11–0, to take the American League West title. Los Angeles is headed back to the playoffs for the sixth time in eight years.
  - Carlos Lee of the Houston Astros drives in his 100th run of the season, giving him a five-year streak of reaching triple-digits in RBIs. Only four other players have driven in at least 100 runs in each of the last five seasons: Bobby Abreu, Miguel Cabrera, Albert Pujols and Mark Teixeira.
  - Robinson Canó hits his 25th home run of the season, and he now has 201 hits as a second baseman this year. Since Rogers Hornsby retired in 1937, only two other players have had 200 hits and 25 homers as a second baseman in one season: Bret Boone in 2001 and Alfonso Soriano in 2002. Over the last 70 years only three other Yankees players have had a 200-hit, 25-HR season: Don Mattingly (1985–1986), Bernie Williams (1999) and Soriano (2002).
- September 29
  - The Baltimore Orioles' Brian Roberts hits his 56th double this season against Tampa Bay's Wade Davis, breaking the record for a switch-hitter set by Lance Berkman in 2001. Earlier in the season, Roberts became just the fourth player all-time to record three 50-double seasons, the other three being Stan Musial, Tris Speaker and Paul Waner.
  - After being down 8–2 to the Toronto Blue Jays, the Boston Red Sox score five in the eighth to bring it within one run. Although their comeback attempt falls short, a 5–2 loss by the Texas Rangers to the Los Angeles Angels secures the Wild Card for the BoSox. Adam Lind has a memorable game, hitting three home runs for the Blue Jays.
- September 30
  - Cleveland Indians General Manager Mark Shapiro announces that Eric Wedge and his coaches have all been relieved of their duties. However, Wedge and his staff will stay aboard for the season's final six games.
  - The Philadelphia Phillies clinch their third straight NL East title, 10–3 at home against the Houston Astros.
  - Ricky Nolasco of the Florida Marlins sets a club record with 16 strikeouts and came within one of a Major League mark by fanning nine straight in a 5–4 victory over the Atlanta Braves. The big league record for consecutive strikeouts in a game is 10 by Tom Seaver for the New York Mets on April 22, 1970. Two other pitchers had nine consecutive strikeouts in one game: Mickey Welch for the New York Giants in 1884 and Jake Peavy for the San Diego Padres in 2007.
  - Pirates catcher Ryan Doumit goes 4-for-4 with a home run and four RBIs in the second game of a double-header against the Cubs. Doumit is only the second Pittsburgh catcher in the last 40 years to have at least four hits and four RBIs in the same game. Jason Kendall collected four hits and five RBIs in a 13–1 Pirates victory over the Cardinals on May 19, 2000.
  - Justin Maxwell of the Washington Nationals becomes the second player (and the second rookie) to hit a walk-off grand slam against New York Mets closer Francisco Rodríguez this season. Everth Cabrera of the San Diego Padres did that on August 7. The only other pitchers in major-league history to surrender two game-ending grand slams in one season were Satchel Paige (1952), Lindy McDaniel (1963) and Lee Smith (1995).
  - Justin Masterson goes the distance for the Cleveland Indians and struck out 12 but the Chicago White Sox scratch out a run in the top of the sixth inning to win 1–0. Masterson is the first major-leaguer to lose a complete game by a 1–0 score while pitching at least nine innings and striking out a dozen or more batters since May 6, 2000, when Pedro Martínez of the Red Sox struck out 17 but was beaten by Tampa Bay at Fenway Park.

=== October ===
- October 1:
  - Ichiro Suzuki of the Seattle Mariners collects his 220 hit of season to set a new Major League mark. It is the fifth time in nine seasons in the majors that Suzuki has reached 220 hits, supplanting the old record of four 220-hit seasons shared by Hall of Famers Jesse Burkett and Rogers Hornsby. Earlier this season, Suzuki surpassed another Hall of Famer when he collected his ninth consecutive 200-hit season (September 13), breaking the long-standing major-league record of eight straight 200-hit seasons set by Wee Willie Keeler from 1894 to 1901.
  - Orlando Cabrera hits his first career grand slam to lead the Twins to an 8–3 win over Detroit. Cabrera, who had never hit a home run in 135 previous at-bats with the bases loaded, was the only active major leaguer who has had at least 100 bases-loaded at-bats without a grand slam to his credit.
  - Tony La Russa passes John McGraw for second-most games managed in baseball with his 4,770th game managed (2,552–2,214–4). La Russa gets three more games (October 4) to extend his managed games to 4,773 (2,552–2,217–4) by the end of the 2009 season.
- October 2:
  - B. J. Upton not only hits for the cycle in the Rays' 13–4 victory over the Yankees, but he does it by the end of the fifth inning. It is the quickest cycle since Mike Lansing of the Rockies accumulated all four hits within the first four innings against the Diamondbacks on June 18, 2000. The Rays score nine runs in the first three innings to deny CC Sabathia his first 20-win season. Sabathia is the first pitcher in nearly 30 years to allow as many as nine runs in a game while needing one more victory for the first 20-win season of his career. The last pitcher to do so was Rick Langford of the Athletics in 1980.
  - Adam Wainwright of the Cardinals also fails to earn his 20th victory when the Brewers rally for six runs in the seventh inning of their eventual 12–6 win. 2009 will be only the second season in major-league history without a 20-game winner (see 2006), excluding seasons that were shortened by work stoppages.
- October 3:
  - In the early morning hours, following an 0–4 performance in an 8–0 loss to the Chicago White Sox the previous night, Miguel Cabrera is picked up by Birmingham, Michigan police after a 911 call from his wife, Rosangel. The couple began fighting when Miguel came home intoxicated talking on the phone, and woke up their child. When police arrive at his suburban Detroit home at 5:00 AM, Cabrera blows a 0.26 on the breathalyzer administered on the scene, which is three times Michigan's legal limit for driving. Tigers GM Dave Dombrowski picks him up at the station at roughly 7:30 AM. That evening, Cabrera goes 0–4 and strands six runners in the Tigers' 5–1 loss to the ChiSox.
  - The San Diego Padres announce that executive vice president/general manager Kevin Towers will not return for the 2010 season. In a similar movement, the Toronto Blue Jays dismissed general manager J. P. Ricciardi after eight seasons.
  - Ryan Howard is in select company after hitting his 45th home run of the season in Philadelphia's loss to Florida. The 29-year-old Howard is only the second player to do that before his 30th birthday, the other being Harmon Killebrew (1961 to 1964, at 28). Beside this, as Howard nears the end of his fifth full season he has a career total of 640 runs batted in, moving past for the third-highest RBI total after five seasons in Major League history over Lou Gehrig (639, 1926–'30) and Ted Williams (638, 1939–'42, 1946). The leader and runner-up are Joe DiMaggio (691, 1936–'40) and Hal Trosky (663, 1934–'38).
- October 4:
  - Alex Rodriguez belts a three-run homer and a grand slam in New York's 10-run 6th inning, leading the Yankees to a 10–2 victory over the Rays in the regular-season finale. Rodriguez' 30th home run of the season makes him the first AL player to have 7 RBIs in a single inning. The only other Major Leaguers to have 7 or more RBIs in an inning are Fernando Tatís, who hit two grand slams as a member of the Cardinals to collect 8 RBIs against the Dodgers in the third inning on April 23, 1999, and Ed Cartwright, who hit a 3-run homer and a grand slam in the 3rd inning on September 23, 1890, for 7 RBIs. Rodriguez also reached the 30 HR/100 RBI plateau for the 12th consecutive season.
  - Albert Pujols breaks Bill Buckner's 1985 major-league record for assists by a first baseman, with his 185th.
  - The Detroit Tigers and Minnesota Twins each win their final (162nd) games, leading to a one-game tiebreaker at the Metrodome to decide the American League Central champion. It is the third consecutive season – the longest such streak in MLB history – that the regular season goes beyond 162 games, requiring a division tiebreaker to finalize the postseason field. The Twins become the first club ever to play such a tiebreaker in consecutive years, having lost the AL Central tiebreaker against the Chicago White Sox in 2008. The Colorado Rockies beat the San Diego Padres for the 2007 National League Wild Card to start this three-year extension.
  - Mark Reynolds of the Arizona Diamondbacks strikes out three times, setting a new season record of 223 strikeouts in a season.
- October 5 – The Milwaukee Brewers and Trevor Hoffman agree to a one-year deal with a mutual option for 2011.
- October 6:
  - Kansas City Royals first baseman Billy Butler is named winner of the AL Player of the Month Award for September. Butler batted .363 in the month with 10 doubles, six home runs and 26 RBI. He also recorded his fourth 3-double game of the season on September 9 against the Detroit Tigers to set a Major League record and had a pair of 2-homer games against the Los Angeles Angels (September 7) and Minnesota Twins (September 25). His 26 RBIs in the month led the AL and were tied for second in baseball. Butler and Zack Greinke (April) are the first Royals duo to win the award in the same season since 2000, when Jermaine Dye and Johnny Damon took home the honor.
  - Chicago Cubs first baseman Derrek Lee is named winner of the NL Player of the Month Award for September, after he led the Majors with a .386 average (32-for-83) with nine home runs, 23 RBIs, a .795 slugging percentage and .500 on-base percentage.
  - The final regular season game in the Metrodome may have been the best. The one-game division playoff between the Minnesota Twins and Detroit Tigers goes extra innings, 4–4. Both teams score a run in the tenth before an Alexi Casilla single in the twelfth inning scores Carlos Gómez from second to give the Twins the 6–5 victory. They become the first team in Major League history to win the division after trailing by three games with four to play. They are also the first team in MLB history to make the playoffs in the final year of their stadium.

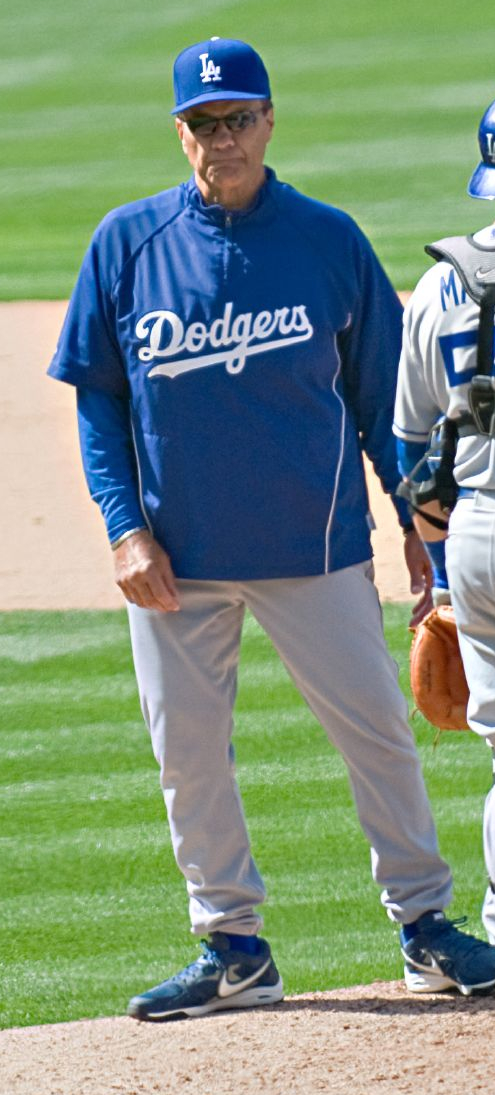
2009 is Joe Torre's record tying 14th consecutive post season

- October 7:
  - The Philadelphia Phillies open defense of their World Series title with a convincing victory over the Colorado Rockies, 5–1, in Game 1 of the NLDS behind a dominant Cliff Lee in his postseason debut. Lee hurls a complete game and gets support from Raúl Ibañez, Jayson Werth and Ryan Howard RBI extra-base hits. Rockies starter Ubaldo Jiménez matches Lee with four scoreless innings before surrendering two runs in the fifth inning and three in the sixth.
  - The New York Yankees win their first playoff game at new Yankee Stadium, as CC Sabathia holds down the Minnesota Twins, 7–2, in Game 1 of the ALDS. Derek Jeter and Hideki Matsui homer, and Alex Rodriguez contribute with two RBIs. Minnesota scores first, but rookie left-hander Brian Duensing gives it all back and the Twins cannot recover.
  - The Los Angeles Dodgers defeat Chris Carpenter and the St. Louis Cardinals, 5–3, in Game 1 of the NLDS. After St. Louis scores a run off Randy Wolf in the first inning, Matt Kemp blasts a two-run homer in the bottom half of the frame, and Los Angeles does not trail again. Carpenter allows four runs in an uneven five-inning performance. Rafael Furcal goes 3-for-4, as the Dodgers' bullpen gives up a run in 5 1/3 superb innings. The Dodgers (16) and Cardinals (14) combine to strand 30 runners on base, setting a record for a nine-inning postseason game.
- October 8:
  - The Colorado Rockies even the NLDS against the Philadelphia Phillies, winning the second game, 5–4, at Citizens Bank Park. Aaron Cook combines with five relievers for the victory, while the attack is led by Yorvit Torrealba (2-for-3, two-run homer) and Carlos González (3-for-5, run). Cole Hamels is the losing pitcher.
  - The Los Angeles Dodgers take advantage of a crucial error by Matt Holliday with two outs, bases empty in the bottom of the ninth inning, to defeat the St. Louis Cardinals 3–2. Ronnie Belliard and Mark Loretta come through with RBI singles off closer Ryan Franklin, giving the Dodgers a 2–0 lead in the NLDS. St. Louis starter Adam Wainwright, who lasts eight innings, allows one run on three hits and strikes out seven in a lost cause.
  - The Los Angeles Angels defeat the Boston Red Sox in the ALDS opener, 5–0, behind a strong start by John Lackey, who allows four hits in 7 1/3 innings of work. Torii Hunter gets the game-breaking hit, a three-run homer off Jon Lester in the bottom of the fifth inning that breaks a scoreless tie, and reliever Darren Oliver pitches 1 2/3 innings of no-hit ball.
- October 9:
  - The New York Yankees storm past the Minnesota Twins in Game 2 of their division series, tying it in the ninth inning on a two-run homer by Alex Rodriguez and winning in the 11th, 4–3, on a blast down the left-field line by Mark Teixeira.
  - The Los Angeles Angels manufacture a three-run seventh inning to move one win away from the ALCS and leave the Boston Red Sox on the precipice. Jered Weaver pitches brilliantly in his second career postseason start, outduelling Josh Beckett in the 4–1 triumph.
- October 10 – The Los Angeles Dodgers dispose of the host St. Louis Cardinals in Game 3 of the NLDS, 5–1, advancing to the league championship. For Joe Torre, it is his sixth postseason series sweep as a Major League manager. Torre had four sweeps with the Yankees (1998 ALDS vs. Texas and World Series vs. San Diego, and 1999 ALDS vs. Texas and World Series vs. Atlanta) and one previous sweep with the Dodgers (2008 NLDS vs. Cubs). The only other manager in Major League history to lead his teams to at least six postseason series sweeps is the manager Torre defeated in this year's NLDS, Tony La Russa, who has seven sweeps on his resume.
- October 11:
  - The Los Angeles Angels comes up with a three-run comeback in the ninth inning off Jonathan Papelbon, to clinch the ALDS with a 7–6 victory against the Boston Red Sox at Fenway Park. Vladimir Guerrero brings home the tying and winning runs with a single and the Angels sweep aside the Red Sox in stunning fashion.
  - The New York Yankees defeat the Minnesota Twins, 4–1, to complete a three-game sweep of their ALDS and record their first victory in a postseason series since 2004, thanks to Andy Pettitte, who pitches a gem, and home runs from Alex Rodriguez and Jorge Posada. It is the final baseball game inside the Hubert H. Humphrey Metrodome, which will be replaced next season by Minneapolis' Target Field.
- October 12 – The Philadelphia Phillies are headed back to the NLCS after eliminating the Colorado Rockies from the playoffs with a three-run, ninth-inning rally, in Game 4 of the NLDS. The defending World Series Champions blow a one-run lead in the bottom of the eighth inning before pulling out a 5–4 victory at Coors Field. The Phillies-Rockies series is the only one in the first round not to end in a three-game sweep. The 13 combined games during the opening round equal the fewest (in 2007) since the three-round postseason format was introduced in 1995.
- October 14 – For the third time of his career, New York Yankees closer Mariano Rivera earns the Delivery Man of the Year Award, sponsored by DHL. Rivera went 3–3 with a 1.76 ERA in 66 1/3 innings of work and converted 44 of his 46 save opportunities (95.7%), permitting 48 hits and 12 walks with 72 strikeouts while holding opposing hitters to a .197 batting average.
- October 15 – Carlos Ruiz and Raúl Ibañez hit three-run homers, Cole Hamels wins his fourth Game 1 of the postseason, and closer Brad Lidge finishes off the Philadelphia Phillies' 8–6 victory over the Los Angeles Dodgers in the NLCS opener at Dodger Stadium.
- October 16:
  - The Los Angeles Dodgers defeat the Philadelphia Phillies, 2–1, in Game 2 of the NLCS. Ryan Howard hits a solo homer in the fourth inning to put the Phillies ahead, but an eighth-inning bullpen collapse combined with a crucial error by Chase Utley and a bases-loaded, walk-RBI to Andre Ethier makes the difference. Phillies' Pedro Martínez and Dodgers' Vicente Padilla find themselves in a pitching duel during seven-plus innings, but they are not a factor in the decision. Hong-Chih Kuo is the winning pitcher and Chan Ho Park the loser, while Jonathan Broxton earns the save. The series is tied 1–1.
  - CC Sabathia holds the Los Angeles Angels to four hits and a run in eight strong innings, in a 4–1 victory that gives the New York Yankees a 1–0 lead in the ALCS. Hideki Matsui (2), Alex Rodriguez and Derek Jeter each drive in runs, and Mariano Rivera gets the save. Three Angels errors tie a franchise postseason record and lead to two Yankees runs, which serve as a support for Sabathia, who does not need all that much help to prevail in his duel against John Lackey.
- October 17 – Alex Rodriguez hit a tying home run in the bottom of the 11th inning to negate a Chone Figgins go-ahead RBI-single, and the New York Yankees score the winning run on a 13th inning error by Maicer Izturis to edge the Los Angeles Angels, 4–3, for a 2–0 lead in the best-of-seven ALCS.
- October 18 – Ryan Howard plays a key role in a four-run first inning and Cliff Lee dominates the Los Angeles Dodgers over eight innings, giving the Philadelphia Phillies an 11–0 win and a 2–1 NLCS lead. With his first-inning two-run triple off Hiroki Kuroda, Howard becomes the first player in Major League history to record an RBI in seven consecutive playoff games in the same year. Lee allows just three hits and struck out 10 in eight scoreless innings to improve to 2–0 with a 0.74 ERA in three starts this postseason. Howard is one game shy of matching the legendary Lou Gehrig, who holds the all-time record with an RBI in eight consecutive postseason games that spanned from 1928 through 1932.
- October 19:
  - For the second straight game, the Los Angeles Angels and New York Yankees play into tense extra innings, until Jeff Mathis drives home Howie Kendrick in the 11th inning, and the Angels survive a second straight ALCS thriller, beating New York 5–4 to trim the Yankees' series lead to 2–1. Ervin Santana earns the win, while Kendrick homers and triples before singling with two outs in the 11th off Alfredo Aceves, who takes the loss.
  - Jimmy Rollins lines a two-run double with two outs in the ninth inning off Jonathan Broxton and the Philadelphia Phillies rally past the Los Angeles Dodgers, 5–4, for a 3–1 lead in the NLCS. Brad Lidge gets two outs in the ninth to earn the win, while Ryan Howard hits a two-run home run to extend his Major League record to eight consecutive playoff games with an RBI within the same year.
  - Three Phillies members make history during their 5–4 victory against the Dodgers in Game 4 of the NLCS. There have been 1,251 postseason games in MLB history, according to the Elias Sports Bureau. Only three players ever ended a game with a walk-off extra-base hit by a team that was one out away from losing: (1) Jimmy Rollins with his two-run double in the ninth inning off Jonathan Broxton in this game, (2) the Dodgers' Kirk Gibson with his memorable home run off Oakland Athletics' closer Dennis Eckersley in Game 1 of the 1988 World Series, and (3) the Brooklyn Dodgers' Cookie Lavagetto with his two-run double off Bill Bevens in Game 4 (and final game) of the 1947 World Series, when Yankees pitcher Bevens got within one out of the first no-hitter game in World Series history, and then lost it all. Also, Ryan Howard joins Lou Gehrig as the only players who have recorded an RBI in eight consecutive playoff games, a mark that Gehrig set 77 years ago, and also matches Mike Schmidt's career-club, playoff-record with his sixth career postseason home run. In addition to Rollins and Howard, Chase Utley surpasses the legendary Gehrig when he reaches base safely in his 24th consecutive postseason game. Former Orioles first baseman Boog Powell holds the Major League record by reaching safely in 25 consecutive postseason games that spanned from 1966 to 1971.
- October 20:
  - Alex Rodriguez homers in his third straight game and CC Sabathia pitches five-hit ball on three days' rest, as the New York Yankees take a 10–1 victory over the Los Angeles Angels in Game 4 of the ALCS, moving just one win away from going to their 40th World Series. Rodriguez drives in a run for the eighth consecutive postseason game, tying a record that had been set by Lou Gehrig 77 years ago and tied by Ryan Howard less than 24 hours earlier.
  - Kenji Johjima opts out of the final two seasons with the Seattle Mariners, allowing him to sign with a Japanese team. Johjima's contract gave him the right to end it by November 15 for the purpose of finishing his career in Japan. He gives up salaries of $7.7 million in 2010 and $8.1 million in 2011. Johjima hit .268 in his four seasons with Seattle, with 48 homers and 198 RBIs in 462 games. He holds the AL record for hits by a rookie catcher with 147 in 2006. His 18 homers in this season tied the Mariners' record for most by a catcher.
- October 21 – Jayson Werth homers twice, Shane Victorino and Pedro Feliz also connect, and the Philadelphia Phillies beat the Los Angeles Dodgers, 10–4, in Game 5 of the NLCS to win their second straight NL pennant. Ryan Howard is named Series MVP. Chase Utley ties a record set by Boog Powell when he reaches base safely in his 25th consecutive postseason game. The Dodgers lose in the NLCS to the Phillies for the second straight season.
- October 22 – Kendrys Morales drives in the go-ahead run with a two-out single in the seventh inning, and the Los Angeles Angels respond to the New York Yankees' six-run comeback moments earlier for a 7–6 win that trims the Yankees' ALCS lead to 3–2.
- October 25 – The New York Yankees win their 40th American League pennant (and the first in six years) beating the Los Angeles Angels, 5–2, in Game 6 of the ALCS. Andy Pettitte earns his 16th postseason victory, breaking a tie with John Smoltz for most wins in the postseason. CC Sabathia is selected MVP of the series.
- October 26 – The St. Louis Cardinals announce the re-hiring of Tony La Russa as manager for 2010, and the surprise hiring of Mark McGwire as hitting coach, replacing Hal McRae.
- October 28 – The Philadelphia Phillies defeat the New York Yankees, 6–1, in Game 1 of the World Series at Yankee Stadium. Phillies pitcher Cliff Lee gives up an unearned run on six hits, while striking out 10 without walking a batter in a complete game effort. Chase Utley leads the Philadelphia attack with two solo home runs off left-handed CC Sabathia, the losing pitcher. It is the first time a left-handed batter has hit two homers off a lefty pitcher since Babe Ruth, when he did it against Bill Sherdel of the St. Louis Cardinals in Game 4 of the 1928 World Series. With a walk in the first inning, Utley also sets a Major League Baseball record by reaching base safely in his 26th consecutive postseason game, breaking the 25-game mark of Boog Powell from 1966 to 1971.
- October 29 – The New York Yankees even the World Series at a game apiece with a 3–1 victory against the Philadelphia Phillies. In the biggest start of his career, A. J. Burnett throws seven solid innings to get his first postseason win, holding the Phillies to only one run and four hits, while Mark Teixeira and Hideki Matsui provide the offensive support with solo home runs off Pedro Martínez, the losing pitcher. Mariano Rivera throws two scoreless innings in relief and earns the save.
- October 31 – The New York Yankees beat the Philadelphia Phillies 8–5, at Citizens Bank Park, to take a 2–1 advantage in the World Series. Alex Rodriguez belts the first video-reviewed home run in World Series history to support another winning Andy Pettitte effort, while Nick Swisher and Hideki Matsui add solo shots. Cole Hamels is the losing pitcher. Pettitte, who overcomes two homers from Jayson Werth, earns his Major League-leading 17th postseason win. Phillies catcher Carlos Ruíz hits a late homer in a lost cause.

=== November ===
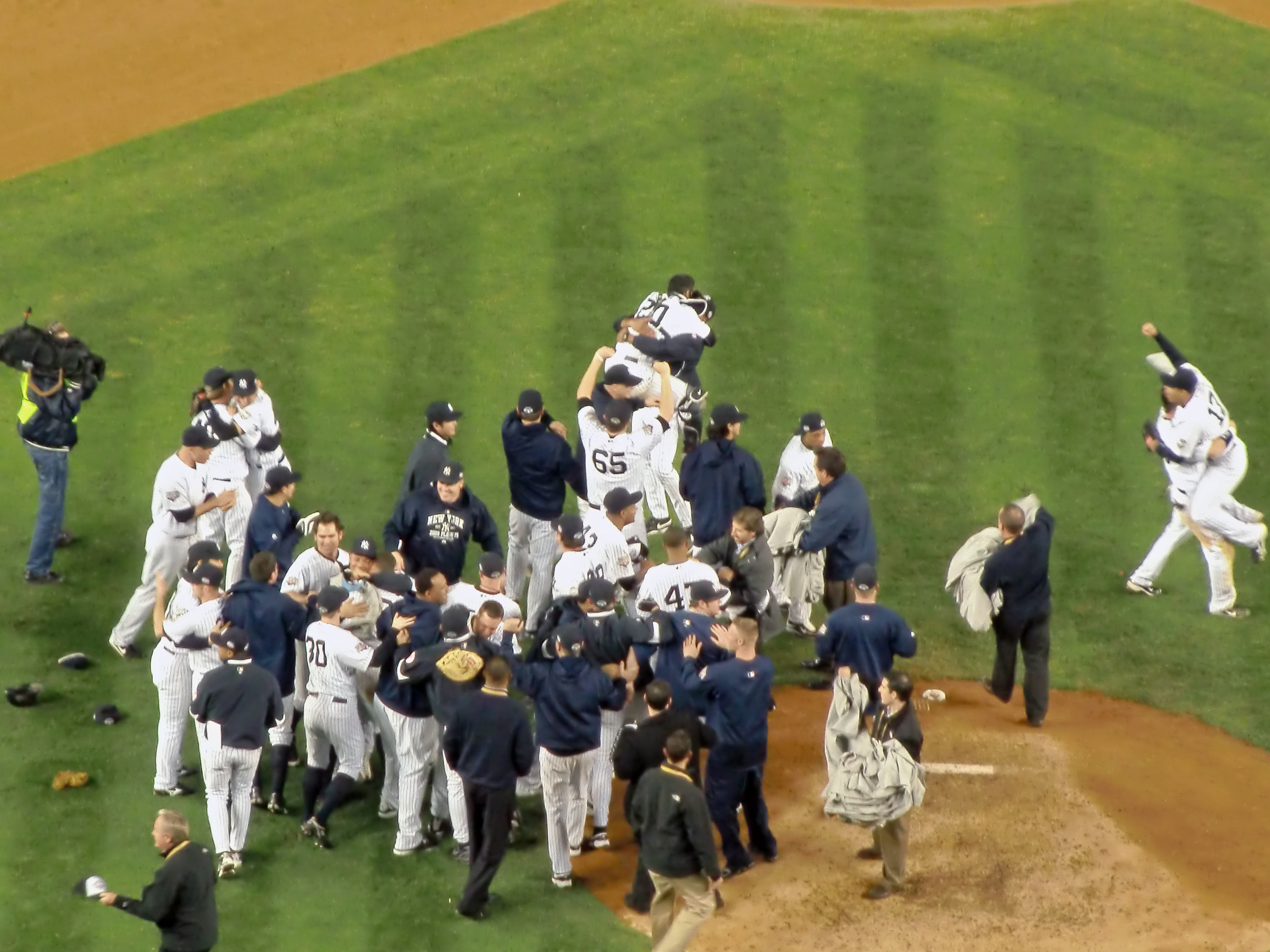
New York Yankees celebrate after their 7–3 win against the Philadelphia Phillies and win the franchise's 27th World Series championship.

- November 1 – The New York Yankees put themselves one win away from their 27th World Series title, after a three-run rally in the ninth inning, to beat the Philadelphia Phillies 7–4. Johnny Damon sparks the rally with a two-out single and two stolen bases off reliever and loser Brad Lidge, before a hit-by-pitch to Mark Teixeira and a go-ahead RBI double by Alex Rodriguez. A two-run, RBI-single by Jorge Posada seals the victory. Both starters, Yankees' CC Sabathia and Phillies' Joe Blanton, give a good pitching effort. Joba Chamberlain is credited with the victory after one inning of relief, while Mariano Rivera earns the save. Damon also singles, doubles, scores and drives in a run early in the game. The Phillies' offense is led by Chase Utley, who hits an RBI double and his third home run of the Series, while Pedro Feliz adds a solo homer.
- November 2 – The Philadelphia Phillies get an 8–6 victory over the New York Yankees, which forces the World Series to Game 6 at Yankee Stadium. Chase Utley hits two home runs with four RBI and joins Reggie Jackson as the only players who have batted five home runs in the Series, a record that Jackson set in 1977, which gave him the nickname "Mr. October". Cliff Lee improves to 4–0 with a 1.56 ERA in his first postseason and Ryan Madson earns the save, while Raúl Ibañez adds a homer and two RBI. For the Yankees, Johnny Damon goes 3-for-4 with two runs and one RBI, while A. J. Burnett has a poor start, giving up six runs in just two-plus innings and is credited with the loss.
- November 4 – The New York Yankees beat the Philadelphia Phillies 7–3 in Game 6 of the World Series, to clinch their 27th World Championship title, the most in all of sports. Yankees DH Hideki Matsui, who gains Most Valuable Player honors, drives in six runs, tying the record set by Bobby Richardson (1960 WS) and Will Clark (1989 NLCS) for most runs batted in a postseason game, while Andy Pettitte, pitching on three days' rest, becomes the first pitcher to start and win the clincher in all three postseason rounds. Pettitte beat Minnesota and the Anaheim Angels in the earlier AL playoffs. Philadelphia falls two wins short of becoming the first NL team to repeat as World Series champions since the 1975–'76 Cincinnati Reds. Phillies second baseman Chase Utley ties Reggie Jackson's record with five home runs in a Series, but first baseman Ryan Howard strikes out 13 times to set a record in the Classic. The clincher marks the sixth time New York has defeated the defending champ in the Series.
- November 10 – MLB general managers fail to take a vote on expanding instant replay following a postseason filled with blown calls by umpires, according to Jimmie Lee Solomon, executive vice president of baseball operations in the commissioner's office.
- November 23 – Joe Mauer of the Minnesota Twins becomes only the second catcher in 33 years to win the American League Most Valuable Player Award, finishing first in a near-unanimous vote. Mauer, who set a major league record for highest batting average by a catcher and won his third batting title, receives 27 of 28 first-place votes and 387 points in balloting by the BBWAA. New York Yankees teammates Mark Teixeira (225 points) and Derek Jeter (193) follow. The only other player to get a first-place vote is Miguel Cabrera, of the Detroit Tigers, who finishes in fourth place with 171 points, one point ahead of the Los Angeles Angels' Kendrys Morales.
- November 24 – Albert Pujols of the St. Louis Cardinals receives his third National League MVP Award, tying eight others who also had three. Only Barry Bonds has more with seven. Pujols, who also won in 2005 and 2008, receives all 32 first-place votes and 448 points in balloting announced by the BBWAA. Florida's Hanley Ramírez, the NL batting champion, is second with 233 points, followed by Philadelphia's Ryan Howard (217) and Milwaukee's Prince Fielder (203).
- November 30:
  - Derek Jeter is named the Sports Illustrated Sportsman of the Year, becoming the first member of the New York Yankees to win the prestigious award.
  - Nelson Díaz, a top umpire in Cuban baseball, defects to the United States. Díaz worked in the Olympics and the 2006 World Baseball Classic; called the exhibition game between the Cubans and Orioles at Baltimore in 1999, and also participated in World Cups and the Pan American Games, among many other international tournaments.

=== December ===
- December 1 – The Los Angeles Dodgers confirm that broadcaster Vin Scully will return to the booth for his 61st season in 2010. His 60 years of service is the longest tenure of any broadcaster in sports history, according to the Dodgers. Scully, who turned 82 on November 29, entered the Hall of Fame in 1982.
- December 2 – Michael Weiner is confirmed as the new executive director of the MLB Players Association, succeeding Donald Fehr, who had held the position since 1983.
- December 7 – Umpire Doug Harvey and former manager Whitey Herzog are elected to the Hall of Fame by the Veterans Committee.
- December 16 – In separate deals, the Philadelphia Phillies send left-handed pitcher Cliff Lee to the Seattle Mariners in exchange for minor league right-handers Phillippe Aumont and JC Ramirez and outfielder Tyson Gillies, and acquire right-hander Roy Halladay and cash considerations from the Toronto Blue Jays in exchange for minor league right-hander Kyle Drabek, outfielder Michael Taylor and catcher Travis d'Arnaud. Additionally, Halladay agrees to a three-year, $60 million contract extension with the Phillies that includes a $20 million vesting option for a fourth season.
- December 18 – After one tumultuous season in Chicago, Cubs deal outfielder Milton Bradley to the Seattle Mariners for right-handed pitcher Carlos Silva and cash. Silva was limited to only eight games and 30.1 innings in 2009 by shoulder injuries.
- December 22 – Sports Illustrated names St. Louis Cardinals first baseman Albert Pujols as number 9 on its list of the Top 20 Male Athletes of the Decade.
- December 23 – Major League Baseball ensures its first decade of labor peace since the 1960s by agreeing to a five-year contract with umpires that runs through 2014.
- December 28
  - Sports Illustrated publishes the names of the players and manager on its MLB All-Decade Team, and chooses the New York Yankees as the MLB Top Team of the Decade.
  - The Fort Wayne TinCaps are named the 2009 MiLBY winner for Overall and Class A Team of the Year. The Danville Braves win the 2009 MiLBY award for the best Short-Season Team, and the San Jose Giants are named the best Class A Advanced Team. The Akron Aeros earn MLB.com's Double-A team of the Year honors, and the Durham Bulls are named MLB.com's Triple-A Minor League Team of the Year.
  - The New York Mets sign reliever Kelvim Escobar to a one-year deal.
- December 29 – The San Francisco Giants sign Mark DeRosa to a two-year, $12 million contract.
- December 30
  - Detroit Tigers catcher Gerald Laird and his younger brother, Brandon Laird, a prospect in the Yankees' Minor League system, are arrested on suspicion of assault and disorderly conduct in Phoenix, Arizona, following a brawl after a Phoenix Suns game at U.S. Airways Arena. The two ballplayers, plus another man were arrested after an incident at an arena lounge.
  - The Arizona Diamondbacks sign second baseman Kelly Johnson to a one-year, $2.35 million contract.
- December 31 – The Chicago Cubs sign free agent Marlon Byrd to a three-year, $15 million contract. Byrd will play center field for the Cubs in 2010, while Kosuke Fukudome shifts back to right.

== Movies ==
- Calvin Marshall
- The Perfect Game

== Deaths ==
=== January ===
- January 4 – Matt Sczesny, 76, longtime Boston Red Sox scout credited with signing players such as Bob Stanley, John Valentin and Mo Vaughn
- January 5 – Carl Pohlad, 93, owner of the Minnesota Twins since 1984 who oversaw World Series titles in 1987 and 1991
- January 6 – Nino Bongiovanni, 97, outfielder who hit .259 in 166 games for the Cincinnati Reds from 1938 to 1939
- January 9 – Dave Roberts, 64, pitcher who posted a 103–125 record with eight teams from 1969 to 1981, ended second in the National League in earned run average in 1971, and was a member of the 1979 World Series champion Pittsburgh Pirates
- January 9 – Frank Williams, 50, relief pitcher who posted a 24–14 record with a 3.00 ERA and eight saves in 333 games for the San Francisco Giants, Cincinnati Reds and Detroit Tigers from 1984 to 1989
- January 11 – Red Rush, 81, play-by-play broadcaster for three MLB clubs between 1965 and 1984, notably the Chicago White Sox and Kansas City/Oakland Athletics
- January 13 – Preston Gómez, 85, Cuban-born manager of three teams who was the first manager of the San Diego Padres; briefly an infielder with the 1944 Washington Senators, later managed the Houston Astros and Chicago Cubs, and also was a longtime coach and scout
- January 14 – Mike Derrick, 65, backup outfielder/first baseman who hit .212 in 24 games for the 1970 Boston Red Sox
- January 15 – Tommy Jones, 54, former minor league utilityman and manager, coach for 2004 Arizona Diamondbacks, and longtime player-development executive for D-Backs
- January 16 – Craig Stimac, 54, backup catcher who hit .203 in 29 games for the San Diego Padres from 1980 to 1981, and later hit .400 with 95 home runs and 371 RBI in Italian baseball from 1984 through 1989
- January 22 – Bill Werber, 100, oldest living ex-major leaguer; a career .271 hitter who led the American League in stolen bases three times; played with Babe Ruth, Lou Gehrig, Jimmie Foxx and Lefty Grove in stints with the New York Yankees and Boston Red Sox, and hit .370 as the third baseman on the 1940 World Series champion Cincinnati Reds.
- January 24 – Len Perme, 91, pitcher who played briefly for the Chicago White Sox in 1942 and 1946, and one of the oldest living major league ballplayers
- January 25 – Ed Lyons, 85, second baseman for the 1947 Washington Senators, who later became a successful manager in the St. Louis Cardinals minor league system (1955–1957), coached for the Minnesota Twins (1976), and served as a scout for the Chicago Cubs (1977–1981) and Montreal Expos (1982–1983)
- January 26 – Roy Johnson, 49, backup outfielder who played from 1982 to 1985 for the Montreal Expos
- January 28 – Gene Corbett, 95, utility infielder who hit .120 with two home runs and 10 RBI in 37 games for the Philadelphia Phillies (1936–1938), and later managed in the St. Louis Cardinals minor league system (1947–1952)
- January 29 – Geraldine Bureker, 84, outfielder for the Racine Belles of the All-American Girls Professional Baseball League
- January 31 – Bob Scherbarth, backup catcher for the 1950 Boston Red Sox

=== February ===
- February 2 – James Atkins, 87, pitcher for the Boston Red Sox in the 1950s
- February 2 – Kazuhiro Yamauchi, 76, Hall of Fame NPB outfielder and manager
- February 4 – Ramón Hernández, 68, Puerto Rican relief pitcher who posted a 23–15 record with a 3.03 ERA and 46 saves in 337 games for four teams between 1967 and 1977
- February 7 – John Gabler, 78, New York Yankees pitcher from 1959 to 1960, and one of the first picks of expansion Washington Senators in 1961
- February 12 – Ted Uhlaender, 68, outfielder who hit .263 with 36 home runs and 285 RBI in 898 games for the Twins, Indians and Reds from 1965 to 1972
- February 18 – Ben Flowers, 81, knuckleball specialist who posted a 3–7 record with a 4.49 ERA and three saves in 76 games for the Red Sox (1951, 1953), Tigers (1955), Cardinals (1955–1956) and Phillies (1956)
- February 20 – Larry H. Miller, 64, owner of the NBA Utah Jazz and Pacific Coast League Salt Lake Bees
- February 23 – Joe Tepsic, 85, utility player for the 1946 Brooklyn Dodgers
- February 28 – Tom Sturdivant, 78, pitcher for the New York Yankees from 1955 to 1959 and a member of the 1956 World Series champions; also pitched for six other teams from 1959 to 1964

=== March ===
- March 6 – Eduardo Rodríguez, 57, Puerto Rican relief pitcher who posted a 42–36 record with a 3.89 ERA and 32 saves for the Milwaukee Brewers and Kansas City Royals between 1973 and 1979
- March 8 – Ed Wolfe, 80, relief pitcher for the 1952 Pittsburgh Pirates
- March 10 – Joe Pactwa, 60, relief pitcher who posted a 1–0 record with a 3.86 ERA for the 1975 California Angels
- March 15 – Elmer Weingartner, 90, shortstop who played for the 1945 Cleveland Indians, and one of many ballplayers who only appeared in the majors during World War II
- March 17 – Whitey Lockman, 82, All-Star first baseman for 15 Major League seasons; best known for scoring ahead of Bobby Thomson on the historic Shot Heard 'Round the World home run in the 1951 NL playoff against the Brooklyn Dodgers; who hit a homer in his first major league at-bat with the 1945 New York Giants, and later managed the Chicago Cubs from July 27, 1972 to July 21, 1974
- March 24 – George Kell, 86, Hall of Fame third baseman and 10-time All-Star who edged Ted Williams for the 1949 American League batting title; hit more than .300 nine times, and later became a Detroit Tigers broadcaster for nearly 40 years
- March 25 – Johnny Blanchard, 76, backup catcher/outfielder who played eight major league seasons and appeared in five consecutive World Series with the New York Yankees from 1960 to 1964
- March 25 – Arthur Richman, 83, sportswriter for the New York Daily Mirror, and later a front office executive for the New York Yankees and Mets teams
- March 28 – Earle Brucker Jr., 83, catcher for the 1948 Philadelphia Athletics; his father, Earle Sr., was an MLB catcher, coach and interim manager
- March 30 – Herman Franks, 95, catcher who played between 1939 and 1949 for the St. Louis Cardinals, Brooklyn Dodgers, Philadelphia Athletics and New York Giants, and later managed the San Francisco Giants (1965–1968) and Chicago Cubs (1977–79); also a longtime coach under Leo Durocher

=== April ===
- April 9 – Nick Adenhart, 22, rookie pitcher for the Los Angeles Angels of Anaheim
- April 12 – Gene Handley, 94, infielder who played 125 games for the Philadelphia Athletics from 1946 to 1947; brother of Lee Handley
- April 13 – Mark "The Bird" Fidrych, 54, All-Star pitcher for the Detroit Tigers, who won the 1976 AL Rookie of the Year Award after going 19–9 with a 2.34 ERA and 24 complete games
- April 13 – Harry Kalas, 73, Hall of Fame play-by-play announcer of the Philadelphia Phillies from 1971 until his death; previously member of Houston Astros' broadcast team from 1965 to 1970; longtime voice of NFL Films
- April 15 – Ed Blake, 83, pitcher for the Cincinnati Reds (1951–1953) and Kansas City Athletics (1957)
- April 15 – Merle Harmon, 82, play-by-play announcer for five MLB clubs between 1955 and 1989, also noted as a football broadcaster
- April 22 – Ron Cash, 59, infielder/outfielder who hit .297 for the Detroit Tigers from 1973 to 1974
- April 27 – Danny Morejón, 78, Cuban outfielder for the 1958 Cincinnati Redlegs
- April 29 – Jack Lohrke, 85, third baseman who played from 1947 through 1953 for the New York Giants and Philadelphia Phillies

=== May ===
- May 5 – George Williams, 69, utility who batted .230 in 59 games for the Philadelphia Phillies, Houston Colt .45s and Kansas City Athletics from 1961 to 1964
- May 6 – Ed Redys, 87, former minor-league pitcher who served as a coach for the 1950–1951 St. Louis Browns
- May 7 – Danny Ozark, 85, manager of the Philadelphia Phillies from 1973 to August 29, 1979 who led Phils to three consecutive National League East titles (1976–1978) and posted a 594–510 overall record in Philadelphia; acting manager of 1984 San Francisco Giants from August 5 to end of the season; previously, an MLB coach and minor-league player and manager in Los Angeles Dodgers' organization
- May 8 – Dom DiMaggio, 92, Boston Red Sox center fielder from 1940 to 1953; seven-time All-Star and younger brother of Vince and Joe DiMaggio; a .298 career hitter in 1399 games who hit safely in 34 consecutive games in 1949, which still ranks as the longest in Red Sox history
- May 8 – Eunice Taylor, 75, catcher and one of the original members of the All-American Girls Professional Baseball League, who in 1988 gained National Baseball Hall of Fame induction
- May 11 – Bill Kelso, 69, relief pitcher who posted a 12–5 record with a 3.13 ERA and 14 saves in four seasons for the Angels and Reds
- May 11 – Johnny Schaive, 74, second baseman who hit .232 for both the original and expansion Washington Senators teams from 1958 to 1963
- May 20 – Gabrielle Dawn Schoeneweis, 39, wife of Arizona Diamondbacks pitcher Scott Schoeneweis
- May 23 – Mary McCarty, 77, All-American Girls Professional Baseball League player
- May 31 – James Tillman, 89, Negro league baseball catcher who played for the Homestead Grays from 1941 to 1943

=== June ===
- June 5 – Richard Jacobs, 84, owner of the Cleveland Indians from 1986 to 2001
- June 8 – Frank Dasso, 91, pitcher who posted a 4–5 record for the Cincinnati Reds from 1945 to 1946
- June 9 – Bill Lillard, 90, shortstop who hit .244 with one home run and 22 RBI for the Philadelphia Athletics from 1939 to 1940
- June 9 – Ray Hamrick, 87, infielder for the Philadelphia Phillies from 1943 to 1944, and one of many ballplayers who only appeared in the majors during World War II
- June 9 – Jack Littrell, 80, shortstop for the Philadelphia and Kansas City Athletics (1952, 1954) and Chicago Cubs (1957)
- June 10 – Woodie Held, 77, IF/OF who hit .240 with 179 home runs and 559 RBI for seven American League teams from 1954 to 1969
- June 14 – Hal Woodeshick, 76, All-Star pitcher and a member of Houston's first Major League team, the Colt 45's, who led the National League with 23 saves in 1964
- June 17 – Dusty Rhodes, 82, New York Giants offensive hero during the four-game sweep of the Cleveland Indians in the 1954 World Series
- June 25 – Gene Patton, 82, infielder by trade, whose lone MLB appearance came as a pinch runner for the Boston Braves on June 17, 1944; he was promptly erased on a force play and thus did not score a run.
- June 30 – Jay Kleven, 59, backup catcher for the 1976 New York Mets

=== July ===
- July 1 – John Henry Moss, 90, who founded what would become the South Atlantic League in 1959 and headed the circuit until 2007
- July 8 – Hubert Simmons, 85, Negro league baseball pitcher who played for the Baltimore Elite Giants
- July 9 – Jessie Hollins, 39, relief pitcher who played briefly for the 1992 Chicago Cubs
- July 12 – Doris Barr, 87, pitcher and one of the original members of the All-American Girls Professional Baseball League, who earned three inductions into several Baseball Halls of Fame across Canada and United States
- July 13 – Alec Distaso, 60, relief pitcher who played for the 1969 Chicago Cubs
- July 17 – Jim Kirby, 86, pinch-hitter for the 1949 Chicago Cubs
- July 19 – Sue Burns, 58, majority owner of the San Francisco Giants
- July 20 – Carlton Willey, 78, pitcher for the Milwaukee Braves and New York Mets and 1958 TSN Rookie of the Year, who made history in September 1963 while pitching for the Mets, when he retired San Francisco Giants brothers Jesús, Matty and Felipe Alou in the same inning, to set a major league record by retiring three siblings batting consecutively
- July 27 – Luis Quintana, 57, Puerto Rican relief pitcher for the California Angels from 1974 to 1975

=== August ===
- August 8 – Cal Ermer, 85, manager of the Minnesota Twins from June 9, 1967 through 1968; second baseman who played one MLB game with 1947 Washington Senators; coach for three other MLB teams between 1962 and 1977; longtime minor-league skipper and scout
- August 10 – Merlyn Mantle, 77, American author and widow of Hall of Famer Mickey Mantle
- August 13 – Fred Brocklander, 69, National League umpire who officiated in 1,514 league games between 1979 and 1990, along with 1984 MLB All-Star Game
- August 17 – Davey Williams, 81, All-Star second baseman for the New York Giants from 1949 to 1955 and a member of the 1954 World Series champions; coached for 1956–1957 Giants after his playing career was ended by a back injury
- August 23 – William J. Williams Sr., 93, Cincinnati business executive who was a key member (with his brother James) of the 13-party syndicate that bought the Reds in December 1966; co-owner of the Reds, with James, from 1981 to 1984; from 1967 to 1984, the Reds captured four National League pennants and two World Series titles; father of William Jr. and Thomas Williams, members of Robert Castellini's group when they successfully purchased the Reds in 2006
- August 29 – Jackie Collum, 82, pitcher who compiled a 32–28 record and a 4.15 ERA for the Cardinals, Reds, Dodgers, Twins, Indians and Cubs between 1951 and 1958
- August 30 – Jack Phillips, 87, first baseman who hit .283 for three different teams, and a member of the 1947 World Champions New York Yankees

=== September ===
- September 4 – Buddy Blattner, 89, second baseman who hit .247 with 16 home runs and 21 RBI in 272 games for the St. Louis Cardinals (1942), New York Giants (1946–1948) and Philadelphia Phillies (1949), whose career as a broadcaster included seven years (1953–1959) on ABC Game of the Week with co-host Dizzy Dean
- September 13 – Lonny Frey, 99, All-Star infielder for five teams from 1939 to 1948, including the World Champions 1940 Cincinnati Reds and 1947 New York Yankees, who was recognized as the oldest living All-Star and the second-oldest living major leaguer
- September 17 – Dorothy Montgomery, 85, All-American Girls Professional Baseball League infielder for the Muskegon Lassies
- September 21 – Purnal Goldy, 71, backup outfielder who hit .231 in 80 games for the 1962–1963 Detroit Tigers
- September 24 – Del Bates, 69, backup catcher for the 1970 Philadelphia Phillies
- September 28 – Don Thompson, 85, backup outfielder who hit .218 in 217 games with the Boston Braves and Brooklyn Dodgers from 1949 to 1954
- September 29 – Jean Ladd, 86, All-American Girls Professional Baseball League pitcher and infielder for the Kenosha Comets
- September 29 – Humberto Robinson, 79, the first Panamanian-born Major Leaguer, who pitched from 1955 through 1960 for the Milwaukee Braves, Cleveland Indians and Philadelphia Phillies

=== October ===
- October 4 – Barry Lersch, 65, relief pitcher who posted an 18–32 record with a 3.82 ERA for the Phillies and Cardinals from 1969 to 1974
- October 5 – Brian Powell, 35, pitcher for the Tigers, Astros, Giants and Phillies from 1998 to 2004, who also hurled a no-hitter in the minors while pitching for the 2001 New Orleans Zephyrs
- October 10 – Larry Jansen, 89, two-time All-Star pitcher for the New York Giants (1947–1954) and Cincinnati Reds (1956), who won 21 games in his rookie season while leading the National League with a .808 winning percentage, and was the winning pitcher in the 1951 playoff game decided by Bobby Thomson's Shot Heard 'Round the World; later, pitching coach for the San Francisco Giants and Chicago Cubs between 1961 and 1973
- October 22 – Herman Reich, 91, 1B/RF who had the rare distinction of being part of three different transactions in his only major league season (1949; Indians, Senators and Cubs)
- October 29 – Bill Kirk, 75, pitcher for the 1961 Kansas City Athletics, who threw a no-hitter in the minors while pitching for the 1960 Lancaster Red Roses
- October 30 – Howie Schultz, 87, one of the first American athletes to play baseball and basketball at professional level, appearing in 470 major league games at first base with the Brooklyn Dodgers, Philadelphia Phillies and Cincinnati Reds (1943 to 1948), and as a player/coach in four seasons for the Anderson Packers of the NBL/NBA (1946–'47 to 1949–'50)

=== November ===
- November 3 – Ron Moeller, 71, relief pitcher who went 6–9 with a 5.78 ERA in 52 games for the Baltimore Orioles, Washington Senators and California Angels between 1956 and 1963
- November 6 – Tommy Reis, 95, who pitched for the Philadelphia Phillies and Boston Bees during the 1938 season, and the last living former bigleaguer to play at Baker Bowl, the old Phillies' home ballpark
- November 6 – Bob Roselli, 77, backup catcher who hit .219 in 68 games for the Milwaukee Braves and Chicago White Sox
- November 7 – Bob Dillinger, 91, All-Star third baseman who hit .306 over his six MLB seasons; led the American League hitters in stolen bases in three consecutive seasons (1947–1949) and with 207 hits in 1948
- November 8 – Ellen Ahrndt, 87, second basewoman for the 1944 South Bend Blue Sox of the All-American Girls Professional Baseball League
- November 13 – Ron Klimkowski, 65, relief pitcher who posted an 8–12 record with a 2.90 ERA and four saves for the Yankees and Athletics from 1969 to 1972
- November 16 – Bucky Williams, 102, infielder for the Pittsburgh Crawfords and the Homestead Grays in a career that began in the 1920s and lasted through 1936, who was the last living Negro league baseball player in Pittsburgh

=== December ===
- December 1 – Tommy Henrich, 96, five-time All-Star outfielder for the New York Yankees between 1937 and 1950, who hit the first game-ending home run in World Series history against Don Newcombe to beat the Brooklyn Dodgers, 1–0, in the 1949 opener
- December 24 – Stan Benjamin, 95, outfielder who appeared in 241 games for the Philadelphia Phillies (1939–1942) and Cleveland Indians (1945); later a Houston Astros' scout for nearly 40 years
- December 25 – Bill Burich, 91, infielder in 27 career games for 1942 and 1946 Phillies

== See also ==
- 2009 Major League Baseball season
- 2009 Nippon Professional Baseball season
