= 2009 Detroit Tigers season =

Major League Baseball season

2009 Detroit Tigers
- League: American League
- Division: Central
- Ballpark: Comerica Park
- City: Detroit, Michigan
- Record: 86–77 (.528)
- Divisional place: 2nd
- Owners: Mike Ilitch
- General managers: Dave Dombrowski
- Managers: Jim Leyland
- Television: Fox Sports Detroit (Mario Impemba, Rod Allen)
- Radio: Detroit Tigers Radio Network (Dan Dickerson, Jim Price, John Keating)
- Stats: ESPN.com; Baseball Reference

The 2009 Detroit Tigers season was the team's 109th season. The Tigers' new slogan for 2009 was "Always a Tiger." It replaced the 2006–2008 slogan "Who's Your Tiger?"

The Tigers ended the season on October 6 with a 6–5 loss in 12 innings to the Minnesota Twins in the tie-breaker game to win the American League Central. The Tigers spent 146 days in first place and became the first team in Major League history to lose a three-game lead with four games left to play.

== 2008–2009 offseason events ==
- The Tigers announced on September 29, 2008, that they would not pick up the $12 million option on shortstop Édgar Rentería's contract, although the team did not rule out the possibility of re-signing him in the offseason. The buyout was worth $3 million. The option was part of the contract Rentería signed with the Boston Red Sox in 2004. He had changed teams twice since then. The roster move was finalized on October 30. The team could have offered him arbitration and received a draft pick from Rentería's new team, but formally chose not to offer Rentería arbitration on December 1. On December 4, 2008, Rentería signed a two-year deal with the San Francisco Giants.
- On October 17, the Tigers hired Rick Knapp as their new pitching coach, replacing Chuck Hernandez, who took part of the blame for the team's poor pitching in 2008. Knapp had worked for 12 years as the minor league pitching coordinator for the Minnesota Twins.
- The Red Sox claimed Tiger reliever Virgil Vasquez off waivers on October 28. Vasquez had spent the entire season as a starter with the Toledo Mud Hens, the Tigers' AAA affiliate.
- On December 8, the Tigers acquired catcher Gerald Laird from the Texas Rangers, in exchange for minor league pitching prospects Guillermo Moscoso and Carlos Melo.
- On December 10, the Tigers traded outfielder Matt Joyce to the Tampa Bay Rays for starting pitcher Edwin Jackson. Joyce had divided his time in the previous season between the Tigers and Class AAA Toledo.
- On December 12, the Tigers signed infielder Ramón Santiago to a one-year contract, avoiding arbitration.
- Also on December 12, in a Rule 5 draft, the Tigers selected left-handed pitcher Kyle Bloom from the Pittsburgh Pirates double-A affiliate, Altoona. Detroit would return Bloom to the Pirates in March 2009. In the same draft, they lost James Skelton, a left-handed hitting catcher, to the Arizona Diamondbacks. Skelton was on Detroit's 2008 40-man roster but was not included on the 40-man cast for 2009.
- On December 13, relief pitcher Aquilino López became the Tigers' only arbitration-eligible player this offseason to not be offered a contract by the team, making him a free agent.
- On December 15, the Tigers finalized a one-year, $1 million contract with free-agent shortstop Adam Everett, previously with the Minnesota Twins.
- On December 18, former Marlins catcher Matt Treanor signed with the Tigers.
- On January 6, 2009, the Tigers signed former utility outfielder Alexis Gómez to a minor-league contract. Gómez had played on the 2006 World Series team, but had spent the subsequent two seasons in the Colorado Rockies and Florida Marlins systems.
- On January 13, the Tigers signed Taiwanese sidearm relief pitcher Fu-Te Ni to a minor-league contract with an invitation to training camp. Ni had pitched for Taiwan at the 2008 Summer Olympics in Beijing.
- On January 14, the team avoided arbitration with relief pitcher Fernando Rodney and utility outfielder Marcus Thames by signing both to one-year contracts.
- On January 20, the team avoided arbitration with catcher Gerald Laird, starting pitcher Edwin Jackson, and relievers Joel Zumaya and Bobby Seay by signing each to one-year contracts. The same day, the Tigers signed Juan Rincón to a minor-league contract with an invite to spring training.
- On January 26, the Tigers signed relief pitcher Brandon Lyon to a one-year contract. The same day, the team signed Timo Pérez to a minor-league contract.
- On February 3, the Tigers avoided arbitration with starting pitcher Justin Verlander by signing him to a one-year, $3.7 million contract.
- On February 4, the organization outrighted pitcher Eddie Bonine to the Mud Hens after clearing waivers. He had spent most of the 2008 season with the Mud Hens.
- On February 24, the Tigers came to terms with relief pitchers Clay Rapada and Freddy Dolsi, and outfielders Brent Clevlen, Ryan Raburn and Wilkin Ramírez, all to one-year contracts.
- On March 19, the Tigers outrighted relief pitcher Macay McBride to Toledo.
- On March 29, the Tigers placed relievers Joel Zumaya and Dontrelle Willis on the 15-day disabled list. Zumaya, who had had a history of shoulder problems, was due to be activated April 11, one day after the Tigers' home opener against Texas. Willis was placed on the list due to an anxiety disorder.
- On March 30, the Tigers acquired speedy outfielder Josh Anderson from the Atlanta Braves for pitching prospect Rudy Darrow. Anderson hit .294 with three home runs, 12 RBIs and ten stolen bases with Atlanta in 2008.
- In a surprise move, the Tigers released nine-time All-Star Gary Sheffield on March 31. Sheffield, who joined the Tigers before the 2007 season, was one home run short of the 500 club when he was released.

== Trades ==
On July 30, the Tigers traded outfielder Josh Anderson to Kansas City for cash considerations.

On July 31, the Tigers traded rookie left-handed pitcher Luke French and left-handed pitcher Mauricio Robles to Seattle for veteran left-handed starting pitcher Jarrod Washburn.

On August 17, the Tigers traded pitcher Brett Jacobson to Baltimore for Aubrey Huff.

== Season highlights ==
The Tigers' home opener was on April 10 against the Texas Rangers. The Tigers won that game 15–2, which included a grand slam by Miguel Cabrera and finished the series with a sweep.

The Tigers swept their rivals the Indians in Cleveland during the second weekend of May. The Tigers also completed back-to-back sweeps in May, against the Athletics and the Rangers. The Tigers also completed back-to-back sweeps in late June, over the Brewers and Cubs.

On May 15, the Tigers hit 2 grand slams in a game, only the third time in team history.

On June 19, Instant replay was used twice in the Tigers' 10–4 victory over the Milwaukee Brewers at Comerica Park, the first time that's happened in league history. Miguel Cabrera's third-inning single off the top of the wall is called a home run after instant replay review shows that it had actually cleared the wall. Contrarily, Dusty Ryan's fourth-inning home run was overturned to a ground rule double. Later that weekend, the Tigers won the series with a sweep.

On May 19, Dontrelle Willis and four relief pitchers combined to throw a one-hitter in a 4–0 Tigers Victory. Willis had a stretch in which he retired 17 straight batters

The Tigers completed back-to-back sweeps against the Indians and Rays in early September.

The Tigers held the 1st-place position from May 8 until they lost it to the Twins in the tiebreaker game on October 6.

The Tigers swept the Indians for the third time of the season in late September.

== Regular season ==
=== Season standings ===
AL Central
Team	W	L	Pct.	GB	Home	Road
Minnesota Twins	87	76	.534	—	49‍–‍33	38‍–‍43
Detroit Tigers	86	77	.528	1	51‍–‍30	35‍–‍47
Chicago White Sox	79	83	.488	7½	43‍–‍38	36‍–‍45
Cleveland Indians	65	97	.401	21½	35‍–‍46	30‍–‍51
Kansas City Royals	65	97	.401	21½	33‍–‍48	32‍–‍49

=== Roster ===
2009 Detroit Tigers
Roster
Pitchers: 38 Jeremy Bonderman; 49 Eddie Bonine; 40 Freddy Dolsi; 41 Casey Fien; 43 Alfredo Figaro; 53 Lucas French; 58 Armando Galarraga; 36 Edwin Jackson; 40 Chris Lambert; 37 Brandon Lyon; 31 Zach Miner; 59 Fu-Te Ni; 45 Ryan Perry; 48 Rick Porcello; 50 Clay Rapada; 59 Juan Rincón; 29 Nate Robertson; 56 Fernando Rodney; 44 Bobby Seay; 35 Justin Verlander; 53 Jarrod Washburn; 21 Dontrelle Willis; 54 Joel Zumaya	Catchers: 13 Alex Avila; 8 Gerald Laird; 55 Dusty Ryan; 57 Dane Sardinha; 20 Matt Treanor; Infielders: 24 Miguel Cabrera; 27 Brent Dlugach; 4 Adam Everett; 15 Brandon Inge; 19 Jeff Larish; 14 Plácido Polanco; 39 Ramón Santiago; Outfielders: 13 Josh Anderson; 28 Curtis Granderson; 9 Carlos Guillén; 32 Don Kelly; 30 Magglio Ordóñez; 25 Ryan Raburn; 60 Wilkin Ramírez; 33 Marcus Thames; 34 Clete Thomas; Other batters: 19 Aubrey Huff	Manager: 10 Jim Leyland; Coaches: 17 Rafael Belliard (infield); 51 Jeff Jones (bullpen); 52 Rick Knapp (pitching); 22 Gene Lamont (third base); 12 Lloyd McClendon (hitting); 99 Scott Pickens (bullpen catcher); 18 Andy Van Slyke (first base)

=== Record vs. opponents ===
2009 American League record Source: MLB Standings Grid – 2009
Team	BAL	BOS	CWS	CLE	DET	KC	LAA	MIN	NYY	OAK	SEA	TB	TEX	TOR	NL
Baltimore	–	2–16	5–4	2–5	3–5	4–4	2–8	3–2	5–13	1–5	4–5	8–10	5–5	9–9	11–7
Boston	16–2	–	4–4	7–2	6–1	5–3	4–5	4–2	9–9	5–5	2–4	9–9	2–7	11–7	11–7
Chicago	4–5	4−4	–	10–8	9–9	9–9	5–4	6−12	3–4	4–5	4–5	6–2	2–4	1–6	12–6
Cleveland	5–2	2–7	8–10	–	4–14	10–8	2–4	8–10	3–5	2–5	6–4	5–3	1–8	4–4	5–13
Detroit	5–3	1–6	9–9	14–4	–	9–9	5–4	7–12	1–5	5–4	5–4	5–2	7–2	3–5	10–8
Kansas City	4–4	3–5	9–9	8–10	9–9	–	1–9	6–12	2–4	2–6	5–4	1–9	3–3	4–3	8–10
Los Angeles	8–2	5–4	4–5	4–2	4–5	9–1	–	6–4	5–5	12–7	10–9	4–2	8–11	4–4	14–4
Minnesota	2–3	2–4	12–6	10–8	12–7	12–6	4–6	–	0–7	4–6	5–5	3–3	6–4	3–5	12–6
New York	13–5	9–9	4–3	5–3	5–1	4–2	5–5	7–0	–	7–2	6–4	11–7	5–4	12–6	10–8
Oakland	5–1	5–5	5–4	5–2	4–5	6–2	7–12	6–4	2–7	–	5–14	6–4	11–8	3–6	5–13
Seattle	5–4	4–2	5–4	4–6	4–5	4–5	9–10	5–5	4–6	14–5	–	5–3	8–11	3–4	11–7
Tampa Bay	10–8	9–9	2–6	3–5	2–5	9–1	2–4	3–3	7–11	4–6	3–5	–	3–6	14–4	13–5
Texas	5–5	7–2	4–2	8–1	2–7	3–3	11–8	4–6	4–5	8–11	11–8	6–3	–	5–5	9–9
Toronto	9–9	7–11	6–1	4–4	5–3	3–4	4–4	5–3	6–12	6–3	4–3	4–14	5–5	–	7–11

- Source: MLB Standings Grid – 2009

=== Game log ===
Legend
Tigers win	Tigers loss	Game postponed

2009 Game log
April (11–10)

#	Date	Opponent	Score	Win	Loss	Save	Attendance	Record
1	April 6	@ Blue Jays	L 12–5	Halladay (1–0)	Verlander (0–1)		48,027	0–1
2	April 7	@ Blue Jays	L 5–4	Ryan (1–0)	Lyon (0–1)		16,790	0–2
3	April 8	@ Blue Jays	W 5–1	Miner (1–0)	Litsch (0–1)		12,145	1–2
4	April 9	@ Blue Jays	L 6–2	Romero (1–0)	Porcello (0–1)		15,297	1–3
5	April 10	Rangers	W 15–2	Galarraga (1–0)	Benson (0–1)		44,588	2–3
6	April 11	Rangers	W 4–3	Robertson (1–0)	Harrison (0–1)	Rodney (1)	28,693	3–3
7	April 12	Rangers	W 6–4	Lyon (1–1)	Wilson (0–1)	Rodney (2)	18,905	4–3
8	April 13	White Sox	L 10–6	Floyd (1–1)	Miner (1–1)		21,850	4–4
	April 14	White Sox	Postponed (rain) – rescheduled for July 24					
9	April 15	White Sox	W 9–0	Galarraga (2–0)	Contreras (0–2)		20,212	5–4
10	April 17	@ Mariners	L 6–3	Hernández (2–0)	Verlander (0–2)	Morrow (3)	35,824	5–5
11	April 18	@ Mariners	W 2–0	Jackson (1–0)	Bédard (1–1)	Rodney (3)	31,966	6–5
12	April 19	@ Mariners	W 8–2	Porcello (1–1)	Silva (0–2)		30,450	7–5
13	April 21	@ Angels	L 4–3	Arredondo (1–0)	Lyon (1–2)	Fuentes (3)	41,627	7–6
14	April 22	@ Angels	W 12–10	Rincón (1–0)	Shields (0–2)		43,047	8–6
15	April 23	@ Angels	L 10–5	Palmer (1–0)	Jackson (1–1)		38,543	8–7
16	April 24	@ Royals	L 6–1	Greinke (4–0)	Porcello (1–2)		36,363	8–8
17	April 25	@ Royals	W 9–1	Miner (2–1)	Davies (1–1)		37,647	9–8
18	April 26	@ Royals	W 3–2	Galarraga (3–0)	Ponson (0–3)	Rodney (4)	13,520	10–8
19	April 27	Yankees	W 4–2	Verlander (1–2)	Sabathia (1–2)		28,784	11–8
20	April 28	Yankees	L 11–0	Hughes (1–0)	Perry (0–1)		25,519	11–9
21	April 29	Yankees	L 8–6	Chamberlain (1–0)	Porcello (1–3)		28,348	11–10

May (17–11)

#	Date	Opponent	Score	Win	Loss	Save	Attendance	Record
22	May 1	Indians	L 6–5	Pavano (1–3)	Galarraga (3–1)	Wood (5)	22,288	11–11
23	May 2	Indians	W 9–7	Zumaya (1–0)	Betancourt (0–1)	Rodney (5)	34,646	12–11
24	May 3	Indians	W 3–1	Verlander (2–2)	Lee (1–4)	Rodney (6)	27,411	13–11
25	May 4	Twins	L 7–2	Liriano (1–4)	Jackson (1–2)		21,298	13–12
26	May 5	Twins	W 9–0	Porcello (2–3)	Blackburn (2–2)		23,754	14–12
	May 6	@ White Sox	Postponed (rain) – rescheduled for June 8					
27	May 7	@ White Sox	L 6–0	Buehrle (5–0)	Galarraga (3–2)		27,475	14–13
28	May 8	@ Indians	W 1–0	Verlander (3–2)	Lee (1–5)		27,492	15–13
29	May 9	@ Indians	W 4–0	Jackson (2–2)	Carmona (1–4)		33,640	16–13
30	May 10	@ Indians	W 5–3	Porcello (3–3)	Reyes (1–1)		25,705	17–13
31	May 12	@ Twins	L 6–2	Slowey (5–1)	Galarraga (3–3)		24,807	17–14
32	May 13	@ Twins	L 14–10 (13)	Crain (2–1)	Lyon (1–3)		22,178	17–15
33	May 14	@ Twins	L 6–5	Breslow (1–1)	Seay (0–1)	Nathan (6)	26,046	17–16
34	May 15	Athletics	W 14–1	Jackson (3–2)	Anderson (0–4)		26,770	18–16
35	May 16	Athletics	W 9–1	Porcello (4–3)	Braden (3–5)		31,554	19–16
36	May 17	Athletics	W 11–7	Miner (3–1)	Cahill (2–3)		27,535	20–16
37	May 19	Rangers	W 4–0	Willis (1–0)	McCarthy (3–2)		23,756	21–16
38	May 20	Rangers	W 5–3	Verlander (4–2)	Harrison (4–3)	Rodney (7)	23,417	22–16
39	May 21	Rangers	W 4–3	Jackson (4–2)	Millwood (4–4)	Rodney (8)	34,356	23–16
40	May 22	Rockies	W 4–3	Porcello (5–3)	Jiménez (3–5)	Zumaya (1)	28,264	24–16
41	May 23	Rockies	L 4–3	Marquis (6–3)	Galarraga (3–4)	Street (6)	37,035	24–17
42	May 24	Rockies	L 3–1	Hammel (1–3)	Willis (1–1)	Street (7)	34,606	24–18
43	May 25	@ Royals	W 13–1	Verlander (5–2)	Meche (2–5)		34,524	25–18
44	May 26	@ Royals	L 6–1	Greinke (8–1)	Jackson (4–3)		16,366	25–19
45	May 27	@ Royals	W 8–3	Porcello (6–3)	Davies (2–4)		16,568	26–19
46	May 28	@ Orioles	L 5–1	Hernandez (1–0)	Galarraga (3–5)		11,937	26–20
47	May 29	@ Orioles	L 7–2	Bergesen (2–2)	Willis (1–2)		42,704	26–21
48	May 30	@ Orioles	W 6–3	Verlander (6–2)	Albers (0–2)	Rodney (9)	34,567	27–21
49	May 31	@ Orioles	W 3–0	Jackson (5–3)	Berken (1–1)	Rodney (10)	32,233	28–21

June (15–13)

#	Date	Opponent	Score	Win	Loss	Save	Attendance	Record
50	June 2	Red Sox	L 5–1	Matsuzaka (1–3)	Porcello (6–4)		25,914	28–22
51	June 3	Red Sox	L 10–5	Beckett (6–2)	Galarraga (3–6)		29,240	28–23
52	June 4	Red Sox	L 6–3	Wakefield (7–3)	Willis (1–3)	Papelbon (14)	31,353	28–24
53	June 5	Angels	L 2–1	Santana (1–2)	Rodney (0–1)	Fuentes (15)	31,187	28–25
54	June 6	Angels	W 2–1	Jackson (6–3)	Escobar (0–1)		32,367	29–25
55	June 7	Angels	W 9–6	Zumaya (2–0)	Arredondo (1–3)		32,074	30–25
56	June 8	@ White Sox	W 5–4	Zumaya (3–0)	Linebrink (2–3)	Rodney (11)		31–25
57	June 8	@ White Sox	L 6–1	Contreras (1–5)	Bonderman (0–1)		30,809	31–26
58	June 9	@ White Sox	W 7–6 (10)	Lyon (2–3)	Linebrink (2–4)		25,676	32–26
59	June 10	@ White Sox	W 2–1	Verlander (7–2)	Danks (4–5)		28,079	33–26
60	June 11	@ White Sox	L 4–3	Jenks (1–2)	Zumaya (3–1)		20,824	33–27
61	June 12	@ Pirates	W 3–1	Porcello (7–4)	Snell (1–7)	Rodney (12)	18,369	34–27
62	June 13	@ Pirates	L 9–3	Duke (7–4)	Galarraga (3–7)		31,411	34–28
63	June 14	@ Pirates	L 6–3	Ohlendorf (6–5)	Willis (1–4)	Capps (16)	27,565	34–29
64	June 16	@ Cardinals	L 11–2	Wainwright (7–4)	Verlander (7–3)		44,021	34–30
65	June 17	@ Cardinals	L 4–3	Wellemeyer (6–6)	Jackson (6–4)	Franklin (16)	39,699	34–31
66	June 18	@ Cardinals	W 6–3	Porcello (8–4)	Piñeiro (5–8)	Rodney (13)	41,323	35–31
67	June 19	Brewers	W 10–4 (7)	Miner (4–1)	Looper (5–4)		34,112	36–31
68	June 20	Brewers	W 9–5	Figaro (1–0)	Bush (3–4)		39,156	37–31
69	June 21	Brewers	W 3–2	Verlander (8–3)	Gallardo (7–4)	Rodney (14)	41,163	38–31
70	June 23	Cubs	W 5–4	Lyon (3–3)	Gregg (2–2)		38,046	39–31
71	June 24	Cubs	W 5–3	Miner (5–1)	Harden (4–4)	Rodney (15)	36,438	40–31
72	June 25	Cubs	W 6–5	Galarraga (4–7)	Lilly (7–5)	Rodney (16)	42,332	41–31
73	June 26	@ Astros	L 5–4	Sampson (4–0)	Zumaya (3–2)	Hawkins (10)	33,052	41–32
74	June 27	@ Astros	L 8–1	Paulino (2–4)	Figaro (1–1)		37,123	41–33
75	June 28	@ Astros	W 4–3	Seay (1–1)	Valderde (0–2)	Rodney (17)	34,041	42–33
76	June 29	@ Athletics	L 7–1	Anderson (4–7)	Porcello (8–5)		10,563	42–34
77	June 30	@ Athletics	W 5–3	Galarraga (5–7)	Gonzalez (0–2)		12,126	43–34

July (10–14)

#	Date	Opponent	Score	Win	Loss	Save	Attendance	Record
78	July 1	@ Athletics	L 5–1	Braden (6–7)	Verlander (8–4)		21,238	43–35
79	July 3	@ Twins	W 11–9 (16)	Dolsi (1–0)	Dickey (1–1)		33,368	44–35
80	July 4	@ Twins	L 4–3	Guerrier (4–0)	Lyon (3–4)	Nathan (22)	27,238	44–36
81	July 5	@ Twins	L 6–2	Blackburn (7–4)	Porcello (8–6)		33,274	44–37
82	July 6	Royals	L 4–3	Colón (1–0)	Rodney (0–2)	Soria (13)	32,134	44–38
83	July 7	Royals	W 8–5	Verlander (9–4)	Chen (0–3)	Rodney (18)	29,751	45–38
84	July 8	Royals	W 3–1	French (1–0)	Greinke (10–5)	Rodney (19)	29,104	46–38
85	July 10	Indians	W 5–1	Jackson (7–4)	Lee (5–8)	Rodney (20)	35,592	47–38
86	July 11	Indians	L 5–4	Pavano (8–7)	Galarraga (5–8)	Wood (12)	41,782	47–39
87	July 12	Indians	W 10–1	Verlander (10–4)	Ohka (0–3)		39,680	48–39
88	July 17	@ Yankees	L 5–3	Hughes (4–2)	Zumaya (3–3)	Rivera (24)	46,197	48–40
89	July 18	@ Yankees	L 2–1	Sabathia (9–6)	Verlander (10–5)	Rivera (25)	46,423	48–41
90	July 19	@ Yankees	L 2–1	Chamberlain (5–2)	Jackson (7–5)	Rivera (26)	46,937	48–42
91	July 21	Mariners	W 9–7	Porcello (9–6)	Olson (3–4)	Rodney (20)	32,906	49–42
92	July 22	Mariners	L 2–1	Hernández (11–3)	Seay (1–2)	Aardsma (23)	29,758	49–43
93	July 23	Mariners	L 2–1	Washburn (8–6)	French (1–1)	Aardsma (24)	32,177	49–44
94	July 24	White Sox	W 5–1	Verlander (11–5)	Contreras (4–9)		27,844	50–44
95	July 24	White Sox	W 4–3	Lyon (4–4)	Linebrink (2–5)	Rodney (21)	39,375	51–44
96	July 25	White Sox	W 4–3 (10)	Rodney (1–2)	Carrasco (3–1)		41,378	52–44
97	July 26	White Sox	L 5–1	Richard (4–3)	Porcello (9–7)		38,255	52–45
98	July 27	@ Rangers	L 5–2	Hunter (3–1)	Galarraga (5–9)	Wilson (11)	17,137	52–46
99	July 28	@ Rangers	L 7–3	Grilli (1–2)	French (1–2)		21,615	52–47
100	July 29	@ Rangers	W 13–5	Verlander (12–5)	Feldman (9–4)		33,235	53–47
101	July 31	@ Indians	L 6–5 (13)	Ohka (1–4)	Fien (0–1)		35,273	53–48

August (16–13)

#	Date	Opponent	Score	Win	Loss	Save	Attendance	Record
102	August 1	@ Indians	W 4–3 (12)	Seay (2–2)	Veras (4–2)	Miner (1)	31,353	54–48
103	August 2	@ Indians	L 11–1	Pavano (9–8)	Galarraga (5–10)		24,718	54–49
104	August 3	Orioles	W 6–5	Rodney (2–2)	Báez (4–5)		27,857	55–49
105	August 4	Orioles	L 8–2	Matusz (1–0)	Washburn (8–7)		29,295	55–50
106	August 5	Orioles	W 4–2	Jackson (8–5)	Guthrie (7–11)	Rodney (22)	28,978	56–50
107	August 6	Orioles	W 7–3	Porcello (10–7)	Hernandez (3–4)	Lyon (1)	31,165	57–50
108	August 7	Twins	W 10–8	Galarraga (6–10)	Swarzak (3–5)		36,444	58–50
109	August 8	Twins	L 11–0	Pavano (10–8)	Verlander (12–6)		39,685	58–51
110	August 9	Twins	W 8–7	Lyon (5–4)	Guerrier (5–1)	Rodney (23)	35,423	59–51
111	August 10	@ Red Sox	L 6–5	Ramírez (6–3)	Miner (5–2)	Papelbon (28)	37,960	59–52
112	August 11	@ Red Sox	L 7–5	Tazawa (1–1)	Lambert (0–1)		38,013	59–53
113	August 12	@ Red Sox	L 8–2	Beckett (14–4)	Miner (5–3)		38,124	59–54
114	August 13	@ Red Sox	W 2–0	Verlander (13–6)	Buchholz (1–3)	Rodney (24)	37,556	60–54
115	August 14	Royals	W 1–0	Lyon (5–4)	Colón (1–2)		34,799	61–54
116	August 15	Royals	W 10–3	Jackson (6–6)	Hochevar (9–5)		37,276	62–54
117	August 16	Royals	L 3–2 (10)	Soria (3–0)	Rodney (2–3)		32,888	62–55
118	August 18	Mariners	W 5–3	Seay (3–2)	Lowe (1–6)	Rodney (25)	33,710	63–55
119	August 19	Mariners	L 3–1	Snell (3–9)	Verlander (13–7)	Aardsma (28)	33,194	63–56
120	August 20	Mariners	W 7–6	Seay (4–2)	Aardsma (3–5)		31,167	64–56
121	August 21	@ Athletics	W 3–2	Jackson (10–5)	Gonzalez (4–4)	Rodney (26)	15,927	65–56
122	August 22	@ Athletics	L 3–2	Bailey (6–3)	Miner (5–4)		26,266	65–57
123	August 23	@ Athletics	L 9–4	Tomko (3–2)	Porcello (10–8)		17,690	65–58
124	August 24	@ Angels	W 10–7	Verlander (14–7)	Weaver (13–5)	Rodney (27)	38,421	66–58
125	August 25	@ Angels	W 5–3	Washburn (9–7)	Lackey (8–7)	Rodney (28)	42,970	67–58
126	August 26	@ Angels	L 4–2	Saunders (10–7)	Jackson (10–6)	Fuentes (36)	36,329	67–59
127	August 28	Rays	W 6–2	Porcello (11–8)	Garza (7–9)		35,030	68–59
128	August 29	Rays	L 3–1	Price (7–6)	Robertson (1–1)	Howell (16)	39,296	68–60
129	August 30	Rays	W 4–3	Verlander (15–7)	Balfour (5–3)	Rodney (29)	36,067	69–60
130	August 31	Rays	L 11–7	Shields (9–10)	Washburn (9–8)		26,533	69–61

September (16–12)

#	Date	Opponent	Score	Win	Loss	Save	Attendance	Record
131	September 1	Indians	W 8–5	Jackson (11–6)	Carrasco (0–1)	Rodney (30)	24,225	70–61
132	September 2	Indians	W 4–2	Porcello (12–8)	Laffey (7–4)	Rodney (31)	25,840	71–61
133	September 3	Indians	W 4–3 (10)	Miner (6–4)	Pérez (4–3)		28,267	72–61
134	September 4	@ Rays	W 4–3	Verlander (16–7)	Howell (7–5)	Rodney (32)	18,596	73–61
135	September 5	@ Rays	W 8–6	Seay (5–2)	Balfour (5–4)	Lyon (2)	36,973	74–61
136	September 6	@ Rays	W 5–3	Jackson (12–6)	Springer (0–3)	Lyon (3)	28,059	75–61
137	September 8	@ Royals	L 7–5	Yabuta (1–1)	Seay (5–3)	Soria (23)	12,032	75–62
138	September 9	@ Royals	L 5–1	Tejeda (2–1)	Verlander (16–8)	Soria (24)	10,584	75–63
139	September 10	@ Royals	L 7–4	Colón (2–3)	Miner (6–5)	Rosa (1)	12,029	75–64
140	September 11	Blue Jays	W 6–4	Tallet (7–9)	Robertson (1–2)	Frasor (9)	31,575	75–65
141	September 12	Blue Jays	L 8–6	League (3–5)	Rodney (2–4)	Frasor (10)	36,142	75–66
142	September 13	Blue Jays	W 7–2	Porcello (13–8)	Romero (12–8)		32,468	76–66
143	September 14	Blue Jays	W 6–5 (10)	Seay (6–3)	Wolfe (1–2)		24,375	77–66
144	September 15	Royals	L 11–1	Tejeda (3–1)	Washburn (9–9)		20,422	77–67
145	September 16	Royals	W 4–3	Miner (7–5)	DiNardo (0–1)	Rodney (33)	25,400	78–67
146	September 17	Royals	L 9–2	Greinke (14–8)	Jackson (12–7)		26,457	78–68
147	September 18	@ Twins	L 3–0	Duensing (4–1)	Porcello (13–9)	Nathan (42)	32,693	78–69
148	September 19	@ Twins	L 6–2	Crain (6–4)	Verlander (16–9)		43,338	78–70
149	September 20	@ Twins	W 6–2	Robertson (2–2)	Baker (13–9)		36,335	79–70
150	September 22	@ Indians	W 3–1	Jackson (13–7)	Laffey (7–7)	Rodney (34)	23,217	80–70
151	September 23	@ Indians	W 11–3	Porcello (14–9)	Masterson (4–9)		13,971	81–70
152	September 24	@ Indians	W 6–5	Verlander (17–9)	Carrasco (0–3)	Rodney (35)	23,516	82–70
153	September 25	@ White Sox	L 2–0	Peavy (8–6)	Bonine (0–2)	Thornton (2)	30,794	82–71
154	September 26	@ White Sox	W 12–5	Figaro (2–1)	García (2–4)		35,590	83–71
155	September 27	@ White Sox	L 8–4	Hudson (1–1)	Jackson (13–8)	Thornton (3)	33,685	83–72
	September 28	Twins	Postponed (rain) – rescheduled for September 29					
156	September 29	Twins	L 3–2 (10)	Rauch (6–3)	Lyon (6–5)	Nathan (45)	35,243	83–73
157	September 29	Twins	W 6–5	Verlander (18–9)	Duensing (5–2)	Rodney (36)	30,240	84–73
158	September 30	Twins	W 7–2	Bonine (1–1)	Pavano (13–12)		34,775	85–73

October (1–4)

#	Date	Opponent	Score	Win	Loss	Save	Attendance	Record
159	October 1	Twins	L 8–3	Baker (15–9)	Robertson (2–3)		40,533	85–74
160	October 2	White Sox	L 8–0	Peavy (9–6)	Jackson (13–9)		34,726	85–75
161	October 3	White Sox	L 5–1	García (3–4)	Figaro (2–2)		35,184	85–76
162	October 4	White Sox	W 5–3	Verlander (19–9)	Danks (13–11)	Rodney (37)	35,806	86–76
163	October 6	@ Twins	L 6–5 (12)	Keppel (1–1)	Rodney (2–5)		54,088	86–77

== Player stats ==
Through October 6, 2009

=== Batting ===
Note: G = Games played; AB = At bats; H = Hits; Avg. = Batting average; HR = Home runs; RBI = Runs batted in

Player	G	AB	H	Avg.	HR	RBI
Wilkin Ramírez	15	11	4	.364	1	3
Miguel Cabrera	160	611	198	.324	34	103
Magglio Ordóñez	131	465	144	.310	9	50
Alex Avila	29	61	17	.279	5	14
Ryan Raburn	113	261	76	.291	16	45
Plácido Polanco	153	618	176	.285	10	72
Ramón Santiago	93	262	70	.267	7	35
Marcus Thames	87	258	65	.252	13	36
Curtis Granderson	160	631	157	.249	30	71
Adam Everett	118	345	82	.238	3	44
Josh Anderson *	74	165	40	.242	0	16
Clete Thomas	102	275	66	.240	7	39
Don Kelly	31	56	14	.250	0	3
Carlos Guillén	81	277	67	.242	11	41
Brandon Inge	161	562	129	.230	27	84
Gerald Laird	135	413	93	.225	4	33
Jeff Larish *	32	74	16	.216	4	7
Aubrey Huff *	40	106	20	.189	2	13
Dusty Ryan	12	26	4	.154	0	4
Dane Sardinha *	12	31	3	.097	0	3
Brent Dlugach	4	3	0	.000	0	0
Matt Treanor *	4	13	0	.000	0	0
Pitcher totals	163	16	2	.125	0	2
Team totals	163	5540	1443	.260	183	718

Individual pitchers batting statistics not included.

=== Starting and other pitchers ===
Note: G = Games pitched; IP = Innings pitched; W = Wins; L = Losses; ERA = Earned run average; SO = Strikeouts

Player	G	IP	W	L	ERA	SO
Justin Verlander	35	240	19	9	3.45	269
Edwin Jackson	33	214	13	9	3.62	161
Lucas French *	7	29 1/3	1	2	3.38	19
Rick Porcello	31	170 2/3	14	9	3.96	89
Eddie Bonine	10	34 1/3	1	1	4.40	19
Nate Robertson	28	49 2/3	2	3	5.44	35
Armando Galarraga	29	143 1/3	6	10	5.64	95
Alfredo Figaro	5	17	2	2	6.35	16
Jarrod Washburn	8	43	1	3	7.33	21
Dontrelle Willis *	7	33 2/3	1	4	7.49	17
Jeremy Bonderman	8	10 1/3	0	1	8.71	5

=== Relief pitchers ===
Note: G = Games pitched; W = Wins; L = Losses; SV = Saves; HLD = Holds; ERA = Earned run average; SO = Strikeouts

Player	G	IP	W	L	SV	HLD	ERA	SO
Freddy Dolsi *	6	10 2/3	1	0	0	0	1.69	3
Brandon Lyon	57	78 2/3	6	4	3	15	2.87	51
Fu-Te Ni	29	31	0	0	0	3	2.93	19
Bobby Seay	63	48 2/3	6	3	0	28	3.61	37
Fernando Rodney	64	75 2/3	2	4	37	0	3.88	59
Ryan Perry	47	61 2/3	0	1	0	6	4.00	51
Zach Miner	45	92 1/3	7	5	1	8	4.52	56
Joel Zumaya *	29	31	3	3	1	7	4.94	30
Juan Rincón *	7	10 1/3	1	0	0	0	5.23	10
Clay Rapada *	2	3 1/3	0	0	0	0	7.71	2
Casey Fien	6	11 1/3	0	1	0	0	9.82	6
Chris Lambert *	2	6 2/3	0	1	0	0	14.85	4
Team Pitching Totals	163	1447	86	77	42	67	4.29	1102

* No longer on active roster

== Farm system ==
Level	Team	League	Manager
AAA	Toledo Mud Hens	International League	Larry Parrish
AA	Erie SeaWolves	Eastern League	Tom Brookens
A	Lakeland Flying Tigers	Florida State League	Andy Barkett
A	West Michigan Whitecaps	Midwest League	Joe DePastino
A-Short Season	Oneonta Tigers	New York–Penn League	Howard Bushong
Rookie	GCL Tigers	Gulf Coast League	Basilio Cabrera

== See also ==
- 2009 in baseball
