= 2009 American League Central tie-breaker game =

2009 Major League Baseball tie-breaker game

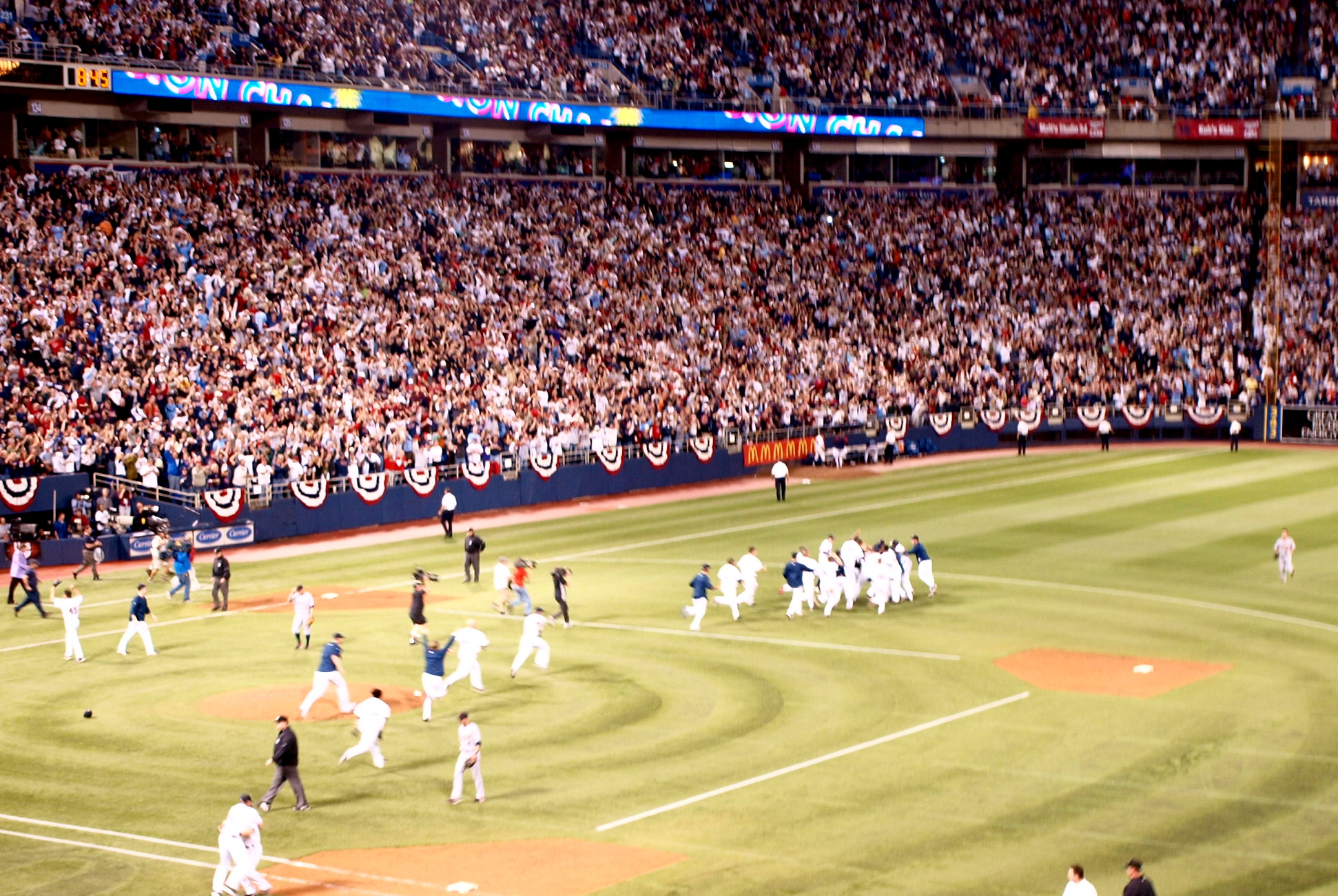
- The Twins celebrate after winning the game 6–5.
	1	2	3	4	5	6	7	8	9	10	11	12	R	H	E
Detroit Tigers	0	0	3	0	0	0	0	1	0	1	0	0	5	12	1
Minnesota Twins	0	0	1	0	0	1	2	0	0	1	0	1	6	12	0
- Date: October 6, 2009
- Venue: Hubert H. Humphrey Metrodome
- City: Minneapolis, Minnesota
- Umpires: HP: Randy Marsh; 1B: Dale Scott; 2B: Jerry Layne; 3B: Gary Cederstrom; LF: Fieldin Culbreth; RF: Bruce Dreckman
- Attendance: 54,088
- Television: TBS
- TV announcers: Chip Caray and Ron Darling
- Radio: ESPN; WXYT (DET); KSTP (MIN)
- Radio announcers: ESPN: Dan Shulman and Dave Campbell; WXYT: Dan Dickerson and Jim Price; KSTP: John Gordon and Dan Gladden

The 2009 American League Central tie-breaker game was a one-game extension to Major League Baseball's (MLB) 2009 regular season, played between the Detroit Tigers and Minnesota Twins to determine the champion of the American League's (AL) Central Division. It was played at the Hubert H. Humphrey Metrodome in Minneapolis, Minnesota, on October 6, 2009. The Twins won the game 6–5 in a thrilling 12-inning battle, and advanced to the 2009 AL Division Series where they were swept by the New York Yankees; the Tigers failed to qualify for the postseason.

A tie-breaker was necessary after both teams finished the season with identical win–loss records of 86–76. Due to a change in the tiebreaker rules prior to the 2009 season, the Twins were awarded home-field advantage by winning the regular season series 11–7 against the Tigers. It was the third tie-breaker played in MLB from 2007 to 2009. It was also the second consecutive tiebreaker for the AL Central title after 2008, when the Chicago White Sox defeated the Twins to win the division. The Twins became the only MLB team to contest tie-breaker games of any sort (divisional and/or wild card) in consecutive seasons. The tie-breaker counted as the 163rd regular season game played by both teams and all events in the game were added to regular season statistics. This was the Twins' final regular season game at the Metrodome as the team moved to Target Field for the 2010 season. The tie-breaker was later named the Best Regular-Season Game of the Decade by Sports Illustrated.

== Background ==
The Tigers led the AL Central for periods at the start of the season in April, ultimately tying for the lead on May 10 and taking the lead outright on May 16. The Tigers held at least a share of the divisional lead from then onwards, holding their largest lead of 7 games on September 6. Although the Tigers went 16–12 in September, their second-best month by winning percentage in 2009, they won just 1 of 4 games in October. The Twins went 16–11 and 4–0, respectively, over this same stretch to tie the Tigers for the divisional lead after the 162-game regular season. More broadly, the Tigers were 48–39 over the first half of the season while the Twins were 45–44 but the Twins came back in the second half going 41–32 leading up to the tie-breaker while the Tigers went 38–37 over the same span. The Twins won 11 of the two teams' 18 match-ups that season prior to the tie-breaker.

This late-season competition for the AL Central title included a four-game series between the two teams from September 29 to October 1. The series, played at the Tigers' home field Comerica Park, started with a day-night doubleheader caused by a rainout the night before when the series was scheduled to start. The final game of the series featured moments of contention between the two teams. In the third inning, Nate Robertson hit Denard Span. Minnesota starter Scott Baker hit Marcus Thames with a pitch the next inning. Thames responded by sliding hard into second base to break up a potential double play that inning. Twins' reliever Jose Mijares then threw behind the Tigers' Adam Everett in the eighth inning. Umpire Angel Hernandez warned Mijares and the Tigers bench, Tigers' manager Jim Leyland argued with Hernandez, and he was ejected. Despite the warning Minnesota's Delmon Young was hit in the knee with the first pitch in the ninth inning by Jeremy Bonderman. Bonderman was immediately ejected as was Tigers' catcher Gerald Laird who argued with Hernandez and the benches cleared, though there was no brawl. Bonderman was suspended for three games, and Tigers' hitting coach Lloyd McClendon—who had been acting as manager following Leyland's ejection—was suspended for a game. McClendon, Leyland, and Laird were all fined.

Ultimately, the four-game series was split with two wins for each team, and the Tigers maintained a two-game lead with three games remaining for each club. The Tigers lost two of their next three games to the Chicago White Sox, whereas the Twins swept the Kansas City Royals in a three-game series leaving both teams tied with an 86–76 record. A tiebreaker game would decide the winner of the Central Division while the loser would be eliminated from playoff contention. Prior to the 2009 season, home field advantage in a tiebreaker game was decided by a series of coin tosses held towards the end of the regular season that would decide the home teams of all possible tiebreakers. A rule change following the 2008 season altered this process, leaving the site determined on a series of performance-based criteria beginning with the head-to-head record between the two teams that were tied. Therefore, the Twins took home-field advantage in this game, by virtue of winning the season series against the Tigers 11–7. The game was the third MLB tie-breaker in three years, a record number for the majors.

While October 5 had been the original scheduled date for a potential tiebreaker game, a scheduling conflict with the Minnesota Vikings, who were co-tenants of the Metrodome with the Twins, resulted in the tiebreaker game being moved a day later to October 6.

== Game summary ==
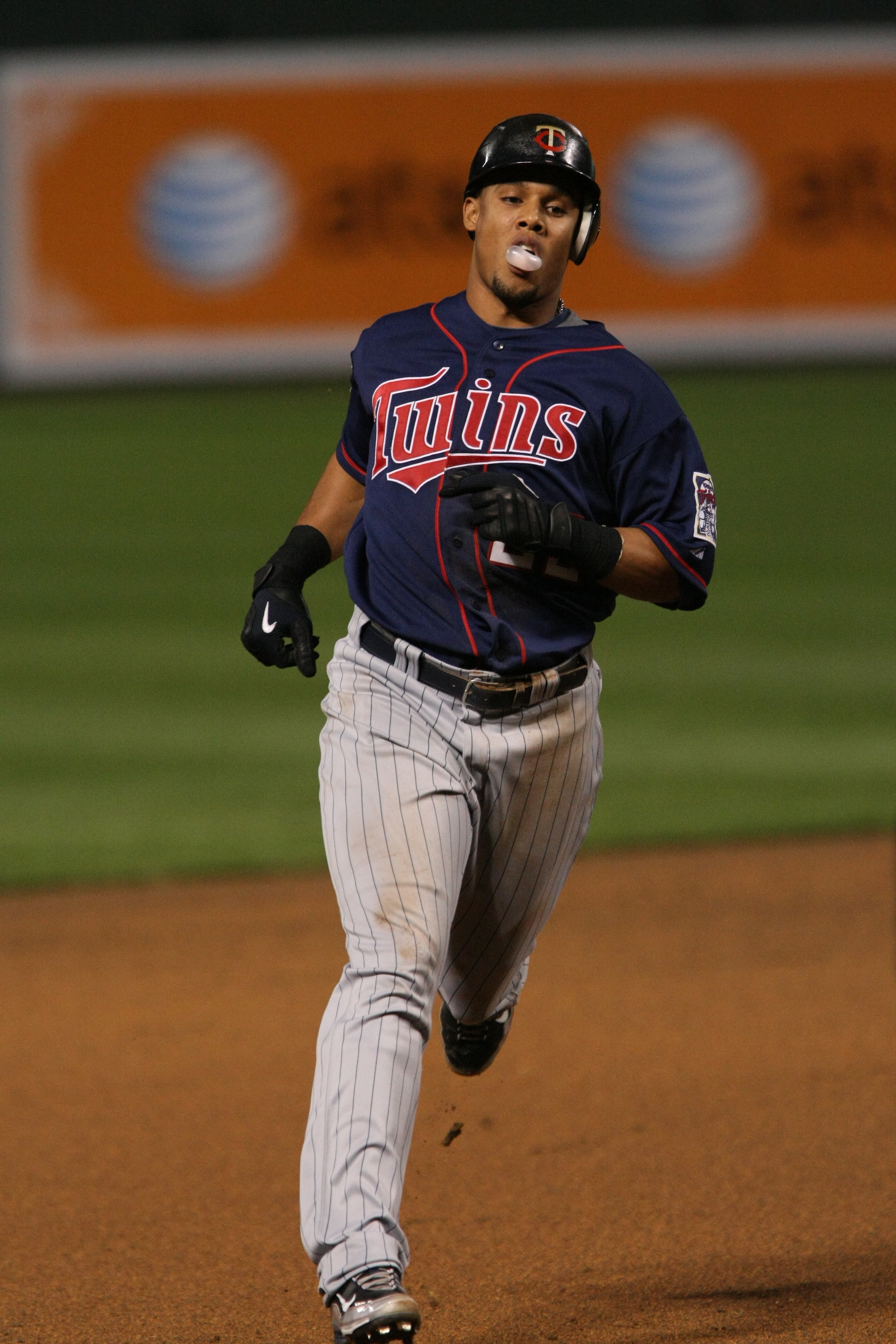
Carlos Gómez, pictured here in the regular season, scored the winning run in the 12th inning.

October 6, 2009 4:08 pm (CDT) at Hubert H. Humphrey Metrodome in Minneapolis, Minnesota
Team	1	2	3	4	5	6	7	8	9	10	11	12	R	H	E
Detroit	0	0	3	0	0	0	0	1	0	1	0	0	5	12	1
Minnesota	0	0	1	0	0	1	2	0	0	1	0	1	6	12	0
WP: Bob Keppel (1–1) LP: Fernando Rodney (2–5); Home runs: DET: Miguel Cabrera (34), Magglio Ordóñez (9); MIN: Jason Kubel (28), Orlando Cabrera (9); Attendance: 54,088

The game was scoreless through the first two innings. Detroit took a three-run lead in the third inning which started when Curtis Granderson walked, advanced on a ground out, and scored on a single by Magglio Ordóñez to center field. Ordóñez was then brought home via a two-run home run by Tigers' first baseman Miguel Cabrera. The Twins responded in the bottom of the inning, with Matt Tolbert singling to lead off the inning, advancing to second base on a single by Denard Span, and then moving to third on a flyball out. Tigers' starter Rick Porcello attempted a pickoff throw to first which hit the baserunner Span and went past the first baseman Cabrera. Span was out but Tolbert was able to score on Porcello's throwing error.

The score remained 3–1 until the bottom of the sixth inning. Porcello got the first two batters of the inning out but then allowed a home run to Jason Kubel to bring the game within one run. Porcello then walked the next batter, Michael Cuddyer, and was relieved by Zach Miner. The Twins loaded the bases against Miner, but did not score again in the inning. Scott Baker, the Twins' starter, walked the first batter of the seventh and was relieved by Jon Rauch though no runs scored. The Twins took a 4–3 lead in the bottom of the seventh with a leadoff single by Nick Punto and a two-run home run by Orlando Cabrera. The Tigers responded, tying the game at 4 with a home run by Ordóñez in the top of the eighth off of Matt Guerrier. Guerrier allowed another two walks in the inning and was relieved by closer Joe Nathan who escaped the inning with no further scoring.

Nathan remained in the game, holding the Tigers scoreless in the ninth, while Tigers' closer Fernando Rodney did the same to Minnesota to force extra innings. Jesse Crain replaced Nathan in the top of the tenth and hit Aubrey Huff who was pinch hitting for Wilkin Ramirez. Don Kelly then pinch ran for Huff, and scored on a double by Brandon Inge to give the Tigers a 5–4 lead. The Tigers inserted Clete Thomas for Ordóñez in right field as a defensive replacement in the bottom of the tenth. However the Twins retied the game at 5–5 as Cuddyer led off the inning with a triple and, following a Delmon Young groundout and a walk to Brendan Harris, scored on a single by Tolbert. Alexi Casilla pinch-ran for Harris and advanced to third on Tolbert's single. Nick Punto then hit a fly ball to left-fielder Ryan Raburn. Casilla attempted to score on the play, but inadvertently inched off the base before the ball was caught, and had to return to the base before breaking for home. Catcher Gerald Laird successfully tagged out Casilla to complete the inning-ending double play.

Both teams were held scoreless in the 11th. The Tigers threatened to score in the top of the 12th, with a walk by Cabrera and a single by Kelly with one out. Twins pitcher Bobby Keppel then intentionally walked Raburn to load the bases, hoping he could induce a double play. Then, Keppel threw a fastball close to batter Brandon Inge with his first pitch. Inge believed he was hit by the ball and should advance to first, which would force a go-ahead run to score with the bases loaded, but home plate umpire Randy Marsh ruled the pitch did not hit Inge and allowed the at-bat to continue. Tigers' manager Jim Leyland would say later that "the replay kind of confirms that it did hit him," but Marsh maintained that replays were "inconclusive." Inge ultimately grounded into a force out at home and Laird would strikeout to close the top of the inning with no scoring. Carlos Gómez led off the bottom of the 12th with a single for the Twins and advanced to second on a ground-out. With first base open, the Tigers intentionally walked Delmon Young to bring up Casilla. Casilla atoned for his earlier base-running blunder by hitting a ground ball through the right side of the infield. The base hit allowed the speedy Gomez to score from second without a play, thus giving the Twins a 6–5 walk-off victory.

== Aftermath ==
The tie-breaker win clinched the American League Central for the Twins and earned them a spot in the ALDS, in which they were swept by the New York Yankees in three games. The Tigers became the first team in MLB history to have a three-game division lead with four games remaining and lose the division.

MLB tie-breaker games (Game 163) counted as regular season games and this game affected certain statistical races for the 2009 season. For example, Jason Beck of MLB.com noted that if the umpire agreed with Brandon Inge on the contentious 12th inning call Inge would have tied for the most HBPs in the American League. Twins' catcher Joe Mauer won the 2009 American League batting title, and his final batting average for the season moved from .364 to .365 in the game.

The game was later chosen by Sports Illustrated as the Best Regular-Season Game of the Decade.
