= Dusty Ryan =

American baseball player (born 1984)

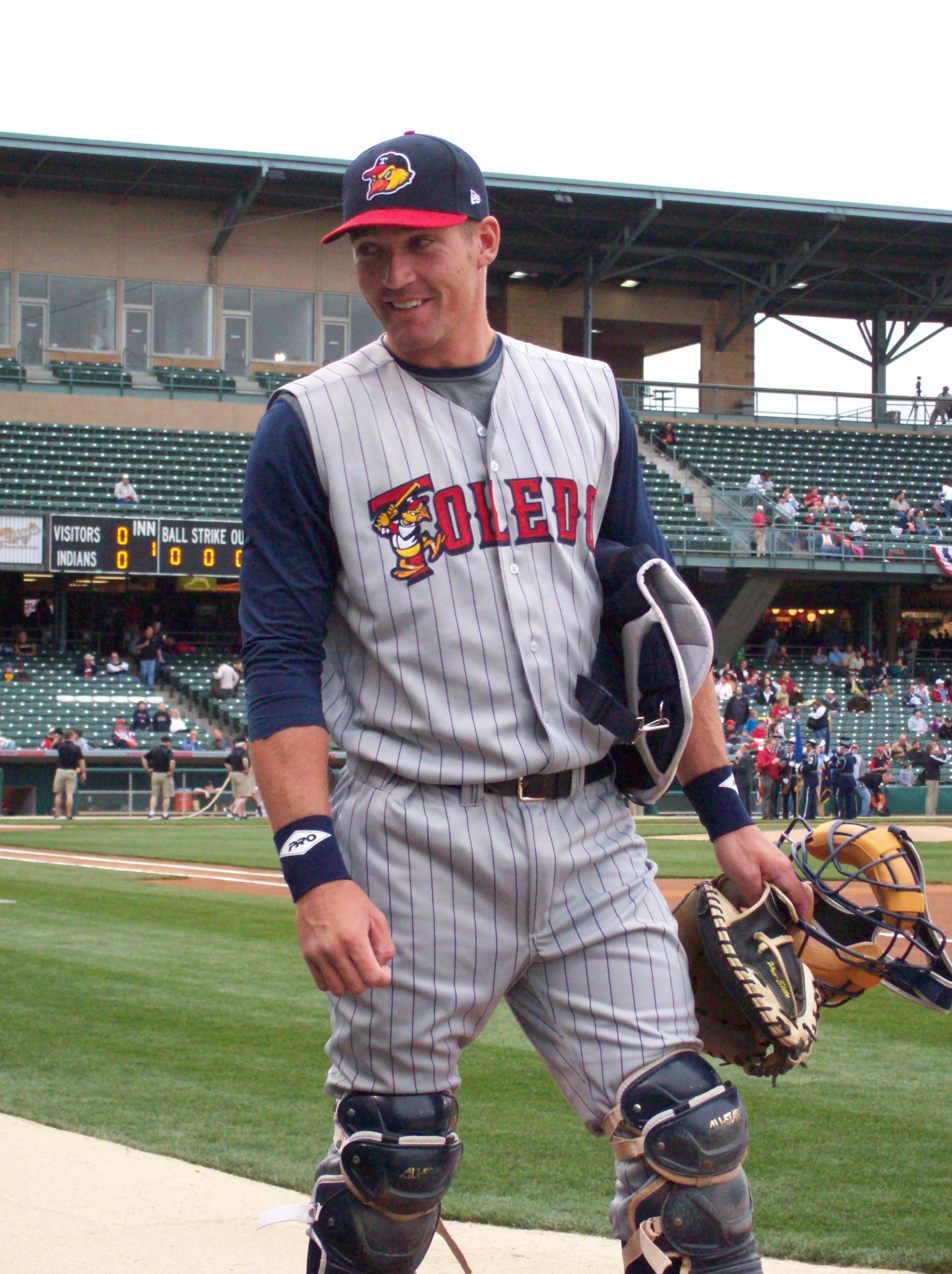
- Ryan with the Toledo Mud Hens
- Catcher
- Born: September 2, 1984 (age 41); Merced, California, U.S.
- Batted: Right Threw: Right

MLB debut
- September 4, 2008, for the Detroit Tigers

Last MLB appearance
- September 15, 2009, for the Detroit Tigers

MLB statistics
- Batting average: .257
- Home runs: 2
- Runs batted in: 11
- Stats at Baseball Reference

Teams
- Detroit Tigers (2008–2009)

Dusty Mitchell Ryan (born September 2, 1984) is an American former professional baseball player. A catcher, Ryan played in Major League Baseball for the Detroit Tigers.

Ryan's first major league hit was a home run. He is 6'4" tall and weighs 220 pounds.

On December 21, 2009, Ryan was traded from the Detroit Tigers to the San Diego Padres for a player to be named later or cash considerations.

Ryan was called up to the Padres on May 31, 2010. On November 6, 2010 Ryan signed a minor league deal with the New York Mets with an invitation to Major League spring training.

In May 2012, Ryan was working as a laborer for facilities management at the University of California, Merced campus.

Dusty works as a heavy equipment operator for Merced Irrigation District.
