= Bob Keppel =

American baseball player (born 1982)

Bobby Keppel
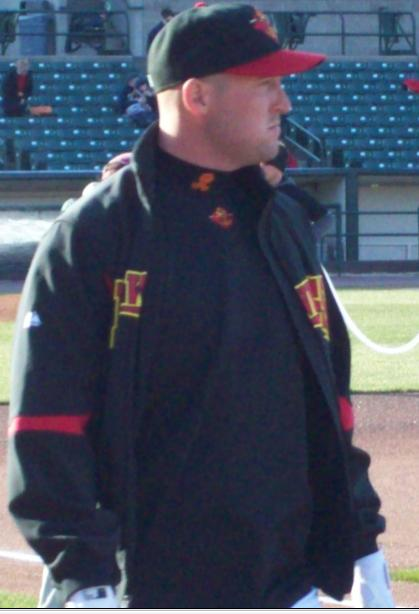
- Keppel with the Rochester Red Wings
- Pitcher
- Born: June 11, 1982 (age 44); St. Louis, Missouri, U.S.
- Batted: Right Threw: Right

MLB debut
- May 25, 2006, for the Kansas City Royals

Last appearance
- October 6, 2009, for the Minnesota Twins

MLB statistics
- Win–loss record: 1–5
- Earned run average: 5.36
- Strikeouts: 53

NPB statistics
- Win–loss record: 28–20
- Earned run average: 3.67
- Strikeouts: 169
- Stats at Baseball Reference

Teams
- Kansas City Royals (2006); Colorado Rockies (2007); Minnesota Twins (2009); Hokkaido Nippon Ham Fighters (2010–2013)

Robert Griffin "Bobby" Keppel (born June 11, 1982) is an American former professional baseball pitcher. He attended De Smet Jesuit High School in Creve Coeur, Missouri and while playing in the minor leagues attended the University of Notre Dame.

== Career ==
=== MLB career ===
Keppel was selected by the New York Mets in the first round of the 2000 draft (36th overall), with the compensation pick the Mets gained from the loss of free agent John Olerud. Keppel spent parts of six seasons in the team's farm system before signing a minor league contract with the Kansas City Royals. Keppel made his major league debut on May 25, 2006, eventually starting six games for the club. In 2007, he played in the Colorado Rockies' system. After starting the year 0–4, Keppel was sent to Colorado's Triple-A affiliate, the Colorado Springs Sky Sox, upon clearing waivers.

In 2008, he played for the Florida Marlins' Triple-A affiliate, the Albuquerque Isotopes and became a free agent at the end of the season. In December 2008, he signed a minor league contract with the Minnesota Twins. Keppel was recalled by the Twins on June 22, 2009. On October 6, 2009, Keppel was the winning pitcher in the 2009 American League Central tie-breaker game that sent the Twins into the American League Division Series. On January 4, 2010, Keppel was released by Minnesota.

=== Hokkaido Nippon-Ham Fighters ===
On January 6, 2010, Keppel agreed to a contract with the Hokkaido Nippon-Ham Fighters in the Pacific League of Nippon Professional Baseball.

=== Return to the MLB ===
Keppel signed a minor league deal with the Cincinnati Reds on January 3, 2014. He elected free agency on November 7, 2015 and has not played professionally since.
