= Matt Joyce (baseball) =

American baseball player (born 1984)

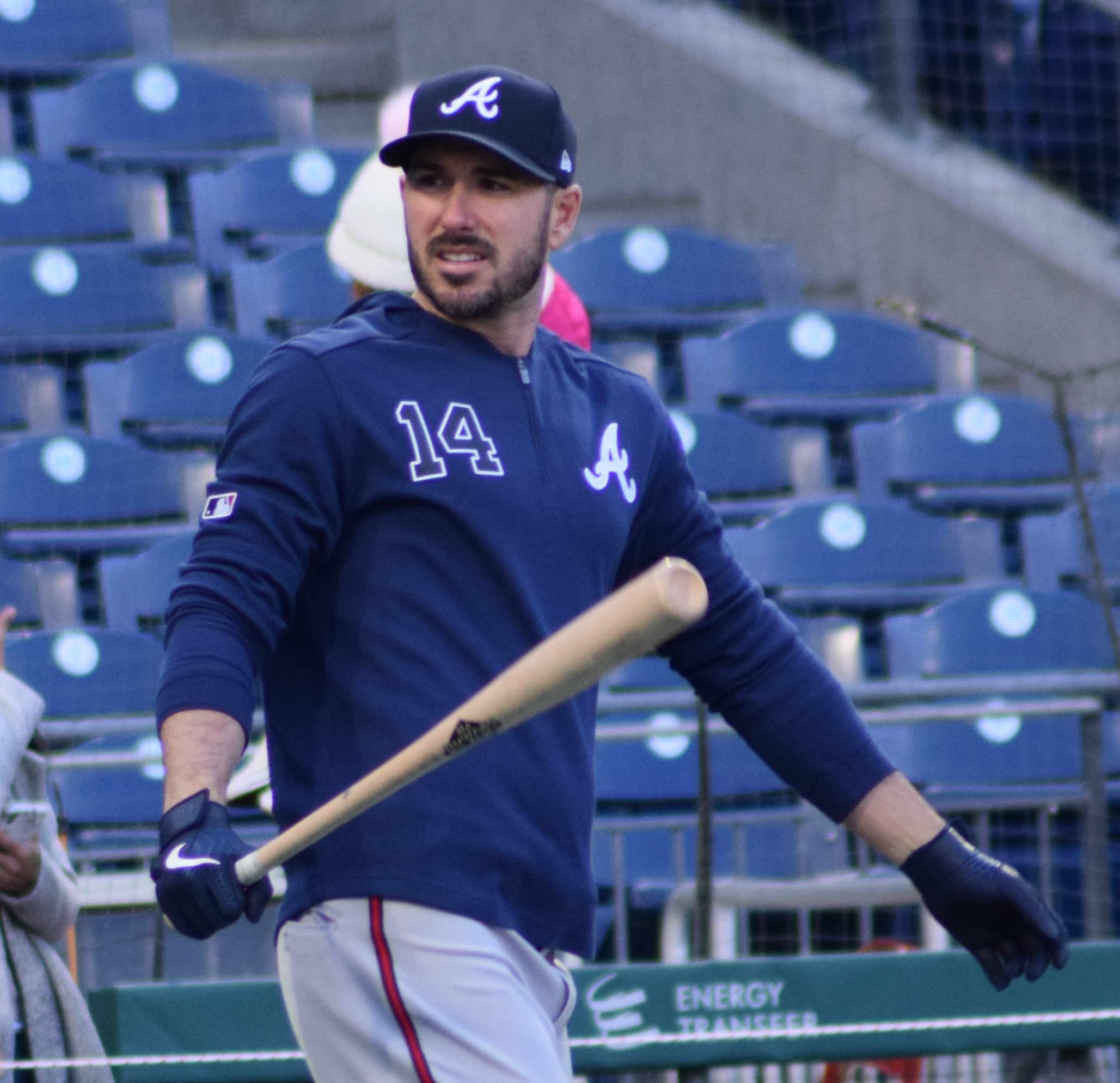
- Joyce with the Atlanta Braves in 2019
- Outfielder
- Born: August 3, 1984 (age 42); Tampa, Florida, U.S.
- Batted: Left Threw: Right

MLB debut
- May 5, 2008, for the Detroit Tigers

Last MLB appearance
- September 23, 2021, for the Philadelphia Phillies

MLB statistics
- Batting average: .242
- Home runs: 149
- Runs batted in: 503
- Stats at Baseball Reference

Teams
- Detroit Tigers (2008); Tampa Bay Rays (2009–2014); Los Angeles Angels of Anaheim (2015); Pittsburgh Pirates (2016); Oakland Athletics (2017–2018); Atlanta Braves (2019); Miami Marlins (2020); Philadelphia Phillies (2021)

Career highlights and awards
- All-Star (2011)

Matthew Ryan Joyce (born August 3, 1984) is an American former professional baseball outfielder, who played 14 seasons in Major League Baseball (MLB). Between 2008 and 2021, he played for eight MLB teams, most notably the Tampa Bay Rays, with whom he was named an MLB All-Star in 2011.

Raised by a single father in Tampa, Florida, Joyce frequently attended Rays games at Tropicana Field as a child. The Detroit Tigers attended an exhibition game that Joyce played with Florida Southern College and selected him in the 12th round of the 2005 MLB draft. Joyce debuted with the Tigers in 2008 and was traded to the Rays the following season. After five years in St. Petersburg, Florida, Joyce was traded to the Los Angeles Angels, where his performance suffered after a 2015 concussion.

After stints with the Pittsburgh Pirates, Oakland Athletics, and Atlanta Braves, as well as minor-league appearances for the Cleveland Indians and San Francisco Giants, Joyce signed a one-year deal with the Miami Marlins in 2020. There, he helped Miami reach their first Major League Baseball postseason appearance since 2003. Joyce retired from professional baseball after a stint with the Philadelphia Phillies in 2021, becoming a sports analyst for the Rays.

== Early life ==
Matthew Ryan Joyce was born in Tampa, Florida to Matthew Ryan Joyce Sr. and Vallie Klein. When Matt Jr. and his sister Danielle were youngsters, their mother, Vallie, who was dealing with substance abuse problems, left the children's father and took the rest of the family to New Jersey. Matt Sr. obtained a court order to reclaim his children, and raised Matt and Danielle as a single father, with the help of Vallie's mother, Patricia Klein. Joyce's father encouraged his son to learn baseball, helping with backyard batting practice and giving his son the nickname "Slugger" at the age of 10.

A childhood fan of the Tampa Bay Devil Rays of Major League Baseball (MLB), Joyce frequently attended home games at Tropicana Field. His favorite Ray was Fred McGriff, while his overall favorite baseball player was Ken Griffey Jr. Joyce's baseball career began with the North Brandon Little League in Brandon, Florida. He went on to attend Armwood High School in Seffner, Florida, where he described his athletic performance as not "too ridiculous as far as being that far above everybody." Joyce was the second Armwood baseball player to play in MLB, following left-handed pitcher Sterling Hitchcock, and Armwood retired his No. 24 jersey in February 2009.

== College career ==
Although Joyce received offers to play college baseball for the University of Tampa and the University of South Florida, he chose to attend Florida Southern College, who offered him an opportunity to begin playing as a freshman. As a sophomore in 2005, Joyce earned All-Sunshine State Conference honors and helped lead Florida Southern to their ninth NCAA Division II title.

The Detroit Tigers took notice of Joyce when they played an exhibition game against Florida Southern during spring training in 2005. That year, the Tigers selected Joyce in the 12th round of the 2005 MLB draft, and he signed with the team shortly afterwards. In three seasons with Florida Southern, Joyce hit 22 home runs and had 121 runs batted in (RBIs) in 170 games. Statistically, his best season was as a freshman in 2003, when he batted .329 with eight home runs, 44 RBIs, and 13 stolen bases. Florida Southern retired Joyce's No. 24 jersey in January 2018.

== Minor league career ==
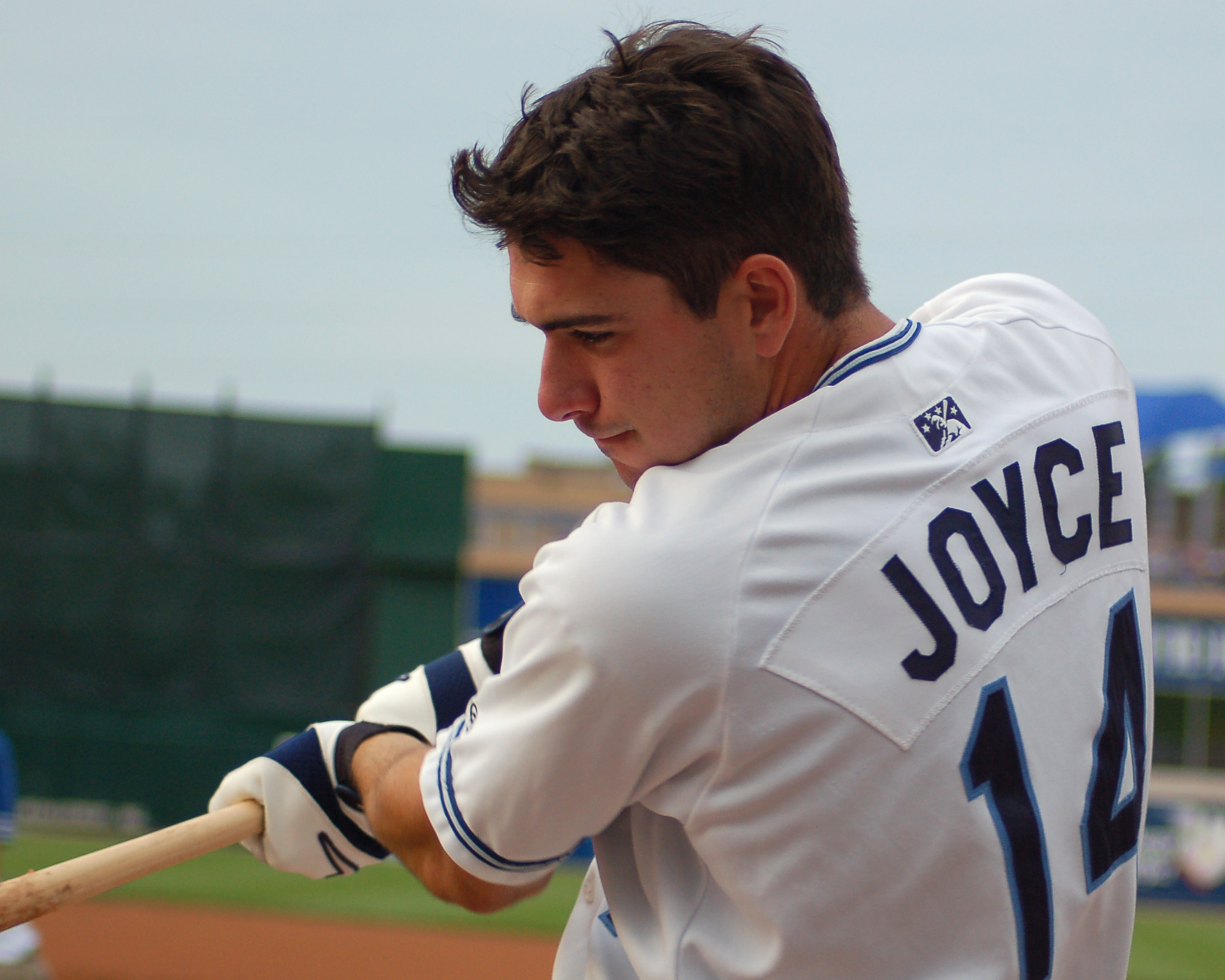
Joyce with the West Michigan Whitecaps in 2006

After being drafted in the 12th round of the 2005 MLB draft by the Detroit Tigers, Joyce spent the 2005 season with the Class A Short Season Oneonta Tigers of the New York–Penn League. There, he lived at a dormitory at Hartwick College, in the same hall as Burke Badenhop and Will Rhymes, all of whom would remain teammates as they moved through the Tigers' farm system. He played 65 games with Oneonta that season, batting .332 and recording four home runs and 46 RBIs in 247 at bats.

The following year, Joyce was promoted to the Class A West Michigan Whitecaps. He struggled in the jump to Class A; by mid-May, his batting average had fallen under .200, and he had suffered an injury to his quadriceps. Manager Matt Walbeck told Joyce to focus on changing his mindset as he approached the plate rather than working on his physical ability, and Joyce credits this mental approach to his improvement over the course of the season. He finished 2006 with a .258 average and 11 home runs, and led the team with 86 RBIs. The Whitecaps went on to win the Midwest League championship. In 2013, fans voted Joyce onto the Whitecaps All-Time Team, and in 2019, he was inducted into the Whitecaps Hall of Fame.

Joyce was promoted to the Double A Erie SeaWolves in 2007, and once again suffered an early-season slump. By May 19, his batting average had sunk to .168. He had recovered by the end of the season, finishing with a .257 average, 17 home runs, and 70 RBIs in 456 at bats and 130 games. Joyce, along with fellow outfielder Clete Thomas, was considered a likely future major leaguer. Commenting on the two, Tigers general manager Dave Dombrowski remarked that, "We think they're both prospects... We're not counting on them for this year, but they've got a chance to play at the Triple-A level (this season), depending on how they do this spring."

== Major league career ==
=== Detroit Tigers (2008) ===
Joyce began the 2008 season with the Triple A Toledo Mud Hens, with whom he hit .299 with five home runs and 21 RBIs in the team's first 28 games. After outfielder Jacque Jones was designated for assignment in early May, Joyce was called up to the Tigers in his stead. He made his major league debut on May 5, 2008, starting in right field for a 6–3 loss to the Boston Red Sox. His first major league home run followed shortly after, in a 5–2 loss to the New York Yankees on May 10. Joyce told reporters that he initially did not think he had hit a home run, as he saw Yankees outfielder Bobby Abreu running for the ball, but "[t]hen I heard the crowd start cheering, so I knew it had gone out."

After a strong first impression, Joyce began to struggle with hitting against curveballs and changeups. Joyce believed that he was putting too much effort into impressing the major league coaches. He was optioned back to Toledo at the end of May to make room for outfielder Marcus Thames. He returned to the Tigers on June 29 when Magglio Ordóñez was placed on the disabled list with a pulled oblique, remaining in the lineup even after Ordóñez returned. Joyce was named the American League (AL) Player of the Week on July 19. He was the first rookie position player for the Tigers to win the award since Tony Clark in 1996. In his rookie season, Joyce batted .252 in 92 games with the Tigers and .270 in 56 games with the Mud Hens.

During the offseason, Joyce played for the Águilas de Mexicali of the Mexican Pacific League. He batted .295 in 35 games with Mexicali, striking out less against curveballs.

=== Tampa Bay Rays (2009–2014) ===
On December 10, 2008, the Tigers traded Joyce to the Tampa Bay Rays (Note: The Tampa Bay Devil Rays rebranded as the Rays following the 2007 season, at the behest of new shareholder Stuart Sternberg.) in exchange for pitcher Edwin Jackson. Although Joyce missed time in spring training due to tendinitis in his leg, he was named to the Rays' Opening Day roster after B. J. Upton sustained a shoulder injury. On April 9, Joyce hit his first major league home run, a solo shot off of Daisuke Matsuzaka in the second inning of a 4–3 victory over the Boston Red Sox. When Upton returned from the disabled list on April 13, Joyce was optioned to the Triple-A Durham Bulls. Joyce played only three games with the Rays in his first major-league call-up, and his only hit in 10 at bats was the home run against Matsuzaka. In the minor leagues, Joyce helped the Bulls capture the Triple-A National Championship in a 5–4 victory over the Memphis Redbirds. He batted .273 in Triple-A, with 16 home runs and 66 RBIs in 111 games.

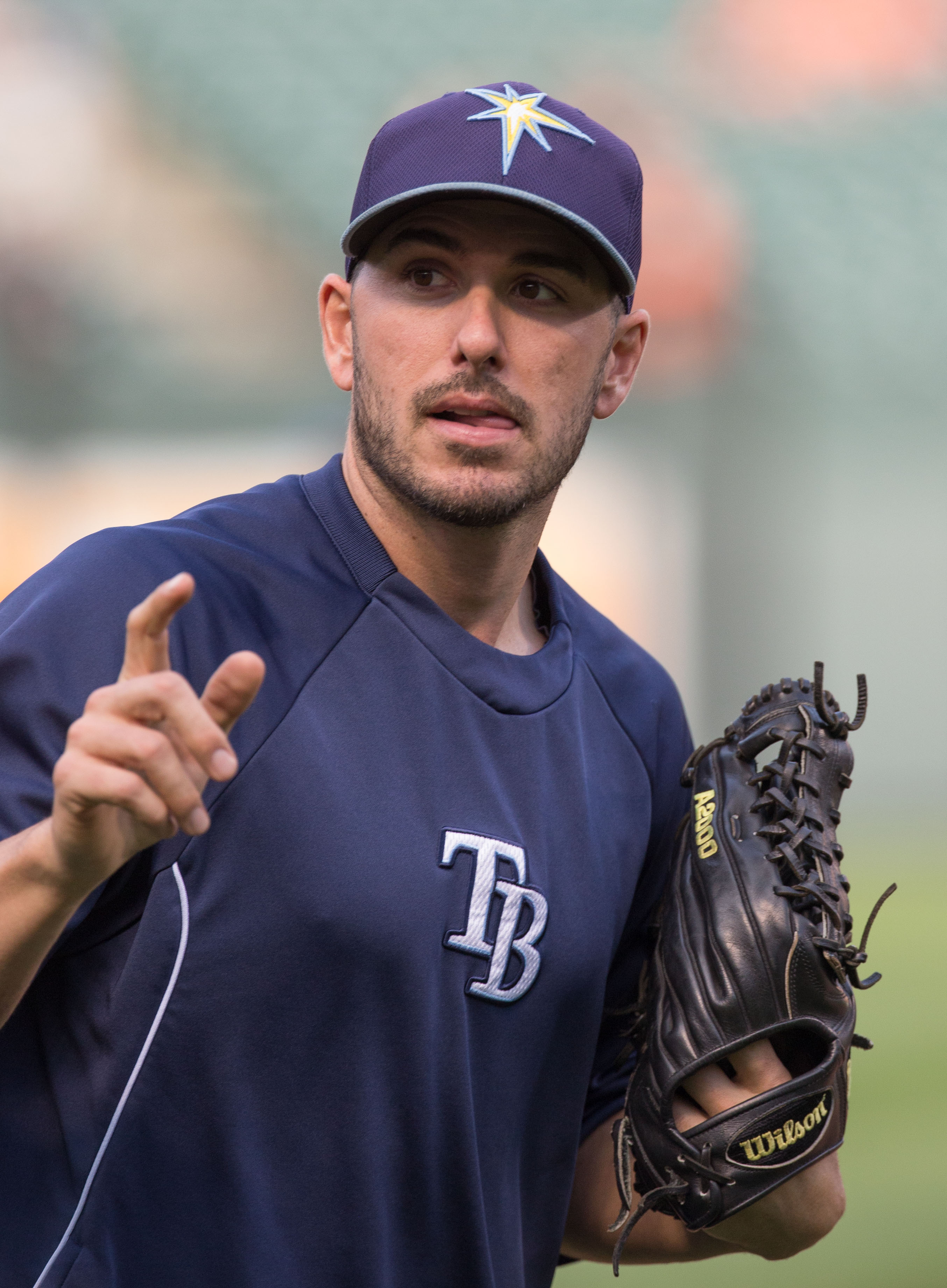
Joyce with the Tampa Bay Rays

Joyce missed the first half of the Ray's 2010 season after injuring his elbow during spring training. He returned to the team on June 25, and the Rays optioned catcher Dioner Navarro to make room in the lineup. In his first game upon returning, Edwin Jackson, for whom Joyce had been traded, pitched a no-hitter against the Rays. Later that season, on July 27, Joyce hit a grand slam in the sixth inning of Matt Garza's no-hitter against the Tigers. His home run was also the first hit of the game, against Detroit starting pitcher Max Scherzer. It was the second grand slam of his career, following an eighth-inning blast against the Minnesota Twins on July 3. He batted .241 for the season, with 10 runs and 40 RBIs in 216 at bats. Joyce also appeared in the 2010 American League Division Series (ALDS), against the Texas Rangers. His pop fly in Game 4 allowed Carlos Peña to score, brought the Rays back from a 2–1 series deficit, and forced a deciding Game 5. The Rangers went on to take the series, breaking a 39-year postseason drought. In nine postseason at bats, Joyce hit .222, with two hits and one stolen base.

After a lukewarm spring training performance, Joyce found his stride in 2011, leading the league with a .370 batting average by June 1. He received his first All-Star Game selection that season, alongside fellow Rays James Shields and David Price. He cooled a bit after the All-Star break, finishing the season with a .277 average, 19 home runs, and 75 RBIs. The Rays spent the final part of a season deadlocked with the Red Sox in the Wild Card race. On the final day of the regular season, a three-run home run from Joyce helped the Rays clinch a Wild Card berth, leading to a series against the Yankees. The Rays once again lost to the Rangers at the 2011 ALDS in a 3–1 series. Joyce appeared in all four games, where he batted .200 and scored one home run and four RBIs. Rays manager Andrew Friedman quickly signed Joyce to a one-year, $499,500 contract over the offseason.

Joyce hit his third career grand slam on May 19, 2012, in the third inning of a 5–2 game against the Atlanta Braves. In June, Joyce was placed on the 15-day disabled list with an oblique strain, with recent acquisition Ben Zobrist taking his place in the outfield. Joyce's injury, combined with an extended absence from Evan Longoria, caused a downturn in the Rays' season. By the time that Joyce returned, the Rays had lost 19 of their last 30 contests and had sacrificed their lead in the AL East to the Yankees. Joyce missed 23 games before returning on July 17, and Rhymes was optioned to Durham to make room on the roster. Joyce batted .241 for the season, with 17 home runs and 59 RBIs in 124 games.

The Rays avoided arbitration with Joyce going into the 2013 season, agreeing to a one-year, $2.45 million contract. In the second game of the season, Joyce recorded his first walk-off home run against Tommy Hunter of the Baltimore Orioles, winning the game 8–7. The following month, he hit a two-RBI double in the ninth inning of a game against the same team, helping the Rays win 10–6, and breaking the Orioles' 109-game winning streak when leading after seven innings. Overall, Friedman described Joyce's 2013 performance as "up-and-down ... where there were a couple hot months and a couple months where he struggled more." He hit .235 with 18 home runs and 47 RBIs in 481 plate appearances. Going into the 2013 ALDS against the Red Sox, Joyce was in an offensive slump, hitting .089 in the final 21 games of the regular season. Joyce continued his slump into the playoffs, going 0 for 8 in the four-game series.

Joyce's contract increased in his second year of arbitration, as he agreed to a one-year, $4.7 million deal with the Rays in 2014. He remained in the outfielder and designated hitter rotation alongside David DeJesus, Desmond Jennings, and Wil Myers. After a slow start to the season, in which he hit no home runs for over a month, Joyce tied Rays franchise records with five hits and 12 total bases when he hit two home runs in a 12–7 win against the Orioles on June 29. The game came just over a week after Joyce gained some notoriety for hitting a ball back into a pitching machine during batting practice. Joyce had another productive season in 2014, hitting .254 with nine home runs, but a projected raise to $5 million and steep outfield competition from Jennings, Myers, DeJesus, and Kevin Kiermaier, made the Rays seek to trade him at the conclusion of the year.

=== Los Angeles Angels of Anaheim (2015) ===
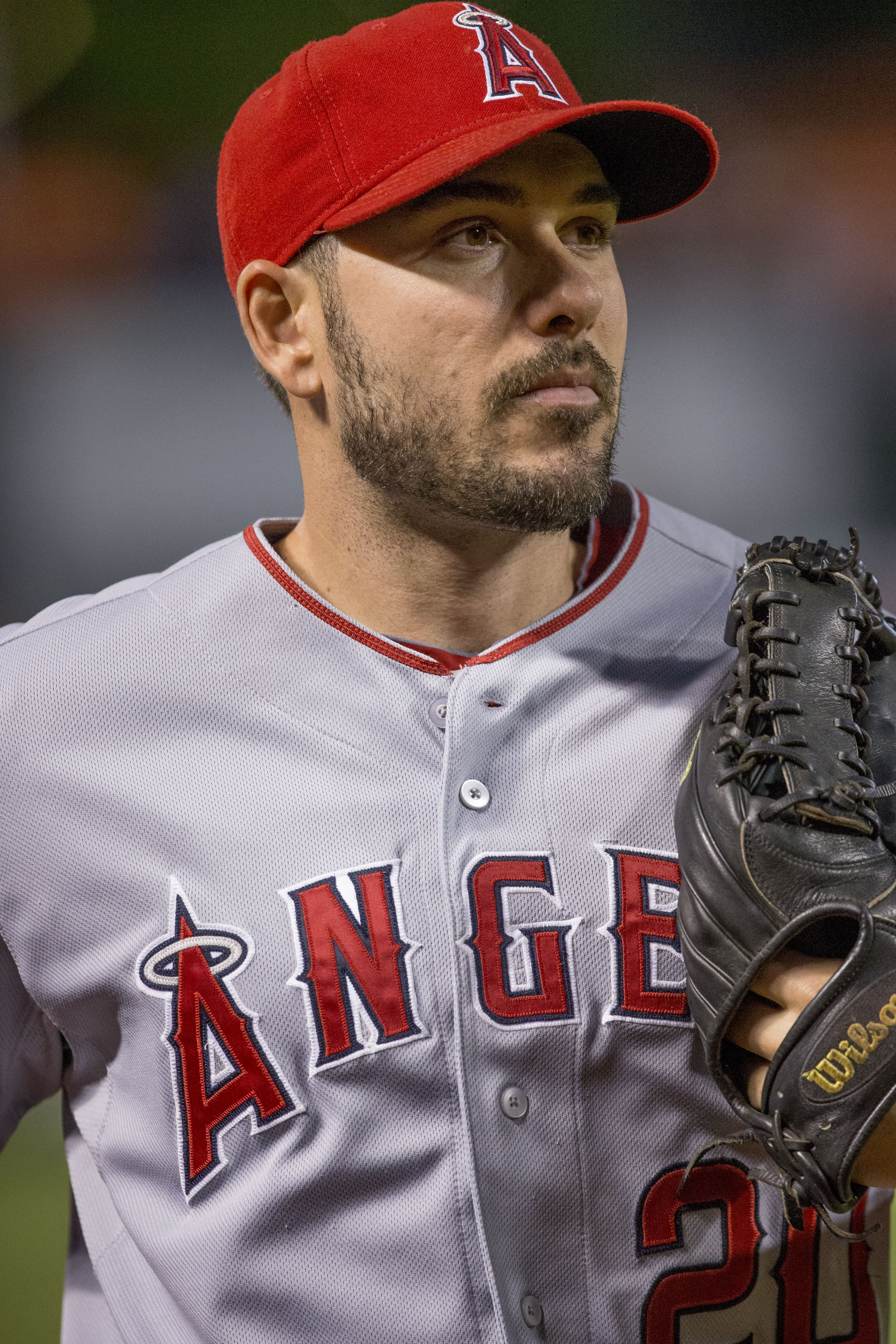
Joyce with the Angels in 2015

On December 14, 2014, the Rays traded Joyce to the Los Angeles Angels of Anaheim in exchange for right-handed reliever Kevin Jepsen. The Angels were interested in having Joyce serve as their primary designated hitter. On February 10, 2015, Joyce signed a one-year, $4.75 million contract with the Angels.

Early in the 2015 season, Joyce was scratched from a game against the Toronto Blue Jays after arriving late to batting practice. He was later fined by the MLB. He told the Los Angeles Times that he assumed the Monday game was at night and not in the early afternoon, and he worried that the mistake would cause friction with manager Mike Scioscia. Troubles continued to follow Joyce, who sustained a concussion after colliding with shortstop Erick Aybar in the fourth inning of a 13–7 victory over the Texas Rangers on July 26. Although he was eligible to leave the concussion list seven days later, Joyce continued to suffer from residual headaches and whiplash after the injury. He appeared in only six games in the month of September, and his final hit of the season was on July 9. Joyce batted .174 in 2015, with 43 hits, 21 RBIs, and five home runs in 247 at bats. At the conclusion of the 2015 season, Joyce became a free agent.

=== Pittsburgh Pirates (2016) ===
On February 20, 2016, the Pittsburgh Pirates signed Joyce to a minor league deal, including an invitation to spring training and a chance to make the major league roster. Throughout spring training, he was in competition with Sean Rodriguez and Jake Goebbert for a bench position as the Pirates' fourth outfielder.

Joyce had a career revival with the Pirates, hitting .360 with five home runs and 15 RBIs in his first 40 games. Although he was rarely used as an outfielder, Joyce established himself as an effective pinch hitter. In addition to setting an all-time single-season MLB record for pinch-hit walks with 21 in 81 plate appearances, Joyce led all pinch hitters that season in RBIs with 15 and tied for first with four home runs. He finished the season with a .242 average in 293 plate appearances. Joyce became a free agent at the conclusion of the season.

=== Oakland Athletics (2017–2018) ===
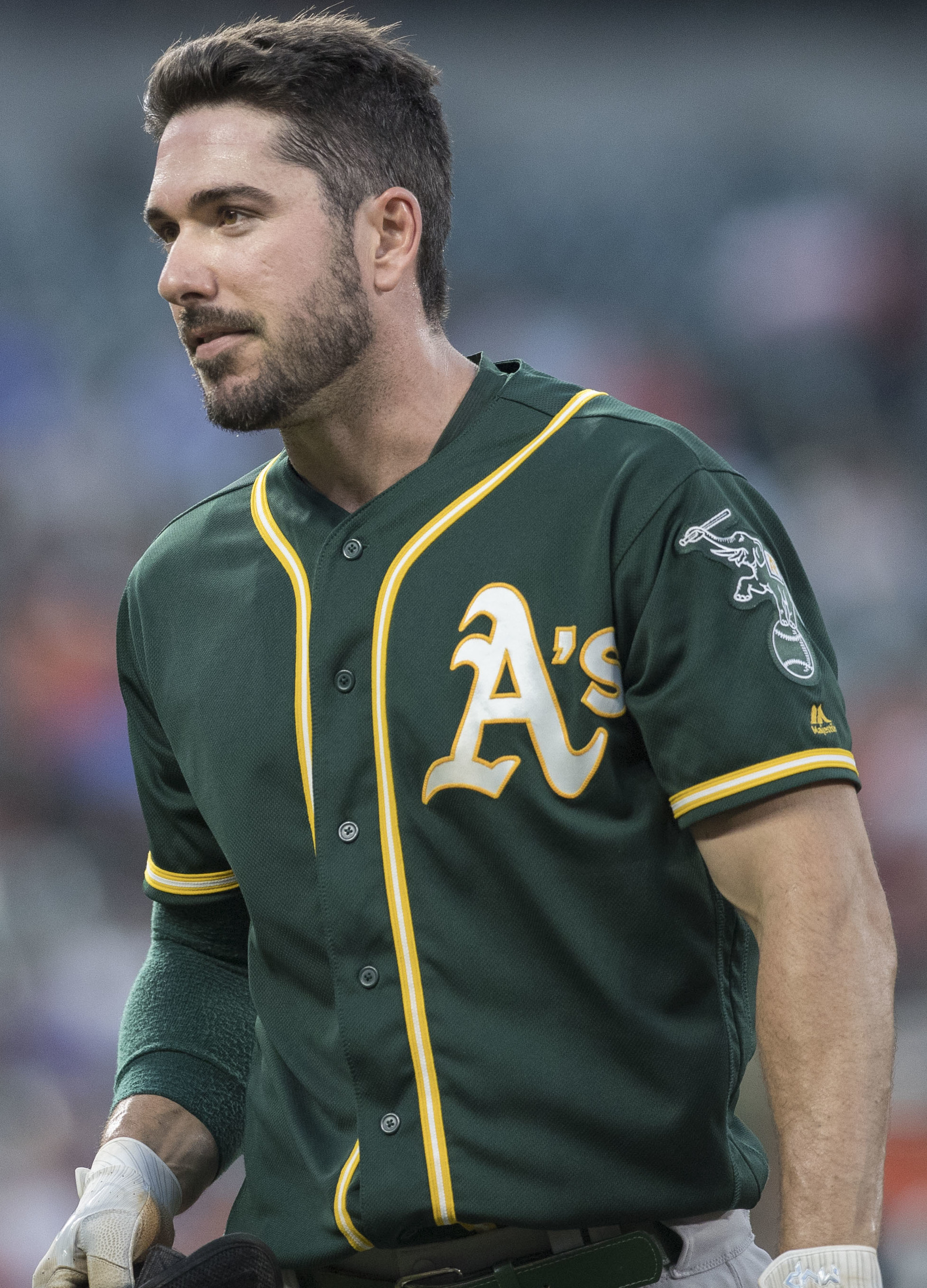
Joyce with Oakland in 2017

Joyce signed a two-year, $11 million deal with the Oakland Athletics on November 30, 2016. He had an uneven start to the season, batting around .200 until the start of June, at which point he improved to a .250 average and a .429 on-base percentage. On June 4, Joyce hit a grand slam against Shawn Kelley in the ninth inning of a game against the Washington Nationals. Although Joyce's hit helped the Athletics to rally, they were unable to complete the comeback, and lost the game 11–10. Although his offensive performance was strong, Joyce struggled in the outfield; his .973 fielding percentage was the lowest for any Athletics outfielder since Chris Singleton in 2003, and his seven errors were the most by any Oakland right fielder since Ruben Sierra in 1994. Most egregiously, on May 28, Joyce committed an error that allowed the New York Yankees to load the bases, paving the way for slugger Aaron Judge's first career grand slam.

On August 5, 2017, Joyce received a two-game suspension without pay after using a homophobic slur against a fan in the eighth inning of a game against the Angels. Joyce apologized the following day, and the A's donated $54,000 from Joyce's salary to PFLAG, an organization for families of LGBTQ+ individuals. He additionally clarified in a statement that the outburst had been motivated by a fan saying "vulgar and obscene words" about Joyce and his family, and that he "fully support[s] and hope[s] to help the LGBTQ community with their efforts in being treated fairly." Joyce finished the season with a .243 average with 25 home runs and 68 RBIs in 469 at bats.

Joyce's 2018 season with the A's was hampered by a recurrent lumbar strain. He was first placed on the disabled list for the injury on June 6, and returned to the lineup on June 22 after completing a rehab assignment with the Nashville Sounds. He returned to the disabled list again on July 7 with the same injury, and said that the pain had been bothering him for most of the season, and no one moment was responsible for this recurrence. His recovery process was repeatedly set back; Joyce did not begin rehab assignments until late August, and he was reactivated on September 1 when MLB rosters expanded. Appearing in only 83 games, Joyce batted .208 for the season, including seven home runs and 15 RBIs. He became a free agent at the conclusion of the season.

=== Atlanta Braves (2019) ===
Joyce signed a minor league contract with the Cleveland Indians on February 8, 2019, with an invitation to spring training. He was released from the team in mid-March, and signed another minor-league deal with the San Francisco Giants on March 20, 2019. On March 23, the Giants traded Joyce to the Atlanta Braves in exchange for cash considerations. Joyce served primarily as a pinch hitter for the team until August 13, when right fielder Nick Markakis suffered a broken wrist. When Markakis returned to the lineup in September, the Braves decided to keep Joyce in right field and shift Markakis to left. Joyce batted .295 for the season in 238 plate appearances, with seven home runs and 23 RBIs.

=== Miami Marlins (2020) ===
A free agent in the 2019–20 offseason, Joyce signed a one-year, $1.5 million contract with the Miami Marlins on February 3, 2020. Joyce contracted COVID-19 shortly before the Marlins' second summer training camp begun, and, although he was cleared for play prior to Opening Day, he was assigned to the team's alternate site to prepare for live pitching. The Marlins were forced to temporarily pause their 2020 season due to an outbreak of COVID-19 within the team, and when they returned to play, Joyce had been added to the active roster. Playing in 37 of the 60 games in the pandemic-shortened 2020 MLB season, Joyce recorded a .252 average, with 32 hits, 14 RBIs, and two home runs in 127 plate appearances.

On October 2, Joyce threw out Willson Contreras of the Chicago Cubs in the fourth inning of the final game of the 2020 National League Wild Card Series. In the seventh inning, Joyce hit a double, and his pinch runner Lewis Brinson scored off of an RBI single from Magneuris Sierra. These two plays helped the Marlins win the game 2–0 and advance to the postseason for the first time in 17 years. The Marlins were later swept by the Braves in the 2020 National League Division Series (NLDS). Joyce took the final out of the series, a line drive to right field that was caught by Cristian Pache. In five postseason games with the Marlins, Joyce recorded two hits and one RBI. Joyce became a free agent after the season.

=== Philadelphia Phillies (2021) ===
On February 10, 2021, Joyce and Marlins teammate Brandon Kintzler signed minor-league deals with the Philadelphia Phillies. Both players were named to the 40-man roster on March 26. On June 1, Joyce hit a grand slam against Cincinnati Reds infielder Alex Blandino, who had stepped in to pitch, taking the Phillies to a 17–3 lead. Joyce suffered a strained lower back in mid-June, and was placed on the injured list on June 19, with Matt Vierling called up in his place. On July 30, he was transferred from the 10-day to the 60-day injured list. Joyce was designated for assignment at the end of September and released into free agency on September 28, the final week of the MLB regular season. He batted just .091 for the year, with two home runs and seven RBIs in 55 at bats.

== Retirement and post-playing career ==
After the disruptions caused by the 2021–22 MLB lockout, Joyce did not receive any contract offers from MLB teams. He received an invitation to play in an independent baseball league, which he ultimately rejected, choosing to retire instead. Joyce finished his career with a lifetime .242 batting average in 1,400 games across 14 major league seasons, recording 149 home runs, 898 hits, and 503 RBI in the process. In 2023, Joyce joined Bally Sports Sun as a part-time sports analyst for his former team, the Tampa Bay Rays.

== Playing style ==
Beginning in 2016, Joyce operated primarily as a pinch hitter rather than a position player. The transition was successful: he led all active MLB pinch hitters with 40 hits and 70 total bases from 2017 through 2020, tying for first with seven home runs. A left-handed batter, most of his plate appearances during this period were against right-handed pitchers, against whom he had an .818 on-base plus slugging (OPS) since the 2016 season. As his batting improved over the course of his major league career, Joyce told MLB.com that he would watch YouTube videos of performances from Barry Bonds, Ken Griffey Jr., Jose Bautista, and Robinson Cano to understand what made each player successful behind the plate. While his mechanics were consistently strong throughout his MLB career, Joyce occasionally struggled with timing at the plate. During a decline in his productivity at Anaheim, Scioscia, the manager at the time, encouraged Joyce to think of "a concept like driving the ball up the middle or to left center" rather than focusing on physical mechanics of batting.

== Personal life ==
In December 2018, Joyce and his wife, Brittany, alongside business partner Blair Johnson, purchased the rights to five F45 Training fitness franchises, the first of which opened in New Tampa in May 2020. He also works as a real estate investor.
