= Bobby Seay =

American baseball player (born 1978)

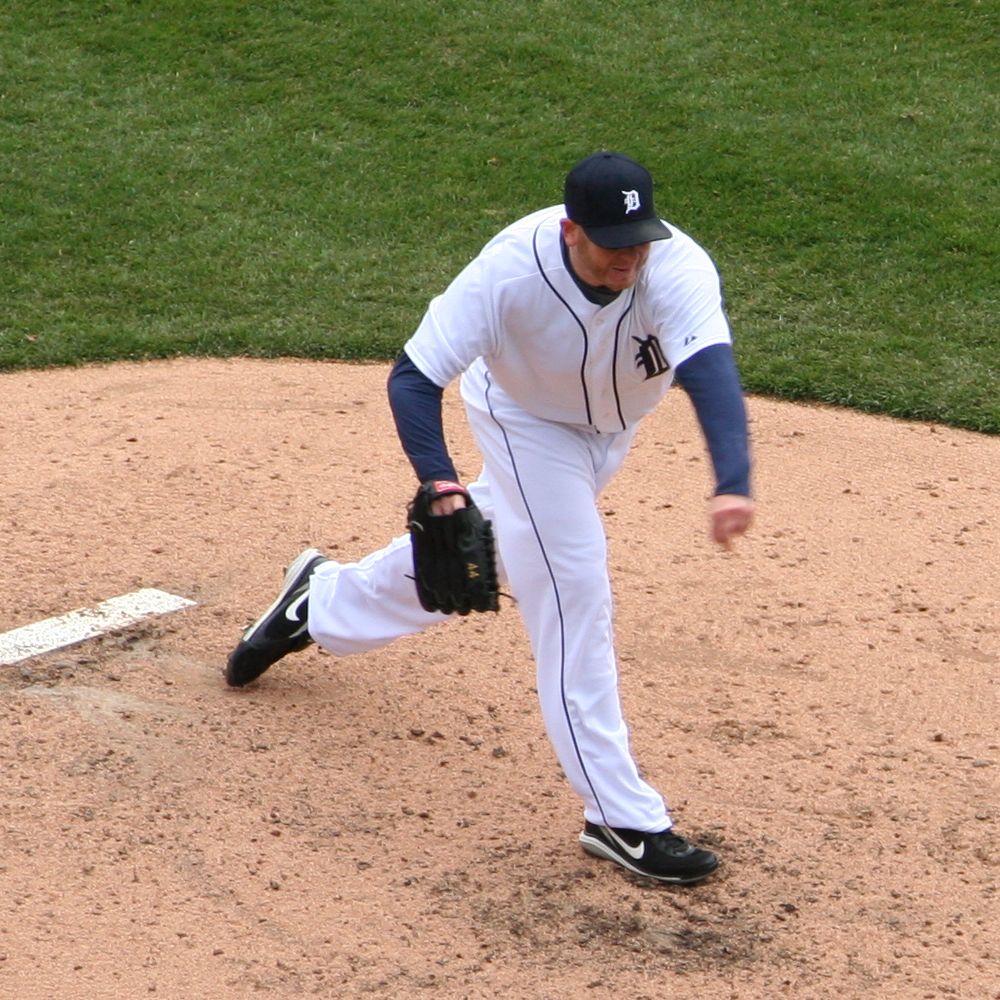
- Seay with the Detroit Tigers
- Pitcher
- Born: June 20, 1978 (age 47); Sarasota, Florida, U.S.
- Batted: Left Threw: Left

MLB debut
- August 14, 2001, for the Tampa Bay Devil Rays

Last MLB appearance
- October 1, 2009, for the Detroit Tigers

MLB statistics
- Win–loss record: 11–6
- Earned run average: 4.16
- Strikeouts: 190
- Stats at Baseball Reference

Teams
- Tampa Bay Devil Rays (2001, 2003–2004); Colorado Rockies (2005); Detroit Tigers (2006–2009)
Medals
Men's baseball
Representing the United States
Olympic Games
Gold medal – first place	2000 Sydney	Team
Pan American Games
Silver medal – second place	1999 Winnipeg	Team
World Junior Baseball Championship
Bronze medal – third place	1996 Sancti Spíritus	Team

Robert Michael Seay (pronounced "See") (born June 20, 1978) is an American former professional baseball relief pitcher. He played in Major League Baseball for the Tampa Bay Devil Rays from 2001 to 2004, the Colorado Rockies in 2005, and the Detroit Tigers from 2006 to 2009.

== High school ==
Seay is a graduate of Sarasota High School in Sarasota, Florida, where he compiled a 30–4 record in three years (1994–1996) with a 0.79 earned run average (ERA) and 362 strikeouts in 221 1/3 innings pitched. He led Sarasota High School to the Florida State Championship and #16 national ranking in his senior year, going 10–2 with an 0.70 ERA and 122 strikeouts and 29 base on balls in 70 innings. Seay was named First-team High School All-American and a finalist for Louisville Slugger's High School Player of the Year Award. Seay was drafted 12th overall by the Chicago White Sox in 1996 but was granted free agency based on Major League Baseball's amateur draft rule 4-3.

== Olympics ==
Seay was a member of the United States baseball team that won the gold medal at the 2000 Summer Olympics.

== Major Leagues ==
=== Tampa Bay Rays ===
Seay was signed by the Tampa Bay Devil Rays and made his Major League debut in 2001. His first appearance was in Yankee Stadium, allowing 1 hit and no runs. For the 2001 season, Seay pitched in 12 games. After the season, Seay was designated for assignment.

He signed a minor league deal to stay in Tampa. He missed most of the 2002 season with a shoulder injury.

In 2003, Seay appeared in 12 games while in 2004, he appeared in 21 games. He was traded in the offseason to the Colorado Rockies for outfielder Reggie Taylor after being designated for assignment.

=== Colorado Rockies ===
Then, only after three games with the Rockies he was placed on the 15-day disabled list with a strained left pectoral muscle. After the injury, Seay managed to appear in 14 more games. His ERA finished at 8.49 with Colorado.

=== Detroit Tigers ===
Seay recorded his first Major League save for the Tigers on May 20, 2007, against the St. Louis Cardinals.

In 2009, Seay tore his rotator cuff in his left shoulder, ending a solid season in which he compiled a 6–3 record and 4.25 ERA out of the Tigers bullpen. After spending all of 2010 trying to recover without surgery, Seay gave in and scheduled surgery. He became a free agent following the season.
