= Brent Clevlen =

American baseball player (born 1983)

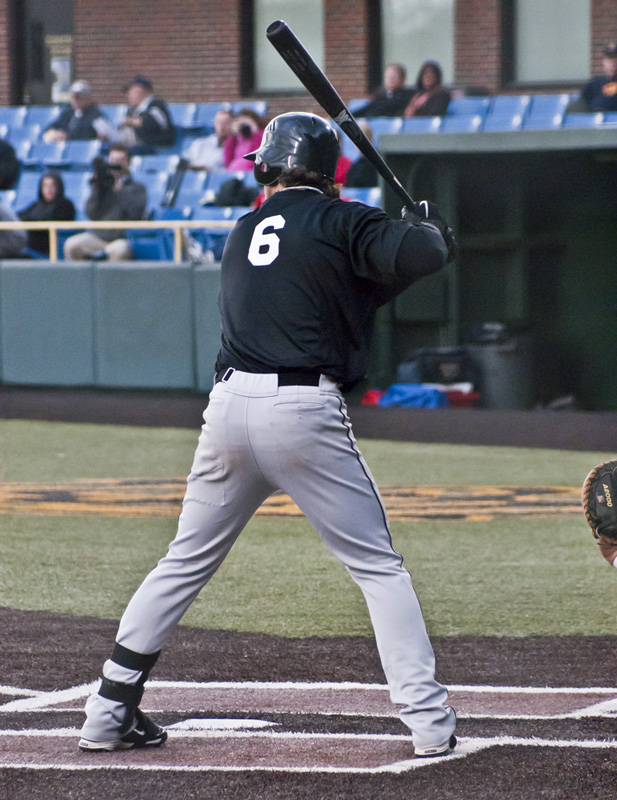
- Clevlen with the Wichita Wingnuts in 2011
- Outfielder
- Born: October 27, 1983 (age 42); Austin, Texas, U.S.
- Batted: Right Threw: Right

MLB debut
- July 30, 2006, for the Detroit Tigers

Last MLB appearance
- July 29, 2010, for the Atlanta Braves

MLB statistics
- Batting average: .233
- Home runs: 3
- Runs batted in: 7
- Stats at Baseball Reference

Teams
- Detroit Tigers (2006–2008); Atlanta Braves (2010)

Brent Aaron Clevlen (born October 27, 1983) is an American former professional baseball outfielder. He played parts of four seasons in Major League Baseball (MLB) for the Detroit Tigers and Atlanta Braves.

== Personal life ==
Clevlen graduated from Westwood High School in 2002.

== Professional career ==
Clevlen was a second-round pick (49th overall) by the Detroit Tigers in the 2002 Major League Baseball draft. In 2005, Clevlen was named the Tigers minor league players of the year while playing for the Lakeland Tigers. Clevlen made his Major League debut on July 30, 2006, in a 6–4 loss to the Minnesota Twins. He started at center field in his first game. His first catch in the field was intended to be a sacrifice fly by Minnesota catcher Joe Mauer, but ended up being an inning-ending double play, as Clevlen threw out Luis Castillo at home plate. In his first MLB at bat, he doubled off Twins ace Johan Santana.

On August 1, 2006, in his second Major League game, Clevlen hit his first major league home run against the Tampa Bay Devil Rays in the fifth inning off of Travis Harper. He later added another home run in the ninth inning off of Ruddy Lugo going 3-for-5 for the night, with three runs scored and two RBI.

Clevlen was optioned down to the Tigers' Triple–A affiliate, the Toledo Mud Hens, later in the 2006 season as Alexis Gómez emerged as a valuable bench player. Tigers manager Jim Leyland has stated that Clevlen would benefit from playing every day in Toledo, and remains second in the team's depth chart for center field. Following the season, Clevlen was named the third-best prospect and rated as possessing the best outfield arm in the Tigers' organization by Baseball America. In 2007, Brent was called up when the Tigers expanded their rosters.

In 2008, Clevlen was called up in place of injured Clete Thomas, but returned to Toledo when Thomas was reactivated.

Clevlen played in four games for the Atlanta Braves during the 2010 season before being designated for assignment on July 30, 2010. Clevlen became a free agent at the end of the season.

Clevlen was to start the season with the independent Wichita Wingnuts of the American Association, but was purchased by the Cincinnati Reds on May 9, 2011. He was returned to Wichita after playing in 26 games for the Triple-A Louisville Bats. After playing in 46 games for Wichita, Clevlen was purchased by the Philadelphia Phillies and was assigned to the Double-A Reading Fightin Phils. In all of 2011 (104 games), Clevlen hit .303 with 19 home runs and 62 RBI.

On April 19, 2012, Clevlen signed a minor league contract with the Arizona Diamondbacks, and was assigned to the Double-A Mobile Bay Bears. He also spent time with the Triple-A Reno Aces. Clevlen began 2013 in the Diamondbacks organization, splitting time with Mobile and Reno before being released. Over those two seasons (152 games), Clevlen hit .265 with 19 home runs and 77 RBI in 523 plate appearances.

On June 17, 2013, Clevlen returned to Wichita. He continued to play with Wichita in 2014 and became the American Association MVP with a slash line of .372/.447/.647 and signed with the Pericos de Puebla of the Mexican League for the 2015 season.

On February 25, 2016, Clevlen signed with the Wichita Wingnuts of the American Association of Independent Professional Baseball.

== Coaching career ==
On November 16, 2018, Clevlen was announced as the manager for the Cleburne Railroaders of the American Association of Independent Professional Baseball. On December 17, 2020, after two years as the manager, Clevlen was replaced by Mike Jeffcoat.
