= Josh Anderson (baseball) =

American baseball player (born 1982)

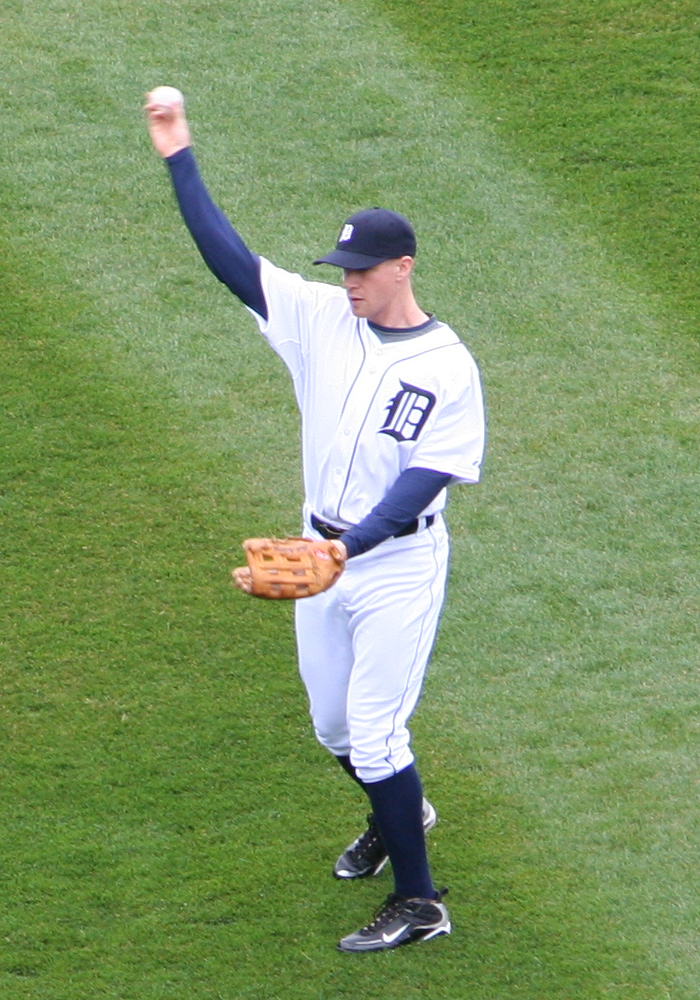
- Anderson with the Detroit Tigers
- Outfielder
- Born: August 10, 1982 (age 43); Somerset, Kentucky, U.S.
- Batted: Left Threw: Right

MLB debut
- September 2, 2007, for the Houston Astros

Last MLB appearance
- October 2, 2009, for the Kansas City Royals

MLB statistics
- Batting average: .272
- Home runs: 4
- Runs batted in: 47
- Stats at Baseball Reference

Teams
- Houston Astros (2007); Atlanta Braves (2008); Detroit Tigers (2009); Kansas City Royals (2009)

Joshua Aaron Anderson (born August 10, 1982) is an American former professional baseball outfielder. He played in Major League Baseball (MLB) from 2007 to 2009 for the Houston Astros, Atlanta Braves, Detroit Tigers, and Kansas City Royals.

== Early life ==
He played college baseball at Eastern Kentucky University and was drafted in the 4th round of the 2003 Major League Baseball draft by the Houston Astros.

== Career ==
=== Houston Astros ===
In 2004, Anderson led the minor leagues in stolen bases with 79.

After playing much of the 2007 with the Triple–A Round Rock Express, Anderson made his MLB debut on September 2, 2007.

=== Atlanta Braves ===
On November 16, 2007, Anderson was traded from the Astros to the Atlanta Braves in exchange for relief pitcher Óscar Villarreal. He had a short stint with the Braves in 2008 from May 30 – June 10 before returning to the minors. He was recalled to the Braves on August 27, 2008, after the Braves traded starting center fielder Mark Kotsay to the Boston Red Sox.

=== Detroit Tigers ===
On March 30, 2009, Anderson was traded to the Detroit Tigers in exchange for minor league pitcher Rudy Darrow. On July 24, he was designated for assignment by the Tigers.

=== Kansas City Royals ===
On July 30, 2009, Anderson was traded to the Kansas City Royals in exchange for cash considerations. On December 12, Anderson was non-tendered by the Royals and became a free agent.

=== Cincinnati Reds ===
On January 5, 2010, Anderson signed a minor league contract with the Cincinnati Reds that included an invitation to spring training. In 17 games for the Triple–A Louisville Bats, he went 5–for–40 (.125) with 5 stolen bases. Anderson was released by the Reds organization on May 11.

=== Milwaukee Brewers ===
On May 13, 2010, Anderson signed a minor league contract with the Milwaukee Brewers. Anderson was released by the Brewers organization on June 11.

=== Atlanta Braves (second stint) ===
On June 15, 2010, Anderson signed a minor league contract to return to the Atlanta Braves organization. He was assigned to the club's Triple–A affiliate, the Gwinnett Braves. On July 15, Anderson was placed on the disabled list with a fractured hand. On August 4, Anderson was released by the Braves organization.
