= Don Kelly (baseball) =

American baseball player and coach (born 1980)

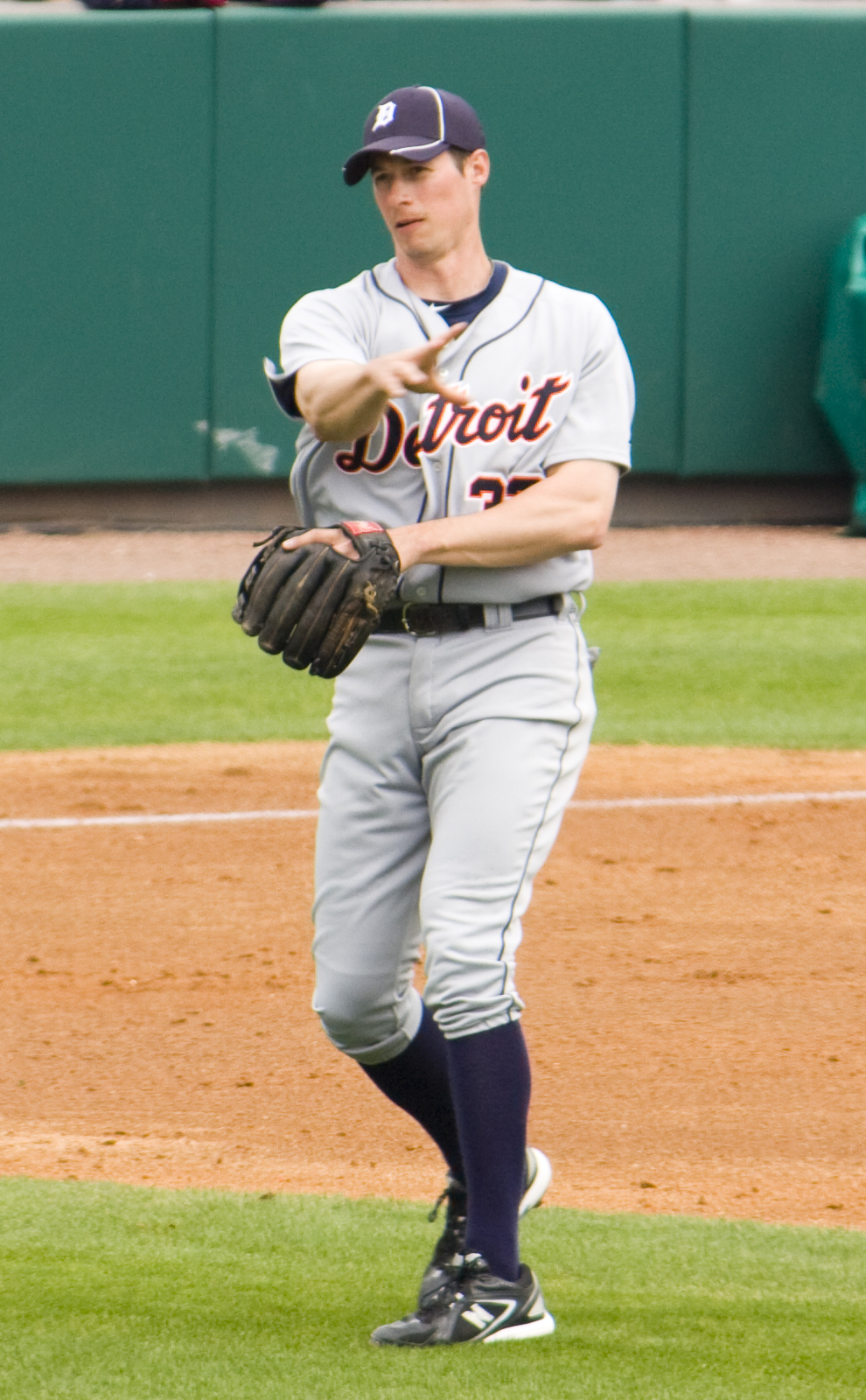
- Kelly with the Detroit Tigers in 2010

Pittsburgh Pirates – No. 12
- Utility player / Manager
- Born: February 15, 1980 (age 46); Butler, Pennsylvania, U.S.
- Batted: Left Threw: Right

MLB debut
- April 2, 2007, for the Pittsburgh Pirates

Last MLB appearance
- July 27, 2016, for the Miami Marlins

MLB statistics (through July 14, 2026)
- Batting average: .230
- Home runs: 23
- Runs batted in: 98
- Managerial record: 109–112
- Winning %: .493
- Stats at Baseball Reference
- Managerial record at Baseball Reference

Teams
- As player: Pittsburgh Pirates (2007); Detroit Tigers (2009–2014); Miami Marlins (2015–2016); As manager: Pittsburgh Pirates (2025–present); As coach: Houston Astros (2019); Pittsburgh Pirates (2020–2025)

Donald Thomas Kelly (born February 15, 1980) is an American former professional baseball utility player and coach who is the manager for the Pittsburgh Pirates of Major League Baseball (MLB). He played in MLB for the Pirates, Detroit Tigers, and Miami Marlins. Kelly played every position on the field in the major leagues, including pitcher. Over the course of his career, he mainly played the outfield and third base.

== Early life and education ==
Kelly was born in Butler, Pennsylvania, and played baseball at suburban Mt. Lebanon High School; in his senior year the team won the Class AAA state title. At Mt. Lebanon, he regularly alternated between the two middle infield positions with Josh Wilson, another future Major League player.

He was not then considered a "draftable" player and attended Point Park University, a liberal arts college in downtown Pittsburgh. Over three seasons he batted .413 and struck out just 20 times in over 500 at-bats.

== Playing career ==
In the summer of 2000 Kelly played for the Petersburg Generals of the Coastal Plain League, a collegiate summer league. Kelly's collegiate performance prompted interest from major league teams and the Detroit Tigers drafted him in the eighth round (237th overall) of the 2001 Major League Baseball draft. Detroit assigned him to the Low-A Oneonta Tigers in the New York–Penn League, where he batted .286 and struck out sixteen times—second lowest in the league. The next year Detroit promoted him to the Single-A West Michigan Whitecaps in the Midwest League. Kelly was named the starting shortstop for the Eastern All-Stars in the league's mid-season All-Star game.

Kelly's versatility was first put to the test at the professional level when he was with the High-A Lakeland Tigers in 2003. He shifted to third base when Anderson Hernández replaced him at shortstop. Kelly eventually spent more time at first and second base after Ryan Raburn took over at third. Kelly got off to a strong start: by mid-June his .363 average led the Florida State League and the local Ledger described him as a "slugger." Although his average eventually cooled to .317, Detroit promoted him in mid-season to the Double-A Erie SeaWolves, where he joined future brother-in-law Matt Walker (brother of former Major League infielder Neil Walker).

In 2004 Detroit invited Kelly to spring training, and in his first at-bat in a spring training game Kelly hit a home run against the Pittsburgh Pirates. On March 17, Detroit optioned Kelly back to Erie, but he missed most of the season with an injured shoulder. Kelly returned to Erie in 2005 and picked up where he had left off, hitting .340 over 82 games. Baseball America named Kelly the best-hitting prospect in the Eastern League. On June 30, Detroit promoted him to the Triple-A Toledo Mud Hens of the International League, one step away from the majors.

Kelly played in 43 games for the Mud Hens in 2005 and batted .250, a tenure partially interrupted by a groin injury. Commented Mud Hens manager Larry Parrish: "Hitting-wise, there's been a little bit of an adjustment for him here...He tore up Double-A, and here he's done alright. He's holding his own. But it's his first year here, and he's still going through a learning process." In the off-season Kelly played for the Mesa Solar Sox of the Arizona Fall League. In 2006 Kelly almost made the Major League team out of spring training but instead returned to Toledo. Detroit manager Jim Leyland said "When push came to shove, he ran into a numbers game." At Toledo Kelly's numbers fell off; Detroit demoted him to Erie after hitting .228. At Erie his numbers improved to .272, but at the end of the season Detroit removed Kelly from their 40-man roster, making him a free agent.

=== Pittsburgh Pirates ===
The Pittsburgh Pirates, Kelly's hometown team, signed him to a minor league contract on December 14, 2006. He made the Major League team as a utility player, filling in at second base, shortstop, and left and right field. His major league debut came on April 2, 2007, in a season-opening 4–2 victory over the Houston Astros at Minute Maid Park. As a pinch hitter for Dámaso Marte, Kelly popped out to the shortstop to end the Pirates half of the ninth inning. He finished the game at second base.

Kelly played sparingly, amassing 27 at-bats over 25 games and hitting .148, before Pittsburgh designated him for assignment on June 12 to make room for Dan Kolb. Kelly cleared waivers and joined the Triple-A Indianapolis Indians on June 23. Kelly finished out the season with Indianapolis, batting .247 and playing both shortstop and in the outfield. Pittsburgh granted Kelly free agency at the end of the season.

=== Arizona Diamondbacks ===
Kelly signed a minor league contract with the Arizona Diamondbacks and spent the entire 2008 season with the Triple-A Tucson Sidewinders, where he batted .275 but never made it with the major league club and was granted free agency at the end of the season.

=== Detroit Tigers ===
In 2009, Kelly signed a minor league contract with an invitation to spring training with the Tigers. Following spring training Kelly rejoined the Mud Hens, with whom he had last played in 2006. On June 11, 2009, the Tigers called Kelly up to the Major League club to replace outfielder Clete Thomas. Kelly played his first game for Detroit against the Pittsburgh Pirates, his former club. After going hitless in his first game, he hit a two-RBI single and a double against Pittsburgh, obtaining his first major league extra base hit and RBIs.

On October 1, 2010, Kelly hit a home run in both games of a doubleheader against the Baltimore Orioles.

On July 24, 2011, Kelly was pranked by Justin Verlander after noticing that his right shoe was caught on fire.

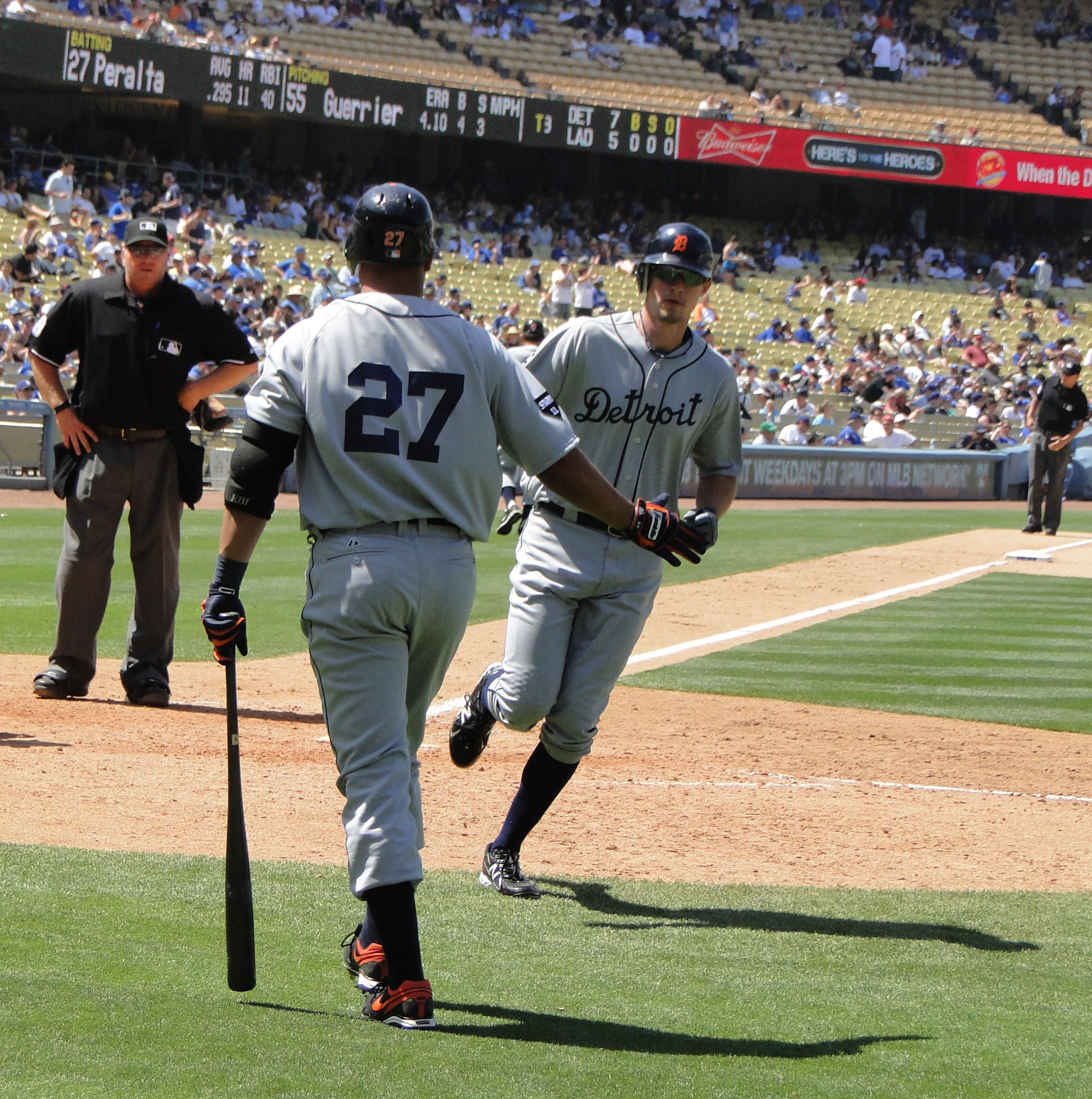
Jhonny Peralta greets Kelly after a home run at Dodger Stadium

In his first two seasons with the Tigers, Kelly added first and third base and center field to the positions he has played in the majors. He was called on to pitch with two outs in the top of the ninth inning after manager Jim Leyland thoroughly depleted his bullpen in a 16–9 defeat to the New York Mets at Comerica Park on June 29, 2011. Throwing only five pitches, he used a curveball to get Scott Hairston to fly out to center field. Kelly was the first position player to pitch in a game for the Tigers since Shane Halter did it in October 2000. He reached the milestone of having played every position on the field in his major league career in a 15–3 loss at home to the San Francisco Giants three nights later on July 2. He entered the contest at the start of the fourth inning, replacing starting catcher Víctor Martínez who had left the game with a bruised right shoulder.

In the decisive Game 5 of the 2011 American League Division Series against the New York Yankees, Kelly belted a first-inning solo home run off Iván Nova into the right field seats at Yankee Stadium to give the Tigers a 1–0 lead, one which they never relinquished. Detroit went on to win the game, 3–2, and moved on to face the Texas Rangers in the American League Championship Series.

On August 3, 2012, Kelly was designated for assignment to make room on the 40-man roster for outfielder Andy Dirks, who returned to the Tigers after coming off the disabled list the same day. On August 9, 2012, Kelly cleared waivers and his contract was outrighted by Detroit to their Triple-A affiliate Toledo. The Tigers called him up again on September 1, and later named him to their post-season roster after the team clinched the AL Central division. He hit a walk-off sacrifice fly in Game 2 of Detroit's American League Division Series against the Oakland Athletics.

On October 31, 2012, Don Kelly cleared waivers and became a free agent. On January 16, 2013, Kelly signed a minor league deal with the Tigers. He made the team out of spring training, and played another full season as the club's super-utility man. In 216 at-bats, Don hit .222 with six home runs and 23 RBIs, while playing six defensive positions. After the season, Kelly signed a one-year deal with Detroit that would pay him $1 million in 2014, avoiding arbitration. On November 3, 2014, Kelly declined his minor league assignment and became a free agent.

=== Miami Marlins ===
On January 18, 2015, Kelly signed a minor league contract with the Miami Marlins.

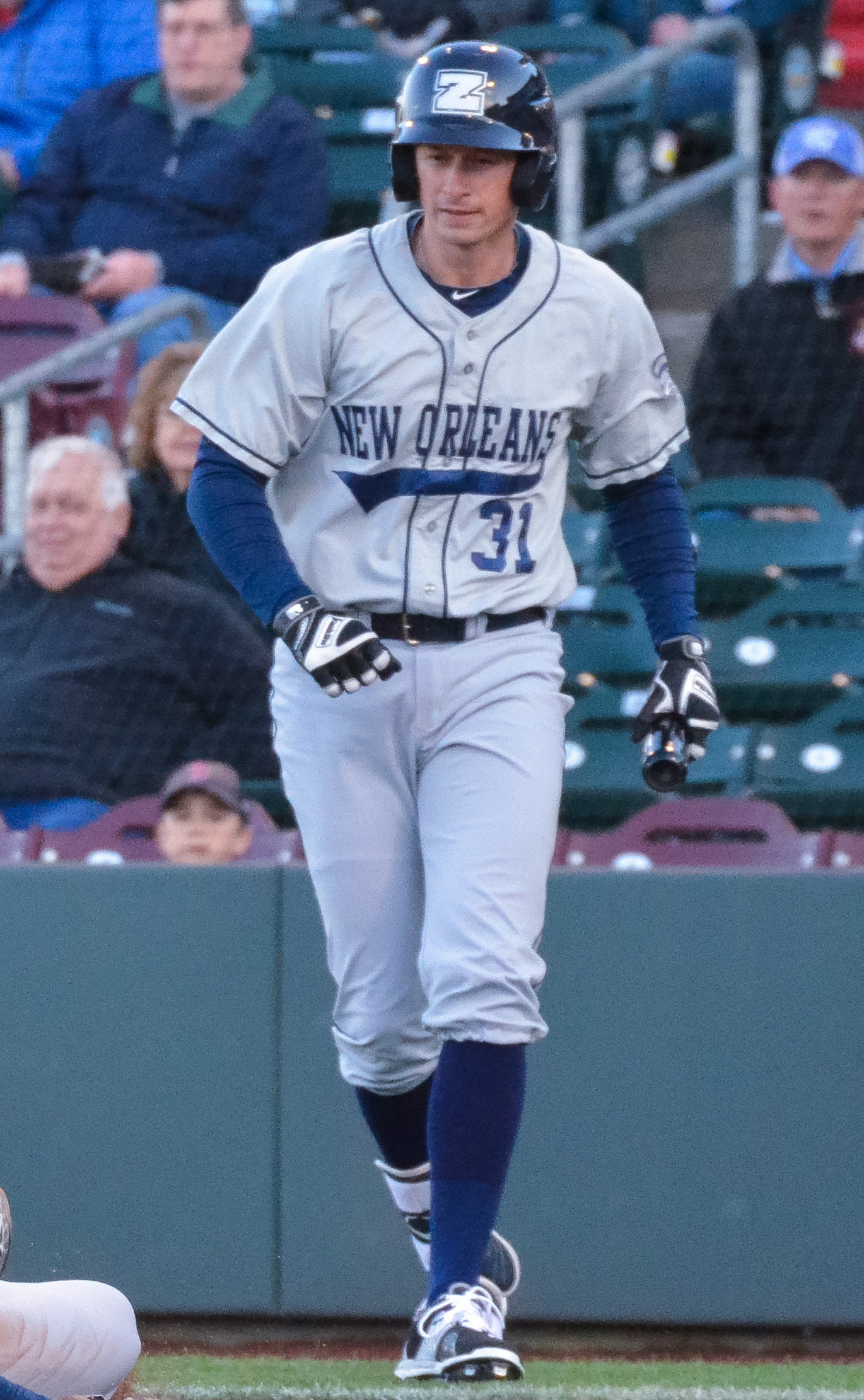
Kelly with the New Orleans Zephyrs in 2016

After hitting .270 with two doubles and five RBI with .681 OPS in Spring training, the Marlins purchased Kelly's contract and placed him on the Opening Roster.

Kelly suffered a fractured finger early in the 2015 season and was placed on the 15-day disabled list on April 13. Kelly had two at-bats before getting hurt and was 0-for-2.

On July 18, 2015, the Marlins announced that Kelly would have season-ending Tommy John surgery.

On February 3, 2016, Kelly re-signed with the Marlins to a minor league deal with an invitation to spring training. He was released by the Marlins on March 29 and re-signed the next day. Kelly was called up from New Orleans on July 6.

With the return of Dee Gordon to the Marlins roster after an 80-day suspension for PED use, Kelly was designated for assignment on July 28, 2016.

== Post-playing career ==
=== Detroit Tigers ===
On February 18, 2017, Kelly was named a scout and assistant on the player development staff for the Detroit Tigers organization. On September 29, Kelly was promoted to a Major League scout for the Tigers.

=== Houston Astros ===
On November 21, 2018, Kelly was named the Houston Astros' first base coach.

=== Pittsburgh Pirates ===
Kelly was named the Pittsburgh Pirates' bench coach on December 7, 2019. On May 8, 2025, Kelly was named manager of the Pirates following the firing of Derek Shelton.

On September 29, 2025, Kelly and the Pirates agreed to a contract extension.

=== Managerial record ===
As of September 27, 2026

Team	Year	Regular season					Postseason			
Team	Year	Games	Won	Lost	Win %	Finish	Won	Lost	Win %	Result
PIT	2025	124	59	65	.476	5th in NL Central	–	–	–	–
PIT	2026	162	82	80	.506	3rd in NL Central	–	–	–	–
Total		286	141	145	.493					

== Personal life ==
Kelly spends his offseasons in Mars, Pennsylvania, with his wife, Carrie, and their three sons, Brett, Luke and Brooks. He married Carrie Walker on January 13, 2007; his brothers-in-law include former major league infielder Neil Walker and former minor leaguer Matt Walker; his father-in-law is former major league pitcher Tom Walker. His wife Carrie was a women’s basketball player at Wagner College and the Northeast Conference Rookie of the Year in 2001. She went on to play a year of professional basketball for Killarney (St. Paul’s) of the Irish Women’s SuperLeague. His sister Ashlee was a standout women's basketball player for Quinnipiac University and the Northeast Conference Player of the Year in 2003. After spending three years as head women's basketball coach at Mercy College, she was named assistant coach at Iona College on July 1, 2009.
