= Wilkin Ramírez =

Dominican baseball player (born 1985)

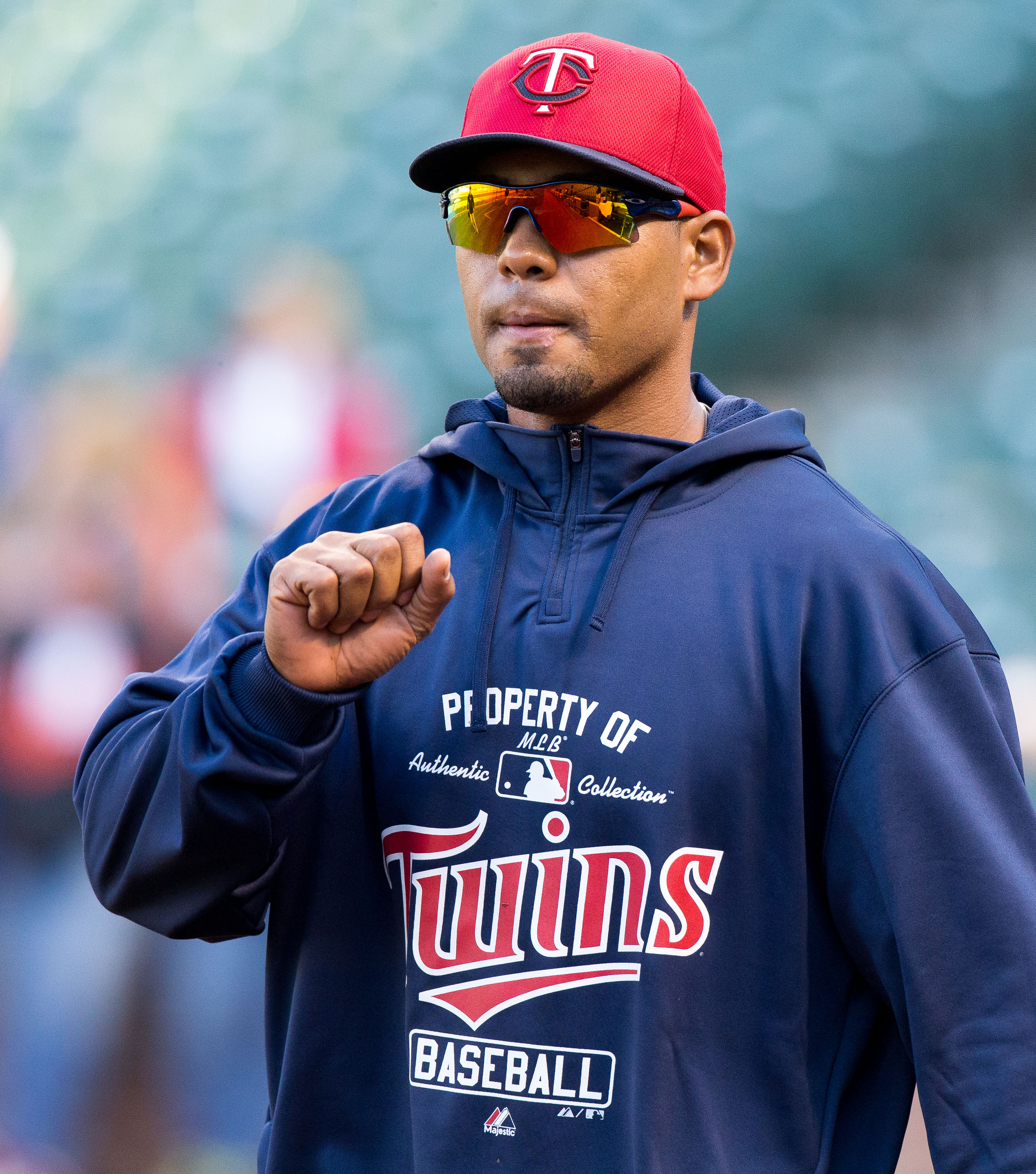
- Ramirez with the Minnesota Twins
- Outfielder
- Born: October 25, 1985 (age 40); Baní, Dominican Republic
- Batted: Right Threw: Right

MLB debut
- May 20, 2009, for the Detroit Tigers

Last appearance
- August 23, 2013, for the Minnesota Twins

MLB statistics
- Batting average: .272
- Home Runs: 1
- Runs batted in: 11
- Stats at Baseball Reference

Teams
- Detroit Tigers (2009); Atlanta Braves (2011); Minnesota Twins (2013)

Wilkin Emilio Ramírez (born October 25, 1985) is a Dominican former professional baseball outfielder. He played in Major League Baseball (MLB) for the Detroit Tigers, Atlanta Braves, and Minnesota Twins.

== Playing career ==
=== Detroit Tigers ===
==== Minor leagues ====
Ramírez signed with the Detroit Tigers at the age of 17 as an undrafted free agent in 2003. He began playing for the Gulf Coast League Tigers in the Gulf Coast League in 2003, but missed the entire 2004 season due to a shoulder injury. In 2005, he joined the Low-A West Michigan Whitecaps in the Midwest League, where he established himself as a prospect by hitting 16 home runs with 21 stolen bases. Whitecaps manager Matt Walbeck praised Ramírez's work ethic: "He's got a very good attitude, he likes to play." Baseball America named him the #5 prospect in the organization. In 2006, he played for the Single-A Lakeland Flying Tigers, where he dealt with injuries that shortened his season. In 2007, Ramírez split time between Lakeland and the Erie SeaWolves of the Double-A Eastern League. 2008 saw Ramírez spend most of the season in Erie before earning a call-up to the Triple-A Toledo Mud Hens. After the 2008 season, Ramírez was named the 6th best Tigers prospect by Baseball America. In 2008, Ramírez participated in the All-Star Futures Game during the Major League Baseball All-Star Game weekend.

==== Major leagues ====
On November 21, 2008, the Tigers added Ramírez to their 40-man roster to protect him from the Rule 5 draft. He began the 2009 season with Triple-A Toledo, hitting .258/.326/.445 with 17 home runs, 51 RBI, and 33 stolen bases across 113 appearances. On September 1, 2009, Ramírez was promoted to the major leagues for the first time. Ramírez made 15 appearances for Detroit during his rookie campaign, going 4-for-11 (.364) with one home run and three RBI.

Ramírez split time between Erie and Toledo to begin the 2010 season; he also participated in the 2010 Futures Game for the World team. On July 28, 2010, Ramírez was designated for assignment by the Tigers following the acquisition of Jhonny Peralta.

=== Atlanta Braves ===
On July 31, 2010, Ramírez was traded to the Atlanta Braves in exchange for a player to be named later. In 81 appearances for the Triple-A Gwinnett Braves, he batted .267/.307/.458 with 11 home runs, 36 RBI, and 19 stolen bases. On September 1, Ramírez was removed from the 40-man roster and sent outright to Gwinnett, enabling him to elect minor league free agency.

On November 29, 2010, Ramírez re-signed with the Braves organization on a minor league contract that included an invitation to spring training. On May 22, 2011, the Braves selected Ramírez's contract, adding him to their active roster. In 20 appearances for Atlanta, he batted .231/.333/.308 with two RBI. On November 1, Ramírez was removed from the 40-man roster and sent outright to Gwinnett.

=== Minnesota Twins ===
On November 18, 2011, Ramírez signed a minor league contract with the Minnesota Twins organization. He split the 2012 season between the High-A Fort Myers Miracle, Double-A New Britain Rock Cats, and Triple-A Rochester Red Wings, hitting a combined .288/.326/.486 with 19 home runs and 61 RBI across 113 appearances.

On November 17, 2012, Ramírez re-signed with the Twins organization on a new minor league contract. On March 31, 2013, the Twins selected Ramírez's contract after he made the team's Opening Day roster. He made his season debut with the Twins in the bottom of the 6th inning on April 1. In 35 games for the Twins, Ramírez batted .272/.302/.370 with no home runs and six RBI. On October 22, he was removed from the 40–man roster and sent outright to Triple–A Rochester.

Ramírez made 107 appearances for Rochester in 2014, batting .262/.305/.368 with four home runs, 41 RBI, and eight stolen bases. Ramírez re–signed with the Twins on a minor league contract on December 23, 2014. Returning to Rochester, he made 43 appearances for the Red Wings in 2015, slashing .232/.238/.387 with three home runs, 14 RBI, and three stolen bases. After the season, he was selected to the roster for the Dominican Republic national baseball team at the 2015 WBSC Premier12.

=== Bridgeport Bluefish ===
On March 22, 2016, Ramírez signed with the Bridgeport Bluefish of the Atlantic League of Professional Baseball. In 25 games for the Bluefish, he slashed .274/.315/.357 with one home run, eight RBI, and two stolen bases. Ramírez became a free agent after the season and retired during the offseason.
