= 2009 Minnesota Twins season =

2009 Minnesota Twins
- American League Central champions
- League: American League
- Division: Central
- Ballpark: Hubert H. Humphrey Metrodome
- City: Minneapolis
- Record: 87–76 (.534)
- Divisional place: 1st
- Owners: Jim Pohlad
- General managers: Bill Smith
- Managers: Ron Gardenhire
- Television: Fox Sports North; WFTC (My 29) (Dick Bremer, Bert Blyleven)
- Radio: AM 1500 KSTP (John Gordon, Dan Gladden, Jack Morris, Kris Atteberry)
- Stats: ESPN.com; Baseball Reference

The 2009 Minnesota Twins season was the 49th season for the franchise in Minnesota, and the 109th overall in the American League. It was their final season at the Hubert H. Humphrey Metrodome with their new stadium, Target Field, opening in 2010. They ended the regular season as American League Central champions after defeating the Detroit Tigers in a one game tie-breaker. They were then swept in the ALDS by the New York Yankees. The team's star catcher and Minnesota native Joe Mauer won the American League Most Valuable Player Award.

== Regular season ==
On April 17, Jason Kubel hit for the cycle, becoming the ninth Twin to accomplish the feat. Kubel joins just six other American League cycle-hitters that filled the 'HR' slot with a grand slam home run.

On May 22, Michael Cuddyer hit for the cycle, becoming the tenth Twin to accomplish the feat. When he homered twice in the seventh inning on August 23, Cuddy became the only man ever in baseball to accomplish both feats in the same season. Prior to Kubel last month, the eight previous Twins' cycle hitters were Rod Carew, 1970; César Tovar, 1972; Larry Hisle, 1976; Lyman Bostock, 1976; Mike Cubbage, 1978; Gary Ward, 1980; Kirby Puckett, 1986 and Carlos Gómez, 2008.

After 319 consecutive games, Justin Morneau sat out June 21. He hadn't missed a game since June 27, 2007, until manager Ron Gardenhire held him out that day. His consecutive-games streak remains the longest for the Twins club.

At the All-Star Game at Busch Stadium, Joe Mauer was the American League's starting catcher, and doubled in three at-bats. Justin Morneau and Joe Nathan entered as reserves. Nathan pitched an inning, walked one, struck out one and gave up one hit, earning a hold.

Joe Mauer won his third American League batting title, with a .365 average. In the forty-nine seasons the Minnesota Twins have existed, a Twin has won the AL batting title fourteen times -- Rod Carew (7), Tony Oliva (3), Joe Mauer (3) and Kirby Puckett (1).

Closer Joe Nathan saved 47 games to top Eddie Guardado's previous club record of 45. He was a co-winner of the Rolaids Relief Man Award (with Mariano Rivera), only the second Twin (after Bill Campbell, in 1976) to do so. Nathan now leads in Twins career saves with 260.

For the first time ever, four Twins topped 90 RBI: Jason Kubel (103), Justin Morneau (100), Joe Mauer (96) and Michael Cuddyer (94).

Along with winning the Gold Glove and Silver Slugger awards, Joe Mauer was named American League MVP, the fifth Twin in history to be so honored. Mauer is the first AL catcher to lead the league in batting average, slugging percentage and on-base percentage.

=== Season standings ===
AL Central
Team	W	L	Pct.	GB	Home	Road
Minnesota Twins	87	76	.534	—	49‍–‍33	38‍–‍43
Detroit Tigers	86	77	.528	1	51‍–‍30	35‍–‍47
Chicago White Sox	79	83	.488	7½	43‍–‍38	36‍–‍45
Cleveland Indians	65	97	.401	21½	35‍–‍46	30‍–‍51
Kansas City Royals	65	97	.401	21½	33‍–‍48	32‍–‍49

=== Record vs. opponents ===
2009 American League record Source: MLB Standings Grid – 2009
Team	BAL	BOS	CWS	CLE	DET	KC	LAA	MIN	NYY	OAK	SEA	TB	TEX	TOR	NL
Baltimore	–	2–16	5–4	2–5	3–5	4–4	2–8	3–2	5–13	1–5	4–5	8–10	5–5	9–9	11–7
Boston	16–2	–	4–4	7–2	6–1	5–3	4–5	4–2	9–9	5–5	2–4	9–9	2–7	11–7	11–7
Chicago	4–5	4−4	–	10–8	9–9	9–9	5–4	6−12	3–4	4–5	4–5	6–2	2–4	1–6	12–6
Cleveland	5–2	2–7	8–10	–	4–14	10–8	2–4	8–10	3–5	2–5	6–4	5–3	1–8	4–4	5–13
Detroit	5–3	1–6	9–9	14–4	–	9–9	5–4	7–12	1–5	5–4	5–4	5–2	7–2	3–5	10–8
Kansas City	4–4	3–5	9–9	8–10	9–9	–	1–9	6–12	2–4	2–6	5–4	1–9	3–3	4–3	8–10
Los Angeles	8–2	5–4	4–5	4–2	4–5	9–1	–	6–4	5–5	12–7	10–9	4–2	8–11	4–4	14–4
Minnesota	2–3	2–4	12–6	10–8	12–7	12–6	4–6	–	0–7	4–6	5–5	3–3	6–4	3–5	12–6
New York	13–5	9–9	4–3	5–3	5–1	4–2	5–5	7–0	–	7–2	6–4	11–7	5–4	12–6	10–8
Oakland	5–1	5–5	5–4	5–2	4–5	6–2	7–12	6–4	2–7	–	5–14	6–4	11–8	3–6	5–13
Seattle	5–4	4–2	5–4	4–6	4–5	4–5	9–10	5–5	4–6	14–5	–	5–3	8–11	3–4	11–7
Tampa Bay	10–8	9–9	2–6	3–5	2–5	9–1	2–4	3–3	7–11	4–6	3–5	–	3–6	14–4	13–5
Texas	5–5	7–2	4–2	8–1	2–7	3–3	11–8	4–6	4–5	8–11	11–8	6–3	–	5–5	9–9
Toronto	9–9	7–11	6–1	4–4	5–3	3–4	4–4	5–3	6–12	6–3	4–3	4–14	5–5	–	7–11

- Source: MLB Standings Grid – 2009

=== Roster ===
2009 Minnesota Twins
Roster
Pitchers: 18 Luis Ayala; 30 Scott Baker; 53 Nick Blackburn; 49 Craig Breslow; 28 Jesse Crain; 39 R. A. Dickey; 52 Brian Duensing; 63 Armando Gabino; 54 Matt Guerrier; 60 Sean Henn; 38 Philip Humber; 44 Bobby Keppel; 47 Francisco Liriano; 37 Ron Mahay; 49 Jeff Manship; 50 José Mijares; 31 Juan Morillo; 61 Kevin Mulvey; 36 Joe Nathan; 48 Carl Pavano; 15 Glen Perkins; 60 Jon Rauch; 59 Kevin Slowey; 51 Anthony Swarzak	Catchers: 7 Joe Mauer; 58 José Morales; 55 Mike Redmond; Infielders: 32 Brian Buscher; 18 Orlando Cabrera; 25 Alexi Casilla; 24 Joe Crede; 23 Brendan Harris; 19 Justin Huber; 33 Justin Morneau; 8 Nick Punto; 20 Matt Tolbert; Outfielders: 5 Michael Cuddyer; 22 Carlos Gómez; 16 Jason Kubel; 11 Jason Pridie; 2 Denard Span; 21 Delmon Young	Manager: 35 Ron Gardenhire; Coaches: 40 Rick Anderson (pitching); 9 Steve Liddle (bench); 43 Rick Stelmaszek (bullpen); 45 Scott Ullger (third base); 46 Joe Vavra (hitting); 13 Jerry White (first base)

=== Game log ===
2009 Game Log
April: 11–11

#	Date	Opponent	Score	Win	Loss	Save	Attendance	Record
1	April 6	Mariners	6–1	Hernández (1–0)	Liriano (0–1)		48,514	0–1
2	April 7	Mariners	6–5	Ayala (1–0)	Morrow (0–1)		23,755	1–1
3	April 8	Mariners	6–5	Slowey (1–0)	Silva (0–1)	Nathan (1)	22,270	2–1
4	April 9	Mariners	2–0	Washburn (1–0)	Perkins (0–1)	Morrow (1)	20,105	2–2
5	April 10	@ White Sox	12–5	Dickey (1–0)	Contreras (0–1)		25,422	3–2
6	April 11	@ White Sox	8–0	Colón (1–0)	Liriano (0–2)		33,935	3–3
7	April 12	@ White Sox	6–1	Buehrle (1–0)	Blackburn (0–1)	Jenks (2)	25,571	3–4
8	April 13	Blue Jays	8–6	Frasor (1–0)	Ayala (1–1)	Ryan (1)	16,410	3–5
9	April 14	Blue Jays	3–2 (11)	Crain (1–0)	Carlson (0–1)		15,375	4–5
10	April 15	Blue Jays	12–2	Richmond (1–0)	Baker (0–1)		19,471	4–6
11	April 16	Blue Jays	9–2	Halladay (3–0)	Liriano (0–3)		15,169	4–7
12	April 17	Angels	11–9	Guerrier (1–0)	Bulger (0–1)	Nathan (2)	24,168	5–7
13	April 18	Angels	9–2	Slowey (2–0)	Jepsen (0–2)		34,286	6–7
14	April 19	Angels	3–1	Perkins (1–1)	Loux (0–1)	Nathan (3)	28,302	7–7
	April 21	@ Red Sox	Postponed (rain); rescheduled for April 22					
15	April 22	@ Red Sox	10–1 (7)	Wakefield (2–1)	Baker (0–2)		37,608	7–8
16	April 22	@ Red Sox	7–3	Penny (2–0)	Liriano (0–4)		37,494	7–9
17	April 24	@ Indians	5–1	Blackburn (1–1)	Carmona (1–3)		20,215	8–9
18	April 25	@ Indians	7–1	Slowey (3–0)	Pavano (0–3)		23,186	9–9
19	April 26	@ Indians	4–2	Laffey (2–0)	Perkins (1–2)	Wood (4)	20,153	9–10
20	April 27	Rays	7–1	Niemann (2–2)	Baker (0–3)		17,988	9–11
21	April 28	Rays	4–3	Nathan (1–0)	Howell (0–2)		18,974	10–11
22	April 29	Rays	8–3	Blackburn (2–1)	Kazmir (3–2)		21,715	11–11

May: 14–16

#	Date	Opponent	Score	Win	Loss	Save	Attendance	Record
23	May 1	Royals	7–5	Slowey (4–0)	Ponson (0–4)	Nathan (4)	24,727	12–11
24	May 2	Royals	10–7 (11)	Soria (1–0)	Breslow (0–1)		29,061	12–12
25	May 3	Royals	7–5	Meche (2–2)	Baker (0–4)	Soria (6)	31,845	12–13
26	May 4	@ Tigers	7–2	Liriano (1–4)	Jackson (1–2)		21,298	13–13
27	May 5	@ Tigers	9–0	Porcello (2–3)	Blackburn (2–2)		23,754	13–14
28	May 6	@ Orioles	4–1 (6)	Bass (1–1)	Slowey (4–1)		10,566	13–15
29	May 7	@ Orioles	5–4	Johnson (2–0)	Mijares (0–1)	Sherrill (5)	11,399	13–16
30	May 8	Mariners	11–0	Baker (1–4)	Jakubauskas (1–4)		29,714	14–16
31	May 9	Mariners	9–6	Liriano (2–4)	Hernández (4–2)	Nathan (5)	29,552	15–16
32	May 10	Mariners	5–3	Batista (2–0)	Crain (1–1)	Morrow (6)	25,555	15–17
33	May 12	Tigers	6–2	Slowey (5–1)	Galarraga (3–3)		24,807	16–17
34	May 13	Tigers	14–10 (13)	Crain (2–1)	Lyon (1–3)		22,178	17–17
35	May 14	Tigers	6–5	Breslow (1–1)	Seay (0–1)	Nathan (6)	26,046	18–17
36	May 15	@ Yankees	5–4	Veras (2–1)	Nathan (1–1)		43,856	18–18
37	May 16	@ Yankees	6–4 (11)	Aceves (1–0)	Breslow (1–2)		45,455	18–19
38	May 17	@ Yankees	3–2 (10)	Aceves (2–0)	Crain (2–2)		44,804	18–20
39	May 18	@ Yankees	7–6	Pettitte (4–1)	Perkins (1–3)	Coke (1)	43,244	18–21
40	May 19	@ White Sox	6–2	Buehrle (6–1)	Baker (1–5)		26,696	18–22
41	May 20	@ White Sox	7–4	Danks (3–3)	Liriano (2–5)	Jenks (9)	29,044	18–23
42	May 21	@ White Sox	20–1	Blackburn (3–2)	Colón (2–4)		23,048	19–23
43	May 22	Brewers	11–3	Slowey (6–1)	Parra (3–5)		30,297	20–23
44	May 23	Brewers	6–2	Swarzak (1–0)	Looper (4–3)		40,547	21–23
45	May 24	Brewers	6–3	Baker (2–5)	Bush (3–1)		38,959	22–23
46	May 25	Red Sox	6–5	Penny (5–1)	Liriano (2–6)	Papelbon (12)	27,636	22–24
47	May 26	Red Sox	5–2	Blackburn (4–2)	Lester (3–5)	Nathan (7)	20,019	23–24
48	May 27	Red Sox	4–2	Slowey (7–1)	Matsuzaka (0–3)	Nathan (8)	28,221	24–24
49	May 28	Red Sox	3–1	Beckett (5–2)	Swarzak (1–1)	Papelbon (13)	23,958	24–25
50	May 29	@ Rays	5–3	Shields (4–4)	Baker (2–6)	Choate (1)	19,358	24–26
51	May 30	@ Rays	5–2	Price (1–0)	Liriano (2–7)	Choate (2)	36,052	24–27
52	May 31	@ Rays	3–2	Blackburn (5–2)	Garza (4–4)	Nathan (9)	26,579	25–27

June: 15–12

#	Date	Opponent	Score	Win	Loss	Save	Attendance	Record
53	June 2	Indians	4–3	Slowey (8–1)	Huff (0–2)	Nathan (10)	26,530	26–27
54	June 3	Indians	10–1	Lee (3–6)	Swarzak (1–2)		29,336	26–28
55	June 4	Indians	11–3	Baker (3–6)	Carmona (2–6)		20,897	27–28
56	June 5	@ Mariners	2–1 (10)	Guerrier (2–0)	Lowe (0–3)	Nathan (11)	35,808	28–28
57	June 6	@ Mariners	2–1	Jakubauskas (4–5)	Henn (0–1)	Aardsma (9)	30,600	28–29
58	June 7	@ Mariners	4–2	Bédard (5–2)	Slowey (8–2)	White (1)	37,714	28–30
59	June 8	@ Athletics	4–3	Outman (4–0)	Ayala (1–2)	Bailey (5)	10,181	28–31
60	June 9	@ Athletics	10–5	Baker (4–6)	Anderson (3–6)	Nathan (12)	10,127	29–31
61	June 10	@ Athletics	6–3	Guerrier (3–0)	Bailey (4–1)	Nathan (13)	18,074	30–31
62	June 11	@ Athletics	4–3	Ziegler (1–1)	Henn (0–2)		13,383	30–32
63	June 12	@ Cubs	7–4	Slowey (9–2)	Wells (0–3)	Nathan (14)	41,509	31–32
64	June 13	@ Cubs	2–0	Swarzak (2–2)	Harden (4–3)	Nathan (15)	40,899	32–32
65	June 14	@ Cubs	3–2	Mármol (2–1)	Crain (2–3)		40,814	32–33
66	June 16	Pirates	8–2	Perkins (2–3)	Maholm (4–3)		25,351	33–33
67	June 17	Pirates	8–2	Snell (2–7)	Liriano (2–8)		30,057	33–34
68	June 18	Pirates	5–1	Blackburn (6–2)	Duke (7–5)		30,670	34–34
69	June 19	Astros	5–2	Slowey (10–2)	Oswalt (3–4)	Nathan (16)	32,218	35–34
70	June 20	Astros	6–5	Moehler (4–4)	Henn (0–3)	Valverde (4)	34,710	35–35
71	June 21	Astros	5–1	Rodríguez (6–6)	Perkins (2–4)	Valverde (5)	39,659	35–36
72	June 23	@ Brewers	7–3	Liriano (3–8)	Suppan (5–5)		42,008	36–36
73	June 24	@ Brewers	4–3	Coffey (3–1)	Blackburn (6–3)	Hoffman (17)	34,480	36–37
74	June 25	@ Brewers	6–4	Baker (5–6)	Burns (0–1)	Nathan (17)	40,524	37–37
75	June 26	@ Cardinals	3–1	Perkins (3–4)	Wainwright (8–5)	Nathan (18)	44,159	38–37
76	June 27	@ Cardinals	5–3	Kinney (1–0)	Slowey (10–3)	Franklin (18)	42,986	38–38
77	June 28	@ Cardinals	6–2	Liriano (4–8)	Piñeiro (6–9)	Nathan (19)	42,705	39–38
78	June 29	@ Royals	4–2	Hochevar (3–3)	Blackburn (6–4)	Soria (10)	22,066	39–39
79	June 30	@ Royals	2–1	Baker (6–6)	Bannister (5–6)	Nathan (20)	19,310	40–39

July: 12–12

#	Date	Opponent	Score	Win	Loss	Save	Attendance	Record
80	July 1	@ Royals	5–1	Perkins (4–4)	Meche (4–8)	Nathan (21)	18,906	41–39
81	July 3	Tigers	11–9 (16)	Dolsi (1–0)	Dickey (1–1)		33,368	41–40
82	July 4	Tigers	4–3	Guerrier (4–0)	Lyon (3–4)	Nathan (22)	27,238	42–40
83	July 5	Tigers	6–2	Blackburn (7–4)	Porcello (8–6)		33,274	43–40
84	July 7	Yankees	10–2	Sabathia (8–5)	Baker (6–7)		29,540	43–41
85	July 8	Yankees	4–3	Burnett (8–4)	Swarzak (2–3)	Rivera (22)	38,115	43–42
86	July 9	Yankees	6–4	Albaladejo (4–1)	Liriano (4–9)	Rivera (23)	29,628	43–43
87	July 10	White Sox	6–4	Blackburn (8–4)	Dotel (1–3)	Nathan (23)	29,628	44–43
88	July 11	White Sox	8–7	Floyd (7–6)	Perkins (4–5)	Jenks (20)	41,146	44–44
89	July 12	White Sox	13–7	Baker (7–7)	Buehrle (9–3)		36,254	45–44
90	July 17	@ Rangers	5–3	Perkins (5–5)	Padilla (7–5)	Nathan (24)	34,662	46–44
91	July 18	@ Rangers	4–1	Baker (8–7)	Feldman (8–3)	Nathan (25)	31,041	47–44
92	July 19	@ Rangers	5–3 (12)	Nippert (1–0)	Duensing (0–1)		27,204	47–45
93	July 20	@ Athletics	14–13	Breslow (3–4)	Mijares (0–2)	Wuertz (3)	10,283	47–46
94	July 21	@ Athletics	3–2 (10)	Guerrier (5–0)	Bailey (4–3)	Nathan (26)	12,027	48–46
95	July 22	@ Athletics	16–1	Cahill (6–8)	Perkins (5–6)		22,031	48–47
96	July 23	@ Angels	6–5 (10)	Fuentes (1–2)	Crain (2–4)		38,145	48–48
97	July 24	@ Angels	6–3	Lackey (6–4)	Liriano (4–10)		39,272	48–49
98	July 25	@ Angels	11–5	Palmer (8–1)	Blackburn (8–5)		35,922	48–50
99	July 26	@ Angels	10–1	Swarzak (3–3)	Santana (3–6)		36,386	49–50
100	July 27	White Sox	4–3	Perkins (6–6)	Danks (8–7)	Nathan (27)	32,354	50–50
101	July 28	White Sox	5–3	Mijares (1–2)	Beuhrle (11–4)	Nathan (28)	34,642	51–50
102	July 29	White Sox	3–2	Crain (3–4)	Contreras (4–10)	Nathan (29)	39,002	52–50
103	July 31	Angels	11 – 5 (11)	Jepsen (3–2)	Keppel (0–1)		31,767	52–51

August: 14–14

#	Date	Opponent	Score	Win	Loss	Save	Attendance	Record
104	August 1	Angels	11–6	Saunders (9–6)	Swarzak (3–4)		40,828	52–52
105	August 2	Angels	13–4	Weaver (11–3)	Perkins (6–7)		41,079	52–53
106	August 4	@ Indians	10–1	Baker (9–7)	Huff (5–6)		17,518	53–53
107	August 5	@ Indians	8–1	Laffey (5–3)	Liriano (4–11)		17,683	53–54
108	August 6	@ Indians	2–1	Sipp (2–0)	Blackburn (8–6)	Wood (15)	21,657	53–55
109	August 7	@ Tigers	10–8	Galarraga (6–10)	Swarzak (3–5)		36,444	53–56
110	August 8	@ Tigers	11–0	Pavano (10–8)	Verlander (12–6)		39,685	54–56
111	August 9	@ Tigers	8–7	Lyon (5–4)	Guerrier (5–1)	Rodney (23)	35,423	54–57
112	August 11	Royals	14–6	Davies (4–8)	Blackburn (8–7)		32,121	54–58
113	August 12	Royals	7–1	Liriano (5–11)	Bannister (7–9)		30,105	55–58
114	August 13	Royals	5–4	Meche (5–9)	Pavano (10–9)	Soria (19)	32,373	55–59
115	August 14	Indians	11–0	Baker (10–7)	Masterson (3–4)		34,845	56–59
116	August 15	Indians	7–3	Huff (7–6)	Swarzak (3–6)		33,931	56–60
117	August 16	Indians	7–4	Laffey (7–3)	Blackburn (8–8)		30,260	56–61
118	August 17	@ Rangers	8–5	Hunter (6–2)	Liriano (5–12)	Francisco (18)	17,940	56–62
119	August 18	@ Rangers	9–6	Crain (4–4)	Jennings (2–4)	Nathan (30)	20,931	57–62
120	August 19	@ Rangers	5–4	Baker (11–7)	Millwood (9–8)	Nathan (31)	33,479	58–62
121	August 20	@ Rangers	11–1	Holland (7–7)	Swarzak (3–7)		21,870	58–63
122	August 21	@ Royals	5–4	Nathan (2–1)	Soria (3–1)		22,283	59–63
123	August 22	@ Royals	8–7	Duensing (1–1)	Davies (4–9)	Guerrier (1)	33,811	60–63
124	August 23	@ Royals	10–3	Pavano (11–9)	Bannister (7–10)		18,680	61–63
125	August 24	Orioles	2–1	Baker (12–7)	Tillman (1–2)	Nathan (32)	20,271	62–63
126	August 25	Orioles	7–6	Mijares (2–2)	Mickolio (0–1)		23,696	63–63
127	August 26	Orioles	5–1	Guthrie (9–12)	Blackburn (8–9)		28,446	63–64
128	August 28	Rangers	3–2	Duensing (2–1)	Hunter (6–3)	Nathan (33)	21,641	64–64
129	August 29	Rangers	3–0	Feldman (14–4)	Pavano (11–10)	Francisco (19)	28,516	64–65
130	August 30	Rangers	5–3	Rauch (1–0)	Wilson (4–6)	Nathan (34)	29,282	65–65
131	August 31	White Sox	4–1	Blackburn (9–9)	Floyd (10–9)	Nathan (35)	19,426	66–65

September: 17–11

#	Date	Opponent	Score	Win	Loss	Save	Attendance	Record
132	September 1	White Sox	4–3	Rauch (2–0)	Thornton (6–3)		22,599	67–65
133	September 2	White Sox	4–2	Carrasco (5–1)	Nathan (2–2)	Jenks (28)	21,007	67–66
134	September 4	@ Indians	5–2	Sowers (6–9)	Pavano (10–11)	Wood (18)	24,402	67–67
135	September 5	@ Indians	4–1	Baker (13–7)	Masterson (4–7)	Nathan (36)	19,455	68–67
136	September 6	@ Indians	3–1	Huff (9–7)	Blackburn (9–10)	Wood (19)	17,911	68–68
137	September 7	@ Blue Jays	6–3	Crain (5–4)	Richmond (6–9)	Nathan (37)	13,153	69–68
138	September 8	@ Blue Jays	6–3	Romero (12–7)	Rauch (2–1)	Frasor (7)	13,488	69–69
139	September 9	@ Blue Jays	4–1	Pavano (12–11)	Halladay (13–9)	Nathan (38)	11,159	70–69
140	September 10	@ Blue Jays	3–2	Cecil (7–4)	Baker (13–8)	Frasor (8)	11,461	70–70
141	September 11	Athletics	12–5	Mortensen (1–2)	Blackburn (9–11)		21,084	70–71
142	September 12	Athletics	4–2	Anderson (9–10)	Manship (0–1)	Bailey (24)	24,283	70–72
143	September 13	Athletics	8–0	Duensing (3–1)	Gonzalez (5–6)		21,850	71–72
144	September 14	Indians	6–3	Mahay (2–1)	C. Perez (0–1)	Nathan (39)	20,640	72–72
145	September 15	Indians	5–4	Rauch (3–1)	Carmona (3–11)	Nathan (40)	19,035	73–72
146	September 16	Indians	7–3	Blackburn (10–11)	Laffey (7–6)	Nathan (41)	16,921	74–72
147	September 18	Tigers	3–0	Duensing (4–1)	Porcello (13–9)	Nathan (42)	32,693	75–72
148	September 19	Tigers	6–2	Crain (6–4)	Verlander (16–9)		43,338	76–72
149	September 20	Tigers	6–2	Robertson (2–2)	Baker (13–9)		36,335	76–73
150	September 21	@ White Sox	7–0	Blackburn (11–11)	Hudson (0–1)		26,541	77–73
151	September 22	@ White Sox	8–6	Crain (7–4)	Danks (12–10)	Nathan (43)	25,290	78–73
152	September 23	@ White Sox	8–6	Duensing (5–1)	Buehrle (12–10)	Nathan (44)	26,097	79–73
153	September 25	@ Royals	9–4	Pavano (13–11)	Tejeda (4–2)		23,307	80–73
154	September 26	@ Royals	11–6	Baker (14–9)	DiNardo (0–2)		30,690	81–73
155	September 27	@ Royals	4–1	Greinke (16–8)	Liriano (5–13)	Soria (29)	28,721	81–74
	September 28	@ Tigers	Postponed (rain); rescheduled for September 29					
156	September 29	@ Tigers	3–2	Rauch (4–1)	Lyon (6–5)	Nathan (45)	35,243	82–74
157	September 29	@ Tigers	6–5	Verlander (18–9)	Duensing (5–2)	Rodney (36)	30,240	82–75
158	September 30	@ Tigers	7–2	Bonine (1–1)	Pavano (13–12)		34,775	82–76

October: 5–0

#	Date	Opponent	Score	Win	Loss	Save	Attendance	Record
159	October 1	@ Tigers	8–3	Baker (15–9)	Robertson (2–3)		40,533	83–76
160	October 2	Royals	10–7	Manship (1–1)	DiNardo (0–3)	Nathan (46)	40,223	84–76
161	October 3	Royals	5–4	Rauch (5–1)	Hughes (0–2)	Nathan (47)	48,644	85–76
162	October 4	Royals	13–4	Pavano (14–12)	Hochevar (7–13)		51,155	86–76
163	October 6	Tigers*	6–5 (12)	Keppel (1–1)	Rodney (2–5)		54,088	87–76
*AL Central tiebreaker.

American League Division Series

#	Date	Opponent	Score	Win	Loss	Save	Attendance	Record
1	October 7	@ Yankees	7–2	Sabathia (1–0)	Duensing (0–1)		49,484	0–1
2	October 9	@ Yankees	4–3 (12)	Robertson (1–0)	Mijares (0–1)		50,006	0–2
3	October 11	Yankees	4–1	Pettitte (1–0)	Pavano (0–1)	Rivera (1)	54,735	0–3

== Tie-breaker & postseason ==
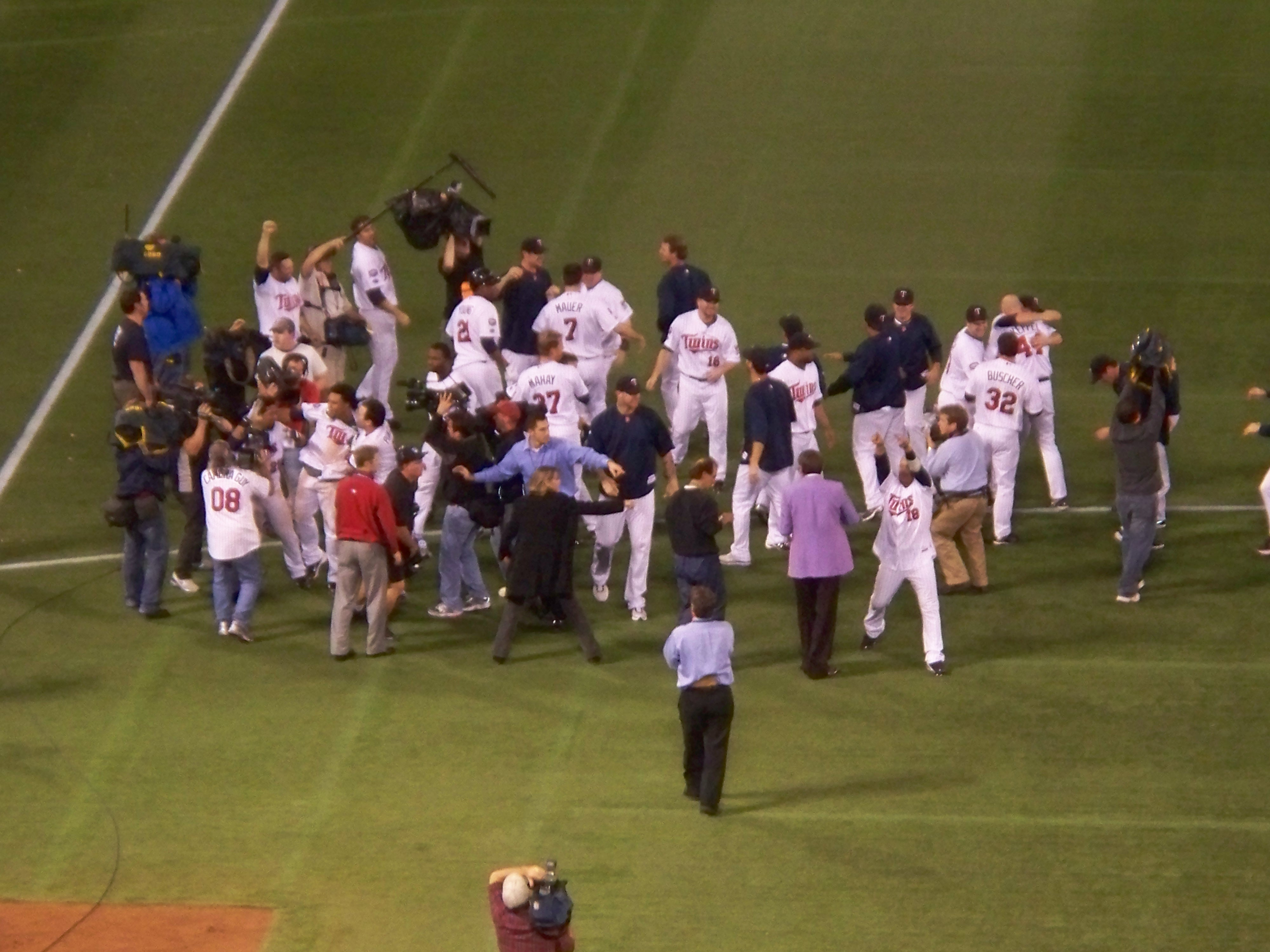
Minnesota Twins celebrate division tiebreaker victory over the Detroit Tigers.

The Twins ended the 162-game regular season tied with the Detroit Tigers, necessitating a one-game playoff. This made the Twins the first major league team ever to play in a tie-breaker two years in a row (they lost one to the Chicago White Sox in 2008). The game took place on Tuesday, October 6 at the Metrodome. The Twins won the game, 6–5, in 12 innings on Alexi Casilla's game-winning hit scoring Carlos Gómez.

The Twins went on to face the New York Yankees in the American League Division Series, which they lost in three consecutive games.

== Player stats ==
=== Batting ===
==== Regular season ====
Note: G = Games played; AB = At bats; R = Runs scored; H = Hits; 2B = Doubles; 3B = Triples; HR = Home runs; RBI = Runs batted in; AVG = Batting average; SB = Stolen bases

Player	G	AB	R	H	2B	3B	HR	RBI	AVG	SB
Luis Ayala	3	0	0	0	0	0	0	0	—	0
Scott Baker	2	6	0	0	0	0	0	0	.000	0
Nick Blackburn	1	4	0	0	0	0	0	0	.000	0
Brian Buscher	61	136	14	32	3	1	2	12	.235	0
Orlando Cabrera	59	242	42	70	13	3	5	36	.289	2
Alexi Casilla	80	228	25	46	7	3	0	17	.202	11
Jesse Crain	1	0	0	0	0	0	0	0	—	0
Joe Crede	90	333	42	75	16	1	15	48	.225	0
Michael Cuddyer	153	588	93	162	34	7	32	94	.276	6
R. A. Dickey	4	0	0	0	0	0	0	0	—	0
Carlos Gómez	137	315	51	72	15	5	3	28	.229	14
Matt Guerrier	7	0	0	0	0	0	0	0	—	0
Brendan Harris	123	414	44	108	22	1	6	37	.261	0
Sean Henn	3	0	0	0	0	0	0	0	—	0
Justin Huber	1	2	0	1	0	0	0	0	.500	0
Bob Keppel	2	0	0	0	0	0	0	0	—	0
Jason Kubel	146	514	73	154	35	2	28	103	.300	1
Francisco Liriano	2	5	0	0	0	0	0	0	.000	0
Joe Mauer	138	523	94	191	30	1	28	96	.365	4
José Mijares	3	0	0	0	0	0	0	0	—	0
Jose Morales	54	119	14	37	6	0	0	7	.311	0
Justin Morneau	135	508	85	139	31	1	30	100	.274	0
Joe Nathan	8	0	0	0	0	0	0	0	—	0
Glen Perkins	1	1	0	0	0	0	0	0	.000	0
Jason Pridie	1	0	0	0	0	0	0	0	—	0
Nick Punto	125	359	56	82	15	1	1	38	.228	16
Mike Redmond	45	135	9	32	5	1	0	7	.237	0
Kevin Slowey	2	3	0	0	0	0	0	0	.000	0
Denard Span	145	578	97	180	16	10	8	68	.311	23
Anthony Swarzak	1	2	0	0	0	0	0	0	.000	0
Matt Tolbert	71	198	28	46	7	1	2	19	.232	6
Delmon Young	108	395	50	112	16	2	12	60	.284	2
Pitcher totals	163	21	0	0	0	0	0	0	.000	0
Team totals	163	5608	817	1539	271	40	172	770	.274	85

==== Postseason ====
Note: G = Games played; AB = At bats; R = Runs scored; H = Hits; 2B = Doubles; 3B = Triples; HR = Home runs; RBI = Runs batted in; AVG = Batting average; SB = Stolen bases

Player	G	AB	R	H	2B	3B	HR	RBI	AVG	SB
Orlando Cabrera	3	13	1	2	0	0	0	0	.154	1
Michael Cuddyer	3	14	0	6	0	0	0	1	.429	0
Carlos Gómez	1	4	1	0	0	0	0	0	.000	0
Brendan Harris	3	12	1	3	0	1	0	1	.250	0
Jason Kubel	3	14	0	1	0	0	0	0	.071	0
Joe Mauer	3	12	1	5	1	0	0	1	.417	0
Jose Morales	1	3	0	0	0	0	0	0	.000	0
Nick Punto	3	9	0	4	1	0	0	1	.444	0
Denard Span	3	15	1	6	1	0	0	1	.400	1
Matt Tolbert	2	5	0	1	0	0	0	0	.200	0
Delmon Young	3	12	1	1	1	0	0	0	.083	1
Totals	3	113	6	29	4	1	0	5	.257	3

=== Pitching ===
==== Regular season ====
Note: W = Wins; L = Losses; ERA = Earned run average; G = Games pitched; GS = Games started; SV = Saves; IP = Innings pitched; R = Runs allowed; ER = Earned runs allowed; BB = Walks allowed; K = Strikeouts

Player	W	L	ERA	G	GS	SV	IP	R	ER	BB	K
Luis Ayala	1	2	4.18	28	0	0	32.1	18	15	8	21
Scott Baker	15	9	4.37	33	33	0	200.0	99	97	48	162
Nick Blackburn	11	11	4.03	33	33	0	205.2	103	92	41	98
Craig Breslow	1	2	6.28	17	0	0	14.1	11	10	11	11
Jesse Crain	7	4	4.70	56	0	0	51.2	28	27	27	43
R. A. Dickey	1	1	4.62	35	1	0	64.1	34	33	30	42
Brian Duensing	5	2	3.64	24	9	0	84.0	37	34	31	53
Armando Gabino	0	0	17.18	2	1	0	3.2	7	7	5	2
Matt Guerrier	5	1	2.36	79	0	1	76.1	23	20	16	47
Sean Henn	0	3	7.15	14	0	0	11.1	9	9	8	9
Philip Humber	0	0	8.00	8	0	0	9.0	8	8	9	9
Bob Keppel	1	1	4.83	37	0	0	54.0	30	29	21	32
Francisco Liriano	5	13	5.80	29	24	0	136.2	93	88	65	122
Ron Mahay	1	0	2.00	16	0	0	9.0	3	2	3	8
Jeff Manship	1	1	5.68	11	5	0	31.2	21	20	15	21
José Mijares	2	2	2.34	71	0	0	61.2	17	16	23	55
Juan Morillo	0	0	22.50	3	0	0	2.0	5	5	3	1
Kevin Mulvey	0	0	27.00	2	0	0	1.1	4	4	0	0
Joe Nathan	2	2	2.10	70	0	47	68.2	16	16	22	89
Carl Pavano	5	4	4.64	12	12	0	73.2	39	38	16	59
Glen Perkins	6	7	5.89	18	17	0	96.1	64	63	23	45
Jon Rauch	5	1	1.72	17	0	0	15.2	3	3	6	14
Kevin Slowey	10	3	4.86	16	16	0	90.2	50	49	15	75
Anthony Swarzak	3	7	6.25	12	12	0	59.0	43	41	20	34
Team totals	87	76	4.50	163	163	48	1453.0	765	726	466	1052

==== Postseason ====
Note: W = Wins; L = Losses; ERA = Earned run average; G = Games pitched; GS = Games started; SV = Saves; IP = Innings pitched; R = Runs allowed; ER = Earned runs allowed; BB = Walks allowed; K = Strikeouts

Player	W	L	ERA	G	GS	SV	IP	R	ER	BB	K
Nick Blackburn	0	0	1.59	1	1	0	5.2	1	1	2	3
Brian Duensing	0	1	9.64	1	1	0	4.2	5	5	1	3
Matt Guerrier	0	0	0.00	2	0	0	2.0	0	0	0	2
Francisco Liriano	0	0	4.50	1	0	0	2.0	2	1	1	1
Ron Mahay	0	0	5.40	3	0	0	1.2	1	1	1	2
José Mijares	0	1	13.50	2	0	0	0.2	1	1	1	0
Joe Nathan	0	0	9.00	2	0	0	2.0	2	2	1	2
Carl Pavano	0	1	2.57	1	1	0	7.0	2	2	0	9
Jon Rauch	0	0	6.75	3	0	0	1.1	1	1	2	0
Totals	0	3	4.67	3	3	0	27.0	15	14	9	22

== Other post-season awards ==
- Calvin R. Griffith Award (Most Valuable Twin) – Joe Mauer
- Joseph W. Haynes Award (Twins Pitcher of the Year) – Joe Nathan
- Bill Boni Award (Twins Outstanding Rookie) – José Mijares
- Charles O. Johnson Award (Most Improved Twin) – Michael Cuddyer
- Dick Siebert Award (Upper Midwest Player of the Year) – Joe Mauer
- Bob Allison Award (Leadership Award) – Michael Cuddyer
- Mike Augustin Award ("Media Good Guy" Award) – Denard Span
  - The above awards are voted on by the Twin Cities chapter of the BBWAA
- Carl R. Pohlad Award (Outstanding Community Service) – Justin Morneau
- Sherry Robertson Award (Twins Outstanding Farm System Position Player) – Ben Revere
- Jim Rantz Award (Twins Outstanding Farm System Pitcher) – David Bromberg
- Kirby Puckett Award (Alumni Community Service) – Rod Carew
- Herb Carneal Award (Lifetime Achievement Award) – Jerry Bell

== Farm system ==
Level	Team	League	Manager
AAA	Rochester Red Wings	International League	Stan Cliburn
AA	New Britain Rock Cats	Eastern League	Tom Nieto
A	Fort Myers Miracle	Florida State League	Jeff Smith
A	Beloit Snappers	Midwest League	Nelson Prada
Rookie	Elizabethton Twins	Appalachian League	Ray Smith
Rookie	GCL Twins	Gulf Coast League	Jake Mauer
