= 2009 American League Division Series =

Teams
Team (Wins)		Manager	Season
New York Yankees (3)		Joe Girardi	103–59 (.636), GA: 8
Minnesota Twins (0)		Ron Gardenhire	87–76 (.534), GA: 1
- Dates: October 7–11
- Television: TBS
- TV announcers: Chip Caray, Ron Darling, and Craig Sager
- Radio: ESPN
- Radio announcers: Jon Miller and Steve Phillips
- Umpires: Tim Tschida, Chuck Meriwether, Mark Wegner, Paul Emmel, Jim Joyce, and Phil Cuzzi

Teams
Team (Wins)		Manager	Season
Los Angeles Angels of Anaheim (3)		Mike Scioscia	97–65 (.599), GA: 10
Boston Red Sox (0)		Terry Francona	95–67 (.586), GB: 8
- Dates: October 8–11
- Television: TBS
- TV announcers: Don Orsillo and Buck Martinez
- Radio: ESPN
- Radio announcers: Dan Shulman and Dave Campbell
- Umpires: Joe West, C.B. Bucknor, Eric Cooper, Greg Gibson, Brian Gorman, and Dan Iassogna

The 2009 American League Division Series (ALDS) consisted of two concurrent best-of-five playoff series in Major League Baseball’s (MLB) 2009 postseason that determined the participating teams in the 2009 American League Championship Series. Three divisional winners and a "wild card" team played in the two series. The ALDS began on Wednesday, October 7, 2009, and ended on Sunday, October 11, 2009.

Under MLB's playoff format, no two teams from the same division were matched up in the Division Series, regardless of whether their records would normally indicate such a matchup. Home field advantage went to the team with the better regular-season record with the exception of the wild card team, which defers home field advantage regardless of record. The matchups were:

- (1) New York Yankees (AL East champions) vs. (3) Minnesota Twins (AL Central champions): Yankees won the series, 3–0.
- (2) Los Angeles Angels of Anaheim (AL West champions) vs. (4) Boston Red Sox (Wild Card qualifier): Angels won the series, 3–0.

The Twins and Detroit Tigers finished the 162-game schedule in a first-place tie atop the American League Central and played a one-game playoff at the Metrodome on Tuesday, October 6, 2009, that was won by the Twins, 6–5, in 12 innings, giving them the division championship and a postseason berth.

The Yankees, by virtue of finishing with the best record in the American League, were given the choice of playing an eight-day series (with three off-days) or a seven-day series (with two off-days) and opted for the former.

This is the third consecutive season—and the fourth since 2004—that the Angels and Red Sox have met in the ALDS. The Red Sox swept the Angels in 2004 and 2007, and defeated the Angels 3–1 in 2008. The Twins and Yankees last met in the postseason in the 2004 ALDS, which the Yankees won 3–1.

The Angels and Yankees each swept their respective series in three games. Since the advent of division series play in 1995, this was the first time that the winners of both divisional series swept their opponents (Royals and Orioles swept both of their ALDS series in 2014, defeating the Angels and Tigers respectively). The Yankees went on to defeat the Angels 4–2 in the ALCS, and defeated the Philadelphia Phillies 4–2 to win the 2009 World Series.

Game 3 of the Twins–Yankees series was the final Major League Baseball game at the Metrodome, as the Twins moved into their new home stadium, Target Field, starting with the 2010 season.

TBS carried the tie breaker game and also televised all Division Series games in the United States.

== Matchups ==
=== New York Yankees vs. Minnesota Twins ===
New York won the series, 3–0.

Game	Date	Score	Location	Time	Attendance
1	October 7	Minnesota Twins – 2, New York Yankees – 7	Yankee Stadium	3:38	49,464
2	October 9	Minnesota Twins – 3, New York Yankees – 4 (11)	Yankee Stadium	4:22	50,006
3	October 11	New York Yankees – 4, Minnesota Twins – 1	Hubert H. Humphrey Metrodome	3:25	54,735

=== Los Angeles Angels of Anaheim vs. Boston Red Sox ===
Los Angeles won the series, 3–0.

Game	Date	Score	Location	Time	Attendance
1	October 8	Boston Red Sox – 0, Los Angeles Angels of Anaheim – 5	Angel Stadium of Anaheim	3:09	45,070
2	October 9	Boston Red Sox – 1, Los Angeles Angels of Anaheim – 4	Angel Stadium of Anaheim	3:11	45,223
3	October 11	Los Angeles Angels of Anaheim – 7, Boston Red Sox – 6	Fenway Park	3:49	38,704

== New York vs. Minnesota ==
=== Game 1 ===
October 7, 2009 6:07 pm (EDT) at Yankee Stadium in Bronx, New York 62 °F (17 °C), partly cloudy
Team	1	2	3	4	5	6	7	8	9	R	H	E
Minnesota	0	0	2	0	0	0	0	0	0	2	10	1
New York	0	0	2	1	3	0	1	0	X	7	9	0
WP: CC Sabathia (1–0) LP: Brian Duensing (0–1); Home runs: MIN: None; NYY: Derek Jeter (1), Hideki Matsui (1); Attendance: 49,464; Boxscore

In the first postseason game at the new Yankee Stadium, the Yankees rebounded from an early 2–0 deficit to take the first game of the series, 7–2, behind a strong outing from CC Sabathia and timely hitting by Derek Jeter, Nick Swisher, Alex Rodriguez, and Hideki Matsui. The Twins opened the scoring in the third by stringing together three consecutive two-out hits, including an RBI single by Michael Cuddyer. One batter later, a passed ball by Jorge Posada enabled Joe Mauer to score from third, giving the Twins a 2–0 lead. The Yankees answered in the bottom of the inning when Jeter smashed a two-run home run into the left field seats, and in the fourth, a two-out RBI double off the bat of Swisher put the Yankees in front for the first time of the night. One inning later, Rodriguez broke an 0-for-29 postseason skid with runners on base (dating back to the 2004 ALCS) by lining a two-out single to left center, scoring Jeter from second and knocking Twins starter Brian Duensing out of the game. Matsui then belted a two-run home run into Monument Park off reliever Francisco Liriano, making it 6–2 Yankees. Rodriguez added another RBI single in the seventh off of John Rauch with the run charged to Liriano to complete the scoring. Sabathia settled down after the third inning, striking out eight and limiting the Twins to two runs (one earned) and eight hits in 6 2/3 innings of work. The Yankees bullpen then combined for 2 1/3 innings of scoreless relief.

=== Game 2 ===
October 9, 2009 6:07 pm (EDT) at Yankee Stadium in Bronx, New York 68 °F (20 °C), cloudy
Team	1	2	3	4	5	6	7	8	9	10	11	R	H	E
Minnesota	0	0	0	0	0	1	0	2	0	0	0	3	12	1
New York	0	0	0	0	0	1	0	0	2	0	1	4	7	0
WP: David Robertson (1–0) LP: José Mijares (0–1); Home runs: MIN: None; NYY: Alex Rodriguez (1), Mark Teixeira (1); Attendance: 50,006; Boxscore

Late-game heroics from Alex Rodriguez and Mark Teixeira powered the Yankees past the Twins in Game 2 for a commanding two-games-to-none series lead. The Twins' Nick Blackburn and Yankees' A. J. Burnett pitched five shutout innings each before Delmon Young walked with one out in the top of the sixth, stole second and scored on Brendan Harris's triple, but the Yankees tied the score in the bottom of the inning on Rodriguez's RBI single off of Blackburn. In the eighth, Phil Hughes allowed a two-out walk to Carlos Gomez, who moved to third on Harris's single and scored on Nick Punto's single. Mariano Rivera relieved Hughes and allowed an RBI single to Denard Span. With the Yankees trailing 3–1 in the bottom of the ninth, Teixeira led off with a single off Twins closer Joe Nathan, and Rodriguez followed with a dramatic game-tying two-run home run into the Yankee bullpen in right center. The Yankees threatened to win the game in the tenth, putting runners on first and third with one out, but Johnny Damon lined out to shortstop Orlando Cabrera and Brett Gardner was doubled off third to end the inning. In the top of the 11th the Twins mounted a threat of their own, beginning with a Joe Mauer base hit later in an at-bat in which he had already been denied a ground-rule double on a blown call by left field umpire Phil Cuzzi, who erroneously called Mauer's drive down the left field line foul. Replays showed the ball landed inside the foul line in fair territory. Two subsequent Twins hits moved baserunners up a single base and loaded the bases with nobody out, meaning that Cuzzi's officiating error possibly cost the Twins a run. Yankees reliever David Robertson was able to work out of the jam, bringing the total number of runners left on base by the Twins to 17. That set the stage for Teixeira, who opened the bottom of the frame by lining José Mijares' 2–1 pitch down the line and just over the left field wall for a walk-off home run.

Teixeira's home run was the first of his postseason career and the first postseason walk-off home run by a Yankee since Aaron Boone's series-winner in Game 7 of the 2003 ALCS.

=== Game 3 ===
October 11, 2009 6:07 pm (CDT) at Hubert H. Humphrey Metrodome in Minneapolis, Minnesota 68 °F (20 °C), dome
Team	1	2	3	4	5	6	7	8	9	R	H	E
New York	0	0	0	0	0	0	2	0	2	4	7	0
Minnesota	0	0	0	0	0	1	0	0	0	1	7	0
WP: Andy Pettitte (1–0) LP: Carl Pavano (0–1) Sv: Mariano Rivera (1); Home runs: NYY: Alex Rodriguez (2), Jorge Posada (1); MIN: None; Attendance: 54,735; Boxscore

Starters Carl Pavano and Andy Pettitte matched zeroes until the bottom of the sixth, when Joe Mauer singled off Pettitte with two on to put the Twins ahead 1–0. The Yankees seized the lead half an inning later on a pair of opposite field solo home runs by Alex Rodriguez and Jorge Posada. In the eighth, Nick Punto led off with a double off New York's Phil Hughes and Denard Span followed with an infield single, but Punto made a wide turn around third and was thrown out trying to get back to the bag, effectively ending the threat. In the top of the ninth, Ron Mahay, Jon Rauch and Jose Mijares walked three straight batters with one out before consecutive RBI singles by Jorge Posada and Robinson Cano off of Joe Nathan padded the Yankees' lead to 4–1. Mariano Rivera recorded the final four outs, earning the save and sending the Yankees on to the American League Championship Series in the Twins' final game at the Metrodome.

=== Composite box ===
2009 ALDS (3–0): New York Yankees over Minnesota Twins

Team	1	2	3	4	5	6	7	8	9	10	11	R	H	E
New York Yankees	0	0	2	1	3	1	3	0	4	0	1	15	23	0
Minnesota Twins	0	0	2	0	0	2	0	2	0	0	0	6	29	2
Total attendance: 154,205 Average attendance: 51,402

== Los Angeles vs. Boston ==
=== Game 1 ===
October 8, 2009 6:37 pm (PDT) at Angel Stadium of Anaheim in Anaheim, California 63 °F (17 °C), mostly clear
Team	1	2	3	4	5	6	7	8	9	R	H	E
Boston	0	0	0	0	0	0	0	0	0	0	4	3
Los Angeles	0	0	0	0	3	0	2	0	X	5	7	1
WP: John Lackey (1–0) LP: Jon Lester (0–1); Home runs: BOS: None; LAA: Torii Hunter (1); Attendance: 45,070; Boxscore

Game 1 started off as a pitchers' duel between Los Angeles' John Lackey and Boston's Jon Lester. Each starter gave up four hits; however, one of the hits given up by Lester was a three-run home run by Torii Hunter in the fifth inning that proved to be all the run support Lackey needed. In the seventh, Ramon Ramirez loaded the bases for the Angels on a walk, hit-by-pitch and single with no outs. Takashi Saito in relief allowed a two-out Kendry Morales RBI single that scored Vladimir Guerrero and Juan Rivera. Lackey pitched 7 1/3 shutout innings while Darren Oliver pitched 1 2/3 shutout innings. This was the first time the Red Sox had been shut out in postseason play since Game 2 of the 1995 ALDS, and the first ever shutout by Angels pitching in the postseason.

=== Game 2 ===
October 9, 2009 6:37 pm (PDT) at Angel Stadium of Anaheim in Anaheim, California 62 °F (17 °C), mostly clear
Team	1	2	3	4	5	6	7	8	9	R	H	E
Boston	0	0	0	1	0	0	0	0	0	1	4	0
Los Angeles	0	0	0	1	0	0	3	0	X	4	6	0
WP: Jered Weaver (1–0) LP: Josh Beckett (0–1) Sv: Brian Fuentes (1); Attendance: 45,223; Boxscore

The Red Sox scored their first run of the series when Jacoby Ellsbury tripled to lead off the fourth and scored on Victor Martinez's single. However, they did not score again while the Angels tied the game in the bottom half on Kendrys Morales's sacrifice fly with two on. The Angels broke the tie with three runs in the seventh to hand Josh Beckett his first loss in nine postseason starts since Game 3 of the 2003 World Series. Vladimir Guerrero drew a leadoff walk and pinch runner Howie Kendrick stole second, then Maicer Izturis broke the deadlock with an RBI single and, after Mike Napoli was hit by a pitch, Erick Aybar's two-run triple over center fielder Jacoby Ellsbury's head chased Beckett from the game two batters later. Angels starter Jered Weaver continued in the footsteps of Game 1 starter John Lackey with a masterful performance, striking out seven while limiting the Red Sox offense to one run on two hits and two walks in 7 1/3 innings. Three Angels relievers, Darren Oliver, Kevin Jepsen, and Brian Fuentes finished the game, with Fuentes earning the save.

=== Game 3 ===
October 11, 2009 12:07 pm (EDT) at Fenway Park in Boston, Massachusetts 61 °F (16 °C), mostly sunny
Team	1	2	3	4	5	6	7	8	9	R	H	E
Los Angeles	0	0	0	1	0	1	0	2	3	7	11	0
Boston	0	0	3	2	0	0	0	1	0	6	7	1
WP: Darren Oliver (1–0) LP: Jonathan Papelbon (0–1) Sv: Brian Fuentes (2); Home runs: LAA: Kendrys Morales (1); BOS: J. D. Drew (1); Attendance: 38,704; Boxscore

The Angels stunned the Red Sox and the Fenway crowd with two runs in the eighth and three in the ninth, overcoming late-inning deficits of 5–2 and 6–4 to sweep the series and advance to the American League Championship Series.

Scott Kazmir started for Los Angeles and was largely ineffective, surrendering five runs on five hits and three walks in six innings. The Red Sox struck first in the third when a one-out walk and subsequent single was followed by a two-run double by Dustin Pedroia, who scored on Victor Martinez's single to put them up 3–0. After the Angels got on the board in the fifth on Kendrys Morales's home run, J. D. Drew hit a two-run home run in the bottom half that gave Boston what seemed like a comfortable 5–1 lead. The Angels chipped away against Boston starter Clay Buchholz in the sixth, putting runners on first and third with none out before Kendrys Morales grounded into a run-scoring 5–4–3 double play.

Red Sox reliever Billy Wagner worked into a second-and-third, two-out jam in the eighth, prompting manager Terry Francona to summon Jonathan Papelbon from the bullpen for a four-out save. Juan Rivera greeted Papelbon by lining his first pitch to right center for a two-run single, momentarily making it a 5–4 game, but Boston added an insurance run in the bottom of the inning off of Kevin Jepsen when David Ortiz singled with two outs and was replaced by pinch runner Joey Gathright, who stole second and scored on Mike Lowell's single. Papelbon retired the first two batters in the top of the ninth, but Erick Aybar kept the inning alive with a two-strike single. After Chone Figgins worked a walk, Bobby Abreu, also down to his final strike, doubled off the Green Monster to score Aybar from second. Torii Hunter then received an intentional walk, loading the bases for Vladimir Guerrero. Guerrero ripped Papelbon's first pitch for a two-run single to center, putting the Angels ahead 7–6. Closer Brian Fuentes retired the Red Sox in order in the bottom of the inning for the save.

=== Composite box ===
2009 ALDS (3–0): Los Angeles Angels of Anaheim over Boston Red Sox

Team	1	2	3	4	5	6	7	8	9	R	H	E
Los Angeles Angels of Anaheim	0	0	0	2	3	1	5	2	3	16	24	1
Boston Red Sox	0	0	3	3	0	0	0	1	0	7	15	4
Total attendance: 128,997 Average attendance: 42,999

== See also ==
- 2009 National League Division Series
