= Carlos Gómez (baseball) =

Dominican baseball player (born 1985)

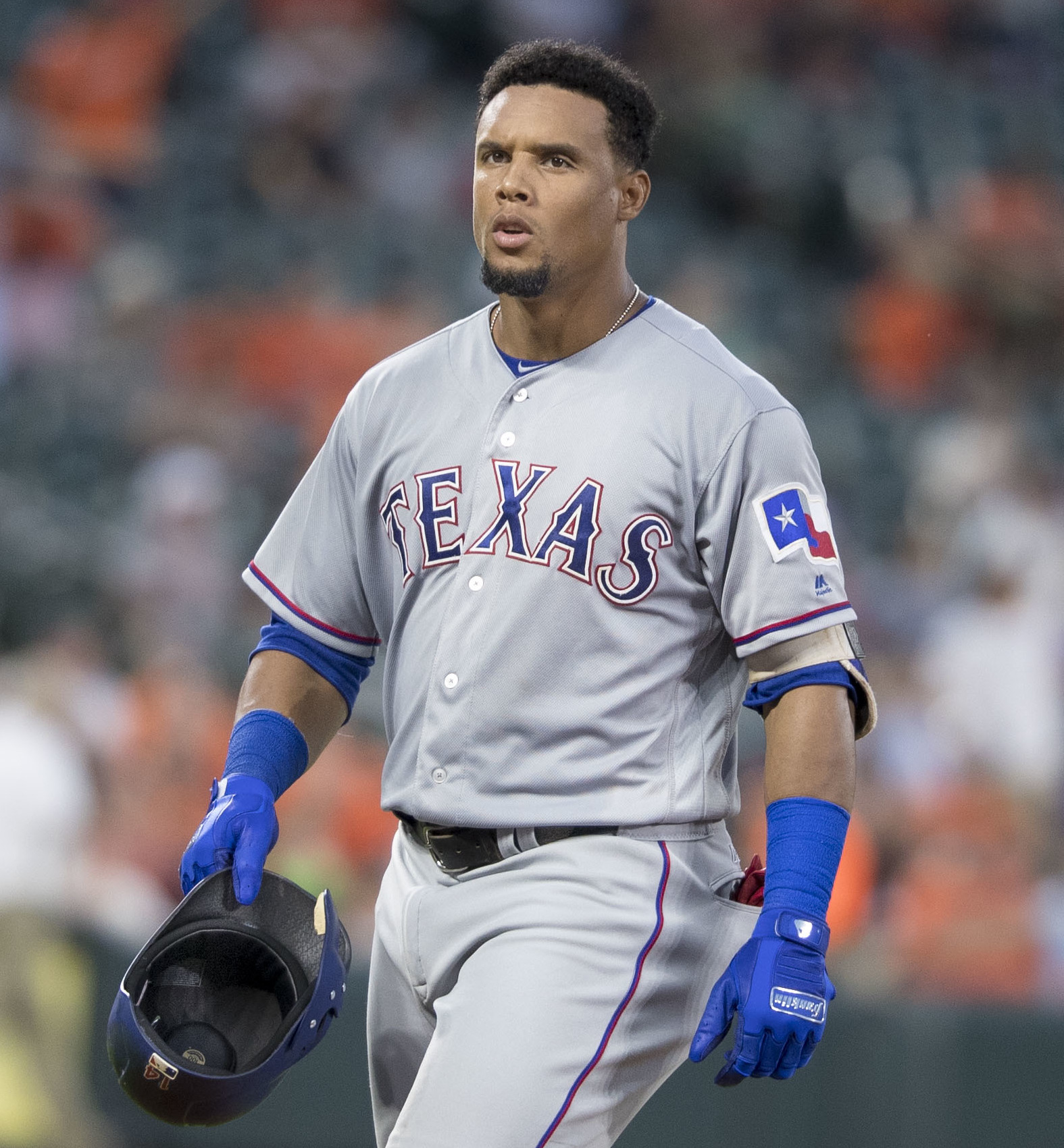
- Gómez with the Texas Rangers in 2017
- Center fielder
- Born: December 4, 1985 (age 40); Santiago, Dominican Republic
- Batted: Right Threw: Right

MLB debut
- May 13, 2007, for the New York Mets

Last MLB appearance
- June 29, 2019, for the New York Mets

MLB statistics
- Batting average: .252
- Home runs: 145
- Runs batted in: 546
- Stats at Baseball Reference

Teams
- New York Mets (2007); Minnesota Twins (2008–2009); Milwaukee Brewers (2010–2015); Houston Astros (2015–2016); Texas Rangers (2016–2017); Tampa Bay Rays (2018); New York Mets (2019)

Career highlights and awards
- 2× All-Star (2013, 2014); Gold Glove Award (2013); Milwaukee Brewers Wall of Honor

Carlos Argelis Gómez Peña, nicknamed Go-Go, (Spanish pronunciation: [ˈkaɾlos ˈɡomes]; born December 4, 1985) is a Dominican former professional baseball outfielder. He played for the New York Mets, Minnesota Twins, Milwaukee Brewers, Houston Astros, Texas Rangers and Tampa Bay Rays. Gómez is a two-time MLB All-Star and a Gold Glove Award winner.

== Professional career ==
=== Minor leagues ===
At just 16 years of age, Gómez signed with the New York Mets as an international free agent on in 2002. Along with Fernando Martínez, Gómez was considered a five-tool prospect and one of their top outfield prospects. While they were teammates, Mets shortstop José Reyes, who led the National League in stolen bases and triples for multiple seasons, said that Gómez was faster than he was. In fact, Gómez routinely would beat him in foot races during spring training.

In 2006, Gómez played for the Double-A Binghamton Mets of the Eastern League and was the co-winner of the Sterling Award. He finished second in the league with 41 stolen bases and fifth with eight triples. He batted .281 (121-for-430) with 53 runs scored, 24 doubles, seven home runs, and 48 runs batted in (RBI) in 120 games.

Gómez started the 2007 season with the Triple-A New Orleans Zephyrs. He led the Pacific Coast League (PCL) with 17 stolen bases by the second week of May. In 36 games, Gómez hit .286 (40-for-140) with 24 runs scored, eight doubles, two triples, and two home runs and 13 RBI.

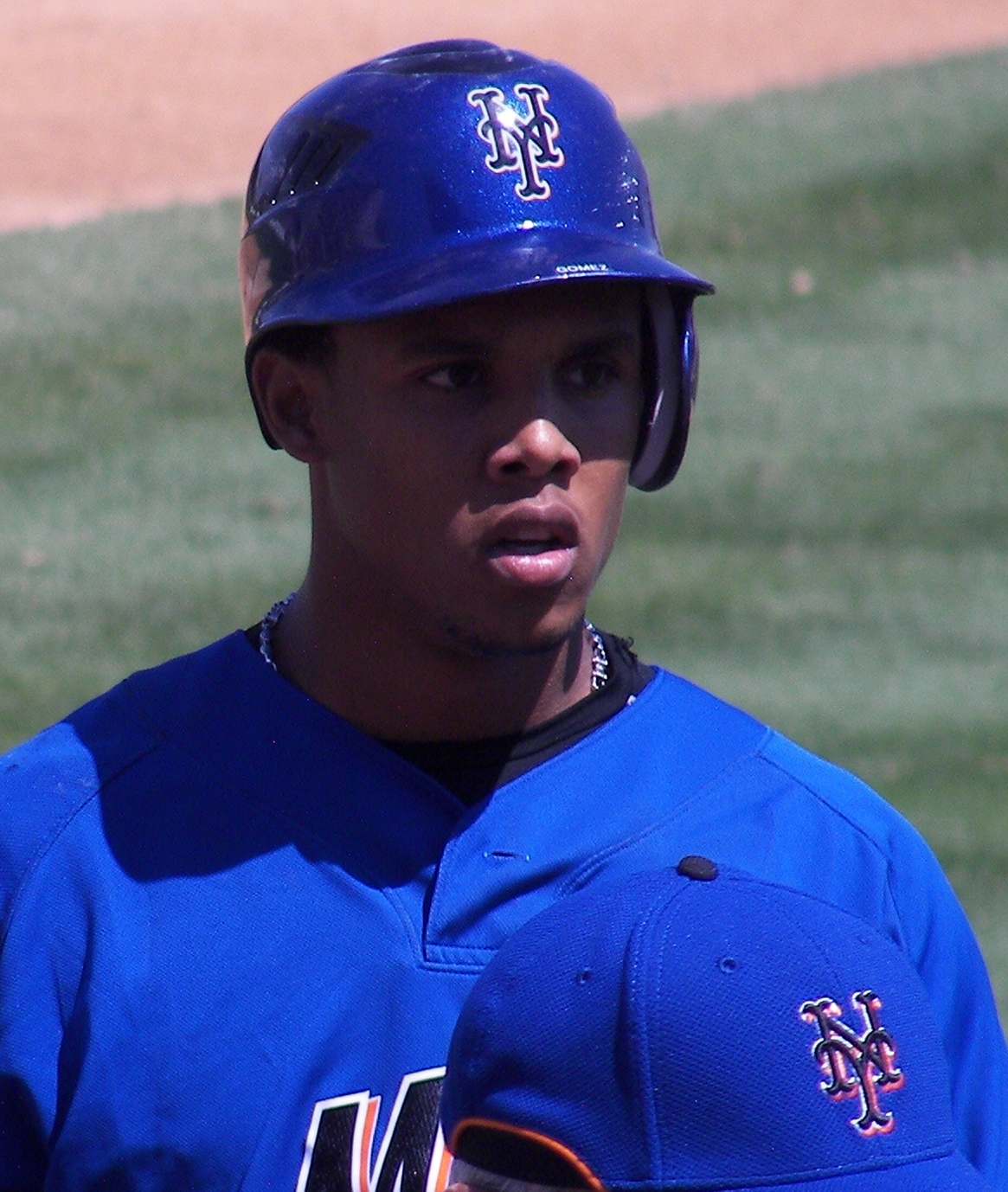
Gómez with the New York Mets in 2007 spring training

=== New York Mets (2007) ===
Gómez made his major league debut with the Mets on May 13, 2007. At 21 years and 205 days old, he became the youngest player in the National League. Gómez went 2-for-4 with two runs scored and a stolen base, helping the Mets to a 9–1 win over the Milwaukee Brewers. On June 10, he hit his first major league home run, a three-run home run off Detroit Tigers pitcher Jason Grilli. In his first MLB season, Gómez played in 58 games and hit .232 with two home runs and 12 RBIs in 139 at bats.

=== Minnesota Twins (2008–2009) ===
When pitcher Johan Santana of the Minnesota Twins became available via trade, the Mets traded Gómez and pitchers Deolis Guerra, Philip Humber and Kevin Mulvey to the Twins to acquire him in January 2008. Gómez became the starting center fielder for the Twins, following Torii Hunter's signing with the Los Angeles Angels. He won a three-way race for center field in 2008, beating out prospects Denard Span and Jason Pridie. Gómez's 40-yard dash time was clocked at 4.29. Twins manager Ron Gardenhire nicknamed Gómez "Go-Go" due to his last name and his blazing speed. With Gómez batting first, and Alexi Casilla batting second, Gardenhire referred to the speedy duo as "Loose Cannon One" and "Loose Cannon Two."

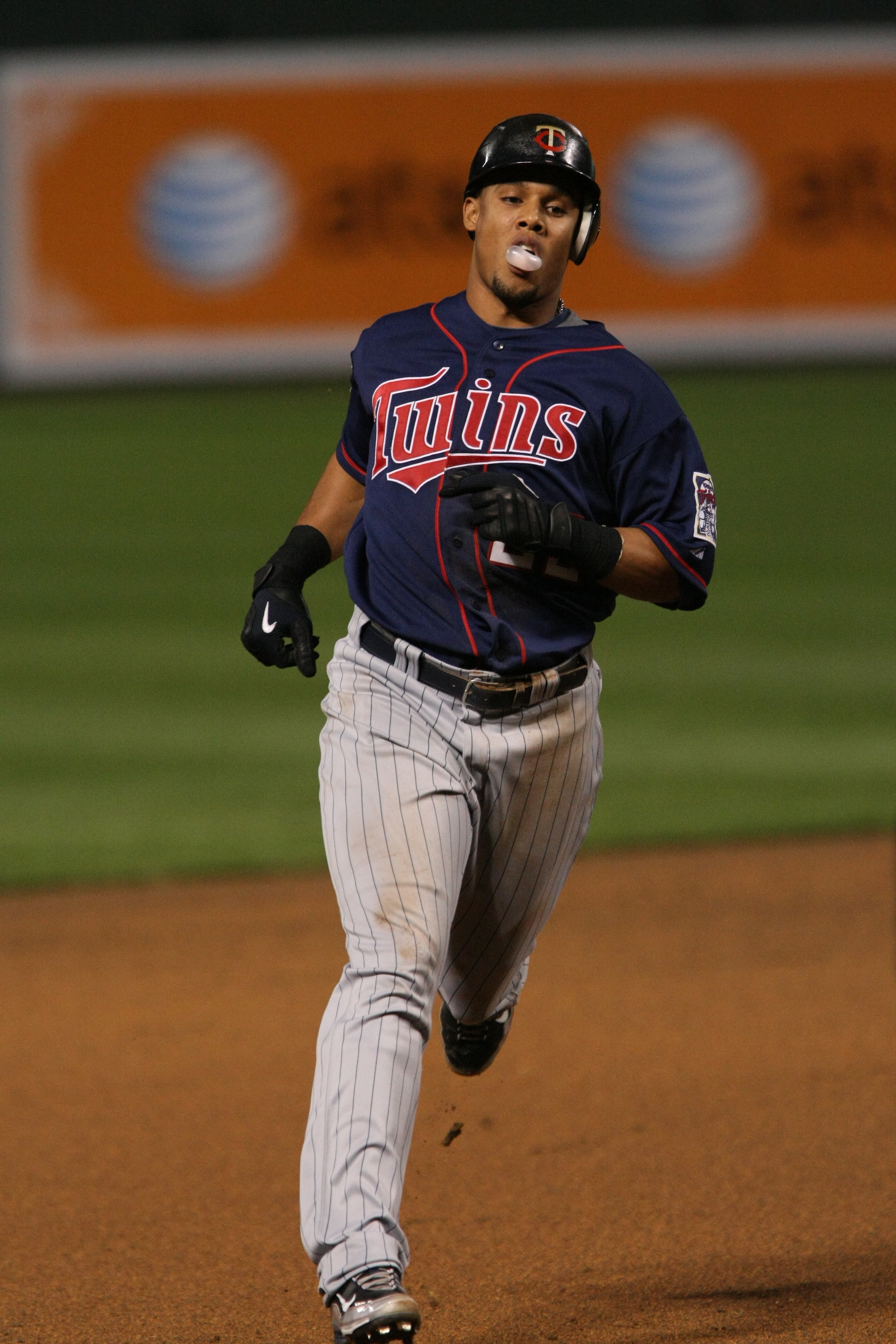
Gómez playing for the Minnesota Twins in 2009

On March 31, 2008, Gómez made his regular-season debut for the Twins, going 2-for-3 with a walk, two stolen bases and two runs as the Twins beat the Angels, 3–2. On April 11, 2008, Gómez hit his first career triple off Yasuhiko Yabuta of the Kansas City Royals. On May 7, 2008, Gómez hit for the cycle against the Chicago White Sox at U.S. Cellular Field in Chicago. He became the ninth major leaguer in history to hit for the reverse natural cycle. He also became the third-youngest player to hit for the cycle in MLB history. Gómez finished the 2008 season batting .258 with seven home runs, 59 RBI, and 33 stolen bases in 153 games. He led the major leagues with 30 bunt hits but was also picked off a major-league-leading 10 times. In addition defensively, he led all major league center fielders in errors, with eight.

During the 2009 season playing in 137 games, Gómez hit .229 with three home runs and 28 RBI. Gómez scored the winning run in the 2009 American League Central tie-breaker game on Alexi Casilla's walk-off single, clinching the AL Central division title for the Twins. Gómez also saw his first postseason action, earning the starting position in center field for Game 2 of the 2009 American League Division Series against the New York Yankees. In that game, he went 0-for-4 with a walk and run scored in Minnesota's 4–3 loss. The Yankees would go on to sweep the Twins in three games, thus ending their season.

=== Milwaukee Brewers (2010–2015) ===
After the 2009 season, Gómez was traded to the Milwaukee Brewers in exchange for J. J. Hardy and $250,000. He played in 97 games for the Brewers in 2010.

In 2011, Gómez led all NL outfielders in range factor, at 2.97, and tied for the NL lead in fielding percentage for outfielders, at 1.000. On July 20, 2011, Gómez fractured his collarbone when he made a diving catch in shallow center field but returned for the rest of the season in September. During the 2011 postseason, Gómez hit .357, with a home run and 2 RBI.

In 2012, Gómez started the season platooning with Nyjer Morgan and Norichika Aoki in center field, but eventually Gómez got more starting playing time. Gómez ended up having one of the best seasons of his major league career at that point with career highs in a .260 batting average, .305 on-base percentage, 19 home runs, and 37 stolen bases in the 2012 season.

Prior to the 2013 season, Gómez signed a three-year, $24 million extension with the Brewers.

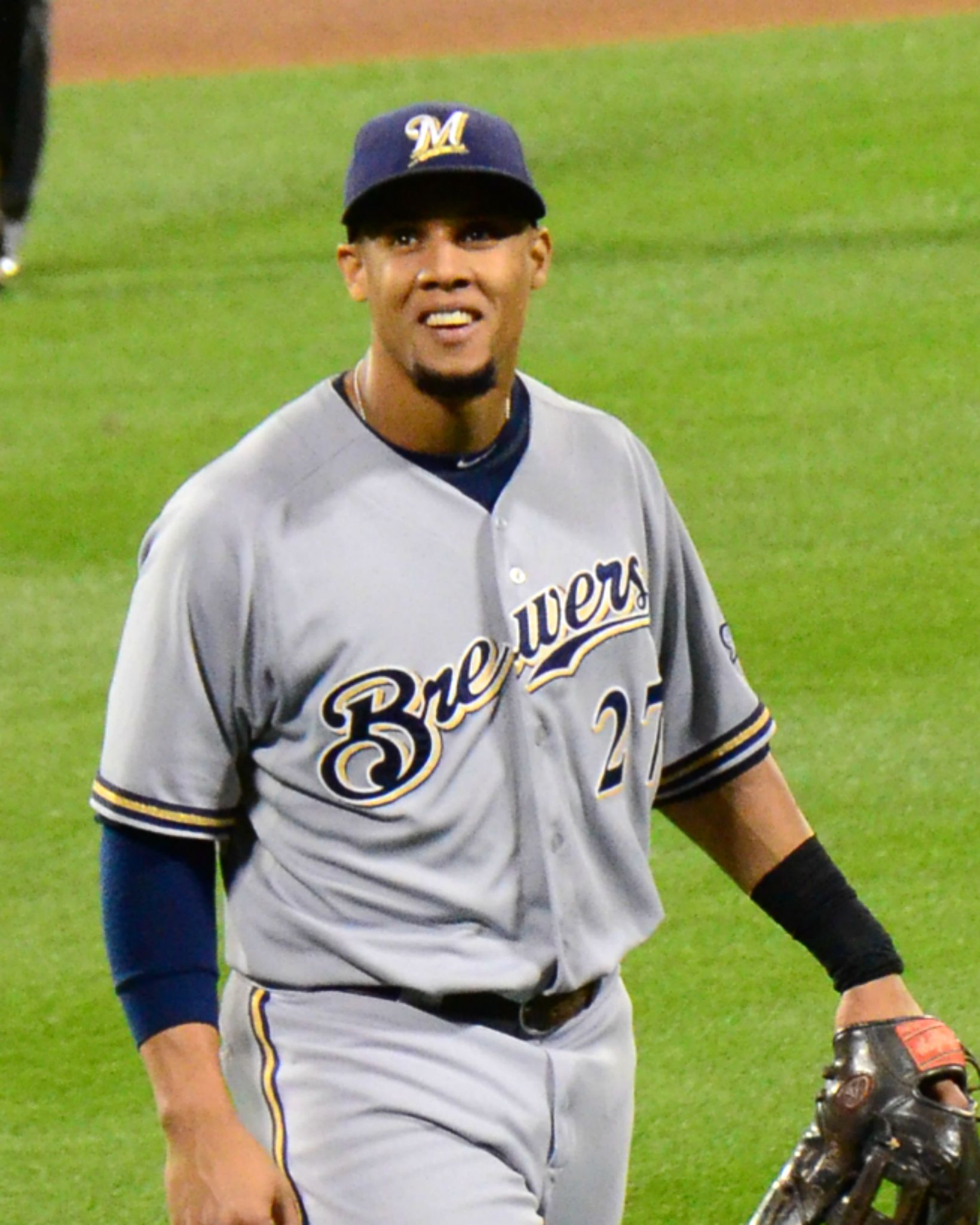
Gómez with the Milwaukee Brewers in 2013

Gómez started the 2013 season as the Brewers' starting center fielder, though he struggled early, batting only .162 after the first couple of weeks. But since then, Gómez went on a tear, getting three hits in each of the next three games, raising his average back up to .300 just a week later. Gómez was named National League Player of the Week for his efforts, the third time he had won the award. Gómez was also named to his first All-Star team. Mariano Rivera retired him to end the eighth inning in his last All-Star Game. On September 26, Gómez was suspended for one game for his role in an on-field altercation during a game a day prior against the Atlanta Braves. In that game, Gómez hit a home run, while trotting around the bases, he shouted at Braves pitcher Paul Maholm for apparently throwing at Gómez in an earlier game. As Gómez reached home plate, Braves catcher Brian McCann deliberately stood between Gómez and home plate, blocking him, which sparked a brief brawl between the two teams. Gómez's 2013 season was the best of his major league career, attaining career highs in practically every offensive category: a .284 batting average, .338 on-base percentage, 27 doubles, 10 triples, 24 home runs, 80 runs scored, 73 RBI, and 40 stolen bases in 147 games. He led the National League in power-speed number (30.0). Gómez had a spectacular season defensively as well, leading the league in defensive putouts, as well as taking away at least four potential home runs. Gómez finished third in the National League in Wins Above Replacement (WAR). He also won the NL Gold Glove Award for center field, becoming the first Brewer to win the award since Robin Yount in 1982.

Gómez began 2014 as Milwaukee's starting center fielder and leadoff hitter. In April, Gómez got into an altercation in a game against the Pittsburgh Pirates. In that particular game, Gómez hit a deep fly ball that he initially thought was a home run. As a result, he flipped his bat out of his hand, something he was known to do when hitting a home run. The ball ended up hitting the outfield wall, though Gómez still ended up at third base with a triple, Pirates pitcher Gerrit Cole confronted Gómez about showing off. The two began to argue, and as the two were separated, Pirates player Travis Snider confronted Gómez as well, causing Gómez to throw punches at Snider, igniting a brief brawl in which Snider got hit in the eye by Gómez' teammate, Martin Maldonado. Gómez was suspended for three games. He initially appealed the suspension, but dropped it after suffering a minor back injury, using the time for the suspension to rest his back. Upon his return, Gómez was moved to the clean-up spot in the Brewers batting order, due to an injury to Aramis Ramírez. Gómez had another solid season in 2014, batting .284 with 23 home runs, 73 RBI, 95 runs scored, and 34 stolen bases in 148 games, though he was also caught stealing a career-high 12 times. He again led the National League in power-speed number (27.4). He was second in the major leagues in hit by pitch, with 19.

=== Houston Astros (2015–2016) ===
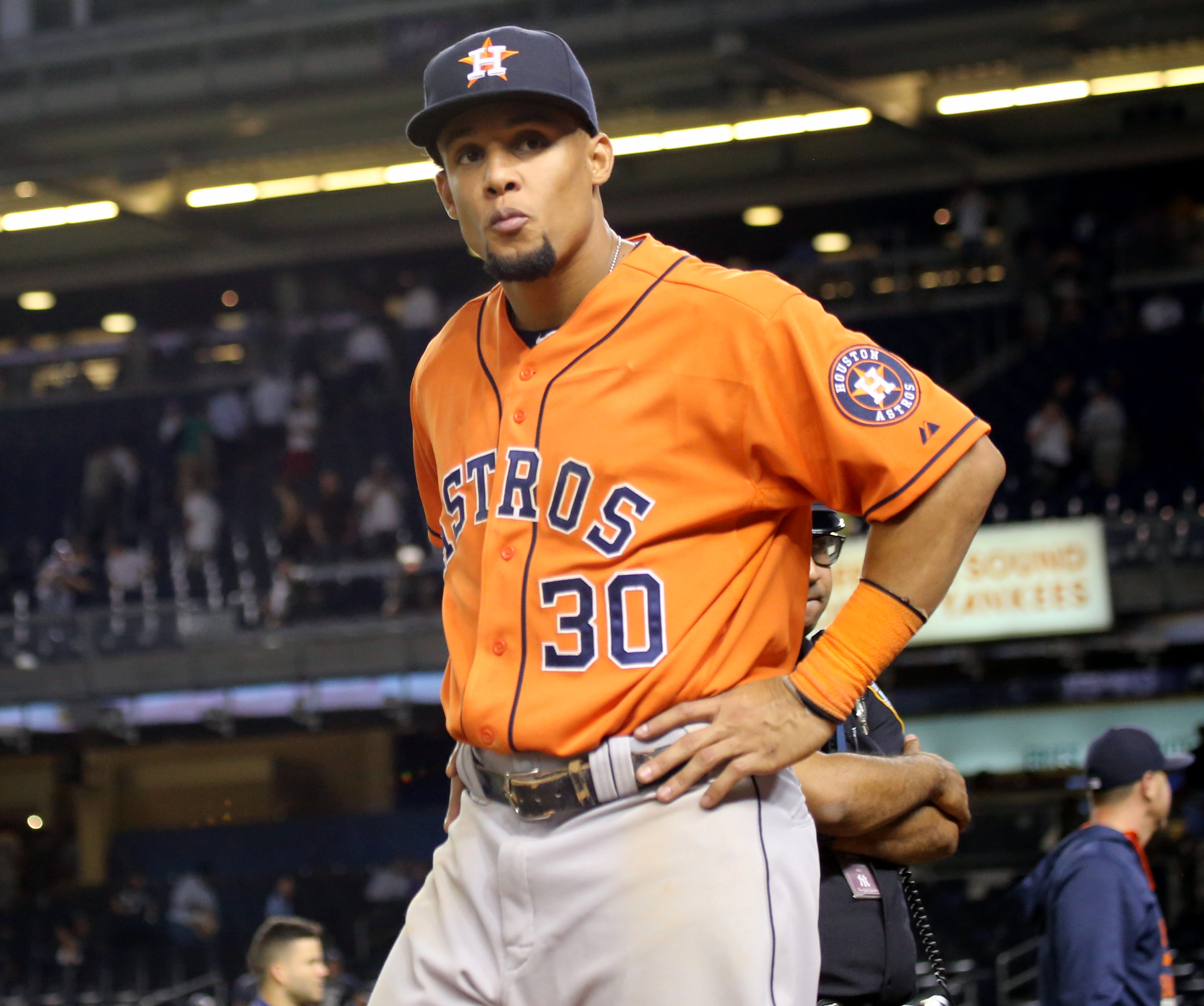
Carlos Gómez with the Houston Astros in 2015

At the 2015 trade deadline, the Brewers traded Gómez and Mike Fiers to the Houston Astros for Brett Phillips, Domingo Santana, Josh Hader, and Adrian Houser. On October 6, Gómez hit a solo home run in the AL Wild Card Game against the New York Yankees to put the Astros up 2–0 in the fourth inning, propelling them to a 3–0 win and a berth in the ALDS.

In 2016, Gómez batted .210 with five home runs and 29 RBI in 85 games for the Astros. On August 10, Gómez was designated for assignment by the Astros. He was later released on August 18.

=== Texas Rangers (2016-2017) ===
Shortly after being released by the Astros, Gómez signed a minor league contract with the Texas Rangers and was assigned to the Round Rock Express of the PCL. He was later promoted to the major leagues on August 25 and made his Rangers debut that night vs. the Cleveland Indians. Gómez homered in his first plate appearance with the club in a 9–0 win. On August 31, he hit a grand slam off Seattle Mariners pitcher Félix Hernández; having hit one against them earlier in the season while with the Astros, he became only the fourth player to hit two grand slams against the same opponent for two different teams (joining Ray Boone in 1953, Mike Piazza in 1998, and Ike Davis in 2014). Gómez finished the 2016 season with a batting average of .231, 13 home runs, 53 RBI, and 18 stolen bases in 118 combined games. Gómez rebounded with Texas, finishing with a .284 average, eight home runs, and 24 RBI in 33 games for Texas.

On December 13, 2016, Gómez re-signed with the Rangers on a one-year, $11.5 million contract. On April 29, 2017, in a game against the Los Angeles Angels, Gómez hit for the cycle for the second time in his career as the Rangers won 6–3. He played in 105 games for the Rangers, batting .255 with 17 home runs and 51 RBI.

=== Tampa Bay Rays (2018) ===
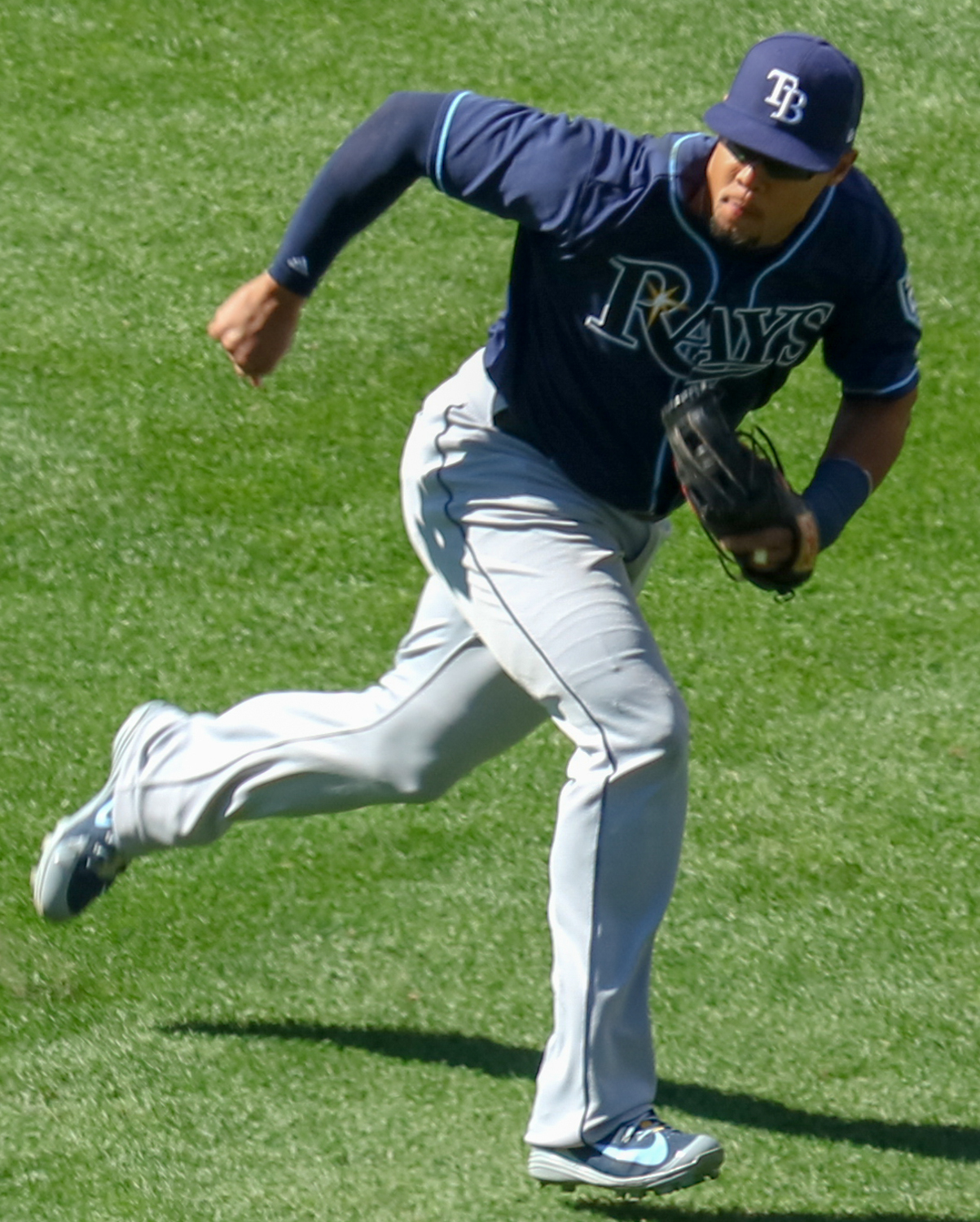
Gómez with the Tampa Bay Rays in 2018

Gómez signed a one-year, $4 million contract with the Tampa Bay Rays for the 2018 season. The contract also had a provision for $500,000 in performances bonuses based on games played: $100,000 each for 80, 90, 100, 110 and 120. On April 22, Gómez hit his first career walk-off home run in an 8–6 win over one of Gómez's former teams, the Minnesota Twins. In May 2018, Gómez said in multiple interviews that he did not believe MLB's drug testing was random and that he believed the league targets older players and Latin players. He claimed to have been tested six or seven times within the season's first two months. As translated by journalist Hector Gomez, Carlos Gómez said in Spanish: "Until they prove to me that it is random, I will not believe it. Because for me, it's not random...I have the greatest luck on my team, because they test me more than everyone else. I arrived now, three days after coming from the disabled list, and they are already testing me again."

Gomez ended the season hitting .208 (a career low)/.298/.336 with nine home runs and 32 RBI in 118 games. He was hit by pitch 21 times, which led the American League.

=== Second stint with the Mets (2019) ===
In 2019, the Mets signed Gómez to a minor league contract with an invitation to spring training. On May 18, the Mets called up Gómez. Against the Nationals, on May 23, Gómez hit a three-run home run in the bottom of the 8th to lead the Mets to a 6–4 win, his first as a Met in 12 years. Gómez was, however, released on June 30. During his second stint, he batted .198/.278/.337 with three home runs and 10 RBI in 34 games.

=== Retirement ===
In January 2020, Gómez announced his retirement from professional baseball.

In September 2021, he was inducted into the Milwaukee Brewers Wall of Honor, signing papers to officially retire as a Brewer.

== See also ==
- List of Major League Baseball players to hit for the cycle

Achievements
Preceded by Aubrey Huff; Trea Turner	Hitting for the cycle May 7, 2008; April 29, 2017	Succeeded by Mark Kotsay; Nolan Arenado
