= Brian Duensing =

American baseball pitcher (born 1983)

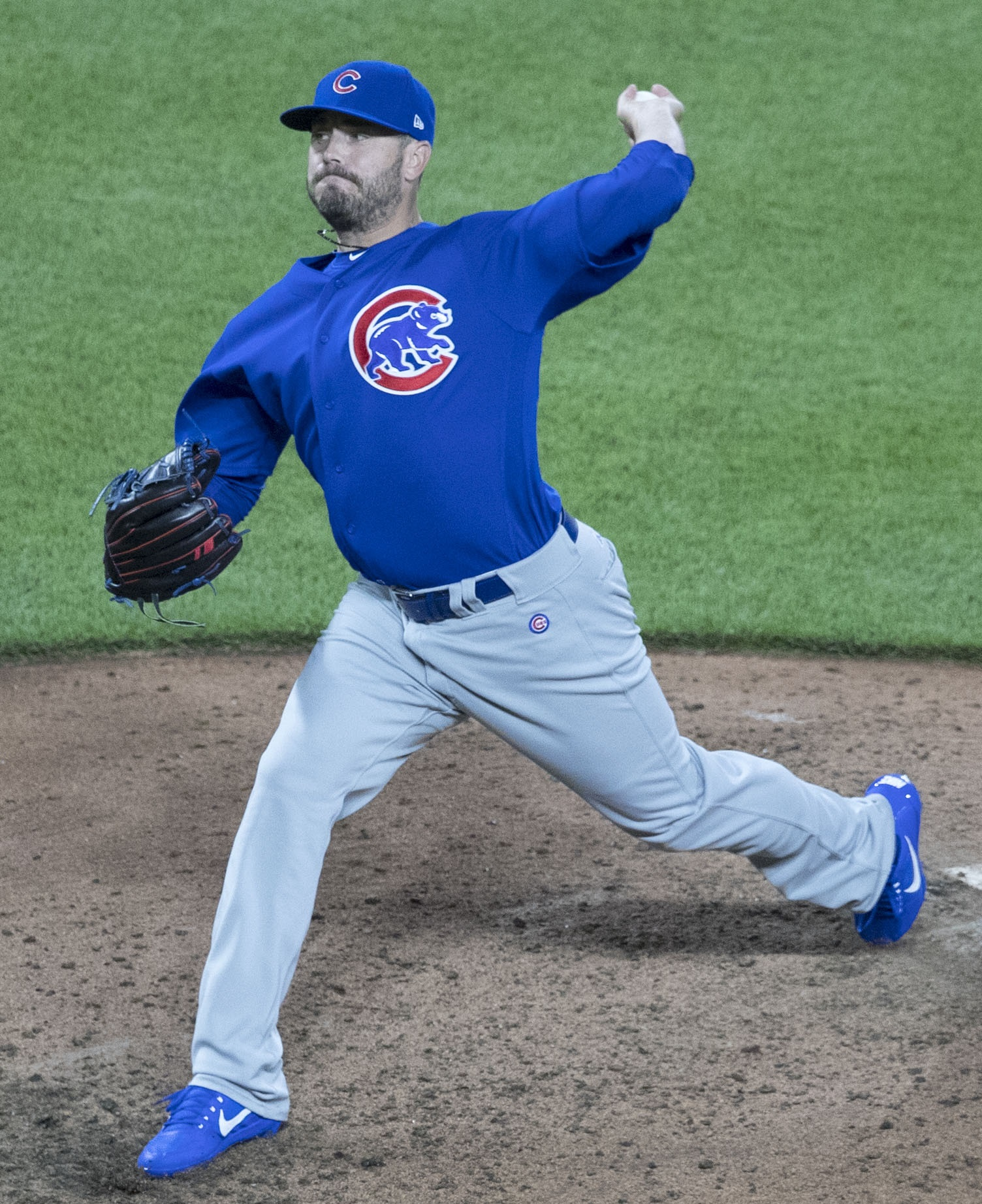
- Duensing pitching for the Chicago Cubs in 2017
- Pitcher
- Born: February 22, 1983 (age 43); Marysville, Kansas, U.S.
- Batted: Left Threw: Left

MLB debut
- April 10, 2009, for the Minnesota Twins

Last MLB appearance
- September 24, 2018, for the Chicago Cubs

MLB statistics
- Win–loss record: 46–38
- Earned run average: 4.19
- Strikeouts: 523
- Stats at Baseball Reference

Teams
- Minnesota Twins (2009–2015); Baltimore Orioles (2016); Chicago Cubs (2017–2018)
Medals
Men's baseball
Representing United States
Baseball World Cup
Gold medal – first place	2007 Tianmu	Team
Olympic Games
Bronze medal – third place	2008 Beijing	Team

Brian Matthew Duensing (DONE-sing, born February 22, 1983) is an American former professional baseball pitcher. He played in Major League Baseball (MLB) for the Minnesota Twins, Baltimore Orioles, and Chicago Cubs.

== Amateur career ==
=== High school ===
Duensing went to Millard South High School in Omaha, Nebraska, where he earned second-team All-State honors in both his junior and senior years. His senior year he batted .429, and went 2–2 with a 3.78 earned run average on the mound. His combined record in two seasons of American Legion ball was 16–3 with 141 strikeouts. He had a 0.74 ERA, and a .522 batting average his second season.

=== College ===
Duensing played college baseball for the Nebraska Cornhuskers. He was college teammate with Joba Chamberlain and Alex Gordon.

Year	ERA	W	L	G	IP	ER	BB	K
2002	4.73	6	2	18	78.0	41	25	60
2003	2.42	3	0	4	22.1	6	6	24
2005	3.00	8	0	23	84.0	28	28	52
Total	3.66	17	2	45	184.1	75	59	136

In 2002 as a freshman, Duensing went 6–2 with a 4.73 ERA, 60 strikeouts, and 25 walks in 78 innings over 18 appearances (12 starts). He replaced Shane Komine in the starting rotation in Big 12 Conference play while Komine was injured. Duensing won 6 games in a row before losing to Richmond in the Super Regional. He helped the Huskers reach the College World Series throwing 11 2/3 consecutive scoreless innings in the Regional and Super Regional rounds until allowing three runs in the 9th inning. He was an honorable-mention freshman All-American and was on the Big 12 all-freshman team.

His 2003 season was cut short by of an elbow injury that required surgery. He went 3–0 over four starts with a 2.42 ERA and 24 strikeouts versus six walks. After sitting 2004 out as a medical redshirt having Tommy John surgery, Duensing had a breakout season, going 8–0 in 2005 with a 2.60 ERA in 21 appearances. He threw 15 consecutive shutout innings in the Big 12 tournament and helped the Huskers reach the College World Series in Omaha.

== Professional career ==
=== Minor leagues ===
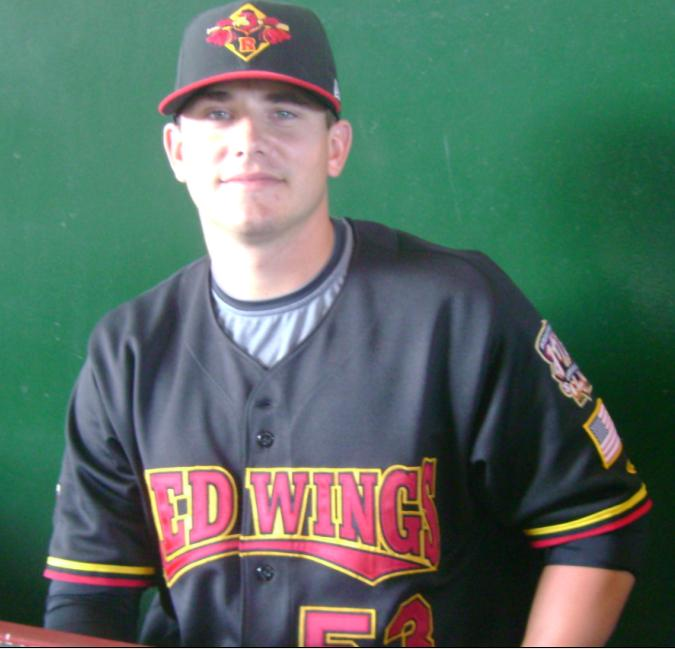
Duensing with the Rochester Red Wings in 2008

The Minnesota Twins drafted Duensing in the third round of the 2005 Major League Baseball draft. He played for the rookie team Elizabethton Twins, going 4–3 with a 2.32 ERA and striking out 55. In 2006, he went 5–10 in 28 games with a 3.49 ERA with three teams, the Double-A New Britain Rock Cats, High-A Fort Myers Miracle and Single-A Beloit Snappers. In 2007, he played part of the season with the Rock Cats, going 4–1. He was then promoted to the Triple-A Rochester Red Wings, where he went 11–5 with 3 complete games, 3.24 ERA and 86 strikeouts for the rest of the season.

=== 2008 Summer Olympics ===
Duensing was 5–11 with a 4.32 ERA and 76 strikeouts in 23 starts with the Red Wings in 2008 before ending his season in late July to play for the United States at the 2008 Olympics. He posted Brian's Baseball Blog from Beijing to give fans insight to the games from his perspective.

In his longest appearance, on August 16, Duensing pitched 3 1/3 scoreless innings in relief to earn the win for the U.S against Canada. He gave up one hit while striking out three. He pitched in 3 other games, totaling a 1.17 ERA as the U.S. won the bronze medal.

=== Minnesota Twins ===
An injury to Twins pitcher Scott Baker opened a spot for Duensing on the Twins' 2009 opening day roster. He made his major league debut on April 10, giving up a two-run home run to Carlos Quentin for his only earned runs in three innings pitched in the Twins' 12–5 victory over the Chicago White Sox. Duensing returned to Rochester on April 14 when Baker returned from the disabled list. While he was back in Triple-A, Duensing went 4–6 with a 4.66 ERA in 13 starts. The Twins recalled Duensing up on July 2, sending down Sean Henn. The next day, Duensing made his second appearance of the season, relieving 3 2/3 innings, allowing one run on one hit while walking one and striking out two against the Detroit Tigers. On July 29, he made his first major league start, against the Chicago White Sox, filling in for Francisco Liriano, who was scratched with inflammation in his left forearm. He went 5 innings, giving up 2 runs, which were both home runs, on 3 hits in a no-decision. Duensing got his first major league win on August 22 against the Kansas City Royals. He won his following start going a career-best 7 innings striking out 8 batters. He started and lost Game 1 of the 2009 American League Division Series (ALDS) against CC Sabathia and the New York Yankees.

On July 21, 2010, Duensing was inserted into the starting rotation in place of Nick Blackburn, who was sent to the bullpen. On August 14, Duensing pitched his first career shutout, besting Trevor Cahill and the Oakland Athletics. Duensing had an impressive season, going 10–3 with a 2.62 ERA. He again pitched poorly in the playoffs against the Yankees, giving up 5 runs in 3 1/3 innings in the ALDS.

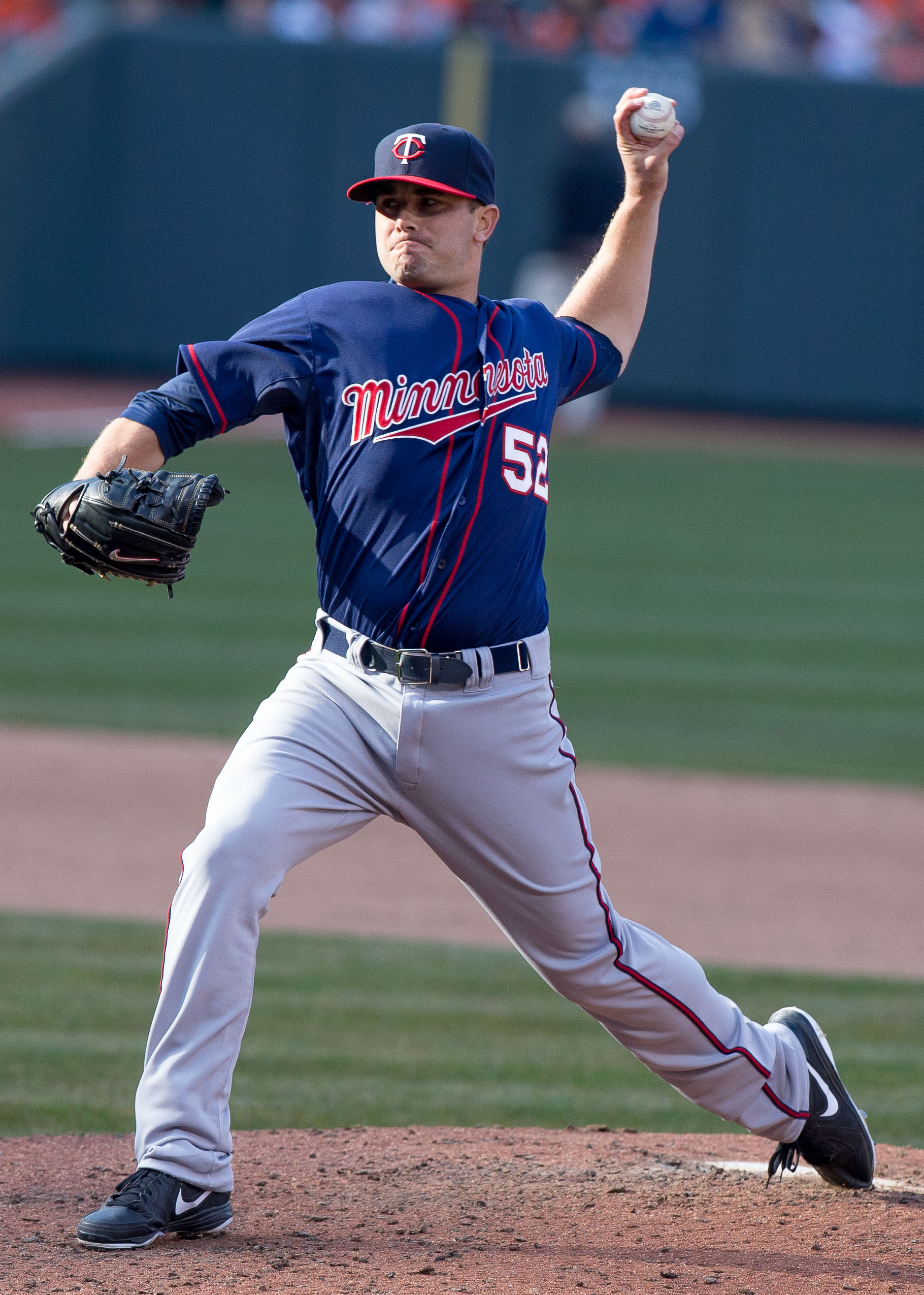
Duensing pitching for the Minnesota Twins in 2013

Duensing was given the third spot in the starting rotation for the 2011 season. While his season has some bright moments, including his July shutout against the Tampa Bay Rays, his pitching did not live up to the potential that he had shown in the later parts of 2010. He missed some starts with oblique strain, and ended the year with a 9–14 record and a 5.23 ERA.

Duensing split the 2012 season between the bullpen and the rotation, making 11 starts and 44 appearances out of the bullpen. He finished with an ERA of 5.12 and a 4–12 record.

In 2013, Duensing pitched exclusively out of the bullpen and had a 3.98 ERA in 73 games. He also notched his first career save during the season, finishing also with a 6–2 record. On August 9, Duensing won both games of a doubleheader against the Chicago White Sox. Duensing continued to pitch exclusively out of the bullpen in 2014 for the Twins, posting a 3–3 record, with a 3.31 ERA in 62 games.

On January 24, 2015, the Twins and Duensing agreed to a $2.7 million contract for 2015. That season, Duensing posted a 4–1 record and 4.25 ERA in 55 appearances out of the bullpen. He became a free agent following the season.

=== Kansas City Royals ===
On February 18, 2016, the Kansas City Royals signed Duensing to a minor league contract. He was released on March 28, and signed to re-signed to a minor league deal on April 1. He opted out on May 17.

=== Baltimore Orioles ===
On May 23, 2016, Duensing signed a minor league contract with the Baltimore Orioles. He was assigned to the Triple-A Norfolk Tides. On June 2, Duensing was selected to the active roster. He was placed on the injured list on June 22 with left elbow inflammation, and rehabbed the injury with the Double-A Bowie Baysox and the rookie-level GCL Orioles before being activated on September 5. In 14 big league games with Baltimore, Duensing recorded a 4.05 ERA with 10 strikeouts. He became a free agent following the season.

=== Chicago Cubs ===
On December 2, 2016, Duensing signed a one-year, $2 million contract with the Chicago Cubs. In his 2017 campaign, he went 1–1 with a 2.74 ERA in 68 games, his highest number of appearance since 2013.

On January 17, 2018, Duensing re-signed with the Cubs on a two-year, $7 million contract. He had a career-worst 7.65 ERA in 37 2/3 innings.

On March 24, 2019, Duensing was designated for assignment by Chicago. He was outrighted to the Triple-A Iowa Cubs on March 28. He was released by the Cubs on June 20 after posting a 6.92 ERA in 12 appearances with Iowa.

== Personal life ==
Duensing is married and has four children.

During his career, Duensing supported the Leukemia and Lymphoma Society. He won the Twins community service award in 2014, as chosen by Twin Cities-area members of the Baseball Writers' Association of America.
