= Kevin Mulvey =

American baseball player (born 1985)

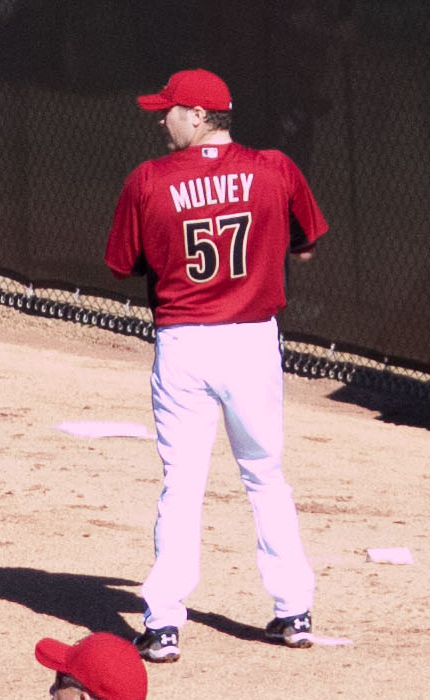
- Mulvey warming up for the Arizona Diamondbacks

Villanova Wildcats
- Pitcher / Manager
- Born: May 26, 1985 (age 41); Sayreville, New Jersey, U.S.
- Batted: Right Threw: Right

MLB debut
- July 20, 2009, for the Minnesota Twins

Last MLB appearance
- May 2, 2010, for the Arizona Diamondbacks

MLB statistics
- Win–loss record: 0–3
- Earned run average: 7.90
- Strikeouts: 19
- Stats at Baseball Reference

Teams
- Minnesota Twins (2009); Arizona Diamondbacks (2009–2010)

Kevin John Mulvey (born May 26, 1985) is an American former professional baseball pitcher who currently serves as the head baseball coach at Villanova University. He played in Major League Baseball (MLB) for the Minnesota Twins and Arizona Diamondbacks from 2009 to 2010.

== Early life ==
Mulvey is a New Jersey native. He graduated from Bishop George Ahr High School (now renamed St. Thomas Aquinas High School) in Edison, New Jersey. Mulvey attended Villanova University, and in 2004 and 2005, he played collegiate summer baseball with the Harwich Mariners of the Cape Cod Baseball League. While at Villanova, he tossed a no-hitter against Connecticut on March 26, 2005.

== Professional career ==
=== New York Mets ===
Mulvey was selected by the New York Mets in the second round (62nd overall) of the 2006 Major League Baseball draft. He made his professional debut with the rookie-level Gulf Coast League Mets August 19, 2006. A day later, he was promoted to the Double-A Binghamton Mets of the Eastern League Double-A affiliate.

In 2007, Mulvey went 11–10 with a 3.32 ERA for Binghamton and was selected to the All-Star Futures Game. In August 2007, he was promoted to the Triple-A New Orleans Zephyrs of the Pacific Coast League. In two starts, Mulvey recorded two wins without allowing an earned run.

=== Minnesota Twins ===
Mulvey was one of the players included in the Johan Santana trade between the Mets and Minnesota Twins on January 29, 2008. The other three players the Mets sent to the Twins were pitchers Philip Humber, Deolis Guerra, and outfielder Carlos Gómez. At the time of the trade, Baseball America ranked Guerra, Gomez, Mulvey and Humber the second, third, fourth and seventh best prospects in the Mets organization, respectively.

=== Arizona Diamondbacks ===
On September 1, 2009, Mulvey was claimed off of waivers by the Arizona Diamondbacks. The Diamondbacks subsequently sent cash considerations to the Twins. This claim was made shortly after a trade that sent pitcher Jon Rauch to the Twins in exchange for a player to be named later, which later became cash considerations. According to MLB.com "essentially that (the player to be named later) is Mulvey." Mulvey made six appearances (including four starts) for the Diamondbacks, logging an 0-3 record and 7.04 ERA with 18 strikeouts over 23 innings of work.

Mulvey pitched in two contests for the Diamondbacks during the 2010 season, recording a 6.00 ERA with one strikeout across three innings of work. He began the 2011 season with the Triple-A Reno Aces, compiling a 4-9 record and 6.64 ERA with 63 strikeouts in 103 innings pitched across 19 starts. Mulvey was designated for assignment by Arizona on August 16, 2011.

The Diamondbacks released Mulvey on February 29, 2012.

=== New York Mets (second stint) ===
The New York Mets signed Mulvey to a minor league contract on March 10, 2012. He was assigned to the Double-A Binghamton Mets to begin the regular season. On May 26, Mulvey retired from professional baseball. Mulvey had been 0–1 with a 5.59 ERA in 13 games with Binghamton.

== Coaching career ==
On July 14, 2016, Mulvey was named the 11th head coach in Villanova Wildcats baseball history.

=== Head coaching record ===
Record table
Season	Team	Overall	Conference	Standing	Postseason
Villanova Wildcats (Big East Conference) (2017–present)
2017	Villanova	14–33	5–13	6th	
2018	Villanova	9–39	1–17	7th	
2019	Villanova	13–38	4–13	7th	
2020	Villanova	9–5	0–0		Season canceled due to COVID-19
2021	Villanova	21–14	9–12	5th	
2022	Villanova	19–29–1	8–12	5th	
2023	Villanova	14–37	7–13	7th	
2024	Villanova	18–33	8–13	5th	
2025	Villanova	22–28	6–15	6th	
2026	Villanova	19–30	5–16	7th	
Villanova:		158–286–1 (.356)	53–124–0 (.299)		
Total:		158–286–1 (.356)			
National champion Postseason invitational champion Conference regular season champion Conference regular season and conference tournament champion Division regular season champion Division regular season and conference tournament champion Conference tournament champion
