= José Mijares =

Venezuelan baseball player (born 1984)

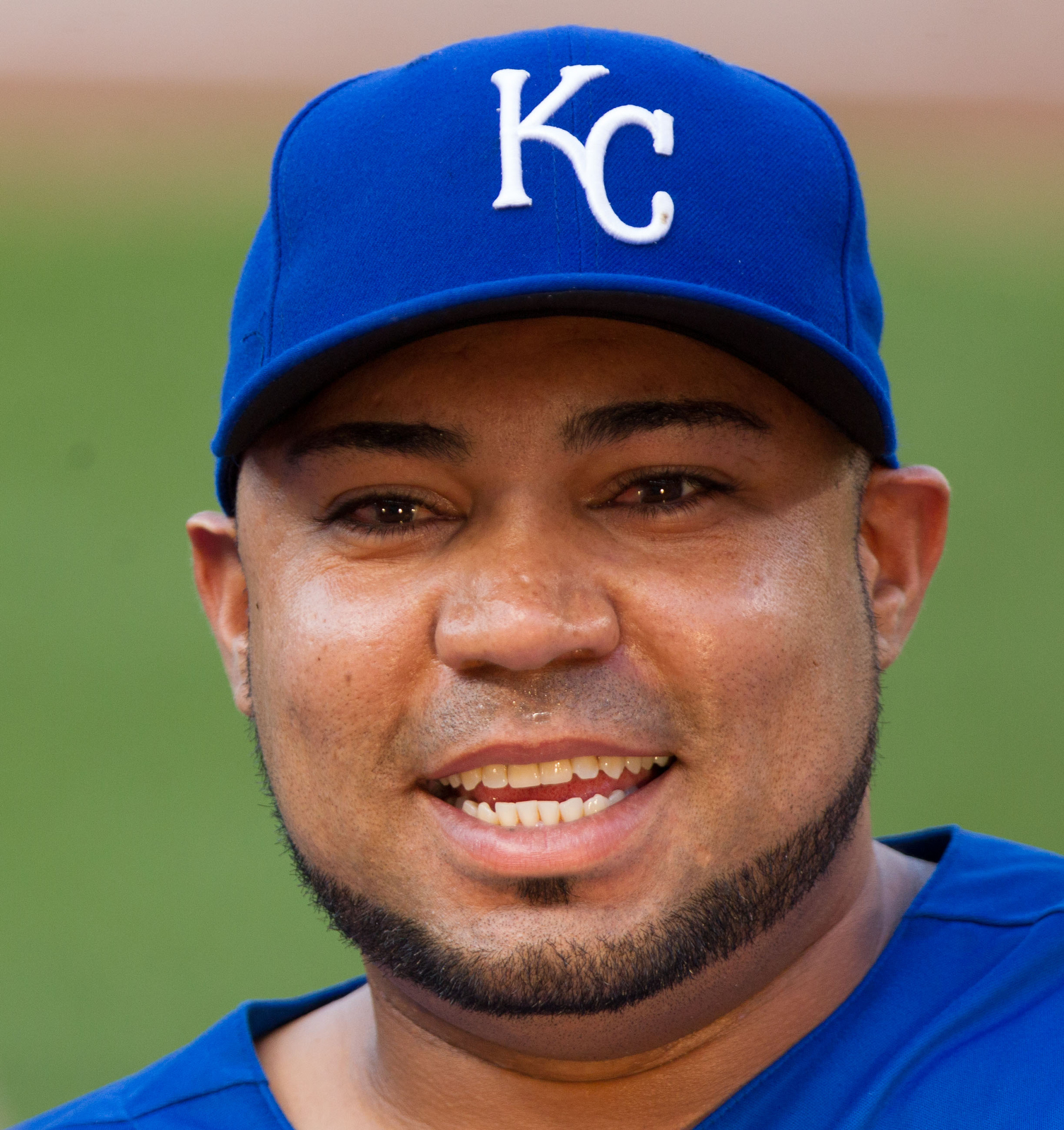
- Mijares with the Kansas City Royals
- Pitcher
- Born: October 29, 1984 (age 42); Caracas, Venezuela
- Batted: Left Threw: Left

MLB debut
- September 13, 2008, for the Minnesota Twins

Last MLB appearance
- September 28, 2013, for the San Francisco Giants

MLB statistics
- Win–loss record: 6–11
- Earned run average: 3.23
- Strikeouts: 229
- Stats at Baseball Reference

Teams
- Minnesota Twins (2008–2011); Kansas City Royals (2012); San Francisco Giants (2012–2013)

Career highlights and awards
- World Series champion (2012)

José Manuel Mijares (born October 29, 1984) is a Venezuelan former professional baseball pitcher. Mijares pitched in Major League Baseball (MLB) for the Minnesota Twins, Kansas City Royals, and San Francisco Giants.

== Professional career ==
=== Minnesota Twins ===
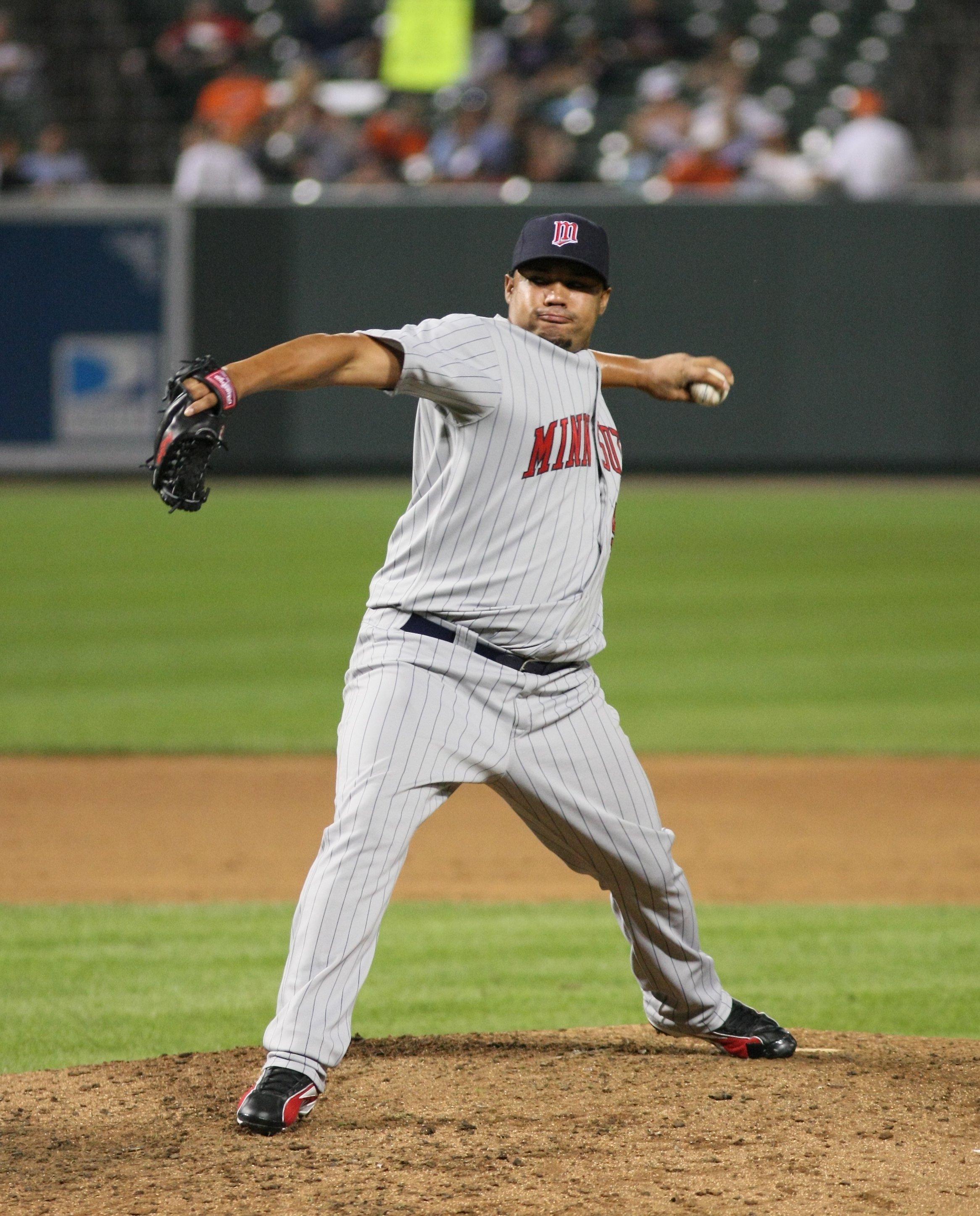
Mijares pitching for the Minnesota Twins in 2008.

Mijares signed with the Twins as a free agent on March 2, 2002 and bounced around every level of the Twins' farm system—having risen as high as the Triple-A Rochester Red Wings in 2007. He was awarded the Gulf Coast League Rolaids Relief Man Award in 2004 and elected as an All-Star in the Eastern League in 2007.

On January 24, 2008, Mijares was re-signed to a one-year deal, and on March 9, 2008, he was cut from spring training and optioned to the Double-A New Britain Rock Cats of the Eastern League. He also spent part of the 2008 season with the Gulf Coast League Twins and Fort Myers Miracle before ended the minor league season again assigned to the Rock Cats.

In September 2008, Mijares received a call up to the Twins, and made his major league debut on September 13 against the Baltimore Orioles in the first game of a doubleheader. The Twins won that game 12–2. Mijares wound up becoming the Twins main set-up man for the remainder of the season. He made 10 relief appearances, going 0–1 with an ERA of 0.87.

Following a rocky 2009 spring training camp, he was reassigned to Triple-A Rochester. On April 20, Twins set-up man Jesse Crain went on the 15-day disabled list with shoulder inflammation, and Mijares was brought back up to the big club to fill the roster spot. In his first appearance of the season on April 22, he pitched a perfect eighth inning in the Twins' 7–3 loss to the Boston Red Sox. Mijares finished the season 2–2 with a 2.34 ERA in 71 relief appearances.

On December 12, 2011, Mijares was non-tendered by the Twins.

=== Kansas City Royals ===
The Kansas City Royals signed Mijares to a one-year contract on December 21, 2011. He had a 2–2 record with a 2.56 ERA and a 1.267 WHIP in 51 games with the Royals.

=== San Francisco Giants ===
Mijares was claimed off waivers by the San Francisco Giants on August 6, 2012. He pitched in 27 games with the Giants in 2012, going 1–0 with a 2.55 ERA in 27 appearances. In the postseason, Mijares pitched in six games, including in Game 1 of the World Series. He gave up three earned runs in 2 2/3 innings with three strikeouts. Mijares won his first World Series with the Giants after they defeated the Detroit Tigers in the 2012 World Series.

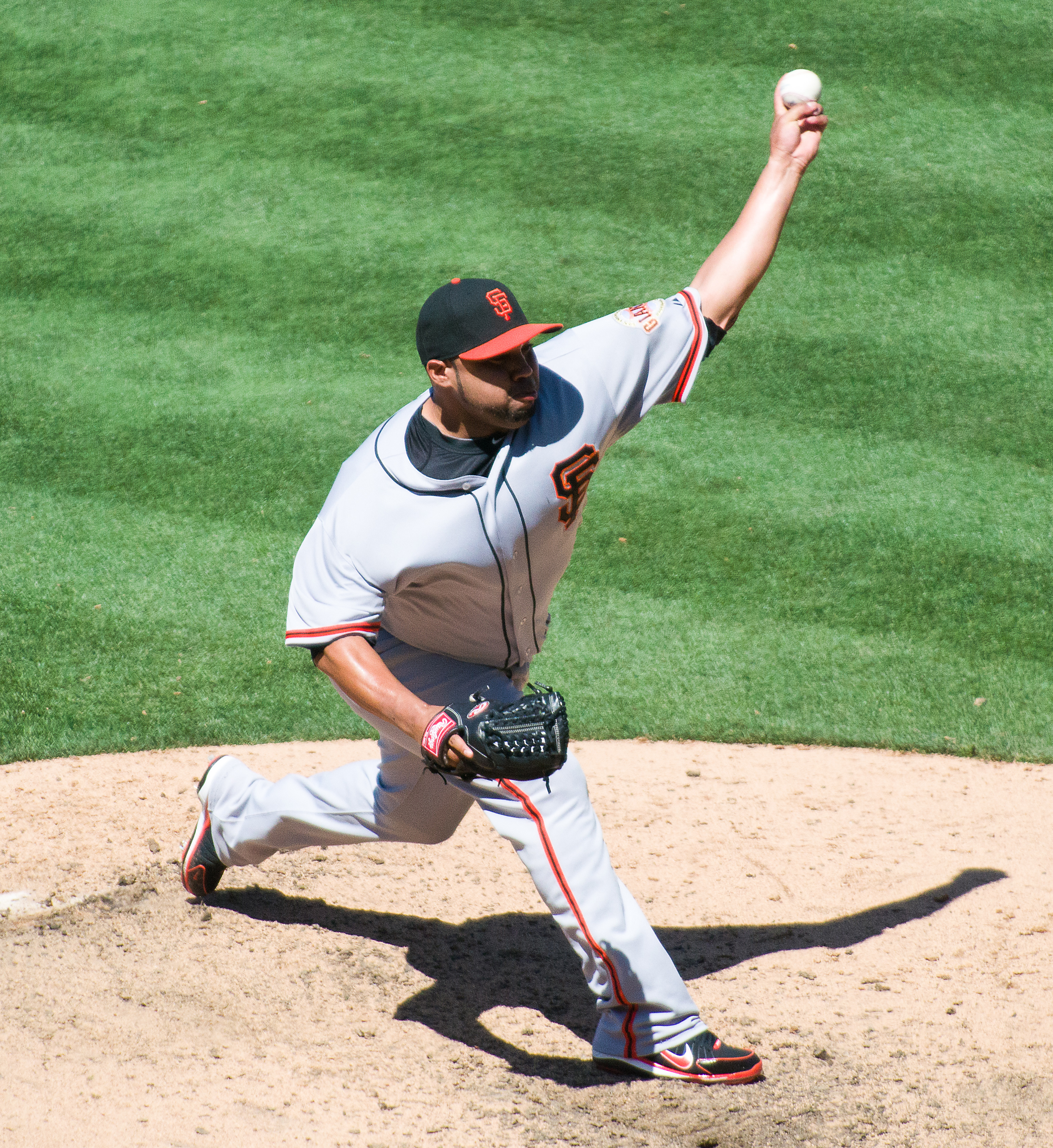
Mijares with the Giants in 2012

Mijares pitched 2013 in the Giants bullpen. He was placed on the bereavement list on April 29 after the passing of his grandmother, and he wound up on the restricted list after not arriving to the game on May 6 in time. He was activated the next day. Mijares pitched very well in the first half of the season, going 0–2 with a 2.48 ERA in 32 2/3 innings. However, his August was very rocky, as he gave up 12 runs (11 earned) in 11 innings (13 games). He pitched in only five games in September, including going three appearances in a row without retiring a batter. In 60 relief appearances, Mijares was 0–3 with a 4.22 ERA.

After the Giants re-signed Javier López to a contract on November 26, the team chose to non-tender Mijares, making him a free agent.

=== Boston Red Sox ===
On January 24, 2014, the Boston Red Sox signed Mijares to a minor league deal with an invitation to spring training. He opted out of his deal and became a free agent on March 23, 2014.

=== Cincinnati Reds ===
On December 24, 2014, the Cincinnati Reds signed Mijares to a minor league deal. On March 23, 2015, Mijares was released by the Reds.

On March 31, 2015, Mijares was suspended 50 games for drug abuse.

== Repertoire ==
Mijares throws a fastball that hits 91–94 mph and can touch 95. He also throws a hard curveball in the upper 70s and a mid 80s slider.

== See also ==
- List of Major League Baseball players from Venezuela
