= Nick Blackburn =

American baseball player (born 1982)

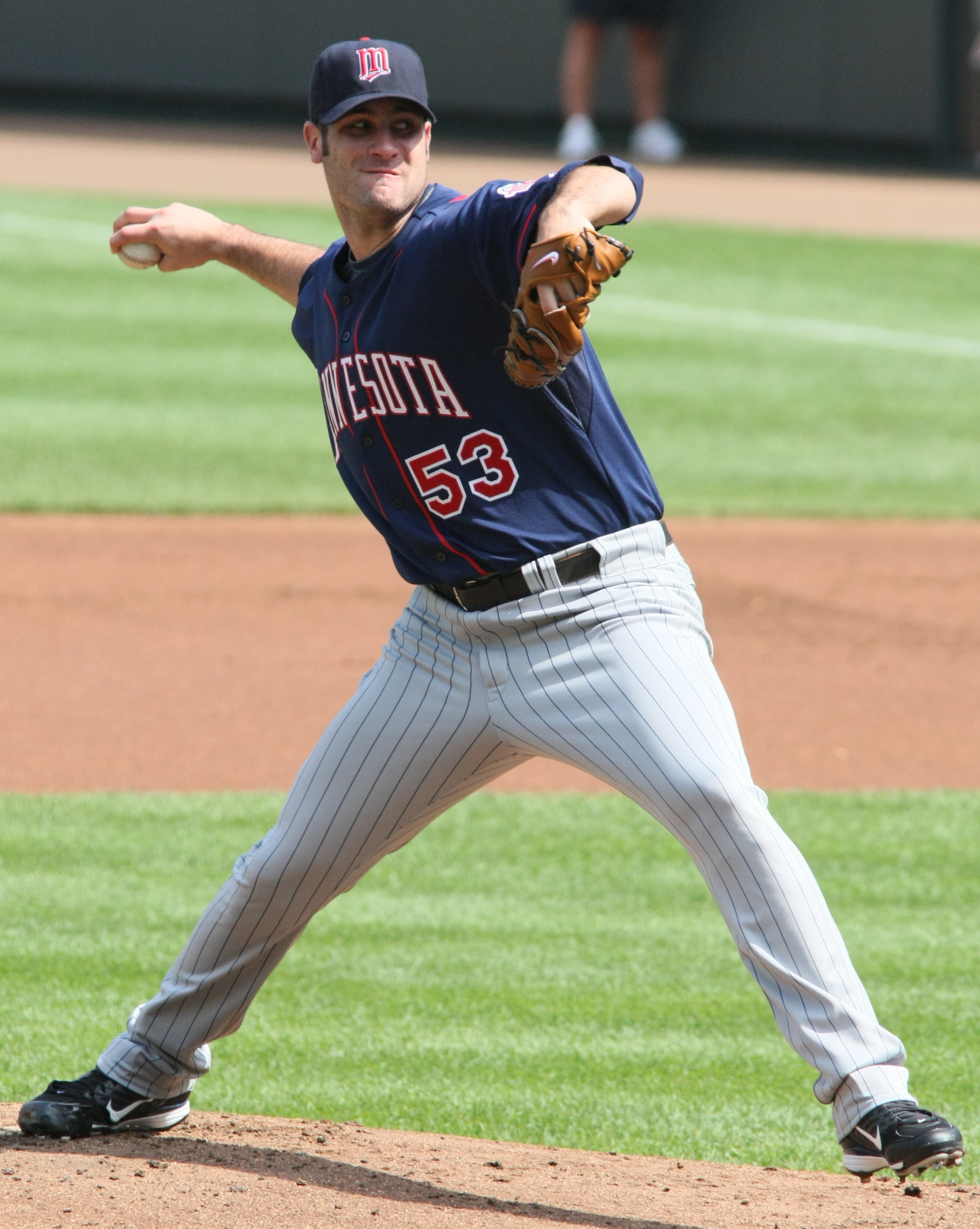
- Blackburn with the Minnesota Twins in 2008
- Pitcher
- Born: February 24, 1982 (age 44); Ada, Oklahoma, U.S.
- Batted: Right Threw: Right

MLB debut
- September 4, 2007, for the Minnesota Twins

Last MLB appearance
- August 17, 2012, for the Minnesota Twins

MLB statistics
- Win–loss record: 43–55
- Earned run average: 4.85
- Strikeouts: 388
- Stats at Baseball Reference

Teams
- Minnesota Twins (2007–2012)

Robert Nicholas Blackburn (born February 24, 1982) is an American former professional baseball pitcher. He played in Major League Baseball (MLB) for the Minnesota Twins from 2007 to 2012.

== Early career ==
Blackburn graduated from Del City High School in Del City, Oklahoma, and attended Seminole State College. The 6–4, 227 pound right-hander was originally drafted by the Tampa Bay Devil Rays in the 34th round (1,006th overall) of the 2000 Major League Baseball draft. The Minnesota Twins then drafted him in the 29th round (857th overall) of the 2001 Major League Baseball draft, and he signed with the team on May 21, 2002. From 2002 to 2007, Blackburn pitched six seasons for the Twins minor league system. In 138 minor league appearances, he pitched 702 innings, posting a 40–40 record with 434 strikeouts and a 3.68 ERA. His best season in the minors came in 2007, and after the season, Baseball America ranked him as the Twins' No. 1 prospect.

== Minnesota Twins ==
=== 2007 season ===
Blackburn started his 2007 season with the Triple-A Rochester Red Wings. In 17 starts, he pitched 110.2 innings, posting a 7–3 record with 57 strikeouts and a 2.11 ERA. He was called up by the Twins in September. Blackburn made his major league debut on September 3, 2007, in a home game against the Cleveland Indians. In his major league debut, he pitched one scoreless inning, only giving up a leadoff single to Kenny Lofton. He went on to pitch six games in 2007, all as a relief pitcher. Blackburn picked up his first hold on September 10, 2007, against the Kansas City Royals. Through his first four games, he posted a 2.08 ERA; however, he gave up eight earned runs in his last two appearances, raising his season total ERA to 7.71.

=== 2008 season ===
Blackburn pitched 16 innings in spring training for the Twins, posting a 2.25 ERA, earning him a starting spot on the 2008 rotation. He picked up his first major league win on April 19, 2008, against the Cleveland Indians, pitching 7.2 innings of shutout baseball.

On May 1, 2008, Blackburn was hit in the face by a line drive off the bat of New York Yankees outfielder Bobby Abreu; Though he did not miss any time, he said in early 2009 that the incident affected him mentally on the mound for the rest of the season.

Through July 27, 2008, he had the lowest ERA for Minnesota Twins starting pitchers with a 3.69 ERA. He finished the season with an 11–11 record, an ERA of 4.05, and 96 strikeouts in 33 starts.

After the Twins and the Chicago White Sox ended the season with 88–74 records to top the AL Central, Blackburn started the one-game tiebreaker to determine the division winner. Blackburn gave up just four hits, including a Jim Thome home run, but this home run proved to be the only scoring, as the Twins posted just two hits against starter John Danks.

=== 2009 season ===
Blackburn was in the starting rotation for the entire season. He posted a record of 11–11 with a 4.03 ERA in 33 starts despite leading the AL in hits allowed (240). He also had 98 strikeouts and threw three complete games.

=== 2010 season ===
On March 7, 2010, Blackburn signed a four-year, $14 million contract extension with the Twins that included a club option for 2014. Blackburn started the 2010 season relatively strong, going 6–1 in April and May, with a 4.28 ERA. However, he struggled after that, going 1–6 with a 9.88 ERA over his next nine starts, and on July 21, 2010, Blackburn was demoted to the bullpen and replaced in the rotation by Brian Duensing. In one relief appearance on July 25, Blackburn surrendered three earned runs in two innings. Through July 29, Blackburn was 7–7 with a 6.66 ERA.

On July 29, the Twins optioned Blackburn to Triple-A Rochester to make room on the active roster for newly acquired closer Matt Capps. He was recalled on August 21, 2010, after Kevin Slowey was placed on the 15-day disabled list with a triceps injury.

On August 29, in his second start since being recalled, Blackburn retired 21 batters in a row. After walking Chone Figgins in the bottom of the ninth, he was relieved and Brian Fuentes struck out Russell Branyan.

Despite finishing the season with an ERA of 5.42, Blackburn finished with a record of 10–12 in 26 starts for the Twins.

=== 2011 season ===
Blackburn was in the starting rotation for much of 2011. He made several strong starts and pitched well until the end of July, when his pitching became much more erratic. Blackburn made his final 2011 appearance on August 21, leaving after 1.1 innings with a forearm injury. He finished the season with a 7–10 record and a 4.49 ERA in 26 starts. His control was an issue throughout the season, as he induced 54 walks in just 148.1 innings.

=== 2012 season ===
On August 20, after pitching to a 7.39 ERA for the season, the Twins outrighted Blackburn to Rochester. Blackburn's 2012 season was an abysmal showing, as he finished 4–9 in 19 starts. He also surrendered 143 hits in less than 100 innings.

=== 2013 season ===
On October 25, 2012, Blackburn had successful surgery to remove a bone chip in his throwing elbow, and was on track to return for spring training. In January, he was removed from the 40-man roster.

He did not pitch in the Majors in 2013, spending the whole season in the minors. Blackburn went on to make just six starts in the minor leagues, recording a 5.02 ERA before being shut down due to knee problems.

=== 2014 season ===
After being released by the Twins in late 2013, Blackburn encountered problems with his surgically repaired knee which he had surgery on in August. Because of a needed second surgery on his right knee, Blackburn spent the 2014 season recovering from knee surgery. Since his retirement, Blackburn went on to be a coach for his former high school, Washington High School in Washington, Oklahoma.

== Pitching style ==
Blackburn's repertoire consisted of a two-seam fastball, changeup, curveball, and slider. His two-seam fastball was not overpowering, usually in the high 80's to low 90's; however, his 6–4 stand makes his fastball “appear to get on batters faster than the miles per hour would indicate.” He normally uses his two-seam fastball to generate groundballs. He throws a nice curveball and tight slider. When pitching at his best, he can locate all four of his pitches for strikes, which can make him nearly unhittable.

== Coaching career ==
Blackburn was hired as the pitching coach at Mid-American Christian University on May 9, 2019. He had previously coached at Washington High School in Oklahoma.
