= 2009 Cleveland Indians season =

2009 Cleveland Indians
- League: American League
- Division: Central
- Ballpark: Progressive Field
- City: Cleveland, Ohio
- Record: 65–97 (.401)
- Divisional place: 4th
- Owners: Larry Dolan
- General managers: Mark Shapiro
- Managers: Eric Wedge
- Television: SportsTime Ohio · WKYC (Matt Underwood, Rick Manning, Al Pawlowski)
- Radio: WTAM · WMMS; Cleveland Indians Radio Network (Tom Hamilton, Jim Rosenhaus, Mike Hegan)

The 2009 Cleveland Indians season marks the 109th season for the franchise, with the Indians attempting (but failing) to improve on their 81–81 record and third-place finish in the American League Central in 2008. The team played all of its home games at Progressive Field (formerly known as Jacobs Field).

The season began on April 6 with a 9–1 loss to the Texas Rangers at Rangers Ballpark in Arlington. The Home Opener was on April 10 with the Indians losing 13–7 to the Toronto Blue Jays. The season ended on October 4 against the Boston Red Sox at Fenway Park.

2009 is the first year that the Indians held spring training in Goodyear, Arizona. Goodyear replaces Winter Haven, Florida after 15 years of spring training.

The Indians ended their season at 65–97. For the Indians, this marks their first season since 1987 (the infamous "Indian Uprising" season) that they were below .500 for the entire season.

== Regular season ==
=== April ===
The Indians struggled at the beginning of the season, losing their first five and seven of their first eight games. They finished with an 8–14 record in April, and were in last place in the AL central for the entire month. One of the few highlights of the month was the Tribe defeating former Indian CC Sabathia and the New York Yankees 10–2 in the first game ever at the new Yankee Stadium. Starting pitcher Cliff Lee had his first win of the season in that game. Two days later, the Indians defeated the Yankees 22–4.

=== May ===
The Indians went 14–16 in May, but were in last place in the division throughout the entire month. The Indians struggled on many fronts, including an ineffective bullpen and poor hitting. Several players were sent to the disabled list including Travis Hafner, Grady Sizemore, and Asdrúbal Cabrera. The poor play and injuries allowed many minor league players to come up from AAA Columbus and contribute to the Indians. A turning point came in the season when on May 25, when the Indians defeated the Tampa Bay Rays 11–10 after coming back from a 10–0 deficit. The Indians rallied to win 5 of the final 7 games in the month

== Season standings ==
AL Central
Team	W	L	Pct.	GB	Home	Road
Minnesota Twins	87	76	.534	—	49‍–‍33	38‍–‍43
Detroit Tigers	86	77	.528	1	51‍–‍30	35‍–‍47
Chicago White Sox	79	83	.488	7½	43‍–‍38	36‍–‍45
Cleveland Indians	65	97	.401	21½	35‍–‍46	30‍–‍51
Kansas City Royals	65	97	.401	21½	33‍–‍48	32‍–‍49

== Record vs. opponents ==
2009 American League record Source: MLB Standings Grid – 2009
Team	BAL	BOS	CWS	CLE	DET	KC	LAA	MIN	NYY	OAK	SEA	TB	TEX	TOR	NL
Baltimore	–	2–16	5–4	2–5	3–5	4–4	2–8	3–2	5–13	1–5	4–5	8–10	5–5	9–9	11–7
Boston	16–2	–	4–4	7–2	6–1	5–3	4–5	4–2	9–9	5–5	2–4	9–9	2–7	11–7	11–7
Chicago	4–5	4−4	–	10–8	9–9	9–9	5–4	6−12	3–4	4–5	4–5	6–2	2–4	1–6	12–6
Cleveland	5–2	2–7	8–10	–	4–14	10–8	2–4	8–10	3–5	2–5	6–4	5–3	1–8	4–4	5–13
Detroit	5–3	1–6	9–9	14–4	–	9–9	5–4	7–12	1–5	5–4	5–4	5–2	7–2	3–5	10–8
Kansas City	4–4	3–5	9–9	8–10	9–9	–	1–9	6–12	2–4	2–6	5–4	1–9	3–3	4–3	8–10
Los Angeles	8–2	5–4	4–5	4–2	4–5	9–1	–	6–4	5–5	12–7	10–9	4–2	8–11	4–4	14–4
Minnesota	2–3	2–4	12–6	10–8	12–7	12–6	4–6	–	0–7	4–6	5–5	3–3	6–4	3–5	12–6
New York	13–5	9–9	4–3	5–3	5–1	4–2	5–5	7–0	–	7–2	6–4	11–7	5–4	12–6	10–8
Oakland	5–1	5–5	5–4	5–2	4–5	6–2	7–12	6–4	2–7	–	5–14	6–4	11–8	3–6	5–13
Seattle	5–4	4–2	5–4	4–6	4–5	4–5	9–10	5–5	4–6	14–5	–	5–3	8–11	3–4	11–7
Tampa Bay	10–8	9–9	2–6	3–5	2–5	9–1	2–4	3–3	7–11	4–6	3–5	–	3–6	14–4	13–5
Texas	5–5	7–2	4–2	8–1	2–7	3–3	11–8	4–6	4–5	8–11	11–8	6–3	–	5–5	9–9
Toronto	9–9	7–11	6–1	4–4	5–3	3–4	4–4	5–3	6–12	6–3	4–3	4–14	5–5	–	7–11

- Source: MLB Standings Grid – 2009

=== Roster ===
2009 Cleveland Indians
Roster
Pitchers: 59 Winston Abreu; 36 Greg Aquino; 63 Rafael Betancourt; 55 Fausto Carmona; 59 Carlos Carrasco; 39 Vinnie Chulk; 20 Mike Gosling; 40 Matt Herges; 38 David Huff; 57 Zach Jackson; 30 Masahide Kobayashi; 32 Aaron Laffey; 31 Cliff Lee; 50 Jensen Lewis; 46 Scott Lewis; 63 Justin Masterson; 16 Tomo Ohka; 44 Carl Pavano; 54 Chris Perez; 53 Rafael Pérez; 27 Anthony Reyes; 56 Rich Rundles; 49 Tony Sipp; 38 Joe Smith; 45 Jeremy Sowers; 40 Jess Todd; 47 José Veras; 47 Luis Vizcaíno; 34 Kerry Wood	Catchers: 30 Lou Marson; 41 Víctor Martínez; 10 Kelly Shoppach; 15 Wyatt Toregas; Infielders: 29 Josh Barfield; 13 Asdrúbal Cabrera; 11 Jamey Carroll; 7 Mark DeRosa; 25 Ryan Garko; 8 Chris Gimenez; 4 Tony Graffanino; 25 Andy Marte; 2 Jhonny Peralta; 4 Niuman Romero; 1 Luis Valbuena; Outfielders: 23 Michael Brantley; 17 Shin-Soo Choo; 30 Trevor Crowe; 20 David Dellucci; 12 Ben Francisco; 7 Matt LaPorta; 24 Grady Sizemore; Other batters: 48 Travis Hafner	Manager: 22 Eric Wedge; Coaches: 28 Jeff Datz (third base); 33 Chuck Hernandez (bullpen); 6 Luis Rivera (first base/infield); 9 Derek Shelton (hitting); 35 Joel Skinner (bench); 51 Carl Willis (pitching)

== Game log ==
2009 Game Log
April (8–14)

#	Date	Opponent	Score	Win	Loss	Save	Attendance	Record
1	April 6	@ Rangers	9–1	Millwood (1–0)	Lee (0–1)		49,916	0–1
2	April 8	@ Rangers	8–5	Padilla (1–0)	Carmona (0–1)	Francisco (1)	22,829	0–2
3	April 9	@ Rangers	12–8	McCarthy (1–0)	Pavano (0–1)		14,672	0–3
4	April 10	Blue Jays	13–7	League (1–0)	Pérez (0–1)		42,473	0–4
5	April 11	Blue Jays	5–4	Halladay (2–0)	Lee (0–2)	Frasor (1)	20,895	0–5
6	April 12	Blue Jays	8–4	Reyes (1–0)	Purcey (0–1)		14,216	1–5
7	April 13	@ Royals	4–2	Greinke (2–0)	Carmona (0–2)	Soria (4)	10,061	1–6
8	April 14	@ Royals	9–3	Davies (1–0)	Pavano (0–2)		11,756	1–7
9	April 15	@ Royals	5–4	Lewis (1–0)	Farnsworth (0–2)	Wood (1)	13,589	2–7
10	April 16	@ Yankees	10–2	Lee (1–2)	Veras (0–1)		48,271	3–7
11	April 17	@ Yankees	6–5	Bruney (2–0)	Lewis (1–1)	Rivera (3)	45,101	3–8
12	April 18	@ Yankees	22–4	Carmona (1–2)	Wang (0–3)		45,167	4–8
13	April 19	@ Yankees	7–3	Albaladejo (1–0)	Lewis (1–2)		43,068	4–9
14	April 21	Royals	8–7	Laffey (1–0)	Ponson (0–2)	Wood (2)	11,408	5–9
15	April 22	Royals	2–0	Bannister (1–0)	Lee (1–3)	Soria (5)	13,509	5–10
16	April 23	Royals	5–2	Lewis (2–2)	Meche (1–1)	Wood (3)	12,852	6–10
17	April 24	Twins	5–1	Blackburn (1–1)	Carmona (1–3)		20,215	6–11
18	April 25	Twins	7–1	Slowey (3–0)	Pavano (0–3)		23,186	6–12
19	April 26	Twins	4–2	Laffey (2–0)	Perkins (1–2)	Wood (4)	20,153	7–12
20	April 27	Red Sox	3–1	Delcarmen (1–0)	Wood (0–1)	Papelbon (5)	18,652	7–13
21	April 28	Red Sox	9–8	Wood (1–1)	López (0–2)		19,613	8–13
22	April 29	Red Sox	6–5 (10)	Okajima (2–0)	Lewis (2–3)	Papelbon (6)	19,137	8–14

May (14–16)

#	Date	Opponent	Score	Win	Loss	Save	Attendance	Record
23	May 1	@ Tigers	6–5	Pavano (1–3)	Galarraga (3–1)	Wood (5)	22,288	9–14
24	May 2	@ Tigers	9–7	Zumaya (1–0)	Betancourt (0–1)	Rodney (5)	34,646	9–15
25	May 3	@ Tigers	3–1	Verlander (2–2)	Lee (1–4)	Rodney (6)	27,411	9–16
26	May 4	@ Blue Jays	9–7 (12)	Betancourt (1–1)	Camp (0–1)	Lewis (1)	15,295	10–16
27	May 5	@ Blue Jays	10–6	Wolfe (1–0)	Chulk (0–1)		22,005	10–17
28	May 6	@ Red Sox	9–2	Pavano (2–3)	Masterson (2–2)	Laffey (1)	37,888	11–17
29	May 7	@ Red Sox	13–3	Wakefield (4–1)	Sowers (0–1)		37,541	11–18
30	May 8	Tigers	1–0	Verlander (3–2)	Lee (1–5)		27,492	11–19
31	May 9	Tigers	4–0	Jackson (2–2)	Carmona (1–4)		33,640	11–20
32	May 10	Tigers	5–3	Porcello (3–3)	Reyes (1–1)		25,705	11–21
33	May 11	White Sox	9–4	Pavano (3–3)	Floyd (2–3)		14,567	12–21
34	May 12	White Sox	7–4	Carrasco (1–0)	Sowers (0–2)	Jenks (8)	16,760	12–22
35	May 13	White Sox	4–0	Lee (2–5)	Buehrle (5–1)		23,884	13–22
36	May 14	@ Rays	11–7	Carmona (2–4)	Shields (3–4)		17,169	14–22
37	May 15	@ Rays	8–7	Wheeler (1–0)	Vizcaíno (0–1)		25,827	14–23
38	May 16	@ Rays	4–2	Garza (4–2)	Pavano (3–4)	Nelson (2)	34,235	14–24
39	May 17	@ Rays	7–5	Sonnanstine (2–4)	Huff (0–1)	Percival (6)	28,841	14–25
40	May 19	@ Royals	6–5	Farnsworth (1–3)	Wood (1–2)		25,024	14–26
41	May 20	@ Royals	6–5	Laffey (3–0)	Ponson (1–5)	Wood (6)	19,652	15–26
42	May 21	@ Royals	8–3	Pavano (4–4)	Ramírez (0–2)	Betancourt (1)	23,095	16–26
43	May 22	@ Reds	3–1	Arroyo (6–3)	Laffey (3–1)	Cordero (11)	28,019	16–27
44	May 23	@ Reds	7–6	Vizcaíno (1–1)	Weathers (0–1)	Wood (7)	35,821	17–27
45	May 24	@ Reds	4–3 (11)	Fisher (1–0)	Vizcaíno (1–2)		27,796	17–28
46	May 25	Rays	11–10	Sowers (1–2)	Isringhausen (0–1)		20,929	18–28
47	May 26	Rays	5–1	Pavano (5–4)	Garza (4–3)		18,754	19–28
48	May 27	Rays	12–7	Aquino (1–0)	Sonnanstine (3–5)	Vizcaíno (1)	19,335	20–28
49	May 28	Rays	2–1	Herges (1–0)	Niemann (4–4)	Wood (8)	27,356	21–28
50	May 29	Yankees	3–1	Pettitte (5–1)	Lee (2–6)	Rivera (10)	32,802	21–29
51	May 30	Yankees	10–5	Sabathia (5–3)	Carmona (2–5)		34,396	21–30
52	May 31	Yankees	5–4	Wood (2–2)	Coke (1–3)		29, 405	22–30

June (9–18)

#	Date	Opponent	Score	Win	Loss	Save	Attendance	Record
53	June 1	Yankees	5–2	Chamberlain (3–1)	Aquino (1–1)	Rivera (11)	23,651	22–31
54	June 2	@ Twins	4–3	Slowey (8–1)	Huff (0–2)	Nathan (10)	26,530	22–32
55	June 3	@ Twins	10–1	Lee (3–6)	Swarzak (1–2)		29,336	23–32
56	June 4	@ Twins	11–3	Baker (3–6)	Carmona (2–6)		20,897	23–33
57	June 5	@ White Sox	6–0	Pavano (6–4)	Danks (4–4)		29,825	24–33
58	June 6	@ White Sox	4–2	Floyd (4–5)	Sowers (1–3)	Jenks (13)	30,307	24–34
59	June 7	@ White Sox	8–4	Huff (1–2)	Colón (3–6)		25,609	25–34
60	June 9	Royals	8–4	Pérez (1–1)	Cruz (3–2)		15,038	26–34
61	June 10	Royals	9–0	Meche (3–5)	Pavano (6–5)		16,257	26–35
62	June 11	Royals	4–3 (10)	Herges (2–0)	Farnsworth (1–4)		14,342	27–35
63	June 12	Cardinals	7–3	Huff (2–2)	Piñeiro (5–7)		28,159	28–35
64	June 13	Cardinals	3–1	Thompson (1–2)	Ohka (0–1)	Franklin (15)	31,754	28–36
65	June 14	Cardinals	3–0	Lee (4–6)	Carpenter (4–1)		23,644	29–36
66	June 15	Brewers	14–12	Coffey (2–1)	Pérez (1–2)	Hoffman (16)	25,415	29–37
67	June 16	Brewers	7–5	Gallardo (7–3)	Sowers (1–4)		22,986	29–38
68	June 17	Brewers	9–8 (11)	DiFelice (4–0)	Aquino (1–2)	Stetter (1)	15,269	29–39
69	June 19	@ Cubs	8–7 (10)	Gregg (2–1)	Vizcaíno (1–3)		40,155	29–40
70	June 20	@ Cubs	6–5 (13)	Patton (3–1)	Wood (2–3)		41,007	29–41
71	June 21	@ Cubs	6–2	Wells (1–3)	Sowers (1–5)	Gregg (11)	40,866	29–42
72	June 23	@ Pirates	5–4	Huff (3–2)	Snell (2–8)	Wood (9)	19,109	30–42
73	June 24	@ Pirates	10–6	Duke (8–5)	Pavano (6–6)		20,162	30–43
74	June 25	@ Pirates	3–2	Capps (1–3)	Herges (2–1)		30,120	30–44
75	June 26	Reds	9–2	Sowers (2–5)	Harang (5–8)		28,114	31–44
76	June 27	Reds	7–3	Bailey (1–0)	Ohka (0–2)		28,646	31–45
77	June 28	Reds	8–1	Owings (5–8)	Huff (3–3)		23,900	31–46
78	June 29	White Sox	6–3	Floyd (6–5)	Pavano (6–7)		15,645	31–47
79	June 30	White Sox	11–4 (7)	Richard (3–1)	Lee (4–7)		14,793	31–48

July (12–12)

#	Date	Opponent	Score	Win	Loss	Save	Attendance	Record
80	July 1	White Sox	6–2	Contreras (3–7)	Sowers (2–6)		16,722	31–49
81	July 3	Athletics	15–3	Huff (4–3)	Cahill (5–7)		26,557	32–49
82	July 4	Athletics	5–2	Pavano (7–7)	Mazzaro (2–4)	Wood (10)	24,501	33–49
83	July 5	Athletics	5–2	Gonzalez (1–2)	Lee (4–7)	Bailey (9)	19,105	33–50
84	July 7	@ White Sox	10–6	Buehrle (9–2)	Sowers (2–7)		23,758	33–51
85	July 8	@ White Sox	5–1	Contreras (4–7)	Laffey (3–2)		26,772	33–52
86	July 9	@ White Sox	10–8	Sipp (1–0)	Richard (3–3)	Wood (11)	27,257	34–52
87	July 10	@ Tigers	5–1	Jackson (7–4)	Lee (4–9)		35,592	34–53
88	July 11	@ Tigers	5–4	Pavano (8–7)	Galarraga (5–8)	Wood (12)	41,782	35–53
89	July 12	@ Tigers	10–1	Verlander (10–4)	Ohka (0–3)		39,680	35–54
90	July 16	Mariners	4–1	Lee (5–9)	Olson (3–3)		22,371	36–54
91	July 17	Mariners	6–2	Hernández (10–3)	Huff (4–4)		23,545	36–55
92	July 18	Mariners	3–1	Washburn (7–6)	Ohka (0–4)	Aardsma (21)	24,893	36–56
93	July 19	Mariners	5–3	Kelley (2–1)	Betancourt (1–2)	Aardsma (22)	20,900	36–57
94	July 21	@ Blue Jays	2–1	Lee (6–9)	Downs (1–1)		18,330	37–57
95	July 22	@ Blue Jays	10–6	Romero (8–4)	Pavano (8–8)		18,375	37–58
96	July 23	@ Blue Jays	5–4	Huff (5–4)	Rzepczynski (1–2)	Wood (13)	32,061	38–58
97	July 24	@ Mariners	9–0	Laffey (4–2)	Rowland-Smith (0–1)		34,802	39–58
98	July 25	@ Mariners	10–3	Sowers (3–7)	Bédard (5–3)		29,213	40–58
99	July 26	@ Mariners	12–3	Lee (7–9)	Vargas (3–4)		30,224	41–58
100	July 27	@ Angels	8–6	Veras (4–1)	Fuentes (1–3)	Wood (14)	35,371	42–58
101	July 28	@ Angels	7–6	Palmer (9–1)	Huff (5–5)	Bulger (1)	43,270	42–59
102	July 29	@ Angels	9–3	Lackey (7–4)	Laffey (4–3)		39,196	42–60
103	July 31	Tigers	6–5	Ohka (1–4)	Fien (0–1)		35,273	43–60

August (15–12)

#	Date	Opponent	Score	Win	Loss	Save	Attendance	Record
104	August 1	Tigers	4–3 (12)	Seay (2–2)	Veras (4–2)	Miner (1)	31.353	43–61
105	August 2	Tigers	11–1	Pavano (9–8)	Galarraga (5–10)		24,718	44–61
106	August 4	Twins	10–1	Baker (9–7)	Huff (5–6)		17,518	44–62
107	August 5	Twins	8–1	Laffey (5–3)	Liriano (4–11)		17,683	45–62
108	August 6	Twins	2–1	Sipp (2–0)	Blackburn (8–6)	Wood (15)	21,657	46–62
109	August 7	@ White Sox	6–2	Sowers (4–7)	Buehrle (11–6)		27,153	47–62
110	August 8	@ White Sox	8–5	Carrasco (4–2)	Todd (0–1)		35,224	47–63
111	August 9	@ White Sox	8–4	Huff (6–6)	Contreras (4–11)		34,063	48–63
112	August 11	Rangers	5–0	Laffey (6–3)	Nippert (3–1)		21,870	49–63
113	August 12	Rangers	5–0	Hunter (5–2)	Carmona (2–7)		18,794	49–64
114	August 13	Rangers	4–1	Feldman (12–4)	Sowers (4–8)	Francisco (16)	20,090	49–65
115	August 14	@ Twins	11–0	Baker (10–7)	Masterson (3–4)		34,845	49–66
116	August 15	@ Twins	7–3	Huff (7–6)	Swarzak (3–6)		33,931	50–66
117	August 16	@ Twins	7–4	Laffey (7–3)	Blackburn (8–8)		30,260	51–66
118	August 18	Angels	5–4	Bell (1–0)	Carmona (2–7)	Fuentes (35)	18,341	51–67
119	August 19	Angels	3–0	Weaver (13–4)	Sowers (4–9)		16,868	51–68
120	August 20	Angels	11–3	Masterson (4–4)	Lackey (8–6)		16,804	52–68
121	August 21	Mariners	9–4	French (3–3)	Huff (7–7)		28,503	52–69
122	August 22	Mariners	4–3	Pérez (2–2)	Messenger (0–1)		28,942	53–69
123	August 23	Mariners	6–1	Carmona (3–7)	Hernández (12–5)		23,086	54–69
124	August 24	@ Royals	10–6	Sowers (5–9)	Soria (3–2)		11,101	55–69
125	August 25	@ Royals	6–2	Greinke (12–8)	Masterson (4–5)		17,353	55–70
126	August 26	@ Royals	4–2	Huff (8–7)	Hochevar (6–7)	Wood (16)	10,751	56–70
127	August 27	@ Orioles	5–4	Pérez (3–2)	Johnson (3–5)	Wood (17)	13,991	57–70
128	August 28	@ Orioles	13–4	Berken (4–11)	Carmona (3–9)		13,961	57–71
129	August 29	@ Orioles	5–3	Pérez (4–2)	Ray (0–2)	C. Perez (1)	24,358	58–71
130	August 30	@ Orioles	5–2	Matusz (3–2)	Masterson (4–6)	Johnson (7)	20,643	58–72

September/October (7–26)

#	Date	Opponent	Score	Win	Loss	Save	Attendance	Record
131	September 1	@ Tigers	8–5	Jackson (11–6)	Carrasco (0–1)	Rodney (30)	24,225	58–73
132	September 2	@ Tigers	4–2	Porcello (12–8)	Laffey (7–4)	Rodney (31)	25,840	58–74
133	September 3	@ Tigers	4–3 (10)	Miner (6–4)	Pérez (4–3)		28,267	58–75
134	September 4	Twins	5–2	Sowers (6–9)	Pavano (10–11)	Wood (18)	24,402	59–75
135	September 5	Twins	4–1	Baker (13–7)	Masterson (4–7)	Nathan (36)	19,455	59–76
136	September 6	Twins	3–1	Huff (9–7)	Blackburn (9–10)	Wood (19)	17,911	60–76
	September 7	Rangers	Postponed (rain); rescheduled for September 8					
137	September 8	Rangers	11–9	Feliz (1–0)	Lewis (2–4)			60–77
138	September 8	Rangers	10–5	McCarthy (7–2)	Laffey (7–5)		12,976	60–78
139	September 9	Rangers	10–0	Feldman (16–4)	Carmona (3–10)		14,637	60–79
140	September 11	Royals	2–1	Wright (2–5)	Veras (4–3)	Soria (25)	26,006	60–80
141	September 12	Royals	13–6	Huff (10–7)	Hochevar (6–10)		24,842	61–80
142	September 13	Royals	7–0	Davies (8–9)	Carrasco (0–2)		21,153	61–81
143	September 14	@ Twins	6–3	Mahay (2–1)	C. Perez (0–1)	Nathan (39)	20,640	61–82
144	September 15	@ Twins	5–4	Rauch (3–1)	Carmona (3–11)	Nathan (40)	19,035	61–83
145	September 16	@ Twins	7–3	Blackburn (10–11)	Laffey (7–6)	Nathan (41)	16,921	61–84
146	September 17	@ Athletics	5–2	Mortensen (2–2)	Masterson (4–8)	Bailey (25)	10,873	61–85
147	September 18	@ Athletics	2–1	Anderson (10–10)	Huff (10–8)	Ziegler (7)	22,893	61–86
148	September 19	@ Athletics	8–4	Kilby (1–0)	Sowers (6–10)	Wuertz (4)	17,209	61–86
149	September 20	@ Athletics	11–4	Eveland (2–3)	Carmona (3–12)		15,430	61–87
150	September 22	Tigers	3–1	Jackson (13–7)	Laffey (7–7)	Rodney (34)	23,217	61–88
151	September 23	Tigers	11–3	Porcello (14–9)	Masterson (4–9)		13,971	61–89
152	September 24	Tigers	6–5	Verlander (17–9)	Carrasco (0–3)	Rodney (35)	23,516	61–90
153	September 25	Orioles	4–2	Carmona (4–12)	Hernandez (4–9)	Wood (20)	33,472	62–90
154	September 26	Orioles	9–8	Wood (3–3)	Johnson (4–6)		31,749	63–90
155	September 27	Orioles	9–0	Huff (11–8)	Tillman (2–5)		29,930	64–90
156	September 28	White Sox	6–1	Danks (13–10)	Laffey (7–8)		23,088	64–91
	September 29	White Sox	Postponed (rain) Rescheduled for September 30					
157	September 30	White Sox	5–1	Carmona (5–12)	Torres (1–2)			65–92
158	September 30	White Sox	1–0	Buehrle (13–10)	Masterson (4–10)	Thornton (4)	16,871	65–93
159	October 1	@ Red Sox	3–0	Lester (15–8)	Carrasco (0–4)	Papelbon (38)	37,459	65–94
160	October 2	@ Red Sox	6–2	Matsuzaka (4–6)	Sowers (6–11)		37,787	65–95
161	October 3	@ Red Sox	11–6	Beckett (17–6)	Laffey (7–9)		37,562	65–96
162	October 4	@ Red Sox	12–7	Bowden (1–1)	Ohka (1–5)		37,247	65–97

== Player stats ==
=== Batting ===
Note: G = Games played; AB = At bats; R = Runs scored; H = Hits; 2B = Doubles; 3B = Triples; HR = Home runs; RBI = Runs batted in; AVG = Batting average; SB = Stolen bases

Player	G	AB	R	H	2B	3B	HR	RBI	AVG	SB
Greg Aquino	2	0	0	0	0	0	0	0	—	0
Josh Barfield	17	20	5	8	1	0	0	2	.400	0
Rafael Betancourt	2	0	0	0	0	0	0	0	—	0
Michael Brantley	28	112	10	35	4	0	0	11	.313	4
Asdrúbal Cabrera	131	523	81	161	42	4	6	68	.308	17
Jamey Carroll	93	315	53	87	10	2	2	26	.276	4
Shin-Soo Choo	156	583	87	175	38	6	20	86	.300	21
Trevor Crowe	68	183	22	43	9	3	1	17	.235	6
Mark DeRosa	71	278	47	75	13	0	13	50	.270	1
David Dellucci	14	40	3	11	3	0	0	1	.275	0
Ben Francisco	89	308	48	77	21	1	10	33	.250	13
Ryan Garko	78	239	29	68	10	0	11	39	.285	0
Chris Gimenez	45	111	12	16	2	0	3	7	.144	1
Mike Gosling	1	0	0	0	0	0	0	0	—	0
Tony Graffanino	7	23	1	3	1	0	0	0	.130	0
Travis Hafner	94	338	46	92	19	0	16	49	.272	0
Matt Herges	5	0	0	0	0	0	0	0	—	0
David Huff	2	2	0	0	0	0	0	0	.000	0
Matt LaPorta	52	181	29	46	13	0	7	21	.254	2
Aaron Laffey	1	0	0	0	0	0	0	0	—	0
Cliff Lee	3	5	0	0	0	0	0	0	.000	0
Jensen Lewis	4	1	0	0	0	0	0	0	.000	0
Lou Marson	14	44	6	11	6	0	0	4	.250	0
Andy Marte	47	155	20	36	6	1	6	25	.232	0
Victor Martinez	99	377	56	107	21	1	15	65	.284	0
Tomo Ohka	1	2	0	0	0	0	0	0	.000	0
Carl Pavano	1	2	0	0	0	0	0	0	.000	0
Jhonny Peralta	151	582	57	148	35	1	11	83	.254	0
Rafael Perez	4	1	0	0	0	0	0	0	.000	0
Anthony Reyes	1	1	0	0	0	0	0	0	.000	0
Niuman Romero	10	14	2	2	0	0	0	0	.143	0
Kelly Shoppach	89	271	33	58	14	0	12	40	.214	0
Tony Sipp	1	0	0	0	0	0	0	0	—	0
Grady Sizemore	106	436	73	108	20	6	18	64	.248	13
Joe Smith	4	0	0	0	0	0	0	0	—	0
Jeremy Sowers	1	2	0	0	0	0	0	0	.000	0
Wyatt Toregas	19	51	1	9	1	0	0	6	.176	0
Luis Valbuena	103	368	52	92	25	3	10	31	.250	2
Luis Vizcaíno	3	0	0	0	0	0	0	0	—	0
Kerry Wood	4	0	0	0	0	0	0	0	—	0
Team totals	162	5568	773	1468	314	28	161	730	.264	84

=== Pitching ===
Note: W = Wins; L = Losses; ERA = Earned run average; G = Games pitched; GS = Games started; SV = Saves; IP = Innings pitched; H = Hits allowed; R = Runs allowed; ER = Earned runs allowed; BB = Walks allowed; K = Strikeouts

Player	W	L	ERA	G	GS	SV	IP	H	R	ER	BB	K
Winston Abreu	0	0	23.14	3	0	0	2.1	7	7	6	2	3
Greg Aquino	1	2	4.50	10	0	0	16.0	13	8	8	15	11
Rafael Betancourt	1	2	3.52	29	0	1	30.2	25	15	12	15	32
Fausto Carmona	5	12	6.32	24	24	0	125.1	151	97	88	70	79
Carlos Carrasco	0	4	8.87	5	5	0	22.1	40	23	22	11	11
Vinnie Chulk	0	1	3.75	8	0	0	12.0	10	6	5	10	4
Mike Gosling	0	0	5.04	15	0	0	25.0	30	15	14	11	13
Matt Herges	2	1	3.55	21	0	0	25.1	24	10	10	6	18
David Huff	11	8	5.61	23	23	0	128.1	159	82	80	41	65
Zach Jackson	0	0	9.35	3	1	0	8.2	14	10	9	4	10
Masahide Kobayashi	0	0	8.38	10	0	0	9.2	12	9	9	4	4
Aaron Laffey	7	9	4.44	25	19	1	121.2	140	69	60	57	59
Jensen Lewis	2	4	4.61	47	0	1	66.1	62	37	34	29	62
Scott Lewis	0	0	8.31	1	1	0	4.1	7	4	4	1	3
Justin Masterson	1	7	4.55	11	10	0	57.1	56	35	29	35	52
Tomo Ohka	1	5	5.96	18	6	0	71.0	77	47	47	19	31
Carl Pavano	9	8	5.37	21	21	0	125.2	150	80	75	23	88
Chris Perez	0	1	4.32	32	0	1	33.1	24	16	16	12	38
Rafael Perez	4	3	7.31	54	0	0	48.0	66	41	39	25	32
Anthony Reyes	1	1	6.57	8	8	0	38.1	40	30	28	23	22
Rich Rundles	0	0	0.00	1	0	0	1.0	1	0	0	1	1
Tony Sipp	2	0	2.93	46	0	0	40.0	27	16	13	25	48
Joe Smith	0	0	3.44	37	0	0	34.0	30	16	13	13	30
Jeremy Sowers	6	11	5.25	23	22	0	123.1	134	73	72	52	51
Jess Todd	0	1	7.40	19	0	0	20.2	31	17	17	7	18
José Veras	1	2	4.38	22	0	0	24.2	19	16	12	14	22
Luis Vizcaíno	1	3	5.40	11	0	1	11.2	8	7	7	12	9
Kerry Wood	3	3	4.25	58	0	20	55.0	48	26	26	28	63
Team totals	65	97	5.06	162	162	25	1434.0	1570	865	806	598	986

== Minor league affiliates ==
Classification level	Team	League	Season article
AAA	Columbus Clippers	International League	2009 Columbus Clippers season
AA	Akron Aeros	Eastern League	2009 Akron Aeros season
Advanced A	Kinston Indians	Carolina League	
A	Lake County Captains	South Atlantic League	
Short Season A	Mahoning Valley Scrappers	New York–Penn League	
Rookie	Gulf Coast Indians	Gulf Coast League	
Rookie	DSL Indians	Dominican Summer League	
