= 2009 Kansas City Royals season =

2009 Kansas City Royals
- League: American League
- Division: Central
- Ballpark: Kauffman Stadium
- City: Kansas City, Missouri
- Record: 65–97 (.401)
- Divisional place: tied for 4th
- Owners: David Glass
- General managers: Dayton Moore
- Managers: Trey Hillman
- Television: Fox Sports Kansas City (Ryan Lefebvre, Bob Davis, Paul Splittorff, Frank White)
- Radio: KCSP 610 AM (Denny Matthews, Ryan Lefebvre, Steve Stewart, Bob Davis)

The 2009 Kansas City Royals season was the 41st season for the franchise, and their 37th at Kauffman Stadium. The season began on April 7 with a game against the Chicago White Sox at U. S. Cellular Field, which Chicago won. On April 10, the Royals hosted the New York Yankees in the first game at the newly renovated Kauffman Stadium for the Royals' home opener. Interleague opponents included the St. Louis Cardinals, Arizona Diamondbacks, Cincinnati Reds, Houston Astros and Pittsburgh Pirates.

The Royals looked to improve on their 2008 record of 75–87 and sought their first playoff appearance since 1985, as manager Trey Hillman returned for his second season with Kansas City. The Royals' payroll for the 2009 season was $70.5 million, approximately 25 percent higher than their 2008 payroll (and 21st in the major leagues).

There was much optimism for the Royals heading into the season, with some experts saying they had the potential reach the postseason. After a strong start and 18–11 record, the Royals suffered several losing streaks and fell back to a losing record, finishing with a dismal 65–97 record.

== Off-season ==
=== Coaching staff changes ===
Following the 2008 season, third base coach Luis Silverio and hitting coach Mike Barnett were not retained on Trey Hillman's coaching staff. In October 2008, the Royals hired Kevin Seitzer as the team's new hitting coach and John Gibbons as bench coach. Seitzer served as the hitting coach for the Arizona Diamondbacks in 2008, and Gibbons was the manager of the Toronto Blue Jays for five seasons. Both were dismissed from their respective teams before the 2007 season was completed. Dave Owen, the team's bench coach from 2008, will be the third base coach. Bob McClure (pitching), Rusty Kuntz (first base), and John Mizerock (bullpen) were all retained to complete the six-man staff.

=== Winter meetings ===
After the acquisitions of Mike Jacobs and Coco Crisp, the Royals entered the Winter Meetings not seeking to add another big free agent acquisition like in years past (Gil Meche in 2007 and José Guillén in 2008). Through trades, Kansas City sought to acquire relief pitching, a middle infielder, and a starting pitcher. The Royals pursued both RHP Kyle Farnsworth and RHP Brandon Lyon, and signed Farnsworth to a two-year contract. The Royals also signed LHP Horacio Ramírez, who was previously with the team in 2008, and RHP Doug Waechter.

The Royals were also one of the final four teams that were in talks with SS Rafael Furcal. The acquisition of Furcal would have resulted in the Royals moving SS Mike Avilés to second base. Furcal played with the Atlanta Braves, where Royals general manager Dayton Moore worked prior to joining the Royals' front office. Reports said that Kansas City was maneuvering to clear payroll so that they could sign Furcal, or sign Orlando Cabrera, who was in the Royals' backup plan. Kansas City bowed out of talks with Furcal after they could not work around their payroll.

The Boston Globe reported that the Royals had "serious discussions" concerning a trade of RHP Zack Greinke to the Atlanta Braves for OF Jeff Francoeur. Reports about Kansas City's purported interest in Francoeur also surfaced weeks before the Winter Meetings but there had been no concrete evidence that the Royals pursued such a deal. Dayton Moore quickly denied the report. Moore showed a reluctance to trade Greinke or outfielders Mark Teahen and David DeJesus, all of whom were attached to rumors throughout the off-season.

=== Roster moves ===
Royals players eligible for arbitration

Kansas City entered the 2008–2009 off-season with 15 players eligible for arbitration.

- LHP John Bale (re-signed)
- RHP Brian Bannister
- C John Buck
- RHP Kyle Davies
- RHP Brandon Duckworth
- OF Joey Gathright (released)
- IF/OF Esteban Germán
- LHP Jimmy Gobble
- RHP Zack Greinke
- 2B Mark Grudzielanek (declined)
- 1B Mike Jacobs
- C Miguel Olivo
- RHP Joel Peralta
- IF Jason Smith
- IF/OF Mark Teahen

In October, the Royals acquired 1B Mike Jacobs from the Florida Marlins in exchange for SP Leo Núñez.

In November, the Royals acquired CF Coco Crisp from the Boston Red Sox in exchange for RP Ramón Ramírez.

In December, the Royals did not tender contracts to OF Joey Gathright, LHP John Bale, RHP Jairo Cuevas, and 2B Jason Smith. Bale was later re-signed on a one-year deal,

In January, the Royals agreed to a four-year, $38 million contract with RHP Zack Greinke.

== Regular season ==
=== Season standings ===
AL Central
Team	W	L	Pct.	GB	Home	Road
Minnesota Twins	87	76	.534	—	49‍–‍33	38‍–‍43
Detroit Tigers	86	77	.528	1	51‍–‍30	35‍–‍47
Chicago White Sox	79	83	.488	7½	43‍–‍38	36‍–‍45
Cleveland Indians	65	97	.401	21½	35‍–‍46	30‍–‍51
Kansas City Royals	65	97	.401	21½	33‍–‍48	32‍–‍49

=== Record vs. opponents ===
2009 American League record Source: MLB Standings Grid – 2009
Team	BAL	BOS	CWS	CLE	DET	KC	LAA	MIN	NYY	OAK	SEA	TB	TEX	TOR	NL
Baltimore	–	2–16	5–4	2–5	3–5	4–4	2–8	3–2	5–13	1–5	4–5	8–10	5–5	9–9	11–7
Boston	16–2	–	4–4	7–2	6–1	5–3	4–5	4–2	9–9	5–5	2–4	9–9	2–7	11–7	11–7
Chicago	4–5	4−4	–	10–8	9–9	9–9	5–4	6−12	3–4	4–5	4–5	6–2	2–4	1–6	12–6
Cleveland	5–2	2–7	8–10	–	4–14	10–8	2–4	8–10	3–5	2–5	6–4	5–3	1–8	4–4	5–13
Detroit	5–3	1–6	9–9	14–4	–	9–9	5–4	7–12	1–5	5–4	5–4	5–2	7–2	3–5	10–8
Kansas City	4–4	3–5	9–9	8–10	9–9	–	1–9	6–12	2–4	2–6	5–4	1–9	3–3	4–3	8–10
Los Angeles	8–2	5–4	4–5	4–2	4–5	9–1	–	6–4	5–5	12–7	10–9	4–2	8–11	4–4	14–4
Minnesota	2–3	2–4	12–6	10–8	12–7	12–6	4–6	–	0–7	4–6	5–5	3–3	6–4	3–5	12–6
New York	13–5	9–9	4–3	5–3	5–1	4–2	5–5	7–0	–	7–2	6–4	11–7	5–4	12–6	10–8
Oakland	5–1	5–5	5–4	5–2	4–5	6–2	7–12	6–4	2–7	–	5–14	6–4	11–8	3–6	5–13
Seattle	5–4	4–2	5–4	4–6	4–5	4–5	9–10	5–5	4–6	14–5	–	5–3	8–11	3–4	11–7
Tampa Bay	10–8	9–9	2–6	3–5	2–5	9–1	2–4	3–3	7–11	4–6	3–5	–	3–6	14–4	13–5
Texas	5–5	7–2	4–2	8–1	2–7	3–3	11–8	4–6	4–5	8–11	11–8	6–3	–	5–5	9–9
Toronto	9–9	7–11	6–1	4–4	5–3	3–4	4–4	5–3	6–12	6–3	4–3	4–14	5–5	–	7–11

- Source: MLB Standings Grid – 2009

== Monthly summaries ==
=== April ===
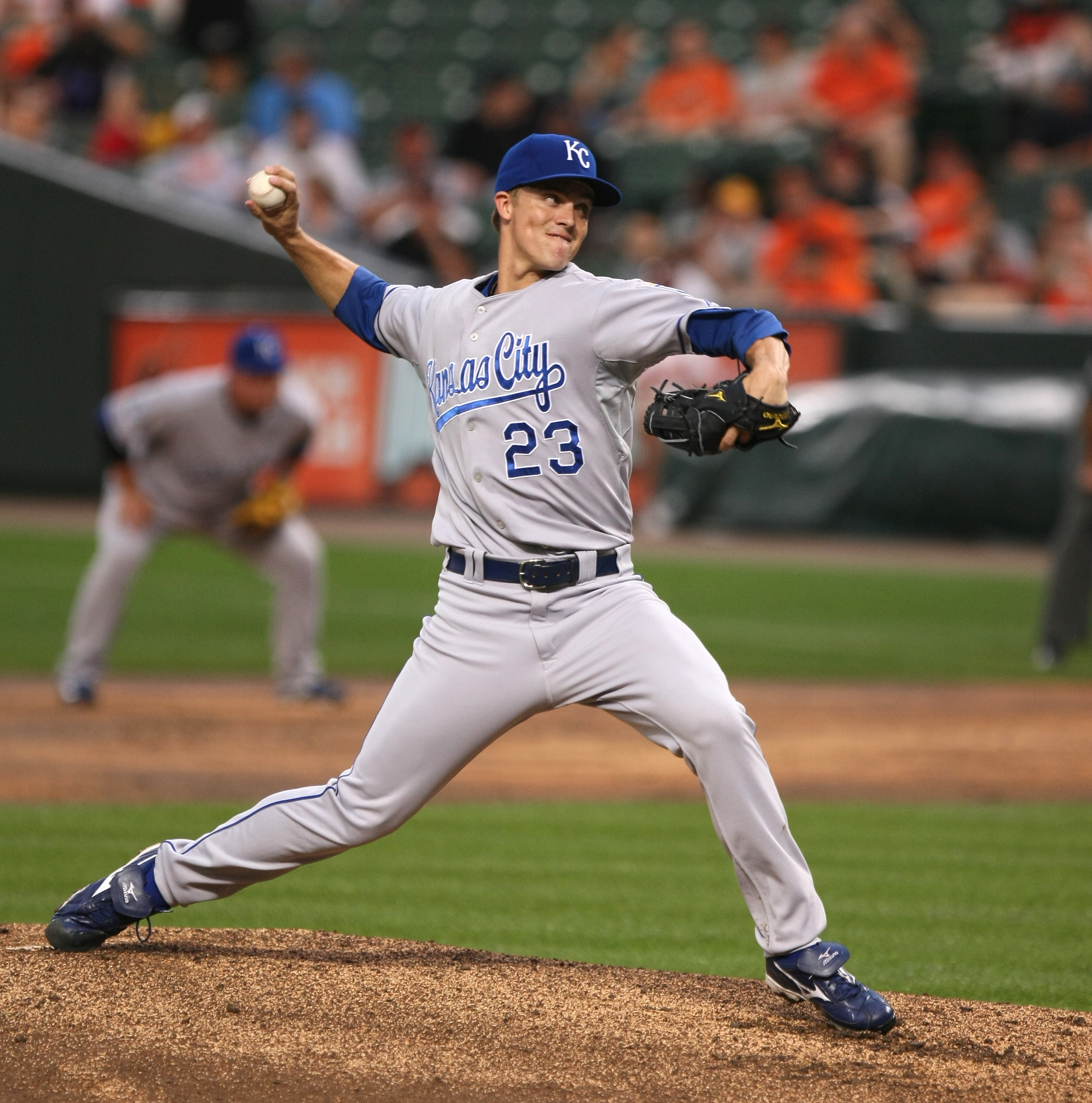
Zack Greinke finished the month of April with a 5–0 record and 0.50 ERA. He won Pitcher of the Month honors and was featured on Sports Illustrated.

The Royals' season opener against the Chicago White Sox was originally scheduled for April 6 but was postponed due to snow forecasts in the Chicago area. The game was rescheduled for April 7, which was originally an off-day for both teams. The Royals lost the first game of the season after Kyle Farnsworth gave up a game-losing, three-run homer to Chicago's Jim Thome. After losing the first game to Chicago, the Royals won two of three games against Chicago to open the series. The Royals played the New York Yankees on April 10 at the newly renovated Kauffman Stadium for their home opener. It was the first game of a three-game series. Kansas City lost the first two games and trailed late in the 8th inning of the third game before Brayan Peña scored a game-tying RBI double and then scored the go-ahead run on Alberto Callaspo's RBI single. Peña is the team's third-string catcher and was listed as designated hitter for the day. The Royals would hold on to the 6–4 lead for their third win on the season.

On April 17 the Royals began a three-game series with the Texas Rangers and eventually won two of them. On that day, 3B Alex Gordon was placed on the disabled list and was ruled out for at least two months after having surgery to repair a torn labrum in his right hip. Despite the bad news, the Royals beat the Rangers 12–3 in the opening game of the series. In the second game against the Rangers (on April 18), RHP Zack Greinke recorded his first career shut-out and extended his scoreless inning streak to 34. The streak dated back to the 2008 Kansas City Royals season. This brought Greinke's statistics to three wins in three starts and an 0.00 ERA, the best in the American League at the time. Texas' Kevin Millwood, who started for the Rangers, had the American League's second lowest ERA entering the game with a 0.64 ERA. The Royals entered the third game of the series against Texas looking for their first series sweep of the season. After trailing 5–3 in the bottom of the eighth, the Rangers tied the game at 5 by the ninth inning after Royals set up pitchers Ron Mahay and Jamie Wright allowed two runs. Texas' Michael Young hit a game-winning leadoff home run off of reliever Kyle Farnsworth's second pitch of the inning. The loss brought Kansas City down to a three-way tie for first place in the American League Central with Detroit and Chicago. Royals manager Trey Hillman kept closer Joakim Soria in the bullpen for the entire series instead reasoning that he didn't want Soria to be used for more than one inning in the third game. RHP Brian Bannister was recalled from Triple-A Omaha to pitch for Kansas City on April 22 and replaced both the injured Doug Waechter, who was placed on the DL, and the struggling Horacio Ramírez in the pitching rotation. Bannister and Jamie Wright pitched eight shut-out innings before closer Joakim Soria returned from an eight-day hiatus to close out the 2–0 victory. Soria battled injuries for most of the month.

Zack Greinke's scoreless innings streak ended at 38 when an unearned run was scored after an errant throw by Mike Avilés in a 6–1 Royals victory over the Detroit Tigers. The run was unearned so Greinke's ERA stayed at 0.00 and his record improved to 4–0 on the season. The game was also Greinke's second complete game of the season. Greinke was featured on the cover of Sports Illustrated's May 4, 2009, issue (Volume 110, Issue 18) for a cover story by Joe Posnanski called "The Best Pitcher in Baseball." Greinke is the first Royals player to appear on the magazine cover since pitcher David Cone on April 5, 1993, for the magazine's baseball preview. The last Kansas City player to appear in an in-season cover was back on June 12, 1989, when SI featured outfielder Bo Jackson.

The team won three of four games against the Toronto Blue Jays, who entered the series with baseball's best record. On April 29 Zack Greinke was the first pitcher of the season to record his fifth win and allowed only two runs to the Blue Jays in an 11–3 victory. This brought his ERA for the season from 0.00 to 0.50. By finishing with a 12–10 record for the month, the Royals registered their first winning April since 2003 when they began the season with a 16–7 record.

=== May ===
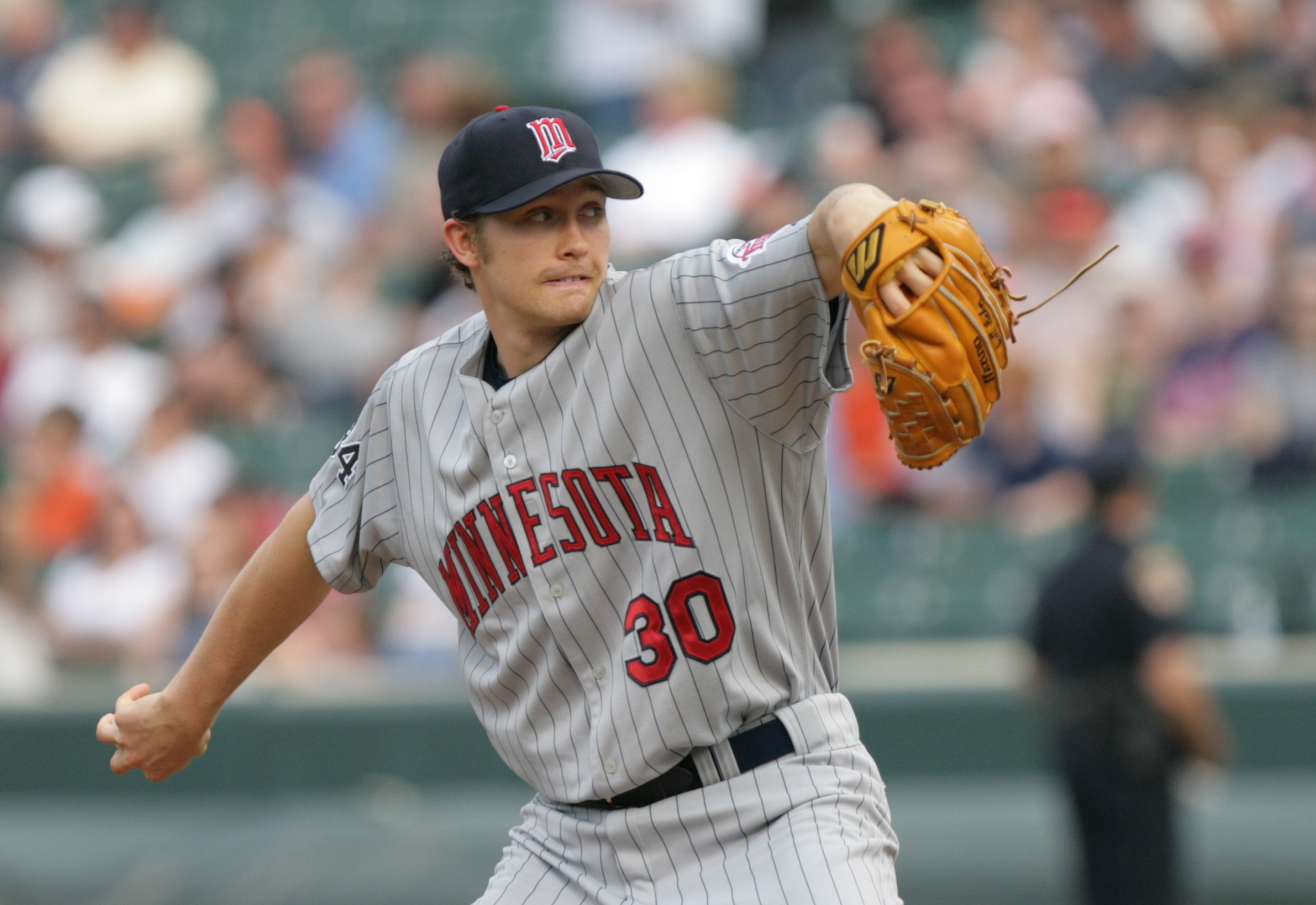
Twins pitcher Scott Baker held the Royals scoreless through six innings on May 3 but the Royals tallied seven runs once he left the game.

The Royals entered the month of May in sole-possession of first place in the American League Central. They traveled to the Hubert H. Humphrey Metrodome to play the Minnesota Twins in a three-game series to start off the month. The series was hotly contested with the Royals scoring 22 runs and the Twins scoring 19 and several lead changes. The second game of the series was decided in 11 innings. In the third game, the Royals were no-hit by Scott Baker through six innings before an offensive but then suddenly unleashed an offensive flurry in the seventh, scoring five runs to roar ahead and hold on for a stunning 7–5 victory. Zack Greinke threw his third complete game in a 3–0 shutout of the White Sox on May 4 and improved his record to 6–0 on the year with a 0.40 ERA. Greinke lost his first game of the season to the Los Angeles Angels of Anaheim on May 9 in a 1–0 loss. Greinke pitched a complete game and his ERA rose to 0.51.

Joakim Soria continued to battle injuries to his shoulder and his appearances were limited in the early part of May. He was placed on the disabled list and Sidney Ponson was sent to the bullpen in exchange for Luke Hochevar being called up from Triple-A Omaha. In his first appearance of the season, Hochevar lasted only two innings and allowed eight runs in a 12–3 loss to the Oakland Athletics. Entering the game, Kansas City's team ERA led the American League, but took a hit with Hochevar's performance. By the beginning of the fifth inning, Oakland led the game 12–0 and the Royals never recovered and dropped their fourth consecutive game. The Royals lost all five games of their road trip against the Angels and Athletics after sweeping their four-game homestand against the White Sox and Mariners.

Zack Greinke's eighth start of the season was delayed by two and half hours of rainfall, but the Royals still won the game 8–1 against the Baltimore Orioles. The game was held at Kauffman Stadium and had a sell-out crowd of 38,353 along with many other games in the season selling out for Greinke's starts. The Royals split their four-game home series against the Orioles.

On May 19, Kansas City trailed Cleveland 5–2 entering the ninth inning but accomplished their biggest comeback victory of the season. After two consecutive home runs by Mike Jacobs and Mark Teahen, the Royals rallied to a 6–5 victory after a sacrifice fly by Willie Bloomquist brought David DeJesus home for the winning run.

Kansas City began Interleague play against their cross-state rival St. Louis Cardinals. After losing the first two games of the series by scores of 5–0, the Royals fell to a 21–22 record and under the .500 mark for the first time since April 11 when they were 2–3. After optioning three players (Mike Avilés, Luke Hochevar, and Robinson Tejeda) to the inactive roster, Kansas City won the final game 3–2 and regained a .500 record on the season.

By the end of the month, the Royals began to slip from the top of their division standings in the American League Central, especially following a three-game sweep by the Chicago White Sox left the team with a 23–27 record. An 11–17 record in May dropped the Royals down to fourth place in the division.

=== June ===
Looking to rebound from a sub-par month of May, the Royals began June with a three-game series at Tampa Bay on June 2, but continued to flounder, dropping all three games. They lost their eighth game in a row on June 5 at Toronto, but broke the losing streak the next day thanks to a strong performance from Luke Hochevar. In the 2009 Major League Baseball draft held on June 9 the Royals selected RHP Aaron Crow with the 12th overall selection. Crow attended the University of Missouri, was born in nearby Topeka, Kansas, and was a longtime Royals fan prior to being selected with the team. That same day, the Royals' defense and bullpen allowed eight unanswered runs to the Indians in an 8–4 loss. The loss dropped the Royals to fifth place in the American League Central.

=== Roster ===
2009 Kansas City Royals
Roster
Pitchers: 49 John Bale; 19 Brian Bannister; 52 Bruce Chen; 56 Román Colón; 37 Juan Cruz; 28 Kyle Davies; 41 Lenny DiNardo; 40 Kyle Farnsworth; 23 Zack Greinke; 44 Luke Hochevar; 31 Dusty Hughes; 54 Anthony Lerew; 32 Ron Mahay; 47 Víctor Marté; 55 Gil Meche; 47 Sidney Ponson; 52 Horacio Ramírez; 53 Carlos Rosa; 48 Joakim Soria; 51 Robinson Tejeda; 45 Doug Waechter; 34 Jamey Wright; 57 Yasuhiko Yabuta	Catchers: 14 John Buck; 21 Miguel Olivo; 27 Brayan Peña; Infielders: 30 Mike Avilés; 3 Yuniesky Betancourt; 16 Billy Butler; 13 Alberto Callaspo; 4 Alex Gordon; 46 Luis Hernández; 7 Tug Hulett; 17 Mike Jacobs; 1 Tony Peña Jr.; 24 Mark Teahen; Outfielders: 1 Josh Anderson; 8 Willie Bloomquist; 2 Coco Crisp; 9 David DeJesus; 26 Ryan Freel; 11 José Guillén; 35 Mitch Maier	Manager: 22 Trey Hillman; Coaches: 12 John Gibbons (bench); 18 Rusty Kuntz (first base); 33 Bob McClure (pitching); 50 John Mizerock (bullpen); 6 Dave Owen (third base); 36 Kevin Seitzer (hitting)

=== Game log ===
2009 game log
April (12–10)

#	Date	Opponent	Score	Win	Loss	Save	Attendance	Record
	April 6	@ White Sox	Postponed					
1	April 7	@ White Sox	4–2	Dotel (1–0)	Farnsworth (0–1)	Jenks (1)	37,449	0–1
2	April 8	@ White Sox	2–0	Greinke (1–0)	Floyd (0–1)	Soria (1)	22,817	1–1
3	April 9	@ White Sox	2–1	Mahay (1–0)	Jenks (0–1)	Soria (2)	18,091	2–1
4	April 10	Yankees	4–1	Pettitte (1–0)	Ponson (0–1)	Rivera (1)	38,098	2–2
5	April 11	Yankees	6–1	Sabathia (1–1)	Ramírez (0–1)		31,271	2–3
6	April 12	Yankees	6–4	Cruz (1–0)	Coke (0–1)	Soria (3)	17,629	3–3
7	April 13	Indians	4–2	Greinke (2–0)	Carmona (0–2)	Soria (4)	10,061	4–3
8	April 14	Indians	9–3	Davies (1–0)	Pavano (0–2)		11,756	5–3
9	April 15	Indians	5–4	Lewis (1–0)	Farnsworth (0–2)	Wood (1)	13,589	5–4
10	April 17	@ Rangers	12–3	Meche (1–0)	Harrison (0–2)		24,062	6–4
11	April 18	@ Rangers	2–0	Greinke (3–0)	Millwood (1–1)		37,635	7–4
12	April 19	@ Rangers	6–5	Francisco (1–0)	Farnsworth (0–3)		27,635	7–5
13	April 21	@ Indians	8–7	Laffey (1–0)	Ponson (0–2)	Wood (2)	11,408	7–6
14	April 22	@ Indians	2–0	Bannister (1–0)	Lee (1–3)	Soria (5)	13,509	8–6
15	April 23	@ Indians	5–2	Lewis (2–2)	Meche (1–1)	Wood (3)	12,852	8–7
16	April 24	Tigers	6–1	Greinke (4–0)	Porcello (1–2)		36,363	9–7
17	April 25	Tigers	9–1	Miner (2–1)	Davies (1–1)		37,647	9–8
18	April 26	Tigers	3–2	Galarraga (3–0)	Ponson (0–3)	Rodney (4)	13,520	9–9
19	April 27	Blue Jays	7–1	Bannister (2–0)	Purcey (0–2)		9,685	10–9
20	April 28	Blue Jays	8–1	Richmond (3–0)	Meche (1–2)		15,191	10–10
21	April 29	Blue Jays	11–3	Greinke (5–0)	Tallet (1–1)		10,619	11–10
22	April 30	Blue Jays	8–6	Davies (2–1)	Burres (0–2)	Cruz (1)	11,896	12–10

May (11–17)

#	Date	Opponent	Score	Win	Loss	Save	Attendance	Record
23	May 1	@ Twins	7–5	Slowey (4–0)	Ponson (0–4)	Nathan (4)	24,727	12–11
24	May 2	@ Twins	10–7 (11)	Soria (1–0)	Breslow (0–1)		29,061	13–11
25	May 3	@ Twins	7–5	Meche (2–2)	Baker (0–4)	Soria (6)	31,845	14–11
26	May 4	White Sox	3–0	Greinke (6–0)	Colón (2–2)		21,843	15–11
27	May 5	White Sox	8–7 (11)	Cruz (2–0)	Broadway (0–1)		13,419	16–11
28	May 6	Mariners	9–1	Ponson (1–4)	Silva (1–3)		15,324	17–11
29	May 7	Mariners	3–1	Bannister (3–0)	Washburn (3–2)	Soria (7)	32,714	18–11
30	May 8	@ Angels	4–1	Palmer (3–0)	Meche (2–3)	Fuentes (8)	41,019	18–12
31	May 9	@ Angels	1–0	Saunders (5–1)	Greinke (6–1)		39,776	18–13
32	May 10	@ Angels	4–3	Shields (1–2)	Wright (0–1)	Fuentes (9)	43,646	18–14
33	May 12	@ Athletics	12–3	Cahill (2–2)	Hochevar (0–1)		10,156	18–15
34	May 13	@ Athletics	7–2	Outman (1–0)	Bannister (3–1)		16,057	18–16
35	May 14	Orioles	9–5	Guthrie (3–3)	Meche (2–4)		24,431	18–17
36	May 15	Orioles	8–1	Greinke (7–1)	Eaton (2–4)		38,353	19–17
37	May 16	Orioles	3–2	Hill (1–0)	Davies (2–2)	Sherrill (7)	26,720	19–18
38	May 17	Orioles	7–4	Cruz (3–0)	Johnson (2–2)		22,791	20–18
39	May 19	Indians	6–5	Farnsworth (1–3)	Wood (1–2)		25,024	21–18
40	May 20	Indians	6–5	Laffey (3–0)	Ponson (1–5)	Wood (6)	19,652	21–19
41	May 21	Indians	8–3	Pavano (4–4)	Ramírez (0–2)	Betancourt (1)	23,095	21–20
42	May 22	@ Cardinals	5–0	Wellemeyer (4–4)	Davies (2–3)		43,429	21–21
43	May 23	@ Cardinals	5–0	Lohse (4–3)	Hochevar (0–2)		43,829	21–22
44	May 24	@ Cardinals	3–2	Bannister (4–1)	Piñeiro (5–4)	Cruz (2)	44,213	22–22
45	May 25	Tigers	13–1	Verlander (5–2)	Meche (2–5)		34,524	22–23
46	May 26	Tigers	6–1	Greinke (8–1)	Jackson (4–3)		16,366	23–23
47	May 27	Tigers	8–3	Porcello (6–3)	Davies (2–4)		16,568	23–24
48	May 29	White Sox	11–2	Richard (2–0)	Bannister (4–2)		26,495	23–25
49	May 30	White Sox	5–3	Linebrink (2–2)	Cruz (3–1)	Jenks (11)	37,894	23–26
50	May 31	White Sox	7–4	Thornton (2–1)	Bale (0–1)	Jenks (12)	19,855	23–27

June (10–16)

#	Date	Opponent	Score	Win	Loss	Save	Attendance	Record
51	June 2	@ Rays	6–2	Sonnanstine (4–5)	Davies (2–5)		13,604	23–28
52	June 3	@ Rays	9–0	Niemann (5–4)	Bannister (4–3)		15,256	23–29
53	June 4	@ Rays	3–2	Shields (5–4)	Wright (0–2)	Howell (2)	16,103	23–30
54	June 5	@ Blue Jays	9–3	Romero (3–2)	Greinke (8–2)		15,435	23–31
55	June 6	@ Blue Jays	6–2	Hochevar (1–2)	Richmond (4–3)		16,552	24–31
56	June 7	@ Blue Jays	4–0	Halladay (10–1)	Davies (2–6)		21,071	24–32
57	June 9	@ Indians	8–4	Pérez (1–1)	Cruz (3–2)		15,038	24–33
58	June 10	@ Indians	9–0	Meche (3–5)	Pavano (6–5)		16,257	25–33
59	June 11	@ Indians	4–3 (10)	Herges (2–0)	Farnsworth (1–4)		14,342	25–34
60	June 12	Reds	4–1	Hochevar (2–2)	Maloney (0–1)		32,959	26–34
61	June 13	Reds	7–4	Davies (3–6)	Arroyo (7–5)		29,574	27–34
62	June 14	Reds	7–1	Bannister (5–3)	Cueto (6–4)		24,525	28–34
63	June 16	Diamondbacks	5–0	Meche (4–5)	Davis (3–8)		26,974	29–34
64	June 17	Diamondbacks	12–5	Scherzer (4–4)	Greinke (8–3)		29,777	29–35
65	June 18	Diamondbacks	12–5	Haren (6–4)	Hochevar (2–3)		14,129	29–36
66	June 19	Cardinals	10–5	Thompson (2–2)	Davies (3–7)		37,660	29–37
67	June 20	Cardinals	7–1	Carpenter (5–1)	Bannister (5–4)	Franklin (17)	38,769	29–38
68	June 21	Cardinals	12–5	Wainwright (8–4)	Meche (4–6)		33,805	29–39
69	June 23	@ Astros	2–1	Greinke (9–3)	Ortiz (3–3)	Soria (8)	30,049	30–39
70	June 24	@ Astros	4–3	Soria (2–0)	Fulchino (2–3)	Bale (1)	28,602	31–39
71	June 25	@ Astros	5–4	Wright (2–1)	Bannister (5–5)	Valverde (6)	32,048	31–40
72	June 26	@ Pirates	5–3	Vasquez (1–0)	Meche (4–7)	Capps (17)	18,458	31–41
73	June 27	@ Pirates	6–2	Maholm (5–4)	Chen (0–1)		36,032	31–42
74	June 28	@ Pirates	3–2	Greinke (10–3)	Morton (0–1)	Soria (9)	25,888	32–42
75	June 29	Twins	4–2	Hochevar (3–3)	Blackburn (6–4)	Soria (10)	22,066	33–42
76	June 30	Twins	2–1	Baker (6–6)	Bannister (5–6)	Nathan (20)	19,310	33–43

July (7–19)

#	Date	Opponent	Score	Win	Loss	Save	Attendance	Record
77	July 1	Twins	5–1	Perkins (4–4)	Meche (4–8)	Nathan (21)	18,906	33–44
78	July 2	White Sox	4–1	Buehrle (8–2)	Chen (0–2)	Jenks (19)	17,964	33–45
79	July 3	White Sox	5–0	Danks (7–6)	Greinke (10–4)	Linebrink (2)	39,026	33–46
80	July 4	White Sox	6–4	Hochevar (4–3)	Floyd (6–6)	Soria (11)	18,182	34–46
81	July 5	White Sox	6–3	Bannister (6–6)	Richard (3–2)	Soria (12)	15,915	35–46
82	July 6	@ Tigers	4–3	Colón (1–0)	Rodney (0–2)	Soria (13)	32,134	36–46
83	July 7	@ Tigers	8–5	Verlander (9–4)	Chen (0–3)	Rodney (18)	29,751	36–47
84	July 8	@ Tigers	3–1	French (1–0)	Greinke (10–5)	Rodney (19)	29,104	36–48
85	July 9	@ Red Sox	8–4	Hochevar (5–3)	Masterson (3–3)	Soria (14)	38,189	37–48
86	July 10	@ Red Sox	1–0	Lester (8–6)	Bannister (6–7)	Papelbon (23)	38,116	37–49
87	July 11	@ Red Sox	15–9	Smoltz (1–2)	Meche (4–9)		37,825	37–50
88	July 12	@ Red Sox	6–0	Beckett (11–3)	Chen (0–4)		37,612	37–51
89	July 17	Rays	8–7	Nelson (3–0)	Cruz (3–3)	Howell (7)	33,568	37–52
90	July 18	Rays	4–2	Bradford (1–0)	Cruz (3–4)		30,288	37–53
91	July 19	Rays	4–3	Balfour (4–1)	Wright (0–3)	Howell (9)	18,934	37–54
	July 20	Angels	Postponed (rain); Rescheduled for July 21					
92	July 21	Angels	8–5	Santana (3–5)	Ponson (1–6)	Fuentes (29)	N/A	37–55
93	July 21	Angels	10–2	O'Sullivan (3–0)	Chen (0–5)		23,874	37–56
94	July 22	Angels	9–6	Speier (4–2)	Colón (1–1)	Fuentes (30)	18,078	37–57
95	July 24	Rangers	2–0	Feldman (9–3)	Greinke (10–6)	Wilson (10)	25,012	37–58
96	July 25	Rangers	6–3	Hochevar (6–3)	Holland (3–6)	Soria (15)	27,602	38–58
97	July 26	Rangers	7–2	Nippert (3–0)	Mahay (1–1)		16,847	38–59
98	July 27	@ Orioles	5–3	Tejeda (1–0)	Albers (1–4)	Soria (16)	15,169	39–59
99	July 28	@ Orioles	4–3 (11)	Wright (1–3)	Báez (4–4)	Soria (17)	21,545	40–59
100	July 29	@ Orioles	7–3	Albers (2–4)	Tejeda (1–1)	Johnson (2)	19,741	40–60
101	July 30	@ Orioles	7–3	Bergesen (7–5)	Hochevar (6–4)		19,194	40–61
103	July 31	@ Rays	8–2	Price (4–4)	Ponson (1–7)		26,596	40–62

August (10–19)

#	Date	Opponent	Score	Win	Loss	Save	Attendance	Record
103	August 1	@ Rays	7–1	Niemann (10–5)	Chen (0–6)		36,973	40–63
104	August 2	@ Rays	4–1	Bannister (7–7)	Shields (6–8)	Soria (18)	27,930	41–63
105	August 3	@ Rays	10–4	Kazmir (6–6)	Greinke (10–7)		24,219	41–64
106	August 4	Mariners	7–6	Kelley (3–1)	Wright (1–4)	Aardsma (26)	15,057	41–65
107	August 5	Mariners	11–6	French (2–2)	Davies (3–8)		27,805	41–66
108	August 6	Mariners	8–2	Chen (1–6)	Vargas (3–6)		15,103	42–66
109	August 7	Athletics	9–4	Mazzaro (3–8)	Bannister(7–8)		21,918	42–67
110	August 8	Athletics	12–6	Greinke (11–7)	Mortensen(0–1)		29,818	43–67
111	August 9	Athletics	6–3	Anderson (7–8)	Hochevar (6–5)	Bailey (16)	19,439	43–68
112	August 11	@ Twins	14–6	Davies (4–8)	Blackburn (8–7)		32,121	44–68
113	August 12	@ Twins	7–1	Liriano (5–11)	Bannister (7–9)		30,105	44–69
114	August 13	@ Twins	5–4	Meche (5–9)	Pavano (10–9)	Soria (19)	32,373	45–69
115	August 14	@ Tigers	1–0	Lyon (5–4)	Colón (1–2)		34,799	45–70
116	August 15	@ Tigers	0–3	Jackson (6–6)	Hochevar (9–5)		37,276	45–71
117	August 16	@ Tigers	3–2 (10)	Soria (3–0)	Rodney (2–3)		32,888	46–71
118	August 17	@ White Sox	8–7	Linebrink (3–5)	Colón (1–3)	Jenks (25)	36,703	46–72
119	August 18	@ White Sox	4–5	Meche (6–9)	García (0–1)	Soria (20)	28,812	47–72
120	August 19	@ White Sox	4–2	Contreras (5–11)	Greinke (11–8)	Jenks (26)	25,786	47–73
121	August 21	Twins	5–4	Nathan (2–1)	Soria (3–1)		22,283	47–74
122	August 22	Twins	8–7	Duensing (1–1)	Davies (4–9)	Guerrier (1)	33,811	47–75
123	August 23	Twins	10–3	Pavano (11–9)	Bannister (7–10)		18,680	47–76
124	August 24	Indians	10–6	Sowers (5–9)	Soria (3–2)		11,101	47–77
125	August 25	Indians	6–2	Greinke (12–8)	Masterson (4–5)		17,353	47–78
126	August 26	Indians	4–2	Huff (8–7)	Hochevar (6–7)	Wood (16)	10,751	48–78
127	August 27	@ Mariners	8–4	Davies (5–9)	Fister (1–1)		19,345	49–78
128	August 28	@ Mariners	6–3	Hernández (13–5)	Bannister (7–11)	Aardsma (31)	26,714	49–79
129	August 29	@ Mariners	8–4	Snell (5–9)	Meche (6–10)		26,457	49–80
130	August 30	@ Mariners	3–0	Greinke (13–8)	Rowland-Smith (2–2)		30,286	50–80
131	August 31	@ Athletics	8–5	Breslow (6–7)	Hochevar (6–8)	Bailey (21)	10,376	50–81

September (14–11)

#	Date	Opponent	Score	Win	Loss	Save	Attendance	Record
132	September 1	@ Athletics	4–3	Davies (6–9)	Marshall (0–2)	Soria (21)	10,039	51–81
133	September 2	@ Athletics	10–4	Cahill (8–12)	Bannister (7–12)		13,920	51–82
134	September 4	Angels	2–1	Weaver (14–5)	Wright (1–5)	Fuentes (38)	17,447	51–83
135	September 5	Angels	2–1 (11)	Jepsen (5–3)	Yabuta (0–1)	Fuentes (39)	22,628	51–84
136	September 6	Angels	7–2	Saunders (12–7)	Hochevar (6–9)		16,745	51–85
137	September 7	Angels	6–3	Davies (7–9)	Santana (7–8)	Soria (22)	18,453	52–85
137	September 8	Tigers	7–5	Yabuta (1–1)	Seay (5–3)	Soria (23)	12,032	53–85
138	September 9	Tigers	5–1	Tejeda (2–1)	Verlander (16–8)	Soria (24)	10,584	54–85
139	September 10	Tigers	7–4	Colón (2–3)	Miner (6–5)	Rosa (1)	12,029	55–85
141	September 11	@ Indians	2–1	Wright (2–5)	Veras (4–3)	Soria (25)	26,006	56–85
142	September 12	@ Indians	13–6	Huff (10–7)	Hochevar (6–10)		24,842	56–86
143	September 13	@ Indians	7–0	Davies (8–9)	Carrasco (0–2)		21,153	57–86
144	September 15	@ Tigers	11–1	Tejeda (3–1)	Washburn (9–9)		20,422	58–86
145	September 16	@ Tigers	4–3	Miner (7–5)	DiNardo (0–1)	Rodney (33)	25,400	58–87
146	September 17	@ Tigers	9–2	Greinke (14–8)	Jackson (12–7)		26,457	59–87
147	September 18	@ White Sox	11–0	Hochevar (7–10)	Buehrle (12–9)		29,179	62–87
148	September 19	@ White Sox	13–3	Peavy (1–0)	Hughes (0–1)		28,329	60–88
149	September 20	@ White Sox	2–1	Tejeda (4–1)	García (2–3)	Soria (26)	22,798	61–88
150	September 21	Red Sox	12–9	Yabuta (2–1)	Bard (2–2)	Soria (27)	16,770	62–88
151	September 22	Red Sox	5–1	Greinke (15–8)	Byrd (1–2)	Soria (28)	21,228	63–88
152	September 23	Red Sox	9–2	Beckett (16–6)	Hochevar (7–11)		18,989	63–89
153	September 24	Red Sox	10–3	Buchholz (7–3)	Lerew (0–1)		20,807	63–90
154	September 25	Twins	9–4	Pavano (13–11)	Tejeda (4–2)		23,307	63–91
155	September 26	Twins	11–6	Baker (14–9)	DiNardo (0–2)		30,690	63–92
156	September 27	Twins	4–1	Greinke (16–8)	Liriano (5–13)	Soria (29)	28,721	64–92
157	September 28	@ Yankees	8–2	Gaudin (2–0)	Hochevar (7–12)		45,348	64–93
158	September 29	@ Yankees	4–3	Bruney (5–0)	Farnsworth (1–5)		44,794	64–94
159	September 30	@ Yankees	4–3	Wright (3–5)	Marte (1–3)	Soria (30)	46,956	65–94

October (0–3)

#	Date	Opponent	Score	Win	Loss	Save	Attendance	Record
160	October 2	@ Twins	10–7	Manship (1–1)	DiNardo (0–3)	Nathan (46)	40,223	65–95
161	October 3	@ Twins	5–4	Rauch (5–1)	Hughes (0–2)	Nathan (47)	48,644	65–96
162	October 4	@ Twins	13–4	Pavano (14–12)	Hochevar (7–13)		51,155	65–97

Please do not edit this line: OgreBot End-->

== Player stats ==
=== Batting ===
Note: G = Games played; AB = At bats; R = Runs scored; H = Hits; 2B = Doubles; 3B = Triples; HR = Home runs; RBI = Runs batted in; AVG = Batting average; SB = Stolen bases

Player	G	AB	R	H	2B	3B	HR	RBI	AVG	SB
(C) Miguel Olivo	114	390	51	97	15	5	23	65	.249	5
(1B) Billy Butler	159	608	78	183	51	1	21	93	.301	1
(2B) Alberto Callaspo	155	576	79	173	41	8	11	73	.300	2
(SS) Yuniesky Betancourt	71	246	25	59	10	5	4	27	.240	0
(3B) Mark Teahen	144	524	69	142	34	1	12	50	.271	8
(LF) David DeJesus	144	558	74	157	28	9	13	71	.281	4
(CF) Mitch Maier	127	341	42	83	15	3	3	31	.243	9
(RF) José Guillén	81	281	30	68	8	0	9	40	.242	1
(DH) Mike Jacobs	128	434	46	99	16	1	19	61	.228	0
(UT) Willie Bloomquist	125	434	52	115	11	8	4	29	.265	25
(CF) Coco Crisp	49	180	30	41	8	5	3	14	.228	13
(C) John Buck	59	186	16	46	12	4	8	36	.247	1
(3B) Alex Gordon	49	164	28	38	6	0	6	22	.232	5
(C) Brayan Peña	64	165	17	45	10	0	6	18	.273	0
(SS) Mike Avilés	36	120	10	22	3	1	1	8	.183	1
(CF) Josh Anderson	44	118	20	28	3	0	1	8	.237	12
(SS) Luis Hernández	37	73	4	15	1	0	0	4	.205	1
(SS) Tony Peña Jr.	40	51	3	5	1	0	0	2	.098	0
(OF) Ryan Freel	18	45	8	11	2	0	0	3	.244	0
(UT) Tug Hulett	15	18	4	2	0	0	0	1	.111	0
Pitcher totals	162	20	0	3	1	0	0	1	.150	0
Team totals	162	5532	686	1432	276	51	144	657	.259	88

=== Pitching ===
Note: W = Wins; L = Losses; ERA = Earned run average; G = Games pitched; GS = Games started; SV = Saves; IP = Innings pitched; H = Hits allowed; R = Runs allowed; ER = Earned runs; BB = Walks; SO = Strikeouts

Player	W	L	ERA	G	GS	SV	IP	H	R	ER	BB	SO
(SP) Zack Greinke	16	8	2.16	33	33	0	229.1	195	64	65	51	242
(SP) Brian Bannister	7	12	4.73	26	26	0	154.0	161	94	81	50	98
(SP) Luke Hochevar	7	13	6.55	25	25	0	143.0	167	109	104	46	106
(SP) Gil Meche	6	10	5.09	23	23	0	129.0	144	81	73	58	95
(SP) Kyle Davies	8	9	5.27	22	22	0	123.0	122	76	72	66	86
(CL) Joakim Soria	3	2	2.21	47	0	30	53.0	44	14	13	16	69
(RP) Jamey Wright	3	5	4.33	65	0	0	79.0	73	51	38	44	60
(RP) Juan Cruz	3	4	5.72	46	0	2	50.1	46	34	32	29	38
(RP) Román Colón	2	3	4.83	43	0	0	50.1	50	27	27	22	29
(RP) John Bale	0	1	5.72	43	0	1	28.1	34	19	18	18	24
Robinson Tejeda	4	2	3.54	35	6	0	73.2	43	30	29	50	87
Bruce Chen	1	6	5.78	17	9	0	62.1	74	42	40	25	32
Sidney Ponson	1	7	7.36	14	9	0	58.2	79	50	48	25	32
Ron Mahay	1	1	4.79	41	0	0	41.1	55	26	22	19	34
Kyle Farnsworth	1	5	4.58	41	0	0	37.1	43	22	19	14	42
Horacio Ramírez	0	2	5.96	19	1	0	22.2	27	16	15	11	13
Lenny DiNardo	0	3	10.13	5	5	0	21.1	41	28	24	15	8
Dusty Hughes	0	2	5.14	8	1	0	14.0	13	9	8	8	15
Yasuhiko Yabuta	2	1	13.50	12	0	0	14.0	29	21	21	7	9
Anthony Lerew	0	1	4.05	3	2	0	13.1	14	8	6	8	7
Víctor Marte	0	0	8.25	8	0	0	12.0	13	12	11	12	7
Carlos Rosa	0	0	3.38	7	0	1	10.2	10	4	4	3	4
Doug Waechter	0	0	8.44	5	0	0	5.1	9	5	5	3	3
Team totals	65	97	4.83	162	162	34	1426.0	1486	842	765	600	1153

== Awards and honors ==
=== Player of the week ===
April 13–19: Zack Greinke, shared with Ian Kinsler (Texas Rangers).

=== Pitcher of the month ===
April: Zack Greinke.

=== Pepsi clutch performer of the month ===
April: Zack Greinke.

== Farm system ==
Level	Team	League	Manager
AAA	Omaha Royals	Pacific Coast League	Mike Jirschele
AA	Northwest Arkansas Naturals	Texas League	Brian Poldberg
A	Wilmington Blue Rocks	Carolina League	Brian Rupp
A	Burlington Bees	Midwest League	Jim Gabella
Rookie	Burlington Royals	Appalachian League	Nelson Liriano
Rookie	AZL Royals	Arizona League	Julio Bruno
Rookie	Idaho Falls Chukars	Pioneer League	Darryl Kennedy
