= Wyatt Toregas =

American baseball player and coach (born 1982)

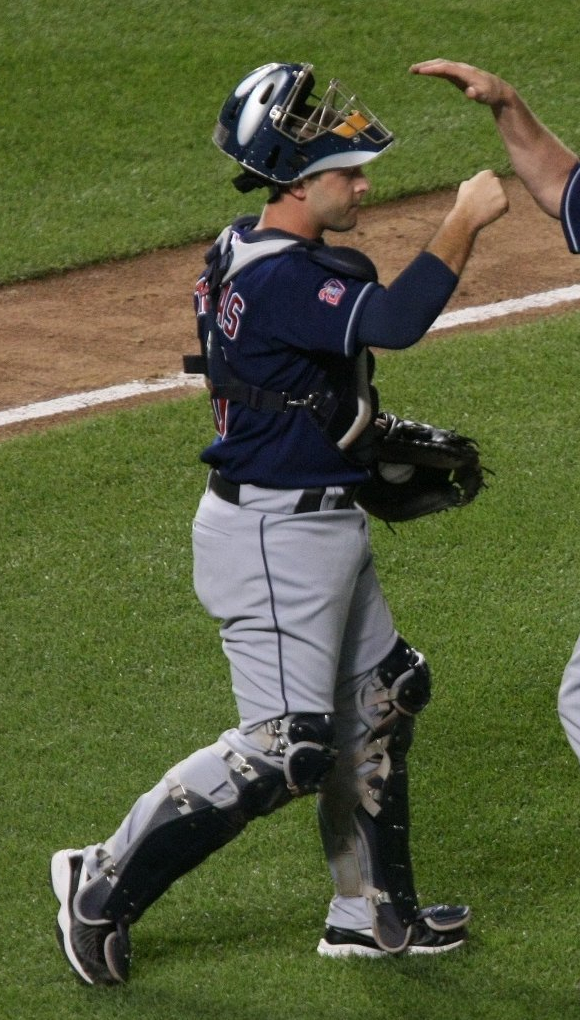
- Toregas during his tenure with the Cleveland Indians in 2009
- Catcher / Manager
- Born: December 2, 1982 (age 43); Fairfax, Virginia, United States
- Batted: Right Threw: Right

MLB debut
- August 1, 2009, for the Cleveland Indians

Last MLB appearance
- June 12, 2011, for the Pittsburgh Pirates

MLB statistics
- Batting average: .164
- Home runs: 0
- Runs batted in: 6
- Stats at Baseball Reference

Teams
- Cleveland Indians (2009); Pittsburgh Pirates (2011)

Wyatt Reeder Toregas (born December 2, 1982) is an American former Major League Baseball (MLB) catcher who played for the Cleveland Indians in 2009 and for the Pittsburgh Pirates in 2011. He is also the former manager of the Mississippi Braves, the Double-A affiliate of the Atlanta Braves, and previously managed the West Virginia Black Bears, West Virginia Power, and Bradenton Marauders.

== Playing career ==
=== Amateur career ===
==== High school ====
He attended South Lakes High School in Reston, Virginia where he excelled in wrestling, golf, and baseball.

==== College ====
After graduation from high school in 2001, Toregas played college baseball at Virginia Tech. In 2003, he played collegiate summer baseball with the Harwich Mariners of the Cape Cod Baseball League.

=== Pro career ===
==== Cleveland Indians ====
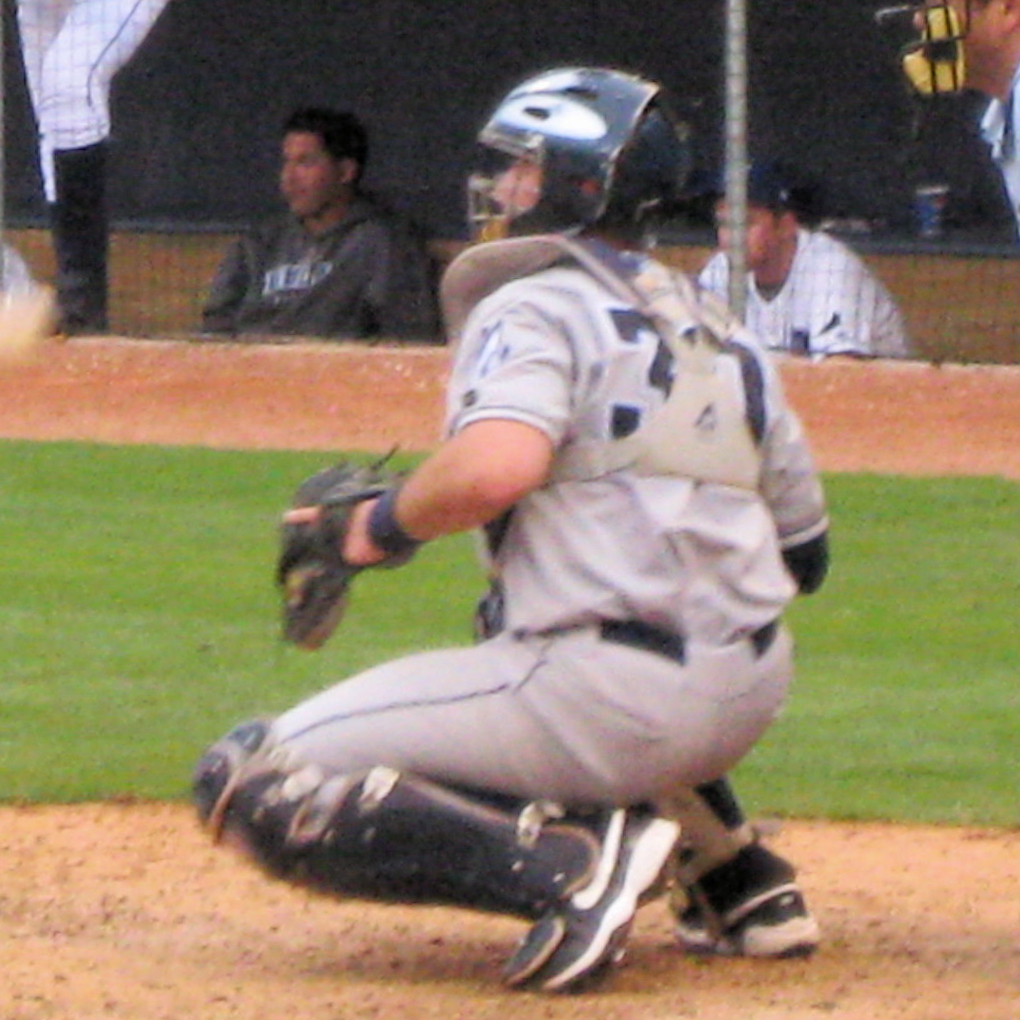
Toregas playing for the Columbus Clippers, triple-A affiliates of the Cleveland Indians, in 2009

After being drafted by the Indians in 2004, Toregas played for the minor league teams Mahoning Valley Scrappers, Lake County Captains, Kinston Indians, Akron Aeros, and Columbus Clippers. A catcher and a 2007 non-roster invitee to spring training with the Indians, Toregas throws and bats right-handed. He also attended Indians spring training in 2009 but returned to the Columbus Clippers on March 24, 2009. Toregas made his Major League debut and got his first hit in his first Major League at bat on August 1, 2009. Toregas was released by the Indians after the 2010 season.

==== Pittsburgh Pirates ====
Toregas signed a minor league contract with the Pittsburgh Pirates on January 18, 2011. The Pirates purchased his contract on June 9, adding him to the active roster. He was designated for assignment on June 13. After the 2011 season, he elected for free agency.

== Coaching career ==
In November 2011, Toregas signed with the Pittsburgh Pirates as a player-coach; he served as the first base coach for the 2012 Indianapolis Indians. In January 2015, Toregas was named as the first manager in the franchise history of the Pirates' Short-Season-A affiliate, the West Virginia Black Bears. In March 2021, he was named as the manager of the Mississippi Braves, the Double-A affiliate of the Atlanta Braves. On June 11, 2021, Toregas resigned as manager of the Mississippi Braves. No reason or replacement has been announced.

== Personal life ==
Toregas was raised in Ashburn, Virginia.

Toregas is a member of the Chickasaw Nation. He has Chickasaw heritage through his grandmother Jalna Wenonah Wolf Toregas, and his memories of her stories about the tribe led him to pursue official membership near the end of his playing career.
