= Niuman Romero =

Venezuelan baseball player (born 1985)

- Infielder
- Born: January 24, 1985 (age 41); Barcelona, Venezuela
- Batted: Switch Threw: Right

MLB debut
- September 8, 2009, for the Cleveland Indians

Last MLB appearance
- July 6, 2010, for the Boston Red Sox

MLB statistics (through 2010 season)
- Batting average: .111
- Home runs: 0
- Runs batted in: 0
- Stats at Baseball Reference

Teams
- Cleveland Indians (2009); Boston Red Sox (2010)

Niuman José Romero (born January 24, 1985) is a Venezuelan former professional baseball infielder. He played in Major League Baseball (MLB) for the Cleveland Indians and Boston Red Sox.

== Career ==
=== Cleveland Indians ===
Romero was originally signed by the Cleveland Indians as an amateur free agent on November 20, 2002. In 2005, he officially joined the Indians organization and played for the rookie-level Burlington Indians. The following season he played for the Single-A Lake County Captains, hitting .228/.319/.274 in 114 games. Romero split the 2007 season between Lake County and the High-A Kinston Indians, hitting a combined .231/.359/.306 in 81 games between the two teams. Romero returned to Kinston in 2008 and slashed .296/.351/.403 with 6 home runs and 53 RBI in 108 games. Romero was assigned to the Double-A Akron Aeros to begin the 2009 season, and was later promoted to the Triple-A Columbus Clippers.

On September 8, 2009, Romero was selected to the 40-man roster and promoted to the major leagues for the first time. He made his MLB debut that day, going 0-for-1 against the Texas Rangers. In his debut campaign, Romero appeared in 10 major league games, going 2-for-14 with a walk. On October 30, 2009, Romero was outrighted off of the 40-man roster and assigned to Triple-A Columbus. Romero was invited to Spring Training in 2010 but did not make the team and was assigned to Columbus to begin the year.

=== Boston Red Sox ===
On May 1, 2010, Romero was acquired by the Boston Red Sox in exchange for cash considerations. He was assigned to the Triple-A Pawtucket Red Sox upon being acquired. On July 2, 2010, he was called up to replace Ángel Sánchez, who was traded to the Houston Astros for Kevin Cash. He only appeared in two games for the Red Sox in 2010 before he was designated for assignment and returned to the minors. Romero finished the year hitting .246/.314/.311 in 99 games for Pawtucket and elected free agency on October 15.

=== Toronto Blue Jays ===
On March 1, 2011 Romero signed a minor league contract with the Toronto Blue Jays. Romero was assigned to the Triple-A Las Vegas 51s to begin the season, and 4-for-25 in 8 games for the team.

=== Philadelphia Phillies ===
Romero was traded to the Philadelphia Phillies on May 25, 2011, in exchange for cash considerations. Romero played in 34 games for the Double-A Reading Phillies, also receiving a hitless at-bat for the Triple-A Lehigh Valley IronPigs, and hit .239/.312/.266 with no home runs and 11 RBI before he was released on July 13.

=== New York Mets ===
On July 16, 2011, Romero signed a minor league contract with the New York Mets and was assigned to the Double-A Binghamton Mets. Romero slashed .243/.295/.282 with no home runs and 12 RBI in 32 games for Binghamton. He elected free agency on November 2.

=== Detroit Tigers ===
On January 10, 2012, Romero signed a minor league contract with the Detroit Tigers organization. He spent the year with the Double-A Erie SeaWolves and batted .300/.367/.421 with 9 home runs and 67 RBI in 35 games with the team. He elected free agency following the season on November 2.

=== Baltimore Orioles ===
On December 14, 2012, Romero signed a minor league contract with the Baltimore Orioles organization that included an invitation to Spring Training. He did not make the team and split the 2013 season between the Double-A Bowie Baysox and Triple-A Norfolk Tides, hitting a cumulative .267/.367/.356 in 117 games. He elected free agency on November 4, 2013.

On January 27, 2014, Romero signed a minor league contract with the Colorado Rockies, but was released prior to the season on March 27. He re-signed with the Orioles on a new minor league contract on April 2, 2014. Romero spent the year with Double-A Bowie and slashed .320/.417/.417 with 5 home runs and 48 RBI in 130 games. He became a free agent following the season.

=== Oakland Athletics ===
On November 26, 2014, Romero signed a minor league contract with the Oakland Athletics organization that included an invitation to Spring Training. He was assigned to the Triple-A Nashville Sounds to begin the year, but was released on August 5, 2015 after hitting .278/.363/.325 in 72 games.

=== New York Mets (second stint) ===
On January 21, 2016, Romero signed a minor league deal to return to the New York Mets organization. Romero split the 2016 season between the Triple-A Las Vegas 51s and Double-A Binghamton Mets, recording a .248/.331/.317 slash with one home run and 21 RBI in 90 total games. Romero elected free agency following the season on November 7.

=== Algodoneros de Unión Laguna ===
On April 3, 2019, Romero signed with the Algodoneros de Unión Laguna of the Mexican League. In 86 games for the team, Romero batted .323/.381/.452 with 5 home runs and 50 RBI. Romero was released by the Algodoneros following the season on January 30, 2020. After the 2020 season, he played for Caribes de Anzoátegui of the Liga Venezolana de Béisbol Profesional(LVMP). He has also played for Venezuela in the 2021 Caribbean Series.

=== El Águila de Veracruz ===
On February 4, 2022, Romero signed with El Águila de Veracruz of the Mexican League. In 87 appearances for the team, he batted .330/.441/.491 with seven home runs and 51 RBI. Romero was released by Veracruz on January 19, 2023.

== See also ==
- List of Major League Baseball players from Venezuela
