= Jeremy Sowers =

American baseball player and executive (born 1983)

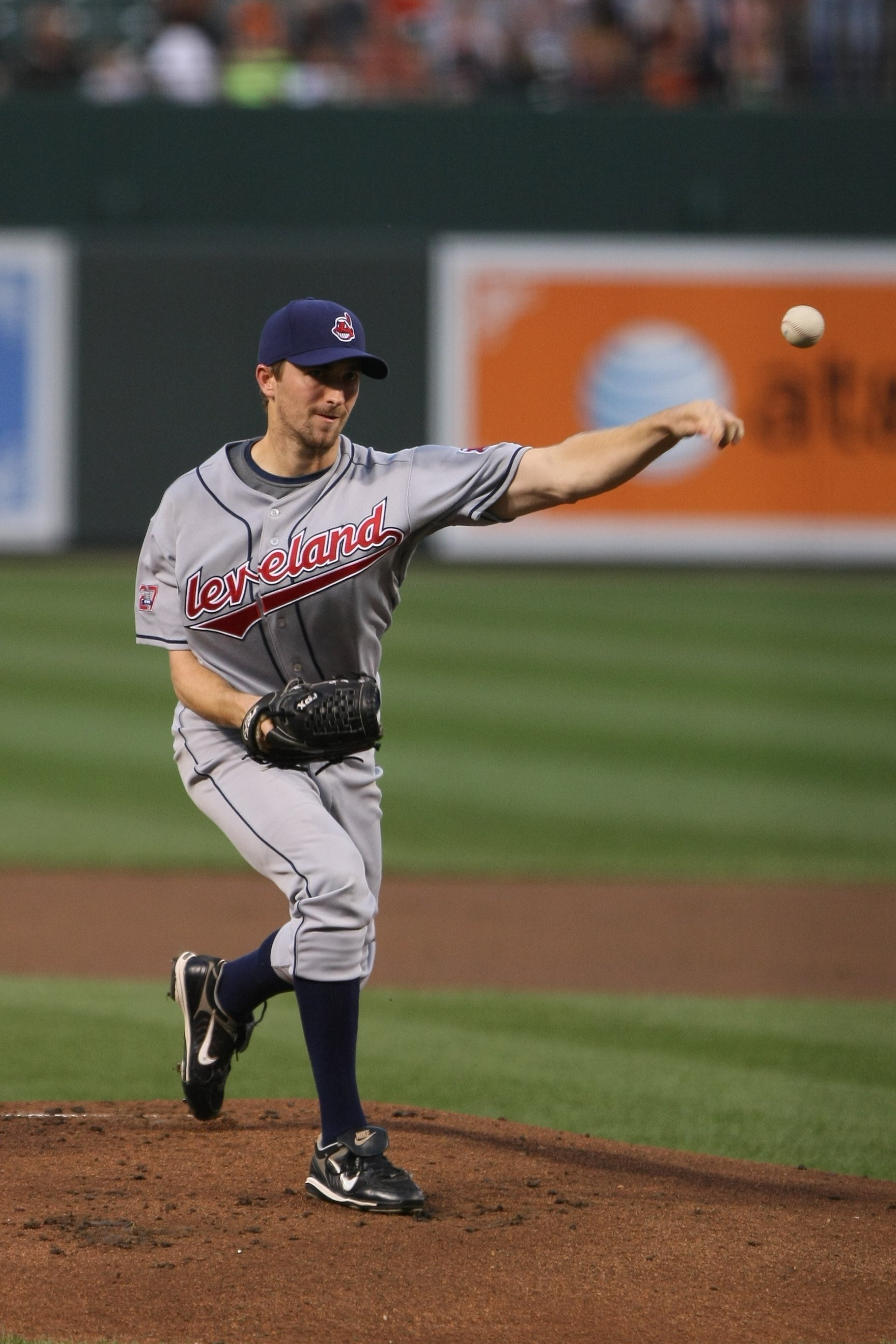
- Sowers with the Cleveland Indians in 2009

Tampa Bay Rays
- Pitcher / Manager of operations
- Born: May 17, 1983 (age 42); St. Clairsville, Ohio, U.S.
- Batted: Left Threw: Left

MLB debut
- June 25, 2006, for the Cleveland Indians

Last MLB appearance
- October 2, 2009, for the Cleveland Indians

MLB statistics
- Win–loss record: 18–30
- Earned run average: 5.18
- Strikeouts: 174
- Stats at Baseball Reference

Teams
- As player: Cleveland Indians (2006–2009); As executive: Tampa Bay Rays (2020–present)

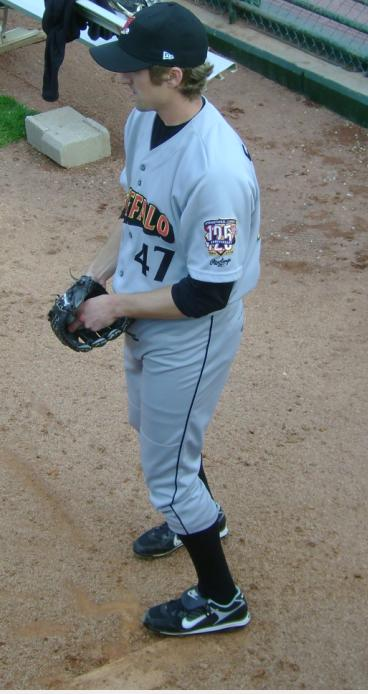
Sowers during his tenure with the Buffalo Bisons, Triple-A affiliates of the Cleveland Indians, in 2008.

Jeremy Bryan Sowers (born May 17, 1983) is an American former professional baseball pitcher and current executive. He played in Major League Baseball (MLB) for the Cleveland Indians from 2006 to 2009, and is currently the manager of major league operations for the Tampa Bay Rays.

Sowers grew up in Louisville, Kentucky, where he attended Ballard High School. His twin brother, Joshua Sowers, formerly played in the Toronto Blue Jays organization. Sowers' pitching repertoire featured a fastball with which he varied the speed between about 85 and 92 mph, a curveball, a slider that cuts in on right-handed batters, and a changeup.

== High school and college ==
Sowers threw four no-hitters in high school. In both his junior and his senior year at Ballard, he led the team to consecutive appearances in the state high school championship game and was named All-State, All-Section, All-Region and County Player of the Year. As a senior, he was named to Baseball America's National High School All-American team, Kentucky Gatorade Player of the Year, Mr. Kentucky Baseball and Kentucky High School Coaches Association Athlete of the Year. He was selected out of high school with the 20th overall pick in the 2001 Major League Baseball draft by the Cincinnati Reds.

Rather than sign with the Reds, Sowers chose to attend Vanderbilt University where he was named to the Louisville Slugger Freshman All-American team following the 2002 season and to their 2004 pre-season All-American team. He was second team All-SEC as both a sophomore and a junior and was also selected second team All-South Region by the American Baseball Coaches Association as a sophomore.

In 2002 and 2003, Sowers played collegiate summer baseball for the Wareham Gatemen of the Cape Cod Baseball League (CCBL). A league all-star in 2003, he posted a 1.20 ERA with 64 strikeouts in 67 1/3 innings. Sowers was inducted into the CCBL Hall of Fame in 2017.

After his junior year at Vanderbilt, the Indians selected Sowers with the sixth overall pick in the 2004 Major League Baseball draft. He signed with them for a $2.475 million signing bonus, the third highest bonus in club history. During the 2005–06 offseason, he was granted permission by the club to return to Vanderbilt to complete his political science degree.

== Minor leagues ==
Sowers split most of the 2005 season between the Indians' Single-A (Kinston) and Double-A (Akron) farm teams, compiling a combined 13–4 record and 2.40 ERA in 26 starts. He finished 2005 with a single start for the Triple-A Buffalo Bisons in which he was credited with a win. He was named the Indians Minor League Pitcher of the Year (Bob Feller Award) for the 2005 season. Baseball America named him the #2 prospect in the Indians organization, the #6 prospect in the Carolina League and the #8 prospect in the Eastern League. He was named the Indians' 2005 Minor League Player of the Year (receiving the "Lou Boudreau Award").

In 2006, Sowers was a non-roster invitee at the Indians' spring training, but did not make the club's Opening Day roster, beginning the season with Buffalo. In 15 starts for the Bisons, he picked up where he left off in 2005, posting a sterling 9–1 record and 1.39 ERA. Baseball America named him the #3 prospect in the International League.

== Major leagues ==
=== Cleveland Indians ===
Sowers' performance for Buffalo in 2006 earned him a promotion to Cleveland on June 20. He made his major league debut against the Reds on June 25, taking the loss after allowing four earned runs on five hits while recording three strikeouts and two walks in five innings pitched. He tossed his first major league complete game shutout on July 22, 2006, against the Minnesota Twins, allowing four hits and one walk while striking out four. Six days later, he threw another shutout—this one a 1–0 game against the Seattle Mariners—becoming the first Indians rookie to throw back-to-back shutouts since Dick Tidrow in 1972. In his next start on August 2 against the Boston Red Sox, he extended his scoreless inning streak to 22 before yielding an RBI double in the fifth inning. In 15 starts with Cleveland, Sowers finished 7–4 with a 3.57 ERA.

Sowers was projected to be the Indians' fourth starter in 2007. When Cliff Lee was injured during spring training, Sowers was bumped up to the third spot in the starting rotation. However, he struggled through the first two months of the season (1–6, 6.93 ERA in 12 starts) and was demoted to Buffalo on June 10. On September 26, Sowers returned to start the second game of a doubleheader against the Mariners. He tossed five scoreless innings and was in line for the win after leaving the game, but earned a no-decision in Seattle's 3–2 win.

In 2008, Sowers competed for Cleveland's fifth starter job in spring training along with Cliff Lee and Aaron Laffey. Lee won the job, sending Sowers back to Triple-A Buffalo. On April 26, Sowers was recalled from Buffalo to start against the New York Yankees. He allowed three earned runs in 5 1/3 innings while striking out three in a no-decision. Sowers was optioned back to Buffalo following the game. He was recalled to make another spot start on May 16. After earning a second no-decision, he was again sent to Buffalo to make room on the roster for Michael Aubrey. On June 8, Sowers was recalled for a third time, and spent the remainder of the season in Cleveland's starting rotation. In 22 starts, he was 4–9 with a 5.58 ERA.

During spring training in 2009, Sowers again competed for the fifth starting pitcher slot; he was not selected and was sent down to the Triple-A Columbus Clippers. On May 7, he was recalled to the active roster. Sowers appeared in 23 games (22 starts) with the Indians, going 6–11 with an ERA of 5.25.

On March 31, 2010, after failing to secure a spot in the major league starting rotation, Sowers was sent outright to Triple-A Columbus and removed from the Indians' 40-man roster. Suffering with a sore shoulder for most of the season, Sowers was finally placed on the disabled list on August 14, 2010, and did not play for the remainder of the 2010 season. He became a free agent on November 2, 2011.

=== Southern Maryland Blue Crabs ===
After sitting out the 2012 season, Sowers signed with the Southern Maryland Blue Crabs of the Atlantic League of Professional Baseball on April 17, 2013. He announced his retirement on June 1. In eight starts, Sowers went 1–3 with a 4.30 ERA and 25 strikeouts in 44 innings pitched.

== Post-playing career ==
After playing independent baseball, Sowers earned his MBA from the University of North Carolina. He worked corporate strategy for Walmart before returning to baseball with the Baltimore Orioles.

In 2016, Sowers was hired by the Tampa Bay Rays to work as an assistant in their baseball operations department. In February 2020, when James Click left the Rays to become the general manager of the Houston Astros, Sowers was promoted to manager of major league operations.

Sowers and his wife, Ashley, have three daughters.
