= David Huff (baseball) =

American baseball player (born 1984)

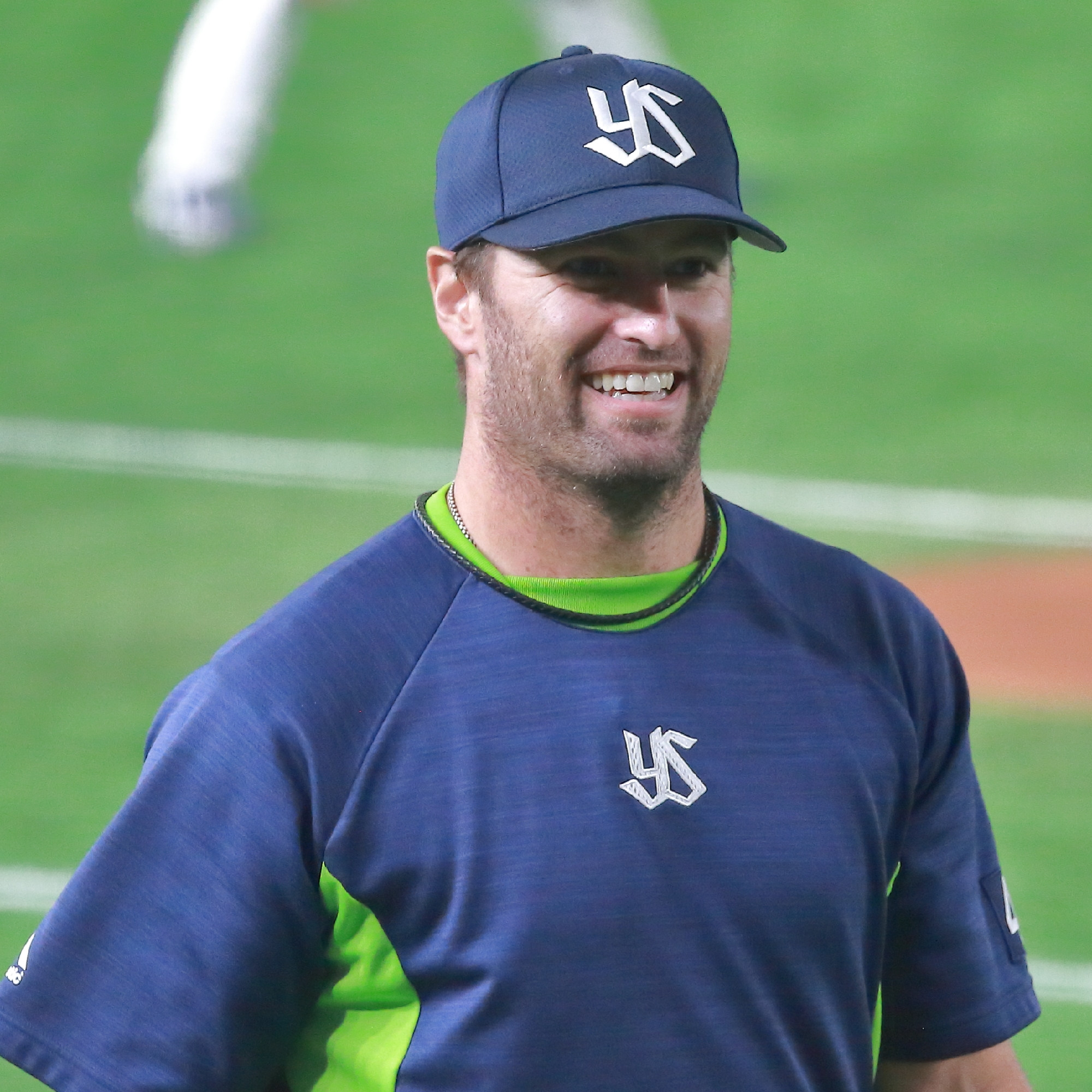
- Huff with the Swallows in 2019
- Pitcher
- Born: August 22, 1984 (age 42); Huntington Beach, California, U.S.
- Batted: Switch Threw: Left

Professional debut
- MLB: May 17, 2009, for the Cleveland Indians
- KBO: July 14, 2016, for the LG Twins
- NPB: April 4, 2018, for the Tokyo Yakult Swallows

Last appearance
- MLB: June 12, 2016, for the Los Angeles Angels
- KBO: September 30, 2017, for the LG Twins
- NPB: June 30, 2019, for the Tokyo Yakult Swallows

MLB statistics
- Win–loss record: 25–30
- Earned run average: 5.17
- Strikeouts: 234

KBO statistics
- Win–loss record: 13–6
- Earned run average: 2.66
- Strikeouts: 144

NPB statistics
- Win–loss record: 4–11
- Earned run average: 4.50
- Strikeouts: 136
- Stats at Baseball Reference

Teams
- Cleveland Indians (2009–2013); New York Yankees (2013); San Francisco Giants (2014); New York Yankees (2014); Los Angeles Dodgers (2015); Los Angeles Angels (2016); LG Twins (2016–2017); Tokyo Yakult Swallows (2018–2019)
Medals
Men's baseball
Representing United States
Pan American Games
Silver medal – second place	2015 Toronto	Team

David Gregory Huff (born August 22, 1984) is an American former professional baseball pitcher. He played in Major League Baseball (MLB) for the Cleveland Indians, San Francisco Giants, New York Yankees, Los Angeles Dodgers, and Los Angeles Angels. Huff also played in the KBO League for the LG Twins, and in Nippon Professional Baseball (NPB) for the Tokyo Yakult Swallows.

== Early life ==
Huff attended Edison High School, the University of California, Irvine, Cypress College, and the University of California, Los Angeles.

In 2004 and 2005, he played collegiate summer baseball with the Chatham A's of the Cape Cod Baseball League.

== Professional career ==
=== Cleveland Indians ===
==== Minor leagues ====
Huff was selected by the Cleveland Indians in the first round, with the 39th overall selection, of the 2006 MLB draft.

Since 2006, Huff has played minor league baseball with the Mahoning Valley Scrappers, Kinston Indians, Akron Aeros, Buffalo Bisons, and Columbus Clippers.

In 11 games with the Akron Aeros in 2008, Huff had a career-best ERA of 1.92. He then pitched 80 innings for the Bisons in 2008 and put up a 3.01 ERA. He was named the Indians' 2008 Minor League Player of the Year (receiving the "Lou Boudreau Award").

Huff pitched for the Triple–A Columbus Clippers in 2009 until his call-up on May 16. He had a 5–1 record with a 4.35 ERA with the Clippers.

==== Major leagues ====
Huff made his MLB debut with a start against the Tampa Bay Rays on May 17, 2009. He allowed seven runs in only 3 2/3 innings to pick up the loss. He recorded his first MLB win on June 7 when he allowed three runs in five innings against the Chicago White Sox. In 23 starts in 2009 he finished 11-8 with a 5.61 ERA.

On May 29, 2010, Huff was hit in the head by a comeback line drive off the bat of Alex Rodriguez. Huff was carried off the field by a medical cart several minutes later. Huff did not sustain a concussion, and returned to his regular baseball activities within 48 hours of the incident.

Huff split his time with the Indians and the minor league affiliates during his four-year tenure with the team. Huff was designated for assignment by the Indians organization on May 24, 2013. Overall, Huff went 18–26 with a 5.40 ERA during his career with the Cleveland Indians.

=== New York Yankees ===
Huff was claimed off waivers by the Yankees on May 26, 2013 and made his Yankees debut the same day he was acquired, recording a strikeout, two walks, and allowing a run in one inning of relief pitched against the Tampa Bay Rays. He was designated for assignment on May 28, after Joba Chamberlain was activated from the disabled list. Not wanting to join a third organization, and trusting Yankees' pitching coach Larry Rothschild, Huff accepted a minor league assignment to the Scranton/Wilkes-Barre RailRiders of the Triple–A International League, after receiving instruction from Rothschild on how to improve his delivery. In Scranton, he continued his work with Gil Patterson.

Huff was re-added to the Yankees' 25-man major league roster and recalled from the minors on August 15, 2013. On August 22, Huff got his first win as a Yankee after pitching five innings of one-hit relief against the Toronto Blue Jays. The Yankees primarily used Huff in the long relief role, but gave him a start in place of Phil Hughes on September 7. He was 3-1 with a 4.67 ERA in 11 appearances (2 starts).

=== San Francisco Giants ===
On January 24, 2014, the Yankees traded Huff to the San Francisco Giants for cash considerations. He was designated for assignment on June 6 after posting a disappointing 6.30 ERA with 11 strikeouts and six walks in 20 innings.

=== New York Yankees (second stint) ===
On June 11, 2014, Huff was traded back to the Yankees for cash considerations. He was 3-1 with a 1.85 ERA in 30 games and became a free agent on December 2, 2014, after he was non-tendered by the Yankees.

=== Los Angeles Dodgers ===
The Los Angeles Dodgers signed him to a minor league contract in January 2015 and invited him to spring training. He was assigned to the Triple–A Oklahoma City Dodgers. After one three inning appearance in the minors, the Dodgers purchased his contract and called him up to the Majors to start the April 14 game against the Mariners. He allowed four runs in four innings and was designated for assignment after the game. After returning to Oklahoma City, he was again recalled by the Dodgers on June 1. He was designated for assignment again on June 2 after appearing in relief in two games. He returned to the minors and appeared in 23 games for Oklahoma City, only four of which were starts. He was 5–2 with a 2.20 ERA.

Huff was selected to be a member of the United States national baseball team for the 2015 Pan-American Games.

=== Kansas City Royals ===
On January 9, 2016, Huff agreed to a minor league deal with the Kansas City Royals. He would earn $1.1 million if he made the Major League roster. He opted out of his contract on May 15, making him a free agent.

=== Los Angeles Angels ===
On May 17, 2016, Huff signed a minor league contract with the Los Angeles Angels. On June 7, the Angels selected Huff's contract, adding him to their active roster. In two appearances for Los Angeles, he struggled to an 0-2 record and 11.81 ERA with three strikeouts across 5 1/3 innings pitched. Huff was designated for assignment by the Angels on June 13. He cleared waivers and was sent outright to the Triple-A Salt Lake Bees on June 16. Huff was released by the Angels organization on July 13.

=== LG Twins ===
On July 8, 2016, Huff signed a contract with the LG Twins of the KBO League for the remainder of the season. In 13 appearances (11 starts) for the Twins, he compiled a 7-2 record and 3.13 ERA with 46 strikeouts across 74 2/3 innings pitched.

Huff made 19 appearances (17 starts) for LG during the 2017 season, registering a 6-4 record and 2.38 ERA with 98 strikeouts across 124 2/3 innings pitched.

=== Tokyo Yakult Swallows ===
On December 20, 2017, Huff signed a one-year, $1.3 million contract with the Tokyo Yakult Swallows of Nippon Professional Baseball. He made 35 appearances for Tokyo in 2018, posting a 3-6 record and 4.87 ERA with 78 strikeouts across 94 1/3 innings pitched.

Huff pitched in 68 contests for the Swallows in 2019, logging a 1-5 record and 3.97 ERA with 58 strikeouts and three saves across 65 2/3 innings of work. On December 2, 2019, Huff became a free agent.

=== Sugar Land Lightning Sloths ===
On January 20, 2020, Huff signed a minor league contract with the Arizona Diamondbacks. He did not play in a game in 2020 due to the cancellation of the minor league season because of the COVID-19 pandemic. Huff was released by the Diamondbacks organization on May 28.

In July 2020, Huff signed on to play for the Sugar Land Lightning Sloths of the Constellation Energy League (a makeshift 4-team independent league created as a result of the COVID-19 pandemic) for the 2020 season.

=== Seattle Mariners ===
On May 13, 2021, Huff signed a minor league contract with the Seattle Mariners organization. Huff pitched to a 5.25 ERA in 14 appearances, 9 starts for the Triple-A Tacoma Rainiers before he was released on August 12.

=== Diablos Rojos del México ===
On April 8, 2022, Huff signed with the Diablos Rojos del México of the Mexican League. Huff made 21 appearances (11 starts) for México on the year, recording a 6-1 record and 4.86 ERA with 53 strikeouts over 74 innings pitched.

=== Saraperos de Saltillo ===
On December 29, 2022, Huff was loaned to the Guerreros de Oaxaca. Huff was released by Oaxaca on January 18, 2023, after the team signed Eric Filia. On May 14, Huff signed with the Saraperos de Saltillo. He made 13 starts for the club in 2023, compiling a 5–4 record and 4.50 ERA with 50 strikeouts across 74 innings.

Huff made 16 appearances for Saltillo in 2024, but struggled to an 11.51 ERA with 15 strikeouts across 20 1/3 innings pitched. He was released by the Saraperos on June 30, 2024.

=== Leones de Yucatán ===
On July 3, 2024, Huff signed with the Leones de Yucatán of the Mexican League. In 6 appearances for Yucatán, he logged a 5.63 ERA with 5 strikeouts over 8 innings of work. Huff was released by the Leones on November 12.
