= Zach Miner =

American baseball player (born 1982)

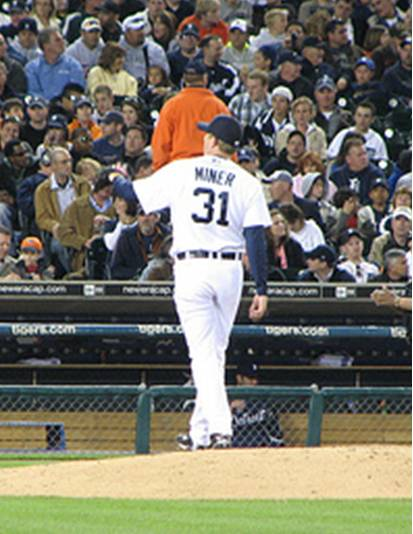
- Miner with the Detroit Tigers
- Pitcher
- Born: March 12, 1982 (age 44); St. Louis, Missouri, U.S.
- Batted: Right Threw: Right

MLB debut
- June 4, 2006, for the Detroit Tigers

Last MLB appearance
- September 29, 2013, for the Philadelphia Phillies

MLB statistics
- Win–loss record: 25–22
- Earned run average: 4.25
- Strikeouts: 237
- Stats at Baseball Reference

Teams
- Detroit Tigers (2006–2009); Philadelphia Phillies (2013); Lamigo Monkeys (2014)

Career highlights and awards
- Taiwan Series champion (2014)

Zachary Charles Miner (born March 12, 1982) is an American former professional baseball pitcher. He played in Major League Baseball (MLB) for the Detroit Tigers and Philadelphia Phillies and in the Chinese Professional Baseball League (CPBL) for the Lamigo Monkeys.

== Career ==
=== Atlanta Braves ===
Standing at 6 foot 3 inches and 205 pounds, Miner had no previous college experience before playing minor and major league baseball. He did, however, play high school baseball for Palm Beach Gardens Community High School. Miner was a fourth round pick by the Atlanta Braves, and in 2000, he received the second-team All-American pitcher award, and had been offered a full ride to Miami University.

Miner spent 2001–2004 in the Braves minor league system, pitching for the Single-A Jamestown Jammers (2001), Class-A Macon Braves (2002), Single-A Myrtle Beach Pelicans (2003), and Double-A Greenville Braves (2004). 2005 found him with the Double-A Mississippi Braves, but after four games he was promoted to the Triple-A Richmond Braves. Miner started 17 games for the Braves, going 2–7 with a 4.23 ERA.

=== Detroit Tigers ===
On July 31, 2005, the Braves traded Miner and relief pitcher Román Colón to the Detroit Tigers for setup man/closer Kyle Farnsworth.

Miner did not make the 25-man roster at the end of the 2006 spring training, but he was called up to the Tigers in May 2006 to replace the injured Mike Maroth. He was a reliable fifth starter but was moved to the bullpen near the end of the season. He was on the Tigers playoff roster as a reliever. He pitched once in the 2006 World Series against the St. Louis Cardinals.

In 2007 Zach started the season in Triple A Toledo, but was called up on May 17, and made a spot start against the Boston Red Sox in place of the sick Mike Maroth. After a brief return to Toledo, Miner was called up to help in the bullpen. He finished the season 3–4 while pitching in 34 games. Zach allowed 22 runs, 18 earned, through 53 2/3 innings.

Miner started the 2008 season with the Tigers, but was sent to Toledo July 2 after walking four batters in two innings in a loss to the Minnesota Twins. On July 21, Miner returned to the Tigers as a starter against the Kansas City Royals. Miner pitched six shutout innings in the Tigers 19–4 victory.

In April 2009, Miner came off a strong start in his first outing of the season to being roughed up in his second outing against the White Sox. In this game, he allowed back to back home runs to Jermaine Dye and Paul Konerko - the 300th of each man's career.

Miner underwent Tommy John surgery in June 2010 and missed the entire 2010 season, after which he was designated for assignment.

=== Kansas City Royals ===
Miner signed a minor league contract with the Kansas City Royals on December 31, 2010.

=== Detroit Tigers (second stint) ===
On April 20, 2012, Miner was traded back to the Detroit Tigers for cash considerations.

=== Philadelphia Phillies ===
Miner signed a minor league contract with Philadelphia in December 2012. He received a call up to the big leagues on August 3, and on September 20, joined the Phillies starting rotation after Kyle Kendrick was shut down for the remainder of the season. Miner made three starts, none lasting more than 4 innings. In his final MLB appearance on September 29, he took the loss after allowing 5 runs in 2 1/3 innings to Atlanta. In his first big league action since 2009, Miner was 0–2 with a 4.40 ERA in 28 2/3 innings. He was outrighted off the roster on October 3, then he elected free agency on October 7.

=== Seattle Mariners ===
Miner signed a minor league deal with the Seattle Mariners on February 13, 2014 that included a spring training invitation. He pitched in 21 games for the Triple-A Tacoma Rainiers, with a grim 8.60 ERA in his last stint in American affiliated baseball. He was released on June 9.

=== Lamigo Monkeys ===
Shortly after his release from the Mariners, Miner signed with the Lamigo Monkeys of the Chinese Professional Baseball League in Taiwan. In five starts, he had a 9.00 ERA.
