= Aaron Laffey =

American baseball player (born 1985)

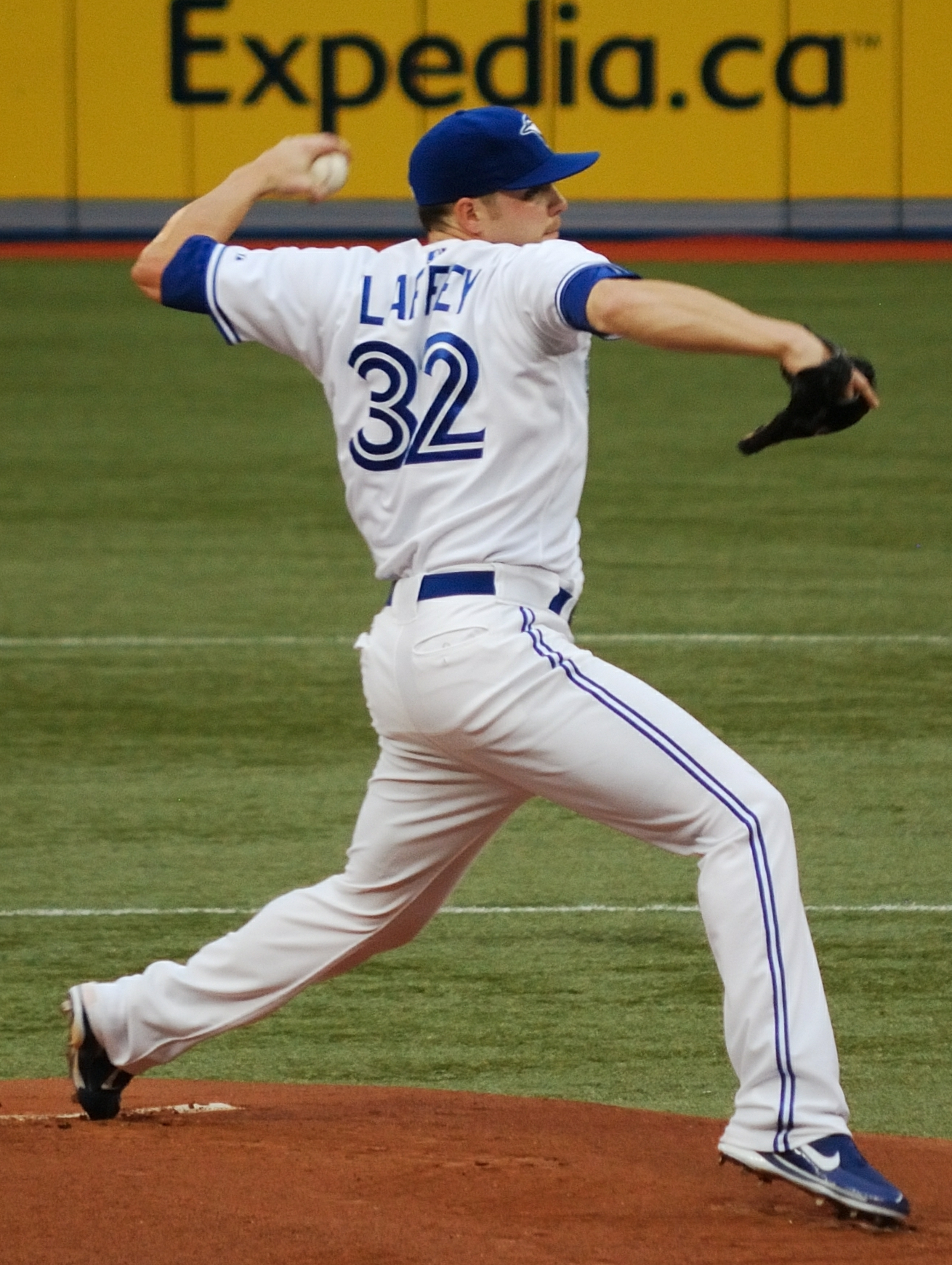
- Laffey with the Toronto Blue Jays
- Pitcher
- Born: April 15, 1985 (age 40); Cumberland, Maryland, U.S.
- Batted: Left Threw: Left

MLB debut
- August 4, 2007, for the Cleveland Indians

Last MLB appearance
- July 31, 2015, for the Colorado Rockies

MLB statistics
- Win–loss record: 26–29
- Earned run average: 4.44
- Strikeouts: 245
- Stats at Baseball Reference

Teams
- Cleveland Indians (2007–2010); Seattle Mariners (2011); New York Yankees (2011); Toronto Blue Jays (2012); New York Mets (2013); Toronto Blue Jays (2013); Colorado Rockies (2015)
Medals
Men's baseball
Representing United States
WBSC Premier12
Silver medal – second place	2015 Tokyo	Team

Aaron Steven Laffey (born April 15, 1985) is an American former professional baseball pitcher. He made his Major League Baseball (MLB) debut with the Cleveland Indians in 2007. He played in MLB with the Seattle Mariners, New York Yankees, Toronto Blue Jays, New York Mets, and Colorado Rockies, ending his tenure in MLB in 2015 and retiring as a player in 2018.

== Professional career ==
=== Cleveland Indians ===
Laffey was drafted out of high school by the Cleveland Indians in the 16th round (468th overall) of the 2003 Major League Baseball draft. He had committed to play college baseball at Virginia Tech, but signed with the Indians on July 1, 2003. He was assigned to begin his professional career with the Rookie-level Burlington Indians, and went 3–1 in nine games (four starts) while striking out 46 in 34 innings pitched. In 2004, while with the Single-A Mahoning Valley Scrappers, Laffey went 3–1 with a 1.24 ERA in eight starts, which earned him a promotion to the Single-A Lake County Captains. With the Captains, he was 3–7 with a 6.53 ERA in 19 games (15 starts). Laffey started the 2005 season with Lake County and went 7–7 with a 3.22 ERA in 25 games (23 starts). He was later called up to the Double-A Akron Aeros for one game in which he picked up the victory by going five innings and allowing two runs while striking out six. Laffey started the 2006 season with the Single-A Advanced Kinston Indians, where he posted a 4–1 record with a 2.18 ERA in 10 games (four starts). His performance earned him a promotion to Double-A Akron, where he went 8–3 with a 3.53 ERA in 19 starts. In 2007, Laffey was 4–1 with a 2.31 ERA in six starts with Akron before being promoted to the Triple-A Buffalo Bisons. Before his call up to the majors, he was 7–3 with a 3.28 ERA in 14 games (13 starts) for Buffalo.

On August 4, 2007, Laffey made his major league debut against the Minnesota Twins; he went 5 1/3 innings while allowing six hits, three runs, a walk, and three strikeouts in a losing effort. In his second start on August 9, against the Chicago White Sox, Laffey picked up his first MLB victory. He went 5 2/3 innings, allowed six hits, four runs, three walks, and struck out four in the Indians' 7–5 victory. On August 10, a day after Laffey's first MLB victory, he was demoted to Triple-A Buffalo. On August 25, Laffey was recalled to pitch against the Kansas City Royals. Laffey won again, going six innings and allowing eight hits, two runs, and one walk while striking out four. He made nine total starts with Cleveland in 2007, going 4–2 with a 4.56 ERA.

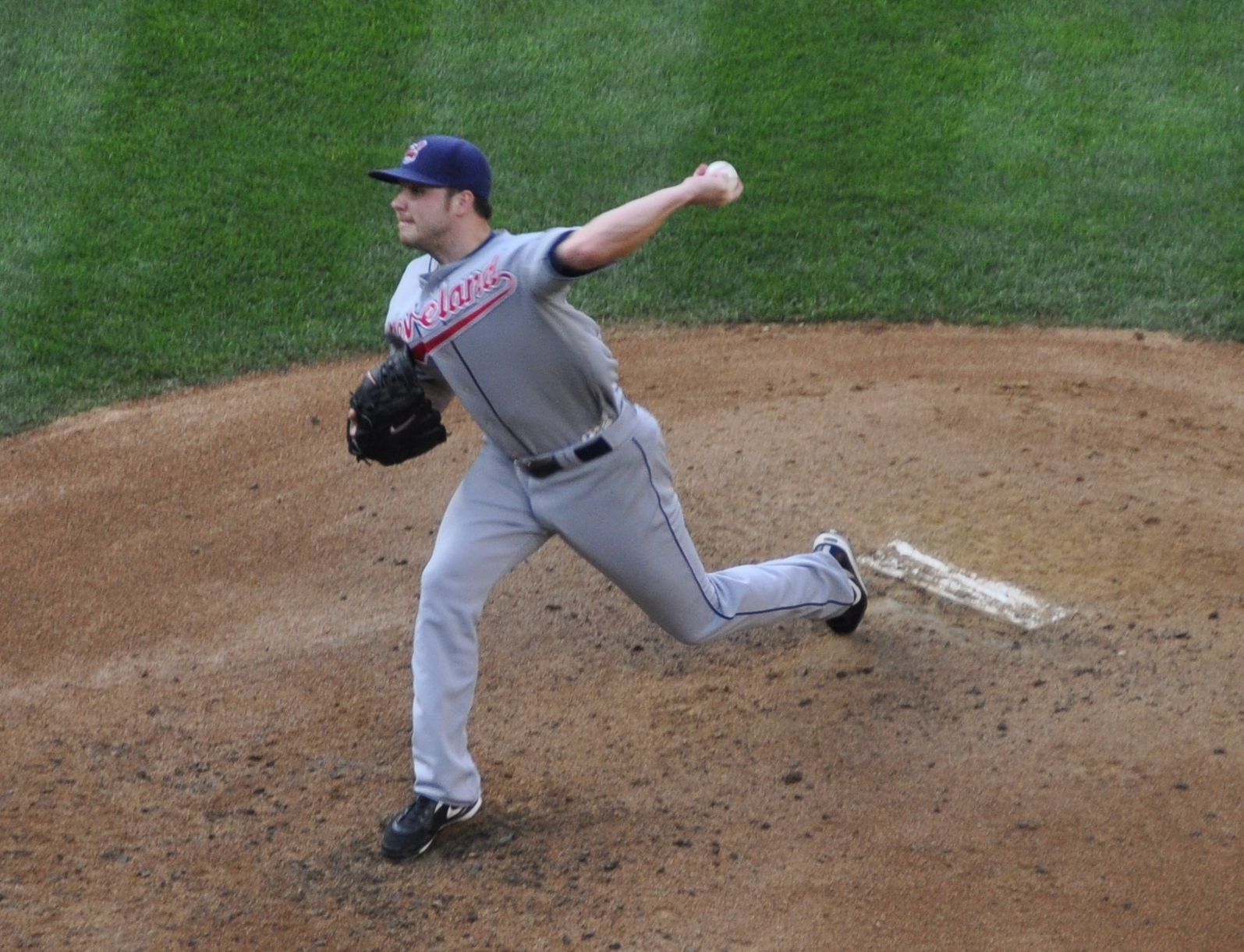
Laffey pitching for Cleveland in 2009

Laffey went into spring training in 2008 competing for the fifth spot in the rotation. However, Cliff Lee won the job, and Laffey was sent back to Buffalo. He was recalled on April 24 following an injury to Jake Westbrook. Laffey was named American League Rookie of the Month for May. Laffey had a 3–2 record and an 0.79 ERA for the month. Opponents batted .220 against him in May over a 34-inning span.

=== Seattle Mariners ===
On March 2, 2011, Laffey was traded to the Seattle Mariners for minor leaguer Matt Lawson. He was designated for assignment on August 17, after going 1–1 with a 4.01 ERA in 42 2/3 innings, spanning 36 appearances.

=== New York Yankees ===
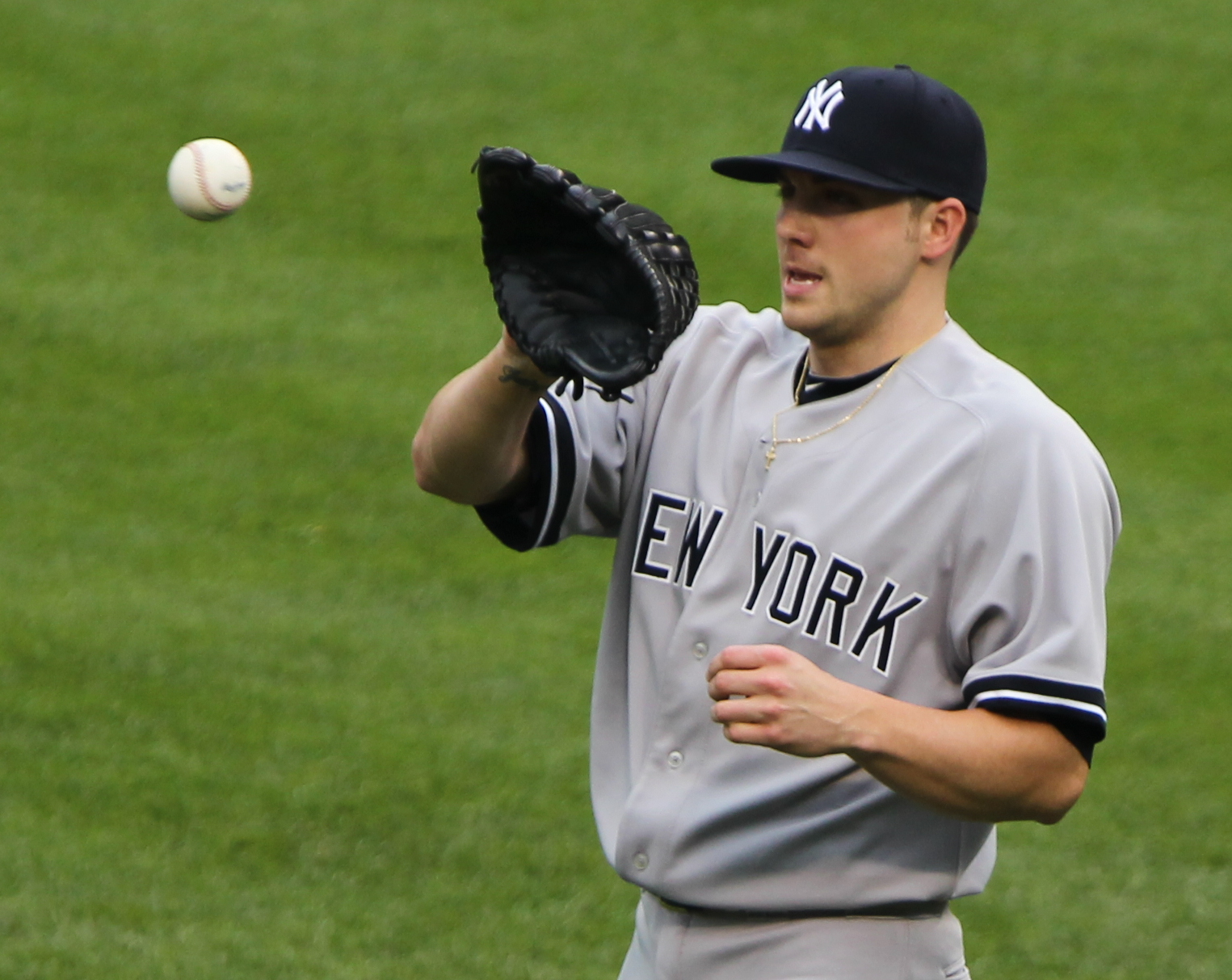
Laffey with the New York Yankees in 2011

Laffey was claimed off waivers by the New York Yankees on August 19, 2011. He made his debut the next night against the Minnesota Twins. He was designated for assignment the next day to clear a roster spot for Alex Rodriguez, though he was placed on optional waivers. Laffey cleared waivers and was sent to the Triple-A Scranton/Wilkes-Barre Yankees. He was called back up to the majors when the rosters expanded in September and pitched regularly as a reliever through the final weeks of the season. He had a 2–1 record and a 3.38 ERA in 11 relief appearances for the Yankees.

=== Toronto Blue Jays ===
Laffey was claimed off waivers by the Kansas City Royals on October 11, 2011. He was non-tendered by the Royals on December 12.

On December 30, Laffey signed a minor league contract with the Toronto Blue Jays. After failing to make the team out of spring training, Laffey had his contract purchased by Toronto on April 8, 2012. However, Laffey was sent back down to the Triple-A Las Vegas 51s on April 14 without having pitched for the Jays.

After pitching for six weeks in Las Vegas (compiling a 2–5 record and a 4.88 ERA in nine starts), Laffey was again called up to the majors on May 28 but was again sent back down just three days later without having thrown a pitch for the Blue Jays. Laffey made two more starts for Las Vegas (gpomgt 1–0) before being called up to the Jays for the third time on June 11. He finally pitched his first game as a Blue Jay on June 13, giving up two runs in three innings of relief work against the Washington Nationals. After several Blue Jays starters were shut down due to injuries, Laffey was added to the Blue Jays' starting rotation in late June. He finished the season with a 4–6 record and a 4.56 ERA in 22 games (16 starts).

On October 4, Laffey was outrighted to the minors, but he elected free agency instead.

=== New York Mets ===
On December 27, 2012, Laffey signed a minor league contract with the New York Mets. The deal included an invitation to major league spring training.

Laffey made his first start for the Mets on April 7, going 4 1/3 innings and giving up three earned runs, striking out five, and walking one in a 4–3 victory over the Miami Marlins. Laffey was designated for assignment on April 21. He had pitched four games (two starts) for the Mets, earning no decisions and finishing with a 7.20 ERA.

=== Toronto Blue Jays (second stint) ===
On April 23, 2013, the Blue Jays announced that they had claimed Laffey on waivers. He made his first start for the Blue Jays on April 26 against the Yankees, filling in for Josh Johnson, who was scratched due to a sore right triceps. Laffey pitched 2 2/3 innings, giving up two earned runs on two hits and walking five batters. He was designated for assignment following the game. The Blue Jays announced on April 29 that Laffey had refused an assignment to Triple-A and was a free agent.

=== Minor leagues (2013–2014) ===
On April 30, 2013, Laffey signed a minor league contract with the Los Angeles Dodgers. He was assigned to the Triple-A Albuquerque Isotopes on May 2. In 12 games (11 starts) for the Isotopes, he was 4–3 with a 5.61 ERA. He was released on July 1.

Laffey signed a minor league contract with the Milwaukee Brewers on July 11, 2013. He became a free agent following the season on November 4.

On January 23, 2014, Laffey signed a minor league contract with the Baltimore Orioles. He was released on March 24.

Laffey signed a minor league contract with Washington Nationals on March 30, and spent the entire season with the Triple-A Syracuse Chiefs, compiling a 12–6 record and a 3.67 ERA in 25 games (21 starts). He became a free agent following the season.

=== Colorado Rockies ===
Laffey signed a minor league deal with the Colorado Rockies on November 22, 2014. He was promoted to the major leagues in 2015, pitching in three games for the team (1–0, 3.68 ERA), and was designated for assignment on July 11. He cleared waivers and was sent outright to Triple-A Albuquerque Isotopes on July 13. He had his contract selected again on July 28. He was once again designated for assignment on August 1, and cleared waivers and was sent outright to Triple-A Albuquerque Isotopes on August 4. He elected free agency following the season on October 14.

=== Washington Nationals (second stint) ===
On December 19, 2015, Laffey signed a minor league contract to return to the Washington Nationals organization. He spent the 2016 season with the Triple-A Syracuse Nationals, going 6–6 with a 3.82 ERA and 68 strikeouts across 29 games (14 starts). Laffey elected free agency following the season on November 7.

=== Somerset Patriots ===
On April 3, 2017, Laffey signed with the Somerset Patriots of the Atlantic League of Professional Baseball. In four starts for the Patriots, he went 1–1 while registering a 2.82 ERA with 19 strikeouts in 22 1/3 innings pitched.

=== Arizona Diamondbacks ===
On May 15, 2017, Laffey signed a minor league contract with the Arizona Diamondbacks organization. In 21 games (13 starts) with the Triple-A Reno Aces, he recorded a 5.42 ERA with 44 strikeouts across 79 2/3 innings of work. Laffey elected free agency following the season on November 6.

=== Somerset Patriots (second stint) ===
On April 11, 2018, Laffey signed with the Somerset Patriots of the Atlantic League of Professional Baseball. He made four starts, throwing 20 1/3 innings and going 2–0 with a 3.10 ERA and 13 strikeouts.

=== New York Mets ===
On May 22, 2018, Laffey's contract was purchased by the New York Mets. On June 6, following a start for the Las Vegas 51s where he allowed 14 runs (12 earned), he announced his retirement.

== Player profile ==
Laffey's secondary pitches were an above-average slider and changeup. He primarily throws an 87-88 mph sinker which classifies him as a ground-ball pitcher.

== Personal life ==
Laffey married his wife on December 1, 2007 after a three-year engagement. They have three children, born June 27, 2010, November 10, 2011, and February 27, 2015.
