= 2009 Arizona Diamondbacks season =

Professional baseball season

2009 Arizona Diamondbacks
- League: National League
- Division: West
- Ballpark: Chase Field
- City: Phoenix, Arizona
- Record: 70–92 (.432)
- Divisional place: 5th
- Owners: Ken Kendrick
- General managers: Josh Byrnes
- Managers: Bob Melvin, A. J. Hinch
- Television: FS Arizona (Daron Sutton, Mark Grace, Greg Schulte, Joe Garagiola, Tom Candiotti)
- Radio: KTAR (620 AM) (Greg Schulte, Jeff Munn, Tom Candiotti); KSUN (Spanish)

The Arizona Diamondbacks' 2009 season was the franchise's 12th season in Major League Baseball.

== Regular season ==
=== Season standings ===
NL West
| Team | W | L | Pct. | GB | Home | Road |
|---|---|---|---|---|---|---|
| Los Angeles Dodgers | 95 | 67 | .586 | — | 50‍–‍31 | 45‍–‍36 |
| Colorado Rockies | 92 | 70 | .568 | 3 | 51‍–‍30 | 41‍–‍40 |
| San Francisco Giants | 88 | 74 | .543 | 7 | 52‍–‍29 | 36‍–‍45 |
| San Diego Padres | 75 | 87 | .463 | 20 | 42‍–‍39 | 33‍–‍48 |
| Arizona Diamondbacks | 70 | 92 | .432 | 25 | 36‍–‍45 | 34‍–‍47 |

=== Record vs. opponents ===
2009 National League record Source: MLB Standings Grid – 2009
| Team | AZ | ATL | CHC | CIN | COL | FLA | HOU | LAD | MIL | NYM | PHI | PIT | SD | SF | STL | WAS | AL |
|---|---|---|---|---|---|---|---|---|---|---|---|---|---|---|---|---|---|
| Arizona | – | 3–4 | 4-2 | 1–5 | 7-11 | 5–3 | 5–4 | 7-11 | 2–5 | 5–2 | 1–5 | 6–1 | 11-7 | 5-13 | 2–4 | 1–5 | 5–10 |
| Atlanta | 4–3 | – | 4–2 | 3–6 | 4–4 | 8-10 | 3-3 | 4–3 | 3–3 | 13–5 | 10-8 | 3–4 | 3–3 | 3–4 | 4–2 | 10-8 | 7–8 |
| Chicago | 2-4 | 2–4 | – | 10-5 | 2–4 | 4–3 | 11–6 | 3–5 | 10-7 | 3-3 | 1–5 | 10-4 | 4–5 | 4-2 | 6-10 | 5–2 | 6–9 |
| Cincinnati | 5-1 | 6-3 | 5-10 | – | 0-7 | 3-3 | 12-4 | 1-5 | 8-7 | 2-4 | 2-5 | 13-5 | 1-6 | 3-3 | 8-8 | 3-4 | 6-9 |
| Colorado | 11-7 | 4-4 | 4-2 | 7-0 | – | 2-4 | 2-5 | 4-14 | 6-0 | 3-4 | 2-4 | 6-3 | 10-8 | 8-10 | 6-1 | 6-0 | 11-4 |
| Florida | 3-5 | 10-8 | 3-4 | 3-3 | 4-2 | – | 4–3 | 3-3 | 3-4 | 11-7 | 9-9 | 2-4 | 4-2 | 3-4 | 3-3 | 12-6 | 10-8 |
| Houston | 4–5 | 3-3 | 6-11 | 4-12 | 5-2 | 3-4 | – | 4–3 | 5-10 | 1-5 | 6-2 | 10-5 | 6-1 | 2-4 | 6-9 | 3-3 | 6-9 |
| Los Angeles | 11-7 | 3-4 | 5-3 | 5-1 | 14-4 | 3-3 | 3-4 | – | 3–3 | 5-1 | 4-3 | 4-3 | 10-8 | 11-7 | 2-5 | 3-2 | 9-9 |
| Milwaukee | 5-2 | 3-3 | 7-10 | 7-8 | 0-6 | 4-3 | 10-5 | 3-3 | – | 3-3 | 4-3 | 9-5 | 2-4 | 4-5 | 9-9 | 5-3 | 5-10 |
| New York | 2-5 | 5-13 | 3-3 | 4-2 | 4-3 | 7-11 | 5-1 | 1-5 | 3-3 | – | 6-12 | 4-3 | 2-5 | 5-3 | 4-5 | 10-8 | 5–10 |
| Philadelphia | 5-1 | 8-10 | 5-1 | 5-2 | 4-2 | 9-9 | 2-6 | 3-4 | 3-4 | 12-6 | – | 4-2 | 5-2 | 3-4 | 4-1 | 15-3 | 6-12 |
| Pittsburgh | 1-6 | 4-3 | 4-10 | 5-13 | 3-6 | 4-2 | 5-10 | 3-4 | 5-9 | 3-4 | 2-4 | – | 3-4 | 2-4 | 5-10 | 5-3 | 8–7 |
| San Diego | 7-11 | 3-3 | 5-4 | 6-1 | 8-10 | 2-4 | 1-6 | 8-10 | 4-2 | 5-2 | 2-5 | 4-3 | – | 10-8 | 1-6 | 4-2 | 5–10 |
| San Francisco | 13-5 | 4–3 | 2–4 | 3–3 | 10-8 | 4–3 | 4–2 | 7-11 | 5-4 | 3–5 | 4–3 | 4–2 | 8-10 | – | 4–3 | 4–2 | 9–6 |
| St. Louis | 4-2 | 2-4 | 10-6 | 8-8 | 1-6 | 3-3 | 9-6 | 5-2 | 9-9 | 5-4 | 1-4 | 10-5 | 6-1 | 3-4 | – | 6–1 | 9–6 |
| Washington | 5-1 | 8-10 | 2-5 | 4-3 | 0-6 | 6-12 | 3-3 | 2-3 | 3-5 | 8-10 | 3-15 | 3-5 | 2-4 | 2-4 | 1-6 | – | 7–11 |

=== Game log ===
Legend
| Diamondbacks Win | Diamondbacks Loss | Game postponed |

2009 Game Log (70–92)
April (9–13)

| # | Date | Opponent | Score | Win | Loss | Save | Attendance | Record |
|---|---|---|---|---|---|---|---|---|
| 1 | April 6 | Rockies | 9–8 | Peña (1–0) | Grilli (0–1) | Qualls (1) | 48,799 | 1–0 |
| 2 | April 7 | Rockies | 3–0 | Jiménez (1–0) | Haren (0–1) | Street (1) | 26,637 | 1–1 |
| 3 | April 8 | Rockies | 9–2 | Morales (1–0) | Davis (0–1) | | 18,227 | 1–2 |
| 4 | April 10 | Dodgers | 9–4 | Garland (1–0) | McDonald (0–1) | | 31,036 | 2–2 |
| 5 | April 11 | Dodgers | 11–2 | Stults (1–0) | Petit (0–1) | | 35,024 | 2–3 |
| 6 | April 12 | Dodgers | 3–1 | Wolf (1–1) | Haren (0–2) | Broxton (3) | 25,485 | 2–4 |
| 7 | April 13 | Cardinals | 2–1 | Wellemeyer (1–1) | Davis (0–2) | Franklin (1) | 25,014 | 2–5 |
| 8 | April 14 | Cardinals | 7–6 (10) | Peña (2–0) | Thompson (0–1) | | 25,678 | 3–5 |
| 9 | April 15 | Cardinals | 12–7 | Piñeiro (2–0) | Garland (1–1) | | 21,298 | 3–6 |
| 10 | April 17 | @ Giants | 2–0 | Sánchez (1–1) | Haren (0–3) | Wilson (1) | 34,898 | 3–7 |
| 11 | April 18 | @ Giants | 2–0 | Davis (1–2) | Affeldt (0–1) | Qualls (2) | 37,409 | 4–7 |
| 12 | April 19 | @ Giants | 2–0 | Johnson (1–2) | Scherzer (0–1) | Wilson (2) | 35,350 | 4–8 |
| 13 | April 20 | Rockies | 6–3 | Garland (2–1) | Marquis (2–1) | Qualls (3) | 25,788 | 5–8 |
| 14 | April 21 | Rockies | 9–6 | Belisle (1–0) | Gutiérrez (0–1) | Corpas (1) | 25,411 | 5–9 |
| 15 | April 22 | Rockies | 2–0 | Haren (1–3) | de la Rosa (0–2) | Qualls (4) | 19,147 | 6–9 |
| 16 | April 24 | Giants | 5–1 | Lincecum (1–1) | Davis (1–3) | | 27,865 | 6–10 |
| 17 | April 25 | Giants | 5–3 | Miller (1–0) | Scherzer (0–2) | Wilson (3) | 37,253 | 6–11 |
| 18 | April 26 | Giants | 5–4 (12) | Gutiérrez (1–1) | Medders (0–1) | | 31,862 | 7–11 |
| 19 | April 27 | Cubs | 7–2 | Haren (2–3) | Lilly (2–2) | | 29,471 | 8–11 |
| 20 | April 28 | Cubs | 11–3 | Zambrano (2–1) | Petit (0–2) | | 30,351 | 8–12 |
| 21 | April 29 | Cubs | 10–0 | Davis (2–3) | Dempster (1–1) | | 26,999 | 9–12 |
| 22 | April 30 | @ Brewers | 4–1 | DiFelice (2–0) | Gordon (0–1) | Hoffman (2) | 26,464 | 9–13 |

May (13–16)

| # | Date | Opponent | Score | Win | Loss | Save | Attendance | Record |
|---|---|---|---|---|---|---|---|---|
| 23 | May 1 | @ Brewers | 5–2 | Peña (3–0) | Villanueva (1–3) | Qualls (5) | 42,810 | 10–13 |
| 24 | May 2 | @ Brewers | 4–1 | Haren (3–3) | Looper (2–1) | Qualls (6) | 42,422 | 11–13 |
| 25 | May 3 | @ Brewers | 4–3 | Stetter (1–0) | Gutiérrez (1–2) | Hoffman (3) | 44,727 | 11–14 |
| 26 | May 4 | @ Dodgers | 7–2 | Stults (3–1) | Davis (2–4) | | 30,530 | 11–15 |
| 27 | May 5 | @ Dodgers | 3–1 | Weaver (1–0) | Scherzer (0–3) | Broxton (8) | 33,557 | 11–16 |
| 28 | May 6 | @ Padres | 3–1 | Garland (3–1) | Peavy (2–4) | Qualls (7) | 15,092 | 12–16 |
| 29 | May 7 | @ Padres | 4–3 (10) | Meredith (4–0) | Vásquez (0–1) | | 18,921 | 12–17 |
| 30 | May 8 | Nationals | 5–4 | Martis (4–0) | Petit (0–3) | Wells (1) | 28,640 | 12–18 |
| 31 | May 9 | Nationals | 2–1 | Lannan (2–3) | Davis (2–5) | Hanrahan (3) | 27,233 | 12–19 |
| 32 | May 10 | Nationals | 10–8 | Vásquez (1–1) | Kensing (0–2) | Qualls (8) | 25,086 | 13–19 |
| 33 | May 11 | Reds | 13–5 | Arroyo (5–2) | Garland (3–2) | | 17,640 | 13–20 |
| 34 | May 12 | Reds | 3–1 | Owings (3–3) | Haren (3–4) | Cordero (10) | 24,835 | 13–21 |
| 35 | May 13 | Reds | 10–3 | Cueto (4–1) | Augenstein (0–1) | | 20,443 | 13–22 |
| 36 | May 15 | @ Braves | 4–3 | González (2–0) | Peña (3–1) | | 32,593 | 13–23 |
| 37 | May 16 | @ Braves | 12–0 | Scherzer (1–3) | Kawakami (2–5) | | 30,162 | 14–23 |
| | May 17 | @ Braves | Postponed | | | | | |
| | May 18 | @ Marlins | Postponed | | | | | |
| 38 | May 19 | @ Marlins | 5–3 | Garland (4–2) | Johnson (3–1) | Qualls (9) | 10,131 | 15–23 |
| 39 | May 20 | @ Marlins | 8–6 | Volstad (3–3) | Davis (2–6) | Lindstrom (8) | | 15–24 |
| 40 | May 20 | @ Marlins | 11–9 (13) | Qualls (1–0) | Núñez (2–1) | Rauch (1) | 14,426 | 16–24 |
| 41 | May 21 | @ Marlins | 4–3 | Zavada (1–0) | Martínez (0–1) | Qualls (10) | 12,045 | 17–24 |
| 42 | May 22 | @ Athletics | 2–1 | Buckner (1–0) | Cahill (2–4) | Rauch (2) | 13,586 | 18–24 |
| 43 | May 23 | @ Athletics | 8–7 (11) | Peña (4–1) | Breslow (1–3) | Qualls (11) | 21,295 | 19–24 |
| 44 | May 24 | @ Athletics | 6–2 | Outman (2–0) | Garland (4–3) | | 13,792 | 19–25 |
| 45 | May 25 | Padres | 9–7 (10) | Mujica (2–1) | Peña (4–2) | Bell (13) | 30,546 | 19–26 |
| 46 | May 26 | Padres | 6–5 | Scherzer (2–3) | Correia (1–3) | Gutiérrez (1) | 18,631 | 20–26 |
| 47 | May 27 | Padres | 8–5 | Peavy (5–5) | Buckner (1–1) | Bell (14) | 18,264 | 20–27 |
| 48 | May 28 | Braves | 5–2 | Haren (4–4) | Lowe (6–3) | Qualls (12) | 19,452 | 21–27 |
| 49 | May 29 | Braves | 10–6 | Jurrjens (5–2) | Garland (4–4) | | 26,146 | 21–28 |
| 50 | May 30 | Braves | 3–2 (11) | Peña (5–2) | Bennett (2–2) | | 35,039 | 22–28 |
| 51 | May 31 | Braves | 9–3 | Medlen (1–2) | Scherzer (2–4) | | 30,020 | 22–29 |

June (9–17)

| # | Date | Opponent | Score | Win | Loss | Save | Attendance | Record |
|---|---|---|---|---|---|---|---|---|
| 52 | June 1 | @ Dodgers | 3–2 | Buckner (2–1) | Kuroda (1–1) | Peña (1) | 32,304 | 23–29 |
| 53 | June 2 | @ Dodgers | 6–5 | Weaver (3–1) | Schlereth (0–1) | Broxton (12) | 32,853 | 23–30 |
| 54 | June 3 | @ Dodgers | 1–0 | Billingsley (7–3) | Garland (4–5) | Broxton (13) | 33,804 | 23–31 |
| 55 | June 5 | @ Padres | 8–0 | Davis (3–6) | Gaudin (2–4) | | 22,426 | 24–31 |
| 56 | June 6 | @ Padres | 6–4 | Correia (2–4) | Schlereth (0–2) | Bell (16) | 23,592 | 24–32 |
| 57 | June 7 | @ Padres | 9–6 (18) | Rosales (1–0) | Wilson (0–1) | | 27,804 | 25–32 |
| 58 | June 8 | @ Padres | 6–3 | Peavy (6–6) | Garland (4–6) | Bell (17) | 17,501 | 25–33 |
| 59 | June 9 | Giants | 9–4 | Cain (8–1) | Buckner (2–2) | | 22,428 | 25–34 |
| 60 | June 10 | Giants | 6–4 | Zito (3–6) | Davis (3–7) | Wilson (16) | 19,837 | 25–35 |
| 61 | June 11 | Giants | 2–1 | Scherzer (3–4) | Sánchez (2–6) | Qualls (13) | 24,389 | 26–35 |
| 62 | June 12 | Astros | 8–1 | Haren (5–4) | Hampton (4–5) | | 22,225 | 27–35 |
| 63 | June 13 | Astros | 6–4 | Oswalt (3–3) | Garland (4–7) | Hawkins (9) | 29,206 | 27–36 |
| 64 | June 14 | Astros | 8–3 | Moehler (3–4) | Buckner (2–3) | | 26,937 | 27–37 |
| 65 | June 16 | @ Royals | 5–0 | Meche (4–5) | Davis (3–8) | | 26,974 | 27–38 |
| 66 | June 17 | @ Royals | 12–5 | Scherzer (4–4) | Greinke (8–3) | | 29,777 | 28–38 |
| 67 | June 18 | @ Royals | 12–5 | Haren (6–4) | Hochevar (2–3) | | 14,129 | 29–38 |
| 68 | June 19 | @ Mariners | 4–3 | Batista (4–2) | Peña (5–3) | Aardsma (13) | 27,319 | 29–39 |
| 69 | June 20 | @ Mariners | 7–3 | Vargas (3–2) | Buckner (2–4) | Aardsma (14) | 29,525 | 29–40 |
| 70 | June 21 | @ Mariners | 3–2 | Lowe (1–4) | Zavada (1–1) | | 37,251 | 29–41 |
| 71 | June 23 | Rangers | 8–2 | Scherzer (5–4) | Harrison (4–5) | | 21,379 | 30–41 |
| 72 | June 24 | Rangers | 2–1 | Padilla (6–3) | Haren (6–5) | Wilson (7) | 20,031 | 30–42 |
| 73 | June 25 | Rangers | 9–8 | Guardado (1–1) | Vásquez (1–2) | Jennings (1) | 19,376 | 30–43 |
| 74 | June 26 | Angels | 12–3 | Weaver (8–3) | Buckner (2–5) | | 24,870 | 30–44 |
| 75 | June 27 | Angels | 2–1 | Oliver (2–0) | Qualls (1–1) | Fuentes (21) | 27,742 | 30–45 |
| 76 | June 28 | Angels | 12–8 | Palmer (7–1) | Scherzer (5–5) | | 25,684 | 30–46 |
| 77 | June 30 | @ Reds | 6–2 | Haren (7–5) | Arroyo (8–7) | | 22,725 | 31–46 |

July (14–12)

| # | Date | Opponent | Score | Win | Loss | Save | Attendance | Record |
|---|---|---|---|---|---|---|---|---|
| 78 | July 1 | @ Reds | 1–0 | Cueto (8–4) | Garland (4–8) | Cordero (19) | 20,374 | 31–47 |
| 79 | July 2 | @ Reds | 3–2 | Cordero (1–2) | Zavada (1–2) | | 19,592 | 31–48 |
| 80 | July 3 | @ Rockies | 5–0 | de la Rosa (5–7) | Scherzer (5–6) | | 49,026 | 31–49 |
| 81 | July 4 | @ Rockies | 11–7 | Schoeneweis (1–0) | Peralta (0–2) | Qualls (14) | 49,096 | 32–49 |
| 82 | July 5 | @ Rockies | 4–3 | Haren (8–5) | Jiménez (6–8) | Qualls (15) | 27,547 | 33–49 |
| 83 | July 6 | Padres | 6–5 | Rauch (1–0) | Meredith (4–2) | | 17,528 | 34–49 |
| 84 | July 7 | Padres | 4–3 | Davis (4–8) | Correia (5–7) | Qualls (16) | 18,619 | 35–49 |
| 85 | July 8 | Padres | 6–2 | Zavada (2–2) | Burke (1–1) | | 20,791 | 36–49 |
| 86 | July 9 | Marlins | 14–7 | Calero (2–0) | Schoeneweis (1–1) | | 21,558 | 36–50 |
| 87 | July 10 | Marlins | 8–0 | Haren (9–5) | Nolasco (6–7) | | 21,307 | 37–50 |
| 88 | July 11 | Marlins | 5–1 | Garland (5–8) | West (3–4) | | 29,477 | 38–50 |
| 89 | July 12 | Marlins | 8–1 | Johnson (8–2) | Davis (4–9) | | 28,617 | 38–51 |
| 90 | July 17 | @ Cardinals | 6–1 | Carpenter (8–3) | Garland (5–9) | | 44,781 | 38–52 |
| 91 | July 18 | @ Cardinals | 4–2 | Haren (10–5) | Wainwright (10–6) | Qualls (17) | 45,267 | 39–52 |
| 92 | July 19 | @ Cardinals | 2–1 | Piñeiro (8–9) | Petit (0–4) | Franklin (22) | 41,759 | 39–53 |
| 93 | July 20 | @ Rockies | 10–6 | de la Rosa (7–7) | Davis (4–10) | | 40,444 | 39–54 |
| 94 | July 21 | @ Rockies | 6–5 | Gutiérrez (2–2) | Rincón (2–1) | Qualls (18) | 30,248 | 40–54 |
| 95 | July 22 | @ Rockies | 4–3 | Rincón (3–1) | Schoeneweis (1–2) | Street (24) | 30,451 | 40–55 |
| 96 | July 23 | Pirates | 11–4 | Gutiérrez (3–2) | Meek (1–1) | | 24,008 | 41–55 |
| 97 | July 24 | Pirates | 10–3 | Duke (9–9) | Petit (0–5) | | 24,911 | 41–56 |
| 98 | July 25 | Pirates | 7–0 | Davis (5–10) | Ohlendorf (8–8) | | 26,037 | 42–56 |
| 99 | July 26 | Pirates | 9–0 | Scherzer (6–6) | Vasquez (1–5) | | 27,507 | 43–56 |
| 100 | July 27 | Phillies | 6–2 | Moyer (10–7) | Garland (5–10) | | 20,565 | 43–57 |
| 101 | July 28 | Phillies | 4–3 | Hamels (7–5) | Haren (10–6) | Lidge (20) | 25,044 | 43–58 |
| 102 | July 29 | Phillies | 4–0 | Petit (1–5) | Happ (7–2) | | 22,952 | 44–58 |
| 103 | July 31 | @ Mets | 3–2 | Vásquez (2–2) | Green (1–3) | Qualls (19) | 38,241 | 45–58 |

August (15–14)

| # | Date | Opponent | Score | Win | Loss | Save | Attendance | Record |
|---|---|---|---|---|---|---|---|---|
| 104 | August 1 | @ Mets | 9–6 | Feliciano (4–3) | Zavada (2–3) | Rodríguez (24) | 39,574 | 45–59 |
| 105 | August 2 | @ Mets | 5–2 | Garland (6–10) | Pelfrey (8–7) | | 38,374 | 46–59 |
| 106 | August 3 | @ Mets | 6–5 | Haren (11–6) | Figueroa (0–2) | Qualls (20) | 39,320 | 47–59 |
| 107 | August 4 | @ Pirates | 6–0 | Petit (2–5) | Duke (9–10) | | 11,294 | 48–59 |
| 108 | August 5 | @ Pirates | 4–3 | Davis (6–10) | Hanrahan (1–4) | Qualls (21) | 11,470 | 49–59 |
| 109 | August 6 | @ Pirates | 11–6 (12) | Rauch (2–0) | Jackson (2–2) | | 17,311 | 50–59 |
| 110 | August 7 | @ Nationals | 7–6 | Bergmann (2–1) | Gutiérrez (3–3) | MacDougal (11) | 22,674 | 50–60 |
| 111 | August 8 | @ Nationals | 5–2 | Mock (1–4) | Haren (11–7) | Sosa (1) | 24,551 | 50–61 |
| 112 | August 9 | @ Nationals | 9–2 | Martin (1–2) | Petit (2–6) | Sosa (2) | 19,938 | 50–62 |
| 113 | August 10 | Mets | 7–4 | Davis (7–10) | Pelfrey (8–8) | | 23,069 | 51–62 |
| 114 | August 11 | Mets | 6–2 | Scherzer (7–6) | Hernández (7–7) | | 24,576 | 52–62 |
| 115 | August 12 | Mets | 6–4 | Feliciano (5–4) | Rauch (2–1) | Rodríguez (25) | 22,320 | 52–63 |
| 116 | August 14 | Dodgers | 4–1 | Haren (12–7) | Kershaw (8–7) | Qualls (22) | 31,573 | 53–63 |
| 117 | August 15 | Dodgers | 4–3 (10) | Qualls (2–1) | Troncoso (4–2) | | 42,058 | 54–63 |
| 118 | August 16 | Dodgers | 9–3 | Wolf (7–6) | Petit (2–7) | | 34,012 | 54–64 |
| 119 | August 17 | @ Braves | 9–4 | Hanson (8–2) | Scherzer (7–7) | | 23,668 | 54–65 |
| 120 | August 18 | @ Phillies | 5–1 | Moyer (11–9) | Garland (6–11) | | 45,186 | 54–66 |
| 121 | August 19 | @ Phillies | 8–1 | Lee (4–0) | Haren (12–8) | | 45,356 | 54–67 |
| 122 | August 20 | @ Phillies | 12–3 | Blanton (8–6) | Davis (7–11) | | 45,172 | 54–68 |
| 123 | August 21 | @ Astros | 1–0 | Oswalt (7–4) | Petit (2–8) | Valverde (19) | 30,032 | 54–69 |
| 124 | August 22 | @ Astros | 4–2 | Moehler (8–9) | Scherzer (7–8) | Hawkins (11) | 39,412 | 54–70 |
| 125 | August 23 | @ Astros | 7–5 | Garland (7–11) | Norris (3–2) | Qualls (23) | 30,612 | 55–70 |
| 126 | August 25 | @ Giants | 5–4 | Affeldt (1–1) | Rauch (2–2) | Romo (2) | 37,492 | 55–71 |
| 127 | August 26 | @ Giants | 4–3 | Miller (3–3) | Qualls (2–2) | Medders (1) | 27,645 | 55–72 |
| 128 | August 27 | @ Giants | 11–0 | Petit (3–8) | Martinez (3–2) | | 28,575 | 56–72 |
| 129 | August 28 | Astros | 14–7 | Scherzer (8–8) | Bazardo (0–1) | | 26,190 | 57–72 |
| 130 | August 29 | Astros | 9–0 | Garland (8–11) | Norris (3–3) | | 37,190 | 58–72 |
| 131 | August 30 | Astros | 4–3 | Haren (13–8) | Rodríguez (12–9) | Qualls (24) | 29,062 | 59–72 |
| 132 | August 31 | @ Dodgers | 5–3 (10) | Vásquez (3–2) | McDonald (4–4) | Gutiérrez (2) | 45,211 | 60–72 |

September/October (10–20)

| # | Date | Opponent | Score | Win | Loss | Save | Attendance | Record |
|---|---|---|---|---|---|---|---|---|
| 133 | September 1 | @ Dodgers | 4–3 | Belisario (3–3) | Rosales (1–1) | Broxton (30) | 45,433 | 60–73 |
| 134 | September 2 | @ Dodgers | 4–1 | Scherzer (9–8) | Billingsley (12–9) | Gutiérrez (3) | 45,076 | 61–73 |
| 135 | September 3 | @ Dodgers | 4–2 | Garland (9–11) | Buckner (2–6) | Broxton (31) | 45,365 | 61–74 |
| 136 | September 4 | @ Rockies | 4–1 | Betancourt (2–3) | Boyer (0–2) | Morales (2) | 31,401 | 61–75 |
| 137 | September 5 | @ Rockies | 5–4 | Contreras (6–13) | Davis (7–12) | Morales (3) | 39,297 | 61–76 |
| 138 | September 6 | @ Rockies | 13–5 | de la Rosa (14–9) | Petit (3–9) | | 35,192 | 61–77 |
| 139 | September 7 | Dodgers | 7–2 | Padilla (10–6) | Scherzer (9–9) | | 28,317 | 61–78 |
| 140 | September 8 | Dodgers | 5–4 | McDonald (5–4) | Schlereth (0–3) | Broxton (34) | 22,589 | 61–79 |
| 141 | September 9 | Dodgers | 4–3 | Gutierrez (4–3) | Troncoso (4–3) | | 20,025 | 62–79 |
| 142 | September 11 | Brewers | 6–3 | Looper (12–6) | Davis (7–13) | | | 62–80 |
| 143 | September 12 | Brewers | 9–2 | Bush (4–7) | Mulvey (0–1) | | | 62–81 |
| 144 | September 13 | Brewers | 5–3 | Villanueva (3–10) | Schlereth (0–4) | | | 62–82 |
| 145 | September 14 | @ Padres | 4–2 | Zavada (3–3) | Russell (2–1) | | | 63–82 |
| 146 | September 15 | @ Padres | 4–2 | Haren (14–8) | Bell (5–4) | | | 64–82 |
| 147 | September 16 | @ Padres | 5–6 | Bell (6–4) | Petit (3–10) | | | 64–83 |
| 148 | September 18 | Rockies | 7–5 | Rosales (2–1) | Flores (0–1) | | | 65–83 |
| 149 | September 19 | Rockies | 10–4 | Hammel (9–8) | Scherzer (9–10) | | | 65–84 |
| 150 | September 20 | Rockies | 5–1 | Jimenez (14–11) | Haren (14–9) | | | 65–85 |
| 151 | September 21 | Giants | 5–4 | Romo (5–2) | Vasquez (3–3) | | | 65–86 |
| 152 | September 22 | Giants | 10–8 | Davis (8–13) | Cain (13–7) | | | 66–86 |
| 153 | September 23 | Giants | 5–2 | Sanchez (7–12) | Mulvey (0–2) | | | 66–87 |
| 154 | September 25 | Padres | 4–0 | Correia (12–10) | Scherzer (9–11) | | | 66–88 |
| 155 | September 26 | Padres | 8–5 | Schlereth (1–4) | Gregerson (2–4) | | | 67–88 |
| 156 | September 27 | Padres | 7–4 | Buckner (3–6) | Mujica (3–5) | | | 68–88 |
| 157 | September 29 | @ Giants | 8–4 | Sanchez (8–12) | Davis (8–14) | | | 68–89 |
| 158 | September 30 | @ Giants | 4–1 | Penny (11–9) | Mulvey (0–3) | | | 68–90 |
| 159 | October 1 | @ Giants | 7–3 | Lincecum (15–7) | Haren (14–10) | | | 68–91 |
| 160 | October 2 | @ Cubs | 12–3 | Buckner (4–6) | Gorzelanny (7–3) | | | 69–91 |
| 161 | October 3 | @ Cubs | 5–0 | Wells (12–10) | Cabrera (0–6) | | | 69–92 |
| 162 | October 4 | @ Cubs | 5–2 | Davis (9–14) | Dempster (11–9) | | | 70–92 |

Please do not edit this line: OgreBot End-->

=== Roster ===
2009 Arizona Diamondbacks
Roster
| Pitchers: 44 Bryan Augenstein; 55 Blaine Boyer; 33 Billy Buckner; 56 Daniel Cabrera; 49 Doug Davis; 52 Jon Garland; 36 Tom Gordon; 58 Juan Gutiérrez; 15 Dan Haren; 54 Bobby Korecky; 57 Kevin Mulvey; 56 Tony Peña; 48 Yusmeiro Petit; 50 Chad Qualls; 57 Jon Rauch; 47 Leo Rosales; 39 Max Scherzer; 46 Daniel Schlereth; 60 Scott Schoeneweis; 45 Doug Slaten; 32 Esmerling Vásquez; 17 Brandon Webb; 35 Clay Zavada | Catchers: 38 Luke Carlin; 31 John Hester; 26 Miguel Montero; 19 Chris Snyder; Infielders: 25 Brandon Allen; 31 Tony Clark; 6 Stephen Drew; 2 Felipe López; 11 Augie Ojeda; 27 Mark Reynolds; 14 Ryan Roberts; 4 Rusty Ryal; 18 Chad Tracy; 29 Josh Whitesell; 16 Josh Wilson | Outfielders: 22 Eric Byrnes; 34 Conor Jackson; 16 Trent Oeltjen; 9 Gerardo Parra; 28 Alex Romero; 10 Justin Upton; 24 Chris Young | Manager: 7 A. J. Hinch; 3 Bob Melvin; Coaches: 21 Lorenzo Bundy (first base); 23 Kirk Gibson (bench); 5 Chip Hale (third base); 8 Jack Howell (hitting); 35 Bryan Price (pitching); 9 Rick Schu (hitting); 53 Glenn Sherlock (bullpen); 30 Mel Stottlemyre Jr. (pitching) |

== Player stats ==
Note: Team batting and pitching leaders in each category are in bold.

=== Batting ===
Note: G = Games played; AB = At bats; R = Runs scored; H = Hits; 2B = Doubles; 3B = Triples; HR = Home runs; RBI = Runs batted in; AVG = Batting average; SB = Stolen bases

| Player | G | AB | R | H | 2B | 3B | HR | RBI | AVG | SB |
|---|---|---|---|---|---|---|---|---|---|---|
| Brandon Allen | 32 | 104 | 13 | 21 | 7 | 0 | 4 | 14 | .202 | 0 |
| Eric Byrnes | 84 | 239 | 26 | 54 | 14 | 1 | 8 | 31 | .226 | 9 |
| Luke Carlin | 10 | 18 | 3 | 3 | 0 | 0 | 0 | 1 | .167 | 0 |
| Tony Clark | 36 | 66 | 7 | 12 | 4 | 0 | 4 | 11 | .182 | 0 |
| Stephen Drew | 135 | 533 | 71 | 139 | 29 | **12** | 12 | 65 | .261 | 5 |
| John Hester | 15 | 28 | 4 | 7 | 2 | 0 | 1 | 4 | .250 | 0 |
| Conor Jackson | 30 | 99 | 8 | 18 | 4 | 0 | 1 | 14 | .182 | 5 |
| Felipe López | 85 | 345 | 44 | 104 | 18 | 1 | 6 | 25 | .301 | 6 |
| Miguel Montero | 128 | 425 | 61 | 125 | **30** | 0 | 16 | 59 | .294 | 1 |
| Trent Oeltjen | 24 | 70 | 11 | 17 | 4 | 1 | 3 | 4 | .243 | 3 |
| Augie Ojeda | 103 | 264 | 38 | 65 | 17 | 3 | 1 | 16 | .246 | 3 |
| Gerardo Parra | 120 | 455 | 59 | 132 | 21 | 8 | 5 | 60 | .290 | 5 |
| Mark Reynolds | **155** | **578** | **98** | 150 | **30** | 1 | **44** | **102** | .260 | **24** |
| Ryan Roberts | 110 | 305 | 41 | 85 | 17 | 2 | 7 | 25 | .279 | 7 |
| Alex Romero | 66 | 145 | 14 | 36 | 6 | 2 | 1 | 18 | .248 | 2 |
| Rusty Ryal | 30 | 59 | 11 | 16 | 6 | 2 | 3 | 9 | .271 | 1 |
| Chris Snyder | 61 | 165 | 20 | 33 | 7 | 0 | 6 | 22 | .200 | 0 |
| Chad Tracy | 98 | 257 | 29 | 61 | 15 | 0 | 8 | 39 | .237 | 1 |
| Justin Upton | 138 | 526 | 84 | **158** | **30** | 7 | 26 | 86 | **.300** | 20 |
| Josh Whitesell | 46 | 108 | 7 | 21 | 7 | 0 | 1 | 14 | .194 | 0 |
| Josh Wilson | 11 | 26 | 1 | 6 | 1 | 0 | 0 | 2 | .231 | 0 |
| Chris Young | 134 | 433 | 54 | 92 | 28 | 4 | 15 | 42 | .212 | 11 |
| Pitcher totals | 162 | 317 | 16 | 53 | 10 | 1 | 1 | 23 | .167 | 0 |
| Team Totals | 162 | 5565 | 720 | 1408 | 307 | 45 | 173 | 686 | .253 | 102 |

=== Pitching ===
Note: W = Wins; L = Losses; ERA = Earned run average; G = Games pitched; GS = Games started; SV = Saves; IP = Innings pitched; R = Runs allowed; ER = Earned runs allowed; BB = Walks allowed; K = Strikeouts

| Player | W | L | ERA | G | GS | SV | IP | R | ER | BB | K |
|---|---|---|---|---|---|---|---|---|---|---|---|
| Bryan Augenstein | 0 | 1 | 7.94 | 7 | 2 | 0 | 17.0 | 16 | 15 | 6 | 6 |
| Blaine Boyer | 0 | 1 | 2.68 | 30 | 0 | 0 | 37.0 | 20 | 11 | 12 | 18 |
| Billy Buckner | 4 | 6 | 6.40 | 16 | 13 | 0 | 77.1 | 67 | 55 | 29 | 64 |
| Daniel Cabrera | 0 | 1 | 6.55 | 6 | 1 | 0 | 11.0 | 8 | 8 | 7 | 7 |
| Doug Davis | 9 | **14** | 4.12 | 34 | **34** | 0 | 203.1 | **106** | **93** | **103** | 146 |
| Jon Garland | 8 | 11 | 4.29 | 27 | 27 | 0 | 167.2 | 91 | 80 | 52 | 83 |
| Tom Gordon | 0 | 1 | 21.60 | 3 | 0 | 0 | 1.2 | 4 | 4 | 3 | 0 |
| Juan Gutierrez | 4 | 3 | 4.06 | 65 | 0 | 9 | 71.0 | 39 | 32 | 30 | 66 |
| Dan Haren | **14** | 10 | **3.14** | 33 | 33 | 0 | **229.1** | 96 | 80 | 38 | **223** |
| Bobby Korecky | 0 | 0 | 13.50 | 5 | 0 | 0 | 6.0 | 9 | 9 | 4 | 3 |
| Kevin Mulvey | 0 | 3 | 7.04 | 6 | 4 | 0 | 23.0 | 18 | 18 | 12 | 18 |
| Tony Peña | 5 | 3 | 4.24 | 37 | 0 | 1 | 34.0 | 19 | 16 | 11 | 26 |
| Yusmeiro Petit | 3 | 10 | 5.82 | 23 | 17 | 0 | 89.2 | 65 | 58 | 34 | 74 |
| Chad Qualls | 2 | 2 | 3.63 | 51 | 0 | **24** | 52.0 | 25 | 21 | 7 | 45 |
| Jon Rauch | 2 | 2 | 4.14 | **58** | 0 | 2 | 54.1 | 29 | 25 | 17 | 35 |
| Leo Rosales | 2 | 1 | 4.76 | 33 | 0 | 0 | 45.1 | 28 | 24 | 12 | 31 |
| Max Scherzer | 9 | 11 | 4.12 | 30 | 30 | 0 | 170.1 | 87 | 78 | 63 | 174 |
| Daniel Schlereth | 1 | 4 | 5.89 | 21 | 0 | 0 | 18.1 | 13 | 12 | 15 | 22 |
| Scott Schoeneweis | 1 | 2 | 7.13 | 45 | 0 | 0 | 24.0 | 21 | 19 | 13 | 14 |
| Doug Slaten | 0 | 0 | 7.11 | 11 | 0 | 0 | 6.1 | 5 | 5 | 1 | 4 |
| Esmerling Vásquez | 3 | 3 | 4.42 | 53 | 0 | 0 | 53.0 | 30 | 26 | 29 | 45 |
| Brandon Webb | 0 | 0 | 13.50 | 1 | 1 | 0 | 4.0 | 6 | 6 | 2 | 2 |
| Josh Wilson | 0 | 0 | 0.00 | 1 | 0 | 0 | 1.0 | 0 | 0 | 1 | 0 |
| Clay Zavada | 3 | 3 | 3.35 | 49 | 0 | 0 | 51.0 | 22 | 19 | 24 | 52 |
| **Team totals** | **70** | **92** | **4.42** | **162** | **162** | **36** | **1447.2** | **782** | **711** | **525** | **1158** |

== Farm system ==
| Level | Team | League | Manager |
|---|---|---|---|
| AAA | Reno Aces | Pacific Coast League | Brett Butler |
| AA | Mobile BayBears | Southern League | Héctor de la Cruz |
| A | Visalia Rawhide | California League | Mike Bell |
| A | South Bend Silver Hawks | Midwest League | Mark Haley |
| A-Short Season | Yakima Bears | Northwest League | Bob Didier |
| Rookie | Missoula Osprey | Pioneer League | Audo Vicente |
