= 2009 Major League Baseball season =

2009 MLB season
- League: Major League Baseball
- Sport: Baseball
- Duration: April 5 – November 4, 2009
- Games: 162
- Teams: 30
- TV partner(s): Fox; TBS; ESPN; MLB Network

Draft
- Top draft pick: Stephen Strasburg
- Picked by: Washington Nationals

Regular season
- Season MVP: AL: Joe Mauer (MIN); NL: Albert Pujols (STL)

Postseason
- AL champions: New York Yankees
- AL runners-up: Los Angeles Angels
- NL champions: Philadelphia Phillies
- NL runners-up: Los Angeles Dodgers

World Series
- Champions: New York Yankees
- Runners-up: Philadelphia Phillies
- World Series MVP: Hideki Matsui (NYY)

MLB seasons
- ← 2008 2010 →

Locations of AL teams for the 2009 MLB season
West Central East
Locations of NL teams for the 2009–2011 MLB seasons
West Central East

The 2009 Major League Baseball season began on April 5, 2009; the regular season was extended two days for a one-game playoff between the Detroit Tigers and the Minnesota Twins for the American League Central title. The postseason began the next day with the Division Series. The World Series began on October 28, and ended on November 4, with the New York Yankees defeating the Philadelphia Phillies in six games. This was the second time the season was completed in November. The only other occasion was the 2001 World Series, because of the delaying of the end of that season due to the September 11 attacks as November baseball would be guaranteed when Game 4 was played on Sunday, November 1. Had the 2009 World Series gone the full seven games, Game 7 would've been played on November 5, the latest date ever scheduled for a World Series game. It became the latest date for a World Series game in 2022. The American League champion had home field advantage for the World Series by virtue of winning the All-Star Game on July 14 at Busch Stadium in St. Louis, Missouri, 4–3. In addition, the annual Civil Rights Game became a regular season game, and was played June 20 at Great American Ball Park in Cincinnati, Ohio, when the host Cincinnati Reds lost to the Chicago White Sox in an interleague game, 10–8. Both teams wore replicas of their 1965 uniforms in the contest.

== Standings ==
=== American League ===
AL East
Team	W	L	Pct.	GB	Home	Road
^{(1)} New York Yankees	103	59	.636	—	57‍–‍24	46‍–‍35
^{(4)} Boston Red Sox	95	67	.586	8	56‍–‍25	39‍–‍42
Tampa Bay Rays	84	78	.519	19	52‍–‍29	32‍–‍49
Toronto Blue Jays	75	87	.463	28	44‍–‍37	31‍–‍50
Baltimore Orioles	64	98	.395	39	39‍–‍42	25‍–‍56

AL Central
Team	W	L	Pct.	GB	Home	Road
^{(3)} Minnesota Twins	87	76	.534	—	49‍–‍33	38‍–‍43
Detroit Tigers	86	77	.528	1	51‍–‍30	35‍–‍47
Chicago White Sox	79	83	.488	7½	43‍–‍38	36‍–‍45
Cleveland Indians	65	97	.401	21½	35‍–‍46	30‍–‍51
Kansas City Royals	65	97	.401	21½	33‍–‍48	32‍–‍49

AL West
Team	W	L	Pct.	GB	Home	Road
^{(2)} Los Angeles Angels	97	65	.599	—	49‍–‍32	48‍–‍33
Texas Rangers	87	75	.537	10	48‍–‍33	39‍–‍42
Seattle Mariners	85	77	.525	12	48‍–‍33	37‍–‍44
Oakland Athletics	75	87	.463	22	40‍–‍41	35‍–‍46

=== National League ===
NL East
Team	W	L	Pct.	GB	Home	Road
^{(2)} Philadelphia Phillies	93	69	.574	—	45‍–‍36	48‍–‍33
Florida Marlins	87	75	.537	6	43‍–‍38	44‍–‍37
Atlanta Braves	86	76	.531	7	40‍–‍41	46‍–‍35
New York Mets	70	92	.432	23	41‍–‍40	29‍–‍52
Washington Nationals	59	103	.364	34	33‍–‍48	26‍–‍55

NL Central
Team	W	L	Pct.	GB	Home	Road
^{(3)} St. Louis Cardinals	91	71	.562	—	46‍–‍35	45‍–‍36
Chicago Cubs	83	78	.516	7½	46‍–‍34	37‍–‍44
Milwaukee Brewers	80	82	.494	11	40‍–‍41	40‍–‍41
Cincinnati Reds	78	84	.481	13	40‍–‍41	38‍–‍43
Houston Astros	74	88	.457	17	44‍–‍37	30‍–‍51
Pittsburgh Pirates	62	99	.385	28½	40‍–‍41	22‍–‍58

NL West
Team	W	L	Pct.	GB	Home	Road
^{(1)} Los Angeles Dodgers	95	67	.586	—	50‍–‍31	45‍–‍36
^{(4)} Colorado Rockies	92	70	.568	3	51‍–‍30	41‍–‍40
San Francisco Giants	88	74	.543	7	52‍–‍29	36‍–‍45
San Diego Padres	75	87	.463	20	42‍–‍39	33‍–‍48
Arizona Diamondbacks	70	92	.432	25	36‍–‍45	34‍–‍47

- The Minnesota Twins defeated the Detroit Tigers in a one-game playoff to earn the AL Central division title.

== Postseason ==
=== Bracket ===
Division Series (ALDS, NLDS)
1	NY Yankees	3
3	Minnesota	0
American League
2	LA Angels	3
4	Boston	0
1	LA Dodgers	3
3	St. Louis	0
National League
2	Philadelphia	3
4	Colorado	1

League Championship Series (ALCS, NLCS)
1	NY Yankees	4
2	LA Angels	2
1	LA Dodgers	1
2	Philadelphia	4

World Series
AL1	NY Yankees	4
NL2	Philadelphia	2

Note: Two teams in the same division could not meet in the division series.

== League leaders ==
=== American League ===
Batting leaders
Stat	Player	Total
AVG	Joe Mauer (MIN)	.365
OPS	Joe Mauer (MIN)	1.031
HR	Carlos Peña (TB); Mark Teixeira (NYY)	39
RBI	Mark Teixeira (NYY)	122
R	Dustin Pedroia (BOS)	115
H	Ichiro Suzuki (SEA)	225
SB	Jacoby Ellsbury (BOS)	70

Pitching leaders
Stat	Player	Total
W	Justin Verlander (DET); CC Sabathia (NYY); Félix Hernández (SEA)	19
L	Jeremy Guthrie (BAL)	17
ERA	Zack Greinke (KC)	2.16
K	Justin Verlander (DET)	269
IP	Justin Verlander (DET)	240
SV	Brian Fuentes (LAA)	48
WHIP	Zack Greinke (KC)	1.073

=== National League ===
Batting leaders
Stat	Player	Total
AVG	Hanley Ramírez (FLA)	.342
OPS	Albert Pujols (STL)	1.101
HR	Albert Pujols (STL)	47
RBI	Prince Fielder (MIL); Ryan Howard (PHI)	141
R	Albert Pujols (STL)	124
H	Ryan Braun (MIL)	203
SB	Michael Bourn (HOU)	61

Pitching leaders
Stat	Player	Total
W	Adam Wainwright (STL)	19
L	Zack Duke (PIT)	16
ERA	Chris Carpenter (STL)	2.24
K	Tim Lincecum (SF)	261
IP	Adam Wainwright (STL)	233
SV	Heath Bell (SD)	42
WHIP	Dan Haren (AZ)	1.003

== Managing changes ==
=== General managers ===
The Seattle Mariners named Milwaukee Brewers scouting director Jack Zduriencik its new general manager on October 22, replacing interim GM Lee Pelekoudas.

Washington Nationals GM Jim Bowden resigned on March 1 amid allegations that he was skimming bonus money from Latin American players. Team president Stan Kasten first took over the bulk of his duties before transferring them to assistant GM Mike Rizzo, who had served as acting GM, and was named as the full-time general manager on August 20.

During the last days of the regular season, two teams fired their general managers, effective at the end of the season. On October 3, the Toronto Blue Jays fired J. P. Ricciardi after eight seasons. The following day, the San Diego Padres axed Kevin Towers, who had been the longest-tenured GM in Major League Baseball at 14 seasons.

=== Field managers ===
==== Off-season changes ====
Two teams announced new managers in the offseason:

Date	Team	New manager	Replaced	Former job
October 30, 2008	Milwaukee Brewers	Ken Macha	Dale Sveum	Macha was a former manager of the Oakland Athletics, and served as a part-time anaylist for NESN.
November 19, 2008	Seattle Mariners	Don Wakamatsu	Jim Riggleman	Wakamatsu, the first Major League Baseball manager of Asian descent, was the Athletics' bench coach.

Cito Gaston and Jerry Manuel both entered their first full season as managers of the Toronto Blue Jays and New York Mets, respectively, after taking over for managers dismissed in the middle of the 2008 season. Gaston had previously been the Blue Jays' manager from 1989 until 1997.

==== In-season changes ====
Date	Team	Former manager	Replacement	Previous Job
May 8	Arizona Diamondbacks	Bob Melvin	A. J. Hinch	Vice president of player development
May 29	Colorado Rockies	Clint Hurdle	Jim Tracy	Bench coach
July 13	Washington Nationals	Manny Acta	Jim Riggleman	Bench coach
September 20	Houston Astros	Cecil Cooper	Dave Clark	Third base coach

== Rule changes ==
On January 15, the owners of the 30 Major League Baseball clubs approved two rule changes governing the playing of postseason and one-game playoff games.

- All "postseason games and games added to the regular season to determine qualifiers for the postseason" become suspended games if they are called before nine innings are played, regardless of whether the game would otherwise qualify as an official game, or the score at the time the game is called. The game is resumed when conditions permit at the same location from the point of suspension. This rule change codifies the controversial interpretation of the official rules made by MLB commissioner Bud Selig during Game 5 of the 2008 World Series.
- Coin tosses will no longer be used to determine home-field advantage for one-game tiebreakers held to determine division champions or wild card teams. Instead, "performance-based criteria"—starting with head-to-head record between the tied clubs—will be used to determine home-field advantage. This came into play for the first time when the Detroit Tigers and the Minnesota Twins tied for the lead of the American League Central at the end of the regular season (October 4); the one-game playoff was played on October 6 at the Hubert H. Humphrey Metrodome as the Twins won the season series, 11–7. The game cannot be played on October 5 because of a scheduling conflict with the Minnesota Vikings, who hosted the Green Bay Packers on Monday Night Football that night.

== Milestones ==
=== Reached ===
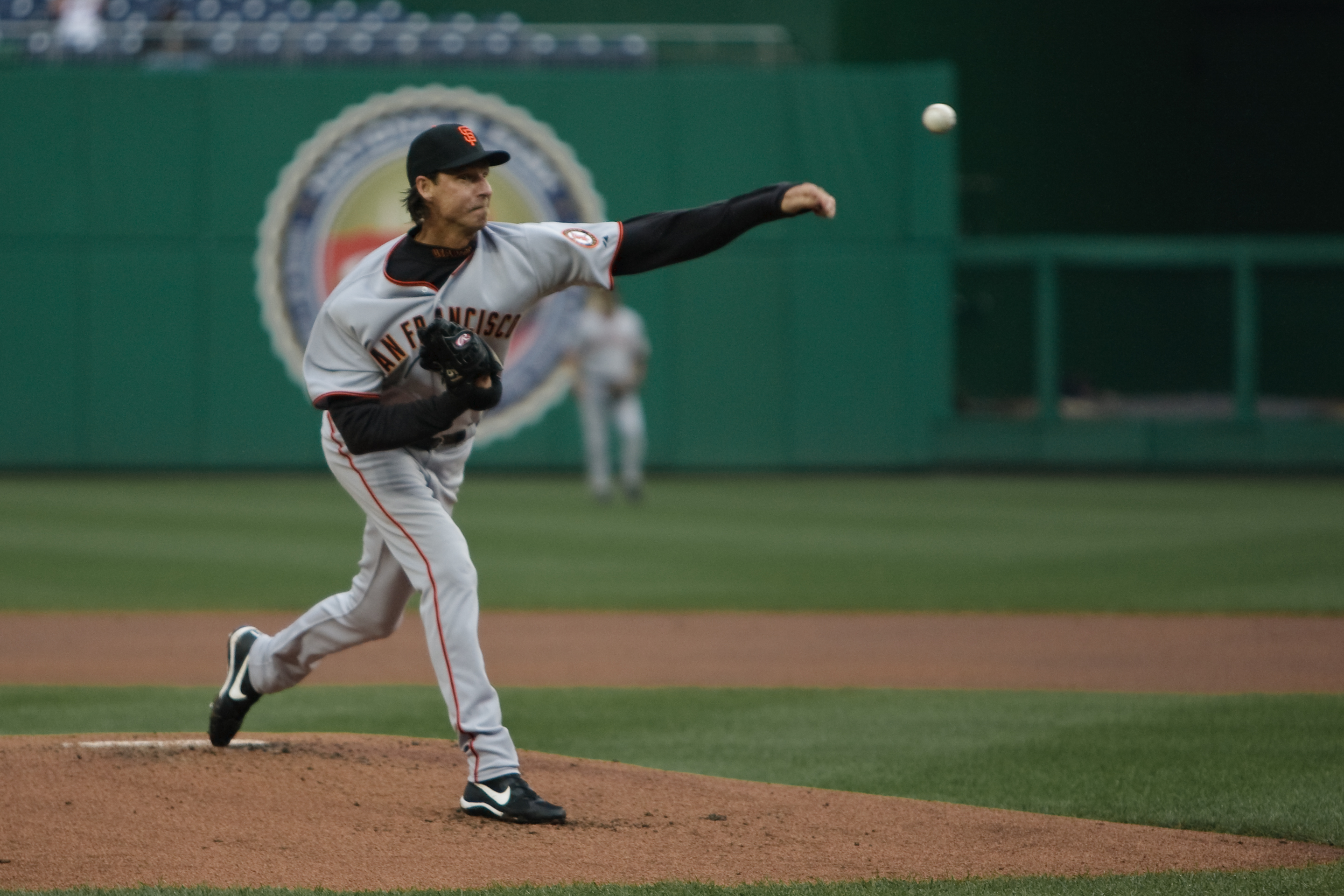
Randy Johnson's 300th career win on June 4, 2009.

- Jody Gerut, then with the San Diego Padres, became the first player to open a new ballpark with a leadoff home run, as the Padres beat the New York Mets 6–5 at Citi Field on April 13.
- Chicago White Sox teammates Jermaine Dye and Paul Konerko both hit their 300th career home runs in back-to-back plate appearances against the Detroit Tigers in the second inning at Comerica Park on April 13, the first time that historic home runs were hit consecutively.
- Gary Sheffield of the New York Mets became the 25th member of the 500 home run club on April 17 against the Milwaukee Brewers at Citi Field. The historic home run came in the bottom of the seventh inning as a pinch hitter, the first time a player has reached 500 home runs in this way.
- The Cleveland Indians set a Major League record for most runs scored in the second inning, by scoring 14 runs against the New York Yankees on April 18.
- Liván Hernández, who at the time was with the New York Mets, wins his 150th game on May 10.
- Iván Rodríguez, then of the Houston Astros, hit his 300th career home run in a game against the Chicago Cubs on May 17 at Wrigley Field. On June 17, Rodríguez played in his 2,227th game as a catcher, breaking the record for all-time games caught previously held by Carlton Fisk. He finished the season as a member of the Texas Rangers.
- Jason Kendall of the Milwaukee Brewers accomplished his 2,000th career hit in a game against the St. Louis Cardinals on May 18 at Busch Stadium.
- Todd Helton of the Colorado Rockies got his 2,000th career hit and his 500th career double (on July 22).
- Jason Giambi, then of the Oakland Athletics, recorded his 400th career home run. He finished the season as a member of the Colorado Rockies.
- Jamie Moyer of the Philadelphia Phillies notched his 250th career victory on May 31 against the Washington Nationals.
- Derek Jeter of the New York Yankees got his 2,600th hit and 1,500th run on June 2 against the Texas Rangers. The Yankees' captain would then pass Luis Aparicio for most hits by a shortstop on August 16. Jeter also became the all-time hit leader in Yankees history with a single in the third inning against the Baltimore Orioles on September 11. He broke the record of 2,721 hits that was held by Lou Gehrig.
- Randy Johnson of the San Francisco Giants became the 24th member of the 300 win club, defeating the Nationals on June 4 in the first game of a makeup doubleheader, earning the win in a 5–1 triumph. Johnson became the sixth southpaw to reach the milestone.
- Carlos Zambrano of the Chicago Cubs wins his 100th career game against the Cincinnati Reds defeating the Reds on June 5.
- Miguel Tejada and Bobby Abreu have reached 2,000 career hits as well.
- Jim Thome passed the 1,500 RBIs and the 400-double milestone as a member of the Chicago White Sox. He finished the season with the Los Angeles Dodgers.
- The Boston Red Sox celebrated their 500th consecutive sellout at Fenway Park on June 18. Sox pitcher Brad Penny also got his 100th career win.
- Cardinals manager Tony La Russa won his 2,500th game in his managerial career defeating the Kansas City Royals June 21 at Kaufmann Stadium, 12–5.
- Omar Vizquel passed Luis Aparicio for most hits by a native-born Venezuelan.
- Lance Berkman of the Houston Astros hit his 300th career home run and passed the 1,000 RBI mark.
- Kevin Millwood of the Texas Rangers wins his 150th game on June 26.
- Mariano Rivera becomes the second pitcher in MLB history to record 500 career saves on June 29 in a 4–2 victory against their crosstown rivals, the New York Mets. He also saved his major league record fourth All-Star Game.
- Albert Pujols of the St. Louis Cardinals reached the 1,000 RBI list and the 1,000-run list. On June 30 at Busch Stadium, Pujols became the 32nd player to hit 30 home runs before the All-Star break. He is also the seventh player to hit 30 home runs before the month of July. He would later become the second player in history to record at least 100 RBI in each of his first nine seasons on a 3-run double in the sixth inning at Pittsburgh on August 8, and also hit his 350th career home run after nine seasons.
- Adam Dunn hit his 300th career home run on July 3.
- Garret Anderson of the Atlanta Braves hit his 500th career double on June 27. He also got his 2,500th career hit with a single in the second inning against the Washington Nationals on October 1. He became the 90th player in major league history to reach this mark.
- David Ortiz of the Boston Red Sox reached the 300 home run plateau on July 9. He also got his 1,000th career hit as a member of the team on July 11. On September 15, Ortiz set the record for most home runs for a designated hitter by hitting his 270th against the Los Angeles Angels.
- Jonathan Sánchez of the San Francisco Giants pitched baseball's first no-hitter of the season on July 10 as he defeated the San Diego Padres, 8–0 at AT&T Park. It was the first no-hitter hurled at "The Phone Booth".
- Ted Lilly of the Chicago Cubs won his 100th game on July 11.
- Josh Beckett of the Boston Red Sox won his 100th game on July 12.
- Mark Buehrle of the Chicago White Sox pitched the 16th perfect game in baseball's modern era on July 23, beating the Tampa Bay Rays at U.S. Cellular Field, 5–0. Buehrle became the sixth pitcher to hurl both a no hitter and a perfect game in his career, joining Hall of Famers Addie Joss, Cy Young, Sandy Koufax and Jim Bunning, and also Randy Johnson. Buehrle did this in the midst of setting a Major League record by retiring 45 consecutive batters over three games.
- Josh Willingham of the Washington Nationals became the 13th player in history to hit two grand slams in one game on July 27 against the Milwaukee Brewers.
- Carlos Lee of the Houston Astros hits his 300th career home run in a game against the Milwaukee Brewers on August 8. He becomes the 125th person in major league baseball history to reach this mark.
- Vladimir Guerrero of the Los Angeles Angels hits his 400th career home run in a game against the Tampa Bay Rays on August 10. He becomes the 45th player in major league history to reach this mark. Guerrero would later single in the fifth inning against the Detroit Tigers on August 26, and by doing so, became the 13th player to get over 1,000 hits for more than one franchise.
- Also on August 10, Troy Tulowitzki hit for the cycle against the Chicago Cubs, and became the second player in baseball history to have hit for the cycle and have an unassisted triple play in their career. His unassisted triple play came on April 24, 2007, against the Atlanta Braves. John Valentin is the other player to have done both.
- Eric Bruntlett, a reserve second baseman for the Philadelphia Phillies, pulled off baseball's fifteenth unassisted triple play against the New York Mets at Citi Field on August 23, 2009. It ended a Major League Baseball game for the first time since 1927, as the Phils beat the Mets, 9–7. The only other player to turn an unassisted triple play to complete a game was Johnny Neun, who did it for the Detroit Tigers on May 31, 1927, against the Cleveland Indians. The game also featured an inside-the-park home run by Ángel Pagán, the second such game to see both an inside-the-park homer and a triple play since July 4, 1988, when the Red Sox played at Kansas City where Dwight Evans hit an inside-the-park homer and Jim Rice hit into a triple play. Bruntlett was playing second base for regular starter Chase Utley, who was given a day of rest by manager Charlie Manuel.
- John Lackey of the Los Angeles Angels won his 100th game on August 30.
- Alex Rodriguez of the New York Yankees collected his 2,500th hit with a single in the fifth inning against the Baltimore Orioles on September 2. He became the 89th player in MLB history to reach this mark. He also set a new American League record at seven, for most RBI in one inning by a single player by hitting a 3-run home run, and a grand slam later in the inning on October 4.
- Randy Wolf of the Los Angeles Dodgers won his 100th game on September 5.
- Ichiro Suzuki of the Seattle Mariners collected his 2,000th hit with a double in the first inning against the Oakland Athletics on September 6. Ichiro reached this mark in 1,402 games, which is the second fastest in history. (Al Simmons reached the mark in 1,390 games.) He then broke Willie Keeler's record of eight consecutive 200-hit seasons (1894–1901) with a single in the second inning of the nightcap of a make-up doubleheader on September 13 against the Texas Rangers.
- The Pittsburgh Pirates reached a new low in futility on September 7, losing to the Chicago Cubs, 4–2 clinching their seventeenth consecutive losing season, breaking the all-time low set by the Philadelphia Phillies between 1933 and 1948.
- Brett Tomko of the Oakland Athletics won his 100th game on September 14.
- Mark Reynolds, the third baseman of the Arizona Diamondbacks, broke his own record for most strikeouts in a season by fanning for the 205th time against the San Francisco Giants on September 22 at Chase Field. He finished the season striking out 223 times.
- A. J. Burnett of the New York Yankees won his 100th game on October 4.
- Tony La Russa passed John McGraw for second-most games managed in baseball with his 4,770th game managed (2,552–2,214–4) on October 1. La Russa gets three more games (October 4) to extend his managed games to 4,773 (2,552–2,217–4) by the end of 2009.
- Albert Pujols broke Bill Buckner's 1985 major-league record for assists by a first baseman, with his 185th on October 4.

== New stadiums ==
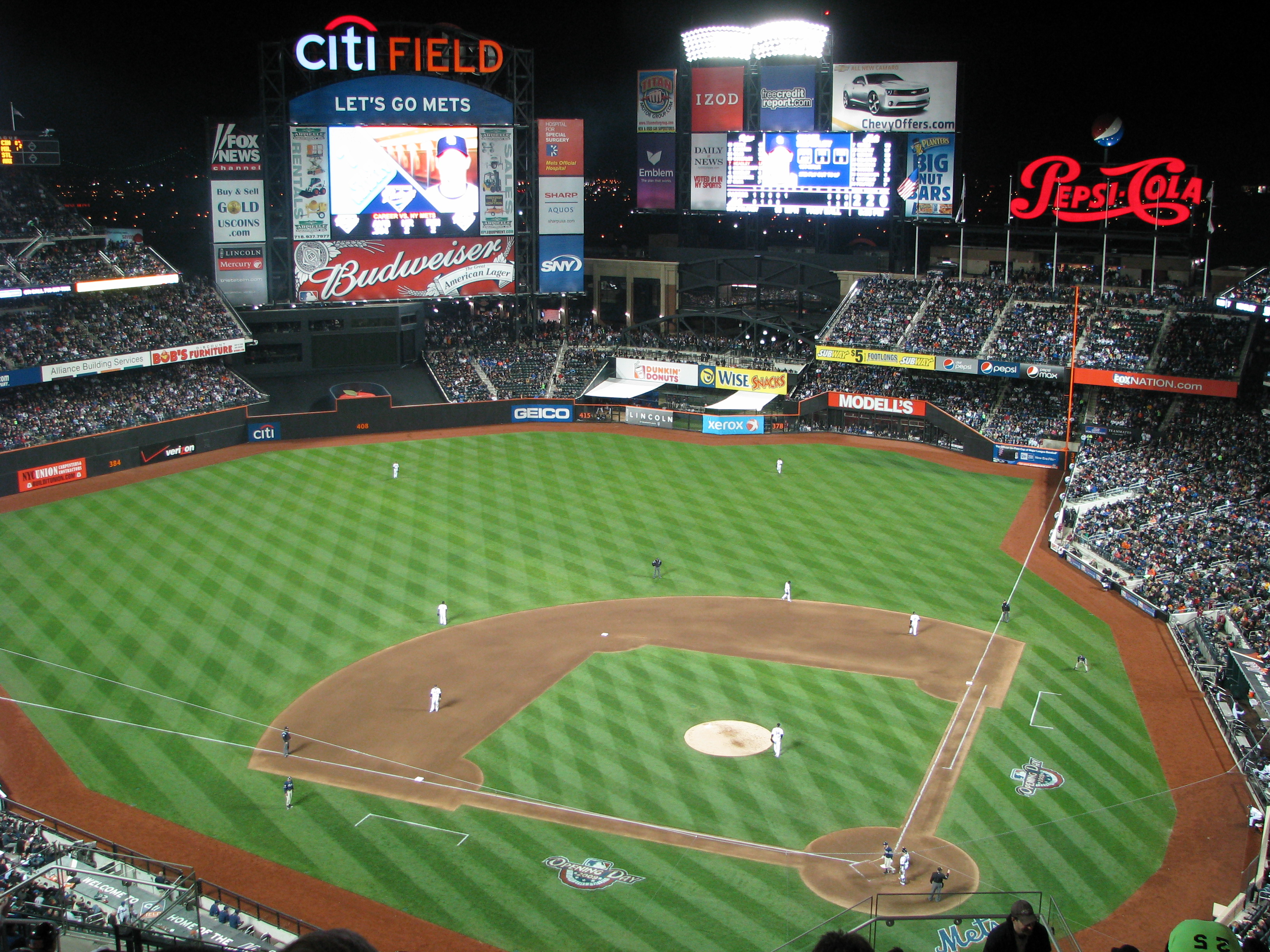
Opening Night at Citi Field on April 13, 2009

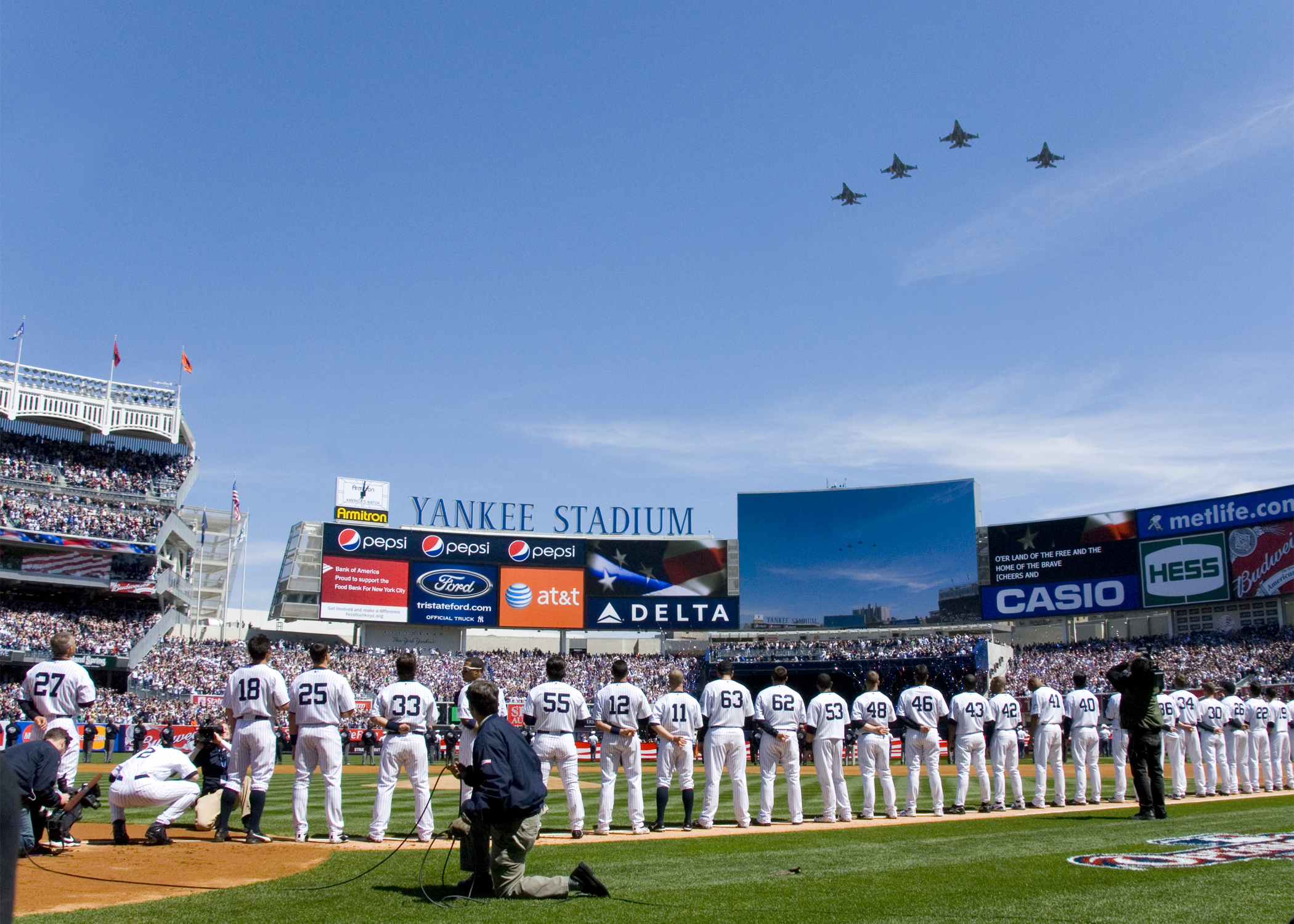
Four F-16s Fly Over the new Yankee Stadium on its Opening Day on April 16, 2009

The 2009 season marked the opening of two new stadiums, both in New York City; Citi Field for the Mets and the new Yankee Stadium for the Yankees. They respectively replaced Shea Stadium (which was dismantled during the 2008–09 offseason) and the original Yankee Stadium (which became a public park after its demolition). Because of the smaller seating capacities in these new parks, Dodger Stadium is now the largest capacity park in use with 56,000 seats, and is also the third oldest ballpark in Major League Baseball behind Fenway Park and Wrigley Field. Citi Field opened with a night game on April 13 as the Mets hosted the San Diego Padres losing 6–5. In that game, Jody Gerut of the Padres became the first player in major league history to open a new ballpark with a leadoff homer. Three days later, the Cleveland Indians inaugurated New Yankee Stadium against the Bronx Bombers. The Indians won 10–2. On Jackie Robinson Day (April 15), a rotunda at Citi Field was named in honor of Jackie Robinson and was dedicated prior to the Mets–Padres game that day.

The 2009 season also marked the final season of the Hubert H. Humphrey Metrodome as the home for the Minnesota Twins, where they had played since 1982. In 2010, the team moved to Target Field, their new baseball-only stadium located a short distance across town. Previously, since moving from Washington, D.C. in 1961, the franchise has shared, first Metropolitan Stadium, and then the Metrodome with the NFL's Minnesota Vikings; they also shared tenant rights at the Metrodome with the University of Minnesota's football team. The Golden Gophers started to play on-campus at TCF Bank Stadium in 2009. The Metrodome's last scheduled regular season game was to be played on Sunday, October 4, 2009, but the Twins tied the Detroit Tigers necessitating a one-game playoff between the two teams on October 6.

While not a new stadium, Kansas City's Kauffman Stadium completed a two-year renovation. The first year saw a new video board dubbed "Crown Vision" and refitting of several sections. Improvements for 2009 include a new glass and brick facade to the exterior of the ballpark, newly expanded team Hall of Fame, a new sports bar/restaurant, improved sightlines, new luxury suites and refurbished press and radio/TV facilities to name a few.

In late March, the Florida Marlins had their funding for a new stadium at the former site of the Miami Orange Bowl approved by Miami-Dade County commissioners. Groundbreaking ceremonies were held on July 18, with an opening by 2012, at which time the team was renamed the Miami Marlins.

== Awards ==
Baseball Writers' Association of America Awards
BBWAA Award	National League	American League
Rookie of the Year	Chris Coghlan (FLA)	Andrew Bailey (OAK)
Cy Young Award	Tim Lincecum (SF)	Zack Greinke (KC)
Manager of the Year	Jim Tracy (COL)	Mike Scioscia (LAA)
Most Valuable Player	Albert Pujols (STL)	Joe Mauer (MIN)
Gold Glove Awards
Position	National League	American League
Pitcher	Adam Wainwright (STL)	Mark Buehrle (CWS)
Catcher	Yadier Molina (STL)	Joe Mauer (MIN)
1st Base	Adrián González (SD)	Mark Teixeira (NYY)
2nd Base	Orlando Hudson (LAD)	Plácido Polanco (DET)
3rd Base	Ryan Zimmerman (WSH)	Evan Longoria (TB)
Shortstop	Jimmy Rollins (PHI)	Derek Jeter (NYY)
Outfield	Michael Bourn (HOU); Matt Kemp (LAD); Shane Victorino (PHI)	Torii Hunter (LAA); Adam Jones (BAL); Ichiro Suzuki (SEA)
Silver Slugger Awards
Position	National League	American League
Pitcher/Designated Hitter	Carlos Zambrano (CHC)	Adam Lind (TOR)
Catcher	Brian McCann (ATL)	Joe Mauer (MIN)
1st Base	Albert Pujols (STL)	Mark Teixeira (NYY)
2nd Base	Chase Utley (PHI)	Aaron Hill (TOR)
3rd Base	Ryan Zimmerman (WSH)	Evan Longoria (TB)
Shortstop	Hanley Ramírez (FLA)	Derek Jeter (NYY)
Outfield	Ryan Braun (MIL); Matt Kemp (LAD); Andre Ethier (LAD)	Torii Hunter (LAA); Ichiro Suzuki (SEA); Jason Bay (BOS)

=== Player of the Month ===
Month	American League	National League
April	Evan Longoria	Albert Pujols
May	Joe Mauer	Justin Upton
June	B. J. Upton	Albert Pujols
July	Bobby Abreu	Ryan Ludwick
August	Kendry Morales	Ryan Howard
September	Billy Butler	Derrek Lee

=== Pitcher of the Month ===
Month	American League	National League
April	Zack Greinke	Johan Santana
May	Justin Verlander	Trevor Hoffman
June	Félix Hernández	Tim Lincecum
July	Jarrod Washburn	Wandy Rodríguez
August	CC Sabathia	Chris Carpenter
September	Félix Hernández	Jair Jurrjens

=== Rookie of the Month ===
Month	American League	National League
April	Scott Richmond	Brian Barden
May	Rick Porcello	Gerardo Parra
June	Nolan Reimold	Tommy Hanson
July	Gordon Beckham	Garrett Jones
August	Andrew Bailey	Chris Coghlan
September	Brett Anderson	Casey McGehee

=== Other awards ===
- Comeback Players of the Year: Aaron Hill (TOR, American); Chris Carpenter (STL, National).
- Edgar Martínez Award (Best designated hitter): Adam Lind (TOR)
- Hank Aaron Award: Derek Jeter (NYY, American); Albert Pujols (STL, National).
- Roberto Clemente Award (Humanitarian): Derek Jeter, NYY.
- Rolaids Relief Man Award: Joe Nathan (MIN, American); Mariano Rivera (NYY, American); Heath Bell (SD, National).
- Delivery Man of the Year (Best Reliever): Mariano Rivera, NYY.
- Warren Spahn Award (Best left-handed pitcher): CC Sabathia (NYY)
- Clutch Performer of the Year: Andre Ethier, LAD.

== Home field attendance and payroll ==
Team name	Wins	%±	Home attendance	%±	Per game	Est. payroll	%±
Los Angeles Dodgers	95	13.1%	3,761,655	0.8%	46,440	$102,117,592	−13.9%
New York Yankees	103	15.7%	3,719,358	−13.5%	45,918	$210,330,039	−0.9%
Philadelphia Phillies	93	1.1%	3,600,693	5.2%	44,453	$115,479,046	18.0%
St. Louis Cardinals	91	5.8%	3,343,252	−2.6%	41,275	$90,928,409	−8.7%
Los Angeles Angels of Anaheim	97	−3.0%	3,240,386	−2.9%	40,005	$118,169,000	−0.9%
Chicago Cubs	83	−14.4%	3,168,859	−4.0%	39,611	$139,652,000	16.0%
New York Mets	70	−21.3%	3,168,571	−21.6%	39,118	$151,994,237	10.3%
Boston Red Sox	95	0.0%	3,062,699	0.5%	37,811	$125,439,499	−6.0%
Milwaukee Brewers	80	−11.1%	3,037,451	−1.0%	37,499	$81,384,502	0.6%
San Francisco Giants	88	22.2%	2,862,110	−0.1%	35,335	$91,944,450	20.0%
Colorado Rockies	92	24.3%	2,665,080	0.6%	32,902	$79,250,200	15.4%
Detroit Tigers	86	16.2%	2,567,165	−19.8%	31,693	$119,510,145	−13.9%
Houston Astros	74	−14.0%	2,521,076	−9.3%	31,124	$105,804,414	20.3%
Minnesota Twins	87	−1.1%	2,416,237	4.9%	29,466	$67,804,266	19.1%
Atlanta Braves	86	19.4%	2,373,631	−6.3%	29,304	$99,593,166	−2.7%
Chicago White Sox	79	−11.2%	2,284,163	−8.7%	28,200	$101,081,000	−16.6%
Seattle Mariners	85	39.3%	2,195,533	−5.8%	27,105	$100,134,166	−14.9%
Texas Rangers	87	10.1%	2,156,016	10.8%	26,617	$79,723,548	17.2%
Arizona Diamondbacks	70	−14.6%	2,128,765	−15.2%	26,281	$75,920,666	14.7%
San Diego Padres	75	19.0%	1,919,603	−20.9%	23,699	$50,954,200	−30.8%
Baltimore Orioles	64	−5.9%	1,907,163	−2.2%	23,545	$69,904,166	4.0%
Toronto Blue Jays	75	−12.8%	1,876,129	−21.8%	23,162	$83,964,500	−14.1%
Tampa Bay Rays	84	−13.4%	1,874,962	3.5%	23,148	$67,270,334	49.6%
Washington Nationals	59	0.0%	1,817,226	−21.7%	22,435	$64,384,000	17.1%
Kansas City Royals	65	−13.3%	1,797,891	13.9%	22,196	$76,817,333	29.2%
Cleveland Indians	65	−19.8%	1,766,242	−18.6%	21,805	$85,224,866	7.9%
Cincinnati Reds	78	5.4%	1,747,919	−15.1%	21,579	$78,979,000	6.5%
Pittsburgh Pirates	62	−7.5%	1,577,853	−1.9%	19,480	$51,912,500	6.6%
Florida Marlins	87	3.6%	1,464,109	9.7%	18,075	$40,029,000	83.5%
Oakland Athletics	75	0.0%	1,408,783	−15.4%	17,392	$65,945,000	37.5%

== Broadcasting ==
=== Television ===
This would have marked the first full season in the US for baseball games to be telecast as the transition from analog to digital television that was to have been made on February 17. However, the transition took place June 12.

A new entrant in the baseball television rights marketplace debuted on January 1 when the MLB Network, owned and operated by Major League Baseball, joined Fox, ESPN and TBS not only televising games, but also other baseball-related programming from their studio in Secaucus, New Jersey, formerly the studios of MSNBC, MLB was the last of the four major team sports to start its own television channel. The national telecast breakdown, along with the maximum number of appearances per team, is:

- Fox: Saturday afternoon Game of the Week on a regional basis; eight appearances per team. In addition, the network will broadcast the All-Star Game, ALCS and World Series. The network started their telecasts on Saturdays at 4:00 p.m. US ET/1:00 p.m. US PT, except for three dates (April 18, and May 2 and 9) to adjust for NASCAR coverage, when those programs began at 3:30 p.m. ET/12:30 p.m. PT.
- ESPN/ESPN2: Sunday Night Baseball on a weekly basis; five appearances per team. In addition, there are games on Monday and Wednesday nights (with the Monday games moving to either Wednesday nights to form a doubleheader or Friday nights when the 2009 NFL season begins), Opening Day games on April 6, and the Home Run Derby on July 13.
- TBS: Sunday afternoon games starting on April 12; 13 appearances per team. In addition, the network carried the announcement of the All-Star Teams in the National and American Leagues on July 5 as well as the Division Series and the NLCS as per the alternating contract with Fox.
- MLB Network: The network carries a weekly Thursday Night Game of the Week and Saturday Night Game of the Week. Thursday Night games were produced in-house, while Saturday Night games (except for the Civil Rights Game) usually came off the home team's video production. Blackouts applied here, as viewers in the competing team's markets were telecast an alternate game off the home team feed of selected teams.

In Canada, Toronto Blue Jays games will be televised on Rogers Sportsnet and TSN. RSN also holds the Canadian rights to air the Fox and ESPN/ESPN2 games if they do not conflict with Blue Jays games, as well as the All-Star Game and the entire postseason.

In Australia free to air channel One HD shows up to 5 games live per week, and European channel ESPN America broadcasts games as well.

=== Radio ===
ESPN Radio served as MLB's national radio network, broadcasting Sunday Night Baseball as well as selected Saturday and holiday games during the regular season, the Home Run Derby and All-Star Game, and all postseason series.

== Uniforms, patches and caps ==
=== Patches ===
As stated earlier, the Mets and Yankees wore patches commemorating the inaugural seasons of their new parks, the Twins wore patches commemorating their final season at the Metrodome, and the Cardinals, hosting the All-Star Game, wore a patch to celebrate that event.

Other teams' memorials and accomplishments on their sleeves:

- On July 4, all teams remembered the 70th anniversary of Lou Gehrig's farewell speech with a patch representing 4♦ALS charities.
- The Cleveland Indians memorialized the life of former pitcher and announcer Herb Score by wearing a patch with his number (27), a microphone and the name "HERB" on the right sleeve of all uniforms.

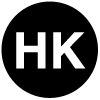
The Phillies' patch honoring Harry Kalas

- The Houston Astros wore patches commemorating the 10th season of baseball at Minute Maid Park.
- The Kansas City Royals wore patches commemorating the 40th anniversary of the founding of their team.
- The Los Angeles Angels of Anaheim added patches to all jerseys (excluding the sleeveless ones) which incorporates the words "Angels Baseball", the team logo, and 1961, the year the team was founded.
  - To honor long-time coach and scout Preston Gómez, who died in the offseason, a patch was added to the right sleeve of a black diamond with the word "Preston" on it.
  - After the death of Nick Adenhart, a rookie starting pitcher who was killed in a DUI hit-and-run following his first start of the season, a black patch with his name and number (34) was added above the left breast of the team's uniform.
- The Twins also commemorated the passing of team owner Carl Pohlad, who died on January 5 with his signature on a black oval trimmed in silver.
- The Oakland Athletics paid tribute to the Oakland Police Department—which had four of its officers killed and another injured in a shootout on March 21, 2009—with black "OPD" patches on their home uniforms.
- The Philadelphia Phillies donned a black circular patch with the letters "HK" that was added to all uniforms over the player's heart as a tribute to Harry Kalas, who died on April 13 at Nationals Park in Washington, D.C. In addition, the team wore a patch commemorating their win in the 2008 World Series until August 7 on their home uniforms.
- The San Diego Padres wore patches commemorating the 40th anniversary of the founding of their team.
- After the death of principal owner Sue Burns, the San Francisco Giants began wearing patches with the name "BURNS" on the right sleeves of their uniforms.
- The Toronto Blue Jays remembered the passing of Ted Rogers, the communications magnate and former owner of the club who died in December, with a tribute on their uniforms consisting the name "TED" on a red box. In addition, the team added a Canadian maple leaf patch on all uniforms.

=== Uniforms ===
- The Baltimore Orioles unveiled new uniforms, including the return of the city name on the road uniforms for the first time since 1972, a new patch which incorporates the Maryland state flag, and a new logo featuring a revamped version of the ornithologically correct Oriole.
- The Boston Red Sox went slightly retro, with the return of navy blue as the predominant road uniform lettering color, and the addition of an alternate hat featuring the modified "hanging socks" logo and navy blue road alternate jersey.
- The Chicago Cubs wore only a single version of their cap. They stopped wearing their road cap (which had a red bill) and wore their former home cap (all blue with a red C) for all games. This change was also reflected on the batting helmets.
- The Minnesota Twins celebrated the final season of the Metrodome by wearing a modernized retro 1982 uniform with buttons and belts instead of the pullover and knit-in belts for Saturday games and their home opener April 6 against the Mariners, and retired their navy road alternate jerseys.
- The New York Mets retired their black alternate road jersey with "NEW YORK" printed across the front. The black alternate home jersey with "Mets" printed across the front is now worn on the road as well.
- The Philadelphia Phillies wore an additional gold trim on their Opening Night game April 5, and added an alternate batting helmet for their alternate home uniforms.
- The Pittsburgh Pirates made jerseys with sleeves on their primary uniforms both home and away, and added a new black alternate with a Pirates' "P" on the left upper chest. The team has also changed their cap to place white outer trim around the "P".
- The Tampa Bay Rays added an alternate jersey in navy with light blue soutache around the placket and sleeve ends.
- The Texas Rangers dropped the team name from all uniforms in favor of their state name, and added a red alternate jersey and cap. Also, the letters and numbers on the jersey backs have been changed to match the "TEXAS" lettering on the front.
- The Washington Nationals made some minor changes to their uniforms, and now use red as their predominant color. The home and primary alternate jerseys have been modified, a new navy alternate to be worn several times a year with a stars and stripes "DC" along with a new hat, changing the front of their red alternates from "DC" (with a corresponding red cap) to the primary script "W" (worn with their regular home red cap), and the road uniform now bears a fancy script "Washington" akin to the style worn by the Senators in the 1950s and 1960s, and their old incarnation, the Montreal Expos.

==== Turn Back The Clock ====
The Pittsburgh Pirates, Detroit Tigers, Oakland Athletics and Chicago White Sox led the Majors in wearing throwback uniforms. On May 2 at Safeco Field, the Athletics and Seattle Mariners honored 1939 by wearing special uniforms. The Mariners honored the Seattle Rainiers and the Oakland Athletics honored the Oakland Oaks from that season. Both teams played in the Pacific Coast League that season. The A's then wore a 1980s styled uniform in St. Petersburg on July 11 against the Tampa Bay Rays, who wore uniforms from their inaugural season of 1998 when they were known as the "Devil Rays". Finally, On August 16, the Athletics and White Sox used vintage throwbacks. The A's wore uniforms from their Philadelphia period, with blue caps and a large A on the front of their jerseys. The White Sox wore their jerseys with a large S with a lowercase O in the top loop and a lowercase X in the bottom loop.

On June 14, the Tigers and Pirates wore throwback uniforms to commemorate the 100th anniversary of both Forbes Field and the 1909 World Series between the two teams. That game also featured a throwback atmosphere: no music or flashy graphics, no mascots (meaning no Jolly Roger or Pirate Parrot), and a hand-operated scoreboard. One modern item occurred in the pre-game: The Stanley Cup champion Pittsburgh Penguins made a surprise visit and brought the trophy with them. The Pirates and the Kansas City Royals also honored the Negro leagues on June 26 and 27 with the Pirates wearing the Homestead Grays uniforms and the Royals donning Kansas City Monarchs replicas. The Pirates and the Cincinnati Reds recreated their 1979 National League Championship Series uniforms on August 21 as part of the Buccos' 30th anniversary celebration of their World Series championship. The Bucs wore their gold pillbox hat with a gold jersey and black pants, a faux pas from the uniforms that season as a black cap was worn that year with the gold jersey.

In addition to the aforementioned Civil Rights Game and game in Oakland, the White Sox, originators of the genre of replica throwback uniforms, commemorated the fiftieth anniversary of their 1959 American League Championship on June 25 against the team that they played in that World Series, the Los Angeles Dodgers, who opted to wear their regular uniforms instead, as manager Joe Torre did not want to create hype of a World Series that was 50 years ago.

The Tigers and the Cleveland Indians played in Negro league replicas twice, with the Tigers in Detroit Stars uniforms, and the Indians outfitted in Cleveland Buckeyes replicas. In a "home-and-home" style series, the Tigers hosting the Tribe July 11 at Comerica Park, with the Tigers in 1920 Stars uniforms and the Indians in the 1948 Buckeyes road grays, while the Indians played host August 1 at Progressive Field seeing Cleveland wearing Buckeyes home whites and the Tigers in the gray Stars uniform.

- For their series against the San Francisco Giants beginning on August 14, the New York Mets wore cream-colored jerseys featuring an oversized blue "NY" on the front and a Mr. Met patch on the right sleeve. The throwback uniforms are similar to the ones the Giants wore in the early 20th century when they played at the Polo Grounds, where the Mets played their first two seasons.
- On September 5 against the Rangers, the Orioles paid homage to the Baltimore Elite Giants by wearing replicas of their uniforms from 1949.

=== Caps ===
- Once again during major American holidays and the September 11 weekend, all teams wore a cap with the cap logo in a stars and stripes motif (with the exception of the Toronto Blue Jays, whose cap logo is rendered in a maple leaf motif). The Cleveland Indians stars and stripes cap features a "C" instead of Chief Wahoo, since the Native American caricature emblazoned in stars and stripes caused some controversy when it debuted in 2008. As was the case in 2008, the proceeds from the sales of authentic caps will go to the Welcome Back Vets fund. The 2009 models are red as opposed to the navy blue caps from the previous season.
- For the home opener for the Pirates vs the Astros, the Pirates wore the caps of the Pittsburgh Police Department (PPD) which had lost three officers and had two injured in a shootout on April 4, 2009. The Astros had them on before the game.

== See also ==
- 2009 Korea Professional Baseball season
- 2009 Nippon Professional Baseball season
