= John Hester (baseball) =

American baseball player (born 1983)

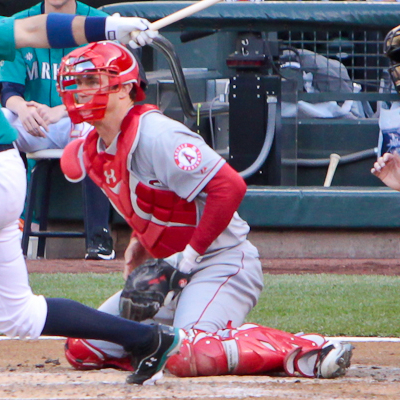
- Hester with the Los Angeles Angels of Anaheim
- Catcher
- Born: September 14, 1983 (age 42); Atlanta, Georgia, U.S.
- Batted: Right Threw: Right

MLB debut
- August 28, 2009, for the Arizona Diamondbacks

Last MLB appearance
- September 16, 2013, for the Los Angeles Angels of Anaheim

MLB statistics
- Batting average: .216
- Home runs: 6
- Runs batted in: 15
- Stats at Baseball Reference

Teams
- Arizona Diamondbacks (2009–2010); Los Angeles Angels of Anaheim (2012–2013)

John Graves Hester (born September 14, 1983) is an American former professional baseball catcher. He played in Major League Baseball (MLB) for the Arizona Diamondbacks and the Los Angeles Angels of Anaheim. On August 28, 2009, on his major league debut, he hit a two-run homer in his first Major League at-bat in a game against the Houston Astros.

== Education career ==
He attended Marist School in Atlanta before attending Stanford University. Hester graduated from Stanford in the spring of 2006.

== Major League career ==
=== Arizona Diamondbacks ===
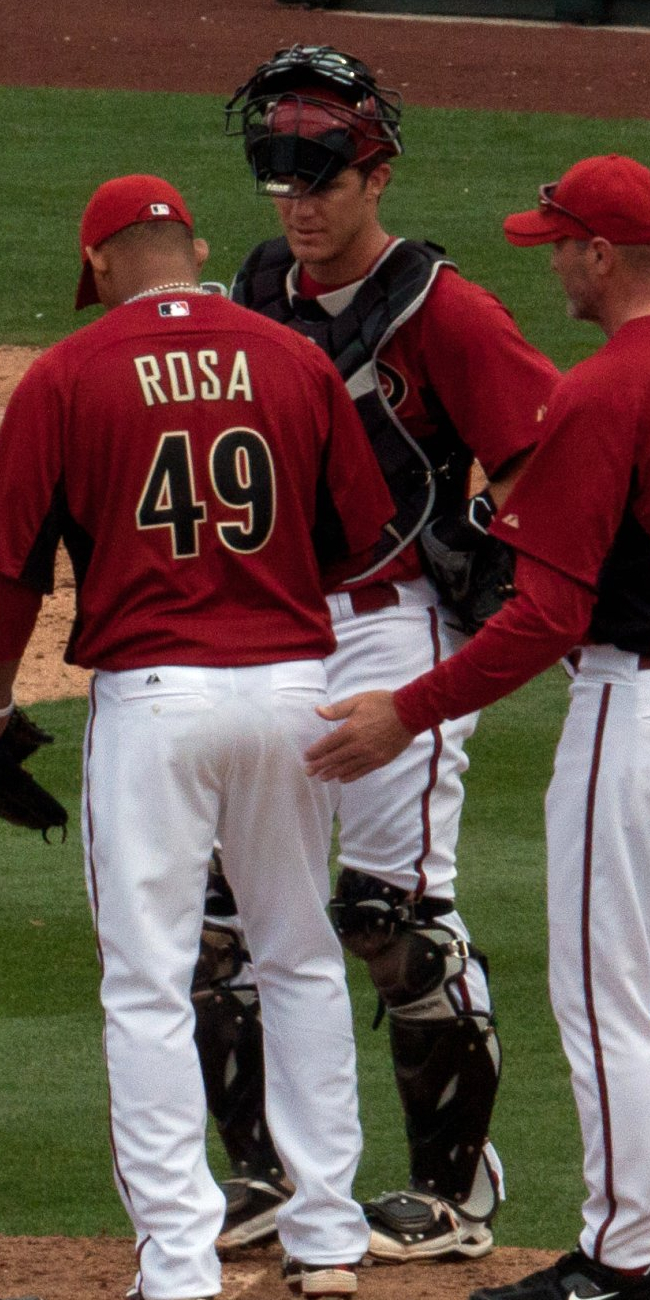
Hester during his tenure with the Arizona Diamondbacks in 2011 spring training.

Hester was selected by the Boston Red Sox in the 34th round of the 2005 MLB draft but did not sign a professional contract. Later he was selected by the Arizona Diamondbacks in the 13th round (387th overall) of the 2006 MLB draft.

He was called up to the majors on August 28, 2009, from Triple A Reno Aces after catcher Chris Snyder injured his back and was forced to the disabled list. The same night, Hester hit a two-run homer in first career Major League at-bat in the sixth inning of the game against the Houston Astros off Astros Wilton López after a 2-2 delivery from López.

=== Baltimore Orioles ===
Hester was sent to the Baltimore Orioles on April 30, 2011, to complete a previous trade from December 6, 2010, when the ballclub acquired Mark Reynolds.

=== Los Angeles Angels of Anaheim ===
On April 24, 2012, the Los Angeles Angels of Anaheim signed Hester and assigned him to the Triple-A Salt Lake Bees, according to MLB.com.

After playing 39 games for the Angels in 2012, Hester returned to Salt Lake in 2013. He elected free agency in October 2014.

=== Philadelphia Phillies ===
On October 22 he signed a minor league contract with the Philadelphia Phillies, which includes an invitation to major league spring training. He was released on June 3, 2015.

== See also ==
- List of players with a home run in first major league at-bat
