= Clay Zavada =

American baseball player (born 1984)

- Relief pitcher
- Born: June 28, 1984 (age 40); Streator, Illinois, U.S.
- Batted: Left Threw: Left

MLB debut
- May 21, 2009, for the Arizona Diamondbacks

Last appearance
- October 2, 2009, for the Arizona Diamondbacks

MLB statistics
- Win–loss record: 3–3
- Earned run average: 3.35
- Strikeouts: 52
- Stats at Baseball Reference

Teams
- Arizona Diamondbacks (2009)

Clay Pflibson Zavada (born June 28, 1984) is a former professional baseball pitcher who pitched in Major League Baseball for the Arizona Diamondbacks in 2009. He is noted for his Rollie Fingers moustache.

== Early career ==
Zavada attended Illinois Valley Community College and then transferred to Southern Illinois University Edwardsville. Playing with the Mobile BayBears in the spring before his debut, Zavada struck out 18 in 17 and 1/3 innings with an ERA of 2.60, limiting batters to a .169 average.

=== Arizona Diamondbacks ===
Clay Zavada was originally drafted to the Arizona Diamondbacks in the 30th round of 2006 out of Southern Illinois University Edwardsville. Zavada left baseball after the death of his father in the winter following his first pro season. Upon receiving his business degree, he returned to play baseball for the Southern Illinois Miners, an independent team.

Zavada was called up to the Diamondbacks for the first time on May 13, but was returned to Double-A baseball Mobile BayBears the next day to make room for debut starter Bryan Augenstein. He was recalled on May 21, and made his Major League debut the next day. In his MLB debut, Clay entered the game in relief of starter Max Scherzer and threw a perfect seventh inning, defeating his rookie opponent Christian Martinez, who was also making his major league debut for the Florida Marlins.

After failing to make the team in 2010 and struggling in AAA, Zavada had Tommy John surgery and missed the entire 2010 season. He pitched in the minor leagues from 2011 to 2013, but did not return to the Major Leagues.

=== Gary SouthShore RailCats ===
In 2013, Zavada played for the Gary SouthShore RailCats of the American Association of Independent Professional Baseball.
