= Billy Buckner =

American baseball player (born 1983)

- Pitcher
- Born: August 27, 1983 (age 42); Decatur, Georgia, U.S.
- Batted: Right Threw: Right

MLB debut
- August 25, 2007, for the Kansas City Royals

Last MLB appearance
- May 24, 2014, for the San Diego Padres

MLB statistics
- Win–loss record: 7–12
- Earned run average: 6.02
- Strikeouts: 114
- Stats at Baseball Reference

Teams
- Kansas City Royals (2007); Arizona Diamondbacks (2008–2010); Los Angeles Angels of Anaheim (2013); San Diego Padres (2014)

William Jennings Buckner (born August 27, 1983) is an American former professional baseball pitcher, who played in Major League Baseball (MLB) for the Kansas City Royals, Arizona Diamondbacks, Los Angeles Angels of Anaheim, and San Diego Padres.

== Baseball career ==
=== Kansas City Royals ===
Buckner was originally drafted in the 9th round (248th overall) by the Tampa Bay Devil Rays in the 2003 Major League Baseball draft out of Young Harris College, but chose not to sign and instead played college baseball at the University of South Carolina. He was drafted again in 2004 by the Kansas City Royals in the second round as the 55th overall pick.

In his fourth season in the Royals organization, Buckner was called up to the big league club on August 24, 2007.

=== Arizona Diamondbacks ===
On December 14, 2007, Buckner was traded to the Arizona Diamondbacks for infielder Alberto Callaspo.

=== Detroit Tigers ===
On June 1, 2010, Buckner was traded to the Detroit Tigers in exchange for Dontrelle Willis and cash considerations. He was released by Detroit on July 25.

=== Colorado Rockies ===
On December 20, 2010, Buckner was signed by the Colorado Rockies to a minor league deal with an invite to spring training. Buckner had hoped to compete for a spot on the roster, but spent the entire season in Triple-A with the Colorado Springs Sky Sox where he was 4–8 with a 6.03 ERA in 23 appearances. He was traded for a player to be named later however the Rockies never bothered to claim the other player.

=== Boston Red Sox ===
On March 2, 2012, Buckner signed a minor league deal with the Boston Red Sox with an invitation to their minor league camp. He was expected to compete for a starting pitching role in their system. Buckner began the season with the Double-A Portland Sea Dogs. He was called up to the Triple-A Pawtucket Red Sox but never reached the major league club. He elected free agency at the end of the season, in which he had a 3.65 ERA in 27 starts.

=== Los Angeles Angels of Anaheim ===
On November 14, 2012, Buckner signed a minor league contract with the Los Angeles Angels organization. Buckner was called up to the Angels on May 16, 2013, and made his first start since 2010 on May 25. He was designated for assignment the next day, following Kevin Jepsen's activation from the disabled list. Buckner cleared waivers and was sent outright to the Triple-A Salt Lake Bees on May 28. On June 21, the Angels selected Buckner's contract, adding him back to their active roster. In seven total appearances for Los Angeles, he posted a 1-0 record and 4.67 ERA with seven strikeouts across 17 1/3 innings pitched. Buckner was designated for assignment following the acquisition of J. C. Gutiérrez on July 25. He cleared waivers and was sent outright to July 28. Buckner was added back to the team's active roster on August 21, but was designated for assignment a third time without making an appearance two days later. He cleared waivers and was once again sent outright to Salt Lake on August 25.

=== San Diego Padres ===
On April 21, 2014, the San Diego Padres signed Buckner to a minor league contract. On May 24, the Padres selected his contract from the Triple-A El Paso Chihuahuas to make a start against the Chicago Cubs that night. He was designated for assignment the next day, and sent outright back to El Paso on May 27. Buckner was released by the Padres organization on August 3.

=== Milwaukee Brewers ===
Buckner signed a minor league contract with the Milwaukee Brewers on August 16, 2014. He made four appearances (two starts) for the Triple-A Nashville Sounds, logging a 1-1 record and 6.00 ERA with 15 strikeouts over 12 innings of work.

=== Long Island Ducks ===
On May 19, 2015, Buckner signed with the Long Island Ducks of the Atlantic League of Professional Baseball. He made 18 appearances (11 starts) for Long Island, compiling an 8-3 record and 4.00 ERA with 73 strikeouts and one save across 69 2/3 innings pitched. Buckner became a free agent after the season.

=== Arizona Diamondbacks (second stint) ===
On May 9, 2016, Buckner signed a minor league contract with the Arizona Diamondbacks organization. He made 20 appearances (15 starts) split between the Double–A Mobile BayBears and Triple–A Reno Aces, posting an aggregate 5–8 record and 4.00 ERA with 87 strikeouts across 96 2/3 innings pitched. Buckner elected free agency following the season on November 7.
