= Chad Qualls =

American baseball player (born 1978)

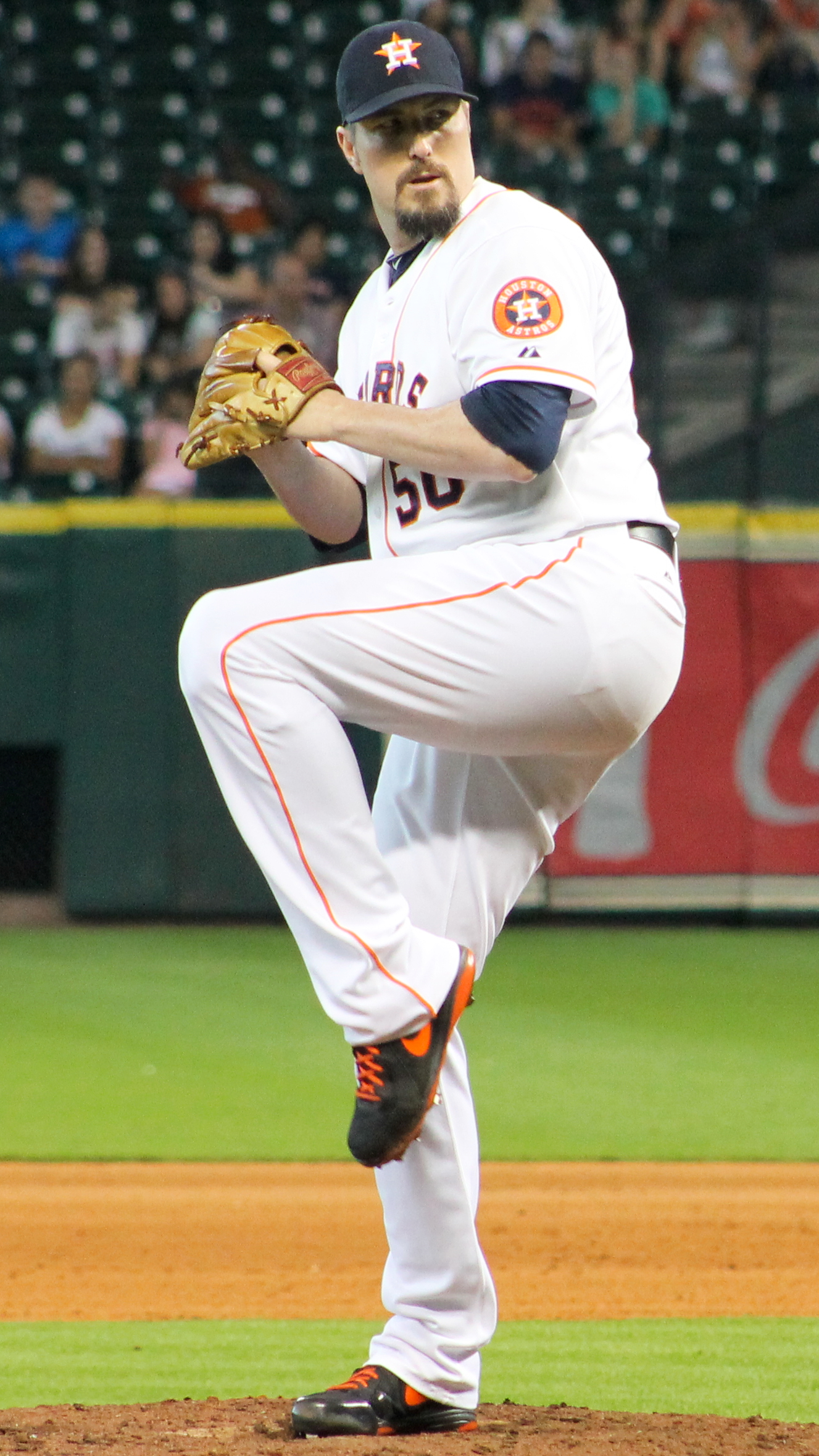
- Qualls with the Houston Astros in 2014
- Pitcher
- Born: August 17, 1978 (age 48); Lomita, California, U.S.
- Batted: Right Threw: Right

MLB debut
- July 22, 2004, for the Houston Astros

Last MLB appearance
- June 27, 2017, for the Colorado Rockies

MLB statistics
- Win–loss record: 52–48
- Earned run average: 3.89
- Strikeouts: 624
- Saves: 74
- Stats at Baseball Reference

Teams
- Houston Astros (2004–2007); Arizona Diamondbacks (2008–2010); Tampa Bay Rays (2010); San Diego Padres (2011); Philadelphia Phillies (2012); New York Yankees (2012); Pittsburgh Pirates (2012); Miami Marlins (2013); Houston Astros (2014–2015); Colorado Rockies (2016–2017)

Chad Michael Qualls (born August 17, 1978) is an American former professional baseball pitcher. He played in Major League Baseball (MLB) for the Houston Astros, Arizona Diamondbacks, Tampa Bay Rays, San Diego Padres, Philadelphia Phillies, New York Yankees, Pittsburgh Pirates, Miami Marlins, and Colorado Rockies.

== Baseball career ==
=== Amateur career ===
Qualls attended Narbonne High School in Harbor City, California, Los Angeles Harbor College (LAHC) in Wilmington, California, and the University of Nevada-Reno in Reno, Nevada.

After pitching for LAHC, he was drafted by the Toronto Blue Jays, in the 52nd round of the 1997 MLB draft, although did not sign. He transferred to the University of Nevada, where he played college baseball for the Nevada Wolf Pack's baseball team, competing in the Big West Conference of the National Collegiate Athletic Association's Division I. He was named to the Big West Conference's second team in 1999.

In 2000, Qualls anchored the Wolf Pack's starting rotation with Darrell Rasner and Matt Rainer. Qualls pitched seven complete games for the Wolf Pack.

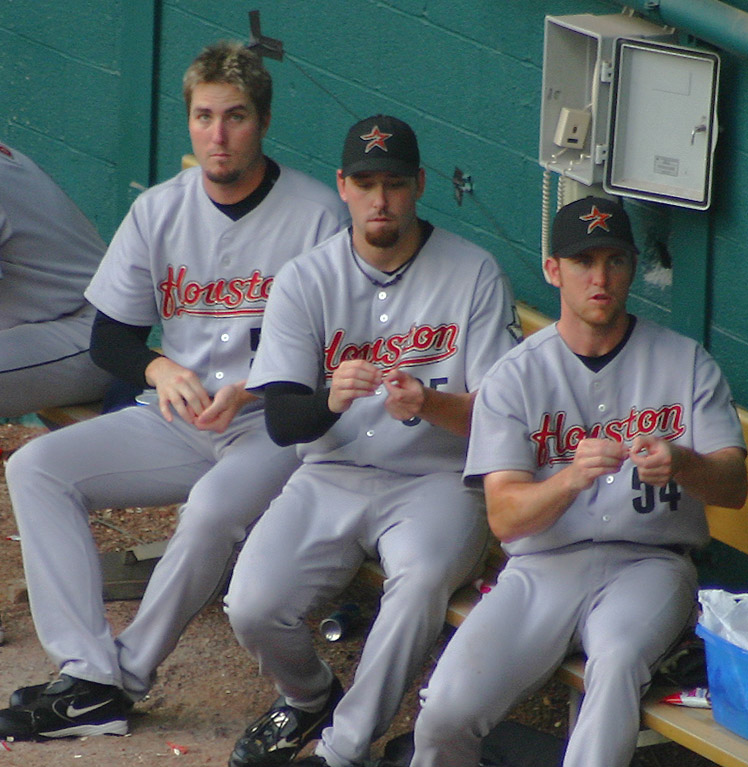
Qualls (left) with Dan Wheeler and Brad Lidge

=== Houston Astros ===
Qualls was drafted in the second round of the 2000 Major League Baseball draft by the Houston Astros. He began his career as a starting pitcher with the Michigan Battle Cats of the Class A Midwest League during the 2001 season. In 2002 and 2003, he pitched for the Round Rock Express, which competed in the Class AA Texas League. He was converted to relief during the 2004 season while with the New Orleans Zephyrs of the Class AAA Pacific Coast League.

Qualls made his major league debut with Astros on July 22, 2004. He pitched the next three seasons for the Astros. He recorded six saves and a 3.39 earned run average (ERA). Qualls joined with Dan Wheeler and Brad Lidge to form a strong bullpen, as the Astros reached the 2005 World Series. Paul Konerko of the Chicago White Sox hit a grand slam in Game 2 of that World Series off of Qualls. Qualls served a three-game suspension for throwing a baseball into the stands.

=== Arizona Diamondbacks ===
On December 14, 2007, the Astros traded Qualls to the Arizona Diamondbacks, along with Chris Burke and Juan Gutiérrez, for José Valverde. Qualls replaced Brandon Lyon as the closer for the Diamondbacks in mid-September 2008 after Lyon struggled in the second half of the season. He became one of four pitchers who pitched in at least 70 games every season from 2004 through 2008.

Qualls signed a $2.54 million contract with the Diamondbacks for the 2009 season. He became their closer at the start of the 2009 season. For the year, he recorded a 2–2 win–loss record, a 3.63 ERA, and 24 saves in 29 opportunities. On August 30, 2009, he suffered a patellar dislocation on the final play of a winning effort against the Astros. He required surgery and missed the rest of the season.

Qualls signed a one-year contract with the Diamondbacks for the 2010 season worth $4.185 million. However, he struggled with the Diamondbacks that season, pitching to an 8.29 ERA with 12 saves.

=== Tampa Bay Rays ===
On July 31, 2010, Qualls was traded to the Tampa Bay Rays for a player to be named later. He pitched in 27 games for them with a 5.57 ERA.

=== San Diego Padres ===
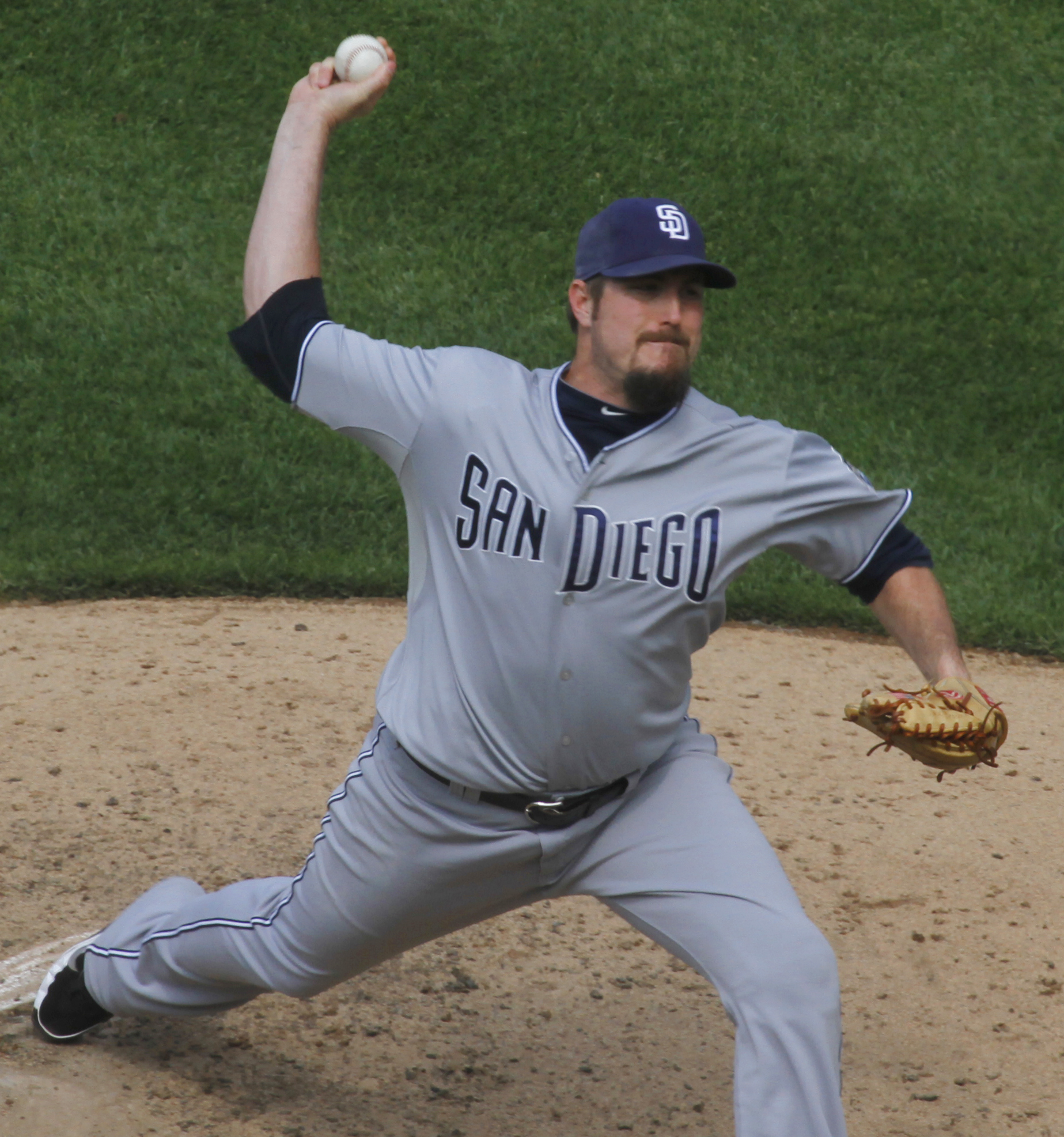
Qualls in 2011

Qualls signed with the Padres for the 2011 season and a $6 million team option for 2012. He finished the 2011 season with a 6–8 record and 3.51 ERA in a team-high 77 appearances.

=== Philadelphia Phillies ===
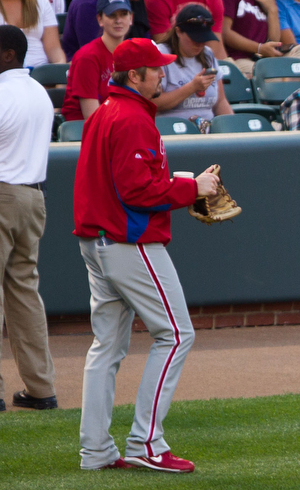
Qualls with the Phillies in 2012

Qualls signed a $1.15 million, one-year contract with the Philadelphia Phillies on January 31, 2012. On April 4, he was named to the opening day roster. He began the year as the primary set-up reliever to closer Jonathan Papelbon. With the Phillies, Qualls pitched to a 4.60 ERA in 35 games.

=== New York Yankees ===
On July 1, 2012, Qualls was traded to the New York Yankees from the Phillies for a player to be named or cash. He replaced the struggling Cory Wade in the bullpen, as Wade was demoted to the minor leagues.

=== Pittsburgh Pirates ===
On July 31, 2012, Qualls was traded from the Yankees to the Pittsburgh Pirates for Casey McGehee.

=== Miami Marlins ===
On Friday, January 25, 2013, Chad Qualls reportedly agreed to a minor league deal with the Miami Marlins.

Following a game on Tuesday, July 30, 2013, between the Marlins and Mets, Qualls became an overnight social media viral sensation. Qualls punctuated his scoreless 7th inning stint in which he walked one, allowed one hit, and struck out two, with an attempted fist pump as he ran towards the dugout. Leaving the mound after strike-three against the Mets' Omar Quintanilla, Qualls punched the air in celebration as he headed toward the dugout. As he threw the punch, he snagged his right cleat in the grass and his own forward momentum sent him tumbling to the ground. Qualls was uninjured and bounced up quickly and continued to the dugout, where he covered his face in a towel and laughed with teammates. "As soon as I saw the fist pump I put my head down," Marlins manager Mike Redmond said. "That's one of those if you win that game, you can watch it. But since we lost it's not quite as funny."

The video quickly made the rounds via Twitter and other social media and made the front page of web sites including CBS Sports, Deadspin, SI, and The Big Lead.

=== Second stint with Astros ===
On December 7, 2013, Qualls signed a two-year contract, with an option for 2016, to return to the Houston Astros. His return to the team marked the first time an Astro played two separate stints as both a National and an American League franchise. On November 3, 2015, the Astros declined their 2016 option on Qualls, making him a free agent. He was the last member of the 2005 World Series team to play for the Astros (or any other team for that matter).

=== Colorado Rockies ===
On December 8, 2015, Qualls signed a two-year, $6 million contract with the Colorado Rockies. When he joined the Rockies he became the first (and so far only) player to play for all four of the 1990s expansion teams (the Rockies, Marlins, Diamondbacks, and Rays). He was designated for assignment on June 30, 2017, and released five days later.

== Pitching style ==
Qualls throws two main pitches: a heavy sinker in the low-to-mid 90s, and a hard slider in the mid-to-upper 80s. He typically uses the sinker to get ahead in the count and the slider to get strikeouts. He also occasionally uses a changeup against left-handed hitters.
