= Mark Reynolds (baseball) =

American baseball player (born 1983)

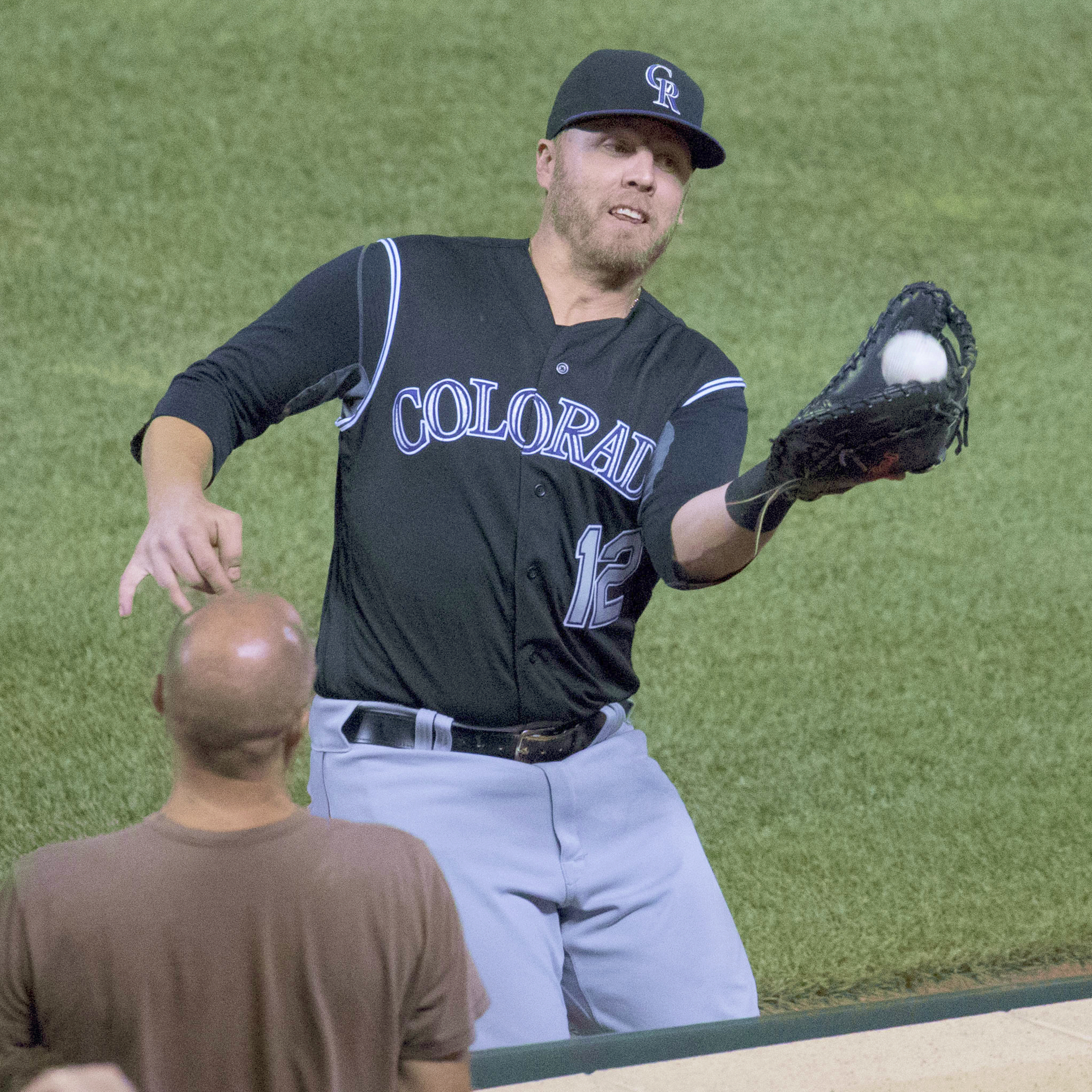
- Reynolds with the Colorado Rockies in 2016
- Third baseman / First baseman
- Born: August 3, 1983 (age 43); Pikeville, Kentucky, U.S.
- Batted: Right Threw: Right

MLB debut
- May 16, 2007, for the Arizona Diamondbacks

Last MLB appearance
- July 19, 2019, for the Colorado Rockies

MLB statistics
- Batting average: .236
- Home runs: 298
- Runs batted in: 871
- Stats at Baseball Reference

Teams
- Arizona Diamondbacks (2007–2010); Baltimore Orioles (2011–2012); Cleveland Indians (2013); New York Yankees (2013); Milwaukee Brewers (2014); St. Louis Cardinals (2015); Colorado Rockies (2016–2017); Washington Nationals (2018); Colorado Rockies (2019)

Mark Andrew Reynolds (born August 3, 1983) is an American former professional baseball third baseman and first baseman. He played in Major League Baseball (MLB) for the Arizona Diamondbacks, Baltimore Orioles, Cleveland Indians, New York Yankees, Milwaukee Brewers, St. Louis Cardinals, Washington Nationals, and two stints with the Colorado Rockies. A right-hander both when batting and throwing, Reynolds was known for his frequent and long home runs, high strikeout totals, and defensive versatility, having been primarily a third baseman before transitioning to first base while playing for the Orioles.

The Diamondbacks drafted Reynolds in the 16th round of the 2004 MLB draft from the Cavaliers of the University of Virginia, with whom he played mainly shortstop. In the minor leagues, he played second base, third base, shortstop, and left field. He broke out in 2006 with Lancaster and Tennessee, batting .318 with 31 home runs and 98 runs batted in (RBIs) in 106 games. With the Diamondbacks in 2009, he established career highs in home runs (44), RBIs (102), stolen bases (24), and runs scored (98).

Between 2009 and 2011, he finished with top ten home run totals and at bats per home run rates. In 2009, he set the all-time record for most strikeouts among batters in a season (223) which stood until Colson Montgomery broke it in 2026.

== Early life ==
Mark Andrew Reynolds was born on August 3, 1983, in Pikeville, Kentucky. Reynolds later moved with his family to Virginia Beach, Virginia. In 1994 he played for the Virginia Blasters Amateur Athletic Union (AAU) baseball program, where one of his teammates was B. J. Upton. Both would eventually join B. J.'s younger brother Justin, David Wright and Ryan Zimmerman on a Hampton Roads-based autumn showcase team called the Mets in 2000. The five players, who were all shortstops at the time, rotated among the three positions on the left side and middle of the infield. While with the Mets, Reynolds was nicknamed "Skeletor" due to his lanky build and "Forrest Gump" because of his awkward running style.

Reynolds was a four-year letterman in baseball, basketball and golf at First Colonial High School, where he graduated in 2001.

== College career ==
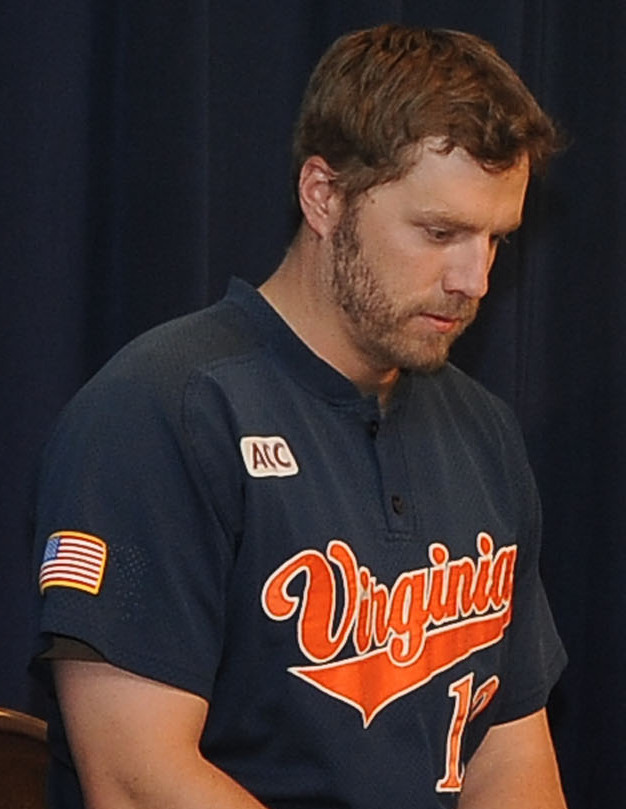
Reynolds wearing a Virginia Cavaliers baseball jersey in 2013

In his three years at the University of Virginia, he was the starting shortstop on the Cavaliers baseball team. During his sophomore and junior campaigns, he played alongside Zimmerman, who had been shifted to third base. Reynolds led the team in home runs (15) in 2002, runs batted in (46) in 2003 and triples (5) in 2004. His 60 runs scored in 2004 matched a school record which has since been broken. His 35 career home runs at Virginia is tied for second all-time in Cavaliers history. Through August 2011, he was one of 29 former UVA players to have made it to the major leagues, along with former Cavaliers Michael Schwimer, Javier López, and Zimmerman.

In 2002, he played collegiate summer baseball in the Cape Cod Baseball League for the Yarmouth-Dennis Red Sox, and returned to the league in 2003 to play for the Harwich Mariners.

== Professional career ==
=== Draft and minor leagues ===
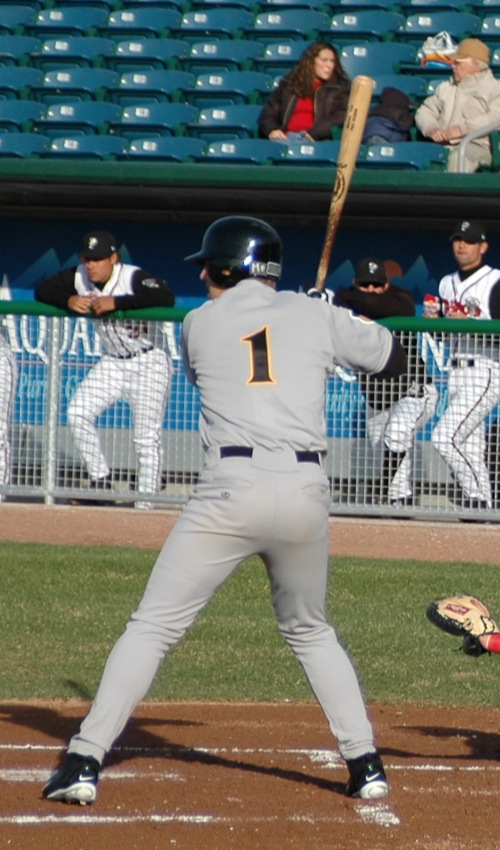
Reynolds in the Midwest League, batting for the South Bend Silver Hawks, the Class A affiliate of the Arizona Diamondbacks, in 2005.

The Arizona Diamondbacks selected Reynolds in the 16th round (476th overall) of the 2004 Major League Baseball draft. During the 2004 season, he played 64 games with the Yakima Bears of the Class A-Short Season Northwest League and four games each with the South Bend Silver Hawks of the Class A Midwest League and the Lancaster JetHawks of the Class A-Advanced California League, with an overall batting average for the season of .253 with 12 home runs and 42 runs batted in (RBIs).

Reynolds spent the 2005 season with South Bend, again hitting .253, with 19 home runs and 76 RBIs. He played 76 games for Lancaster in 2006, batting .337. hitting 23 home runs, and driving in 77 runs, and was promoted to play for the Tennessee Smokies of the Class AA Southern League, appearing in 30 games for the Smokies and batting .272 with eight home runs and 21 RBIs. He began 2007 with the Diamondbacks′ new Class AA affiliate, the Mobile BayBears of the Southern League, and hit .306 for them in 37 games, with six home runs and 22 RBIs.

=== Arizona Diamondbacks (2007–2010) ===
==== 2007 season ====
Reynolds made his major league debut on May 16, 2007, against the Colorado Rockies. He had been called up from Double-A Mobile when Chad Tracy was placed on the disabled list. Reynolds made an instant impact with the Diamondbacks, driving in 14 runs in his first 15 MLB games. Reynolds ended the season third among National League rookies in strikeouts (129), fourth in runs (62), tied for fourth in triples (4), and tied for sixth in home runs (17). He also drove in 62 runs and had a .279 batting average.

On October 3, 2007, when Arizona faced the Chicago Cubs in the first game of the 2007 National League Division Series, Reynolds' seventh-inning home run off of Cubs reliever Carlos Mármol led the Diamondbacks to a 3–1 victory and a three-game sweep of the division series. Reynolds also hit a home run in Game 3 of the 2007 National League Championship Series (NLCS). The Diamondbacks lost the league championship series to the Rockies in four games.

==== 2008 season ====
On September 25, Reynolds set a major league record by striking out for the 200th time in one season when he failed to check his swing against St. Louis Cardinals pitcher Joel Piñeiro. He broke the record of 199 set in 2007 by Philadelphia Phillies first baseman Ryan Howard. Reynolds ultimately finished the season striking out 204 times. He also led the majors in strikeout percentage, with 33.3%.

Reynolds made the most errors (34) and had the lowest fielding percentage (.904) of all major league third basemen.

He did have a good offensive year, leading the team in home runs (28) and RBIs (97) to go along with 11 stolen bases and 87 runs scored. His batting average saw a significant dip from his rookie campaign, however, ending with a .239 clip.

==== 2009 season ====
In 2009. Reynolds was named one of the five finalists for the National League Final Vote for the All-Star Game. He finished third behind Shane Victorino and Pablo Sandoval.

On July 28, Reynolds hit a two-run home run off of Philadelphia Phillies closer Brad Lidge landing at 481 feet, making it the longest home run of the 2009 season, and the second-longest home run in the history of Chase Field. He quickly became recognized for hitting towering home runs (25 of his 44 home runs being over 400 feet), averaging his home runs at 430 feet (longest in baseball).

In the Diamondbacks' four-game series against the Mets on July 29 – August 3, Reynolds managed to hit the longest home run in the short history of Citi Field, at 461 feet, as well as capped off the series finale with home runs in consecutive innings (first and second). His four home runs at Citi Field rank second all-time in home runs hit at the park by a visiting player.

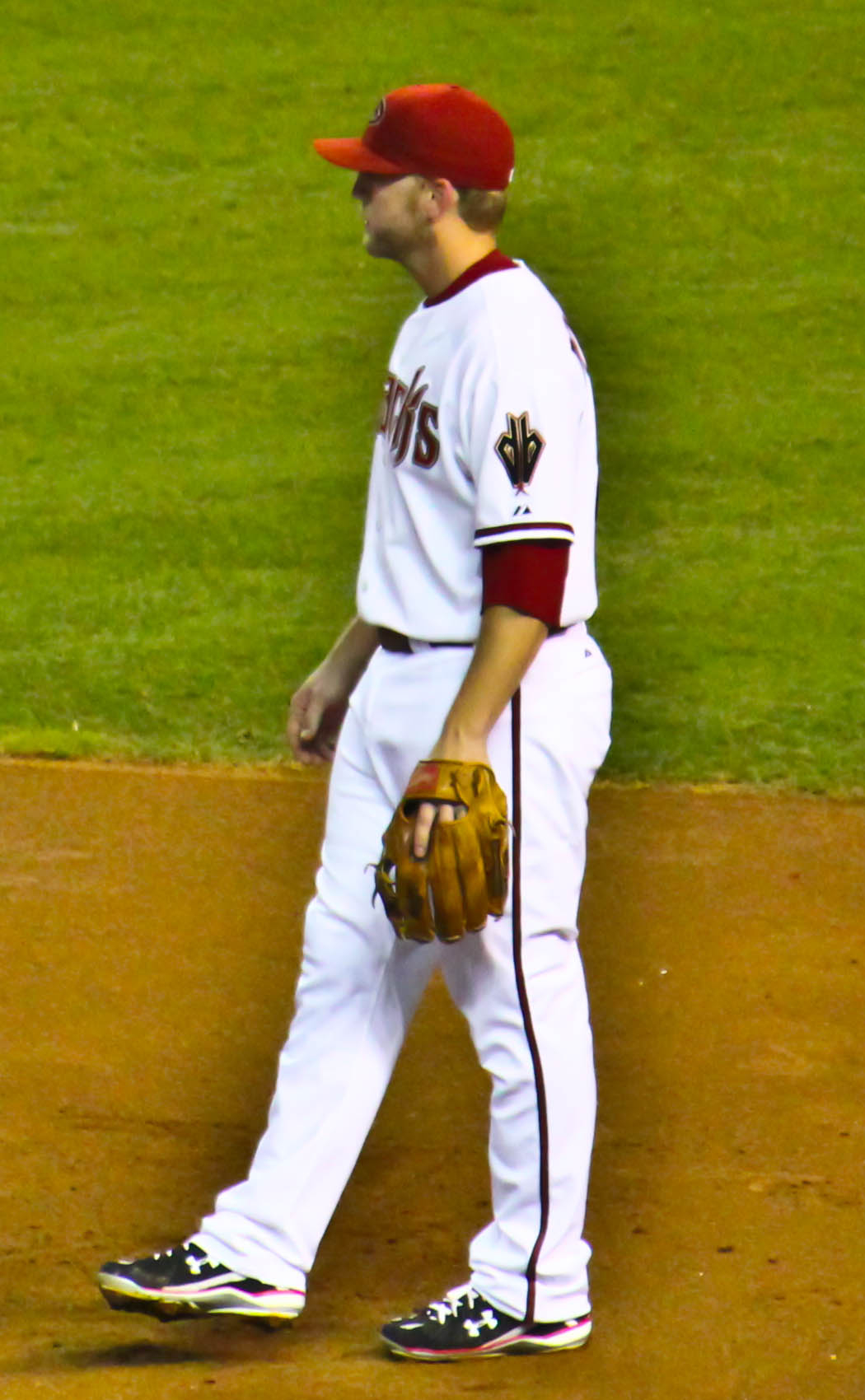
Reynolds playing for the Arizona Diamondbacks in 2010

On August 10, 2009, Reynolds was named the NL Player of the Week for the week ending August 9, beating out teammate Ryan Roberts (who finished second) in voting for the honor. Reynolds finished the week hitting .448 with 6 home runs, 32 total bases, 10 RBIs, 1 stolen base, a .515 on-base percentage, and a slugging percentage of 1.103. This was Reynolds's second NL Player of the Week award (the other being earlier this season for the week ending June 14). As tradition with the Player of the Week award, Reynolds received two wrist watches (one for each week), one of which he gave to his father, and the other of which he gave to his grandfather.

Reynolds played at first base for 26 games, where he had a .974 fielding percentage, the second-highest in the league of players with 125 or more innings at first base, and an 8.21 range factor, the best in the league. Reynolds helped improve his defensive skills by working with former Diamondbacks third baseman Matt Williams, during spring training; work that has raised his fielding percentage by over 50 points from the previous season. He has also made headlines for several notable catches including July 21 in Colorado, July 24 in Arizona, and August 1 in New York.

For the 2009 year, Reynolds had a .260 batting average, 44 home runs, 102 RBI, and 98 runs scored, along with 24 stolen bases. He also led the National League in power-speed number (31.1). He shattered his own 1-year-old major league record for strikeouts in a season in with 223 that year. It served as a single season record for times struck out until it was surpassed by Colson Montgomery 17 years later.

He led the major leagues in the Three True Outcomes (the total of the three main outcomes not involving defense) with 343.

==== 2010 season ====
After signing a three-year, $14.5 million contract extension on March 18, 2010, Reynolds began the season with two home runs in the first four games of the season. On May 20, Reynolds hit his 100th career home run off of the Giants' Tim Lincecum. Though he finished the season with 32 home runs, the sixth-highest total in the National League, along with 85 RBIs and a career-high 83 walks in 145 games, Reynolds again led the league in strikeouts with 211 and, having reached the mark three times, remained the only player in major league history to have at least 200 strikeouts in a season. Most notably, his .198 batting average established him as the first full-time position player in Major League history to finish the season with a lower batting average (x 1000) than strikeout total.

=== Baltimore Orioles (2011–2012) ===
Reynolds and a player to be named later (John Hester on April 30, 2011) were traded to the Baltimore Orioles for David Hernandez and Kam Mickolio on December 6, 2010. From the Diamondbacks' standpoint, the transaction, which was executed by new general manager Kevin Towers, was to improve the bullpen and reduce the record-breaking strikeout total by the team's batters (1,529 in 2010). The Orioles, on the other hand, needed a starting third baseman and a power hitter.

==== 2011 season ====
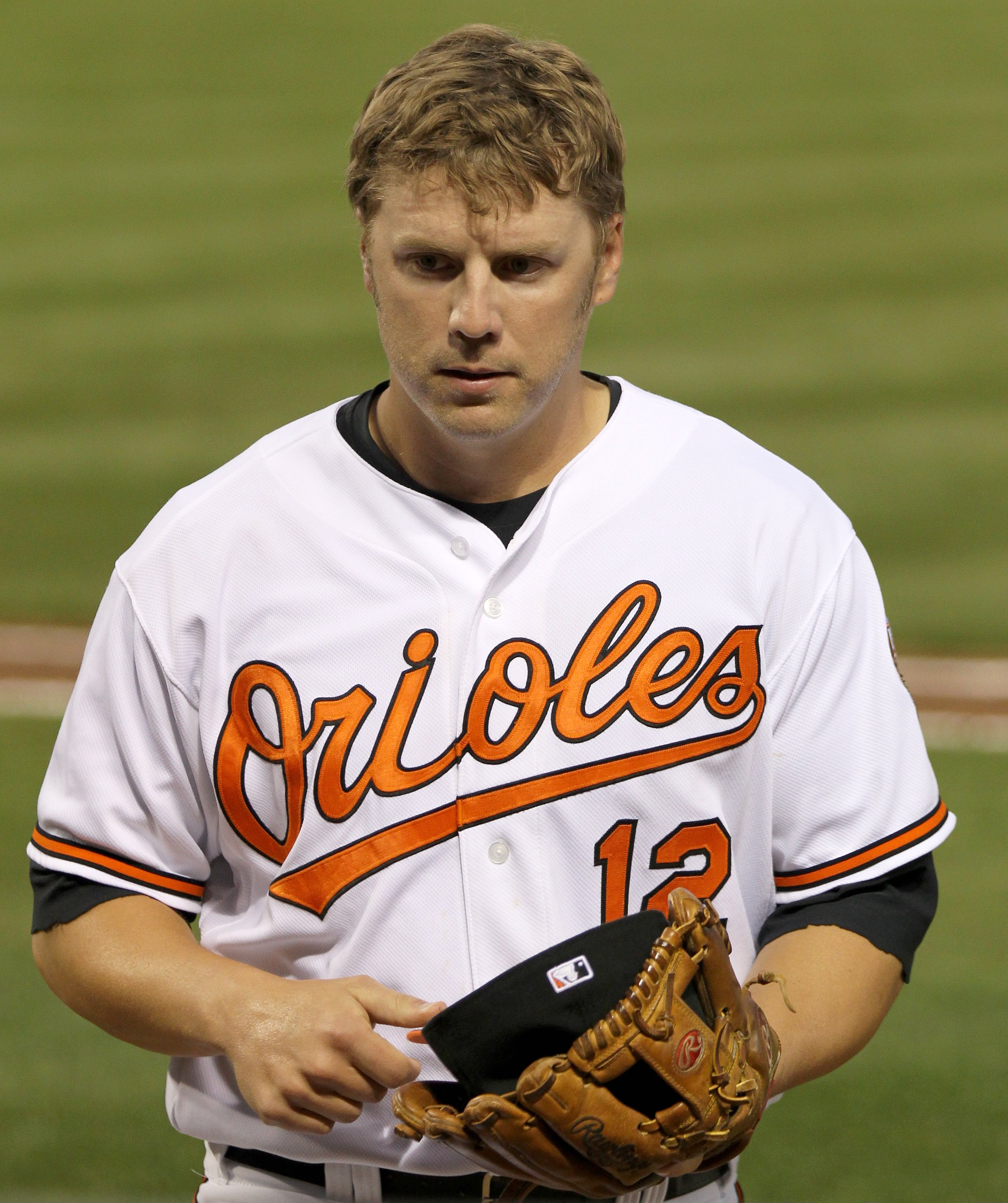
Reynolds during his tenure with the Baltimore Orioles in 2011

In 2011, Reynolds led all major leaguers in errors, with 31, as his .897 fielding percentage was the lowest of all major league third basemen, and led the American League in strikeouts, with 196. He batted .221, and was fourth in the league in home runs, with 37.

On August 7, facing Ricky Romero of the Toronto Blue Jays, Reynolds became the first player in the history of Oriole Park at Camden Yards (which was 19 years old at the time) to hit a home run into the 2nd Deck (Club Level) in Left Field. ESPN's Home Run Tracker measured the "True Distance" of the blast at 463 feet.

==== 2012 season ====
Reynolds was homerless until May 4 when he hit a home run against the Boston Red Sox. On the next day, May 5, he hit a three-run home run, his second of 2012. On May 29, he became the fastest position player to reach 1,000 strikeouts in major-league history, having done so in only 747 career games.

Reynolds started off the 2012 season at third base, but was moved over to play first base, with first baseman Chris Davis moving to third, early in the season. He excelled at first base, playing in 108 games there in 2012 and committing only five errors. He had a fielding percentage of .995, which was tied for fourth-best among first basemen in the major leagues.

On August 17, during a game between the Orioles and the Detroit Tigers, third baseman Manny Machado fielded a ground ball off the bat of Jhonny Peralta. Machado threw off line to Reynolds, who had to lay all the way out to catch the ball, and was unable to keep his foot on the bag long enough to record the out. Peralta and Tigers manager Jim Leyland argued to first base umpire Jeff Kellogg, who conferred with home plate umpire Tim Timmons. Kellogg's call was reversed, giving Peralta first base. Reynolds angrily threw his glove to the ground, causing him to be ejected by second base umpire Vic Carapazza. Orioles manager Buck Showalter angrily argued that Reynolds could not be ejected for throwing his glove, but he too was tossed, by third base umpire Marty Foster. Reynolds initially walked back onto the field, as if the umpires reversed the ejection call, only to return to the dugout moments later.

On September 6, Reynolds hit two home runs against the New York Yankees in a 10–6 Orioles win. It was only the second time since 1918 that a player had three multi-homer games against the Yankees in a single season, and it was Reynolds′ eighth home run in six games.

In 2012, Reynolds batted .221 for the second straight year, with 23 home runs and 69 RBIs. On October 31, the Orioles declined Reynolds's 2013 option. He was non-tendered on November 30, making him a free agent for the first time.

A tongue-in-cheek article appeared in Baseball Prospectus in January 2013 that purported to lay out evidence "proving" that Reynolds is blind.

=== Cleveland Indians (2013) ===
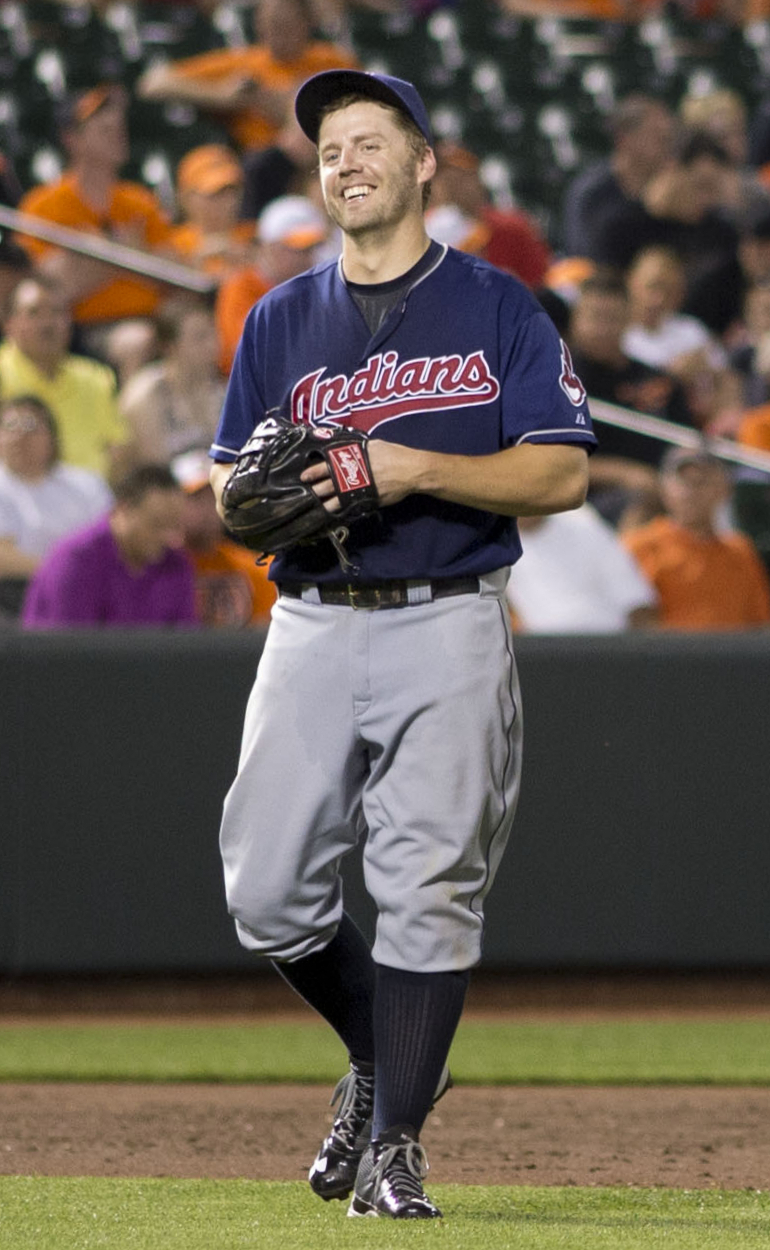
Reynolds with the Cleveland Indians in 2013

On December 9, 2012, Reynolds agreed to a one-year contract with the Cleveland Indians. On April 13, in a game against the Chicago White Sox, he hit his second career grand slam off of Chris Sale. He had eight home runs with a batting average of .301 in the month of April. However, he batted only .187 from May on. The Indians designated Reynolds for assignment on August 8. When he was designated for assignment, he was leading the team with 15 home runs but his batting average was only .215. The Indians released him on August 12.

=== New York Yankees (2013) ===
On August 15, 2013, Reynolds agreed to a deal with the New York Yankees. In his first at-bat as a member of the Yankees, he hit a home run against the Boston Red Sox. On August 28, Reynolds started at second base for the first time in his career while Robinson Canó and Eduardo Núñez were stricken with injuries. He batted .236 in 36 games with the Yankees, hitting six home runs and driving in 19 runs.

=== Milwaukee Brewers (2014) ===
On January 17, 2014, Reynolds signed a minor-league contract with the Milwaukee Brewers, with an invitation to major-league camp. Under the deal, Reynolds was to make $2 million, with an additional $500,000 in possible bonuses, if he made the major-league team. On March 25, the Brewers announced that Reynolds had made the Opening Day roster. He played in 130 games for the Brewers, hitting 22 home runs and driving in 45 runs, but posted only a .196 batting average for the season.

=== St. Louis Cardinals (2015) ===
On December 11, 2014, Reynolds signed with the St. Louis Cardinals on a one-year, $2 million contract that included playing times incentives. After five consecutive seasons with at least 21 home runs but batting averages that hovered between .196 and .221, he agreed to take a role as bench player to back up Matt Adams at first base and Matt Carpenter at third base. Reynolds hit his fourth career grand slam on May 4 against the Cubs, aiding the Cardinals to a 10–9 win. The next game, Reynolds's pinch-hit double drove in the go-ahead runs as the Cardinals defeated the Cubs, 7–4. He drove in the go-ahead run with a bases-loaded infield single on June 23 against the Miami Marlins in a 4–3 win.

As a member of the Cardinals, Reynolds' first multiple-home-run game came against the Pittsburgh Pirates in a 6−5 extra-inning loss on July 12. It was his 22nd career multi-home-run game. He played in 140 games for the Cardinals, batting .230, with 13 home runs and 48 RBIs.

=== Colorado Rockies (2016–2017) ===
Reynolds and the Colorado Rockies agreed to a one-year, $2.6 million contract on December 16, 2015, including up to an additional $1.1 million in performance bonuses. He appeared in 118 games in the 2016 season, and hit .282./356/.450 with 14 home runs and 53 RBIs in 393 at bats. He hit the third-longest home run in MLB in 2016, at 484 feet.

Reynolds signed a minor league contract with the Rockies on February 1, 2017. The contract included an invitation to spring training.

Due to an injury to Ian Desmond, Reynolds became the Rockies' Opening Day first baseman for 2017. On April 3, Reynolds went 2-for-3, hitting a two-run home run in the top the second, logging two runs, three RBIs, and a walk on Opening Day against the Brewers. On May 9, in a 10−4 victory versus the Cubs, he tied his personal best by homering in his fourth consecutive game, first achieved August 6−9, 2009. In 520 at bats over 148 games with the Rockies in 2017, Reynolds batted .267/.352/.487 with an .839 on-base-plus-slugging percentage, had 97 RBIs, and hit 30 home runs, his eighth season with 20 or more homers, with 175 strikeouts (4th in the league).

=== Washington Nationals (2018) ===
A free agent after the conclusion of the 2017 season, Reynolds went unsigned until April 12, 2018, when the Washington Nationals signed him to a minor-league contract. The Nationals assigned him to the Syracuse Chiefs of the Triple–A International League. He played in 10 games for Syracuse, batting .231 with a double and a home run in 39 plate appearances, before the Nationals selected his contract on May 12, after they placed starting first baseman Ryan Zimmerman on the 10-day disabled list with a right oblique strain.

Reynolds made his season debut on May 13, hitting two home runs in the game. On July 6, Reynolds hit a pinch-hit, walk-off home run against the Miami Marlins. The next night, Reynolds went 5–5 with 2 home runs, a double, and a career-high, franchise record-tying 10 RBI in an 18–4 win over the Marlins. It was the most RBI in a game by any player in MLB since Scooter Gennett’s 10 RBIs for the Cincinnati Reds during his 4 home run performance on June 6, 2017, and it tied the franchise record set by teammate Anthony Rendon in 2017. On July 9, he was named the National League Player of the Week after slashing .625/.684/1.313 with 12 RBI and 3 home runs in seven games. For the 2018 season, he batted .248/.328/.476 with 13 home runs and 40 RBI in 206 at bats.

=== Colorado Rockies (2019) ===
On January 30, 2019, Reynolds signed another minor league contract with the Rockies with an invitation to spring training. If added to the Rockies' 40-man roster, Reynolds will receive a one-year contract for $1 million plus up to an additional $1 million in performance bonuses. Reynolds said he had interest from other teams but wanted to play with a contender, and expects to make spot starts or be a pinch-hitter off the bench. He is expected to be a backup first baseman for Daniel Murphy, who was Reynolds' teammate in Washington. On March 22, Reynolds was announced to have made the roster for the 2019 season. On July 21, 2019, Reynolds was designated for assignment. He was released on July 26, 2019. In 2019 he batted .170/.290/.311 with four home runs in 135 at bats.

Reynolds announced his retirement on April 9, 2020.

== See also ==
- List of Major League Baseball annual fielding errors leaders
- List of Major League Baseball career home run leaders
- List of Major League Baseball career strikeouts by batters leaders
