= Sue Burns =

- Born: August 9, 1950; Anchorage, Alaska
- Died: July 19, 2009 (aged 58)
- Education: California State University-Hayward
- Occupation: Businesswoman

Sue Burns (August 9, 1950 – July 19, 2009) was an American businesswoman who was the senior general partner (principal owner and largest shareholder) of the San Francisco Giants baseball franchise.

== Early life ==
Burns was born in Anchorage, Alaska on August 9, 1950. She earned a degree at California State University-Hayward and was a math teacher at the Woodside Priory School in Portola Valley, California from 1983 to 1992. She was married to Harmon E. "Buzz" Burns who was an investor in the group that purchased the Giants in 1992. Mr. Burns acquired wealth as the Vice Chairman of the mutual fund investment firm Franklin Resources. He died of heart failure in 2006 at age 61. Upon his death Mrs. Burns became the principal owner of the Giants. Upon her death the family interest in the Giants (estimated at 20–40%) passed to her daughters, Trina Burns Dean and Tori Burns Humphrey. The role of managing partner for the Giants was assumed by Bill Neukom.

== Death ==
She died on July 19, 2009, a week after learning she had lung cancer.
