= 2008 Seattle Mariners season =

2008 Seattle Mariners
- League: American League
- Division: West
- Ballpark: Safeco Field
- City: Seattle, Washington
- Record: 61–101 (.377)
- Divisional place: 4th
- Owners: Nintendo of America (represented by Howard Lincoln)
- General managers: Bill Bavasi, Lee Pelekoudas
- Managers: John McLaren (dismissed June 20), Jim Riggleman
- Television: FSN Northwest (Dave Niehaus, Dave Sims, Rick Rizzs, Mike Blowers)
- Radio: KOMO (English) (Dave Niehaus, Rick Rizzs); KSZN (Spanish) (Alex Rivera, Julio Cruz)

The 2008 Seattle Mariners season was the 32nd Major League Baseball season in the team's history. Coming off the heels of the previous 2007 season, in which the Mariners finished with their first winning record since 2003, the team was widely expected to once again compete for the American League West championship. The team was bolstered by some major roster additions during the previous offseason, most notably starting pitchers Érik Bédard and Carlos Silva. However, by the end of May, it became apparent that the team had gone back to its losing ways of the 2004–06 seasons. Despite their losing ways, they won their first and last game of the season. Their longest winning-streak of the season was 4 games after a sweep of the Cleveland Indians at the end of August and a 12-6 win against the Texas Rangers on the first day of September. However, standing at 57–87, their longest losing-streak of the season was 12 games, 11 on the road, 1 at home, after being swept by the Los Angeles Angels of Anaheim, Kansas City Royals, Oakland Athletics, and suffering a loss at the last homestand opener against the Angels. On September 23, the Mariners became the first club to spend $100 million in payroll and lose 100 games. The team finished the season with a 61–101 (.377) record, last in the West for the 4th time in 5 years, and second worst in the majors.

With the team underperforming and underachieving, a number of people who had become scapegoats for the team's underperformance were dismissed during the season, most notably general manager Bill Bavasi, field manager John McLaren, first baseman Richie Sexson, and designated hitter José Vidro.

== Offseason ==
- December 20, 2007: Signed free agent RHP Carlos Silva to a four-year, $48 million contract.
- January 8, 2008: Signed free agent INF Miguel Cairo to a one-year, $850,000 contract
- January 31, 2008: Signed free agent OF Brad Wilkerson to a one-year, $3 million contract.
- February 8, 2008: Traded OF Adam Jones, LHP George Sherrill, and minor league pitchers Tony Butler, Chris Tillman, and Kam Mickolio to the Baltimore Orioles for LHP Érik Bédard.
- Dismissed all coaches hired under Mike Hargrove except hitting coach Jeff Pentland and hired former MLB managers Jim Riggleman (bench coach), Sam Perlozzo (third base coach), and Lee Elia (special assistant to the manager), as well as Mel Stottlemyre (pitching coach), Norm Charlton (bullpen coach), and Eddie Rodriguez (first base coach).

== Regular season ==
=== Season standings ===
AL West
Team	W	L	Pct.	GB	Home	Road
Los Angeles Angels of Anaheim	100	62	.617	—	50‍–‍31	50‍–‍31
Texas Rangers	79	83	.488	21	40‍–‍41	39‍–‍42
Oakland Athletics	75	86	.466	24½	43‍–‍38	32‍–‍48
Seattle Mariners	61	101	.377	39	35‍–‍46	26‍–‍55

=== Record vs. opponents ===
2008 American League record Source: MLB Standings Grid – 2008
Team	BAL	BOS	CWS	CLE	DET	KC	LAA	MIN	NYY	OAK	SEA	TB	TEX	TOR	NL
Baltimore	–	6–12	4–5	4–4	4–3	5–3	3–6	3–3	7–11	0–5	8–2	3–15	4–5	6–12	11–7
Boston	12–6	–	4–3	5–1	5–2	6–1	1–8	4–3	9–9	6–4	6–3	8–10	9–1	9–9	11–7
Chicago	5–4	3–4	–	11–7	12–6	12–6	5–5	9–10	2–5	5–4	5–1	4–6	3–3	1–7	12–6
Cleveland	4–4	1–5	7–11	–	11–7	10–8	4–5	8–10	4–3	5–4	4–5	5–2	6–4	6–1	6–12
Detroit	3–4	2–5	6–12	7–11	–	7–11	3–6	7–11	4–2	3–6	7–3	3–4	6–3	3–5	13–5
Kansas City	3–5	1–6	6–12	8–10	11–7	–	2–3	6–12	5–5	6–3	7–2	3–5	2–7	2–5	13–5
Los Angeles	6–3	8–1	5–5	5–4	6–3	3–2	–	5–3	7–3	10–9	14–5	3–6	12–7	6–3	10–8
Minnesota	3–3	3–4	10–9	10–8	11–7	12–6	3–5	–	4–6	5–5	5–4	3–3	5–5	0–6	14–4
New York	11–7	9–9	5–2	3–4	2–4	5–5	3–7	6–4	–	5–1	7–2	11–7	3–4	9–9	10–8
Oakland	5–0	4–6	4–5	4–5	6–3	3–6	9–10	5–5	1–5	-	10–9	3–6	7–12	4–6	10–8
Seattle	2–8	3–6	1–5	5–4	3–7	2–7	5–14	4–5	2–7	9–10	–	3–4	8–11	5–4	9–9
Tampa Bay	15–3	10–8	6–4	2–5	4–3	5–3	6–3	3–3	7–11	6–3	4–3	–	6–3	11–7	12–6
Texas	5–4	1–9	3–3	4–6	3–6	7–2	7–12	5–5	4–3	12–7	11–8	3–6	–	4–4	10–8
Toronto	12–6	9–9	7–1	1–6	5–3	5–2	3–6	6–0	9–9	6–4	4–5	7–11	4–4	–	8–10

=== Roster ===
2008 Seattle Mariners
Roster
Pitchers: 58 Cha Seung Baek; 43 Miguel Batista; 45 Érik Bédard; 48 Roy Corcoran; 41 R. A. Dickey; 31 Ryan Feierabend; 54 Sean Green; 34 Félix Hernández; 36 César Jiménez; 57 Mark Lowe; 26 Randy Messenger; 35 Brandon Morrow; 59 Eric O'Flaherty; 20 J. J. Putz; 53 Arthur Rhodes; 18 Ryan Rowland-Smith; 52 Carlos Silva; 60 Justin Thomas; 56 Jarrod Washburn; 40 Jared Wells; 49 Jake Woods	Catchers: 15 Jamie Burke; 9 Jeff Clement; 2 Kenji Johjima; 32 Rob Johnson; Infielders: 29 Adrián Beltré; 5 Yuniesky Betancourt; 13 Miguel Cairo; 23 Tug Hulett; 39 Bryan LaHair; 4 José López; 10 Greg Norton; 44 Richie Sexson; 27 Matt Tuiasosopo; 61 Luis Valbuena; 3 José Vidro	Outfielders: 50 Wladimir Balentien; 16 Willie Bloomquist; 28 Raúl Ibañez; 25 Charlton Jimerson; 12 Mike Morse; 8 Jeremy Reed; 51 Ichiro Suzuki; 6 Brad Wilkerson	Manager: 7 John McLaren; 47 Jim Riggleman; Coaches: 37 Norm Charlton (bullpen); 40 Jeff Pentland (hitting); 22 Sam Perlozzo (third base); 55 Lee Elia (bench); 47 Jim Riggleman (bench); 1 Eddie Rodríguez (first base); 30 Mel Stottlemyre (pitching); 58 Jose Castro (hitting)

=== In-season transactions ===
- April 2, 2008: Placed pitcher J. J. Putz on the 15-day disabled list and purchased the contract of pitcher Roy Corcoran from Triple-A Tacoma.
- April 11: Recalled IF Greg Norton from Triple-A Tacoma; designated OF Charlton Jimerson for assignment.
- April 14: Selected the contract of LHP Arthur Rhodes from Double-A West Tenn Diamond Jaxx; Recalled RHP R. A. Dickey from Triple-A Tacoma; Placed OF Mike Morse on 15-day disabled list with a dislocated left shoulder; Optioned LHP Eric O'Flaherty to Double-A West Tenn Diamond Jaxx.
- April 15: Placed LHP Érik Bédard on the 15-day disabled list, retroactive to April 9, with inflammation in his left hip.
- April 16: Recalled RHP Brandon Morrow from Double-A West Tenn Diamond Jaxx. Re-signed OF Charlton Jimerson to a Minor League contract. (He had been designated for assignment on April 10.)
- April 22: Activated RHP J. J. Putz from the 15-day disabled list; optioned RHP R. A. Dickey to Triple-A Tacoma.
- April 25: Signed C Kenji Johjima to a 3-year, $24 million contract extension through 2011.
- April 26: Activated LHP Érik Bédard from the 15-day disabled list; optioned RHP Roy Corcoran to Triple-A Tacoma.
- April 30: Recalled C Jeff Clement and OF Wladimir Balentien from Triple-A Tacoma; Designated INF Greg Norton and OF Brad Wilkerson for assignment.
- May 5: Traded Greg Norton to the Atlanta Braves for a player to be named or cash considerations; Released nonroster OF Bronson Sardinha.
- May 7: Released OF Brad Wilkerson, he had been designated for assignment on April 30.
- May 18: Optioned C Jeff Clement to Triple-A Tacoma.
- May 19: Recalled OF Jeremy Reed from Triple-A Tacoma; claimed RHP Tracy Thorpe off waivers from Toronto.
- May 21: Designated RHP Cha Seung Baek for assignment.
- May 22: Recalled RHP R. A. Dickey from Triple-A Tacoma.
- May 27: Acquired RHP Jared Wells from the San Diego Padres for RHP Cha Seung Baek.
- May 28: Optioned RHP Jared Wells to Triple-A Tacoma; Activated RHP Anderson Garcia from the 15-day disabled list and optioned him to Single-A High Desert.
- June 13: Placed RHP J. J. Putz on the 15-day disabled list with a hyper-extended right elbow; Recalled RHP Roy Corcoran from Triple-A Tacoma.
- June 16: Recalled C Jeff Clement from Triple-A Tacoma; Optioned OF Wladimir Balentien to Triple-A Tacoma.
- June 24: Acquired LHP Nelson Payano from the Atlanta Braves to complete the May 5 trade.
- July 1: Placed RHP Félix Hernández on the 15-day disabled list with a sprained left ankle retroactive to June 24; Recalled LHP Cesar Jimenez from Triple-A Tacoma.
- July 7: Released RHP Anderson Garcia.
- July 10: Recalled RHP Jared Wells from Triple-A Tacoma; Selected the contract of INF Tug Hulett from Triple-A Tacoma; Placed LHP Érik Bédard on the 15-day disabled list, retroactive to July 5, with stiffness in his left shoulder; Released INF Richie Sexson.
- July 11: Activated RHP Félix Hernández from the 15-day disabled list; Optioned RHP Jared Wells to Triple-A Tacoma.
- July 17: Optioned INF Tug Hulett to Triple-A Tacoma; Signed OF Julio Morban and RHP Francisco Valdivia.
- July 18: Recalled 1B Bryan LaHair from Triple-A Tacoma.
- July 20: Activated RHP J. J. Putz from the 15-day disabled list; Optioned LHP Ryan Rowland-Smith to Triple-A Tacoma.
- July 25: Signed RHP Jorge Sosa to a minor league contract.
- July 30: Claimed RHP Luis Munoz off waivers from Pittsburgh and optioned him to Double-A West Tenn.
- July 31: Acquired RHP Gaby Hernandez from the Florida Marlins in exchange for LHP Arthur Rhodes.
- August 13: Released DH/INF José Vidro (Designated for assignment on August 5)

==== Front office/coaching staff ====
- June 9, 2008: Dismissed hitting coach Jeff Pentland and named special assistant Lee Elia as his replacement
- June 16: Dismissed general manager Bill Bavasi and named vice president/assistant GM Lee Pelekoudas as interim GM
- June 19: Dismissed field manager John McLaren and named bench coach Jim Riggleman as interim manager. Elia promoted to bench coach and minor league hitting instructor Jose Castro promoted to hitting coach.

=== Individual accomplishments ===
- May 18: OF Ichiro Suzuki breaks the franchise stolen base record of 290 previously held by Julio Cruz in a game against the San Diego Padres. (Cruz, watched from the broadcast booth as Suzuki broke his record.)
- June 17: RHP Félix Hernández throws an immaculate inning (retiring all three batters via strikeout using only nine pitches to do so) against the Florida Marlins, becoming the 13th American League pitcher to do so.
- June 23: Félix Hernández hits a grand slam off New York Mets pitcher (and fellow Venezuelan) Johan Santana, becoming the first pitcher in franchise history to hit a home run and the first American League pitcher to hit a grand slam in modern interleague play.
- July 6: C Jamie Burke pitched in the 15th inning of a game against the Detroit Tigers after catching the previous six innings. Burke, who had made four relief appearances in the minor leagues, was saddled with a loss and became the first position player to receive a decision as a pitcher since 2000.
- July 15: Ichiro Suzuki plays in his eighth consecutive MLB All-Star Game.
- July 29: Ichiro Suzuki records his 3,000th major-league hit (1,278 in Nippon Professional Baseball and 1,722 in MLB) in a game against the Texas Rangers.
- September 1: 3B Adrián Beltré hit for the cycle against the Texas Rangers, becoming the fourth Mariner to accomplish the feat. Beltre's cycle came hours after Arizona Diamondbacks shortstop Stephen Drew hit for the cycle in a game against the St. Louis Cardinals, marking the first time two players hit for the cycle in the same day since 1920.
- September 18: Ichiro Suzuki records his 200th hit of the season, completing eight straight seasons of accomplishing the feat, tying the major league with Hall of Famer Willie Keeler, who did so from 1894 through 1901.

=== Game log ===
2008 Game Log
March/April

#	Date	Opponent	Score	Win	Loss	Save	Attendance	Record
1	March 31	Rangers	5 – 2	Green (1-0)	Millwood (0-1)	Putz (1)	46,334	1-0
2	April 1	Rangers	5 – 4	Benoit (1-0)	Putz (0-1)	Wilson (1)	25,204	1-1
3	April 2	Rangers	4 – 1	Silva (1-0)	Jennings (0-1)	Batista (1)	21,349	2-1
4	April 4	@ Orioles	7 – 4	Trachsel (1-0)	Washburn (0-1)	Sherrill (2)	14,429	2-2
5	April 5	@ Orioles	6 – 4	Albers (1-0)	Batista (0-1)	Sherrill (3)	24,824	2-3
6	April 6	@ Orioles	3 – 2	Sarfate (1-0)	Lowe (0-1)		19,215	2-4
7	April 7	@ Orioles	5 – 4	Sarfate (2-0)	O'Flaherty (0-1)	Sherrill (4)	10,774	2-5
8	April 8	@ Rays	6 – 5	Bédard (1-0)	Glover (0-1)	Rowland-Smith (1)	36,048	3-5
9	April 9	@ Rays	7 – 1	Washburn (1-1)	Sonnanstine		12,106	4-5
10	April 10	@ Rays	7 – 0	Jackson (2-0)	Batista (0-2)		11,898	4-6
11	April 11	Angels	8 – 5	Hernández (1-0)	Weaver (1-2)	Lowe (1)	28,915	5-6
12	April 12	Angels	8 – 3	Silva (2-0)	Garland (1-2)		34,963	6-6
13	April 13	Angels	10 – 5	Saunders (2-0)	Baek (0-1)		30,664	6-7
14	April 14	Royals	5 – 1	Greinke (3-0)	Washburn (1-2)		16,751	6-8
15	April 15	Royals	11 – 6	Batista (1-2)	Bale (0-3)		17,137	7-8
16	April 16	@ Athletics	4 – 2	Hernández (2-0)	Blanton (1-3)		21,126	8-8
17	April 17	@ Athletics	8 – 1	Silva (3-0)	DiNardo (1-1)		10,164	9-8
18	April 18	@ Angels	5 – 4	Saunders (3-0)	Dickey (0-1)	Rodríguez (7)	43,939	9-9
19	April 19	@ Angels	4 – 1	Santana (3-0)	Washburn (1-2)	Shields (1)	43,959	9-10
20	April 20	@ Angels	4 – 2	Batista (2-2)	Moseley (1-2)	Rowland-Smith (2)	43,631	10-10
21	April 22	Orioles	4 – 2	Rhodes (1-0)	Guthrie (0-2)	Putz (2)	17,780	11-10
22	April 23	Orioles	3 – 2	Cabrera (2-0)	Rowland-Smith (0-1)	Sherrill (7)	16,823	11-11
23	April 24	Orioles	8 – 7	Bradford (2-1)	Green (1-1)	Sherrill (8)	16,727	11-12
24	April 25	Athletics	4 – 3	Eveland (3-1)	Batista (2-3)	Street (7)	40,845	11-13
25	April 26	Athletics	5 – 3	Bédard (2-0)	Duchscherer (1-1)		37,563	12-13
26	April 27	Athletics	4 – 2	Blanton (2-4)	Hernández (2-1)	Street (8)	32,612	12-14
27	April 29	@ Indians	7 – 2	Lowe (1-1)	Betancourt (1-1)		13,827	13-14
28	April 30	@ Indians	8 – 3	Lee (5-0)	Washburn (1-4)		15,279	13-15

May

#	Date	Opponent	Score	Win	Loss	Save	Attendance	Record
29	May 1	@ Indians	3 – 2 (11)	Kobayashi (2-0)	Green (1-2)		15,722	13-16
30	May 2	@ Yankees	5 – 1	Wang (6-0)	Bedard (2-1)		52,199	13-17
31	May 3	@ Yankees	6 – 1	Mussina (4-3)	Hernández (2-2)		52,180	13-18
32	May 4	@ Yankees	8 – 2	Rasner (1-0)	Silva (3-1)		53,542	13-19
33	May 5	Rangers	7 – 3	Washburn (2-4)	Millwood (2-3)		16,637	14-19
34	May 6	Rangers	10 – 1	Ponson (2-0)	Batista (2-4)		15,818	14-20
35	May 7	Rangers	2 – 0	Padilla (5-2)	Bedard (2-2)	Wilson (8)	17,173	14-21
36	May 8	Rangers	5 – 0	Germán (1-0)	Hernández (2-3)		22,922	14-22
37	May 9	White Sox	4 – 2	Contreras (3-3)	Silva (3-2)	Jenks (7)	27,169	14-23
38	May 10	White Sox	8 – 4	Vázquez (4-3)	Washburn (2-5)		33,078	14-24
39	May 11	White Sox	6 – 3	Batista (3-4)	Floyd (3-2)	Putz (3)	30,346	15-24
40	May 12	@ Rangers	13 – 12 (10)	Mathis (1-0)	Morrow (0-1)		18,509	15-25
41	May 13	@ Rangers	5 – 2	Rupe (2-1)	Hernández (2-4)	Guardado (1)	15,766	15-26
42	May 14	@ Rangers	4 – 3 (12)	Putz (1-1)	German (1-2)	Washburn (1)	22,934	16-26
43	May 16	Padres	6 – 4	Young (4-3)	Batista (3-5)	Hoffman (8)	35,586	16-27
44	May 17	Padres	4 – 2	Bédard (3-2)	Wolf (2-4)	Putz (4)	32,290	17-27
45	May 18	Padres	3 – 2	Rhodes (2-0)	Bell (0-3)	Putz (5)	35,483	18-27
46	May 20	@ Tigers	12 – 8	Verlander (2-7)	Silva (3-3)	Jones (7)	39,463	18-28
47	May 21	@ Tigers	9 – 4	Rogers (4-4)	Washburn (2-6)		36,495	18-29
48	May 22	@ Tigers	9 – 2	Bonderman (3-4)	Batista (3-6)	Dolsi (1)	40,166	18-30
49	May 23	@ Yankees	13 – 2	Pettitte (4-5)	Bédard (3-3)		52,005	18-31
50	May 24	@ Yankees	12 – 6	Mussina (7-4)	Silva (3-4)		53,512	18-32
51	May 25	@ Yankees	6 – 5	Ramírez (1-0)	Putz (1-2)	Rivera (12)	54,269	18-33
52	May 26	Red Sox	5 – 3	Colón (2-0)	Hernández (2-5)		35,818	18-34
53	May 27	Red Sox	4 – 3	Putz (2-3)	Timlin (2-3)		30,758	19-34
54	May 28	Red Sox	1 – 0	Bédard (4-3)	Wakefield (3-4)	Putz (6)	30,752	20-34
55	May 30	Tigers	7 – 4	Robertson (3-5)	Silva (3-5)	Jones (8)	34,019	20-35
56	May 31	Tigers	5 – 0	Hernández (3-5)	Verlander (2=8)		33,441	21-35

June

#	Date	Opponent	Score	Win	Loss	Save	Attendance	Record
57	June 1	Tigers	7 – 5	Miner (2-3)	Putz (2-3)		38,610	21-36
58	June 2	Angels	4 – 2	Santana (8-2)	Washburn (2-7)	Rodríguez (22)	22,110	21-37
59	June 3	Angels	5 – 4	Saunders (9-2)	Bédard (4-4)	Rodríguez (23)	23,534	21-38
60	June 4	Angels	5 – 4	Weaver (5-6)	Silva (3-6)	Rodríguez (24)	32,774	21-39
61	June 6	@ Red Sox	8 – 0	Hernández (4-5)	Colón (3-1)		37,757	22-39
62	June 7	@ Red Sox	11 – 3	Wakefield (4-4)	Batista (3-7)		37,443	22-40
63	June 8	@ Red Sox	2 – 1	Masterson (3-0)	Green (1-2)	Papelbon (18)	37,198	22-41
64	June 9	@ Blue Jays	3 – 2 (10)	Dickey (1-1)	Frasor (1-1)	Putz (7)	20,073	23-41
65	June 10	@ Blue Jays	3 – 1	McGowan (5-4)	Silva (3-7)		36,170	23-42
66	June 11	@ Blue Jays	2 – 1	Hernández (5-5)	Ryan (1-3)	Morrow (1)	35,702	24-42
67	June 13	Nationals	7 – 6	Hill (1-3)	Dickey (1-2)	Rauch (14)	35,941	24-43
68	June 14	Nationals	5 – 2	Clippard (1-1)	Batista (3-8)	Rauch (15)	32,145	24-44
69	June 15	Nationals	6 – 2	Colomé (2-1)	Lowe (1-3)		38,548	24-45
70	June 16	Marlins	6 – 1	Miller (5-5)	Silva (3-8)		21,609	24-46
71	June 17	Marlins	5 – 4	Hernández (6-5)	Olsen (4-4)	Morrow (2)	20,214	25-46
72	June 18	Marlins	8 – 3	Tucker (2-1)	Dickey (1-3)		24,163	25-47
73	June 20	@ Braves	10 – 2	Rowland-Smith (1-1)	Campillo (2-2)		40,268	26-47
74	June 21	@ Braves	5 – 4	Boyer (2-5)	Batista (3-9)		47,158	26-48
75	June 22	@ Braves	8 – 3	Hudson (8-5)	Silva (3-9)		30,965	26-49
76	June 23	@ Mets	5 – 2	Rowland-Smith (2-1)	Santana (7-6)	Rhodes (1)	49,789	27-49
77	June 24	@ Mets	11 – 0	Dickey (2-3)	Pérez (5-5)		49,386	28-49
78	June 25	@ Mets	8 – 2	Maine (8-5)	Batista (3-10)		52,154	28-50
79	June 27	@ Padres	5 – 2	Washburn (3-7)	Wolf (5-7)	Morrow (3)	28,640	29-50
80	June 28	@ Padres	4 – 2	Silva (4-9)	Baek (1–4)	Morrow (4)	36,396	30-50
81	June 29	@ Padres	9 – 2	Bédard (5-4)	Peavy (5-5)		29,966	31-50
82	June 30	Blue Jays	2 – 0	Halladay (9-6)	Dickey (2-4)		30,179	31-51

July

#	Date	Opponent	Score	Win	Loss	Save	Attendance	Record
83	July 1	Blue Jays	7 – 6	Morrow (1-1)	Downs (0-2)		24,586	32-51
84	July 2	Blue Jays	4 – 2	Washburn (4-7)	McGowan (6-7)	Morrow (5)	23,283	33-51
85	July 3	Tigers	8 – 4	Verlander (5–9)	Silva (4–10)	Rodney (1)	22,523	33-52
86	July 4	Tigers	4 – 1	Bédard (6-4)	Rogers (6–6)	Morrow (6)	30,564	34-52
87	July 5	Tigers	3 – 2	Batista (4-10)	Rodney (0-2)	Morrow (7)	30,373	35-52
88	July 6	Tigers	2 – 1 (15)	López (3–1)	Burke (0-1)	Jones (16)	29,083	35-53
89	July 7	@ Athletics	4 – 3	Eveland (7-5)	Washburn (4-8)	Street (17)	11,129	35-54
90	July 8	@ Athletics	2 – 0	Duchscherer (10-5)	Silva (4-11)		12,543	35-55
91	July 9	@ Athletics	6 – 4	Corcoran (1-0)	Blanton (5-12)	Morrow (8)	21,128	36-55
92	July 10	@ Athletics	3 – 2 (11)	Street (2-2)	Jiménez (0-1)		15,187	36-56
93	July 11	@ Royals	3 – 1	Hochevar (6-7)	Hernández (6-6)	Soria (25)	25,345	36-57
94	July 12	@ Royals	5 – 4	Ramírez (1-0)	Morrow (1-2)		23,792	36-58
95	July 13	@ Royals	4 – 3	Green (2-2)	Soria (1-2)	Morrow (9)	21,421	37-58
96	July 18	Indians	8 – 2	Hernández (7-6)	Laffey (5-6)		42,570	38-58
97	July 19	Indians	9 – 6	Sowers (1-5)	Batista (4-11)		37,869	38-59
98	July 20	Indians	6 – 2	Lee (13-2)	Silva (4–12)		32,230	38-60
99	July 21	Red Sox	4 – 0	Lester (8-3)	Washburn (4-9)	Papelbon (29)	37,861	38-61
100	July 22	Red Sox	4 – 2	Matsuzaka (11-1)	Dickey (2-5)	Papelbon (30)	38,425	38-62
101	July 23	Red Sox	6 – 3	Papelbon (4-3)	Green (2-3)	Hansen (2)	43,231	38-63
102	July 25	@ Blue Jays	5 – 4 (10)	Carlson (3-1)	Lowe (1-4)		28,463	38-64
103	July 26	@ Blue Jays	8 – 3	Purcey (1-1)	Dickey (2-6)		33,041	38-65
104	July 27	@ Blue Jays	5 – 1	Washburn (5-9)	Marcum (5-5)		33,367	39-65
105	July 28	@ Rangers	7 – 5	Green (3-3)	Francisco (2-3)	Morrow (10)	21,742	40-65
106	July 29	@ Rangers	11 – 10	Wilson (1-2)	Putz (2-4)		17,618	40-66
107	July 30	@ Rangers	4 – 3	Guardado (2-2)	Rhodes (2-1)	Wilson (24)	23,894	40-67
108	July 31	@ Rangers	8 – 5	Dickey (3-6)	Harrison (2-2)		17,839	41-67

August

#	Date	Opponent	Score	Win	Loss	Save	Attendance	Record
109	August 1	Orioles	10 – 5	Olson (8-5)	Washburn (5-10)		28,114	41-68
110	August 2	Orioles	3 – 1	Guthrie (8-8)	Hernández (7-7)		30,502	41-69
111	August 3	Orioles	8 – 4	Putz (3-4)	Cabrera (7-7)		33,334	42-69
112	August 4	Twins	11 – 6	Corcoran (2-0)	Bass (3-4)		27,758	43-69
113	August 5	Twins	8 – 7	J. J. Putz (4-4)	Guerrier (6-5)		26,083	44-69
114	August 6	Twins	7 – 3	Blackburn (9-6)	Washburn (5-11)		30,441	44-70
115	August 7	Rays	2 – 1	Putz (5-4)	Wheeler (2-5)		25,423	45-70
116	August 8	Rays	5 – 3	Shields (10-7)	Silva (4-13)	Percival (25)	30,220	45-71
117	August 9	Rays	8 – 7 (11)	Bradford (4-3)	Batista (4-12)	Percival (26)	27,905	45-72
118	August 10	Rays	11 – 3	Jackson (9-7)	Dickey (3-7)		30,336	45-73
119	August 12	@ Angels	7-3	Garland (11-7)	Washburn (5-12)	Rodríguez (46)	42,086	45-74
120	August 13	@ Angels	10 – 7 (12)	Corcoran (3-0)	Speier (1-5)		42,754	46-74
121	August 15	@ Twins	9-3	Liriano (3-3)	Silva (4-14)		32,208	46-75
122	August 16	@ Twins	7-6	Reyes (3-0)	Jimenez (0-3)		36,316	46-76
123	August 17	@ Twins	11-8	Perkins (10-3)	Feierabend (0-1)	Nathan (33)	35,478	46-77
124	August 18	@ White Sox	13-5	Buehrle (11-10)	Washburn (5-13)		39,002	46-78
125	August 19	@ White Sox	5-0	Richard (1-2)	Hernández (7-8)		26,414	46-79
126	August 20	@ White Sox	15-3	Floyd (13-6)	Dickey (3-8)		27,000	46-80
127	August 21	Athletics	2-0	Smith (6-12)	Rowland-Smith (2-2)	Ziegler (4)	25,611	46-81
128	August 22	Athletics	7-5	Corcoran (4-0)	Blevins (1-3)	Putz (8)	26,603	47-81
129	August 23	Athletics	5 – 1	Eveland (8-8)	Washburn (5-14)		34,145	47-82
130	August 24	Athletics	8 – 4	Hernández (8-8)	Meyer (0-2)	Putz (9)	28,731	48-82
131	August 25	Twins	4 – 2 (11)	Dickey (4-8)	Crain (5-4)		23,277	49-82
132	August 26	Twins	3 – 2	Rowland-Smith (3-2)	Baker (7-4)	Corcoran (1)	26,292	50-82
133	August 27	Twins	6 – 5	Perkins (12-3)	Green (3-4)	Nathan (36)	23,581	50-83
134	August 29	@ Indians	3 – 2	Hernández (9-8)	Sowers (2-7)	Putz (10)	26,047	51-83
135	August 30	@ Indians	4 – 3 (10)	Putz (6-4)	Lewis (0-4)	Messenger (1)	33,387	52-83
136	August 31	@ Indians	6 – 4	Rowland-Smith (4-2)	Jackson (0-1)	Corcoran (2)	35,376	53-83

September

#	Date	Opponent	Score	Win	Loss	Save	Attendance	Record
137	September 1	@ Rangers	12 – 6	Green (4-4)	Mendoza (3-7)		16,171	54-83
138	September 2	@ Rangers	6 – 4	McCarthy (1-0)	Feierabend (0-2)	Francisco (3)	14,521	54-84
139	September 3	@ Rangers	1 – 0	Nippert (2-4)	Hernández (9-9)	Francisco (4)	12,882	54-85
140	September 5	Yankees	3 – 1	Morrow (2-2)	Pettitte (13-12)	Putz (11)	39,518	55-85
141	September 6	Yankees	7 – 4	Ponson (8-5)	Green (4-5)	Rivera (33)	44,473	55-86
142	September 7	Yankees	5 – 2	Feierabend (1-2)	Mussina (17-8)	Putz (12)	42,677	56-86
143	September 9	Rangers	7 – 3	Padilla (13-7)	Hernández (9-10)	Madrigal (1)	22,704	56-87
144	September 10	Rangers	8-7	Corcoran (5-0)	Millwood (9-9)	Putz (13)	23,644	57-87
145	September 11	@ Angels	7 – 4	Weaver (11-10)	Morrow (2-3)	Rodríguez (57)	38,205	57-88
146	September 12	@ Angels	5 – 3	Arredondo (8-2)	Batista (4-13)		43,743	57-89
147	September 13	@ Angels	5 – 2	Garland (14-8)	Feierabend (1-3)	Rodríguez (58)	43,757	57-90
148	September 14	@ Angels	4 – 3	Arredondo (9-2)	Corcoran (5-1)		41,528	57-91
149	September 15	@ Royals	3 – 0	Davies (7-7)	Silva (4-15)	Soria (38)	10,307	57-92
150	September 16	@ Royals	6 – 3	Duckworth (3-1)	Morrow (2-4)	Soria (39)	19,135	57-93
151	September 17	@ Royals	5 – 2	Meche (12-11)	Corcoran (5-2)	Soria (40)	13,382	57-94
152	September 18	@ Royals	12 – 0	Greinke (12-10)	Feierabend (1-4)		14,144	57-95
153	September 19	@ Athletics	2 – 0	Eveland (9-8)	Hernández (9-11)	Ziegler (10)	30,149	57-96
154	September 20	@ Athletics	8 – 7	Street (7-5)	Thomas (0-1)	Ziegler (11)	18,756	57-97
155	September 21	@ Athletics	5 – 3	Ziegler (3-0)	Batista (4-14)	Devine (1)	18,707	57-98
156	September 22	Angels	2 – 1	Santana (16-6)	Rowland-Smith (4-3)	Rodríguez (61)	19,717	57-99
157	September 23	Angels	9 – 6	Corcoran (6-2)	Jepsen (0-1)	Putz (14)	19,065	58-99
158	September 24	Angels	6 – 5	Oliver (7-1)	Lowe (1-5)	Rodríguez (62)	19,015	58-100
159	September 25	Angels	6 – 4	Arredondo (10-2)	Putz (6-5)	Shields (4)	16,939	58-101
160	September 26	Athletics	10 – 8	Morrow (3-4)	Gallagher (2-3)	Corcoran (3)	24,662	59-101
161	September 27	Athletics	7 – 3	Rowland-Smith (5-3)	Smith (7-16)	Green (1)	24,440	60-101
162	September 28	Athletics	4 – 3	R. A. Dickey (5-8)	Outman (0-1)	J. J. Putz (15)	25,000 (approx.)	61-101

== Player stats ==
=== Batting ===
Note: G = Games played; AB = At bats; H = Hits; Avg. = Batting average; HR = Home runs; RBI = Runs Batted In

Player	G	AB	H	Avg.	HR	RBI
Greg Norton	6	16	7	.438	0	4
Ichiro Suzuki	162	686	213	.310	6	42
José López	159	644	191	.297	17	89
Raúl Ibañez	162	635	186	.293	23	110
Yuniesky Betancourt	153	559	156	.279	7	51
Willie Bloomquist	71	165	46	.279	0	9
Jeremy Reed	97	286	77	.269	2	31
Adrián Beltré	143	566	148	.266	25	77
Jamie Burke	48	92	24	.261	1	8
Bryan LaHair	45	146	34	.250	3	10
Miguel Cairo	108	221	55	.249	0	23
Luis Valbuena	18	49	12	.245	0	1
José Vidro	85	308	72	.234	7	45
Brad Wilkerson	19	56	13	.232	0	5
Jeff Clement	66	203	46	.227	5	23
Kenji Johjima	112	379	86	.227	7	39
Tug Hulett	30	49	11	.224	1	2
Michael Morse	5	9	2	.222	0	0
Richie Sexson	74	252	55	.218	11	30
Wladimir Balentien	71	243	49	.202	7	24
Matt Tuiasosopo	14	44	7	.159	0	2
Rob Johnson	14	31	4	.129	1	2
Charlton Jimerson	2	1	0	.000	0	0
Pitcher totals	162	23	4	.174	1	4
Team totals	162	5643	1498	.265	124	631

=== Pitching ===
==== Starting pitchers ====
Note: G = Games pitched; IP = Innings pitched; W = Wins; L = Losses; ERA = Earned run average; SO = Strikeouts

Player	G	IP	W	L	SV	ERA	SO
Félix Hernández	31	200.2	9	11	0	3.45	175
Carlos Silva	28	153.1	4	15	0	6.46	69
Érik Bédard	15	81.0	6	4	0	3.67	72
Miguel Batista	44 (20 starts, 4 holds)	115.0	4	14	1	6.26	73
Jarrod Washburn	28 (26 starts)	153.2	5	14	1	4.69	87
Ryan Feierabend	8	39.2	1	4	0	7.71	26

==== Relief pitchers ====
Note: G = Games pitched; IP = Innings pitched; SV = Saves; W = Wins; L = Losses; H = Holds; ERA = Earned run average; SO = Strikeouts

Player	G	IP	W	L	H	SV	ERA	SO
J. J. Putz	47	46.1	6	5	0	15	3.88	56
Sean Green	72	79	4	5	17	1	4.67	62
Eric O'Flaherty	7	6.2	0	1	2	0	20.25	4
Mark Lowe	57	63.2	1	5	1	1	5.37	55
Roy Corcoran	50	72.2	6	2	8	3	3.22	39
Cha Seung Baek	10 (1 start)	30	0	1	0	0	5.40	15
Ryan Rowland-Smith	47 (12 starts)	118.1	5	3	1	2	3.42	77
R. A. Dickey	32 (14 starts)	112.1	5	8	0	0	5.21	58
Arthur Rhodes	36	22	2	1	13	1	2.86	26
Brandon Morrow	45 (5 starts)	64.2	3	4	3	10	3.34	75
César Jiménez	31 (2 starts)	34.1	0	2	4	0	3.41	26
Jake Woods	15	19	0	0	1	0	6.16	9
Randy Messenger	13	12.2	0	0	2	1	3.55	7
Jared Wells	6	5.1	0	0	0	0	10.13	3
Justin Thomas	8	4	0	1	1	0	6.75	2
Jamie Burke	1	1	0	1	0	0	9.00	0
Team Pitching Totals	162	1435.1	61	101	57	36	4.73	1016

== Farm system ==
Level	Team	League	Manager
AAA	Tacoma Rainiers	Pacific Coast League	Daren Brown
AA	West Tenn Diamond Jaxx	Southern League	Scott Steinmann
A	High Desert Mavericks	California League	Jim Horner
A	Wisconsin Timber Rattlers	Midwest League	Terry Pollreisz
A-Short Season	Everett AquaSox	Northwest League	José Moreno
Rookie	Pulaski Mariners	Appalachian League	Rob Mummau
Rookie	AZL Mariners	Arizona League	Andy Bottin

== Major League Baseball draft ==
2008 Seattle Mariners draft picks
Information
Owner	Nintendo of America
General Manager(s)	Bill Bavasi; Lee Pelekoudas; Jack Zduriencik
Manager(s)	John McLaren; Jim Riggleman
First pick	Joshua Fields (Rule 4); Reegie Corona (Rule 5)
Draft positions	20 (Rule 4); 2 (Rule 5)
Number of selections	50 (Rule 4); 2 (Rule 5)
Players signed (Rule 4)	36
Links
Results	Baseball-Reference; The Baseball Cube
Official Site	The Official Site of the Seattle Mariners
Years	2007 • 2008 • 2009

Below is a complete list of the Seattle Mariners draft picks from the two 2008 Major League Baseball drafts.

The Seattle Mariners took part in both the Major League Baseball Rule 4 draft and the Rule 5 draft in 2008.

The 2008 Major League Baseball draft was held on June 5 and June 6, 2008. He Mariners made the 20th selection in the draft, selecting Joshua Fields. The Mariners selected a total of 50 players and signed 36 of those selected players.

In the 2008 Rule 5 draft the Mariners selected two players, one in the Major League phase and one in the Triple-A phase. They also had three players selected by other teams, two in the Triple-A phase and one in the Double-A phase.

=== Key ===
Round (Pick)	Indicates the round and pick the player was drafted
Position	Indicates the secondary/collegiate position at which the player was drafted, rather than the professional position the player may have gone on to play
**Bold**	Indicates the player signed with the Mariners before the deadline
Italics	Indicates the player did not sign with the Mariners before the deadline
**Bold italics**	Indicates a player was signed after the deadline

=== Table ===
Round (Pick)	Name	Position	School	Ref
1 (20)	**Joshua Fields**	Right-handed pitcher	University of Georgia	
2 (20)	**Dennis Raben**	Outfielder	University of Miami	
3 (98)	**Aaron Pribanic**	Right-handed pitcher	University of Nebraska–Lincoln	
4 (132)	**Steven Hensley**	Right-handed pitcher	Elon University	
5 (162)	**Brett Lorin**	Right-handed pitcher	Long Beach State University	
6 (192)	**Jarrett Burgess**	Outfielder	Florida Christian School	
7 (222)	**Nate Tenbrink**	Third baseman	Kansas State University	
8 (252)	**Bobby LaFromboise**	Left-handed pitcher	University of New Mexico	
9 (282)	William Morrison	Right-handed pitcher	Western Michigan University	
10 (312)	Nate Newman	Right-handed pitcher	Pepperdine University	
11 (342)	Matt Jensen	Second basemen	Clovis East High School	
12 (372)	**Kenn Kasparek**	Right-handed pitcher	University of Texas	
13 (402)	**Ryan Royster**	Outfielder	University of California, Davis	
14 (432)	**Luke Burnett**	Right-handed pitcher	Louisiana Tech University	
15 (462)	**Jacob Shaffer**	Outfielder	Northern Kentucky University	
16 (492)	**Bennett Billingsley**	Second baseman	Lenoir Community College	
17 (422)	Michael Dennhardt	Right-handed pitcher	Don Bosco Preparatory High School	
18 (552)	**Travis Howell**	Catcher	Long Beach State University	
19 (582)	**Taylor Lewis**	Right-handed pitcher	Yavapai College	
20 (612)	**Frederick Bello**	Shortstop	Cerro Coso Community College	
21 (642)	**Jordan Alvis**	Right-handed pitcher	Middle Tennessee State University	
22 (672)	**Blake Nation**	Right-handed pitcher	Georgia Southern University	
23 (702)	**Brandon Maurer**	Right-handed pitcher	Orange Lutheran High School	
24 (732)	**Henry Contreras**	Catcher	Cal State LA	
25 (762)	Paul Robinson	Second baseman	Paris Junior College	
26 (792)	**Taylor Stanton**	Right-handed pitcher	Diablo Valley College	
27 (822)	**Tommy Johnson**	Catcher	Marshall University	
28 (852)	**Scott Savastano**	Shortstop	Franklin Pierce College	
29 (882)	**Stephen Penney**	Right-handed pitcher	University of California, Riverside	
30 (912)	**Brad Reid**	Right-handed pitcher	Bellevue College	
31 (942)	**Randy Castillo**	Right-handed pitcher	Aiea High School	
32 (972)	**Nick Love**	Right-handed pitcher	Bellevue University	
33 (1002)	**Kyle Brown**	Left-handed pitcher	University of California, Santa Barbara	
34 (1032)	Ty Tostenson	Outfielder	Oak Ridge High School	
35 (1062)	**Nicholas Czyz**	Left-handed pitcher	University of Kansas	
36 (1092)	**Chris Kirkland**	Right-handed pitcher	University of Memphis	
37 (1122)	**Brandon Pullen**	Left-handed pitcher	San Diego State University	
38 (1152)	**Andres Esquibel**	Right-handed pitcher	University of Kansas	
39 (1182)	**Christian Staehely**	Right-handed pitcher	Princeton University	
40 (1212)	Troy Channing	Catcher	Foothill High School	
41 (1242)	Henry Cotto	Outfielder	GateWay Community College	
42 (1272)	**Randy Molina**	First baseman	Stanford University	
43 (1302)	Mike Kindel	Outfielder	Springboro High School	
44 (1332)	**Donnie Jobe**	Second baseman	Elon University	
45 (1360)	Andrew Kittredge	Right-handed pitcher	Ferris High School	
46 (1387)	Alvin Rittman	Outfielder	Germantown High School	
47 (1414)	Richard O'Donald	Right-handed pitcher	John Dickinson High School	
48 (1468)	D. J. Mauldin	Right-handed pitcher	California Poly San Luis Obispo	
49 (1468)	**Joshua Rodriguez**	Catcher	South Mountain Community College	
50 (1495)	Walker Kelly	Left-handed pitcher	Arlington Heights High School	

== Rule 5 draft ==
=== Key ===
Pick	Indicates the pick the player was drafted
Previous team	Indicates the previous organization, not minor league team

=== Table ===
Phase	Pick	Name	Position	Previous team	Notes	Ref
Major League	2	Reegie Corona	Shortstop	New York Yankees	Corona was returned to the Yankees before the regular season.	
Triple-A	2	Pat Ryan	Right-handed pitcher	Milwaukee Brewers	none	
