= Lee Pelekoudas =

American baseball executive

Lee Pelekoudas (born 1950 or 1951) is a former executive with the Seattle Mariners of Major League Baseball (MLB), most notable for serving as the club's interim general manager from June 16 to October 21, 2008.

== Biography ==
Pelekoudas is of Greek descent and the son of former MLB umpire Chris Pelekoudas. He grew up in Sunnyvale, California.

Pelekoudas was selected by the Montreal Expos in the 23rd round of the 1969 MLB draft but attended Arizona State University instead. He was a pitcher on the Sun Devils team that went to the 1972 College World Series. He did not pitch professionally due to an arm injury.

Pelekoudas joined the Mariners in December 1979 as a travel director. He became a director of baseball administration in 1987 and senior director in 1995. He became the vice president of baseball administration in September 1997, then associate general manager (GM) in 2005. He interviewed for the open Mariners GM job in 1999 and 2003. When GM Bill Bavasi was fired on June 16, 2008, Pelekoudas was named interim GM by CEO Howard Lincoln and president Chuck Armstrong. During his tenure, several coaches and players who had become scapegoats for the team's poor performance during the 2008 season were dismissed, including hitting coach Jeff Pentland, manager John McLaren, and veteran players Richie Sexson and José Vidro.

Pelekoudas returned to his former position when Jack Zduriencik was hired as the Mariners' GM on October 21. Pelekoudas resigned from the Mariners on September 1, 2009.

Pelekoudas is married and has two sons who have also worked for MLB teams. Chris is a scout with the Miami Marlins.

Sporting positions
Preceded by Bill Bavasi	Seattle Mariners General Manager; 2008	Succeeded by Jack Zduriencik
