= Payano =

Payano is a surname. Notable people with this surname include:

- Anabel Payano (fl. 2022), a Dominican beauty queen
- Juan Carlos Payano (born 1984), a Dominican boxer
- Nelson Payano (born 1982), a Dominican baseball pitcher
- Pavel Payano (fl. 2006–present), an American state politician from Massachusetts
- Pedro Payano (born 1994), a Dominican-American baseball pitcher
