= Jack Zduriencik =

American baseball executive (born 1951)

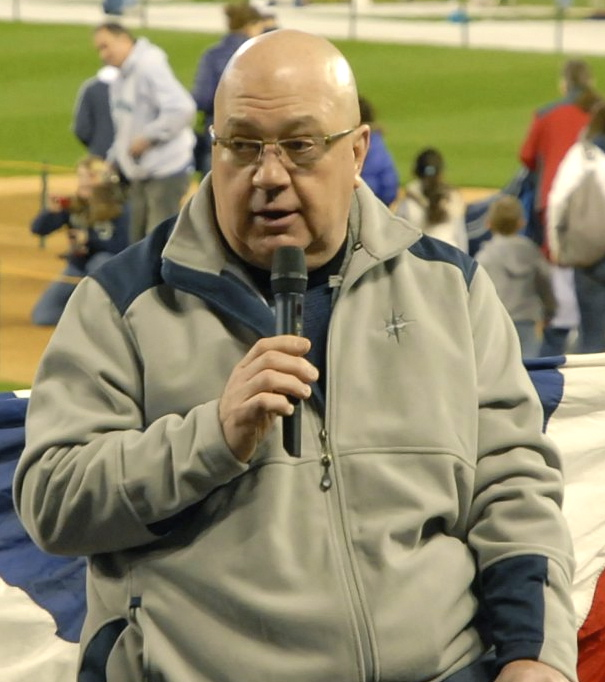
- Zduriencik in 2011
- Born: January 11, 1951 (age 75); New Castle, Pennsylvania, U.S.
- Education: California University of Pennsylvania

John A. Zduriencik (/zɜːrˈɛnsɪk/; born January 11, 1951) is an American radio broadcaster and former professional baseball executive, scout, and player. He currently works as a radio host for KDKA-FM, which is affiliated with the Pittsburgh Pirates. He also served as the general manager of the Seattle Mariners from 2008 until 2015.

== Career ==
Zduriencik began his career in professional baseball as a second baseman in the Chicago White Sox farm system. From 1973 to 1974, he spent time playing for both the Gulf Coast League White Sox and the Appleton Foxes.

Following his playing career, Zduriencik spent several years as a coach for both baseball and football. His coaching tour included stops at Austin Peay State University (1975–77), Clairton High School (Pennsylvania, 1977–80), and Tarpon Springs High School (Florida, 1980–82).

Zduriencik returned to professional baseball in 1983. Successive roles involving scouting and player development comprised most of the next two-plus decades of his experience, as he spent time in the positions of:

- Area scout, 1983–1989, New York Mets
- National crosschecker, 1990 and 1994–1995, New York Mets
- Director of scouting, 1991–1993, Pittsburgh Pirates
- Director of minor league operations, 1995–1998, New York Mets
- Special assistant to the general manager, 1998, New York Mets
- Director of international operations, 1998–1999, Los Angeles Dodgers
- Director of scouting, 1999–2006, Milwaukee Brewers
- Special assistant to the general manager, 2006–2008, Milwaukee Brewers
- Director of amateur scouting, 2006–2008. Milwaukee Brewers
- Special assistant to the GM for player personnel, 2008, Milwaukee Brewers.

Zduriencik was so successful in Milwaukee that many observers felt that he deserved a large part of the credit for the Brewers' eventual return to playoff contention in 2008. Brewers general manager Doug Melvin praised Zduriencik's efforts: "No doubt about it, he deserves almost all the credit for the young players we have. The players he has drafted are making an impact at the big league level."

In recognition of his success with the Brewers, Baseball America made Zduriencik the first non-GM to receive their Major League Executive of the Year Award in 2007.

== Seattle Mariners ==
In October 2008, following a dismal season and the firing of general manager Bill Bavasi, the Seattle Mariners announced the hiring of Zduriencik as the franchise's new general manager. At the time, the team was the first to have lost 100 games while shouldering a player payroll of more than $100 million, and it was reported by critics at the time to be a good hire.

At an October 2008 press conference following his hiring, Zduriencik got right to the point in introducing his philosophy going forward in Seattle: “I'd love to have guys with good makeup and good character, committed to the city and the ballclub. But, when all is said and done, talent wins.”

One of Zduriencik's first moves was hiring Don Wakamatsu, the first Asian-American manager in MLB history. Next, during the MLB Winter Meetings in Las Vegas, Zduriencik made a remarkable three-team, 12-player trade that sent star closer J. J. Putz to the Mets as well as prospect second baseman Luis Valbuena to the Cleveland Indians. In return, the Mariners received outfielders Franklin Gutiérrez, Endy Chávez, and prospects Mike Carp and Jason Vargas. During spring training, Zduriencik signed Mariners fan favorite Ken Griffey Jr. to a one-year deal.

After an 85–77 finish in 2009, Zduriencik's teams slumped to 61–101 in 2010, 67–95 in 2011, 75–87 in 2012, and 71–91 in 2013.

On December 7, 2013, Seattle Times columnist Geoff Baker wrote a scathing article about Zduriencik, quoting past employees to show that he is difficult to work with. He was accused of lying about knowledge of Josh Lueke's criminal past before a trade with the Tampa Bay Rays. He is also accused of lying on his original job application that he has an advanced knowledge of and fondness for contemporary baseball sabermetrics of the Billy Beane mold, knowing that it would be beneficial in getting him hired. An employee whom Zduriencik fired, Tony Blengino, made the claim that he, not Zduriencik, falsified Jack's resume, according to Baker's article in the Seattle Times: "Blengino, who was working for the Milwaukee Brewers with Zduriencik at the time, said he authored virtually the entire job application package Zduriencik gave the Mariners in 2008, depicting a dual-threat candidate melding traditional scouting with advanced statistical analysis."

Asked to respond to accusations by former manager Eric Wedge and Blengino, Zduriencik said: “I am aware of some of the comments of former members of our baseball operations group, and I find them unjust, misleading and one-sided. I don’t believe the airing of ‘dirty laundry’ should take place in the public arena, so I am not going to talk about internal meetings, daily conversations and personnel decisions.”

Zduriencik subsequently issued a public statement in response to the accusations in Baker's column. The statement read in part: "I can also say that our current statistical analysis group is doing excellent work. Our dedicated staff and the tools they are using are a key component in our decision making process, and are light years ahead of where we have been. I am engaged with their work on a daily basis and very excited in the improvements made... We have never deviated from our rebuilding plan. We have stayed the course, and we now have a talented group of young players. We are hard at work looking into every option to add to this core group, as we said we would, and we are looking forward to 2014 and beyond."

Zduriencik's assertion that advanced metrics have always been part of his office's player evaluation process seems to have been borne out by his 2009 hire of Jeff Kingston as his assistant general manager. Kingston had conducted "research involves Sabermetrics, a scientific statistical analysis of players and teams designed to project future performance." In addition, Mariners baseball operations analyst Wesley Battle and quantitative analyst Jesse Smith brought a sabermetric perspective to their work with the club's front office. In 2014, the Mariners enjoyed an 87-win season, an improvement of 16 wins over the previous year's total, and missed the playoffs by a single game.

On August 26, 2014, the Mariners extended Zduriencik's contract to a multi-year deal, based on the positive performance of the team in the 2014 season. Club President Kevin Mather expressed confidence that the Mariners were "in position to be a contender for many years to come" and thought Zduriencik was making a "valiant effort".

The Mariners fired Zduriencik on August 28, 2015. During his tenure in Seattle, the Mariners posted a 505–595 record, the fifth-worst record in baseball.

== Education ==
Zduriencik earned a bachelor's degree in education at California University of Pennsylvania, followed by a master's degree in physical education at Austin Peay State University.

== Personal life ==
Self nicknamed "Trader Jack", Jack is married and has one daughter. He is also an alumnus of Sigma Tau Gamma fraternity.

Zduriencik began working as the pre- and post-game co-host for the Pittsburgh Pirates on their flagship station KDKA-FM in 2016.

Preceded by Lee Pelekoudas	Seattle Mariners General Manager; 2009–2015	Succeeded by Jeff Kingston (interim)
