= Nelson Payano =

Dominican professional baseball pitcher (born 1982)

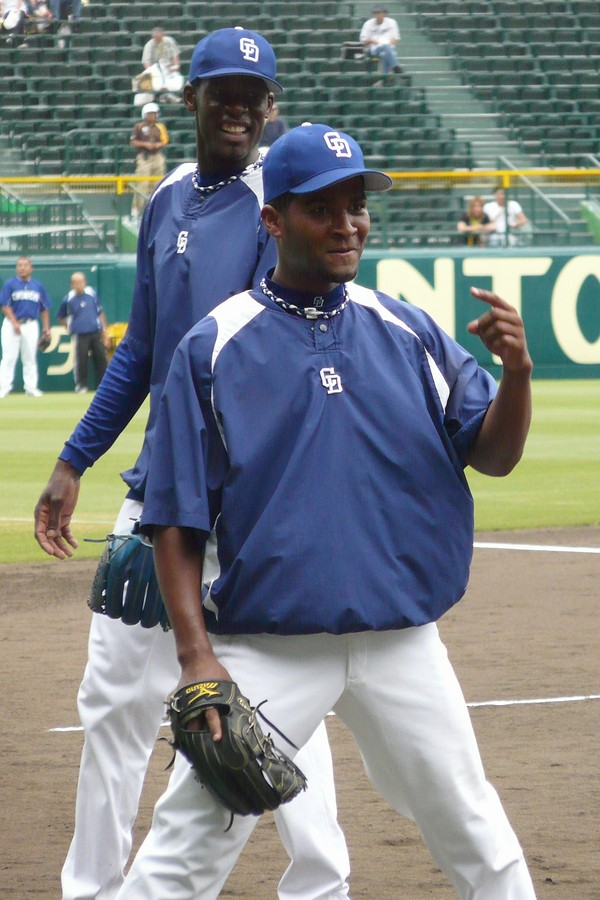

Free agent
- Pitcher
- Born: November 13, 1982 (age 42); Santo Domingo, Dominican Republic
- Bats: Left Throws: Left

NPB statistics
- Win–loss record: 2–1
- Earned run average: 2.08
- Strikeouts: 39

Teams
- Chunichi Dragons (2009, 2014)

Nelson Rafael Payano (born November 13, 1982) is a Dominican professional baseball pitcher who is currently a free agent. He played the 2009 season for the Chunichi Dragons of Nippon Professional Baseball (BPB).

Payano began his professional career in 2003 with the Gulf Coast League Braves. Over the next several years, he moved up through the Atlanta Braves organization, and in 2008, while playing for the double-A Mississippi Braves, he was traded to the Seattle Mariners to complete an earlier deal in which the Braves acquired Greg Norton.

Following the 2008 season, Payano was acquired by the NPB Chunichi Dragons. That season, he appeared in 34 games for the Dragons, winning 2 games and losing 1. After the season ended, Payano was released.

Prior to the 2010 season, Payano was signed to a minor league contract by the Kansas City Royals. He was released during spring training, and was signed by the Houston Astros. He began the season with the Corpus Christi Hooks, but he was released on July 11.
