= Roy Corcoran =

American baseball player (born 1980)

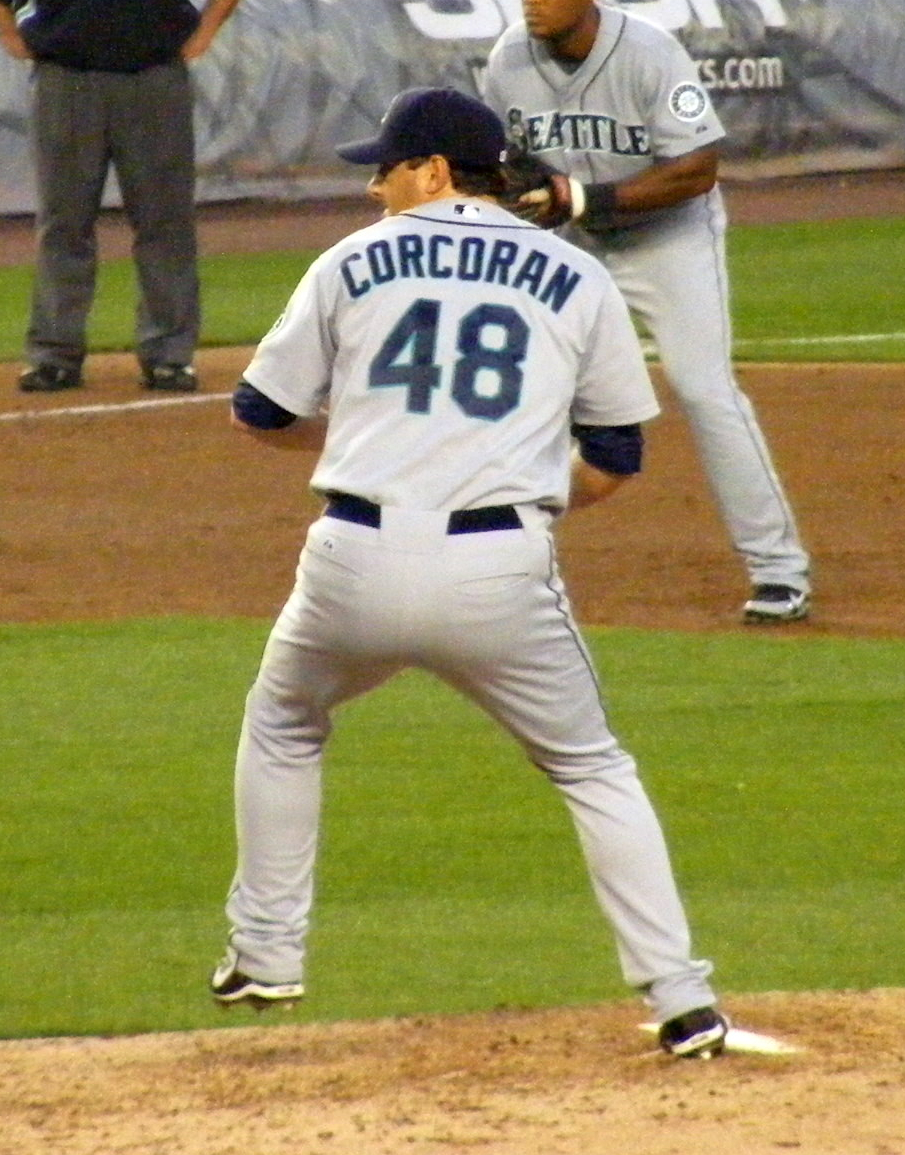
- Corcoran with the Seattle Mariners
- Pitcher
- Born: May 11, 1980 (age 45); Baton Rouge, Louisiana, U.S.
- Batted: Right Threw: Right

MLB debut
- July 30, 2003, for the Montreal Expos

Last MLB appearance
- July 21, 2009, for the Seattle Mariners

MLB statistics
- Win–loss record: 8–3
- Earned run average: 4.17
- Strikeouts: 57
- Stats at Baseball Reference

Teams
- Montreal Expos / Washington Nationals (2003–2004, 2006); Seattle Mariners (2008–2009)

Roy Elliot Corcoran (born May 11, 1980) is an American former professional baseball pitcher. He previously played in Major League Baseball from 2003 to 2009 for the Montreal Expos, Washington Nationals and Seattle Mariners. He threw and batted right-handed.

== Professional career ==
=== Montreal Expos/Washington Nationals ===
Corcoran signed with the Montreal Expos on June 21, 2001, as an amateur free agent. After starting the 2003 season at Single-A, Corcoran advanced through Double-A and made two appearances in Triple-A before making his major league debut on July 30. He spent the next three years in the minors with the Expos and stayed with them after they became the Washington Nationals. Corcoran appeared in a few games in the 2004 and 2006 seasons.

=== Florida Marlins ===
Corcoran was granted free agency after 2006, and signed a minor league contract with the Florida Marlins on January 4, 2007. Corcoran spent all of the 2007 season with the Marlins Triple-A affiliate, the Albuquerque Isotopes, becoming a free agent at the end of the season.

=== Seattle Mariners ===
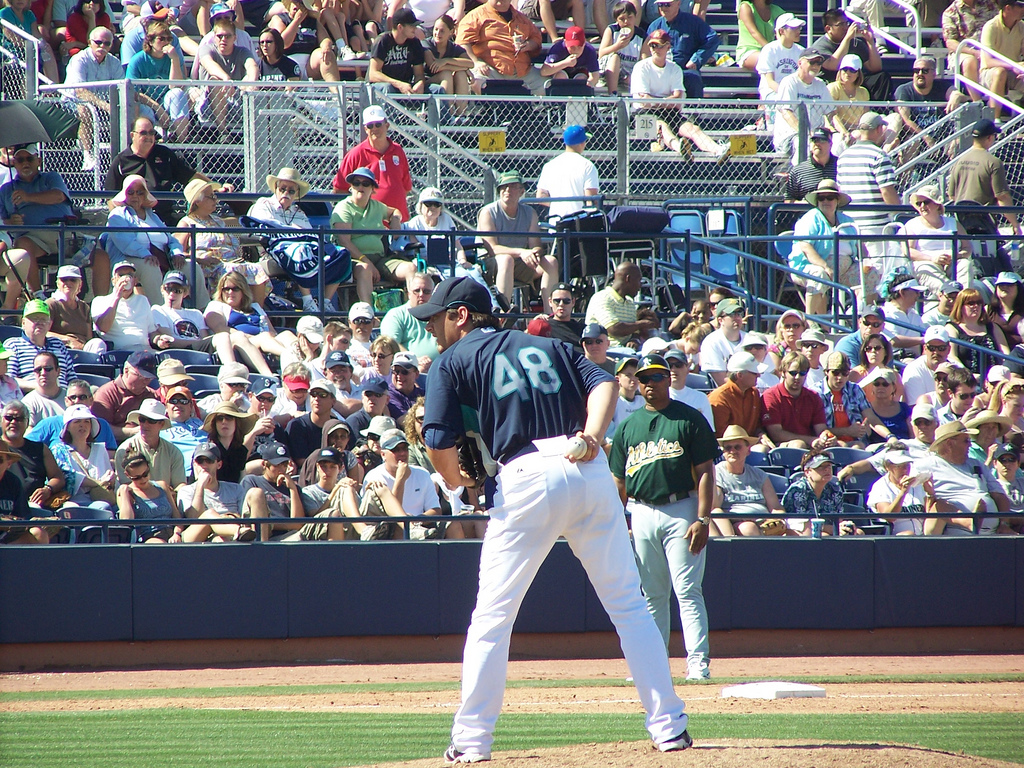
Corcoran pitches one inning during the Mariners' 8–5 win over the Oakland A's.

On November 21, 2007, the Seattle Mariners signed Corcoran to a minor league contract and invited him to spring training. Corcoran had a career-best year in 2008. In 50 appearances, he had a 6–3 record, 3.22 ERA, and 39 strikeouts.

The Mariners designated Corcoran for assignment on July 24, 2009. Corcoran was 2–0 with a 6.16 ERA in 16 games in 2009. He had a six-week stint on the disabled list with a strained neck. He cleared waivers and elected free agency.

=== Houston Astros ===
On August 5, 2009 Corcoran signed a minor league contract with the Houston Astros that included an invitation to spring training. He played for the Triple-A affiliate Round Rock Express.

He was granted free agency after the 2010 season.

=== Los Angeles Dodgers ===
On July 4, 2011, Corcoran signed a minor league contract with the Los Angeles Dodgers. He appeared in 2 games for the AA Chattanooga Lookouts and 19 games for the AAA Albuquerque Isotopes, finishing a combined 1–3 with a 6.81 ERA. He elected free agency following the season on November 2.

=== Sugar Land Skeeters ===
On March 22, 2013, Corcoran signed with the Sugar Land Skeeters of the Atlantic League of Professional Baseball. He became a free agent following the season. In 49 games 56 innings of relief he went 6-4 with a 2.73 ERA with 36 strikeouts and 2 saves.

On April 8, 2014, Corcoran re-signed a new contract with the Skeeters for the 2014 season. He became a free agent following the season. In 60 games 62.2 innings of relief he went 4-0 with a 2.30 ERA with 60 strikeouts and 1 save.

=== Rieleros de Aguascalientes ===
On February 12, 2015, Corcoran signed with the Rieleros de Aguascalientes of the Mexican League. He was released on July 4. In 35 games 37 innings of relief he went 3-7 with a 5.11 ERA with 36 strikeouts and 17 saves.

== Personal life ==
During the offseason after the 2008 season, Corcoran married his wife Lacy, and they currently reside in Slaughter, Louisiana. His brother, Tim Corcoran, also played professional baseball.
