= Jared Wells =

American baseball player (born 1981)

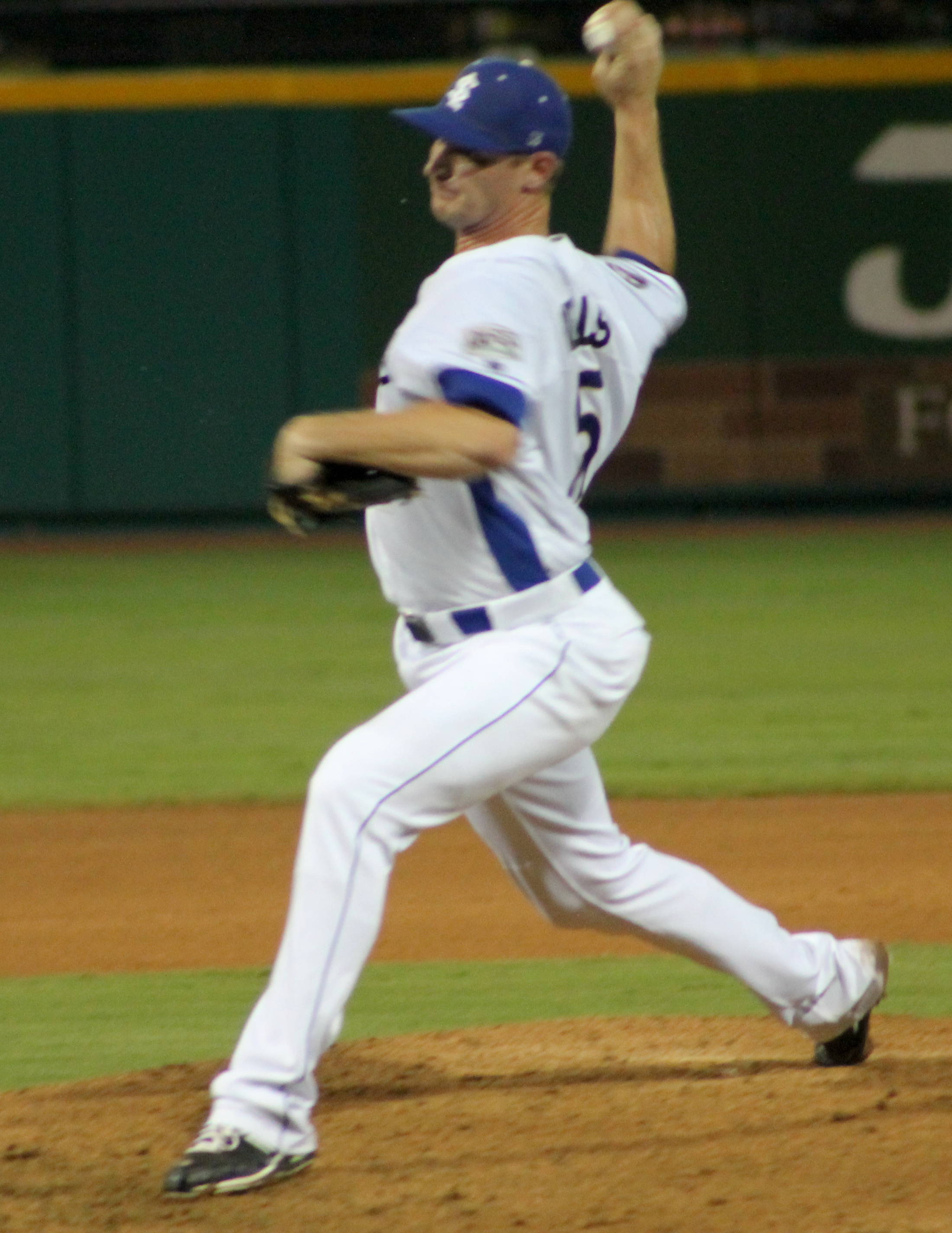
- Wells with the Sugar Land Skeeters in 2014
- Pitcher
- Born: October 31, 1981 (age 44); Freeport, Texas, U.S.
- Batted: Right Threw: Right

MLB debut
- May 24, 2008, for the San Diego Padres

Last MLB appearance
- September 18, 2008, for the Seattle Mariners

MLB statistics
- Win–loss record: 0–0
- Earned run average: 8.64
- Strikeouts: 5
- Stats at Baseball Reference

Teams
- San Diego Padres (2008); Seattle Mariners (2008)

Jared Linn Wells (born October 31, 1981) is an American former professional baseball pitcher. He pitched in eight Major League Baseball (MLB) games with the San Diego Padres and Seattle Mariners in 2008.

== Playing career ==
=== Amateur career ===
Wells graduated from Columbia High School in West Columbia, Texas in 2000. He then played college football at East Texas Baptist University, but switched to pursue baseball after suffering an injury. He then played college baseball at San Jacinto College. Later, during his tenure in the minors, he played for the U.S national team in the 2005 Baseball World Cup.

=== San Diego Padres ===
Wells was selected by the San Diego Padres in the 31st round of the 2002 Major League Baseball draft and signed by Padres scout Jay Darnell in 2003. That year, Wells was assigned to the Short-Season A Eugene Emeralds. He had a record of 4–6 with a 2.75 earned run average (ERA), which was seventh lowest among Northwest League starters.

In 2004, Wells was sent up to the Single-A Fort Wayne Wizards. He compiled a 4–6 record with 4.09 ERA in 14 starts. This earned him a promotion to the Advanced-A Lake Elsinore Storm there he had a record of 4–6 with a 4.52 ERA in 12 starts.

Wells returned to at the Advanced-A level but he soon found himself a promotion to the Double-A Mobile BayBears in 2005. He went 13–8 with a 3.68 ERA in a combined 163 1/3 innings between the two clubs, tied for the lead among Padres' farmhands in wins, while his ERA ranked fourth. Wells captured the California League ERA title. He was named the league's Pitcher of the Year and the Padres Minor League Pitcher of the Year.

Wells split the 2006 season between Double-A Mobile and the Triple-A Portland Beavers. In 12 games at Mobile, he went 4–3 with a 2.64 ERA. He was promoted to Triple-A on June 17, where he struggled with a 2–9 record with a 7.27 ERA. In 2007 Wells saw consistent action at the Triple-A level with Portland but struggled in his transition to the bullpen. Wells went 2–9 with a 5.24 ERA. He also recorded nine saves.

In 2008, Wells had a 1–1 record with a 5.85 ERA. Even though his performance was sub-par, he was called up for the first time in his career on May 22, 2008, and made his major league debut with the Padres on May 24.

=== Seattle Mariners ===
After two appearances with the Padres, they traded Wells to the Mariners on May 28 for pitcher Cha Seung Baek. Wells was assigned to Triple-A Tacoma Rainiers. He was called up by the Mariners on July 10, then optioned to the minkrs when Félix Hernández was activated the next day. Wells pitched once for the Mariners in August, then in five September games. He finished his only MLB season with no decisions and an 8.64 ERA.

Wells pitched for Tacoma after starting the season with the Double-A West Tenn Diamond Jaxx in 2009.

=== Later career ===
Wells pitched for the Houston Astros Double-A and Triple-A affiliates in 2010. The Astros released him in March 2011. On February 5, 2012, he signed a minor league contract with the Colorado Rockies and pitched that season with the Triple-A Colorado Springs Sky Sox.

Wells pitched for the Sugar Land Skeeters of the Atlantic League of Professional Baseball in 2013 and 2014.

== Personal life ==
Wells and his wife have two children.
