= Jamie Burke =

American baseball player (born 1971)

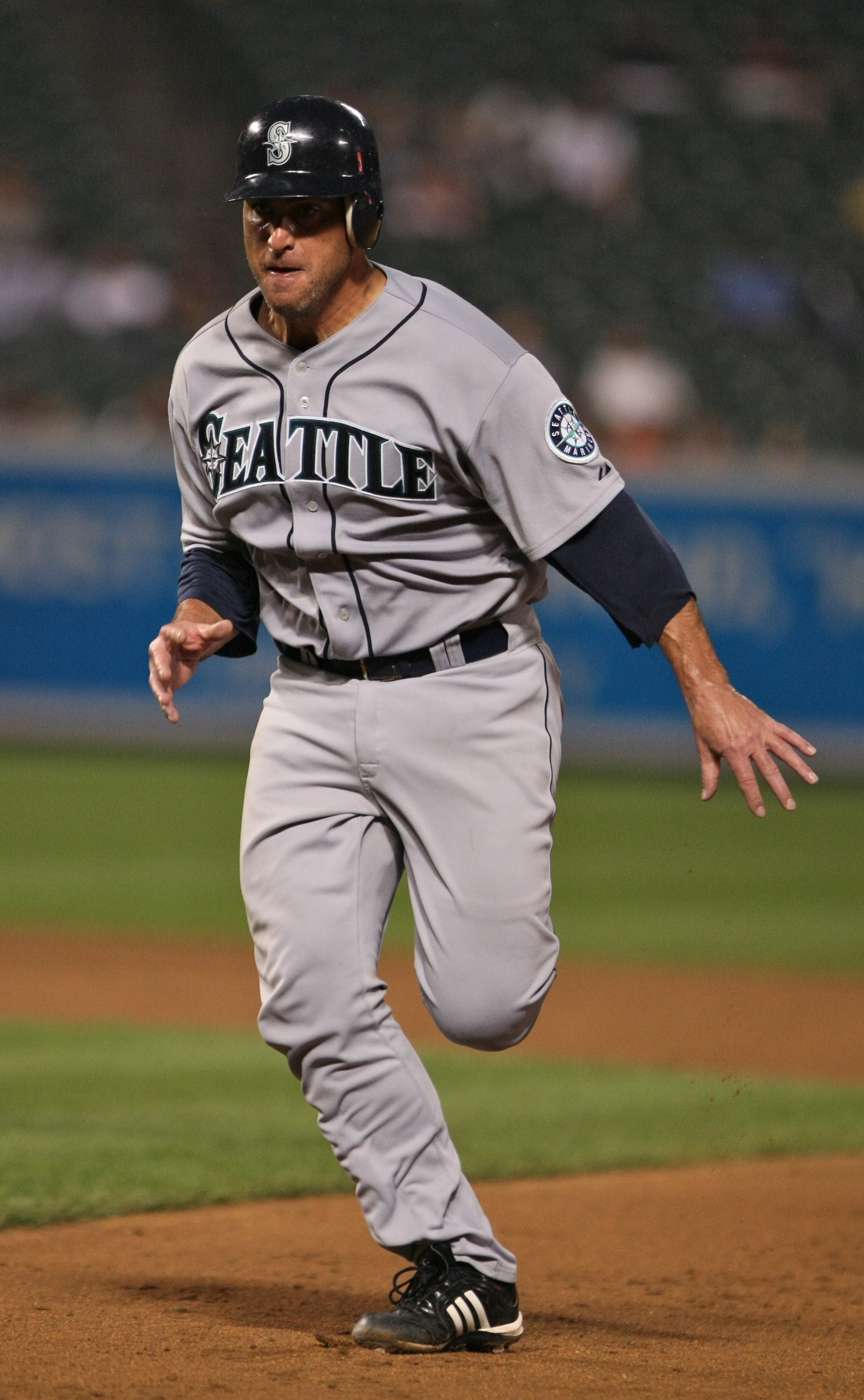
- Burke with the Seattle Mariners
- Catcher
- Born: September 24, 1971 (age 54); Roseburg, Oregon, U.S.
- Batted: Right Threw: Right

MLB debut
- May 9, 2001, for the Anaheim Angels

Last MLB appearance
- June 6, 2010, for the Washington Nationals

MLB statistics
- Batting average: .277
- Home runs: 3
- Runs batted in: 39
- Stats at Baseball Reference

Teams
- Anaheim Angels (2001); Chicago White Sox (2003–2005); Seattle Mariners (2007–2009); Washington Nationals (2009–2010)

James Eugene Burke (born September 24, 1971) is an American former Major League Baseball catcher, playing for four teams from 2001 to 2010. He attended Oregon State University, where, along with baseball, he played for the school's football team as the kicker.

== Professional career ==
=== California/Anaheim Angels ===
Burke was drafted by the California Angels in the ninth round of the 1993 amateur draft. He played in the Angels' minor league system for several seasons. He played in nine games for the Anaheim Angels in 2001. He hit a single and scored in his first plate appearance on May 13. He did not start any games and went hitless in his last four at bats with the Angels. Burke returned to Triple-A for the rest of 2001 and all of 2002.

=== Chicago White Sox ===
Burke signed with the Chicago White Sox on January 27, 2003. He played in 6 games in 2003, then a career-high 57 games in 2004, and one game in 2005. In his three seasons, he batted .333 with 9 doubles and 17 RBI.

=== Texas Rangers ===
The Texas Rangers signed Burke to a minor league deal on November 7, 2005. He did not appear in an MLB game in 2006.

=== Seattle Mariners ===
As a non-roster invitee in the Mariners' camp during spring training in 2007, he beat out incumbent René Rivera for the backup catcher job going into Opening Day. On September 30, on the last day of the regular season, Burke hit his first career home run against A. J. Murray of the Rangers.

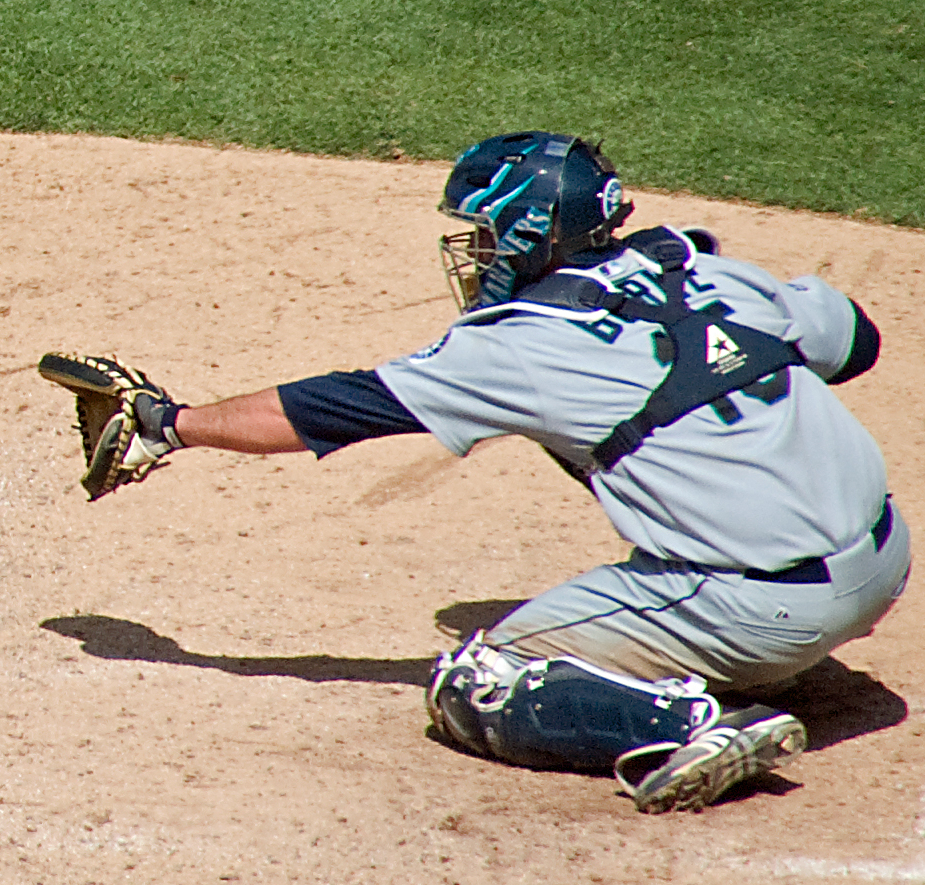
Burke behind the plate for the Mariners against the San Diego Padres

On July 6, 2008, Burke was pressed into service on the pitcher's mound in the 15th inning of a game against Detroit when the Mariners ran out of pitchers; he was credited with the loss. Burke allowed one hit and a run. The run scored after a lead off double, wild pitch, and sacrifice fly. Burke had previously made four pitching appearances in the minor leagues.

Following the 2008 season, Burke was non-tendered by the Mariners, making him a free agent. He was re-signed by the Mariners to a minor league contract on December 23, saying this about the situation,

The best gift would have been a major-league deal, but I'm pretty happy about this. This is a place I wanted to be. It's a situation I like and one that I think could work out very well.

Burke was added to the active roster on April 16, 2009, following an injury to starting catcher Kenji Johjima. When Johjima returned from the disabled list on May 1, Burke was outrighted back to the Triple-A Tacoma Rainiers; after clearing waivers, he accepted the assignment. On June 7, Burke was recalled up from Tacoma after the Mariners designated pitcher Denny Stark for assignment. In a winning effort that day, Burke went 2-for-5 with a home run.

On June 26, Johjima was activated from the disabled list. To make room for Johjima on the 25-man roster, the Mariners designated Burke for assignment. He accepted an assignment to Tacoma.

=== Washington Nationals ===
On September 17, 2009 Burke was traded to the Washington Nationals for cash considerations and was added to the Nats' active roster as a September call-up. The following year, his knee was injured, and he did not play his first game at the Nationals' Triple-A affiliate Syracuse until May 25. But after injuries to starter Iván Rodríguez and backup catcher Carlos Maldonado, he was called up on June 4, and got into his first game two days later. However, four days later, Burke was designated for assignment after making only one appearance to make way for Rodríguez, who was recalled from his rehab assignment in the minors.

== Post-playing career ==
Burke retired after the 2010 season and became the manager of the Class A Cedar Rapids Kernels in 2012. He was named manager of the Class A Burlington Bees in 2013. He was replaced by Bill Richardson in 2014.

Burke retired to Oregon. He received his teaching degree in 2024. He teaches physical education in the Oakland, Oregon School District and coaches high school baseball and middle school football.

== Personal life ==
Burke is divorced and has three children.

Burke earned his degree from Oregon State University in 2005.
