= Outman =

Outman is a German surname. Notable people with the surname include:

- James Outman (born 1997), American baseball player
- Josh Outman (born 1984), American baseball pitcher
- Pat Outman (born c. 1992), American politician
- Rick Outman (born 1963), American politician
