= César Jiménez (baseball) =

Venezuelan baseball player (born 1984)

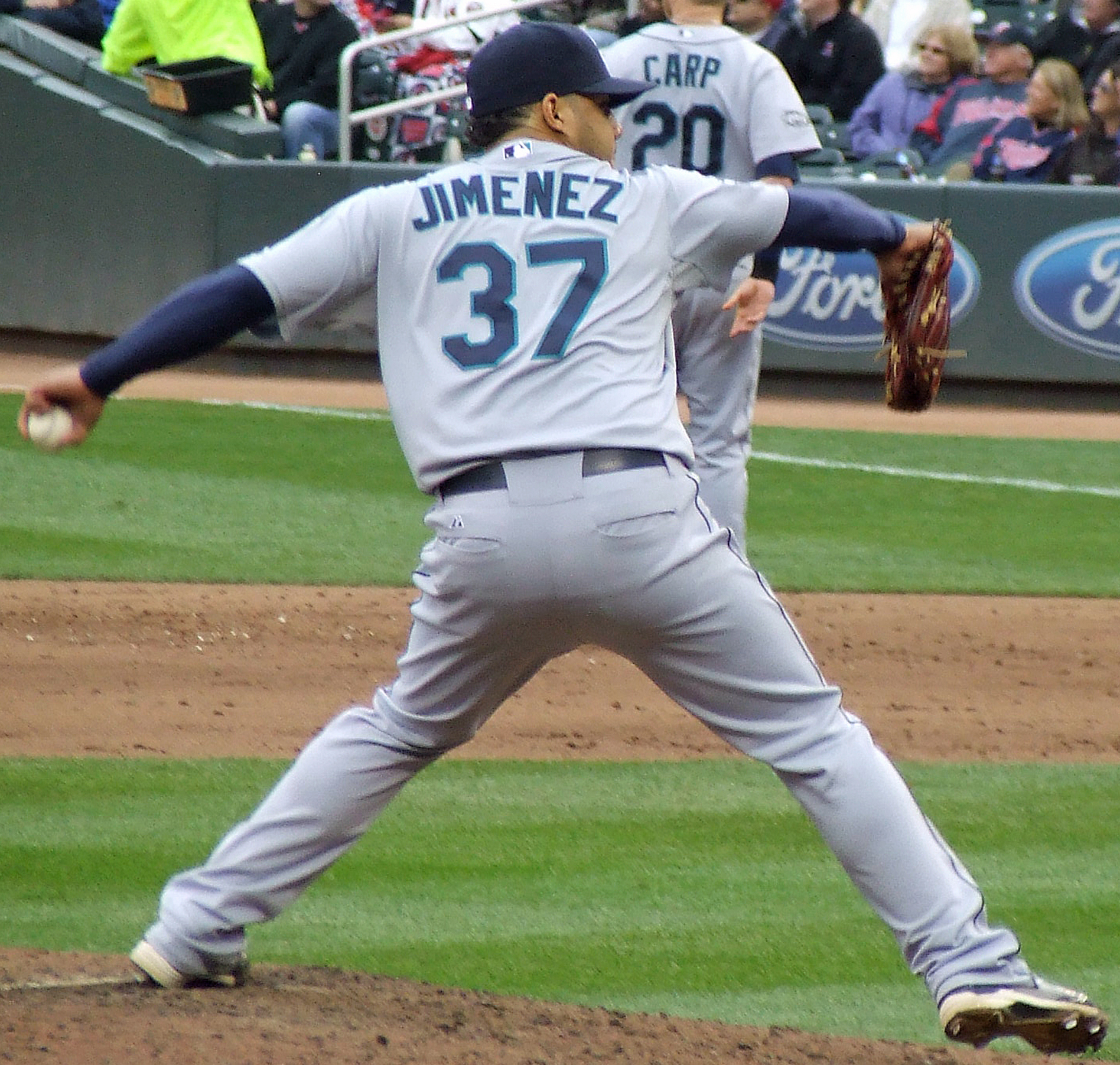
- Jiménez with the Seattle Mariners in 2011
- Pitcher
- Born: November 12, 1984 (age 41); Cumaná, Sucre, Venezuela
- Batted: Left Threw: Left

MLB debut
- September 11, 2006, for the Seattle Mariners

Last MLB appearance
- October 1, 2015, for the Milwaukee Brewers

MLB statistics
- Win–loss record: 2–3
- Earned run average: 4.05
- Strikeouts: 80
- Stats at Baseball Reference

Teams
- Seattle Mariners (2006, 2008, 2011); Philadelphia Phillies (2013–2015); Milwaukee Brewers (2015)

César Enrique Jiménez (born November 12, 1984) is a Venezuelan former professional baseball pitcher. He played in Major League Baseball (MLB) for the Seattle Mariners and Philadelphia Phillies.

== Professional career ==
=== Seattle Mariners ===
Jiménez was signed as a non-drafted free agent on July 2, 2001; he was signed by Mariners scout Emilio Carrasquel. That year, he took part in the Mariners Fall Instructional League.

In 2002, he excelled being named Dominican Team's Most Valuable Pitcher by the Mariners organization, he went 7–1 with a 0.83 earned run average in 65.1 innings of work. He was with Peoria where launched a single game, going without decision with 3.38 ERA, striking out three in 2.2 innings pitched. At the same time launched for Everett, taking eight appearances relief as leaving a combined 2–1 with 2.70 ERA, striking out 25 in 20 innings pitched. At the end of the season, he participated in the 2002 Arizona Instructional League.

He appeared in 28 games (20 starts) for the Wisconsin Timber Rattlers in 2003 and won three consecutive starts twice. Cesar went 3–0 with a 0.49 ERA and 17 strikeouts in eight relief appearances for Wisconsin and he was named to the Midwest League All-Star Team. Played for Lara in the Venezuelan Winter League.

Jiménez struck out 81 batters in 86.1 innings during the 2004 season playing for the Inland Empire 66ers. Jiménez held opponents to a .242 batting average.

He started the 2005 season with San Antonio, going 3–5, with a 2.62 ERA with four saves on the season and team-high 45 games. He allowed just three home runs in 68.2 innings of work and appeared in four games in relief with Tacoma from July 7–19. He allowed eight runs in 7.2 innings pitched. On the disabled list from July 26-August 2 with a tendinitis of the left biceps, he came back from his DL stint to post a 1–1 record, 2.00 ERA in 18.0 innings in 10 August appearances.

In 2006, he started with the Missions for the second season in a row, but was soon called up to the Tacoma Rainiers. He tossed a complete game, one-hitter on June 28, the first Tacoma pitcher with a one-hitter since Derek Lowe on August 16, 2006. He was called up to Seattle on September 11, where he made four appearances and had a 14.73 ERA. He allowed 13 hits over 7 1/3 innings. Jimenez allowed five runs in his only start September 25 against the Oakland Athletics.

Jiménez opened the 2007 season on the 60-day disabled list with a fracture of the left elbow. He was re-instated from the DL on July 9 and optioned to Triple-A Tacoma where he went 2–1 with 2 saves and a 3.51 ERA.

He started out in Tacoma in 2008, going 1–3 with a 3.55 ERA and three saves; he was called up on July 1 and made 31 appearances going 0–2 with a 3.41 ERA in 34.1 innings striking out 26.

Jiménez made his 2009 debut on April 24 with Tacoma, where he made 4 appearances before going on the disabled list in early May. After making 5 rehab appearances with the AZL Mainers, he returned to Tacoma on July 8, where he made 4 more appearances before going on the disabled list. In 13 games in 2009, he went 0–2 with a 3.95 ERA, striking out 13 in 13.2 innings.

Jiménez made his 2010 debut on July 30 in the Arizona League, where he made 3 appearances before joining Double-A West Tenn, where he made 7 appearances to finish the season. In 10 games in 2010, he went 1–0 with a 0.60 ERA, striking out 17 in 15 innings.

Jiménez pitched in his most games since 2008 in 2011. He opened the season with Tacoma, where he made 43 appearances. He went 5–4 with a 4.06 ERA, striking out 81 in 71 innings, placing 10th in the league in strikeouts per innings pitched. On September 1, Jiménez was called up to Seattle after the rosters expanded. In 8 games with Seattle, he went 1–0 with a 5.40 ERA, striking out 7 in 6.2 innings. He was sent outright to Triple-A Tacoma Rainiers on March 22, 2012.

Jiménez opened 2012 in Tacoma, where he pitched in 19 games before going on the disabled list on June 18. After making 3 rehab appearances in the Arizona League, he returned to Tacoma on August 24. In 26 games, he went 2–2 with a 5.24 ERA, striking out 44 in 44.2 innings. After the season, Jiménez became a minor league free agent.

=== Philadelphia Phillies ===
In December 2012, Jiménez signed a minor league contract with the Philadelphia Phillies. He began the year in Triple-A Lehigh Valley, where he pitched in 36 games before earning a promotion to Philadelphia. He went 4–2 with a 3.12 ERA and 3 saves with the IronPigs, striking out 64 in 66.1 innings. On August 6, Jiménez was called up to replace the suspended Antonio Bastardo. Jiménez finished the season with Philadelphia. In 19 games with the Phillies, he went 1–1 with a 3.71 ERA, striking out 11 in 17 innings. On October 16, Jiménez was outrighted off the 40-man roster, and he elected minor league free agency.

On November 16, Jiménez signed a minor league deal with Philadelphia that included an invitation to spring training. He was designated for assignment on June 6, 2014. He was called back up by the Phillies on August 1, 2014. Jiménez signed a new one-year deal with the Phillies on October 23, 2014 He was designated for assignment by the Phillies on April 12, 2015. He was later called back up and designated for assignment again in August.

=== Milwaukee Brewers ===
Jiménez was claimed off waivers by the Milwaukee Brewers on August 21, 2015. In 16 appearances for Milwaukee, he compiled a 3.66 ERA with 21 strikeouts across 19 2/3 innings pitched. On November 2, Jiménez was removed from the 40–man roster and sent outright to the Triple–A Colorado Springs Sky Sox, after which he elected free agency.

Jiménez re-signed with Milwaukee on a new minor league contract with an invitation to spring training on January 22, 2016.

=== Rimini Baseball Club ===
Jimenéz signed with the Rimini Baseball Club of the Italian Baseball League for the 2016 season. He became a free agent following the season without appearing in a game.

=== Nettuno Baseball Club ===
Jimenéz signed with the Nettuno Baseball Club of the Italian Baseball League for the 2017 season. He became a free agent following the season. In 9 games (2 starts) 31.2 innings he went 1–0 with a 1.71 ERA with 47 strikeouts and 2 saves.

=== T&A San Marino ===
Jiménez signed with the T&A San Marino of the Italian Baseball League for the 2018 season. He became a free agent following the season. In 17 games (8 starts) 51.2 innings he went 3–3 with a 2.79 ERA with 73 strikeouts and 2 saves.

=== Generales de Durango ===
On May 14, 2019, Jiménez signed with the Generales de Durango of the Mexican League. He was released on June 1, 2019. In 4 games (3 starts) 7 innings he struggled immensely going 0–3 with a 18.00 ERA and 5 strikeouts.

== Coaching career ==
On January 15, 2024, Jiménez was named pitching coach for the Miami Marlins Dominican Summer League affiliate DSL Marlins for the 2024 season.

== See also ==
- List of Major League Baseball players from Venezuela
