= Tug Hulett =

American baseball player (born 1983)

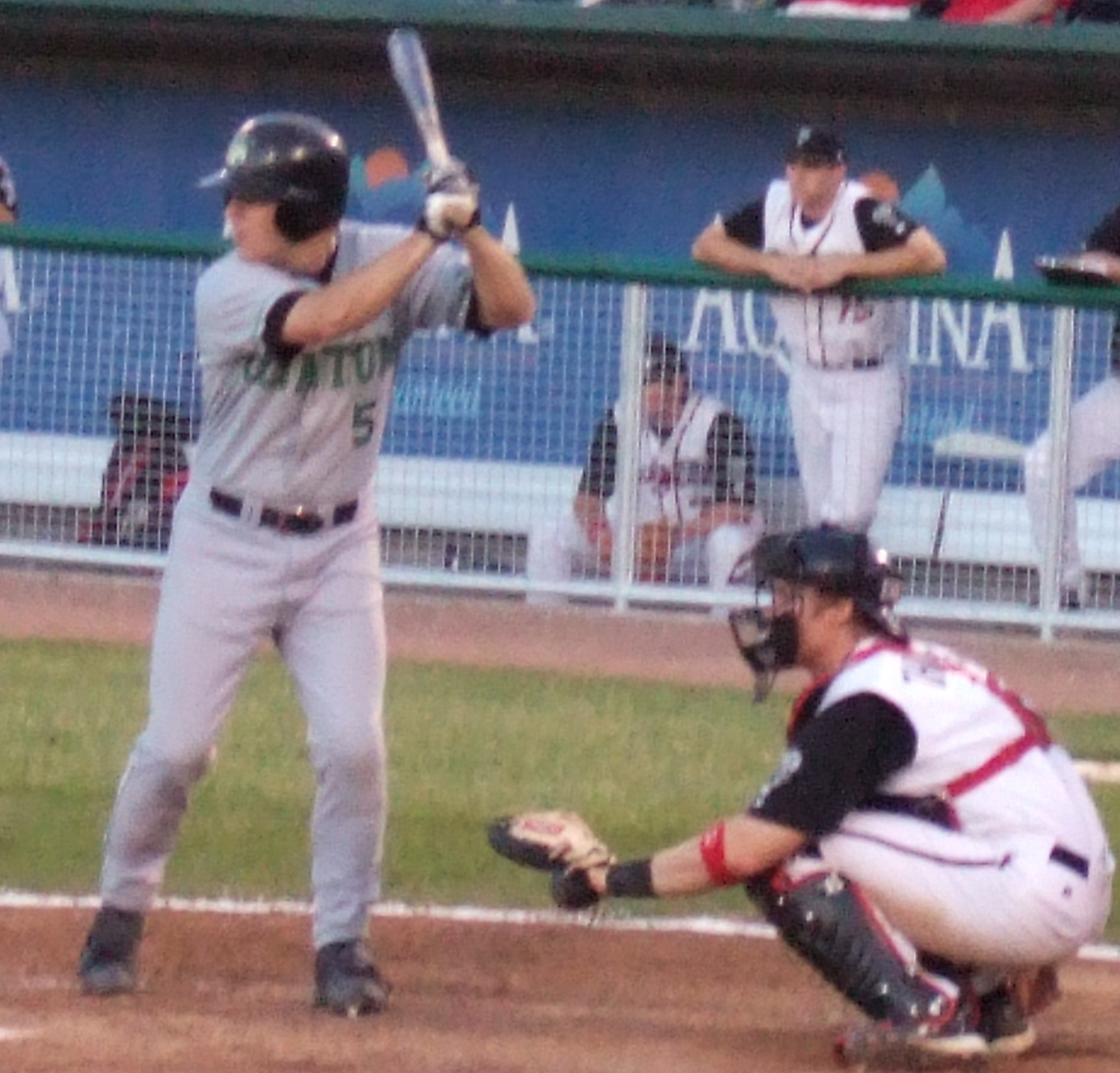
- Hulett (left) with the Clinton LumberKings in 2005
- Second baseman
- Born: February 28, 1983 (age 43); Springfield, Illinois, U.S.
- Batted: Left Threw: Right

MLB debut
- July 12, 2008, for the Seattle Mariners

Last MLB appearance
- October 4, 2009, for the Kansas City Royals

MLB statistics
- Batting average: .194
- Home runs: 1
- Runs batted in: 3
- Stats at Baseball Reference

Teams
- Seattle Mariners (2008); Kansas City Royals (2009)

Tug Hulett
Medal record

Men's baseball

Representing United States

Baseball World Cup
Gold medal – first place	2009 Nettuno	Team

Timothy Craig "Tug" Hulett Jr. (born February 28, 1983) is an American former professional baseball second baseman. He played in Major League Baseball (MLB) for the Seattle Mariners and the Kansas City Royals.

== Early life ==
Hulett was born on February 28, 1983, in Springfield, Illinois. In 1998, his family moved to Shreveport, Louisiana, where he spent the rest of his childhood. Hulett played high school baseball at Evangel Christian Academy in Shreveport. After high school, he played college baseball for the Auburn University Tigers.

== Career ==
A .332 hitter for Auburn University, he played collegiate summer baseball with the Harwich Mariners of the Cape Cod Baseball League in 2003. Hulett was drafted by the Texas Rangers in the 14th round of the 2004 Major League Baseball draft. Hulett hit .274 in 70 games for the Single-A Spokane Indians in 2004. In 2005, he was promoted to the Single-A Clinton LumberKings, where he batted .265 and was a mid-season All-Star. He started 2006 in Single-A Bakersfield before being promoted to the Double-A Frisco RoughRiders. He played for the Oklahoma RedHawks in 2007, hitting .272 in 132 games. On December 12, 2007, he was traded to the Seattle Mariners for Ben Broussard.

Hulett started 2008 with Triple-A Tacoma. After batting .302 in 71 games, Hulett was called up by the Mariners on July 10, after the release of struggling first baseman Richie Sexson. Hulett played one game in Seattle, going 1 for 3, before being sent back down to the Rainiers on July 18 when the Mariners called up first baseman Bryan LaHair.

On February 15, 2009, Hulett was designated for assignment to make room for newly claimed pitcher Luis Peña from the Milwaukee Brewers; he was claimed by the Kansas City Royals four days later.

On November 25, 2009, Hulett was traded to the Boston Red Sox for a player to be named later or cash considerations. On August 8, 2010, the Red Sox released him.

On August 15, 2010, he signed a minor league deal with the Seattle Mariners and was assigned to the Triple-A Tacoma Rainiers.

On December 23, 2010, Hulett signed a minor league contract with the Colorado Rockies. He was released on April 7, 2011.

On April 23, 2011, Hulett signed a minor league contract with the Washington Nationals and was assigned to the Triple-A Syracuse Chiefs.

Hulett opened the 2012 season with Double-A Reading.

He signed with the Miami Marlins on a minor league contract in January 2013, but was released before the season started.

== Personal life ==
His father Tim played 12 seasons in Major League Baseball for the Chicago White Sox, Baltimore Orioles, and St. Louis Cardinals.

== See also ==
- List of second-generation Major League Baseball players
