= Ryan Feierabend =

American baseball player (born 1985)

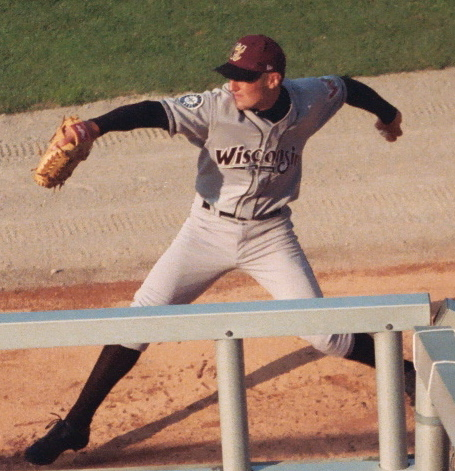
- Feierabend with the Wisconsin Timber Rattlers
- Pitcher
- Born: August 22, 1985 (age 41); Cleveland, Ohio, U.S.
- Batted: Left Threw: Left

Professional debut
- MLB: September 13, 2006, for the Seattle Mariners
- KBO: April 1, 2015, for the Nexen Heroes
- CPBL: April 12, 2020, for the Uni-President Lions

Last appearance
- MLB: May 23, 2019, for the Toronto Blue Jays
- KBO: October 8, 2018, for the KT Wiz
- CPBL: June 27, 2020, for the Uni-President Lions

MLB statistics
- Win–loss record: 2–12
- Earned run average: 7.34
- Strikeouts: 72

KBO statistics
- Win–loss record: 36–42
- Earned run average: 4.14
- Strikeouts: 554

CPBL statistics
- Win–loss record: 2–3
- Earned run average: 4.74
- Strikeouts: 55
- Stats at Baseball Reference

Teams
- Seattle Mariners (2006–2008); Texas Rangers (2014); Nexen Heroes (2015–2016); KT Wiz (2016–2018); Toronto Blue Jays (2019); Uni-President Lions (2020)

Career highlights and awards
- KBO ERA leader (2017)

Ryan Robert Feierabend (born August 22, 1985) is an American former professional baseball pitcher. He played in Major League Baseball for the Seattle Mariners, Texas Rangers, and Toronto Blue Jays. Feierabend also played in the KBO League for the Nexen Heroes and KT Wiz, and in the Chinese Professional Baseball League (CPBL) for the Uni-President Lions.

Feierabend was selected in the third round (86th overall) by the Mariners in the 2003 Major League Baseball draft out of Midview High School in Grafton, Ohio.

== Professional career ==
=== Seattle Mariners ===
==== 2006 ====
Feierabend was 9–12 with a 4.28 earned run average in 28 starts for the Double-A San Antonio Missions.

Feierabend was recalled from San Antonio on September 8, 2006. He threw six scoreless innings over his first two major league appearances before making his first start on September 24 against the Chicago White Sox, where he picked up a loss. He allowed two runs in five innings in his second start on September 29 against the Texas Rangers. He ended the season with a 3.71 earned run average (ERA) in 17 innings.

==== 2007 ====
Feierabend started 2007 with the Triple-A Tacoma Rainiers but had four separate stints with the Mariners. He was recalled from Tacoma on May 29 and made season debut that night in start against the Los Angeles Angels. He picked up his first career win and only win of the season on June 3 against the Rangers, allowing 4 runs on 7 hits while striking out 5 in a career-high 7 2/3 innings. He was optioned back to Tacoma the next day. He was recalled on July 24 and started game one of a doubleheader at Texas recording the loss allowing two runs on six hits in five innings. He was optioned back to Tacoma between doubleheader games. He was recalled for fourth time on September 1, appearing in five games, including two starts to end the season. He was 1–6 with a 10.27 earned run average in 9 starts and had 0.77 earned run average in four relief appearances for the Mariners.

==== 2008 ====
Feierabend again started the season in Tacoma but finished the season with the Mariners, where he made 8 starts. He was named the Mariners' Triple-A Pitcher of the Year at the end of the season.

Feierabend spent majority of the season with Tacoma, going 7–1 with a 2.16 in 13 starts. He struck out a season-high seven batters in six innings in first start of the season on April 3 against the Sacramento River Cats. He went 3–0 with a 1.49 earned run average in seven starts at Cheney Stadium. He was placed on the minor league disabled list with a left elbow strain from May 17 to July 24, marking the first time in his career that he was on the disabled list. He made four rehab appearances with the Peoria Mariners and the Everett AquaSox.

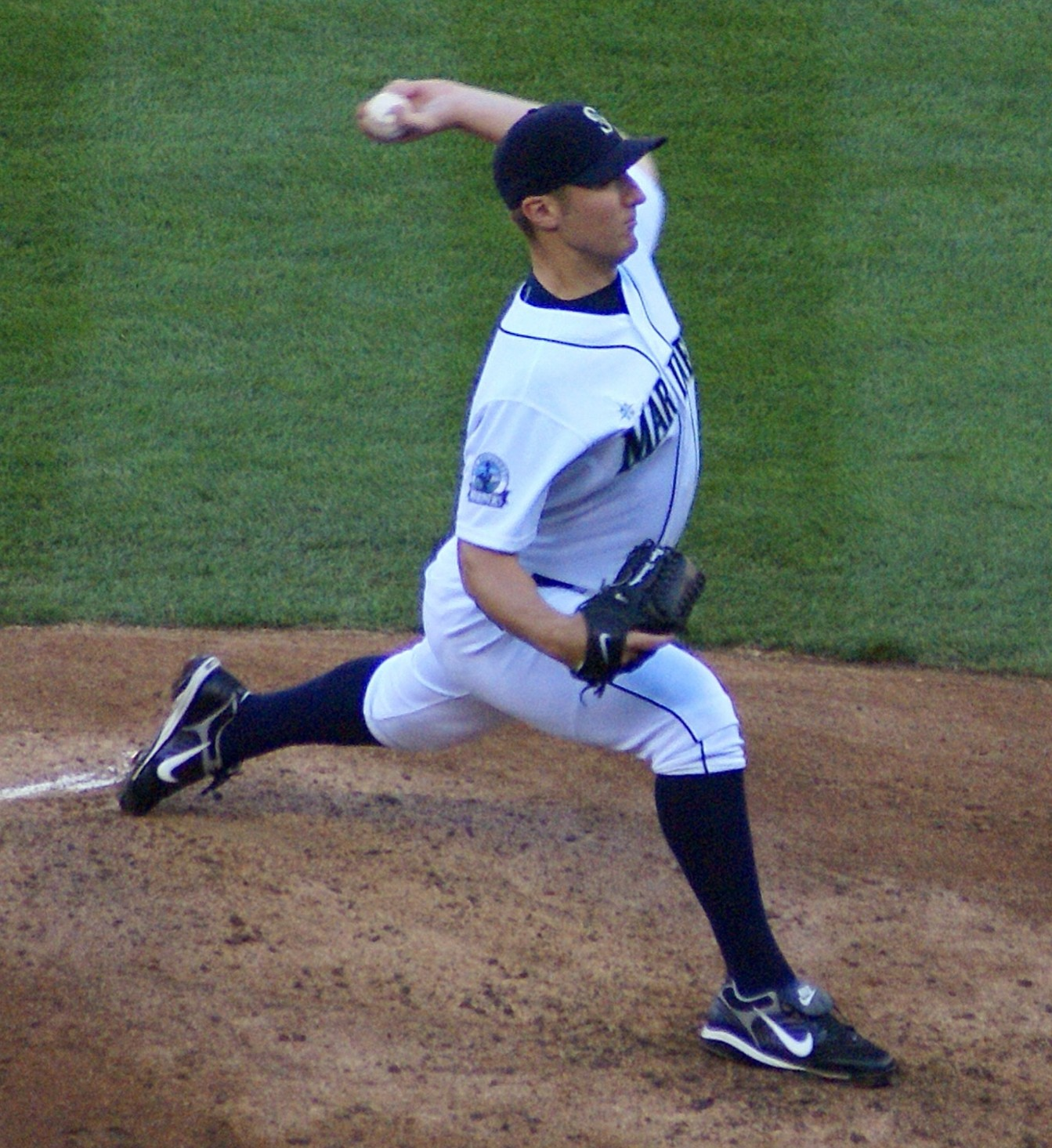
Feierabend pitching for the Seattle Mariners in 2007

On August 17, he was recalled to Seattle and recorded the loss in season debut against the Minnesota Twins, allowing six runs on ten hits in three innings. He picked up only win of the season and final win of his MLB career on September 7 against the New York Yankees. He led the Mariners and was tied for fifth in the American League with six pickoffs, despite only tossing 39 2/3 innings.

=== 2009 and 2010 ===
Feierabend underwent left elbow surgery which forced him to miss the entire 2009 season on March 15. He returned in 2010 to pitch in 25 games over three minor league levels. On November 6, Feierabend elected free agency.

=== Philadelphia Phillies ===
On November 19, 2010, Feierabend signed with the Philadelphia Phillies that included an invitation to spring training. In 28 games (23 starts) for the Triple–A Lehigh Valley IronPigs in 2011, he compiled a 10–8 record and 5.39 ERA with 92 strikeouts across 132 innings pitched. On November 2, 2011, he elected free agency, but he re–signed with the Phillies organization before being released prior to the season on March 18, 2012.

=== York Revolution/Cincinnati Reds ===
Feierabend pitched for the York Revolution of the independent Atlantic League of Professional Baseball starting in April 2012. He later signed with the Cincinnati Reds organization on June 6, 2012. He struggled to a 6.75 ERA in 7 starts for the Triple–A Louisville Bats before he was released on July 21, after which he returned to York.

=== Texas Rangers ===
Feierabend was signed to a minor league contract by the Texas Rangers on January 15, 2013, that included an invitation to spring training. In 29 games (21 starts) split between the Double–A Frisco RoughRiders and Triple–A Round Rock Express, he accumulated a 7–7 record and 3.70 ERA with 101 strikeouts across 148 1/3 innings pitched. On December 20, Feierabend re–signed with the Rangers organization on a new minor league contract.

On July 12, 2014, the Rangers selected Feierabend's contract, adding him to their active roster. He made six relief appearances with the Rangers, giving up five runs in 7 1/3 innings. Feierabend was designated for assignment by Texas on August 1. He cleared waivers and was sent outright to Round Rock on August 4. Feierabend elected free agency in October 2014.

=== Nexen Heroes ===
On December 3, 2014, Feierabend signed a one-year, $270,000 contract to play for the Nexen Heroes of the KBO League. In his first KBO season in 2015, he went 13–11 with a 4.67 ERA and 137 strikeouts in 30 starts.

=== KT Wiz ===
After being released mid-season by the Heroes in 2016, Feierabend signed with the KBO's KT Wiz. He re-signed with the team for the 2017 and 2018 seasons and became a free agent following the 2018 season. Beginning in 2017, Feierabend began throwing a knuckleball consistently as part of his pitching arsenal.

=== Toronto Blue Jays ===
On February 14, 2019, Feierabend signed a minor league contract with the Toronto Blue Jays. On May 18, he was called up to the major league roster. That same day, he pitched the Blue Jays' only complete game of the season in a 4–1 loss to the Chicago White Sox. The game was called due to rain after the top of the fifth, with Feierabend having pitched four innings. He made one more appearance, giving up 3 earned runs in 1 2/3 innings in his final MLB game on May 23. He was designated for assignment on May 24, cleared waivers, and was assigned outright to the Triple-A Buffalo Bisons. He elected free agency following the 2019 season.

=== Uni-President Lions ===
On January 31, 2020, Feierabend signed with the Uni-President Lions of the Chinese Professional Baseball League. On June 26, the Lions announced that the organization and Feierabend would officially part ways effective July 1, as he wished to be with his family during the COVID-19 pandemic and didn't agree to the terms of a proposed contract extension.

=== Lake Erie Crushers ===
On April 8, 2021, Feierabend signed with the Lake Erie Crushers of the Frontier League. In 93 1/3 innings pitched across 18 games, Feierabend posted an 8–5 record and 2.80 ERA while striking out 100 batters. On September 6, Feierabend announced his retirement from professional baseball.

== Coaching career ==
On February 11, 2025, the Miami Marlins hired Feierabend to serve as the pitching coach of their Single-A affiliate, the Jupiter Hammerheads.
