= Bryan LaHair =

American baseball player (born 1982)

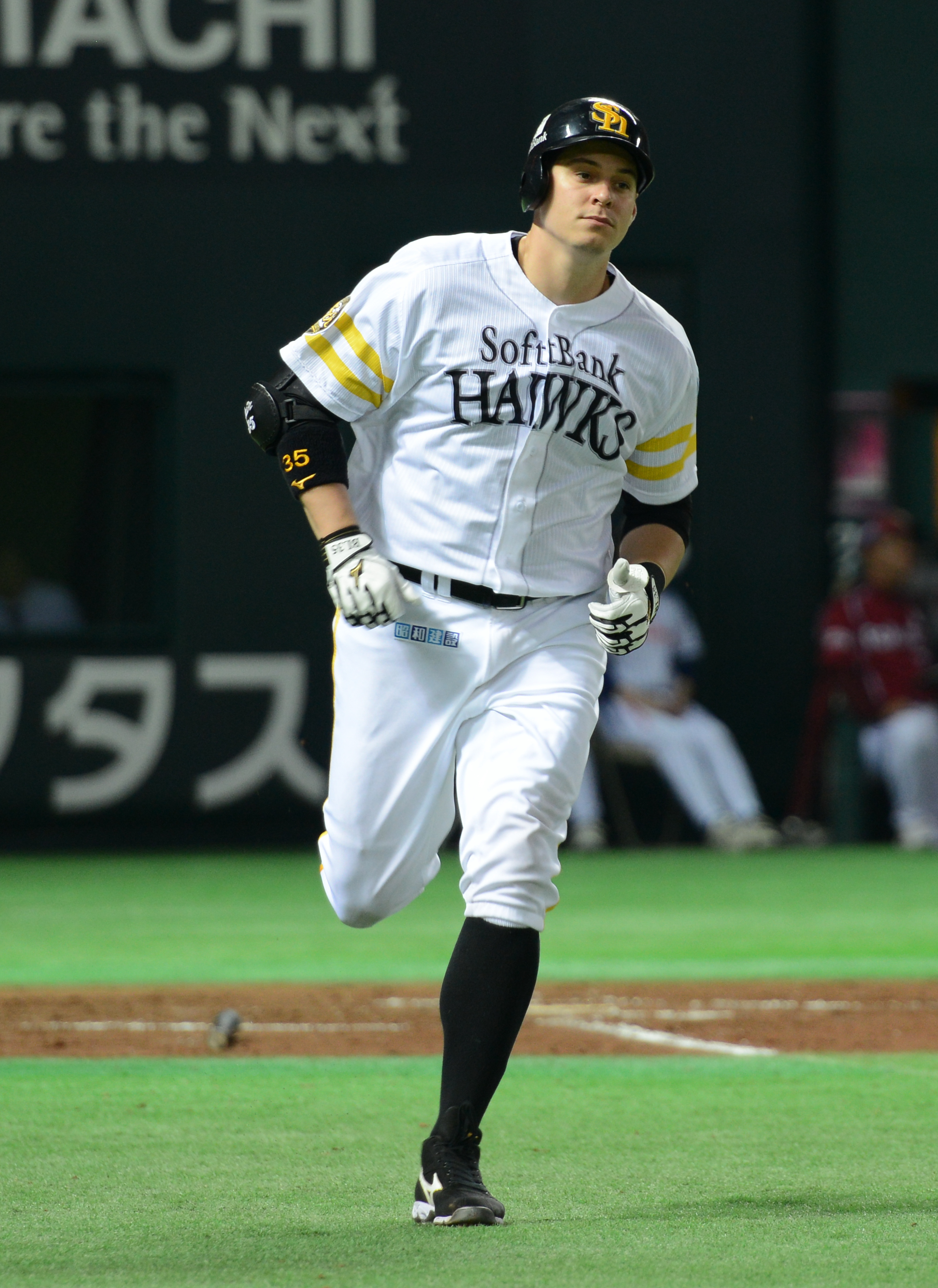
- LaHair with the Fukuoka SoftBank Hawks in 2013
- First baseman
- Born: November 5, 1982 (age 43); Worcester, Massachusetts, U.S.
- Batted: Left Threw: Right

Professional debut
- MLB: July 18, 2008, for the Seattle Mariners
- NPB: March 29, 2013, for the Fukuoka SoftBank Hawks

Last appearance
- MLB: October 3, 2012, for the Chicago Cubs
- NPB: September 10, 2013, for the Fukuoka SoftBank Hawks

MLB statistics
- Batting average: .260
- Home runs: 21
- Runs batted in: 56

NPB statistics
- Batting average: .230
- Home runs: 16
- Runs batted in: 57
- Stats at Baseball Reference

Teams
- Seattle Mariners (2008); Chicago Cubs (2011–2012); Fukuoka SoftBank Hawks (2013)

Career highlights and awards
- All-Star (2012); Pacific Coast League MVP (2011)

Bryan Allan LaHair (born November 5, 1982) is an American former professional baseball first baseman. He has played in Major League Baseball (MLB) for the Seattle Mariners and Chicago Cubs and in Nippon Professional Baseball (NPB) for the Fukuoka SoftBank Hawks.

== Professional career ==
=== Seattle Mariners ===
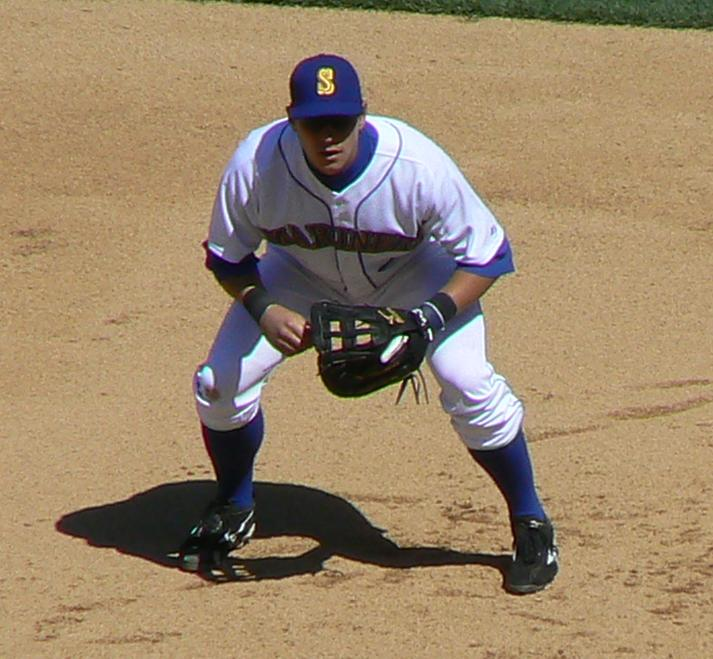
LaHair playing for the Seattle Mariners in 2008

LaHair was selected by the Mariners in the 39th round of the 2002 Major League Baseball draft out of Saint Petersburg College.

LaHair spent the 2005 season with the Inland Empire 66ers, the Mariners' Single-A affiliate at the time, where he hit .310 with 22 home runs and 113 RBI, earning a spot in the California/Carolina League All-Star Game.

For 2006, LaHair was promoted to the Double-A San Antonio Missions and later to the Triple-A Tacoma Rainiers. In November 2006, he was placed on the Mariners' 40-man roster.

After playing the entire 2007 season in Triple-A, batting .275 with 12 home runs, LaHair started the 2008 season with the Rainiers. In July 2008, he was called up to the Mariners shortly after the release of first baseman Richie Sexson. The Mariners had called up infielder Tug Hulett directly following Sexson's departure, but sent him back down to make room for LaHair a week later. He made his Major League debut on July 18, 2008, as a pinch hitter, grounding into a double play. His first Major League Baseball hit was a line drive single to right field against the Boston Red Sox.

=== Chicago Cubs ===
On January 9, 2010, LaHair signed a minor league contract with the Chicago Cubs with an invite to spring training.

With the Triple-A Iowa Cubs, LaHair won the Pacific Coast League Most Valuable Player Award and Joe Bauman Home Run Award in 2011. He was named the designated hitter on Baseball America's 2011 Minor League All Star team.

He earned a promotion to the Cubs major-league roster in September 2011, and in his debut for the team on September 4, recorded his first Cubs hit, a single off the Pittsburgh Pirates' Charlie Morton.

Prior to the 2012 season, Cubs manager Dale Sveum released a statement saying that Anthony Rizzo would start the season in Triple-A Iowa, making LaHair the everyday first baseman. Following Rizzo's callup to the majors, LaHair was moved to right field. On July 1, 2012, Lahair, who then was hitting .284 with 13 home runs and 28 RBI, was named to the NL All-Star team as a reserve at first base.

On Dec. 23, 2019, LaHair was named to The Athletic Chicago's all-decade second team by columnist Andy Dolan.

=== Fukuoka SoftBank Hawks ===
On November 22, 2012, the Fukuoka SoftBank Hawks said that they signed LaHair to a two-year, $4.5 million contract. LaHair can opt out of the deal after 2013, and the deal is worth $5.2 million when the signing bonus and buyout are added. The deal has $2 million in incentives each year, and the Cubs received $950,000 in the deal.

=== Cleveland Indians ===
He signed a minor league contract with the Cleveland Indians on February 5, 2014.

=== Boston Red Sox ===
In 2015, LaHair signed a minor league contract with the Boston Red Sox. He was released on April 4.

=== Somerset Patriots ===
On February 16, 2016, LaHair signed with the Somerset Patriots of the Atlantic League of Professional Baseball. In 123 games he hit .279/.350/.397 with 10 home runs, 86 RBIs and 1 stolen base.

In 2017, Lahair re-signed with the Patriots for a second season. On November 1, 2017, he became a free agent. In 27 games he struggled hitting .228/.363/.261 with 0 home runs and 4 RBIs.

== Coaching career ==
Bryan LaHair was hired in January 2018 to be the Billings Mustangs hitting coach, the rookie ball affiliate of the Cincinnati Reds.

In 2019, LaHair was named Field Staff Manager of the Billings Mustangs. LaHair managed the team for two seasons.

In 2022, LaHair was named manager of the Dayton Dragons.

LaHair was named as a coach for the Louisville Bats for the 2024 season.

In 2026, he was named as hitting coach for the ACL Reds the Cincinnati Reds rookie-level affiliate.
