= Greg Norton (baseball) =

American baseball player (born 1972)

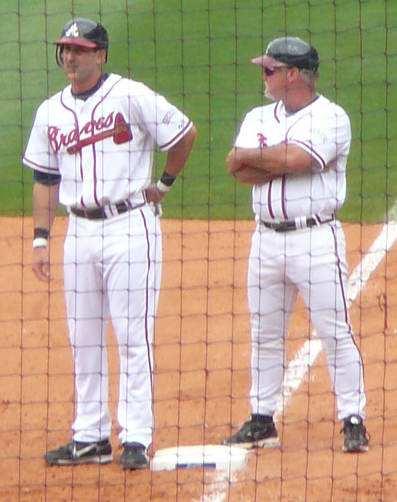
- Norton (left) with the Atlanta Braves in 2008
- Third baseman / First baseman
- Born: July 6, 1972 (age 54); San Leandro, California, U.S.
- Batted: Switch Threw: Right

MLB debut
- August 18, 1996, for the Chicago White Sox

Last MLB appearance
- October 4, 2009, for the Atlanta Braves

MLB statistics
- Batting average: .249
- Home runs: 89
- Runs batted in: 338
- Stats at Baseball Reference

Teams
- Chicago White Sox (1996–2000); Colorado Rockies (2001–2003); Detroit Tigers (2004); Tampa Bay Devil Rays (2006–2007); Seattle Mariners (2008); Atlanta Braves (2008–2009)

Gregory Blakemoor Norton (born July 6, 1972) is an American former professional baseball corner infielder. He spent 13 years in Major League Baseball (MLB) with six teams from 1996 through 2009. Since his retirement as a player, he has worked in the minor league system of the Florida Marlins, served as a coach for Auburn University, and was the minor league hitting coordinator for the Boston Red Sox.

== Early life ==
Born in San Leandro, California, Norton attended the University of Oklahoma. In 1992, he played collegiate summer baseball with the Chatham A's of the Cape Cod Baseball League and was named a league all-star. Norton's father Jerry was arrested and later convicted of murder after the 1989 strangulation death of his wife. Jerry Norton was later sentenced to 25 years to life in prison.

== Professional career ==
=== Chicago White Sox ===
Norton made his major league debut on August 18, 1996 for the Chicago White Sox, entering the game against the Milwaukee Brewers in the eighth inning as a pinch-runner for designated hitter Harold Baines. He would score his first run three batters later on a two-out RBI single by left fielder Tony Phillips. Norton would get his first major league base hit the very next night against the Detroit Tigers, when he singled against reliever José Lima as a pinch-hitter. His most productive year in Chicago came in 1999, when he hit .255 while recording 50 RBI and hitting 16 homers despite splitting playing time at first base with three other players (including slugger Frank Thomas).

=== Colorado Rockies ===
Playing for the Colorado Rockies from the 2001 season until 2003, Norton compiled a .252 batting average in 344 games played. Norton played four positions for the Rockies his first year with the team, including starting at first base for All-Star Todd Helton for the only five games Helton rested that year. In his final year with the Rockies, Norton led the majors in successful pinch hits and pinch-hit RBI. However, he was granted free agency at the end of the 2003 season.

=== Detroit Tigers ===
2004 was a forgettable year for Norton, as he split time with the Detroit Tigers and their minor-league team in Toledo. Tigers first baseman Carlos Peña led the team in home runs that year, leaving very little room for Norton. A knee inflammation also kept him on the disabled list for over a month.

=== Tampa Bay Devil Rays ===
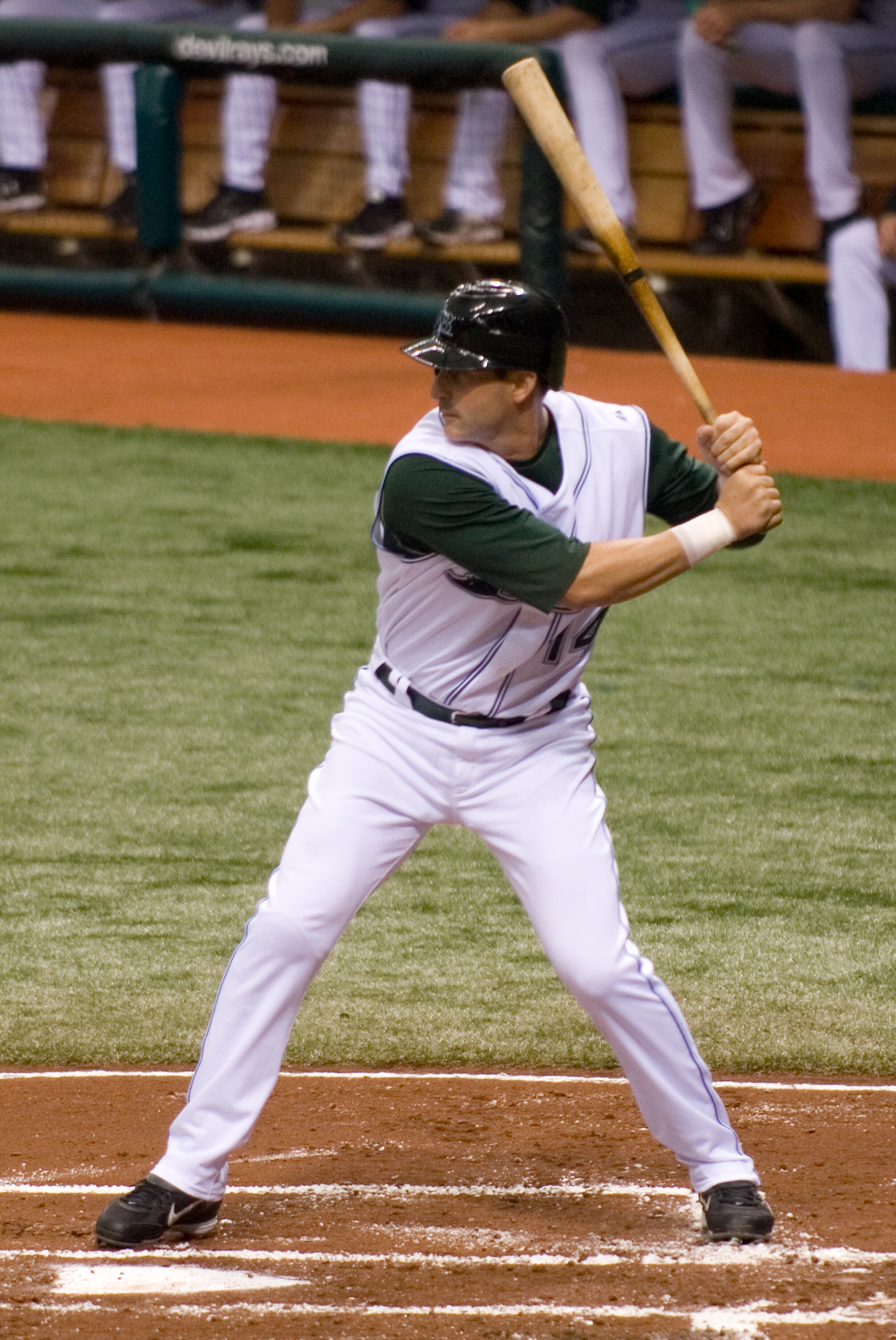
Norton with the Tampa Bay Devil Rays in 2007

On January 11, 2006, Norton signed a minor league contract with the Tampa Bay Devil Rays. He was brought up to the majors on April 26 when Jorge Cantú was placed on the disabled list. In Norton's first year as a D-Ray, he bested his season home run total (17) and started a career high 26 games in right field. He missed making the 2007 Opening Day roster while going under the knife to surgically repair his right knee. On Mother's Day, May 14, 2006, Norton was one of more than 50 hitters who brandished a pink bat to benefit the Breast Cancer Foundation.

=== Seattle Mariners ===
On February 13, 2008, Norton signed a minor league contract with an invitation to spring training with the Seattle Mariners. He was purchased from the minors and added to the active roster on April 11, 2008 when Charlton Jimerson was designated for assignment. On April 30, Norton was designated for assignment despite batting .438 in 16 at-bats.

=== Atlanta Braves ===
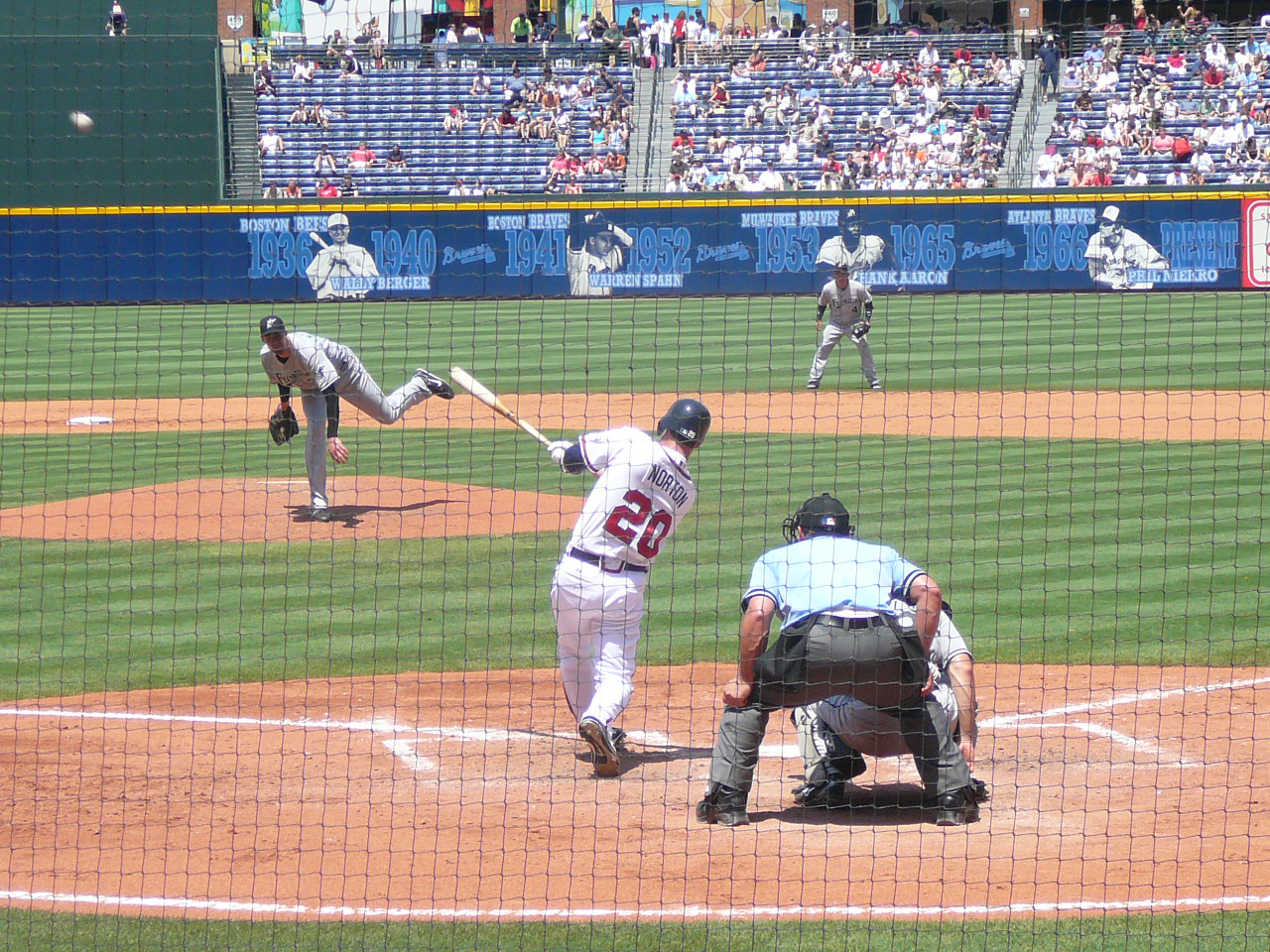
Norton hitting against Mark Hendrickson of the Florida Marlins in 2008

On May 5, Norton was traded to the Atlanta Braves for cash considerations. In 2008, Norton led the major leagues in pinch hit home runs, with three. On December 19, 2008, Norton signed a one-year contract worth $800,000 to return to the Braves. In 2009, he collected only 11 hits in 76 at-bats with Atlanta.

== Coaching career ==
Norton began a coaching career within the Florida Marlins farm system in 2010, acting as hitting coach and then manager of the New Orleans Zephyrs. In July 2013, he was named hitting coach for the Auburn Tigers baseball program. Norton left his position in the Marlins organization to join coach Sunny Golloway at Auburn. In January 2016, Norton was hired by the Boston Red Sox to be the team's minor league hitting coordinator. The Red Sox declined to renew Norton's contract after the 2021 season.
