= Bill Bavasi =

American sports executive

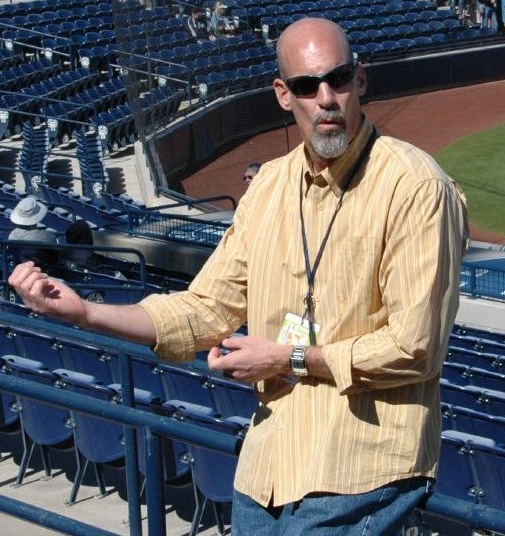
- Bavasi in 2007 with the Seattle Mariners
- Born: William Joseph Bavasi; December 27, 1957 (age 68); Scarsdale, New York, U.S.
- Education: University of San Diego
- Occupation: General Manager
- Organization(s): Anaheim Angels (1994–1999); Seattle Mariners (2003–2008)

William Joseph Bavasi (born December 27, 1957) is an American former Major League Baseball general manager. He currently works as director of the Major League Baseball Scouting Bureau, appointed in November 2014. Bavasi previously served as an assistant to the general manager for the Cincinnati Reds, under Reds general manager Walt Jocketty. The son of longtime MLB executive Buzzie Bavasi and the brother of Peter Bavasi, also a former MLB executive, Bavasi also spent six full seasons (1994–99) as the general manager of the California / Anaheim Angels and a 4 1/2 season stint as general manager of the Seattle Mariners (2003–08).

== California Angels ==
Bavasi is a graduate of University of San Diego. He began his front office baseball career with the Angels, where his father was front office boss from 1977–84. Bill was an administrator in the Angels' minor league department from 1981 to 1982, then held the positions of farm system director and director of player development. On January 12, 1994, Bavasi succeeded Whitey Herzog as the Angels' general manager. He remained in place when the club was sold by Jackie Autry, widow of the team's original owner Gene Autry, to the Walt Disney Company. But late-season collapses plagued the franchise, and Bavasi was succeeded by Bill Stoneman on October 1, 1999.

After leaving the Angels, Bavasi spent two seasons (2002–2003) as player development chief of the Los Angeles Dodgers.

== Seattle Mariners ==
On November 7, 2003, Bavasi was named general manager of the Seattle Mariners. During his tenure, the club had a total record of 322–395 and achieved only one winning season (88–74 in 2007). On June 16, 2008, with the Mariners holding the worst record in the major leagues at 24–45, Bavasi was fired. Mariners chief executive officer Howard Lincoln, who made the announcement, said, "Change is in order. We have determined new leadership is needed in the GM position. With a new leader will come a new plan and a new approach." Mariners vice president and associate general manager Lee Pelekoudas was named to take over in the interim.

Preceded by Whitey Herzog	California/Anaheim Angels General Manager; 1994–99	Succeeded by Bill Stoneman
Preceded by Pat Gillick	Seattle Mariners General Manager; 2003–2008	Succeeded by Lee Pelekoudas
