= José Vidro =

Puerto Rican baseball player (born 1974)

Jose Vidro
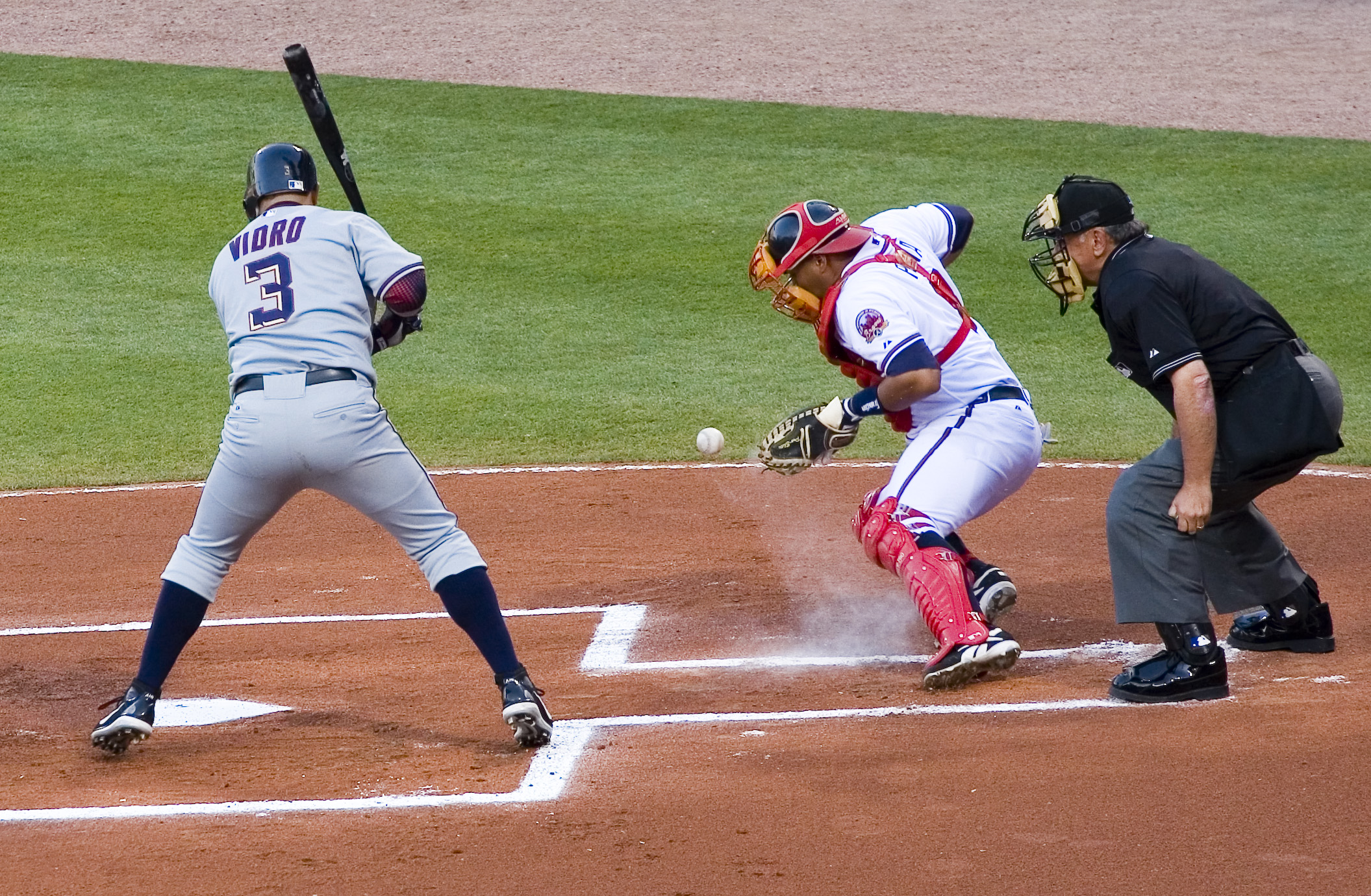
- Vidro with the Washington Nationals
- Second baseman
- Born: August 27, 1974 (age 51); Mayagüez, Puerto Rico
- Batted: Switch Threw: Right

MLB debut
- June 8, 1997, for the Montreal Expos

Last MLB appearance
- August 4, 2008, for the Seattle Mariners

MLB statistics
- Batting average: .298
- Home runs: 128
- Runs batted in: 654
- Stats at Baseball Reference

Teams
- Montreal Expos / Washington Nationals (1997–2006); Seattle Mariners (2007–2008)

Career highlights and awards
- 3× All-Star (2000, 2002, 2003); Silver Slugger Award (2003)

José Angel Vidro (born August 27, 1974) is a Puerto Rican former professional baseball second baseman. He played in Major League Baseball (MLB) for the Montreal Expos/Washington Nationals and Seattle Mariners.

== Professional career ==
=== Montreal Expos/Washington Nationals ===
Vidro was drafted in the sixth round of the 1992 MLB draft by the Montreal Expos from Blanca Malaret High School in Sabana Grande, Puerto Rico. He spent four seasons in the minor leagues before making his major league debut on June 8, 1997. He was primarily a reserve infielder for the Expos in 1997 and 1998. Vidro is the first of three players, including Robinson Cancel (New York Mets) and Jonathan Sánchez (San Francisco Giants), from Sabana Grande to make it to the major leagues.

In 1999, Vidro became a full-time player as the Expos starting second baseman. He hit .304 with 12 home runs and 59 RBI and was second in the National League (NL) with 45 doubles.

In 2000, Vidro was named an All-Star for the first time in his career. His career high .330 batting average on the season was seventh-best in the NL. His 200 hits were second-best in the NL and his 51 doubles were good for third-best. He also set career high numbers with 24 home runs and 97 RBI. Vidro continued as the starting second baseman for the Expos in 2001 when he hit .319 with 15 home runs and 59 RBI.

Vidro made the NL All-Star team in both 2002 and 2003, hitting over .300 both seasons and winning the Silver Slugger as the best hitting second baseman in the NL in 2003. Vidro played three more seasons with the franchise, including the first two seasons when the Expos moved and became the Washington Nationals. Due to injuries to his right knee, ankle, and quadriceps muscle, Vidro played in only 87 games for the Washington Nationals in 2005, 8 of which were as a pinch hitter.

=== Seattle Mariners ===
On December 14, 2006, the Nationals traded Vidro to the Seattle Mariners for outfielder Chris Snelling and pitcher Emiliano Fruto. Vidro spent two seasons with Seattle primarily playing designated hitter. He hit .314 in 147 games in 2007, but hit only six home runs while slugging .394.

On August 5, 2008, the Mariners designated Vidro for assignment, and he was released on August 13. He was hitting .234 with seven home runs and 45 RBI at the time.

=== Career statistics ===
Years	Games	PA	AB	R	H	2B	3B	HR	RBI	BB	SO	AVG	OBP	SLG	FLD%
12	1,418	5708	5,113	720	1,524	341	12	128	654	478	556	.298	.359	.445	.984

Vidro played 1,046 games at second base, 45 games at third base, 42 games at first base and 3 games at left field.
