= Jeff Pentland =

American baseball coach (born 1946)

- Hitting coach
- Born: September 8, 1946 (age 79); Los Angeles, California, U.S.
- Bats: Left Throws: Left
- Stats at Baseball Reference

Teams
- As coach: Florida Marlins (1996); Chicago Cubs (1997–2002); Kansas City Royals (2003–2005); Seattle Mariners (2006–2008); Los Angeles Dodgers (2010–2011); New York Yankees (2015)

Jeffrey William Pentland (born September 8, 1946) is an American baseball coach. He has coached in college baseball and in Major League Baseball (MLB).

== Playing career ==
Pentland attended Arizona State University (ASU) and played college baseball for the Arizona State Sun Devils. As a pitcher for ASU, he had a 32-12 win–loss record in his career and his 2.25 earned run average still ranks as one of the top 10 in ASU history. He was on the 1967 College World Series baseball team. He spent three seasons (1969–71) in the San Diego Padres minor league system, mostly playing first base but also pitching in 29 games.

In 2002, Pentland was inducted into the ASU Hall of Fame.

== Coaching career ==
Pentland worked as an assistant coach at University of California, Riverside, from 1975 through 1982 and at Arizona State from 1983 through 1992. He then joined the minor league coaching staff of the Florida Marlins in 1993 and became their Major League hitting coach for the second half of 1996.

Pentland later worked as the hitting coach for the Chicago Cubs (1997–2002), Kansas City Royals (2003–2006), and Seattle Mariners (2005–2008).

He was hired by the Los Angeles Dodgers in 2008 as a secondary hitting instructor and was promoted to hitting coach in 2010. He was fired on July 20, 2011.

On January 11, 2015, Pentland was hired by the New York Yankees to take over as their hitting coach, replacing long-time hitting coach Kevin Long. The Yankees declined to offer him a contract following the season.

== Personal ==
Pentland resides in Tempe, Arizona.

Preceded by Don Mattingly	Los Angeles Dodgers Hitting Coach; 2011	Succeeded by Dave Hansen
Preceded by Kevin Long	New York Yankees Hitting Coach; 2015	Succeeded by Alan Cockrell
