= 2009 Los Angeles Dodgers season =

2009 Los Angeles Dodgers
- National League West champions
- League: National League
- Division: West
- Ballpark: Dodger Stadium
- City: Los Angeles
- Record: 95–67 (.586)
- Divisional place: 1st
- Owners: Frank McCourt
- President: Dennis Mannion
- General managers: Ned Colletti
- Managers: Joe Torre
- Television: FSN Prime Ticket; KCAL (9); Vin Scully, Eric Collins, Steve Lyons
- Radio: KABC; Vin Scully, Rick Monday, Charley Steiner; KHJ; Jaime Jarrín, Pepe Yñiguez, Fernando Valenzuela

The 2009 Los Angeles Dodgers season was the 120th season for the Los Angeles Dodgers franchise in Major League Baseball (MLB), their 52nd season in Los Angeles, California, and their 48th season playing their home games at Dodger Stadium. The team defended their National League West title while earning the best record in the National League, and marked the 50th anniversary of their 1959 World Series Championship. The Dodgers reached the NLCS for the second straight season only to once more fall short in five games against the Philadelphia Phillies.

== Spring training ==
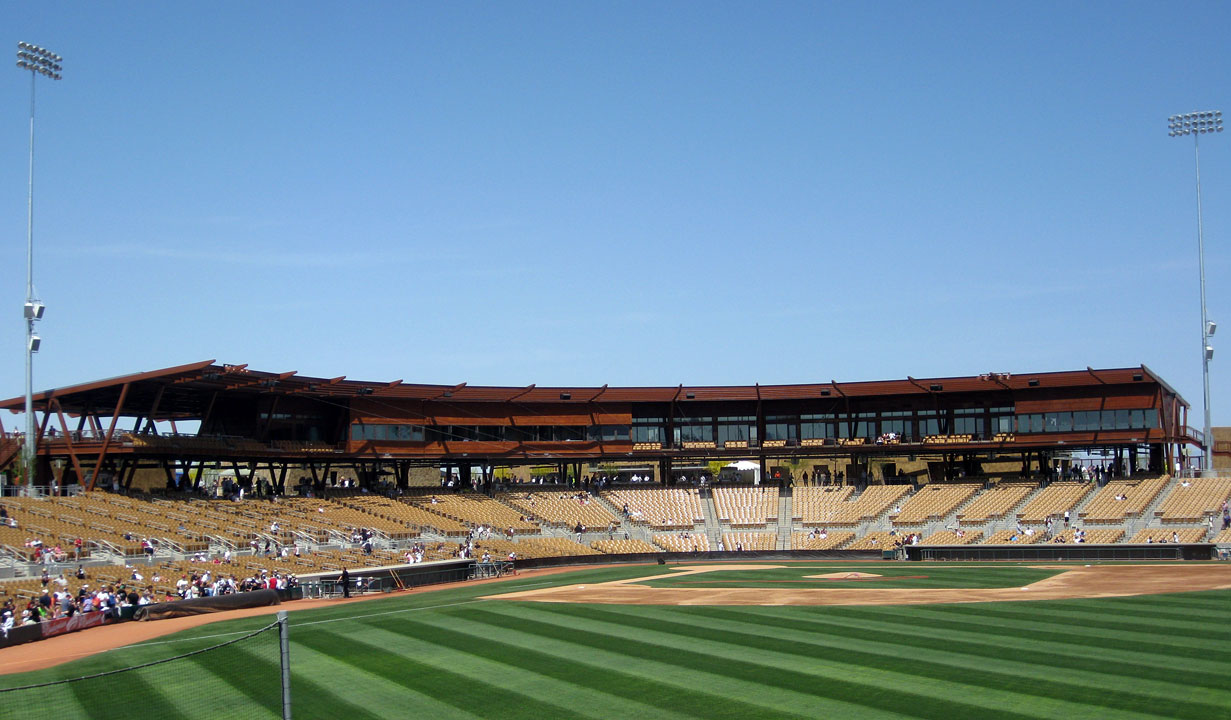
View from Right Field, Camelback Ranch, Glendale, Az.

2009 saw the Dodgers open their brand new spring training facility, Camelback Ranch-Glendale. The 13,000-seat stadium and surrounding facilities that the Dodgers share with the Chicago White Sox replaced their former facility at Holman Stadium in Vero Beach, Florida, where the team had trained in the spring since 1948. This also marked the Dodgers debut as a member of the Cactus League.

== Regular season ==
=== Season standings ===
NL West
Team	W	L	Pct.	GB	Home	Road
Los Angeles Dodgers	95	67	.586	—	50‍–‍31	45‍–‍36
Colorado Rockies	92	70	.568	3	51‍–‍30	41‍–‍40
San Francisco Giants	88	74	.543	7	52‍–‍29	36‍–‍45
San Diego Padres	75	87	.463	20	42‍–‍39	33‍–‍48
Arizona Diamondbacks	70	92	.432	25	36‍–‍45	34‍–‍47

=== Record vs. opponents ===
2009 National League record Source: MLB Standings Grid – 2009
Team	AZ	ATL	CHC	CIN	COL	FLA	HOU	LAD	MIL	NYM	PHI	PIT	SD	SF	STL	WAS	AL
Arizona	–	3–4	4–2	1–5	7–11	5–3	5–4	7–11	2–5	5–2	1–5	6–1	11–7	5–13	2–4	1–5	5–10
Atlanta	4–3	–	4–2	3–6	4–4	8–10	3–3	4–3	3–3	13–5	10–8	3–4	3–3	3–4	4–2	10–8	7–8
Chicago	2–4	2–4	–	10–5	2–4	4–3	11–6	3–5	10–7	3–3	1–5	10–4	4–5	4–2	6–10	5–2	6–9
Cincinnati	5–1	6–3	5–10	–	0–7	3–3	12–4	1–5	8–7	2–4	2–5	13–5	1–6	3–3	8–8	3–4	6–9
Colorado	11–7	4–4	4–2	7–0	–	2–4	2–5	4–14	6–0	3–4	2–4	6–3	10–8	8–10	6–1	6–0	11–4
Florida	3–5	10–8	3–4	3–3	4–2	–	4–3	3–3	3–4	11–7	9–9	2–4	4–2	3–4	3–3	12–6	10–8
Houston	4–5	3–3	6–11	4–12	5–2	3–4	–	4–3	5–10	1–5	6–2	10–5	6–1	2–4	6–9	3–3	6–9
Los Angeles	11–7	3–4	5–3	5–1	14–4	3–3	3–4	–	3–3	5–1	4–3	4–3	10–8	11–7	2–5	3–2	9–9
Milwaukee	5–2	3–3	7–10	7–8	0–6	4–3	10–5	3–3	–	3–3	4–3	9–5	2–4	4–5	9–9	5–3	5–10
New York	2–5	5–13	3–3	4–2	4–3	7–11	5–1	1–5	3–3	–	6–12	4–3	2–5	5–3	4–5	10–8	5–10
Philadelphia	5–1	8–10	5–1	5–2	4–2	9–9	2–6	3–4	3–4	12–6	–	4–2	5–2	3–4	4–1	15–3	6–12
Pittsburgh	1–6	4–3	4–10	5–13	3–6	4–2	5–10	3–4	5–9	3–4	2–4	–	3–4	2–4	5–10	5–3	8–7
San Diego	7–11	3–3	5–4	6–1	8–10	2–4	1–6	8–10	4–2	5–2	2–5	4–3	–	10–8	1–6	4–2	5–10
San Francisco	13–5	4–3	2–4	3–3	10–8	4–3	4–2	7–11	5–4	3–5	4–3	4–2	8–10	–	4–3	4–2	9–6
St. Louis	4–2	2–4	10–6	8–8	1–6	3–3	9–6	5–2	9–9	5–4	1–4	10–5	6–1	3–4	–	6–1	9–6
Washington	5–1	8–10	2–5	4–3	0–6	6–12	3–3	2–3	3–5	8–10	3–15	3–5	2–4	2–4	1–6	–	7–11

=== Game log ===
2009 Game Log
April (15–8)

#	Date	Opponent	Score	Win	Loss	Save	Attendance	Record
1	April 6	@ Padres	4–1	Kuroda (1–0)	Peavy (0–1)	Broxton (1)	45,496	1–0
2	April 7	@ Padres	4–2	Young (1–0)	Wolf (0–1)	Bell (1)	20,035	1–1
3	April 8	@ Padres	5–2	Billingsley (1–0)	Mujica (0–1)	Broxton (2)	31,700	2–1
4	April 9	@ Padres	4–3	Meredith (1–0)	Wade (0–1)	Bell (2)	29,710	2–2
5	April 10	@ Diamondbacks	9–4	Garland (1–0)	McDonald (0–1)		31,036	2–3
6	April 11	@ Diamondbacks	11–2	Stults (1–0)	Petit (0–1)		35,024	3–3
7	April 12	@ Diamondbacks	3–1	Wolf (1–1)	Haren (0–2)	Broxton (3)	25,485	4–3
8	April 13	Giants	11–1	Billingsley (2–0)	Johnson (0–2)		57,099	5–3
9	April 15	Giants	5–4	Broxton (1–0)	Howry (0–1)		42,511	6–3
10	April 16	Giants	7–2	Stults (2–0)	Zito (0–2)		36,553	7–3
11	April 17	Rockies	4–3	Mota (1–0)	Embree (0–1)	Broxton (4)	45,145	8–3
12	April 18	Rockies	9–5	Billingsley (3–0)	Cook (0–1)		36,765	9–3
13	April 19	Rockies	14–2	Elbert (1–0)	Jiménez (1–2)		41,474	10–3
14	April 21	@ Astros	8–5	Ortiz (1–0)	Kershaw (0–1)	Valverde (1)	26,360	10–4
15	April 22	@ Astros	6–5	Sampson (1–0)	Belisario (0–1)	Hawkins (2)	26,725	10–5
16	April 23	@ Astros	2–0	Billingsley (4–0)	Rodríguez (1–2)	Broxton (5)	26,081	11–5
17	April 24	@ Rockies	6–5	Kuo (1–0)	Corpas (0–1)	Broxton (6)	36,151	12–5
18	April 25	@ Rockies	6–5	McDonald (1–1)	Jiménez (1–3)	Troncoso (1)	31,476	13–5
19	April 26	@ Rockies	10–4	Marquis (3–1)	Kershaw (0–2)		35,505	13–6
20	April 27	@ Giants	5–4	Valdéz (1–0)	Belisario (0–2)	Wilson (4)	30,091	13–7
21	April 28	@ Giants	5–3	Broxton (2–0)	Howry (0–2)	Ohman (1)	30,482	14–7
22	April 29	@ Giants	9–4	Lincecum (2–1)	Stults (2–1)	Wilson (5)	37,717	14–8
23	April 30	Padres	8–5	Belisario (1–2)	Gregerson (0–1)	Broxton (7)	54,628	15–8

May (20–9)

#	Date	Opponent	Score	Win	Loss	Save	Attendance	Record
24	May 1	Padres	1–0	Broxton (3–0)	Sánchez (1–1)		47,210	16–8
25	May 2	Padres	2–1 (10)	Mota (2–0)	Gregerson (0–2)		47,680	17–8
26	May 3	Padres	7–3	Billingsley (5–0)	Gaudin (0–1)		52,096	18–8
27	May 4	Diamondbacks	7–2	Stults (3–1)	Davis (2–4)		30,530	19–8
28	May 5	Diamondbacks	3–1	Weaver (1–0)	Scherzer (0–3)	Broxton (8)	33,557	20–8
29	May 6	Nationals	10–3	Kershaw (1–2)	Cabrera (0–3)		31,348	21–8
30	May 7	Nationals	11–9	Villone (1–0)	Wade (0–2)		37,074	21–9
31	May 8	Giants	3–1	Zito (1–2)	Billingsley (5–1)	Wilson (7)	51,209	21–10
32	May 9	Giants	8–0	Stults (4–1)	Sánchez (1–3)		41,425	22–10
33	May 10	Giants	7–5 (13)	Wilson (2–0)	Mota (2–1)		37,529	22–11
34	May 12	@ Phillies	5–3	Park (1–1)	Kershaw (1–3)	Lidge (5)	45,191	22–12
35	May 13	@ Phillies	9–2	Wolf (2–1)	Moyer (3–3)		45,273	23–12
36	May 14	@ Phillies	5–3 (10)	Broxton (4–0)	Durbin (1–1)	Troncoso (2)	45,307	24–12
37	May 15	@ Marlins	6–4	Weaver (2–0)	Volstad (2–3)	Broxton (9)	20,039	25–12
38	May 16	@ Marlins	6–3	Miller (1–1)	Weaver (2–1)	Lindstrom (7)	25,132	25–13
39	May 17	@ Marlins	12–5	Kershaw (2–3)	Koronka (0–2)		16,332	26–13
40	May 18	Mets	3–2 (11)	Troncoso (1–0)	Stokes (1–2)		37,136	27–13
41	May 19	Mets	5–3	Billingsley (6–1)	Maine (3–3)	Broxton (10)	37,857	28–13
42	May 20	Mets	2–1	Leach (1–0)	Putz (1–3)	Broxton (11)	50,761	29–13
43	May 22	Angels	3–1	Oliver (1–0)	Wade (0–3)	Fuentes (12)	55,053	29–14
44	May 23	Angels	5–4 (10)	Broxton (5–0)	Arredondo (1–1)		55,301	30–14
45	May 24	Angels	10–7	Bulger (2–1)	Billingsley (6–2)		54,122	30–15
46	May 25	@ Rockies	16–6	Ohman (1–0)	de la Rosa (0–5)		37,024	31–15
47	May 26	@ Rockies	7–1	Milton (1–0)	Cook (3–2)		25,384	32–15
48	May 27	@ Rockies	8–6	Kershaw (3–3)	Jiménez (3–6)		22,271	33–15
49	May 28	@ Cubs	2–1	Wolf (3–1)	Wells (0–2)	Troncoso (3)	39,579	34–15
50	May 29	@ Cubs	2–1	Lilly (6–4)	Billingsley (6–3)	Gregg (8)	40,148	34–16
51	May 30	@ Cubs	7–0	Dempster (4–3)	Stults (4–2)		41,153	34–17
52	May 31	@ Cubs	8–2	Milton (2–0)	Marshall (3–4)		40,091	35–17

June (14–12)

#	Date	Opponent	Score	Win	Loss	Save	Attendance	Record
53	June 1	Diamondbacks	3–2	Buckner (2–1)	Kuroda (1–1)	Peña (1)	32,304	35–18
54	June 2	Diamondbacks	6–5	Weaver (3–1)	Schlereth (0–1)	Broxton (12)	32,853	36–18
55	June 3	Diamondbacks	1–0	Billingsley (7–3)	Garland (4–5)	Broxton (13)	33,804	37–18
56	June 4	Phillies	3–0	Hamels (4–2)	Kershaw (3–4)		33,839	37–19
57	June 5	Phillies	4–3	Broxton (6–0)	Lidge (0–3)		52,538	38–19
58	June 6	Phillies	3–2 (12)	Wade (1–3)	Durbin (1–2)		41,412	39–19
59	June 7	Phillies	7–2	Bastardo (2–0)	Wolf (3–2)		42,288	39–20
60	June 9	Padres	6–4	Billingsley (8–3)	Young (4–5)	Broxton (14)	35,313	40–20
61	June 10	Padres	3–1	Correia (3–4)	Kershaw (3–5)	Bell (18)	44,079	40–21
62	June 12	@ Rangers	6–0	Padilla (5–3)	Kuroda (1–2)		36,591	40–22
63	June 13	@ Rangers	3–1	Wade (2–3)	Grilli (0–1)	Broxton (15)	37,262	41–22
64	June 14	@ Rangers	6–3	Billingsley (9–3)	Holland (1–4)	Broxton (16)	36,343	42–22
65	June 16	Athletics	5–4 (10)	Mota (3–1)	Ziegler (1–2)		41,169	43–22
66	June 17	Athletics	5–4	Cahill (4–5)	Kuroda (1–3)	Bailey (6)	46,274	43–23
67	June 18	Athletics	3–2	Leach (2–0)	Ziegler (1–3)	Troncoso (4)	50,492	44–23
68	June 19	@ Angels	5–4	Speier (3–1)	Mota (3–2)	Fuentes (19)	44,222	44–24
69	June 20	@ Angels	6–4	Weaver (4–1)	Weaver (7–3)		44,148	45–24
70	June 21	@ Angels	5–3	Kershaw (4–5)	Lackey (2–3)	Broxton (17)	43,891	46–24
71	June 23	@ White Sox	5–2	Kuroda (2–3)	Danks (5–6)	Broxton (18)	22,251	47–24
72	June 24	@ White Sox	10–7	Floyd (5–5)	Wolf (3–3)	Jenks (18)	20,142	47–25
73	June 25	@ White Sox	6–5 (13)	Poreda (1–0)	Weaver (4–2)		20,051	47–26
74	June 26	Mariners	8–2	Kershaw (5–5)	Vargas (3–3)		50,752	48–26
75	June 27	Mariners	5–1	Hernández (8–3)	Milton (2–1)		50,847	48–27
76	June 28	Mariners	4–2	Olson (3–2)	Kuroda (2–4)	Aardsma (16)	49,355	48–28
77	June 29	Rockies	4–2 (13)	McDonald (2–1)	Peralta (0–1)		41,288	49–28
78	June 30	Rockies	3–0	Marquis (10–5)	Billingsley (9–4)		43,437	49–29

July (15–10)

#	Date	Opponent	Score	Win	Loss	Save	Attendance	Record
79	July 1	Rockies	1–0	Troncoso (2–0)	Hammel (5–4)	Broxton (19)	40,455	50–29
80	July 3	@ Padres	6–3	Kuroda (3–4)	Gaudin (4–7)	Broxton (20)	42,217	51–29
81	July 4	@ Padres	7–4	Burke (1–0)	Belisario (1–3)	Bell (23)	42,069	51–30
82	July 5	@ Padres	7–6 (13)	Weaver (5–2)	Mujica (2–4)		30,070	52–30
83	July 7	@ Mets	8–0	Kershaw (6–5)	Pelfrey (6–4)		39,636	53–30
84	July 8	@ Mets	5–4	Pérez (2–2)	Kuroda (3–5)	Rodríguez (22)	40,027	53–31
85	July 9	@ Mets	11–2	Wolf (4–3)	Hernández (5–5)		39,865	54–31
86	July 10	@ Brewers	12–8 (10)	Troncoso (3–0)	Villanueva (2–6)		41,811	55–31
87	July 11	@ Brewers	6–3	Burns (2–2)	Weaver (5–3)	Hoffman (20)	43,466	55–32
88	July 12	@ Brewers	7–4	Kershaw (7–5)	Gallardo (8–7)	Troncoso (5)	42,241	56–32
89	July 16	Astros	3–0	Rodríguez (9–6)	Wolf (4–4)	Valverde (9)	45,970	56–33
90	July 17	Astros	8–1	Oswalt (6–4)	Billingsley (9–5)		51,209	56–34
91	July 18	Astros	5–2	Kershaw (8–5)	Hampton (5–7)	Broxton (21)	48,298	57–34
92	July 19	Astros	4–3	Troncoso (4–0)	Hawkins (1–4)	Broxton (22)	40,340	58–34
93	July 20	Reds	7–5	Schmidt (1–0)	Owings (6–10)	Broxton (23)	48,110	59–34
94	July 21	Reds	12–3	Wolf (5–4)	Bailey (1–2)		49,027	60–34
95	July 22	Reds	6–2	Billingsley (10–5)	Arroyo (10–9)		56,000	61–34
96	July 24	Marlins	6–3	Johnson (9–2)	McDonald (2–2)	Núñez (7)	51,565	61–35
97	July 25	Marlins	4–3	Broxton (7–0)	Meyer (2–1)		50,248	62–35
98	July 26	Marlins	8–6	Volstad (8–9)	Schmidt (1–1)		48,597	62–36
99	July 27	@ Cardinals	6–1	Carpenter (9–3)	Wolf (5–5)	Franklin (23)	43,756	62–37
100	July 28	@ Cardinals	10–0	Wainwright (12–6)	Billingsley (10–6)		40,105	62–38
101	July 29	@ Cardinals	3–2 (15)	Hawksworth (1–0)	Weaver (5–4)		40,011	62–39
102	July 30	@ Cardinals	5–3 (10)	McDonald (3–2)	Reyes (0–2)	Broxton (24)	43,263	63–39
103	July 31	@ Braves	5–0	Schmidt (2–1)	Hanson (5–2)		45,225	64–39

August (14–15)

#	Date	Opponent	Score	Win	Loss	Save	Attendance	Record
104	August 1	@ Braves	4–3	Lowe (11–7)	Wolf (5–6)	Soriano (16)	49,843	64–40
105	August 2	@ Braves	9–1	Billingsley (11–6)	Jurrjens (9–8)		37,654	65–40
106	August 3	Brewers	6–5	Parra (6–8)	Kershaw (8–6)	Hoffman (24)	46,544	65–41
107	August 4	Brewers	17–4	Kuroda (4–5)	Gallardo (10–8)		45,535	66–41
108	August 5	Brewers	4–1	Looper (10–5)	Schmidt (2–2)	Hoffman (25)	50,276	66–42
109	August 6	Braves	5–4	Elbert (2–0)	Soriano (1–3)		46,399	67–42
110	August 7	Braves	9–5 (12)	Moylan (4–2)	Troncoso (4–1)		53,184	67–43
111	August 8	Braves	2–1 (10)	Medlen (3–3)	Mota (3–3)	Soriano (17)	53,338	67–44
112	August 9	Braves	8–2	Vázquez (10–7)	Stults (4–3)		45,438	67–45
113	August 10	@ Giants	4–2	Kuroda (5–5)	Sánchez (5–10)	Broxton (25)	40,522	68–45
114	August 11	@ Giants	9–1	Wolf (6–6)	Martinez (2–1)		41,167	69–45
115	August 12	@ Giants	4–2 (10)	Wilson (4–5)	Mota (3–4)		43,300	69–46
116	August 14	@ Diamondbacks	4–1	Haren (12–7)	Kershaw (8–7)	Qualls (22)	31,573	69–47
117	August 15	@ Diamondbacks	4–3 (10)	Qualls (2–1)	Troncoso (4–2)		42,058	69–48
118	August 16	@ Diamondbacks	9–3	Wolf (7–6)	Petit (2–7)		34,012	70–48
119	August 17	Cardinals	3–2	Carpenter (13–3)	Haeger (0–1)	Franklin (30)	49,415	70–49
120	August 18	Cardinals	7–3	Billingsley (12–6)	Boggs (1–2)	Broxton (26)	49,052	71–49
121	August 19	Cardinals	3–2	McClellan (4–2)	Broxton (7–1)	Franklin (31)	54,847	71–50
122	August 20	Cubs	7–2	Belisario (2–3)	Guzmán (2–3)		48,974	72–50
123	August 21	Cubs	2–1	Wolf (8–6)	Wells (9–6)	Broxton (27)	51,579	73–50
124	August 22	Cubs	2–0	Haeger (1–1)	Lilly (9–8)	Sherrill (1)	49,297	74–50
125	August 23	Cubs	3–1	Dempster (7–7)	Billingsley (12–7)	Mármol (5)	49,711	74–51
126	August 25	@ Rockies	5–4 (10)	Herges (1–0)	McDonald (3–3)		31,472	74–52
127	August 26	@ Rockies	6–1	Wolf (9–6)	Fogg (0–2)		38,350	75–52
128	August 27	@ Rockies	3–2	Padilla (1–0)	de la Rosa (12–9)	Broxton (28)	33,441	76–52
129	August 28	@ Reds	4–2	Bailey (4–4)	Billingsley (12–8)		19,258	76–53
130	August 29	@ Reds	11–4	Weaver (6–4)	Maloney (0–3)		25,744	77–53
131	August 30	@ Reds	3–2 (12)	McDonald (4–3)	Cordero (2–4)	Broxton (29)	26,091	78–53
132	August 31	Diamondbacks	5–3 (10)	Vásquez (3–2)	McDonald (4–4)	Gutiérrez (2)	45,211	78–54

September/October (17–13)

#	Date	Opponent	Score	Win	Loss	Save	Attendance	Record
133	September 1	Diamondbacks	4–3	Belisario (3–3)	Rosales (1–1)	Broxton (30)	45,433	79–54
134	September 2	Diamondbacks	4–1	Scherzer (9–8)	Billingsley (12–9)	Gutiérrez (3)	45,076	79–55
135	September 3	Diamondbacks	4–2	Garland (9–11)	Buckner (2–6)	Broxton (31)	45,365	80–55
136	September 4	Padres	2–0	LeBlanc (1–1)	Kershaw (8–8)	Bell (34)	52,965	80–56
137	September 5	Padres	7–4	Wolf (10–6)	Latos (4–5)	Broxton (32)	53,368	81–56
138	September 6	Padres	4–3	Stauffer (4–6)	Kuroda (5–6)	Bell (35)	47,528	81–57
139	September 7	@ Diamondbacks	7–2	Padilla (2–0)	Scherzer (9–9)	Broxton (33)	28,317	82–57
140	September 8	@ Diamondbacks	5–4	McDonald (5–4)	Schlereth (0–3)	Broxton (34)	22,589	83–57
141	September 9	@ Diamondbacks	4–3	Gutiérrez (4–3)	Troncoso (4–3)		20,025	83–58
142	September 11	@ Giants	10–3	Kuroda (6–6)	Cain (13–5)		39,212	84–58
143	September 12	@ Giants	9–1	Padilla (3–0)	Sánchez (6–12)		41,710	85–58
144	September 13	@ Giants	7–2	Penny (3–0)	Billingsley (12–10)		40,579	85–59
145	September 14	Pirates	6–2	Garland (10–11)	McCutchen (0–2)		42,045	86–59
146	September 15	Pirates	5–4 (13)	Belisario (4–3)	Dumatrait (0–1)		52,562	87–59
147	September 16	Pirates	3–1	Kuroda (7–6)	Hart (4–7)	Broxton (35)	53,193	88–59
148	September 18	Giants	8–4	Howry (2–6)	Troncoso (4–4)		53,679	88–60
149	September 19	Giants	12–1	Garland (11–11)	Penny (3–1)		52,438	89–60
150	September 20	Giants	6–2	Wolf (11–6)	Lincecum (14–6)		53,233	90–60
151	September 22	@ Nationals	14–2	Kuroda (8–6)	Hernández (8–12)		18,518	91–60
152	September 23	@ Nationals	5–4	Rivera (1–3)	McDonald (5–5)		18,635	91–61
153	September 24	@ Nationals	7–6	Troncoso (5–4)	Villone (4–6)	Broxton (36)	22,432	92–61
154	September 25	@ Pirates	3–1	Veal (1–0)	Garland (11–12)	Capps (26)	19,452	92–62
155	September 26	@ Pirates	8–4	Sherrill (1–0)	Bautista (1–1)		35,605	93–62
156	September 27	@ Pirates	6–5	Capps (4–8)	Broxton (7–2)		26,831	93–63
157	September 28	@ Pirates	11–1	Duke (11–15)	Kuroda (8–7)		16,696	93–64
158	September 29	@ Padres	3–1	Webb (2–0)	Billingsley (12–11)	Bell (41)	25,318	93–65
159	September 30	@ Padres	5–0	Richard (5–2)	Garland (11–13)		25,469	93–66
160	October 2	Rockies	4–3	Jiménez (15–12)	Wolf (11–7)	Street (35)	54,131	93–67
161	October 3	Rockies	5–0	Kuo (2–0)	Morales (3–2)		54,531	94–67
162	October 4	Rockies	5–3	Padilla (4–0)	Marquis (15–13)	Troncoso (6)	51,396	95–67

=== April ===
The Dodgers began their season on April 13 at Dodger Stadium. Orlando Hudson hit for the cycle with an infield single in the first inning, a home run in the third, a double in the fourth, and a triple in the sixth. He was the first Dodger to hit for the cycle since Wes Parker in 1970. Hudson became the first Dodger to hit for the cycle at Dodger Stadium, and did it in front of a record crowd of 57,099.

=== May ===
A strong start to the season resulted in a record of 13–0 at home, beating the previous club record (9–0) held by the 1946 team, the previous National League record (10–0) held by the 1918 Giants, the 1970 Cubs, and the 1983 Braves, and the previous Major League record (12–0) held by the 1911 Tigers. On May 7, MLB announced a 50-game suspension for Manny Ramirez as a result of his testing positive for a banned substance under the collective bargaining agreement. A game against the Colorado Rockies on May 25th at Coors Field saw the Dodgers score seven runs in the fourth inning and eight runs in the seventh to key a 16–6 rout of the Rockies.

=== June ===
The month opened with a loss to the Arizona Diamondbacks. The Dodgers had five wild pitches: three by Cory Wade in the seventh inning and two by Brent Leach in the eighth. This set a record for most wild pitches in a single game in club history and tied a franchise record set in 1918. On June 5 and 6, Andre Ethier provided a walk-off game-winning hit on each day to defeat the Philadelphia Phillies. Ethier hit a 2-run double in the bottom of the 9th inning on June 5 to give the Dodgers a 4–3 win, and then hit a solo home run in the 12th inning on June 6 to give the Dodgers a 3–2 victory. Jeff Weaver started for the Dodgers against the Los Angeles Angels on June 20th. The opposing starter was his younger brother Jered Weaver. This was the first pitching matchup between brothers since 2002 when Andy and Alan Benes matched up and only the 15th such game since 1967. The Dodgers won 6–4.

=== July ===
On July 10, Manny Ramirez hit a two-run homer in the top of the sixth against the Milwaukee Brewers. This home run tied Mickey Mantle for 15th place on the all-time home run list with 536 career home runs. He hit his 537th on July 20 against the Cincinnati Reds to pass Mantle. Two days later, Ramirez hit a pinch-hit grand slam in the bottom of the sixth inning also against the Reds. This was his 21st career grand slam (2nd all-time behind Lou Gehrig) and first career pinch hit homer. The home run came on "Manny Ramirez Bobblehead night" at the Stadium. The Dodgers did not lose three games in a row until a loss to the St. Louis Cardinals on July 28. They were the last team in the 2009 season to lose three games in a row. This was the deepest into the season a Major League Baseball team had gone without losing three straight since the 2001 Seattle Mariners, who lost their third straight on September 22. The team suffered a blowout 10–0 loss to the St. Louis Cardinals on July 28th. Utility infielder Mark Loretta pitched one-third of an inning in the bottom of the eighth for the Dodgers, hitting the first batter and inducing the second batter to fly out. Loretta had pitched an inning of relief in 2001 for the Milwaukee Brewers, and was the first Dodger position player to pitch since Robin Ventura in 2004.

=== August ===
On August 4, the Dodgers beat the Milwaukee Brewers 17–4 at Dodger Stadium. The 17 runs scored was the highest run total by the Dodgers in a home game since they also scored 17 on May 25, 1979, against the Cincinnati Reds. With two outs in the ninth inning, relief pitcher Guillermo Mota hit Brewers first baseman Prince Fielder with a pitch (apparently in retaliation for Chris Smith hitting Manny Ramirez a few innings earlier). Mota was ejected from the game. After the game, Fielder attempted to gain entry into the Dodgers clubhouse to confront Mota but was stopped by security guards. Both Mota and Fielder were fined by Major League Baseball for their actions. In a road game against the Arizona Diamondbacks on August 15, Dodgers pitcher Hiroki Kuroda was hit in the head by a line drive off the bat of Rusty Ryal. After leaving the game, he was diagnosed with a concussion and stayed in the hospital overnight. Five days later, Russell Martin hit a grand-slam home run in the sixth inning to break open a 2–2 tie and lead the Dodgers to a 7–2 victory over the Chicago Cubs. It was the fourth home run for Martin in the 2009 season and his second career grand slam. On August 21, Randy Wolf, George Sherrill, and Jonathan Broxton combined to one-hit the Chicago Cubs and beat them 2–1. Wolf hit a double in the second inning to score the Dodgers' only two runs.

=== September ===
On September 5, Randy Wolf picked up his 100th career win, in a 7–4 victory over the San Diego Padres at Dodger Stadium. Soon after on September 8, the Dodgers tied a franchise record by hitting into five double plays in a road game against the Arizona Diamondbacks. Russell Martin (second inning), Rafael Furcal (third inning), James Loney (fourth inning), Matt Kemp (sixth inning) and Ronnie Belliard (seventh inning) all hit into double plays in the game. The Dodgers came from behind to win the game 5–4. On September 26, the Dodgers came from behind to beat the Pittsburgh Pirates 8–4 at Pittsburgh. The victory clinched a playoff spot for the Dodgers, their third in four seasons. The last time the Dodgers made the playoffs three times in four years was 1963–66.

=== October ===
On October 3, the Dodgers broke open a scoreless game against the Colorado Rockies with a five-run seventh inning and held on for the 5–0 victory that clinched their second straight National League West championship. It was the first time the Dodgers won back-to-back division pennants since 1977–78.

== Opening Day starters ==
Opening Day starters
Name	Position
Rafael Furcal	Shortstop
Orlando Hudson	Second baseman
Manny Ramirez	Left fielder
Andre Ethier	Right fielder
Russell Martin	Catcher
James Loney	First baseman
Matt Kemp	Center fielder
Casey Blake	Third baseman
Hiroki Kuroda	Starting pitcher

== Roster ==
2009 Los Angeles Dodgers
Roster
Pitchers: 54 Ronald Belisario; 58 Chad Billingsley; 51 Jonathan Broxton; 57 Scott Elbert; 21 Jon Garland; 37 Charlie Haeger; 22 Clayton Kershaw; 56 Hong-Chih Kuo; 18 Hiroki Kuroda; 45 Brent Leach; 52,31 James McDonald; 28 Eric Milton; 59 Guillermo Mota; 43 Will Ohman; 44 Vicente Padilla; 49 Travis Schlichting; 29 Jason Schmidt; 52 George Sherrill; 50 Eric Stults; 38 Ramón Troncoso; 49 Claudio Vargas; 47 Cory Wade; 36 Jeff Weaver; 21,43 Randy Wolf	Catchers: 12 Brad Ausmus; 44,49 A. J. Ellis; 55 Russell Martin; Infielders: 21 Tony Abreu; 3 Ronnie Belliard; 23 Casey Blake; 14 Juan Castro; 33 Blake DeWitt; 15 Rafael Furcal; 60 Chin-lung Hu; 13 Orlando Hudson; 7 James Loney; 5 Mark Loretta; 26 Doug Mientkiewicz	Outfielders: 16 Andre Ethier; 30 Jamie Hoffmann; 17 Mitch Jones; 27 Matt Kemp; 3 Xavier Paul; 9 Juan Pierre; 99 Manny Ramirez; 17 Jason Repko; Other batters: 25 Jim Thome	Manager: 6 Joe Torre; Coaches: 10 Larry Bowa (third base); 25,35 Mariano Duncan (1st base); 40 Rick Honeycutt (pitching); 48 Ken Howell (bullpen); 8 Don Mattingly (hitting); 11 Manny Mota; 46 Bob Schaefer (bench)

== Postseason ==
=== Postseason Game log ===
2009 Postseason
National League Division Series (3–0)

Game	Date	Opponent	Score	Win	Loss	Save	Attendance	Series
1	October 7	Cardinals	5–3	Weaver (1–0)	Carpenter (0–1)	Broxton (1)	56,000	1–0
2	October 8	Cardinals	3–2	Sherrill (1–0)	Franklin (0–1)		51,819	2–0
3	October 10	@ Cardinals	5–1	Padilla (1–0)	Piñeiro (0–1)		47,296	3–0

National League Championship Series (1–4)

Game	Date	Opponent	Score	Win	Loss	Save	Attendance	Series
1	October 15	Phillies	8–6	Hamels (1–0)	Kershaw (0–1)	Lidge (1)	56,000	0–1
2	October 16	Phillies	2–1	Kuo (1–0)	Park (0–1)	Broxton (1)	56,000	1–1
3	October 18	@ Phillies	11–0	Lee (1–0)	Kuroda (0–1)		45,721	1–2
4	October 19	@ Phillies	5–4	Lidge (1–0)	Broxton (0–1)		46,157	1–3
5	October 21	@ Phillies	10–4	Durbin (1–0)	Padilla (0–1)		46,214	1–4

=== National League Division Series ===
As National League West champions, the Dodgers faced the St. Louis Cardinals in the Division Series and held home field advantage. They swept the Cardinals in three games.

==== Game 1 ====
Wednesday, October 7, 2009 – 6:37 p.m. (PT) at Dodger Stadium in Los Angeles, California

Team	1	2	3	4	5	6	7	8	9	R	H	E
St. Louis	1	0	0	1	0	0	0	0	1	3	11	0
Los Angeles	2	0	1	0	1	1	0	0	X	5	12	0
WP: Jeff Weaver (1–0) LP: Chris Carpenter (0–1) Sv: Jonathan Broxton (1); Home runs: STL: None; LAD: Matt Kemp (1)

==== Game 2 ====
Thursday, October 8, 2009 – 3:07 p.m. (PT) at Dodger Stadium in Los Angeles, California

Team	1	2	3	4	5	6	7	8	9	R	H	E
St. Louis	0	1	0	0	0	0	1	0	0	2	10	1
Los Angeles	0	0	0	1	0	0	0	0	2	3	5	0
WP: George Sherrill (1–0) LP: Ryan Franklin (0–1); Home runs: STL: Matt Holliday (1); LAD: Andre Ethier (1)

==== Game 3 ====
Saturday, October 10, 2009 – 3:07 p.m. (PT) at Busch Stadium in St. Louis, Missouri

Team	1	2	3	4	5	6	7	8	9	R	H	E
Los Angeles	1	0	2	1	0	0	1	0	0	5	12	0
St. Louis	0	0	0	0	0	0	0	1	0	1	6	1
WP: Vicente Padilla (1–0) LP: Joel Piñeiro (0–1); Home runs: LAD: Andre Ethier (2); STL: None

=== National League Championship Series ===
The Dodgers advanced to the NLCS and faced the Philadelphia Phillies in a rematch of the 2008 National League Championship Series. However, they again lost to the Phillies in five games.

==== Game 1 ====
Thursday, October 15, 2009 – 5:07 p.m. (PT) at Dodger Stadium in Los Angeles, California

Team	1	2	3	4	5	6	7	8	9	R	H	E
Philadelphia	0	0	0	0	5	0	0	3	0	8	8	1
Los Angeles	0	1	0	0	3	0	0	2	0	6	14	0
WP: Cole Hamels (1–0) LP: Clayton Kershaw (0–1) Sv: Brad Lidge (1); Home runs: PHI: Carlos Ruiz (1), Raúl Ibañez (1); LAD: James Loney (1), Manny Ramirez (1)

==== Game 2 ====
Friday, October 16, 2009 – 1:07 p.m. (PT) at Dodger Stadium in Los Angeles, California

Team	1	2	3	4	5	6	7	8	9	R	H	E
Philadelphia	0	0	0	1	0	0	0	0	0	1	4	1
Los Angeles	0	0	0	0	0	0	0	2	X	2	5	0
WP: Hong-Chih Kuo (1–0) LP: Chan Ho Park (0–1) Sv: Jonathan Broxton (1); Home runs: PHI: Ryan Howard (1); LAD: None

==== Game 3 ====
Sunday, October 18, 2009 – 5:07 p.m. (PT) at Citizens Bank Park in Philadelphia, Pennsylvania

Team	1	2	3	4	5	6	7	8	9	R	H	E
Los Angeles	0	0	0	0	0	0	0	0	0	0	3	0
Philadelphia	4	2	0	0	2	0	0	3	X	11	10	0
WP: Cliff Lee (1–0) LP: Hiroki Kuroda (0–1); Home runs: LAD: None; PHI: Jayson Werth (1), Shane Victorino (1)

==== Game 4 ====
Monday, October 19, 2009 – 5:07 p.m. (PT) at Citizens Bank Park in Philadelphia, Pennsylvania

Team	1	2	3	4	5	6	7	8	9	R	H	E
Los Angeles	0	0	0	2	1	1	0	0	0	4	8	0
Philadelphia	2	0	0	0	0	1	0	0	2	5	5	1
WP: Brad Lidge (1–0) LP: Jonathan Broxton (0–1); Home runs: LAD: Matt Kemp (1); PHI: Ryan Howard (2)

==== Game 5 ====
Wednesday, October 21, 2009 – 5:07 p.m. (PT) at Citizens Bank Park in Philadelphia, Pennsylvania

Team	1	2	3	4	5	6	7	8	9	R	H	E
Los Angeles	1	1	0	0	1	0	0	1	0	4	8	0
Philadelphia	3	1	0	2	0	2	1	1	X	10	8	0
WP: Chad Durbin (1–0) LP: Vicente Padilla (0–1); Home runs: LAD: Orlando Hudson (1), Andre Ethier (1), James Loney (2); PHI: Jayson Werth 2 (3), Pedro Feliz (1), Shane Victorino (2)

== Player stats ==
Team leaders in each category are in bold.

=== Batting ===
Note: G = Games played; AB = At bats; R = Runs; H = Hits; 2B = Doubles; 3B = Triples; HR = Home runs; RBI = Runs batted in; TB = Total bases; BB = Walks; SO = Strikeouts; SB = Stolen bases; OBP = On-base percentage; SLG = Slugging; Avg. = Batting average

Player	G	AB	R	H	2B	3B	HR	RBI	TB	BB	SO	SB	OBP	SLG	AVG
Rafael Furcal	150	**613**	92	165	28	5	9	47	230	61	89	12	.335	.375	.269
Matt Kemp	159	606	**97**	**180**	25	7	26	101	297	52	**139**	**34**	.352	.490	**.297**
Andre Ethier	**160**	596	92	162	**42**	3	**31**	**106**	**303**	**72**	116	6	.361	**.508**	.272
James Loney	158	576	73	161	25	2	13	90	230	70	68	7	.357	.399	.281
Orlando Hudson	149	551	74	156	34	6	9	62	230	62	99	8	.357	.417	.283
Russell Martin	143	505	63	126	19	0	7	53	166	69	80	11	.352	.329	.250
Casey Blake	139	485	84	136	25	6	18	79	227	63	116	3	**.363**	.468	.280
Juan Pierre	145	380	57	117	16	**8**	0	31	149	27	27	30	.365	.392	.308
Manny Ramirez	104	352	62	102	24	2	19	63	187	71	81	0	.418	.531	.290
Mark Loretta	107	181	19	42	8	0	0	25	50	20	21	1	.309	.276	.232
Juan Castro	57	112	18	31	4	0	1	9	38	6	25	0	.311	.339	.277
Brad Ausmus	36	95	9	28	4	0	1	9	35	5	21	1	.343	.368	.295
Ronnie Belliard	24	77	13	27	7	0	5	17	49	6	16	1	.398	.636	.351
Blake DeWitt	31	49	4	10	3	0	2	4	19	3	7	0	.245	.388	.204
Jamie Hoffmann	14	22	2	4	2	0	1	7	9	0	5	0	.167	.409	.182
Doug Mientkiewicz	20	18	0	6	1	0	0	3	7	1	6	0	.400	.389	.333
Jim Thome	17	17	0	4	0	0	0	3	4	0	7	0	.235	.235	.235
Xavier Paul	11	14	3	3	1	0	1	1	7	2	4	0	.313	.500	.214
Mitch Jones	8	13	1	4	1	0	0	0	5	0	6	0	.400	.385	.308
A. J. Ellis	8	10	0	1	0	0	0	1	1	0	1	0	.100	.100	.100
Tony Abreu	6	8	0	2	0	0	0	1	2	3	2	0	.455	.250	.250
Chin-lung Hu	5	5	2	2	1	0	0	2	3	0	2	0	.333	.600	.400
Jason Repko	10	5	1	0	0	0	0	1	0	0	2	1	.143	.000	.000
Pitcher totals	162	302	14	41	7	0	2	24	54	14	128	1	.181	.179	.136
**Team totals**	**162**	**5592**	**780**	**1511**	**278**	**39**	**145**	**739**	**2302**	**607**	**1068**	**116**	**.346**	**.412**	**.270**

=== Pitching ===
Note: W = Wins; L = Losses; ERA = Earned run average; G = Games pitched; GS = Games started; SV = Saves; IP = Innings pitched; R = Runs allowed; ER = Earned runs allowed; BB = Walks allowed; K = Strikeouts

Player	W	L	ERA	G	GS	SV	IP	H	R	ER	BB	K
Randy Wolf	11	7	3.23	34	**34**	0	**214.1**	**178**	81	77	58	160
Chad Billingsley	**12**	**11**	4.03	33	32	0	196.1	173	**94**	**88**	86	179
Clayton Kershaw	8	8	**2.79**	31	30	0	171.0	119	55	53	**91**	**185**
Hiroki Kuroda	8	7	3.76	21	20	0	117.1	110	59	49	24	87
Ramón Troncoso	5	4	2.72	**73**	0	6	82.2	83	30	25	34	55
Jeff Weaver	6	4	3.65	28	7	0	79.0	87	34	32	33	64
Jonathan Broxton	7	2	2.61	**73**	0	**36**	76.0	44	24	22	29	114
Ronald Belisario	4	3	2.04	69	0	0	70.2	52	21	16	29	64
Guillermo Mota	3	4	3.44	61	0	0	65.1	53	25	25	24	39
James McDonald	5	5	4.00	45	4	0	63.0	60	34	28	34	54
Eric Stults	4	3	4.86	10	10	0	50.0	51	27	27	26	33
Vicente Padilla	4	0	3.20	8	7	0	39.1	36	15	14	12	38
Jon Garland	3	2	2.72	6	6	0	36.1	37	16	11	9	26
Hong-Chih Kuo	2	0	3.00	35	0	0	30.0	21	10	10	13	32
George Sherrill	1	0	0.65	30	0	1	27.2	19	2	2	11	22
Cory Wade	2	3	5.53	27	0	0	27.2	28	17	17	10	18
Eric Milton	2	1	3.80	5	5	0	23.2	30	12	10	6	20
Brent Leach	2	0	5.75	38	0	0	20.1	16	13	13	12	19
Scott Elbert	2	0	5.03	19	0	0	19.2	19	11	11	7	21
Charlie Haeger	1	1	3.32	6	3	0	19.0	13	7	7	7	15
Jason Schmidt	2	2	5.60	4	4	0	17.2	16	12	11	12	8
Will Ohman	1	0	5.84	21	0	1	12.1	12	8	8	8	7
Claudio Vargas	0	0	1.65	8	0	0	11.0	7	2	2	4	10
Travis Schlichting	0	0	3.38	2	0	0	2.2	1	2	1	5	2
**Team totals**	**95**	**67**	**3.41**	**162**	**162**	**44**	**1473.1**	**1265**	**611**	**558**	**584**	**1272**

== Awards and honors ==
- 2009 Major League Baseball All-Star Game
  - Chad Billingsley reserve
  - Jonathan Broxton reserve
  - Orlando Hudson reserve
- Gold Glove Award
  - Orlando Hudson
  - Matt Kemp
- Silver Slugger Award
  - Andre Ethier
  - Matt Kemp
- Player of the Week
  - Andre Ethier April 13–19
  - Andre Ethier July 20–26
- Sporting News National League All-Star
  - Matt Kemp

== Notable transactions ==
- July 30: Acquired George Sherrill from the Baltimore Orioles for Josh Bell and Steve Johnson.
- July 31: Acquired Vinny Rottino from the Milwaukee Brewers for Claudio Vargas.
- August 30: Acquired Ronnie Belliard from the Washington Nationals for Luis Garcia and a player to be named later (Víctor Gárate).
- August 31: Acquired Jim Thome and cash from the Chicago White Sox for Justin Fuller and cash.
- August 31: Acquired Jon Garland and cash from the Arizona Diamondbacks for a player to be named later (Tony Abreu).

== 2009 minor league teams ==
Level	Team	League	Manager	W	L	Position
AAA	Albuquerque Isotopes	Pacific Coast League	Tim Wallach	80	64	American South Division champions Lost in 1st round of playoffs
AA	Chattanooga Lookouts	Southern League	John Valentin	65	74	3rd place
High A	Inland Empire 66ers	California League	Carlos Subero	59	81	4th place
A	Great Lakes Loons	Midwest League	Juan Bustabad	81	59	2nd Place; Clinched playoff spot Lost in 2nd round of playoffs
Rookie	Ogden Raptors	Pioneer League	Damon Berryhill	42	34	3rd place 1st Half division winner Lost in 1st Round of Playoffs
Rookie	Arizona League Dodgers	Arizona League	Jeff Carter	24	32	4th Place
Rookie	DSL Dodgers	Dominican Summer League	Pedro Mega	30	40	9th place

- Seven members of the Class-A Great Lakes Loons were named to the Midwest League All-Star Game: catcher Tony Delmonico, shortstop Dee Gordon, second baseman Jamie Pedroza, outfielder Kyle Russell, and pitchers Javy Guerra, Jon Michael Redding and Josh Walter.
- Three members of the Class-A Inland Empire 66ers of San Bernardino were named to the California League All-Star Team. They include: Center fielder Trayvon Robinson and starting pitchers Alberto Bastardo and Tim Sexton.
- Third Baseman Pedro Baez of the Class-A Inland Empire 66ers of San Bernardino was selected to participate as a member of the "World Team" in the All-Star Futures Game.
- Four members of the Class-AA Chattanooga Lookouts were selected to play in the Southern League All-Star Game: C Lucas May, 3B Josh Bell, OF Andrew Lambo and Pitcher Matthew Sartor. Bell was named the MVP of the All-Star game after getting two hits, including a home run, and 2 RBIs in the game.
- Charlie Haeger of the AAA Albuquerque Isotopes was selected to the Pacific Coast League All-Star team.
- Dee Gordon of the Single-A Great Lakes Loons was named "Prospect of the Year" and "Most Valuable Player" of the Midwest League. Gordon was also named to the Postseason All-Star team alongside teammates Kyle Russell (who was named co-MVP) and Tony Delmonico. Gordon was later named the Dodgers "Minor League Player of the Year" as well.
- Scott Van Slyke of the Single-A Inland Empire 66ers of San Bernardino was named to the California League Post-Season All-Star team.
- Mitch Jones and Scott Strickland of the AAA Albuquerque Isotopes were named to the Pacific Coast League Post-Season All-Star Team.
- Albuquerque Isotopes Manager Tim Wallach was selected as the Pacific Coast League "Manager of the Year."
- Ogden Raptors outfielder Brian Cavazos-Galvez was named MVP of the Rookie-Class Pioneer League.
- LHP Scott Elbert was named the Dodgers minor league "Pitcher of the Year." He made 20 appearances with the AA Chattanooga Lookouts and AAA Albuquerque Isotopes during the season and finished 4–4 with a 3.84 ERA. He struck out 125 batters and walked only 44 in 96 innings.

== Major League Baseball draft ==
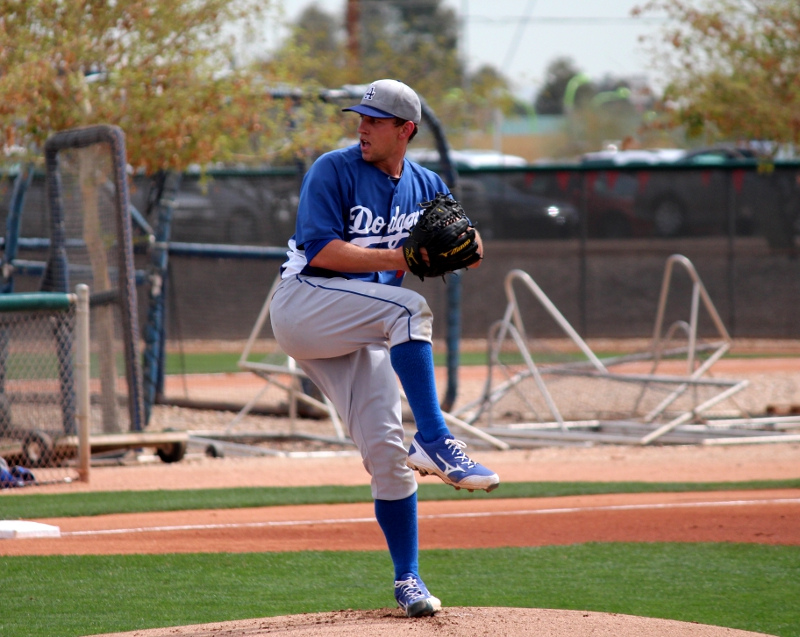
Aaron Miller

The Dodgers selected 51 players in this draft. Of those, seven of them have played Major League Baseball. They lost their first-round pick as a result of signing free agent Orlando Hudson but gained a supplemental first-round pick and a second-round pick as a compensation for losing pitcher Derek Lowe.

The Dodgers top pick in this draft was left-handed pitcher Aaron Miller from Baylor University. In five seasons in the minors he was 20–19 with a 4.03 ERA in 82 games (65 starts). Midway through the 2013 season, the Dodgers decided to take him off the mound and turn him into a position player. He hit 14 homers and drove in 60 RBI in 2014 in class-A as a designated hitter but retired after the season without making it to the Majors.

They went the opposite direction with outfielder Blake Smith from University of California, Berkeley. Also in the 2013 season they decided to take Smith and make him into a relief pitcher. He was later traded, and eventually made it to the majors with the Chicago White Sox.

2009 draft picks

Round	Name	Position	School	Signed	Career span	Highest level
1s	Aaron Miller	LHP	Baylor University	Yes	2009–2014	AA
2	Blake Smith	RF	University of California, Berkeley	Yes	2009–2016	MLB
2	Garrett Gould	RHP	Maize High School	Yes	2009–2017	AA
3	Brett Wallach	RHP	Orange Coast College	Yes	2009–2015	A+
4	Angelo Songco	CF	Loyola Marymount University	Yes	2009–2018	AA
5	J. T. Wise	C	University of Oklahoma	Yes	2009–2015	AAA
6	Jan Vazquez	C	Puerto Rico Baseball Academy	Yes	2009–2018	AAA
7	Brandon Martinez	RHP	Fowler High School	Yes	2009–2015	A+
8	Jon Garcia	RF	Luis Muñoz Marín High School	Yes	2009–2015	AA
9	Bryant Hernandez	SS	University of Oklahoma	Yes	2009–2011	AAA
10	Andy Suiter	LHP	University of California, Davis	Yes	2009–2012	A+
11	Connor Powers	1B	Mississippi State University	No; Padres-2010	2010–2012	A+
12	Brian Cavazos-Galvez	RF	University of New Mexico	Yes	2009–2015	AAA
13	J. B. Paxson	RHP	Western Kentucky University	Yes	2009–2010	A
14	Casio Grider	SS	Newberry College	Yes	2009–2018	AAA
15	Jeffrey Hunt	3B	St. Benedict Catholic Secondary School	Yes	2009–2012	A
16	Michael Pericht	C	St. Joseph's College	Yes	2009–2012	A+
17	Steve Ames	RHP	Gonzaga University	Yes	2009–2015	MLB
18	Greg Wilborn	LHP	University of Louisiana at Lafayette	Yes	2009–2013	A+
19	Nick Akins	LF	Vanguard University of Southern California	Yes	2009–2013	A+
20	Daniel Palo	RHP	Houston High School	No; Rockies-2013	2013–2014	A
21	Chris Henderson	3B	George Mason University	Yes	2009–2012	A
22	Stetson Banks	CF	Brigham Young University	Yes	2009–2010	A
23	Jimmy Marshall	RHP	Florida State University	Yes	2009–2011	Rookie
24	Chad Kettler	SS	Coppell High School	No		
25	Richie Shaffer	3B	Providence High School	No; Rays-2012	2012–2019	MLB
26	Alex McRee	LHP	University of Georgia	No; Dodgers-2010	2010	Rookie
27	Brian Johnson	LHP	Cocoa Beach High School	No; Red Sox-2012	2012–2021	MLB
28	Bobby Hernandez	RHP	Barry University	Yes	2009	Rookie
29	Shawn Payne	2B	Middle Georgia College	No; Giants-2011	2011–2017	Rookie
30	Nick Gaudí	RHP	Pepperdine University	Yes	2009–2011	A
31	Austin King	CF	Jackson State Community College	Yes	2009–2010	Rookie
32	Graham Miller	LHP	The Master's College	Yes	2009–2011	Rookie
33	Steve Cilladi	C	Kansas Wesleyan University	Yes	2009–2013	AAA
34	Justin Dignelli	RHP	George Washington University	Yes	2009–2010	Rookie
35	David Iden	2B	California Lutheran University	Yes	2009–2011	A
36	Kevin Childs	RHP	Culver–Stockton College	Yes	2009	Rookie
37	Joel Effertz	RHP	Ladysmith High School	No; Marlins-2013	2013–2014	AA
38	Kirby Pellant	2B	Corona del Sol High School	No; Angels-2013	2013–2014	A
39	Ryan Hander	RHP	Lincoln High School	No		
40	Ryan Christenson	LHP	South Mountain Community College	No; Dodgers-2010	2010–2011	A
41	Chris Handke	RHP	Cornell College	Yes	2009–2011	Rookie
42	Tony Renda	SS	Serra High School	No; Nationals-2012	2012–2019	MLB
43	Chad Fortenberry	C	Northshore High School	No		
44	R. C. Orlan	LHP	Deep Run High School	No; Nationals-2013	2013–2019	AAA
45	Stephen Piscotty	SS	Amador Valley High School	No; Cardinals-2012	2012–2024	MLB
46	Cooper Smith	2B	Second Baptist School	No		
47	Cole Pembroke	LF	Desert Vista High School	No		
48	Travis Burnside	CF	Laurens District 55 High School	No		
49	Christian Walker	3B	Kennedy-Kenrick Catholic High School	No; Orioles-2012	2012–present	MLB
50	David Garcia	SS	Kennedy High School	No		
