= 2009 National League Championship Series =

Team (Wins)	Managers	Season
Philadelphia Phillies (4)	Charlie Manuel	93–69 (.574), GA: 6
Los Angeles Dodgers (1)	Joe Torre	95–67 (.586), GA: 3
- Dates: October 15–21
- MVP: Ryan Howard (Philadelphia)
- Umpires: Randy Marsh (crew chief), Gary Cederstrom, Tom Hallion, Ted Barrett, Bruce Dreckman, Sam Holbrook

Broadcast
- Television: TBS
- TV announcers: Chip Caray, Ron Darling, Buck Martinez, and Craig Sager
- Radio: ESPN (national); KABC-AM (Dodgers); WPHT-AM (Phillies)
- Radio announcers: Dan Shulman and Dave Campbell (ESPN); Vin Scully, Charley Steiner, and Rick Monday (KABC); Tom McCarthy, Scott Franzke, Larry Andersen, Gary Matthews, and Chris Wheeler (WPHT)
- NLDS: Los Angeles Dodgers over St. Louis Cardinals (3–0); Philadelphia Phillies over Colorado Rockies (3–1)

The 2009 National League Championship Series (NLCS) was a best-of-seven baseball game series in Major League Baseball’s 2009 postseason pitting the top-seeded Los Angeles Dodgers against the defending World Series champion and second-seeded Philadelphia Phillies for the National League Championship and the right to represent the National League in the 2009 World Series. The Phillies defeated the Dodgers four games to one. Los Angeles, whose NL-best 95–67 record topped Philadelphia's 93–69 record, retained home-field advantage. The series, the 40th in league history, began on October 15 and finished on October 21. TBS carried the championship on television.

In the regular season, the teams played seven games and the Dodgers won four of them, outscoring the Phillies 26–25. In the NLCS, the Phillies won the series, four games to one, advancing to the World Series for the second consecutive year. They were, however, defeated by the New York Yankees, 4–2.

This was the second consecutive NLCS between the Dodgers and Phillies and the fifth overall. The first two meetings were won by the Dodgers in 1977 and 1978, and the third by the Phillies in 1983; none of the three resulted in a World Series Championship by either team. The Phillies defeated the Dodgers in five games in 2008 en route to their 2008 World Series title. This match-up is the most frequent in the history of the NLCS (as of 2009) tied with the Pirates vs. Reds. This was the first time in LCS history that two franchises met in consecutive League Championship Series on separate occasions (1977–1978, 2008–2009).

== Summary ==
=== Los Angeles Dodgers vs. Philadelphia Phillies ===
Philadelphia won the series, 4–1.

Game	Date	Score	Location	Time	Attendance
1	October 15	Philadelphia Phillies – 8, Los Angeles Dodgers – 6	Dodger Stadium	4:02	56,000
2	October 16	Philadelphia Phillies – 1, Los Angeles Dodgers – 2	Dodger Stadium	3:05	56,000
3	October 18	Los Angeles Dodgers – 0, Philadelphia Phillies – 11	Citizens Bank Park	3:12	45,721
4	October 19	Los Angeles Dodgers – 4, Philadelphia Phillies – 5	Citizens Bank Park	3:44	46,157
5	October 21	Los Angeles Dodgers – 4, Philadelphia Phillies – 10	Citizens Bank Park	3:40	46,214

== Game summaries ==
=== Game 1 ===
October 15, 2009 5:07 pm (PDT) at Dodger Stadium in Los Angeles, California 78 °F (26 °C), clear
Team	1	2	3	4	5	6	7	8	9	R	H	E
Philadelphia	0	0	0	0	5	0	0	3	0	8	8	1
Los Angeles	0	1	0	0	3	0	0	2	0	6	14	0
WP: Cole Hamels (1–0) LP: Clayton Kershaw (0–1) Sv: Brad Lidge (1); Home runs: PHI: Carlos Ruiz (1), Raúl Ibañez (1); LAD: James Loney (1), Manny Ramírez (1); Attendance: 56,000; Boxscore

James Loney gave the Dodgers an early lead with a solo home run in the second inning. Dodger starter Clayton Kershaw was solid through the first four innings, but the Phillies got to him in the fifth, scoring five runs on three hits on a Carlos Ruiz three-run home run, and later a Ryan Howard two-RBI double. The Dodgers made up most of the deficit in the bottom half of the fifth when Andre Ethier reached base on a Chase Utley throwing error that scored Russell Martin, immediately followed by a Manny Ramirez two-run home run. With the Phillies ahead by one run in the top of the eighth, Philadelphia outfielder Raúl Ibañez padded his team's lead with a three-run home run off George Sherrill, his former teammate in Seattle, after two leadoff walks. The Dodgers scored two runs in the bottom half of the eighth on Martin's RBI single and a Rafael Furcal sacrifice fly, but Ryan Madson shut down the eighth-inning rally and Brad Lidge, despite allowing a hit and a walk, pitched a scoreless ninth to earn the save.

=== Game 2 ===
October 16, 2009 1:07 pm (PDT) at Dodger Stadium in Los Angeles, California 93 °F (34 °C), sunny
Team	1	2	3	4	5	6	7	8	9	R	H	E
Philadelphia	0	0	0	1	0	0	0	0	0	1	4	1
Los Angeles	0	0	0	0	0	0	0	2	X	2	5	0
WP: Hong-Chih Kuo (1–0) LP: Chan Ho Park (0–1) Sv: Jonathan Broxton (1); Home runs: PHI: Ryan Howard (1); LAD: None; Attendance: 56,000; Boxscore

Game 2 featured a pitching duel between Vicente Padilla and Pedro Martinez, two pitchers who were not even on their respective teams' Opening Day rosters. Martinez pitched seven innings of scoreless ball and Padilla nearly matched him with 7 1/3 of one-run ball. The only run came on a Ryan Howard solo shot in the fourth. That RBI gave Howard six for the postseason, which tied the record for a span of six post-season games. However, in the eighth the Phillies bullpen ran into trouble when Casey Blake singled to start off the inning and Ronnie Belliard bunted for a hit. On a 3–2 pitch Russell Martin grounded into a tailor-made double play to Pedro Feliz, but Chase Utley threw the ball away which allowed the Dodgers' first run of the game. It was Utley's third error in three games (he had a crucial error against the Rockies in Game 4 of the 2009 NLDS, allowing them to rally); he had just three in 156 games during the 2009 regular season. Scott Eyre relieved Chan Ho Park and allowed a single to Jim Thome. Ryan Madson then walked Rafael Furcal to load the bases and struck out Matt Kemp, but Andre Ethier drew a walk-off of J. A. Happ which scored the go-ahead run to win the game for the Dodgers. Five relievers were used in the bottom of the eighth. Jonathan Broxton closed out the game and the Dodgers evened the series 1–1.

=== Game 3 ===
October 18, 2009 8:07 pm (EDT) at Citizens Bank Park in Philadelphia, Pennsylvania 48 °F (9 °C), mostly cloudy
Team	1	2	3	4	5	6	7	8	9	R	H	E
Los Angeles	0	0	0	0	0	0	0	0	0	0	3	0
Philadelphia	4	2	0	0	2	0	0	3	X	11	11	0
WP: Cliff Lee (1–0) LP: Hiroki Kuroda (0–1); Home runs: LAD: None; PHI: Jayson Werth (1), Shane Victorino (1); Attendance: 45,721; Boxscore

Philadelphia jumped out early against Hiroki Kuroda in the first from the two-run triple by Ryan Howard. The next batter, Jayson Werth, hit a two-run shot into the hedges behind the center-field fence. Next inning, Carlos Ruiz hit a leadoff double and scored on Jimmy Rollins's one-out double to knock Kuroda out of the game. Scott Elbert in relief walked two to load the bases before Howard's groundout made it 6–0 Phillies. They added two more runs in the fifth off of Chad Billingsley when Raul Ibanez walked with two outs and scored on a triple by Pedro Feliz, who then scored on a Carlos Ruiz single. Three more were added in the eighth thanks to a three-run homer by Shane Victorino off of Ronald Belisario. Pitcher Cliff Lee held the Dodgers to three hits and had ten strikeouts in eight innings of work. With the large lead in hand, Lee batted in the bottom of the eighth stroking a single and scoring on the Victorino home run, but he did not start the ninth inning. Chad Durbin retired the Dodgers in order that inning to give the Phillies a 2–1 series lead.

=== Game 4 ===
October 19, 2009 8:07 pm (EDT) at Citizens Bank Park in Philadelphia, Pennsylvania 47 °F (8 °C), clear
Team	1	2	3	4	5	6	7	8	9	R	H	E
Los Angeles	0	0	0	2	1	1	0	0	0	4	8	0
Philadelphia	2	0	0	0	0	1	0	0	2	5	5	1
WP: Brad Lidge (1–0) LP: Jonathan Broxton (0–1); Home runs: LAD: Matt Kemp (1); PHI: Ryan Howard (2); Attendance: 46,157; Boxscore

The Phillies once again jumped out to an early lead in the first inning when Ryan Howard hit a two-run home run off Dodgers starter Randy Wolf. As a result, Howard tied Lou Gehrig's record of most consecutive postseason games with an RBI, at eight. The Dodgers tied the game in the top of the fourth inning when Phillies starter Joe Blanton allowed RBI singles to James Loney and Russell Martin. The Dodgers took the lead in the fifth inning on a Matt Kemp solo home run, and tacked on another run in the sixth on an RBI hit by Casey Blake to make it 4–2. Chase Utley answered in the bottom of the sixth with an RBI single of his own, cutting the Dodger lead to 4–3, which is where it would stand until the ninth inning. Jonathan Broxton, trying to work a four-out save for the Dodgers, retired Raúl Ibañez to start the ninth inning. He then walked Matt Stairs and hit Carlos Ruiz. After a Greg Dobbs line out to third base, Jimmy Rollins stepped to the plate with runners on first and second base with two outs. On a 1–1 count, Rollins hit a line drive into the right-center field gap, easily scoring pinch runner Eric Bruntlett and Ruiz, giving the Phillies a 5–4 walk-off win. It was later reported that Manny Ramirez hit the showers before the game was over.

=== Game 5 ===
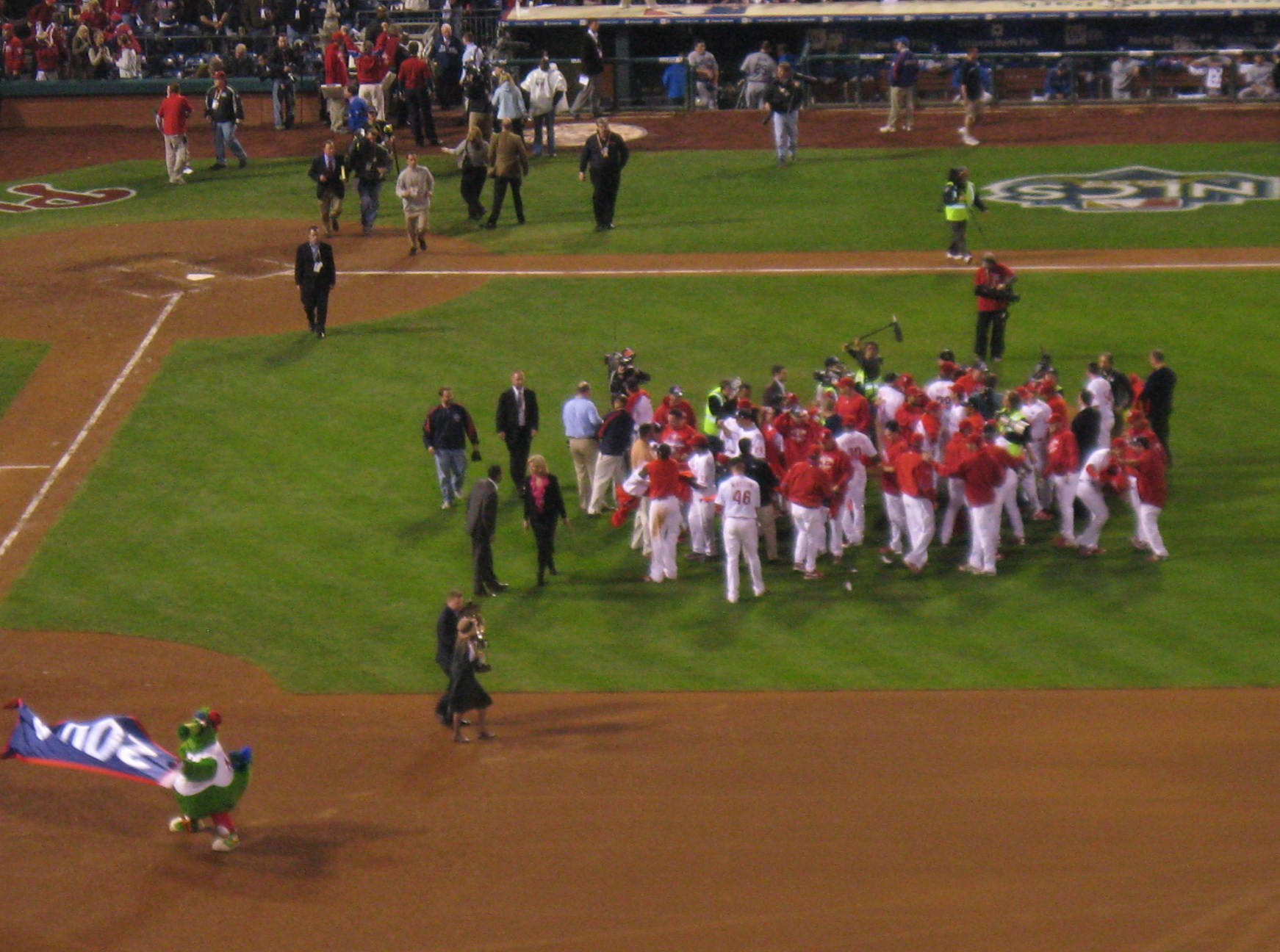
Philadelphia Phillies celebrate after their 10–4 win against the Los Angeles Dodgers.

October 21, 2009 8:07 pm (EDT) at Citizens Bank Park in Philadelphia, Pennsylvania 63 °F (17 °C), partly cloudy
Team	1	2	3	4	5	6	7	8	9	R	H	E
Los Angeles	1	1	0	0	1	0	0	1	0	4	8	0
Philadelphia	3	1	0	2	0	2	1	1	X	10	8	0
WP: Chad Durbin (1–0) LP: Vicente Padilla (0–1); Home runs: LAD: Andre Ethier (1), James Loney (2), Orlando Hudson (1); PHI: Jayson Werth 2 (3), Pedro Feliz (1), Shane Victorino (2); Attendance: 46,214; Boxscore

The Dodgers went up 1–0 in the first inning after Cole Hamels gave up a solo home run to Andre Ethier. The Phillies came right back in the bottom of the first after Jayson Werth deposited a three-run home run into the right field seats off of Vicente Padilla. In the second, James Loney's leadoff home run made it 3–2 Phillies, but in the bottom half, Pedro Feliz's leadoff home run gave the Phillies that run back. In the fourth, Jayson Werth hit a leadoff single and scored on Raul Ibanez's double, knocking Padilla out of the game. A walk and hit-by-pitch from Ramon Troncoso loaded the bases. George Sherrill hit Shane Victorino with a pitch to force in another run. Orlando Hudson's home run in the fifth made it 6–3 Phillies and Rafael Furcal's double knocked Hamels out of the game. In the sixth, Victorino's home run after a hit-by-pitch off of Clayton Kershaw made it 8–3 Phillies. Jayson Werth's home run next inning off of Hong-Chih Kuo made it 9–3 Phillies. In the eighth, Chan Ho Park allowed two leadoff singles, then Ryan Madson walked Manny Ramirez to load the bases with no outs before Matt Kemp's RBI single made it 9–4 Phillies. Madson, though, retired the next three batters to end the inning and the Phillies got that run back in the bottom half when Chase Utley scored on a wild pitch from Ronald Belisario. Brad Lidge retired the Dodgers in order in the ninth to seal the Phillies' 10–4 win and advance them to the World Series. This marked the seventh straight postseason loss for the Dodgers in Philadelphia dating back to the 1983 NLCS.

=== Composite box ===
2009 NLCS (4–1): Philadelphia Phillies over Los Angeles Dodgers

Team	1	2	3	4	5	6	7	8	9	R	H	E
Philadelphia Phillies	9	3	0	3	7	3	1	7	2	35	36	3
Los Angeles Dodgers	1	2	0	2	5	1	0	5	0	16	38	0
Total attendance: 250,092 Average attendance: 50,018

== Aftermath ==
On the eve of Game 1 of the 2009 National League Championship Series, it was announced that Dodgers’ owners Frank and Jamie McCourt would be separating after nearly 30 years of marriage. The McCourts had owned the team since 2004 and had seen the team reach the playoffs four times. The day after the series ended, CEO Jamie McCourt was fired and filed for divorce soon after. The messy divorce eventually led to a dispute over ownership control that would culminate in a major moment in Los Angeles Dodgers history, as it set in motion for Guggenheim Baseball Management to buy the team in 2012 for $2.15 billion. Since 2013, the Guggenheim's first full year as owners, the Dodgers have appeared in the playoffs every year, winning three World Series. Meanwhile, the Phillies would go on to lose the World Series against the New York Yankees a few weeks later after the NLCS. They continued to have success until 2011, but hampered with large contracts and declining performance from aging players, they began a long rebuild in the mid 2010s, and did not make the postseason again until 2022.

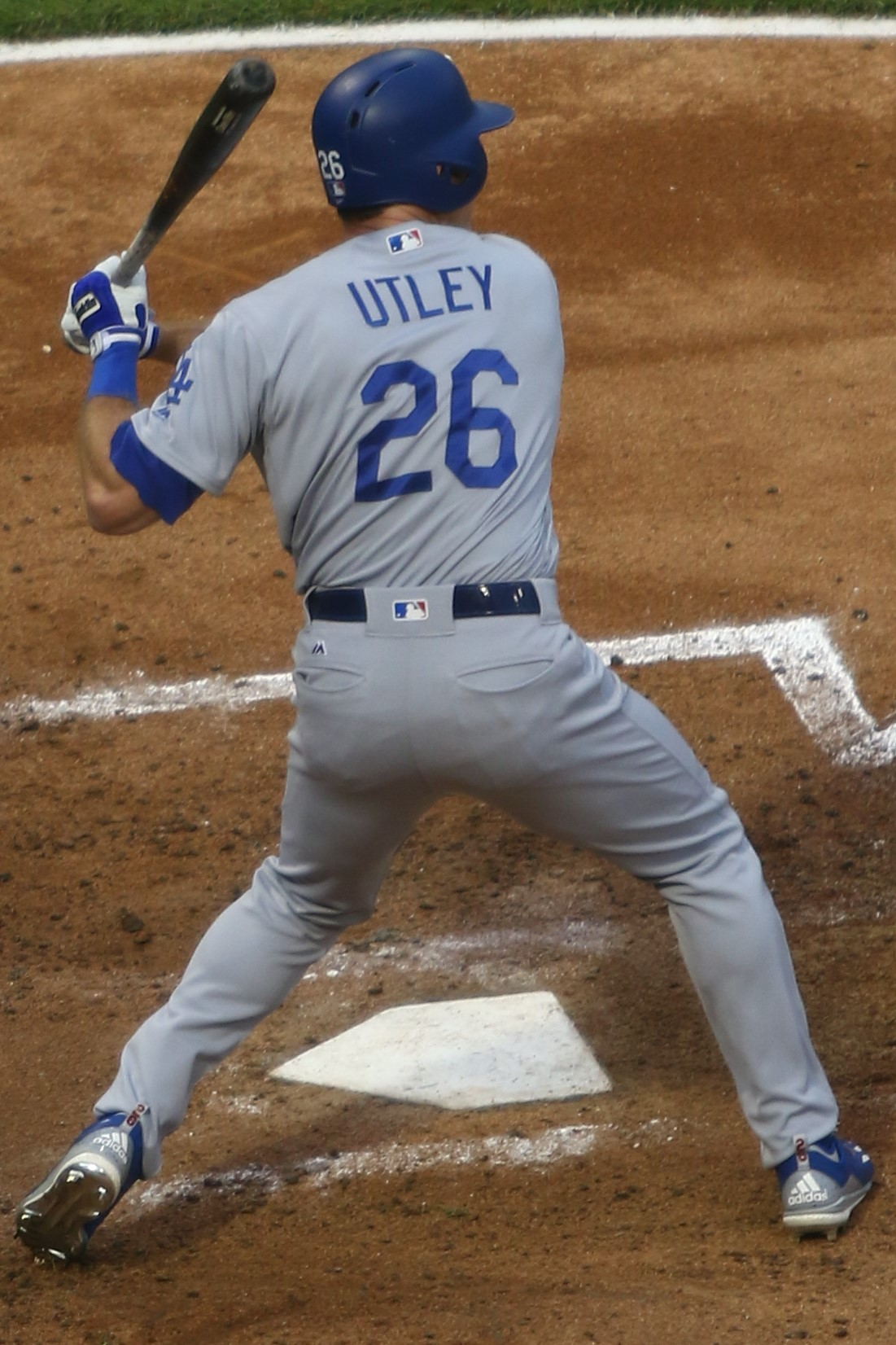
Chase Utley at bat for the 2017 Los Angeles Dodgers

Numerous 2008–2009 Philadelphia Phillies would eventually be traded to or signed with the Dodgers in the years afterwards:

- Shane Victorino, who was originally a Dodgers farmhand, was traded back to Los Angeles at the 2012 trade deadline, while Joe Blanton was traded there a few days later in a separate waiver trade. Both Victorino and Blanton only spent a few months with the team before becoming free agents.
- Jimmy Rollins would end his 14-year stay with the Phillies after he was traded to the Dodgers during the 2014–2015 off-season, spending only one season with the team. By this time, the Phillies had committed fully to re-building the roster and getting younger. Because of this, Long Beach Poly and UCLA alum Chase Utley was traded to the Dodgers at the waiver trade deadline in 2015, reuniting the double-play duo of Rollins and Utley. Utley was the longest tenured Phillie-to-Dodger player (2015–2018) and he was credited with helping in the development of a young Corey Seager, while bring a much-needed toughness to the team.
- During the 2015–2016 off-season, Joe Blanton re-joined the Dodgers, this time as a reliever where he experienced a surprising amount of success before struggling mightily during the 2016 National League Championship Series. Also in 2016, Carlos Ruiz was sent to Los Angeles in another waiver deadline deal. Ruiz backed up Yasmani Grandal and caught the final out of the 2016 National League Division Series.
- 2009 Phillies stellar set-up man Ryan Madson was traded from Washington to the Dodgers in 2018 in another waiver trade.
- To help bolster a fatigued pitching staff, the Dodgers signed 2008 NLCS MVP and SoCal native Cole Hamels in-season in August 2021, though he would never throw a pitch for the team as he injured himself a few weeks upon signing.
- Off the field, Raul Ibanez would join the Dodgers front office as a special assistant to the President of Baseball Operations, Andrew Friedman, in 2016.

Despite his accomplishments and success in the late 2000s, Jonathan Broxton's costly blown saves in Game 4 of the 2008 and 2009 National League Championship Series proved to be career defining. Broxton had an excellent first half of the season in 2010 and was selected to the 2010 Major League Baseball All-Star Game, in which he recorded the save for the National League. However, he faded in the second half, beginning with a four-run blown save against the New York Yankees in a prime-time game on ESPN's Sunday Night Baseball at Dodger Stadium. In somewhat of a repeat performance against the Phillies, he blew another four-run lead on August 12, a game which put a dent in the Dodgers chances at a third straight National League West crown. Broxton returned to the closer role at the start of the 2011 season and appeared in 14 games in March and April and produced a disappointing 5.68 ERA and 7 saves. He was later shut down for the season due to shoulder tightness and became a free agent at season's end. Broxton bounced around the league until 2017 and enjoyed moderate success; however, he would never regain the dominance he showed in the late 2000s.

The Dodgers won the next meeting between the two teams in 2025, which tied the all-time postseason series at 3 apiece.
