= 2004 Eastern League season =

The 2004 Eastern League season began on approximately April 1 and the regular season ended on approximately September 1.

The New Hampshire Fisher Cats defeated the Altoona Curve 3 games to 0 to win the Eastern League Championship Series.

== Regular season ==
=== Standings ===
Eastern League - Northern Division
Team	Win	Loss	%	GB
**New Hampshire Fisher Cats**	84	57	.596	–
Binghamton Mets	76	66	.535	8.5
New Britain Rock Cats	70	70	.500	13.5
Portland Sea Dogs	69	73	.486	15.5
Norwich Navigators	69	73	.486	15.5
Trenton Thunder	64	78	.451	20.5

Eastern League - Southern Division
Team	Win	Loss	%	GB
**Altoona Curve**	85	56	.603	–
Erie SeaWolves	80	62	.563	5.5
Bowie Baysox	73	69	.514	12.5
Reading Phillies	64	77	.454	21.0
Akron Aeros	63	78	.447	22.0
Harrisburg Senators	52	90	.366	33.5

Notes:

Green shade indicates that team advanced to the playoffs
Bold indicates that team advanced to ELCS
Italics indicates that team won ELCS

=== Statistical league leaders ===
==== Batting leaders ====
Stat	Player	Total
AVG	Jeff Keppinger (Altoona Curve and Binghamton Mets)	.341
HR	Mitch Jones (Trenton Thunder)	39
RBI	Ryan Howard (Reading Phillies)	102
R	Nate McLouth (Altoona Curve)	93

==== Pitching leaders ====
Stat	Player	Total
W	Gustavo Chacín (New Hampshire Fisher Cats)	16
ERA	Gavin Floyd (Reading Phillies)	2.57
SO	Boof Bonser (New Britain Rock Cats)	146
SV	Bobby Korecky (New Britain Rock Cats)	31

== Playoffs ==
=== Divisional Series ===
==== Northern Division ====
The New Hampshire Fisher Cats defeated the Binghamton Mets in the Northern Division playoffs 3 games to 1.

==== Southern Division ====
The Altoona Curve defeated the Erie SeaWolves in the Southern Division playoffs 3 games to 0.

=== Championship Series ===
The New Hampshire Fisher Cats defeated the Altoona Curve in the ELCS 3 games to 0.
