= New Ulm High School =

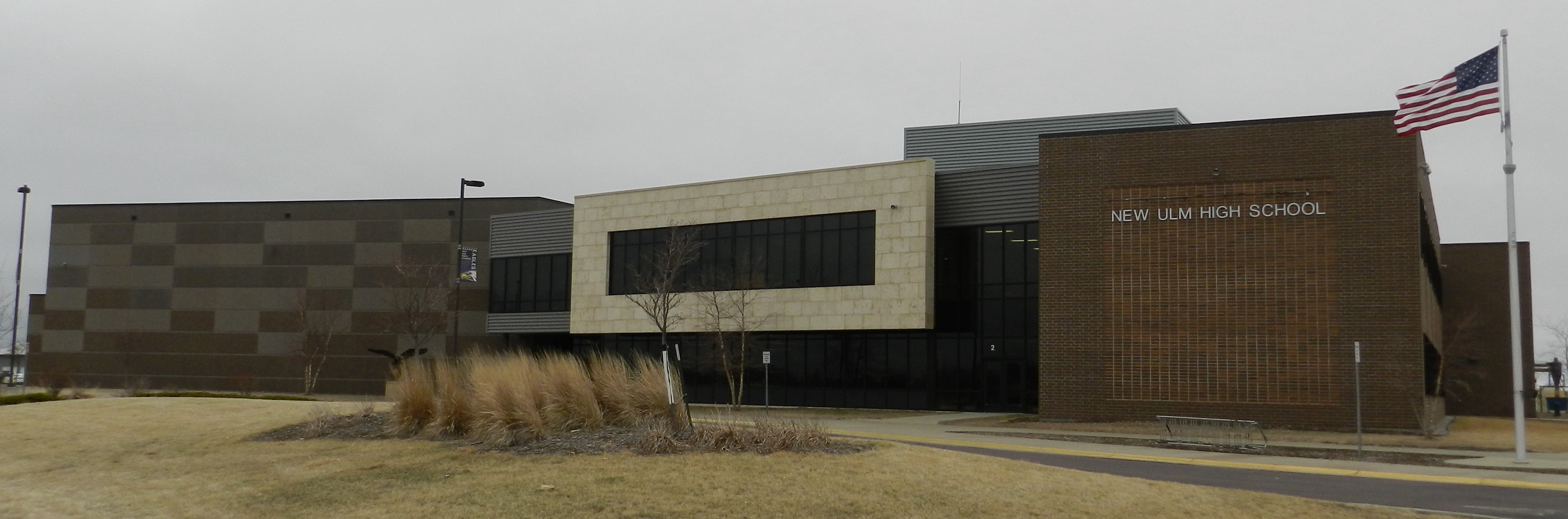

Location
- 1600 Oak Street; New Ulm, Minnesota 56073; United States; 44°19′2″N 94°28′7″W

Information
- Other name: NUHS
- Type: Public high school
- Established: 1857
- School district: New Ulm Public Schools
- NCES School ID: 272349001153
- Principal: Mark Bergmann
- Teaching staff: 38.01 (on an FTE basis)
- Grades: 9–12
- Enrollment: 712 (2023-2024)
- Student to teacher ratio: 18.73
- Colors: Purple and White
- Athletics conference: Big South Conference
- Nickname: Eagles
- Website: newulm.k12.mn.us/high-school/

New Ulm High School (NUHS) is a public high school in New Ulm, Minnesota, United States. It is part of the New Ulm Public Schools district.

== History ==
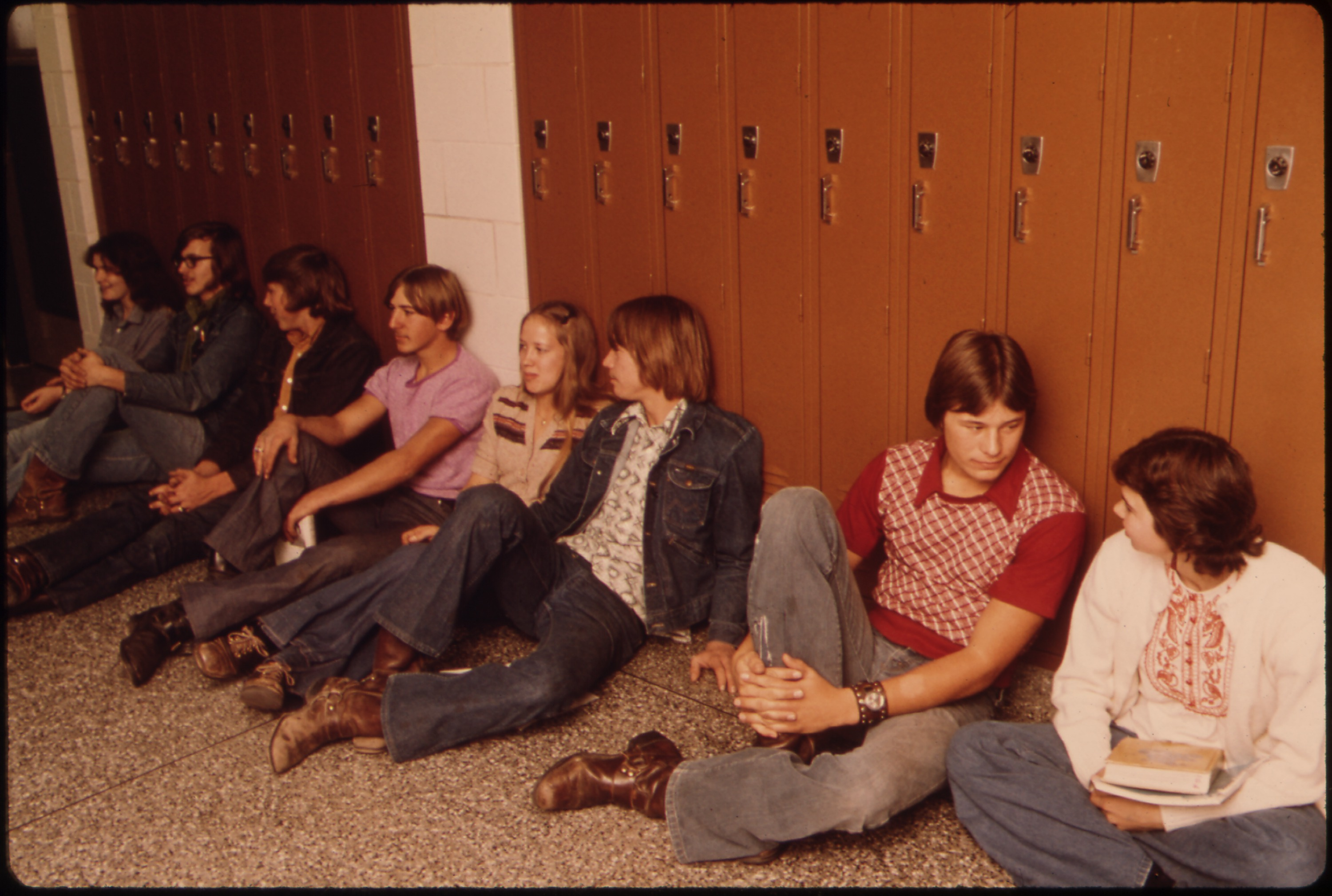
Students resting in a hall, 1974

Due to budget cuts for school funding from the state in 2007, the New Ulm Middle School had to shut down, and shared space with the New Ulm High School until 2016. A new high school was built and opened in the fall of 2016 after a referendum was passed in 2014. The other district buildings were remodeled and the old high school became the middle school. The original 1915 high school building was listed on the National Register of Historic Places in 2015.

== Events and organizations ==
Student organizations include Speech, Math Counts, Knowledge Bowl, Junior High Knowledge Bowl, Robotics, One Act, SPOTS, Student Council, FFA, FCCLA, Oak Street Singers, Jazz Band, Choir, Band, Pops Choir, Mock Trial, and Yearbook.

== Sports ==
New Ulm High School competes in the Big South Conference.

== Notable alumni ==
- Ali Bernard - American Female Wrestler
- Wanda Gag - American Artist
- Jamie Hoffmann - Former MLB Player
- Terry Steinbach - Former MLB Player and Coach
