= Jamie Hoffmann =

American baseball player (born 1984)

- Outfielder
- Born: August 20, 1984 (age 41); New Ulm, Minnesota, U.S.
- Batted: Right Threw: Right

MLB debut
- May 22, 2009, for the Los Angeles Dodgers

Last MLB appearance
- April 14, 2011, for the Los Angeles Dodgers

MLB statistics
- Batting average: .154
- Home runs: 1
- Runs batted in: 7
- Stats at Baseball Reference

Teams
- Los Angeles Dodgers (2009, 2011)

Jamie Richard Hoffmann (born August 20, 1984) is an American former professional baseball outfielder. He played in Major League Baseball (MLB) for the Los Angeles Dodgers.

== Baseball career ==
Hoffmann, a former hockey prospect selected in the 2003 NHL draft by the Carolina Hurricanes in the eighth round, was signed as an undrafted free agent by the Los Angeles Dodgers in 2003 out of New Ulm High School and assigned to the Gulf Coast League Dodgers where he was an All-Star third baseman during the 2004 season, hitting .310 for the team.

=== Los Angeles Dodgers ===
He then switched to the outfield in 2005 while playing for the Columbus Catfish and Vero Beach Dodgers. In 2007, he played for the Inland Empire 66ers of San Bernardino, and in 2008 for the Jacksonville Suns. The Dodgers added him to their 40-man roster prior to the 2009 season.

Hoffmann participated in the 2008 Arizona Fall League season with the Surprise Rafters.

He began 2009 in Double-A with the Chattanooga Lookouts and was then promoted to the Triple-A Albuquerque Isotopes. On May 22, he was called up to the Los Angeles Dodgers when reserve outfielder Xavier Paul was placed on the disabled list. He made his MLB debut, flying out as a pinch hitter, the same day.

Hoffmann's first Major League hit was a three-run home run in the 2nd inning against Matt Palmer of the Los Angeles Angels of Anaheim on May 24. He played in 14 games with the Dodgers and then was optioned back to the Minors. He was designated for assignment on September 1 and then released by the Dodgers after clearing waivers. Hoffmann was shortly re-signed and assigned back to Albuquerque.

Hoffmann was selected as the first overall pick in the Rule 5 draft by the Washington Nationals on December 10, 2009, but was immediately traded to the New York Yankees in exchange for Brian Bruney, as the player to be named later. On March 22, Hoffmann was returned to the Dodgers and assigned to the Triple-A Albuquerque Isotopes, where he hit .310 in 139 games. He was then added to the Dodgers' 40-man winter roster, which protected him from being lost in the 2010 Rule 5 draft.

Hoffmann appeared in two games with the Dodgers in April 2011 during a brief appearance in the Majors and was 0-for-4 before being optioned back to Albuquerque. With the Isotopes, he appeared in 133 games, hitting .297 with 22 home runs and 84 RBI.

=== Baltimore Orioles ===
The Colorado Rockies claimed Hoffmann off of waivers on December 5, 2011. On March 19, 2012, he was removed from the 40-man roster and sent outright to the Triple-A Colorado Springs Sky Sox, but rejected the assignment and elected free agency.

On March 31, 2012, Hoffmann signed a minor league contract with the Baltimore Orioles organization. With the Triple-A Norfolk Tides, he hit .254 in 110 games with 11 home runs and 44 RBI.

=== New York Mets ===
On November 20, 2012, Hoffmann signed a minor league contract with the New York Mets organization. With the Triple-A Las Vegas 51s in 2013, he played in 116 games and hit .277 with nine home runs and 56 RBI.

== Ice hockey career statistics ==
			Regular season					Playoffs
Season	Team	League	GP	G	A	Pts	PIM	GP	G	A	Pts	PIM
1999–2000	New Ulm High School	HSMN
2000–01	New Ulm High School	HSMN
2001–02	New Ulm High School	HSMN		25	32	57		—	—	—	—	—
2002–03	Des Moines Buccaneers	USHL	60	14	25	39	120	4	1	1	2	2
USHL totals			60	14	25	39	120	4	1	1	2	2

== See also ==
- Rule 5 draft results
