= Scott Elbert =

American baseball player (born 1985)

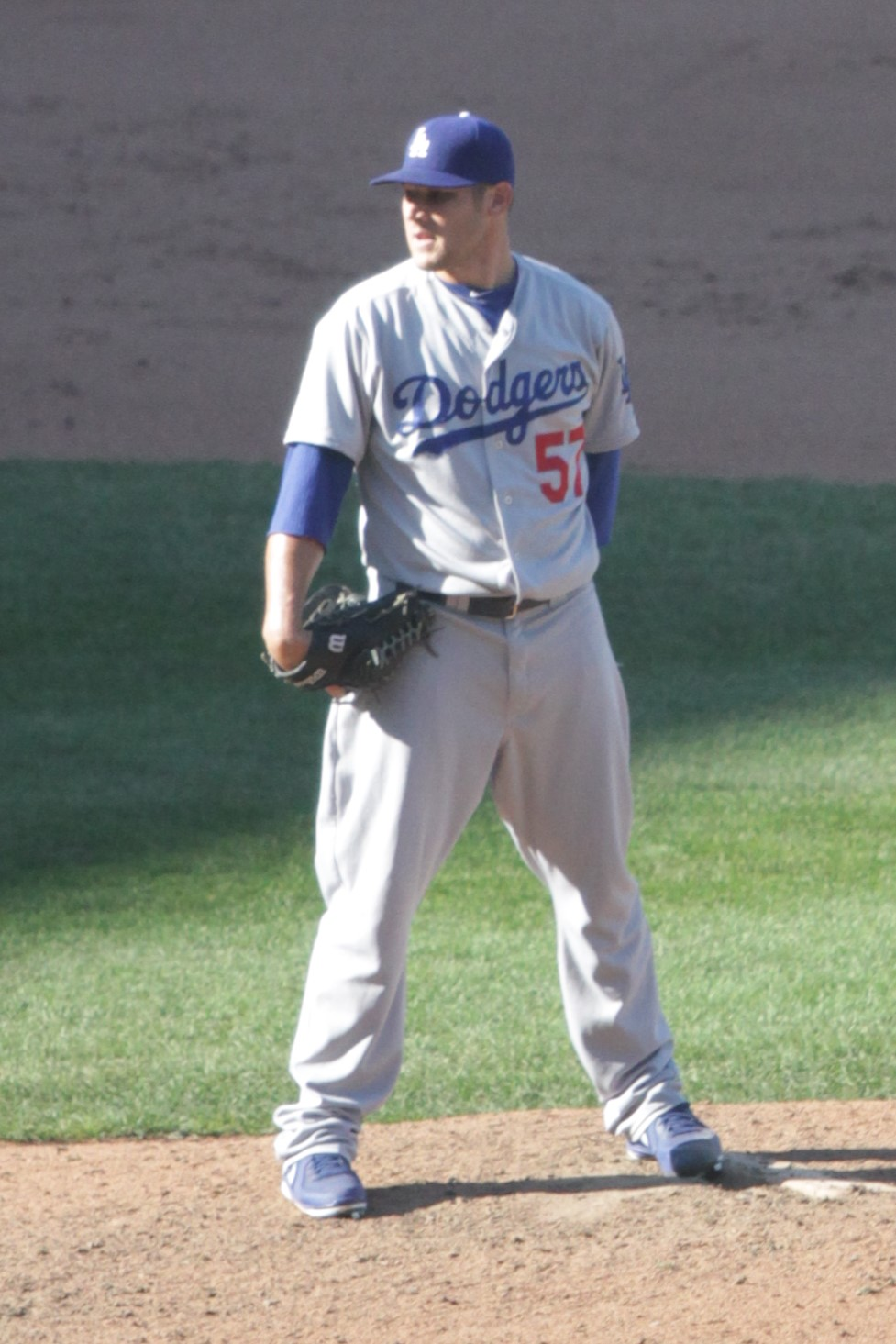
- Elbert with the Los Angeles Dodgers in 2014
- Relief pitcher
- Born: August 13, 1985 (age 41); Joplin, Missouri, U.S.
- Batted: Left Threw: Left

MLB debut
- August 29, 2008, for the Los Angeles Dodgers

Last MLB appearance
- September 27, 2014, for the Los Angeles Dodgers

MLB statistics
- Win–loss record: 4–3
- Earned run average: 3.54
- Strikeouts: 94
- Stats at Baseball Reference

Teams
- Los Angeles Dodgers (2008–2012, 2014)

Timothy Scott Elbert (born August 13, 1985) is an American former professional baseball pitcher. He played in Major League Baseball (MLB) for the Los Angeles Dodgers. A former first round draft pick, his career had been hampered by various arm injuries.

== Early life ==
Elbert attended Seneca High School in Seneca, Missouri, and was a standout in football and baseball. In football, he played running back and as a junior, he led the state in rushing yardage and rushing touchdowns and was named as an All-State selection.

Elbert is the school's all-time leader with an 0.94 ERA, 433 strikeouts, 29 complete games, and 238.0 innings. He is also Seneca's all-time offensive leader with 28 doubles, 10 triples, 22 homers, and 97 RBI.

== Professional career ==
=== Los Angeles Dodgers ===
Elbert was selected in the first round of the 2004 MLB draft by the Los Angeles Dodgers. He made his professional debut for the Ogden Raptors and struck out 45 batters in 49.2 innings. With the Single-A Columbus Catfish in 2005, he went 8–5 with a 2.66 ERA in 24 starts. In the 2006 season, Elbert pitched for the Vero Beach Dodgers and earned Florida State League midseason All-Star honors. He was then promoted to the Double-A Jacksonville Suns, where he went 6–4 with a 3.61 ERA and was ranked as the #3 prospect in the Southern League by Baseball America. He also ranked #11 on MinorLeagueBaseball.com's "Top 50 Prospects List.

A shoulder injury caused him to miss most of the 2007 season, but he returned in 2008 as a reliever at Jacksonville. Elbert earned his first trip to the Majors when the Dodgers called him up from the minors on August 29, 2008.

Elbert made his MLB debut on August 29, 2008, pitching two thirds of an inning against the Arizona Diamondbacks. He pitched in 10 games out of the bullpen for the Dodgers in 2008, finishing the season 0–1 with an ERA of 12.00.

Elbert spent most of 2009 in the minors and was selected as the Dodgers "Minor League Pitcher of the Year" after finishing a combined 4–4 with a 3.84 ERA in 18 starts for Double-A Chattanooga and Triple-A Albuquerque. He also appeared in 19 games in the Majors with the Dodgers, finishing 2–0 with a 5.03 ERA and appeared in relief in Game 3 of the 2009 National League Championship Series.

Elbert began 2010 as a starting pitcher for Albuquerque and was promoted to the Dodgers on May 28. He walked three left-handed batters in that game and was promptly optioned back to Triple-A. Elbert made one more start for the Isotopes before abruptly leaving the team for unspecified reasons. He eventually returned to action by pitching for the Phoenix Desert Dogs in the Arizona Fall League, where he was selected to the "Rising Stars Game".

Elbert began 2011 in the bullpen for Albuquerque and was called up to the Dodgers on May 11. Elbert pitched in 47 games for the Dodgers, mostly as a left-handed specialist. He finished with a 2.43 ERA in 33 1/3 innings with 34 strikeouts and also saved two games.

In 2012, Elbert appeared in 43 games for the Dodgers and had a 2.20 ERA in 32 2/3 innings. He also spent extended periods on the disabled list because of arm problems, which finally forced him to undergo season ending surgery in mid-September. He underwent another surgery on the elbow on January 23, 2013, due to continued pain in the area.

Due to his recovery from his injury, Elbert missed all of spring training and PRP Treatment in March delayed his intended return. He eventually began pitching in rehab games in the minors in May. Elbert seemed close to rejoining the Dodgers and as the last step in his rehab pitched in two games on consecutive days for the Chattanooga Lookouts; however, he experienced some pain in his elbow after his last appearance. An MRI exam revealed that he had a complete tear of the ulnar collateral ligament. Elbert underwent Tommy John surgery on June 10, 2013, and was ruled out for the remainder of the season.

Elbert was reinstated from the 60-day disabled list and designated for assignment by the Dodgers on July 29, 2014. He cleared waivers and was subsequently sent outright to Triple-A Albuquerque, where he appeared in 18 games and had a 4.91 ERA. The Dodgers added Elbert back to the roster and recalled him to the Majors on September 12. He pitched a scoreless inning for the Dodgers on September 13, in his first appearance on a Major League mound since August 26, 2012. Elbert appeared in seven games for the Dodgers, with a 2.08 ERA and on September 26 picked up his first win in a Major League game since July 3, 2012. After the season, the Dodgers again removed him from the 40-man roster and sent him outright to Triple-A. This time, Elbert elected to become a free agent.

=== San Diego Padres ===
On January 7, 2015, Elbert signed a minor league contract with the San Diego Padres. In 20 appearances for the Triple-A El Paso Chihuahuas, he struggled to a 6.52 ERA with 23 strikeouts across 19 1/3 innings pitched. Elbert was released by the Padres organization on June 17.

== Pitching style ==
Elbert threw just two pitches regularly: a four-seam fastball at 90–94 mph and a slider at 87–90. He threw the fastball a majority of the time against right-handed hitters, but only about half the time against left-handers. Elbert also threw a small handful of changeups to right-handers. He skewed toward throwing the slider in two-strike counts.
