= Brent Leach =

American baseball player (born 1982)

- Pitcher
- Born: November 18, 1982 (age 43); Flowood, Mississippi, U.S.
- Batted: Right Threw: Left

Professional debut
- MLB: May 6, 2009, for the Los Angeles Dodgers
- NPB: July 28, 2011, for the Yokohoma BayStars

Last appearance
- MLB: July 28, 2009, for the Los Angeles Dodgers
- NPB: September 14, 2011, for the Yokohoma BayStars

MLB statistics
- Win–loss record: 2–0
- Earned run average: 5.75
- Strikeouts: 19

NPB statistics
- Win–loss: 1–7
- Earned run average: 5.95
- Strikeouts: 36
- Stats at Baseball Reference

Teams
- Los Angeles Dodgers (2009); Yokohama BayStars (2011)

Brent Allen Leach (born November 18, 1982) is an American former professional baseball pitcher. He played in Major League Baseball for the Los Angeles Dodgers and in Nippon Professional Baseball for the Yokohama BayStars.

== Amateur career ==
Leach attended Brandon High School in Brandon, Mississippi, and played college baseball at the University of Southern Mississippi and Delta State University. During his freshman season with the Southern Miss Golden Eagles baseball team, Leach recorded sixteen appearances, with one save, a 2.08 earned run average and a .237 batting average against as a reliever. In 2003, he pitched in just four games, starting three of them before being injured. He missed the 2004 baseball season while undergoing Tommy John surgery, and transferred to Delta State, where he returned to the bullpen full-time. In his final college baseball season, Leach pitched in 24 games, managing a 1–1 record and 1.74 earned run average, with seven saves. Following an appearance with the Statesmen at the 2005 NCAA Division II Baseball Championship, Leach was drafted by the Dodgers in the sixth round of the 2005 MLB draft.

== Professional career ==
=== Los Angeles Dodgers ===
Leach made his minor league debut in 2005 with the Ogden Raptors and split 2006 with the Columbus Catfish and the Vero Beach Dodgers. In 2007, Leach played fourteen games with the Advanced A Inland Empire 66ers of San Bernardino. Leach split 2008 with the 66ers and the Double-A Jacksonville Suns.

He was added to the Dodgers 40 man roster on November 20, 2008, and earned his first major league call-up when the Dodgers promoted him from Double-A Chattanooga Lookouts on May 2, 2009.

Leach made his major league debut with one scoreless inning of relief against the Washington Nationals on May 6, 2009. He made 38 appearances out of the bullpen for the Dodgers before he was sent back to the minors on July 30. He finished the season with the AAA Albuquerque Isotopes. In 2010, he began his season with Albuquerque, but was sent back to the AA Lookouts in an attempt to convert him from a reliever to a starter. In 13 starts, he was 7–3 with a 4.57 earned run average.

=== Yokohama BayStars ===
On December 21, 2010, he was designated for assignment by the Dodgers and signed with the Yokohama BayStars of Nippon Professional Baseball.

On March 17, 2011, in the wake of the Japanese earthquake and tsunami and the resulting nuclear radiation scare, Leach left the country. He said he had no desire to return and the Nippon Baseball commissioner invoked a rare rule, placing Leach on the restricted list, the first time such a list had been used in league history.

On July 8, Yokohama announced that they were going to reinstate Leach, as he had decided to return to Japan to pitch. He issued the following statement, "I'm really grateful to get another chance to play in Japan. Even after returning to the US, I had thoughts about playing for the Bay Stars. I made some good friends here during spring camp. I want to get to Ichi-gun as quickly as I can and do my best to help the team out."

Leach made his NPB debut on July 28, taking a loss against the Yomiuri Giants. He defeated the Giants on August 12 for his first Japanese league win.

=== Return to Dodgers ===
Leach signed a minor league contract with the Dodgers in February 2012 and was sent back to Albuquerque. He was released in May after appearing in 10 games for the Isotopes.

=== Atlanta Braves ===
He signed as a free agent with the Atlanta Braves on June 21, 2012, and was assigned to the AA Mississippi Braves.

=== Milwaukee Brewers ===
Leach signed a minor league contract with the Milwaukee Brewers on July 3, 2013. He resigned with the team on December 1, 2014, and released in August 2015.
