= Mitch Jones =

American baseball player (born 1977)

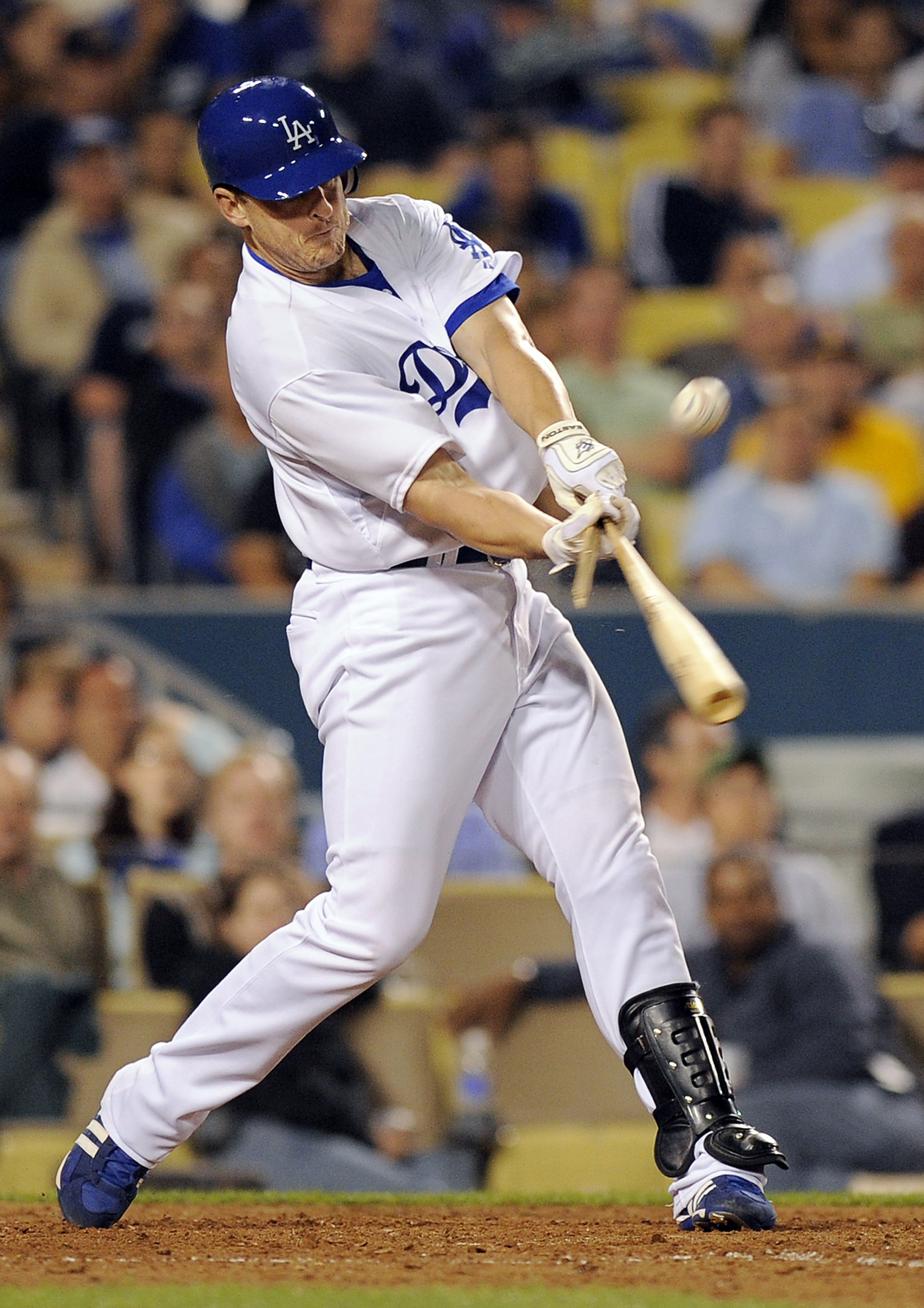
- Outfielder
- Born: October 15, 1977 (age 49); Orem, Utah, U.S.
- Batted: Right Threw: Right

MLB debut
- June 16, 2009, for the Los Angeles Dodgers

Last MLB appearance
- June 29, 2009, for the Los Angeles Dodgers

MLB statistics
- Batting average: .308
- Home runs: 0
- Runs batted in: 0
- Stats at Baseball Reference

Teams
- Hokkaido Nippon-Ham Fighters (2007–2008); Los Angeles Dodgers (2009)

Mitchell C. Jones (born October 15, 1977) is an American former professional baseball outfielder. He played in Major League Baseball for the Los Angeles Dodgers in 2009.

== Amateur career ==
Jones played ball in high school at Mountain View High School in Orem, Utah, and was drafted by the Texas Rangers in 1997 and the Baltimore Orioles in 1998 and 1999. He set a school record at Utah Valley State College (now Utah Valley University) with 41 career homers in two years, then transferred to Arizona State University. His senior year at Arizona State University he posted a .787 slugging percentage with 27 home runs (a single-season ASU record) and 92 RBI. Jones was a 2x consensus All-American in 1998 and 2000. In 1999, he played collegiate summer baseball in the Cape Cod Baseball League for the Yarmouth-Dennis Red Sox and was named a league all-star. He signed after college with the New York Yankees after being drafted in the 7th round of the 2000 Major League Baseball draft.

== Professional Baseball Career ==
=== New York Yankees ===
He worked his way through the Yankees' major league system, becoming a six-time All-Star. He started 2005 at the Yankees' Triple-A affiliate, the Columbus Clippers, where he batted .268 with 27 home runs and 79 RBIs on that year. In April, he hit for the cycle, a feat that was not repeated by a Clipper until Jason Kipnis did it in 2010. Jones won the 2001 Single-A, 2004 Double-A, and 2005 Triple-A Home Run Derby, narrowly defeating Ian Kinsler.

Jones received his first Major League call up in May 2006 by the New York Yankees.

=== Los Angeles Dodgers ===
Jones was signed to a minor league contract by the Los Angeles Dodgers prior to the start of the 2007 season and spent two months playing for the Las Vegas 51s in the Dodgers minor league system. In June 2007, he was sold by the Dodgers to the Hokkaido Nippon Ham Fighters of Japan's Pacific League. He returned to the Dodgers organization in 2008 and once more played for AAA Las Vegas.

He received a non-roster invitation to spring training by the Dodgers in 2009 but failed to make the roster and was assigned to the AAA Albuquerque Isotopes to begin the season.

On June 16, the Dodgers purchased his contract and called him up to the Major League team. He made his major league debut that night, appearing as a pinch hitter in a game against the Oakland Athletics. He struck out in his first at-bat. The next night he got his first major league hit off A's reliever Brad Ziegler after several years in the minor leagues. Two nights later on June 19, he got his first major league start against the Los Angeles Angels of Anaheim as the designated hitter.

Jones appeared in 8 games with the Dodgers, primarily as a pinch hitter. He went 4 for 13, finishing with a batting average of .308 before he was designated for assignment on July 1 and returned to the Isotopes on July 6.

In September 2009, after missing a month of the minor league season due to MLB appearances with the Los Angeles Dodgers, Jones was named the winner of the Joe Bauman Home Run Award, for the most home runs — 35 — in all of Minor League Baseball. Jones finished the season batting .297, 103 RBI and 35 HR.

=== Atlanta Braves ===
On December 17, 2009, Jones signed a minor league contract with the Atlanta Braves.

=== Pittsburgh Pirates ===
On July 30, 2010, Jones was acquired by the Pittsburgh Pirates for cash considerations. He played for the Pirates AAA team, the Indianapolis Indians.
