= Ramón Troncoso =

Dominican baseball player & coach (born 1983)

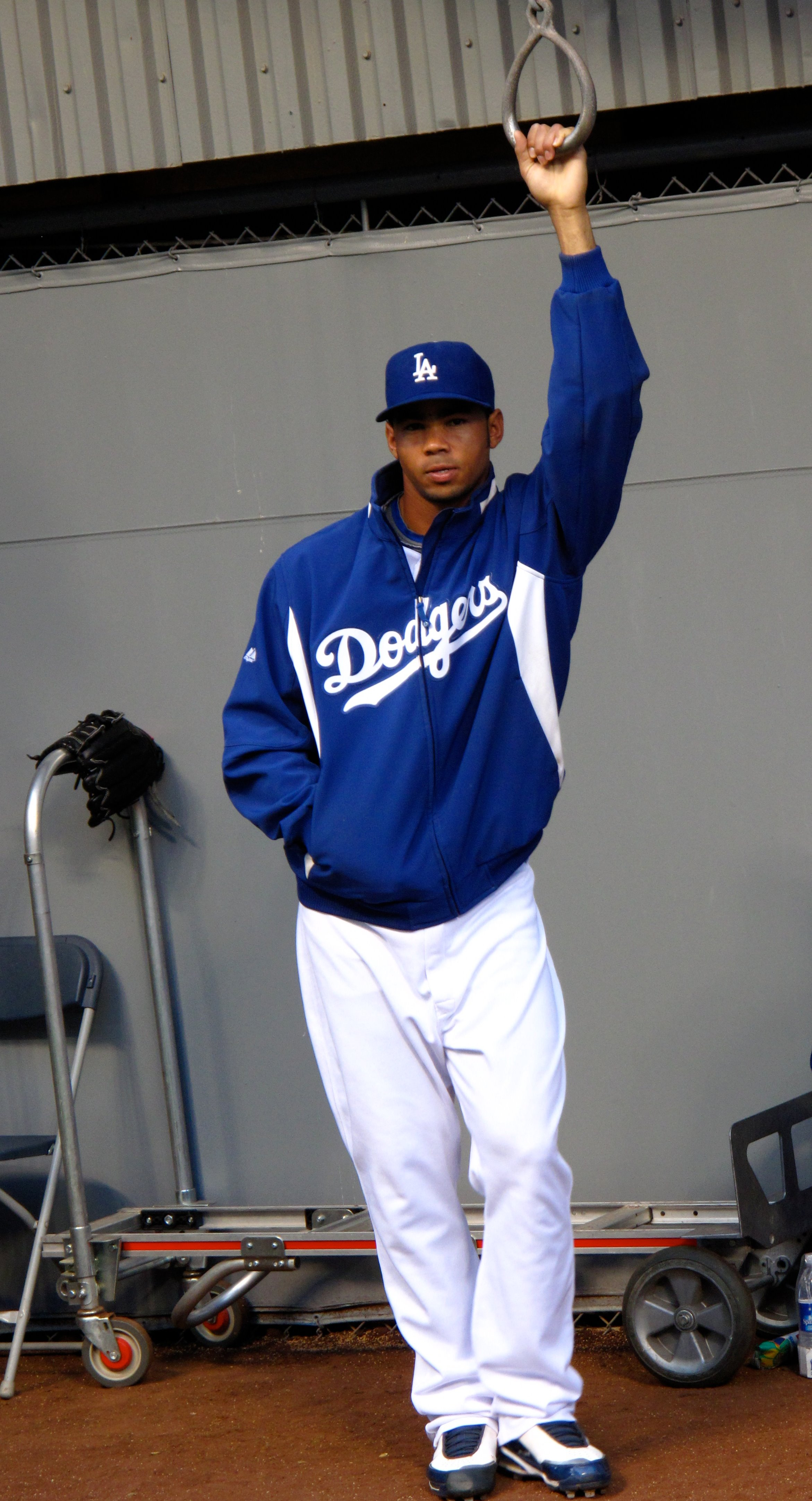
- Troncoso with the Los Angeles Dodgers
- Relief pitcher
- Born: February 16, 1983 (age 43); San José de Ocoa, Dominican Republic
- Batted: Right Threw: Right

MLB debut
- April 1, 2008, for the Los Angeles Dodgers

Last MLB appearance
- September 29, 2013, for the Chicago White Sox

MLB statistics
- Win–loss record: 9–12
- Earned run average: 4.00
- Strikeouts: 159
- Stats at Baseball Reference

Teams
- Los Angeles Dodgers (2008–2011); Chicago White Sox (2013)

Ramón Landestoy Troncoso (born February 16, 1983) is a Dominican former professional baseball pitcher. He played in Major League Baseball (MLB) for the Los Angeles Dodgers and Chicago White Sox.

== Playing career ==
=== Los Angeles Dodgers ===
Troncoso signed as an undrafted free agent by the Los Angeles Dodgers on June 20, 2002, Troncoso played his first three professional seasons for the Dominican Summer League Dodgers.

In 2005, Troncoso was sent to the rookie-level Ogden Raptors, where he led the team in saves with 13. He pitched for the Single-A Columbus Catfish and the High-A Vero Beach Dodgers in 2006, and was ranked as the 22nd best prospect in the Dodger organization by Baseball America. With Vero Beach he went 1-3 with a 6.75 ERA and 31 strikeouts in 18 appearances. Troncoso pitched in 23 games, going 4-0 with 15 saves and a 2.41 ERA with Columbus, tossing seven hitless frames with five strikeouts during his final six outings.

Troncoso split the 2007 season between the Single-A Inland Empire 66ers of San Bernardino and the Double-A Jacksonville Suns. He was added to the Dodgers' 40-man roster after the season, in order to be protected from the Rule 5 draft. Troncoso made his Major League Debut on April 1, 2008, for the Dodgers against the San Francisco Giants. He pitched to one batter and induced an inning-ending double-play. Troncoso split the season between the Triple-A Las Vegas 51s and the Dodgers. He finished the 2008 season with a record of 1-1 and a 4.26 ERA with 38 strikeouts in 32 relief appearances for the Dodgers.

In 2009 Troncoso spent the entire season with the Dodgers, working in a team high 73 games and finishing 5-4 with a 2.72 ERA. In 2010, he appeared in 52 games with the Dodgers, though he was briefly reassigned to Triple-A midway through the season. Overall, Troncoso was 2-3 with a 4.33 ERA and 34 strikeouts.

To begin 2011, Troncoso joined the Triple-A Albuquerque Isotopes. However, on April 16, he was recalled from the minors when Hong-Chih Kuo was placed on the disabled list. He was optioned back to the minors five days later after allowing 12 hits in 2 2/3 innings pitched. He spent most of the season with the Isotopes, pitching in 35 games with a 2-4 record and 5.05 ERA before rejoining the Dodgers in September. With the Dodgers, Troncoso appeared in 18 games and struggled to a 6.75 ERA with 14 strikeouts. Troncoso was designated for assignment by Los Angeles on March 22, 2012. He spent the entire 2012 season in Albuquerque and was 4-1 with a 6.67 ERA and 40 strikeouts in 45 games.

=== Chicago White Sox ===
On November 12, 2012, Troncoso a minor league contract with the Chicago White Sox organization. Troncoso was called up from the minors June 7, 2013 - to provide depth in the White Sox bullpen after numerous injuries to the pitching staff. In 29 appearances for Chicago, he posted a 1-4 record and 4.50 ERA with 18 strikeouts over 30 innings of work. On October 4, Troncoso was removed from the 40-man roster and sent outright to the Triple-A Charlotte Knights.

=== Kansas City Royals ===
Troncoso signed a minor league deal with the Kansas City Royals on March 14, 2014, and was released from the club on July 21 after appearing in 24 games with a 1-6 record and 4.30 ERA for the Omaha Storm Chasers.

=== Los Angeles Dodgers (second stint) ===
Troncoso signed a minor league contract with the Los Angeles Dodgers on February 5, 2015. He was subsequently assigned to the Double-A Tulsa Drillers to start the season. After two appearances in Tulsa, Troncoso was promoted to the Triple-A Oklahoma City Dodgers, where he was 5–1 with a 1.98 ERA with 21 strikeouts in 29 games (including two starts).

=== Leones de Yucatán ===
Troncoso signed with the Leones de Yucatán of the Mexican League on March 29, 2016. In 19 appearances for Yucatán, he logged a 1-1 record and 3.00 ERA with 21 strikeouts and 7 saves over 18 innings of relief. Troncoso was released by the Leones on May 15.

=== Olmecas de Tabasco ===
On May 27, 2016, Troncoso signed with the Olmecas de Tabasco of the Mexican League. In 27 games for Tabasco, he recorded an 0.64 ERA with 22 strikeouts and 12 saves across 28 innings pitched.

Troncoso made two scoreless appearances for Tabasco in 2017 before he was released on April 11, 2017.

== Coaching career ==
In January 2018, it was announced that Troncoso had taken a job as a pitching coach for the Dodgers Dominican Summer League affiliate. He was promoted to the Single–A Rancho Cucamonga Quakes in 2021.

On February 6, 2026, Troncoso was announced as the pitching coach for Los Angeles' Double-A affiliate, the Tulsa Drillers.
