= 2009 Seattle Mariners season =

2009 Seattle Mariners
- League: American League
- Division: West
- Ballpark: Safeco Field
- City: Seattle, Washington
- Record: 85–77 (.525)
- Divisional place: 3rd
- Owners: Nintendo of America (represented by Howard Lincoln)
- General managers: Jack Zduriencik
- Managers: Don Wakamatsu
- Television: Fox Sports Northwest (Dave Niehaus, Dave Sims, Rick Rizzs, Mike Blowers)
- Radio: Seattle Mariners Radio Network (English) (Dave Niehaus, Rick Rizzs) (Spanish) (Alex Rivera, Julio Cruz)

The 2009 Seattle Mariners season was the 33rd season in franchise history. They improved upon a disappointing 2008 season, where they finished last in the American League West with a 61–101 record. They finished 3rd in the AL West with an 85–77 record, a 24 win improvement. The 2009 Mariners became the 13th team in MLB history to have a winning record following a 100+ loss season. On September 13, 2009, Ichiro Suzuki got his 200th hit of the season. In the process, he set a new MLB record by getting at least 200 hits for nine consecutive seasons, passing the mark held by Wee Willie Keeler.

== Overview ==
Even before Opening Day, the season was marked with a flurry of change, most notably with the hiring of new general manager Jack Zduriencik, field manager Don Wakamatsu, and an entirely new major-league coaching staff. Unlike the previous season, which was approached with an expectation to contend for the AL West division title, the 2009 season has been approached with a rebuilding philosophy and a departure from the team-building strategies used in previous seasons. In January the Mariners unveiled their 2009 slogan, "A New Day, A New Way", to reflect their rebuilding philosophy.

In terms of players, this season was marked by the free agency departure of outfielder Raúl Ibáñez, who signed with the Philadelphia Phillies, and the trade of closer J. J. Putz to the New York Mets. However, the offseason has been most notable for the acquisition of longtime Mariners outfielder Ken Griffey Jr., nearly 10 years after trading him to the Cincinnati Reds. Other notable acquisitions have included outfielders Franklin Gutiérrez and Endy Chávez (both from the Putz trade), new closer David Aardsma (traded by Boston Red Sox) and long-time Kansas City Royals infielder Mike Sweeney (free agent).

This season also marks the 10th anniversary of Safeco Field, the Mariners' home stadium which opened its gates on July 15, 1999.

== Offseason ==
=== Front office changes ===
We believe Jack is the best person to provide a new approach and to lead our baseball operations. He has a proven track record of recognizing talent, both on the field and in the front office.

— Mariners president Chuck Armstrong on the hiring of Jack Zduriencik .

On June 16, 2008, then-general manager Bill Bavasi was dismissed after a disappointing 24–46 start, with vice president-assistant general manager Lee Pelekoudas selected as his interim replacement. During the off-season, the Mariners began their search for a new general manager with several candidates to be interviewed including Pelekoudas himself.

After an extensive search, the Mariners selected Milwaukee Brewers executive Jack Zduriencik, who was most notable for his drafting skills and credited with turning the Brewers into a playoff team, as their new general manager on October 22, 2008. Pelekoudas was retained as assistant general manager, but resigned on September 1, 2009.

=== Coaching changes ===
In addition to relieving general manager Bill Bavasi of his duties, the Mariners also fired manager John McLaren on June 19, 2008. Bench coach Jim Riggleman was selected as the interim manager for the rest of the 2008 season.

On November 19, 2008, the Mariners named Oakland Athletics bench coach Don Wakamatsu as their new manager. With the hiring, Wakamatsu becomes the first Asian-American manager in Major League Baseball. Wakamatsu then dismissed all of the coaching staff hired under the McLaren-Riggleman tenure, and hired Ty Van Burkleo as bench coach and Lee Tinsley as first base coach, while Rick Adair and John Wetteland were hired as the pitching and bullpen coaches respectively. Alan Cockrell was brought in as the new hitting coach.

=== Roster changes ===
==== Key departures ====
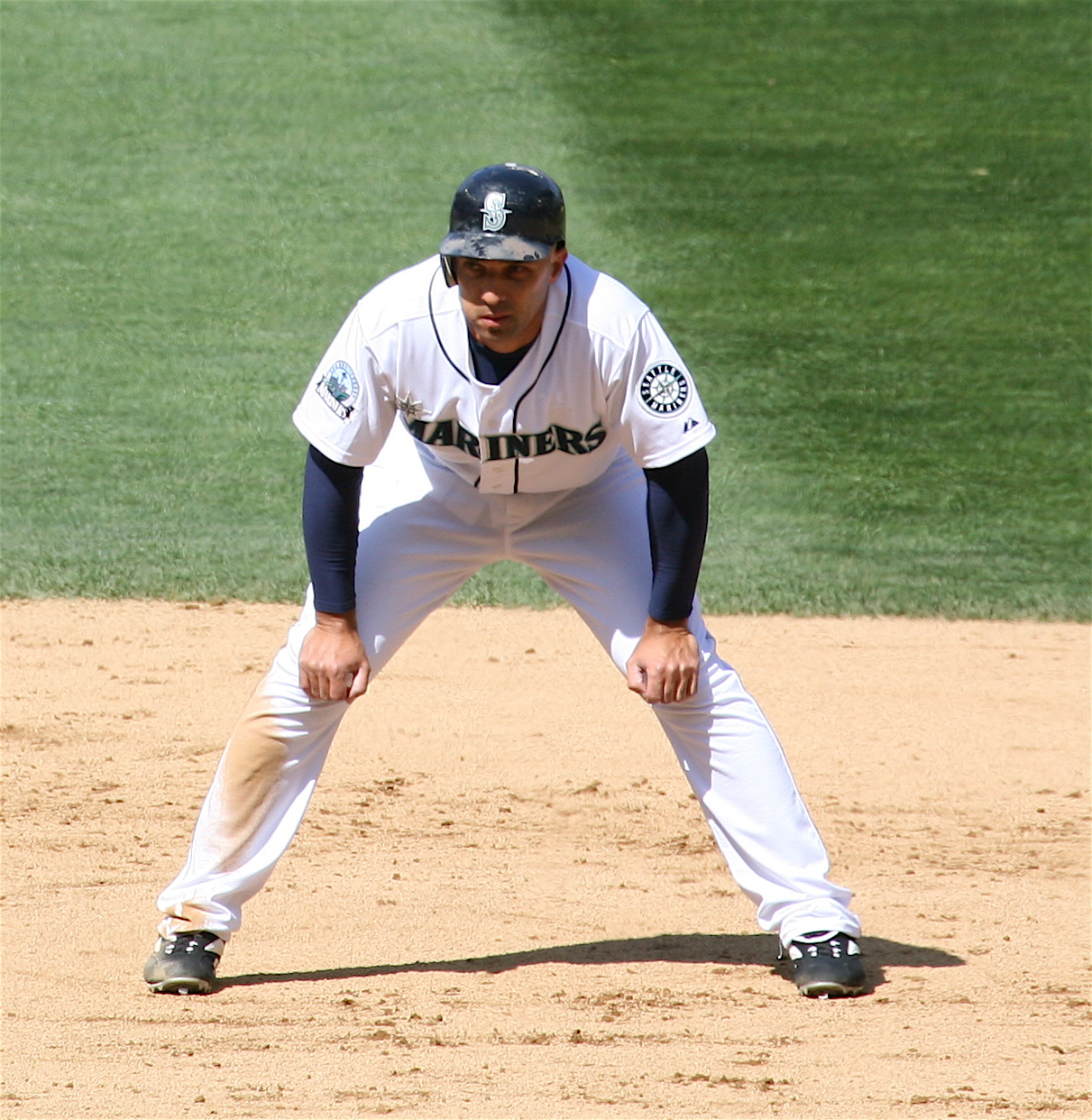
Raúl Ibáñez was one of the key players in the Mariners offense for the past five years.

Raúl Ibáñez, who led the team in RBIs in 2008, signed a 3-year, $31.5 million deal with the Philadelphia Phillies after a five-year tenure with the Mariners. Ibáñez, who was a Type A free agent, allowed the Mariners to receive the Phillies' first round pick in the 2009 MLB draft and also a compensatory pick as well.

On December 10, in a three-team trade, Zduriencik sent former All-Star closer J. J. Putz, outfielder Jeremy Reed and pitcher Sean Green to the New York Mets and prospect Luis Valbuena to the Cleveland Indians, in exchange for a combined seven players from both teams, most notably the Indians' Franklin Gutiérrez and the Mets' Endy Chávez.

On July 10, the Mariners sent shortstop Yuniesky Betancourt to the Kansas City Royals in exchange for two minor-league pitchers.

==== Key additions ====
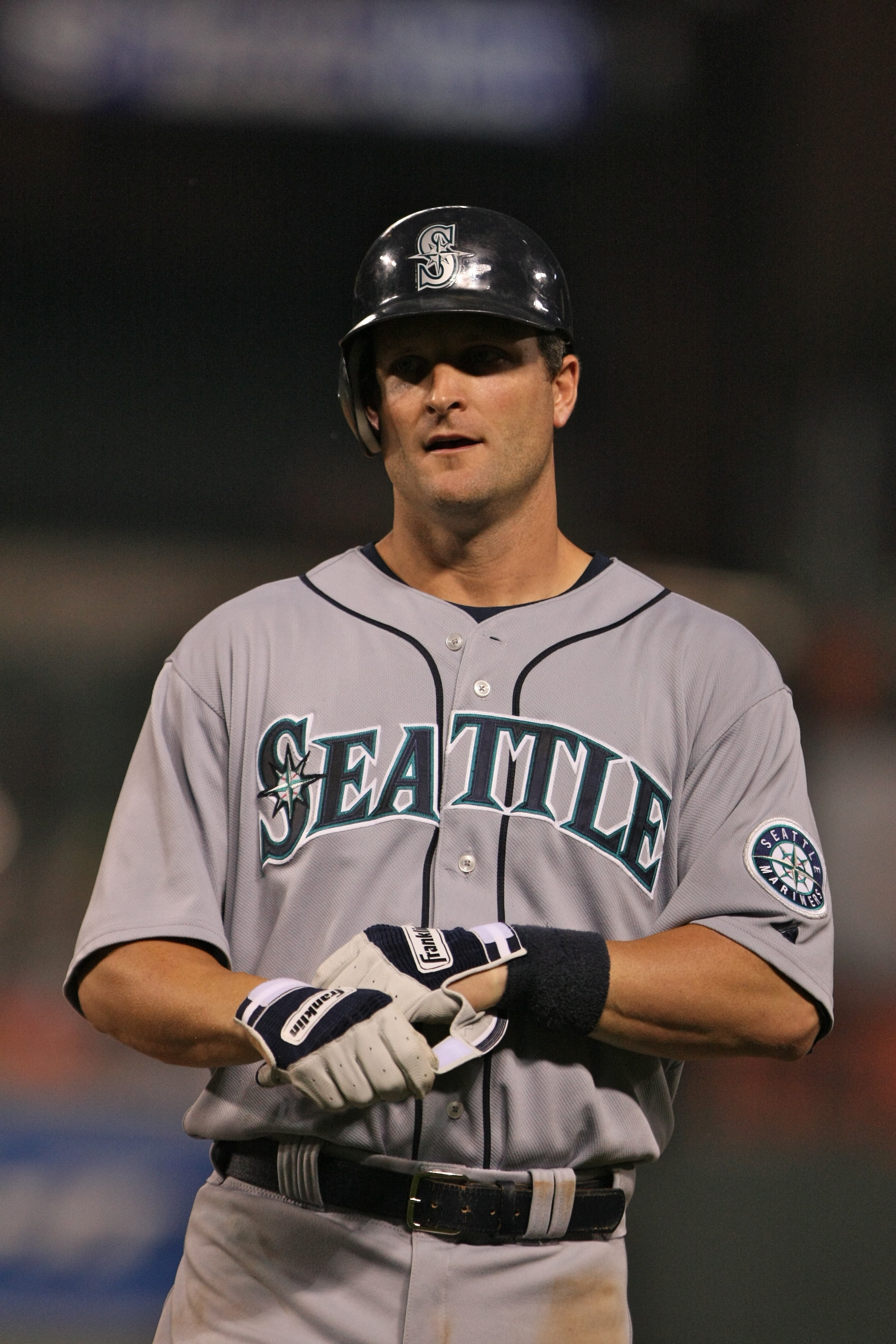
Russell Branyan was considered one of the best free agent pickups in the offseason.

The Mariners made numerous additions in free agency, adding over 17 players to the team. On December 3, the Mariners made their first move in the offseason by signing 1B Russell Branyan to a one-year deal. Branyan was one of the players that Zdurienck saw potential in during his time with the Brewers. Mike Sweeney, formerly a fan favorite and leader in the Royals organization, was signed as well to a minor-league deal.

Next, the Mariners received 7 players in the three team trade (see above) that netted them outfielders Endy Chávez and Franklin Gutierrez, pitcher Aaron Heilman, and four other minor leaguers including prospect Mike Carp and pitcher Jason Vargas. Heilman, however, would be traded to the Chicago Cubs almost a month later, in exchange for utility player Ronny Cedeño and pitcher Garrett Olson. Seattle also traded for pitcher David Aardsma from the Boston Red Sox in exchange for a minor leaguer.

===== Griffey's return =====
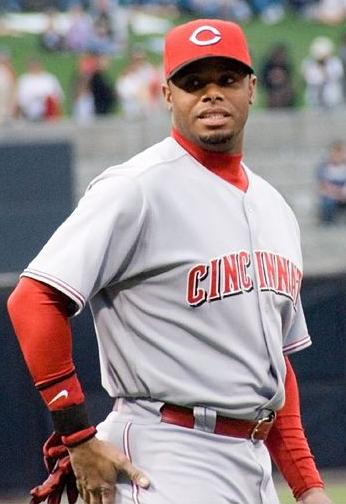
Ken Griffey Jr. returned to Seattle almost ten years after they traded him to the Cincinnati Reds.

Perhaps the biggest move in the offseason, however, was the signing of former Mariner Ken Griffey Jr. to a 1-year deal. Griffey, who was known as the man who "saved baseball in Seattle", received a warm welcome and a fifteen-minute presentation that applauds his tenure as a Mariner when his former team, the Cincinnati Reds, visited Safeco Field in 2007. Surprised by the reaction, Griffey explored the possibility of a return in Seattle. The Mariners reportedly were trying to negotiate with Griffey until the Atlanta Braves also wanted to sign him as well. Griffey was inclined to sign with Atlanta due to the proximity from his home, but choose to instead return to Seattle. Most, if not all, Mariners fans were ecstatic about the news, and orders of Griffey jerseys were off the charts.

== Complete transactions ==
=== 2008 ===
- October 22 Hired general manager Jack Zduriencik.
- November 19 Hired field manager Don Wakamatsu.
- December 1 Hired Ty Van Burkleo and Lee Tinsley as bench and first base coaches, respectively.
- December 3 Signed free agent IF Russell Branyan; hired Rick Adair and John Wetteland as pitching and bullpen coaches, respectively.
- December 7 Hired hitting coach Alan Cockrell.
- December 10 Negotiated 3-way trade with New York Mets and Cleveland Indians:
  - OF Jeremy Reed, RHP J. J. Putz, and RHP Sean Green to New York; IF Luis Valbuena to Cleveland
  - Cleveland OF Franklin Gutiérrez to Seattle; New York OF Endy Chávez, RHP Aaron Heilman and four minor leaguers to Seattle.
- December 23 Signed free agent C Jamie Burke to a minor league contract, two weeks after non-tendering him.

=== 2009 ===
- January 6 Signed free agent RHP Tyler Walker.
- January 19 Agreed to contract terms with RHP Félix Hernández, LHP Érik Bédard, and RHP Aaron Heilman, thereby avoiding salary arbitration.
- January 20 Traded minor-league (Class A) LHP Fabian Williamson to Boston Red Sox for RHP David Aardsma.
- January 28 Traded RHP Aaron Heilman to Chicago Cubs for LHP Garrett Olson and INF Ronny Cedeño; released RHP Randy Messenger.
- January 29 Signed free agent 1B/DH Mike Sweeney to a minor league deal.
- January 30 Re-signed RHP Randy Messenger to a minor league deal.
- February 5 Signed free agent LHP Tyler Johnson to a minor league deal.
- February 15 Claimed minor-league RHP Luis Peña off waivers from Milwaukee Brewers; designated INF Tug Hulett for assignment.
- February 18 Signed free agent OF Ken Griffey Jr.
- February 23 Re-signed OF Mike Wilson to a minor league deal, two days after releasing him.
- March 13 Signed free agent RHP Chad Cordero to a minor league deal.
- March 15 Claimed RHP Jesús Delgado off waivers from Florida Marlins, signed to minor-league deal.
- March 29 Acquired utility player Chris Burke from San Diego Padres for cash considerations; released RHP Tyler Walker.
- April 3 Placed OF Ichiro Suzuki on 15-day disabled list retroactive to March 31 due to bleeding ulcer.
- April 15 Placed LHP Ryan Rowland-Smith on 15-day disabled list retroactive to April 10 due to triceps tendinitis.
- April 16 Placed C Kenji Johjima on 15-day disabled list due to strained right hamstring; added C Jamie Burke and RHP Sean White to 40-man roster and activated both to take Rowland-Smith's and Johjima's places on active roster.
- April 21 Traded utility player Chris Burke back to San Diego Padres for cash considerations.
- May 2 Placed RHP Brandon Morrow on 15-day disabled list retroactive to April 24 due to biceps tendinitis; added LHP Jason Vargas to 40-man roster.
- May 6 Placed RHP Shawn Kelley on 15-day disabled list due to strained oblique muscle; recalled LHP Garrett Olson.
- May 9 Placed RHP Carlos Silva on 15-day disabled list retroactive to May 7 due to right shoulder inflammation; activated RHP Brandon Morrow from disabled list.
- May 26 Placed C Kenji Johjima to 15-day disabled list due to broken left big toe; added C Guillermo Quiróz to 40-man roster; transferred LHP Cesar Jimenez from 15-day disabled list to 60-day disabled list.
- June 7 Designated RHP Denny Stark for assignment; recalled C Jamie Burke.
- June 17 Placed LHP Érik Bédard to 15-day disabled list, retroactive June 8; recalled 1B Mike Carp to 40-man roster.
- June 20 Placed OF Endy Chávez to 60-day disabled list due to torn ligaments and cartilage in right knee; added SS Josh Wilson to 25-man roster.
- June 28 Acquired OF Ryan Langerhans from the Washington Nationals in exchange for utility player Mike Morse.
- June 30 Placed 3B Adrián Beltré to 15-day disabled list due to left shoulder surgery retroactive June 29; added OF Ryan Langerhans to 25-man roster; outrighted C Jamie Burke to Triple-A Tacoma.
- July 7 Places 1B Mike Sweeney on 15-day disabled list retroactive to July 6; activated LHP Érik Bédard from disabled list.
- July 10 Traded SS Yuniesky Betancourt to Kansas City Royals for minor-league RHP Danny Cortes and LHP Derrick Saito
- July 11 Acquired 3B Jack Hannahan from the Oakland Athletics in exchange for minor league RHP Justin Souza.
- July 11 Optioned RHP Brandon Morrow to AAA Tacoma.
- July 21 Designated IF Josh Wilson for assignment; activated 1B Mike Sweeney from the 15-day disabled list.
- July 24 Designated RHP Roy Corcoran for assignment; recalled RHP Ryan Rowland-Smith from Triple-A Tacoma.
- July 24 Outrighted IF Josh Wilson to Triple-A Tacoma.
- July 26 Designated OF Wladimir Balentien for assignment; purchased the contract of OF Michael Saunders from Triple-A Tacoma.
- July 27 Placed LHP Érik Bédard on the 15-day disabled list; recalled pitcher Jason Vargas from Triple-A Tacoma.
- July 29 Acquired SS Jack Wilson and RHP Ian Snell from the Pittsburgh Pirates in exchange for SS Ronny Cedeño, C/1B Jeff Clement, and RHP pitching prospects Aaron Pribanic, Brett Lorin and Nathan Adcock.
- July 29 Acquired RHP Robert Manuel from the Cincinnati Reds in exchange for OF Wladimir Balentien.
- July 31 Acquired LHP Lucas French and Mauricio Robles from the Detroit Tigers in exchange for LHP Jarrod Washburn.
- July 31 Recalled RHP Ian Snell from Triple-A Tacoma.
- August 1 Designated 1B Chris Shelton for assignment.
- August 4 Activated 3B Adrián Beltré from the 15-day disabled list; designated IF Chris Woodward for assignment.
- August 5 Outrighted 1B Chris Shelton to Triple-A Tacoma.
- August 7 Optioned LHP Jason Vargas to Triple-A Tacoma.
- August 7 Called up RHP Doug Fister Triple-A Tacoma.

== Regular season ==
=== Season standings ===
==== Division standings ====
AL West
Team	W	L	Pct.	GB	Home	Road
Los Angeles Angels	97	65	.599	—	49‍–‍32	48‍–‍33
Texas Rangers	87	75	.537	10	48‍–‍33	39‍–‍42
Seattle Mariners	85	77	.525	12	48‍–‍33	37‍–‍44
Oakland Athletics	75	87	.463	22	40‍–‍41	35‍–‍46

=== Record vs. opponents ===
2009 American League record Source: MLB Standings Grid – 2009
Team	BAL	BOS	CWS	CLE	DET	KC	LAA	MIN	NYY	OAK	SEA	TB	TEX	TOR	NL
Baltimore	–	2–16	5–4	2–5	3–5	4–4	2–8	3–2	5–13	1–5	4–5	8–10	5–5	9–9	11–7
Boston	16–2	–	4–4	7–2	6–1	5–3	4–5	4–2	9–9	5–5	2–4	9–9	2–7	11–7	11–7
Chicago	4–5	4−4	–	10–8	9–9	9–9	5–4	6−12	3–4	4–5	4–5	6–2	2–4	1–6	12–6
Cleveland	5–2	2–7	8–10	–	4–14	10–8	2–4	8–10	3–5	2–5	6–4	5–3	1–8	4–4	5–13
Detroit	5–3	1–6	9–9	14–4	–	9–9	5–4	7–12	1–5	5–4	5–4	5–2	7–2	3–5	10–8
Kansas City	4–4	3–5	9–9	8–10	9–9	–	1–9	6–12	2–4	2–6	5–4	1–9	3–3	4–3	8–10
Los Angeles	8–2	5–4	4–5	4–2	4–5	9–1	–	6–4	5–5	12–7	10–9	4–2	8–11	4–4	14–4
Minnesota	2–3	2–4	12–6	10–8	12–7	12–6	4–6	–	0–7	4–6	5–5	3–3	6–4	3–5	12–6
New York	13–5	9–9	4–3	5–3	5–1	4–2	5–5	7–0	–	7–2	6–4	11–7	5–4	12–6	10–8
Oakland	5–1	5–5	5–4	5–2	4–5	6–2	7–12	6–4	2–7	–	5–14	6–4	11–8	3–6	5–13
Seattle	5–4	4–2	5–4	4–6	4–5	4–5	9–10	5–5	4–6	14–5	–	5–3	8–11	3–4	11–7
Tampa Bay	10–8	9–9	2–6	3–5	2–5	9–1	2–4	3–3	7–11	4–6	3–5	–	3–6	14–4	13–5
Texas	5–5	7–2	4–2	8–1	2–7	3–3	11–8	4–6	4–5	8–11	11–8	6–3	–	5–5	9–9
Toronto	9–9	7–11	6–1	4–4	5–3	3–4	4–4	5–3	6–12	6–3	4–3	4–14	5–5	–	7–11

- Source: MLB Standings Grid – 2009

=== Game log ===
2009 Game Log (85-77)
April (13–9)

#	Date	Opponent	Score	Win	Loss	Save	Attendance	Record
1	April 6	@ Twins	6–1	Hernández (1–0)	Liriano (0–1)		48,514	1–0
2	April 7	@ Twins	6–5	Ayala (1–0)	Morrow (0–1)		23,755	1–1
3	April 8	@ Twins	6–5	Slowey (1–0)	Silva (0–1)	Nathan (1)	22,270	1–2
4	April 9	@ Twins	2–0	Washburn (1–0)	Perkins (0–1)	Morrow (1)	20,105	2–2
5	April 10	@ Athletics	5–4	Jakubauskas (1–0)	Anderson (0–1)	Aardsma (1)	36,067	3–2
6	April 11	@ Athletics	8–5	Batista (1–0)	Casilla (0–1)	Morrow (2)	19,560	4–2
7	April 12	@ Athletics	1–0	Bédard (1–0)	Cahill (0–1)	Aardsma (2)	12,127	5–2
8	April 14	Angels	3–2 (10)	Corcoran (1–0)	Shields (0–1)		45,958	6–2
9	April 15	Angels	11–3	Washburn (2–0)	Weaver (1–1)		18,516	7–2
10	April 16	Angels	5–1	Saunders (2–1)	Jakubauskas (1–1)		18,528	7–3
11	April 17	Tigers	6–3	Hernández (2–0)	Verlander (0–2)	Morrow (3)	35,824	8–3
12	April 18	Tigers	2–0	Jackson (1–0)	Bédard (1–1)	Rodney (3)	31,966	8–4
13	April 19	Tigers	8–2	Porcello (1–1)	Silva (0–2)		30,450	8–5
14	April 21	Rays	4–2	Washburn (3–0)	Sonnanstine (0–2)	Morrow (4)	19,582	9–5
15	April 22	Rays	9–3	Niemann (1–2)	Jakubauskas (1–2)		16,476	9–6
16	April 23	Rays	1–0	Hernández (3–0)	Shields (2–2)	Morrow (5)	17,639	10–6
17	April 24	@ Angels	8–3	Bédard (2–1)	Loux (0–2)		43,083	11–6
18	April 25	@ Angels	9–8	Silva (1–2)	Ortega (0–1)	Aardsma (3)	43,542	12–6
19	April 26	@ Angels	8–0	Weaver (2–1)	Washburn (3–1)		43,057	12–7
	April 27	@ White Sox	Postponed					
20	April 28	@ White Sox	2–1	Colón (2–1)	Jakubauskas (1–3)	Jenks (4)		12–8
21	April 28	@ White Sox	9–1	Hernández (4–0)	Danks (2–1)		25,042	13–8
22	April 29	@ White Sox	6–3	Thornton (1–1)	Kelley (0–1)	Jenks (5)	18,023	13–9

May (11–18)

#	Date	Opponent	Score	Win	Loss	Save	Attendance	Record
23	May 1	Athletics	8–7	Kelley (1–1)	Springer (0–1)		25,760	14–9
24	May 2	Athletics	3–2	Bailey (3–0)	Aardsma (0–1)	Wuertz (2)	29,484	14–10
25	May 3	Athletics	8–7 (15)	Vargas (1–0)	Eveland (1–2)		29,963	15–10
26	May 4	Rangers	6–5	Millwood (3–2)	Hernández (4–1)	Francisco (8)	16,421	15–11
27	May 5	Rangers	7–2 (10)	O'Day (1–0)	Stark (0–1)		19,810	15–12
28	May 6	@ Royals	9–1	Ponson (1–4)	Silva (1–3)		15,324	15–13
29	May 7	@ Royals	3–1	Bannister (3–0)	Washburn (3–2)	Soria (7)	32,714	15–14
30	May 8	@ Twins	11–0	Baker (1–4)	Jakubauskas (1–4)		29,714	15–15
31	May 9	@ Twins	9–6	Liriano (2–4)	Hernández (4–2)	Nathan (5)	29,552	15–16
32	May 10	@ Twins	5–3	Batista (2–0)	Crain (1–1)	Morrow (6)	25,555	16–16
33	May 12	@ Rangers	7–1	Holland (1–1)	Lowe (0–1)		16,564	16–17
34	May 13	@ Rangers	6–5 (11)	Wilson (2–2)	Morrow (0–2)		25,865	16–18
35	May 14	@ Rangers	3–2	Harrison (4–2)	Morrow (0–3)		21,002	16–19
36	May 15	Red Sox	5–4	Jakubauskas (2–4)	Lester (2–4)	Aardsma (4)	34,952	17–19
37	May 16	Red Sox	5–3	Beckett (4–2)	Olson (0–1)	Papelbon (10)	42,589	17–20
38	May 17	Red Sox	3–2	Aardsma (1–1)	Ramírez (4–1)		40,833	18–20
39	May 18	Angels	10–6	Lackey (1–0)	Washburn (3–3)		17,340	18–21
40	May 19	Angels	6–5	Palmer (5–0)	Hernández (4–3)	Fuentes (10)	16,002	18–22
41	May 20	Angels	1–0	Jakubauskas (3–4)	Santana (0–1)	Aardsma (5)	18,580	19–22
42	May 21	Angels	3–0	Saunders (6–2)	Bédard (2–2)	Fuentes (11)	18,468	19–23
43	May 22	Giants	2–1 (12)	White (1–0)	Miller (1–1)		38,520	20–23
44	May 23	Giants	5–1	Cain (5–1)	Lowe (0–2)		33,348	20–24
45	May 24	Giants	5–4	Hernández (5–3)	Zito (1–5)	Aardsma (6)	36,616	21–24
46	May 25	@ Athletics	6–1	Anderson (2–4)	Jakubauskas (3–5)	Cameron (1)	15,280	21–25
47	May 26	@ Athletics	4–3	Braden (4–5)	Batista (2–1)	Bailey (2)	10,371	21–26
48	May 27	@ Athletics	6–1	Bédard (3–2)	Cahill (2–5)		30,012	22–26
49	May 29	@ Angels	5–2	Vargas (2–0)	Lackey (1–1)	Aardsma (7)	38,492	23–26
50	May 30	@ Angels	4–3 (10)	Batista (3–1)	Arredondo (1–2)	Aardsma (8)	39,329	24–26
51	May 31	@ Angels	9–8	Speier (1–1)	Aardsma (1–2)		38,632	24–27

June (15–10)

#	Date	Opponent	Score	Win	Loss	Save	Attendance	Record
52	June 1	Orioles	1–0	Hill (2–0)	Washburn (3–4)	Sherrill (11)	16,979	24–28
53	June 2	Orioles	8–2	Bédard (4–2)	Hernández (1–1)		17,978	25–28
54	June 3	Orioles	3–2	Aardsma (2–2)	Johnson (2–3)		18,650	26–28
55	June 5	Twins	2–1 (10)	Guerrier (2–0)	Lowe (0–3)	Nathan (11)	35,808	26–29
56	June 6	Twins	2–1	Jakubauskas (4–5)	Henn (0–1)	Aardsma (9)	30,600	27–29
57	June 7	Twins	4–2	Bédard (5–2)	Slowey (8–2)	White (1)	37,714	28–29
58	June 9	@ Orioles	3–1	Bergesen (3–2)	Vargas (2–1)	Sherrill (12)	17,358	28–30
59	June 10	@ Orioles	4–1	Hernández (6–3)	Guthrie (4–6)	Aardsma (10)	12,770	29–30
60	June 11	@ Orioles	6–3	Olson (1–1)	Uehara (2–4)	Aardsma (11)	12,260	30–30
61	June 12	@ Rockies	6–4	Jiménez (5–6)	Washburn (3–5)		30,365	30–31
62	June 13	@ Rockies	5–3	Corpas (1–3)	Lowe (0–4)	Street (13)	31,101	30–32
63	June 14	@ Rockies	7–1	Hammel (4–3)	Vargas (2–2)		38,614	30–33
64	June 16	@ Padres	5–0	Hernández (7–3)	Correia (3–5)		17,040	31–33
65	June 17	@ Padres	4–3	Olson (2–1)	Gaudin (2–6)	Aardsma (12)	20,224	32–33
66	June 18	@ Padres	4–3	Bell (3–1)	Batista (3–2)		25,416	32–34
67	June 19	Diamondbacks	4–3	Batista (4–2)	Peña (5–3)	Aardsma (13)	27,319	33–34
68	June 20	Diamondbacks	7–3	Vargas (3–2)	Buckner (2–4)	Aardsma (14)	29,525	34–34
69	June 21	Diamondbacks	3–2	Lowe (1–4)	Zavada (1–1)		37,251	35–34
70	June 23	Padres	7–9	Gaudin (3–6)	Olson (2–2)	Bell (20)	23,537	35–35
71	June 24	Padres	4–3	White (2–0)	Mujica (2–3)	Aardsma (15)	22,988	36–35
72	June 25	Padres	9–3	Washburn (4–5)	Leblanc (0–1)		27,968	37–35
73	June 26	@ Dodgers	8–2	Kershaw (5–5)	Vargas (3–3)		50,752	37–36
74	June 27	@ Dodgers	5–1	Hernández (8–3)	Milton (2–1)		50,847	38–36
75	June 28	@ Dodgers	4–2	Olson (3–2)	Kuroda (2–4)	Aardsma (16)	49,355	39–36
76	June 30	@ Yankees	8–5	Bruney (3–0)	White (2–1)	Rivera (19)	46,181	39–37

July (14–13)

#	Date	Opponent	Score	Win	Loss	Save	Attendance	Record
77	July 1	@ Yankees	4–2	Pettitte (8–3)	Washburn (4–6)	Rivera (20)	45,285	39–38
78	July 2	@ Yankees	8–4	Batista (5–2)	Sabathia (7–5)		46,142	40–38
79	July 3	@ Red Sox	7–6 (11)	Jakubauskas (5–5)	Ramírez (5–3)	Lowe (1)	38,078	41–38
80	July 4	@ Red Sox	3–2	Corcoran (2–0)	Saito (2–2)	Aardsma (17)	37,656	42–38
81	July 5	@ Red Sox	8–4	Masterson (3–2)	Batista (5–3)		37,691	42–39
82	July 6	Orioles	5–0	Washburn (5–6)	Bergesen (5–3)		24,018	43–39
83	July 7	Orioles	12–4	Hendrickson (4–4)	Jakubauskas (5–6)		19,340	43–40
84	July 8	Orioles	5–3	Bass (5–2)	Aardsma (2–3)	Sherill (19)	27,040	43–41
85	July 9	Rangers	3–1	Hernández (9–3)	Wilson (4–4)	Aardsma (18)	24,823	44–41
86	July 10	Rangers	6–4	Feldman (8–2)	Morrow (0–4)	Francisco (15)	34,874	44–42
87	July 11	Rangers	4–1	Washburn (6–6)	Millwood (8–7)	Aardsma (19)	30,698	45–42
88	July 12	Rangers	5–3	Batista (6–3)	O'day (2–1)	Aardsma (20)	33,220	46–42
89	July 16	@ Indians	4–1	Lee (5–9)	Olson (3–3)		22,371	46–43
90	July 17	@ Indians	6–2	Hernández (10–3)	Huff (4–4)		23,545	47–43
91	July 18	@ Indians	3–1	Washburn (7–6)	Ohka (0–4)	Aardsma (21)	24,893	48–43
92	July 19	@ Indians	5–3	Kelly (2–1)	Betancourt (1–2)	Aardsma (22)	20,900	49–43
93	July 21	@ Tigers	9–7	Porcello (9–6)	Olson (3–4)	Rodney (20)	32,906	49–44
94	July 22	@ Tigers	2–1	Hernández (11–3)	Seay (1–2)	Aardsma (23)	29,758	50–44
95	July 23	@ Tigers	2–1	Washburn (8–6)	French (1–1)	Aardsma (24)	32,177	51–44
96	July 24	Indians	9–0	Laffey (4–2)	Rowland-Smith (0–1)		34,802	51–45
97	July 25	Indians	10–3	Sowers (3–7)	Bédard (5–3)		29,213	51–46
98	July 26	Indians	12–3	Lee (7–9)	Vargas (3–4)		30,224	51–47
99	July 27	Blue Jays	11–4	Romero (9–4)	Hernández (11–4)		28,696	51–48
100	July 28	Blue Jays	4–3	Aardsma (3–3)	Downs (1–3)		26,148	52–48
101	July 29	Blue Jays	3–2	Rowland-Smith (1–1)	Halladay (11–4)	Aardsma (25)	32,649	53–48
102	July 30	@ Rangers	7–1	Holland (4–6)	Olson (3–5)		23,949	53–49
103	July 31	@ Rangers	5–4	Padilla (8–5)	Vargas (3–5)	Wilson (12)	36,901	53–50

August (15–14)

#	Date	Opponent	Score	Win	Loss	Save	Attendance	Record
104	August 1	@ Rangers	7–2	Hernández (12–4)	Hunter (3–2)		29,458	54–50
105	August 2	@ Rangers	4–2	Feldman (10–4)	White (2–2)	Wilson (13)	28,670	54–51
106	August 4	@ Royals	7–6	Kelley (3–1)	Wright (1–4)	Aardsma (26)	15,057	55–51
107	August 5	@ Royals	11–6	French (2–2)	Davies (3–8)		27,805	56–51
108	August 6	@ Royals	8–2	Chen (1–6)	Vargas (3–6)		15,103	56–52
109	August 7	Rays	7–6 (11)	Kelley (4–1)	Howell (6–3)		44,378	57–52
110	August 8	Rays	10–4	Shields (7–8)	Jakubauskas (5–7)		28,239	57–53
111	August 9	Rays	11–2	Rowland-Smith (2–1)	Kazmir (6–7)		28,490	58–53
112	August 10	White Sox	6–4	White (3–2)	Floyd (9–7)	Aardsma (27)	21,049	59–53
113	August 11	White Sox	3–1	Danks (10–8)	Aardsma (3–4)	Jenks (23)	19,385	59–54
114	August 12	White Sox	1–0 (14)	Jakubauskas (6–7)	Peña (1–1)		24,427	60–54
115	August 13	Yankees	11–1	Sabathia (13–7)	Snell (3–8)		33,585	60–55
116	August 14	Yankees	4–2	Hughes (5–3)	Lowe (1–5)	Rivera (34)	36,769	60–56
117	August 15	Yankees	5–2	Mitre (2–1)	French (2–3)	Rivera (35)	44,272	60–57
118	August 16	Yankees	10–3	Fister (1–0)	Chamberlain (8–3)		45,210	61–57
119	August 18	@ Tigers	5–3	Seay (3–2)	Lowe (1–6)	Rodney (25)	33,710	61–58
120	August 19	@ Tigers	3–1	Snell (3–9)	Verlander (13–7)	Aardsma (28)	33,194	62–58
121	August 20	@ Tigers	7–6	Seay (4–2)	Aardsma (3–5)		31,167	62–59
122	August 21	@ Indians	9–4	French (3–3)	Huff (7–7)		28,503	63–59
123	August 22	@ Indians	4–3	Pérez (2–2)	Messenger (0–1)		28,942	63–60
124	August 23	@ Indians	6–1	Carmona (3–7)	Hernández (12–5)		23,086	63–61
125	August 24	Athletics	3–1	Snell (4–9)	Mazzaro (4–9)	Aardsma (29)	21,056	64–61
126	August 25	Athletics	4–2	Lowe (2–6)	Breslow (5–7)		17,661	65–61
127	August 26	Athletics	5–3	French (4–3)	G. Gonzalez (4–5)	Aardsma (30)	18,695	66–61
128	August 27	Royals	8–4	Davies (5–9)	Fister (1–1)		19,345	66–62
129	August 28	Royals	6–3	Hernández (13–5)	Bannister (7–11)	Aardsma (31)	26,714	67–62
130	August 29	Royals	8–4	Snell (5–9)	Meche (6–10)		26,457	68–62
131	August 30	Royals	3–0	Greinke (13–8)	Rowland-Smith (2–2)		30,286	68–63
132	August 31	Angels	10–0	Saunders (11–7)	French (4–4)		18,959	68–64

September (14–12)

#	Date	Opponent	Score	Win	Loss	Save	Attendance	Record
133	September 1	Angels	2–1	Fister (2–1)	Oliver (4–1)	Aardsma (31)	18,542	69–64
134	September 2	Angels	3–0	Hernández (14–5)	Kazmir (8–8)	Aardsma (32)	22,130	70–64
135	September 3	@ Athletics	7–4	Snell (6–9)	Tomko (3–3)	Aardsma (34)	10,297	71–64
136	September 4	@ Athletics	6–3	Rowland-Smith (3–2)	Mortensen (0–2)	Lowe (2)	11,738	72–64
137	September 5	@ Athletics	9–5	Anderson (8–10)	French (4–5)	Bailey (22)	16,495	72–65
138	September 6	@ Athletics	5–2	G. Gonzalez (5–5)	Kelley (4–2)	Bailey (23)	16,188	72–66
139	September 8	@ Angels	3–2 (10)	Palmer (10–1)	Batista (6–4)		37,725	72–67
140	September 9	@ Angels	6–3	Weaver (15–5)	Snell (6–10)	Fuentes (40)	36,340	72–68
141	September 10	@ Angels	3–0	Lackey (10–7)	Rowland-Smith (3–3)		37,412	72–69
	September 11	@ Rangers	Postponed (rain); rescheduled for September 13					
142	September 12	@ Rangers	8–3	Morrow (1–4)	Millwood (10–10)		22,468	73–69
143	September 13	@ Rangers	7–2	Hunter (8–3)	Fister (2–2)			73–70
144	September 13	@ Rangers	5–0	Hernández (15–5)	Holland (7–11)		18,522	74–70
145	September 15	White Sox	6–3	García (2–2)	Kelley (4–3)	Jenks (29)	17,153	74–71
146	September 16	White Sox	4–1	Rowland-Smith (4–3)	Floyd (11–11)	Aardsma (35)	16,596	75–71
147	September 17	White Sox	4–3 (14)	Kelley (5–3)	Linebrink (3–7)		16,336	76–71
148	September 18	Yankees	3–2	Hernández (16–5)	Rivera (3–3)		28,395	77–71
149	September 19	Yankees	10–1	Sabathia (18–7)	Fister (2–3)		43,173	77–72
150	September 20	Yankees	7–1	Snell (7–10)	Chamberlain (8–6)		35,885	78–72
151	September 22	@ Rays	4–3	Batista (7–4)	Wheeler (4–5)	Lowe (3)	12,514	79–72
152	September 23	@ Rays	5–4	Springer (1–4)	Lowe (2–7)	Choate (5)	13,009	79–73
153	September 24	@ Blue Jays	5–4	Hernández (17–5)	Carlson (1–6)	Aardsma (36)	15,306	80–73
154	September 25	@ Blue Jays	5–0	Halladay (16–10)	Fister (2–4)		20,668	80–74
155	September 26	@ Blue Jays	5–4 (10)	Frasor (7–3)	Kelley (5–4)		29,783	80–75
156	September 27	@ Blue Jays	5–4	Wolfe (2–2)	Rowland-Smith (4–4)	Camp (1)	39,052	80–76
157	September 29	Athletics	6–4	Hernández (18–5)	Cahill (10–13)		18,167	81–76
158	September 30	Athletics	7–0	Morrow (2–4)	Mortensen (2–4)		16,930	82–76

October (3–1)

#	Date	Opponent	Score	Win	Loss	Save	Attendance	Record
159	October 1	Athletics	4–2	Fister (3–4)	Anderson (11–11)	Aardsma (37)	16,607	83–76
160	October 2	Rangers	7–4	Wilson (5–6)	Aardsma (3–6)	Francisco (26)	27,899	83–77
161	October 3	Rangers	2–1	Rowland-Smith (5–4)	Hunter (9–6)	Batista (1)	24,391	84–77
162	October 4	Rangers	4–3	Hernández (19–5)	Feldman (17–8)	Aardsma (38)	32,260	85–77

=== Roster ===
2009 Seattle Mariners
Roster
Pitchers: 53 David Aardsma; 43 Miguel Batista; 45 Érik Bédard; 48 Roy Corcoran; 58 Doug Fister; 25 Lucas French; 34 Félix Hernández; 41 Chris Jakubauskas; 23 Shawn Kelley; 57 Mark Lowe; 26 Randy Messenger; 35 Brandon Morrow; 49 Garrett Olson; 18 Ryan Rowland-Smith; 52 Carlos Silva; 48 Ian Snell; 21 Dennis Stark; 38 Jason Vargas; 56 Jarrod Washburn; 46 Sean White	Catchers: 15 Jamie Burke; 2 Kenji Johjima; 32 Rob Johnson; 50 Adam Moore; 55 Guillermo Quiróz; Infielders: 29 Adrián Beltré; 7 Yuniesky Betancourt; 30 Russell Branyan; 59 Mike Carp; 3 Ronny Cedeño; 7 Jack Hannahan; 4 José López; 13 Chris Shelton; 5 Mike Sweeney; 27 Matt Tuiasosopo; 9 Jack Wilson; 16 Josh Wilson; 6 Chris Woodward; Outfielders: 25 Wladimir Balentien; 10 Endy Chávez; 24 Ken Griffey Jr.; 21 Franklin Gutiérrez; 3 Bill Hall; 12 Ryan Langerhans; 55 Michael Saunders; 51 Ichiro Suzuki	Manager: 22 Don Wakamatsu; Coaches: 40 Rick Adair (pitching); 47 Alan Cockrell (hitting); 17 Bruce Hines (third base); 8 Lee Tinsley (first base); 44 Ty Van Burkleo (bench); 28 John Wetteland (bullpen)

== Player stats ==
=== Batting ===
Note: G = Games played; AB = At bats; R = Runs scored; H = Hits; 2B = Doubles; 3B = Triples; HR = Home runs; RBI = Runs batted in; AVG = Batting average; SB = Stolen bases

Through October 4, 2009

Player	G	AB	R	H	2B	3B	HR	RBI	AVG	SB
Wladimir Balentien	56	155	18	33	10	0	4	13	.213	1
Adrián Beltré	111	449	54	119	27	0	8	44	.265	13
Yuniesky Betancourt	63	224	15	56	10	1	2	22	.250	3
Russell Branyan	116	431	64	108	21	1	31	76	.251	2
Jamie Burke	13	41	1	5	0	0	1	1	.122	0
Mike Carp	21	54	7	17	3	1	1	5	.315	0
Ronny Cedeño	59	186	15	31	4	2	5	17	.167	3
Endy Chávez	54	161	17	44	3	1	2	13	.273	9
Ken Griffey Jr.	117	387	44	83	19	0	19	57	.214	0
Franklin Gutiérrez	153	565	85	160	24	1	18	70	.283	16
Bill Hall	34	120	10	24	8	1	2	12	.200	1
Jack Hannahan	51	148	15	34	8	0	3	11	.230	1
Kenji Johjima	71	239	24	59	11	0	9	22	.247	2
Rob Johnson	80	258	21	55	19	2	2	27	.213	1
Ryan Langerhans	38	101	12	22	6	1	3	10	.218	0
José López	153	613	69	167	42	0	25	96	.272	3
Adam Moore	6	23	4	5	1	0	1	2	.217	1
Guillermo Quiroz	4	14	0	4	0	0	0	2	.286	0
Michael Saunders	46	122	13	27	1	3	0	4	.221	4
Chris Shelton	9	26	1	6	2	0	0	4	.231	0
Ichiro Suzuki	146	639	88	225	31	4	11	46	.352	26
Mike Sweeney	74	242	25	68	15	0	8	34	.281	0
Matt Tuiasosopo	7	22	2	5	1	0	1	2	.227	0
Jack Wilson	31	107	11	24	5	0	1	8	.224	1
Josh Wilson	45	128	16	32	8	1	3	10	.250	1
Chris Woodward	20	67	7	16	1	0	0	5	.239	1
Pitcher totals	162	21	2	1	0	0	0	0	.048	0
Team totals	162	5543	640	1430	280	19	160	613	.258	89

=== Pitching ===
==== Starting and other pitchers ====
Note: G = Games pitched; GS = Games started (for pitchers who did not start every appearance); IP = Innings pitched; W = Wins; L = Losses; ERA = Earned run average; SO = Strikeouts

Through October 4, 2009

Player	G	IP	W	L	CG	ERA	SO
Érik Bédard	15	83.0	5	3	0	2.82	90
Doug Fister	11 (10 GS)	61.0	3	4	0	4.13	36
Luke French	8 (7 GS)	38.0	3	3	0	6.63	23
Félix Hernández	34	238.2	19	5	2	2.49	217
Chris Jakubauskas	35 (8 GS)	93.0	6	7	1	5.32	47
Garrett Olson	31 (11 GS)	80.1	3	5	0	5.60	47
Ryan Rowland-Smith	15	96.1	5	4	0	3.74	52
Carlos Silva	8 (6 GS)	28.2	1	3	0	8.60	10
Ian Snell	12	64.1	5	2	0	4.20	37
Jason Vargas	23 (14 GS)	91.2	3	6	0	4.91	54
Jarrod Washburn	20	133.0	8	6	1	2.64	79

==== Relief pitchers ====
Note: G = Games pitched; IP = Innings pitched; W = Wins; L = Losses; SV = Saves; SVO = Save opportunities; ERA = Earned run average; SO = Strikeouts

Through October 4, 2009

Player	G	IP	W	L	SV	SVO	ERA	SO
David Aardsma	73	44.1	3	6	38	40	2.52	80
Miguel Batista	56	71.1	7	4	1	4	4.04	52
Roy Corcoran	16	19.0	2	0	0	1	6.16	6
Shawn Kelley	41	46.0	5	4	0	2	4.50	41
Mark Lowe	75	80.0	2	7	3	6	3.26	69
Randy Messenger	12	10.1	0	1	0	0	4.35	5
Brandon Morrow	26 (10 GS)	69.2	2	4	6	8	4.39	63
Denny Stark	9	11.0	0	1	0	0	6.55	7
Sean White	52	64.1	3	2	1	2	2.80	28

==== Team totals ====
Note: G = Games pitched; IP = Innings pitched; W = Wins; L = Losses; SV = Saves; SVO = Save opportunities; CG = Complete games; SHO = Shutouts; ERA = Earned run average; SO = Strikeouts

Through October 4, 2009

G	IP	W	L	SV	SVO	CG	SHO	ERA	SO
162	1452.2	85	77	49	77	4	2	3.87	1043

== Farm system ==
Level	Team	League	Manager
AAA	Tacoma Rainiers	Pacific Coast League	Daren Brown
AA	West Tenn Diamond Jaxx	Southern League	Phil Plantier
A	High Desert Mavericks	California League	Jim Horner
A	Clinton LumberKings	Midwest League	Scott Steinmann
A-Short Season	Everett AquaSox	Northwest League	John Tamargo
Rookie	Pulaski Mariners	Appalachian League	José Moreno
Rookie	AZL Mariners	Arizona League	Andy Bottin

LEAGUE CHAMPIONS: AZL Mariners

== Major League Baseball draft ==
2009 Seattle Mariners draft picks
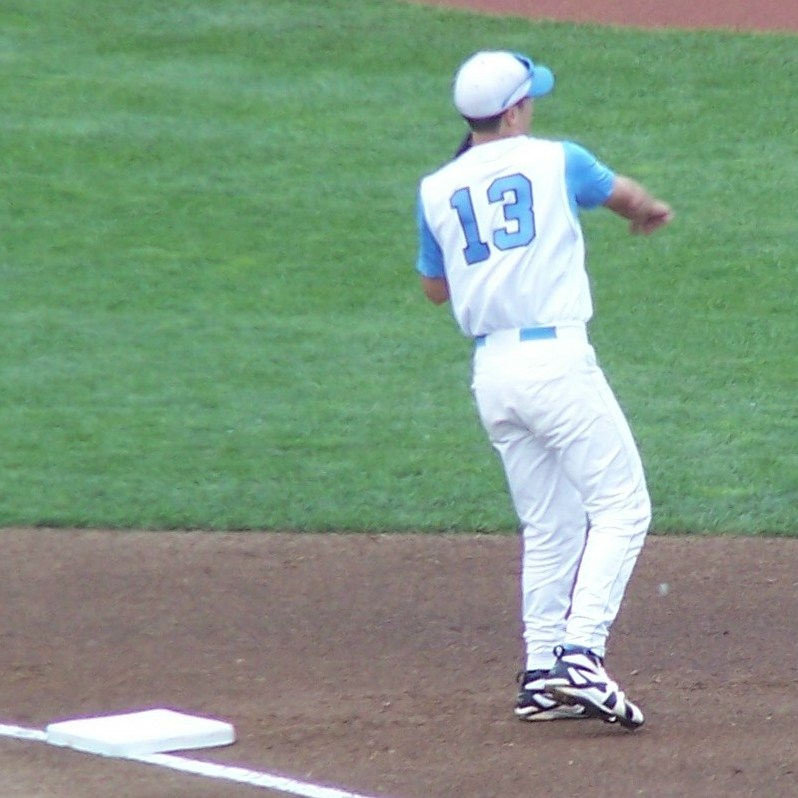
- Dustin Ackley (pictured right) was the Mariners first round pick in 2009.

Information
- Owner: Nintendo of America
- General manager(s): Jack Zduriencik
- Manager(s): Don Wakamatsu
- First pick: Dustin Ackley (Rule 4); Kanekoa Texeira (Rule 5)
- Draft positions: 2 (Rule 4); 14 (Rule 5)
- Number of selections: 52 (Rule 4); 2 (Rule 5)
- Players signed (Rule 4): 35

Links
- Results: Baseball-Reference
- Official site: The Official Site of the Seattle Mariners
- Years: 2008 • 2009 • 2010

Below is a complete list of the Seattle Mariners draft picks from the two 2009 Major League Baseball drafts.

The Seattle Mariners took part in both the Major League Baseball Rule 4 draft and the Rule 5 draft in 2009.

The 2009 Major League Baseball draft was held June 9 to June 11 at the MLB Network Studios in New York City. The Seattle Mariners went second in the draft order and had two supplemental first-round draft picks for the loss of free agent Raúl Ibáñez after the 2008 season. The Mariners selected a total of 52 players and signed 35 of those selected players.

The Mariners selected one player in the Major League Baseball phase of the 2009 Rule 5 draft. They also had one player selected (Marshall Hubbard) in the 2009 Triple-A phase of the Rule 5 draft. The Mariners also selected one player in the Triple-A phase of the draft as well.

=== Key ===
Round (Pick)	Indicates the round and pick the player was drafted
Position	Indicates the secondary/collegiate position at which the player was drafted, rather than the professional position the player may have gone on to play
**Bold**	Indicates the player signed with the Mariners before the deadline
Italics	Indicates the player did not sign with the Mariners before the deadline

=== Table ===
Round (Pick)	Name	Position	School	Ref
1 (2)	**Dustin Ackley**	Center fielder	University of North Carolina	
1 (27)	**Nick Franklin**	Shortstop	Lake Brantley High School	
1 (33)	**Steven Baron**	Catcher	John A. Ferguson High School	
2 (51)	**Rich Poythress**	First baseman	University of Georgia	
3 (82)	**Kyle Seager**	Second baseman	University of North Carolina	
4 (113)	**James Jones**	Left fielder	Long Island University	
5 (143)	**Tyler Blandford**	Right-handed pitcher	Oklahoma State University	
6 (173)	**Shaver Hansen**	Third baseman	Baylor University	
7 (203)	**Brian Moran**	Left-handed pitcher	University of North Carolina	
8 (233)	**James Gillheeney**	Left-handed pitcher	North Carolina State University	
9 (263)	**Trevor Coleman**	Catcher	University of Missouri	
10 (293)	**Vincent Catricala**	Third basemen	University of Hawaii	
11 (323)	**Timothy Morris**	First baseman	St. John's University	
12 (353)	**Andrew Carraway**	Right-handed pitcher	University of Virginia	
13 (383)	**Matthew Cerione**	Center fielder	University of Georgia	
14 (413)	Adam Nelubowich	Third baseman	Vauxhall High School	
15 (443)	Blake Keitzman	Left-handed pitcher	Western Oregon University	
16 (473)	Tillman Pugh	Center fielder	Gateway Community College	
17 (503)	Joseph Terry	Second baseman	Cerritos College	
18 (533)	**Anthony Vasquez**	Left-handed pitcher	University of Southern California	
19 (563)	**Eric Thomas**	Right-handed pitcher	Bethune-Cookman College	
20 (593)	**John Hesketh**	Left-handed pitcher	University of New Mexico	
21 (623)	**Daniel Cooper**	Right-handed pitcher	University of Southern California	
22 (653)	Andrew Hayes	Right-handed pitcher	Vanderbilt University	
23 (683)	David Rollins	Left-handed pitcher	San Jacinto Junior College	
24 (713)	**Carlton Tanabe**	Catcher	Pearl City High School	
25 (743)	**Brandon Josselyn**	Right-handed pitcher	Yale University	
26 (773)	**Chris Sorce**	Right-handed pitcher	Troy University	
27 (803)	**Austin Hudson**	Right-handed pitcher	University of Central Florida	
28 (833)	Regan Flaherty	First baseman	Deering High School	
29 (863)	**Brandon Haveman**	Center fielder	Purdue University	
30 (893)	**Brandon Bantz**	Catcher	Dallas Baptist University	
31 (923)	Clint Dempster	Left-handed pitcher	Mississippi Gulf Coast Junior College	
32 (953)	Bennett Whitmore	Left-handed pitcher	University of Oregon	
33 (983)	**Hawkins Gebbers**	Second baseman	Biola University	
34 (1013)	Scott Griggs	Right-handed pitcher	San Ramon Valley High School	
35 (1043)	**Eric Valdez**	Right-handed pitcher	Indiana State University	
36 (1073)	**John Housey**	Right-handed pitcher	University of Miami	
37 (1133)	**Chris Kessinger**	Right-handed pitcher	University of Nebraska, Omaha	
38 (1133)	Matthew Nohelty	Center fielder	University of Minnesota	
39 (1163)	**Greg Waddell**	Left fielder	Florida International University	
40 (1193)	**Jorden Merry**	Right-handed pitcher	University of Washington	
41 (1223)	**Kyle Witten**	Right-handed pitcher	California State University, Fullerton	
42 (1253)	Stephen Hagen	Third baseman	Eastern Oklahoma State Community College	
43 (1283)	Cameron Perkins	Left fielder	Southport High School	
44 (1313)	**Mark Angelo**	Left fielder	East Stroudsburg University	
45 (1343)	**Kevin Mailloux**	Second baseman	Canisius College	
46 (1373)	Clay Cederquist	First baseman	Fowler High School	
47 (1403)	David Holman	Right-handed pitcher	Hutchinson Community College	
48 (1433)	Sean Nolin	Left-handed pitcher	Hutchinson Community College	
49 (1463)	Dane Phillips	Catcher	Central Heights High School	
50 (1493)	**Evan Sharpley**	Third baseman	University of Notre Dame	

== Rule 5 draft ==
=== Key ===
Pick	Indicates the pick the player was drafted
Previous team	Indicates the previous organization, not Minor league team

=== Table ===
Phase	Pick	Name	Position	Previous team	Notes	Ref
Major League	14	Kanekoa Texeira	Right-handed pitcher	New York Yankees	none	
Triple-A	9	Terrence Engles	Right-handed pitcher	Washington Nationals	none	
