= David Aardsma =

American baseball player (born 1981)

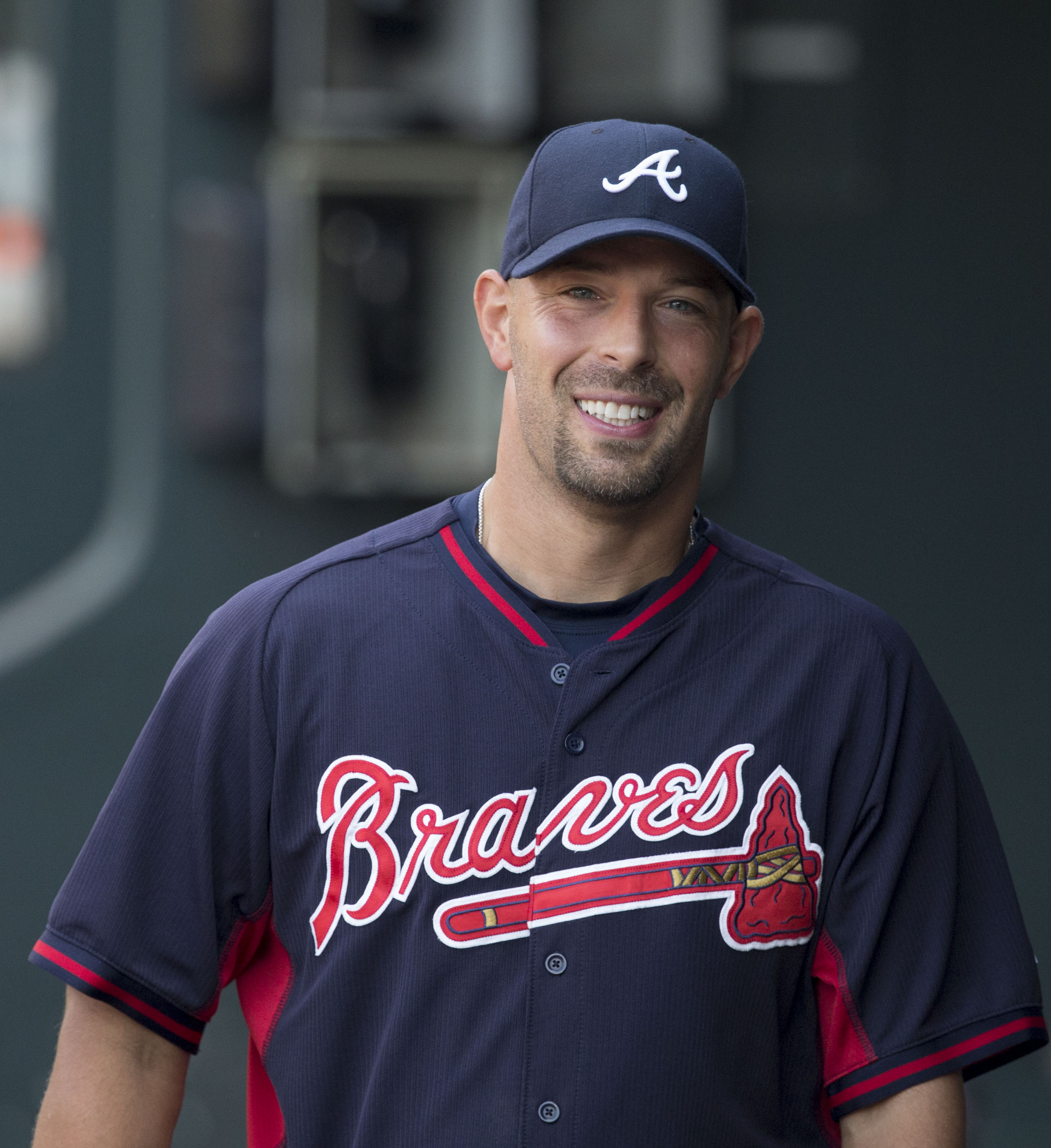
- Aardsma with the Atlanta Braves in 2015
- Pitcher
- Born: December 27, 1981 (age 44); Denver, Colorado, U.S.
- Batted: Right Threw: Right

MLB debut
- April 6, 2004, for the San Francisco Giants

Last MLB appearance
- August 23, 2015, for the Atlanta Braves

MLB statistics
- Win–loss record: 16–18
- Earned run average: 4.27
- Strikeouts: 340
- Saves: 69
- Stats at Baseball Reference

Teams
- San Francisco Giants (2004); Chicago Cubs (2006); Chicago White Sox (2007); Boston Red Sox (2008); Seattle Mariners (2009–2010); New York Yankees (2012); New York Mets (2013); Atlanta Braves (2015)

David Allan Aardsma (/ˈɑːrdzmə/; born December 27, 1981) is an American former professional baseball pitcher, currently serving in the Toronto Blue Jays front office as a coordinator of player development. He played in Major League Baseball (MLB) from 2004 to 2015 for the San Francisco Giants, Chicago Cubs, Chicago White Sox, Boston Red Sox, Seattle Mariners, New York Yankees, New York Mets, and Atlanta Braves. Aardsma is notable as the first player in alphabetical order among all of those who have ever played in MLB.

== Amateur career ==
Aardsma was born in Denver, Colorado, and attended Cherry Creek High School in Colorado, graduating in 2000. He subsequently attended Pennsylvania State University in his first year of college. He transferred to Rice University in 2001, where he remained for the rest of his college tenure. Playing for the Rice Owls baseball team, Aardsma set school single-season and career records in saves in 2003. In the 2003 College World Series, he earned two wins and a save as the Owls won their first national championship.

In 2002, while playing collegiate summer baseball for the Falmouth Commodores in the Cape Cod Baseball League (CCBL), Aardsma was named a league all-star, posting a 0.68 ERA with 45 strikeouts over 26 2/3 innings. In 2010, he was inducted into the CCBL Hall of Fame.

== Professional career ==
=== San Francisco Giants ===
The right-hander was drafted in the 1st round (22nd overall) of the 2003 Major League Baseball draft by the San Francisco Giants. He went to the San Jose Giants of the High-A California League, where he posted a 1.96 ERA while striking out 28 in 18.1 innings. He made the major-league roster in 2004, skipping Double-A and Triple-A, and made his debut on April 6, the second game of the season. In his major league debut, in front of friends and family at Minute Maid Park, he pitched two innings, allowing three hits and walking one, to earn his first MLB win. He maintained a 1.80 ERA over his first six appearances. However, after giving up two runs in one inning on April 20, he was sent down to Triple-A Fresno. He pitched in just four more games at the Major League level that year, allowing five runs on 10 hits in 4.2 innings.

Aardsma's route through professional baseball was somewhat unusual, given that after making the leap from Single-A to the Giants, he was demoted to Triple-A and then subsequently started the 2005 season in Double-A with the Norwich Navigators.

=== Chicago Cubs ===
On May 28, 2005, Aardsma, along with pitcher Jerome Williams, was traded to the Chicago Cubs for veteran pitcher LaTroy Hawkins. He spent the 2005 season in the minor leagues before returning to the big leagues with the Cubs in 2006. That year, he posted a 3–0 record and 4.08 ERA in 45 relief appearances, finishing nine games. Aardsma was especially effective against left-handed hitters, holding them to a .191 (12-for-63) batting average against.

=== Chicago White Sox ===
After a solid 2006 season with the Cubs, Aardsma, along with minor leaguer Carlos Vásquez, was sent across town to the Chicago White Sox in exchange for reliever Neal Cotts. Aardsma started the 2007 season strong. In April, he posted a 1.72 ERA while recording 23 strikeouts in only 15 2/3 innings pitched; he struck out at least one batter in each of his first 13 appearances of the season. On April 4, Aardsma matched a career high with five strikeouts against the Cleveland Indians. On April 11, as the White Sox visited the Oakland Athletics, he recorded his first American League win. In May, however, he allowed 11 runs on 16 hits and nine walks.

On June 2, Aardsma allowed five runs in one inning, including a three-run home run to Blue Jays outfielder Alex Rios. He was then optioned to Triple-A Charlotte. He was recalled on June 19, but only made three more appearances that season. Overall, he ended with a 6.40 ERA in 25 games.

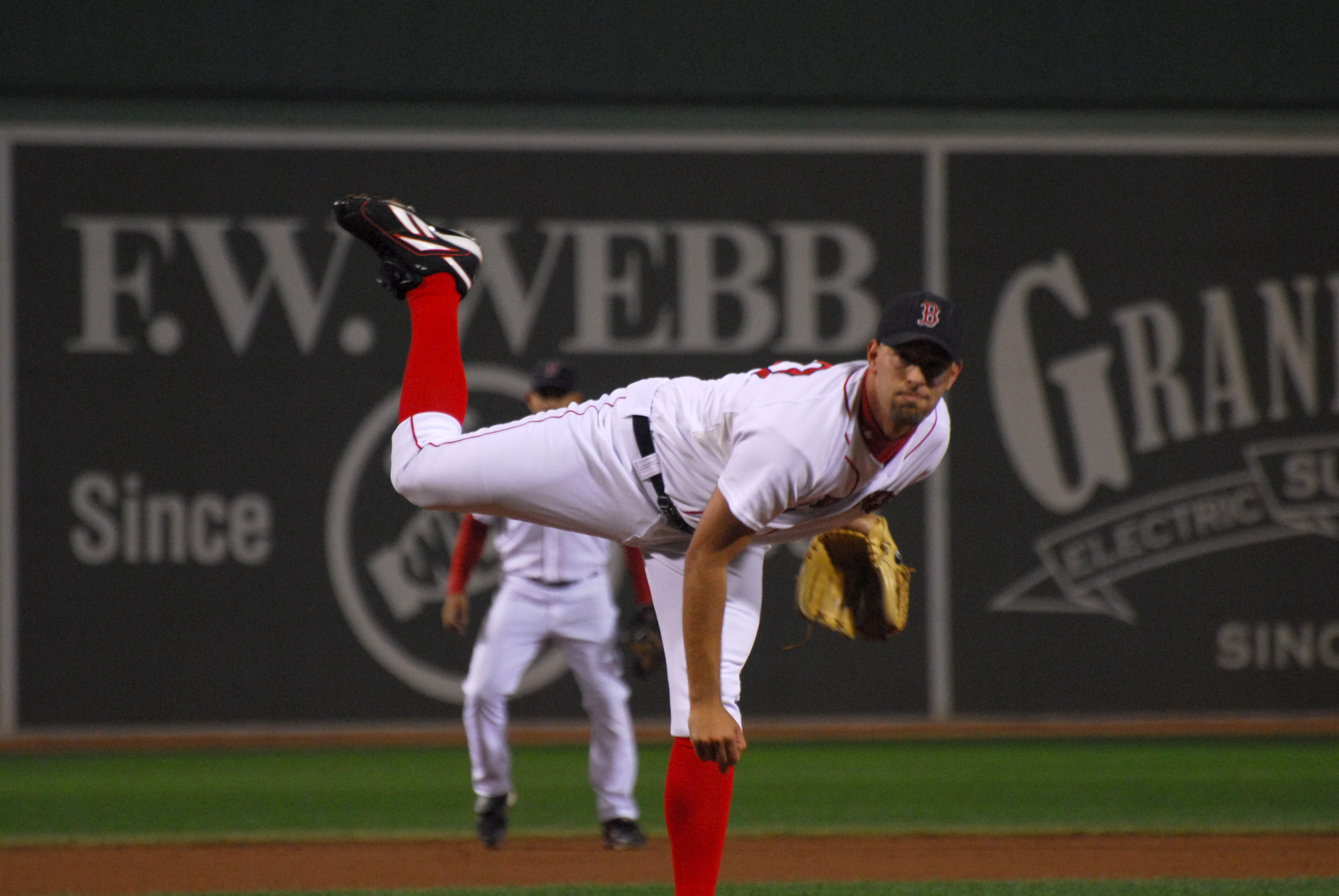
Aardsma pitching for the Boston Red Sox in 2008

=== Boston Red Sox ===
On January 28, 2008, the Boston Red Sox acquired Aardsma from the White Sox for pitching prospects Willy Mota and Miguel Socolovich.

He pitched well for the Red Sox, maintaining a 2.75 ERA with 41 strikeouts through July 18. Aardsma then suffered a groin strain that sent him to the disabled list on two different occasions. He also saw his velocity drastically diminish after returning. He allowed 18 runs on 20 hits in 9.1 innings to finish out the season. Overall, he held a 4–2 record with a 5.55 ERA in 47 games.

=== Seattle Mariners ===
Less than a year after joining the Red Sox, Aardsma was traded to the Seattle Mariners on January 20, 2009, for minor league pitcher Fabian Williamson. On April 10, he recorded the first save of his career, pitching two innings of relief against the Oakland Athletics.

The Mariners gave Aardsma a chance to close a game behind Brandon Morrow. Afterward, he became the team's official closer when Morrow was hurt.

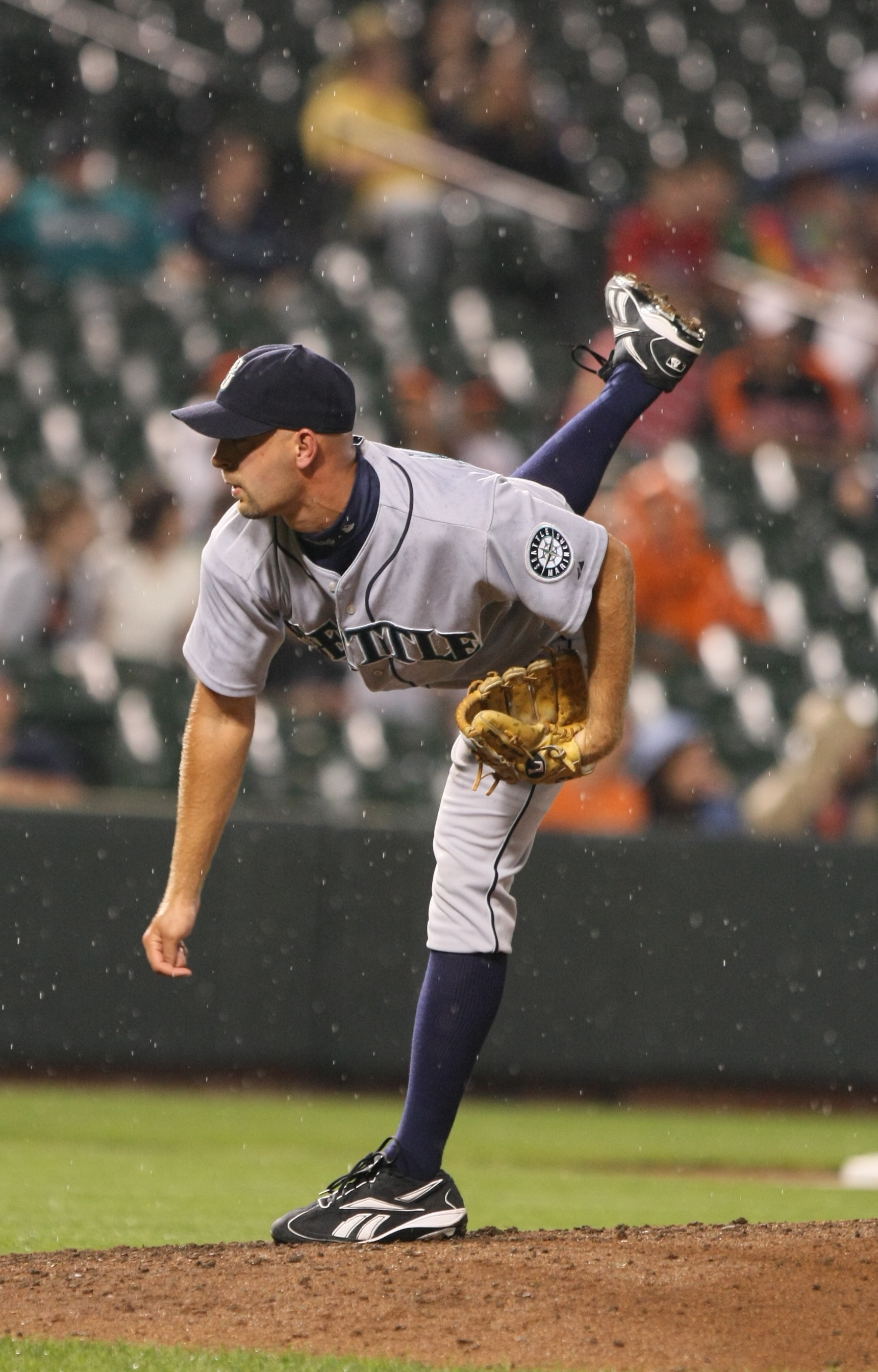
Aardsma during his tenure with the Seattle Mariners in 2009

Aardsma was a projected pick for the All-Star Game, but failed to make both the starting and the reserve roster. He finished the season with a 2.52 ERA and 38 saves in 71.1 innings.

He followed an outstanding 2009 season with an excellent 2010. Converting 31 of 35 save opportunities, he finished the year 19-for-20 in saves with a 1.80 ERA from June 13 to September 19. He became the first pitcher to earn 30 saves for a team that lost 100 games. He suffered an oblique injury in September that kept him out for the rest of the season.

He underwent surgery in the offseason to repair a torn labrum in his hip. While rehabbing from hip surgery, Aardsma suffered an elbow strain that ultimately required Tommy John surgery in July 2011. He was not offered arbitration by the Mariners and became a free agent after the season.

=== New York Yankees ===
On February 22, 2012, Aardsma signed a contract with the New York Yankees worth one year and $500,000 with a club option for 2013. Yankees general manager Brian Cashman was quoted as saying, "The move could help us in 2012, but it has a lot more eyes toward 2013." Aardsma was activated from the disabled list on September 25, 2012, after Steve Pearce and Justin Thomas were designated for assignment. He pitched in just one game for the Yankees, on September 27, and allowed one run in one inning.

On October 29, the Yankees elected to exercise Aardsma's incentive-laden $500,000 club option for 2013. However, they designated him for assignment before the start of the 2013 season. When no other team claimed him off waivers, he was released.

=== Miami Marlins ===
On April 11, 2013, Aardsma signed a minor league contract with the Miami Marlins and was assigned to the Triple-A New Orleans Zephyrs. After pitching in 10 games, he opted out of his contract on May 15, 2013.

=== New York Mets ===
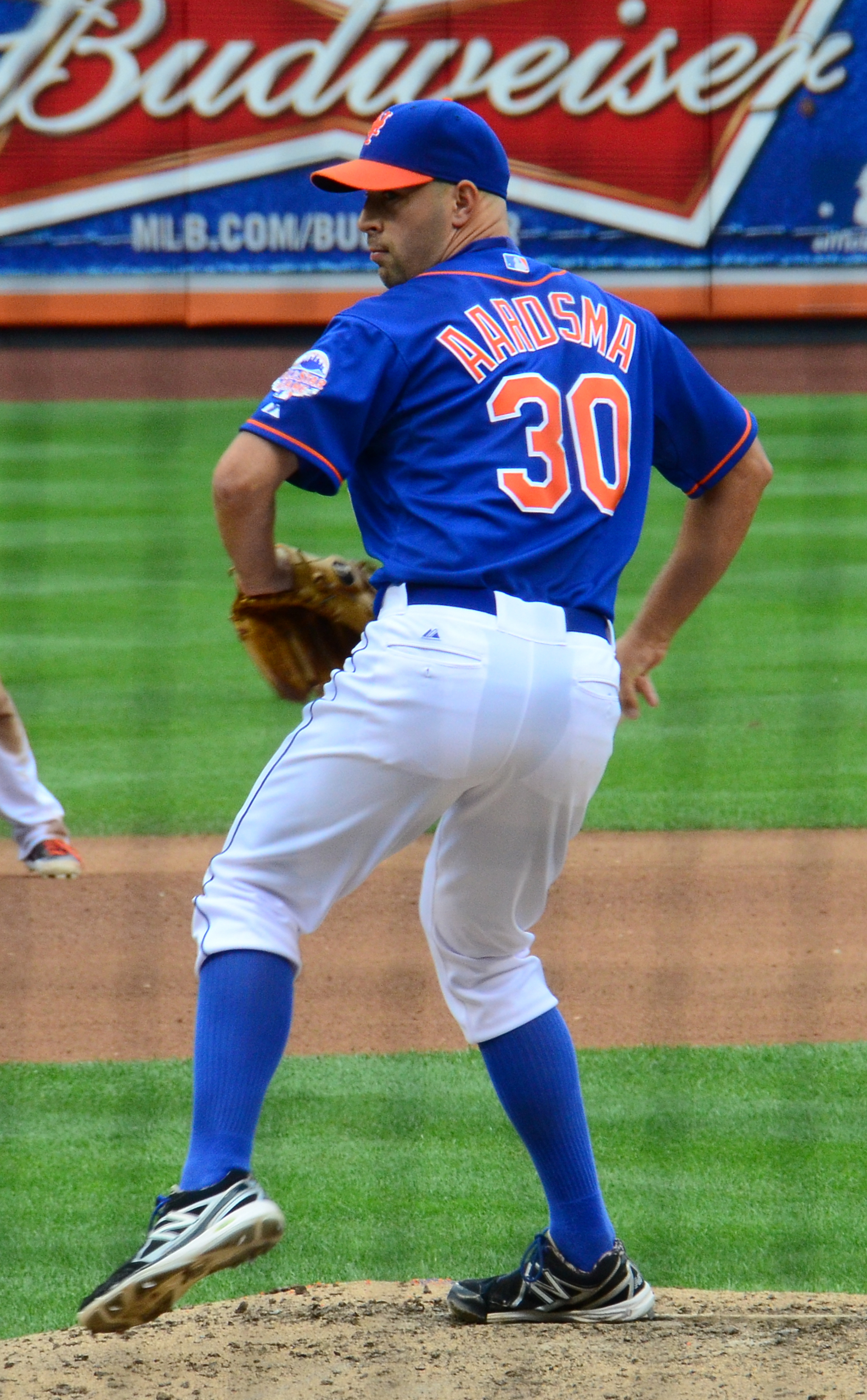
Aardsma pitching for the New York Mets in 2013

On May 20, 2013, Aardsma signed a minor league deal with the New York Mets. After pitching in eight games for the Triple-A Las Vegas 51s, he was promoted to the Mets on June 8, 2013. He appeared in 43 games for the Mets with a 4.31 ERA and a 2–2 record. He became a free agent following the season.

=== Cleveland Indians ===
On January 23, 2014, Aardsma signed a minor league deal with the Cleveland Indians. He was released on March 21, 2014, after not making the team in spring training.

=== St. Louis Cardinals ===
On March 26, 2014, Aardsma promptly signed a minor league deal with the St. Louis Cardinals. He played in 35 games in the Cardinals farm system, mostly with the Triple-A Memphis Redbirds, missing time after undergoing groin surgery. He finished the season going 4–1 with a 1.46 ERA and 11 saves. He became a free agent following the season on November 2.

=== Los Angeles Dodgers ===
On February 19, 2015, Aardsma signed a minor league contract with the Los Angeles Dodgers and was invited to spring training. He did not make the Dodgers opening day roster, and was instead assigned to the Triple-A Oklahoma City Dodgers. In 20 games with Oklahoma City, he had a 2.41 ERA and 18 saves. He opted out of his contract on June 4 and became a free agent.

=== Atlanta Braves ===
On June 7, 2015, Aardsma signed a minor league contract with the Atlanta Braves. He was added to the Major League roster on June 9. He was designated for assignment on August 24 after compiling a 4.99 ERA in 33 games for the Braves. He was released on September 1 and never pitched again in the major leagues.

=== Toronto Blue Jays ===
On February 5, 2016, Aardsma signed a minor league contract with an invitation to spring training with the Toronto Blue Jays. He was assigned to minor league camp on March 25. On May 23, Aardsma opted out of his contract.

=== Long Island Ducks ===
On April 3, 2017, Aardsma signed with the Long Island Ducks of the Atlantic League of Professional Baseball. He became a free agent following the season. In 23 games 22.1 innings of relief he went 1-2 with a 2.01 ERA with 31 strikeouts and 9 saves.

=== Retirement ===
Aardsma announced his retirement on February 5, 2018, and joined the Blue Jays front office as a coordinator of player development. He served as an analyst for SiriusXM during spring training before the 2023 season.

== Personal life ==
Aardsma is of Dutch descent, with all of his great-great-grandparents coming from the Netherlands. Because of this, he was slated to play for the Netherlands in the World Baseball Classic, but was ruled ineligible and did not play. Of all baseball players in history, the surname "Aardsma" ranks first alphabetically; his major league debut displaced Hall of Famer Hank Aaron. Aardsma's sister is American actress and beauty pageant contestant Amanda Aardsma.

Aardsma and his wife Andrea have a son, born on June 26, 2010.
