= Brandon Morrow =

American baseball player (born 1984)

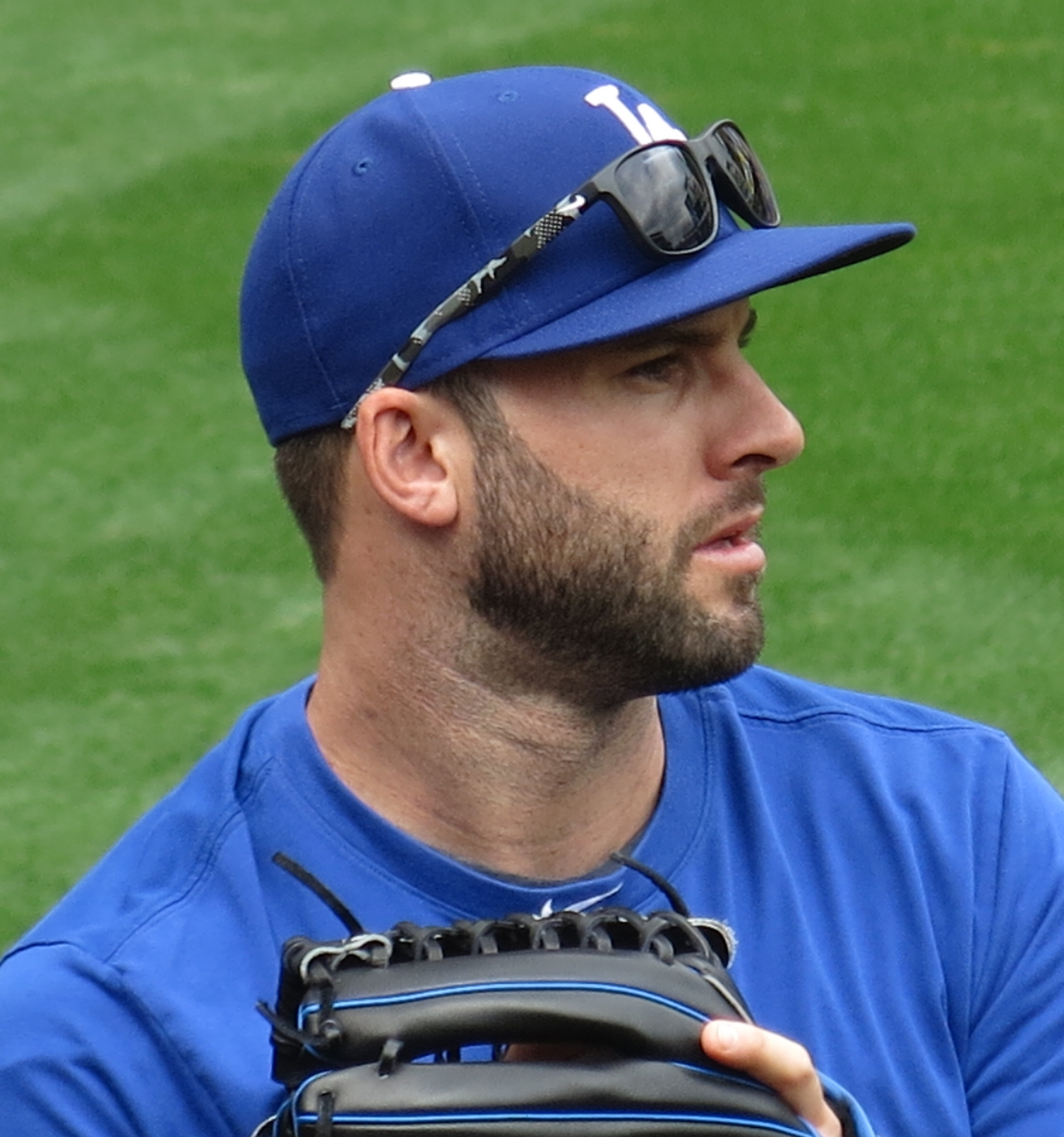
- Morrow with the Los Angeles Dodgers in 2017
- Pitcher
- Born: July 26, 1984 (age 42); Santa Rosa, California, U.S.
- Batted: Right Threw: Right

MLB debut
- April 3, 2007, for the Seattle Mariners

Last MLB appearance
- July 15, 2018, for the Chicago Cubs

Career statistics
- Win–loss record: 51–43
- Earned run average: 3.96
- Strikeouts: 877
- Stats at Baseball Reference

Teams
- Seattle Mariners (2007–2009); Toronto Blue Jays (2010–2014); San Diego Padres (2015–2016); Los Angeles Dodgers (2017); Chicago Cubs (2018)

Brandon John Morrow (born July 26, 1984) is an American former professional baseball pitcher. He played in Major League Baseball (MLB) for the Seattle Mariners, Toronto Blue Jays, San Diego Padres, Los Angeles Dodgers, and Chicago Cubs.

Born in Santa Rosa, California, Morrow attended Rancho Cotate High School in nearby Rohnert Park. He was drafted by the Anaheim Angels in 2003, but didn't sign and instead went to the University of California Berkeley.

During his MLB career, Morrow pitched for five teams across twelve years, finishing his career with a 51-43 win–loss record and an ERA of 3.69.

== Amateur career ==
=== High school ===
Morrow attended Rancho Cotate High School in Rohnert Park, California. As a senior, he was 9–2 with a 0.61 ERA and had 84 strikeouts in 63 innings. He earned first-team all-league, first-team All-Redwood Empire, first-team All-North Coast Section and second-team all-state honors, and competed for the California All-Stars at the 2002 Sunbelt Classic in McAlester, Oklahoma.

He was selected by the Anaheim Angels in the 40th round, 1200th overall, in the 2003 Major League Baseball draft. However, he did not sign with the Angels and decided to attend college at UC Berkeley. He majored in American studies.

=== College ===
Morrow attended the University of California. He appeared in 19 games for the Golden Bears with five starts in his freshman year, going 1–3 with a 6.07 ERA and 18 strikeouts in 30 innings. He picked up the win in relief versus the University of California Los Angeles on April 25 going one inning, surrendering one hit, and striking out two. Morrow had three strikeouts in two innings against Brigham Young University on January 30.

As a sophomore Morrow made ten appearances with five starts, going 0–1 with a 9.36 ERA and one save. He had 25 strikeouts in 25 innings. He earned his lone save on March 19 against the University of Hawaii at Hilo with three strikeouts in two innings. He threw a career-high five innings with a career-high six strikeouts against Loyola Marymount University on February 13.

Morrow was named first-team All-Pac-10 his junior year, going 7–4 with a 2.05 ERA, second in Pac-10. He had 97 strikeouts, fourth in Pac-10. He held opponents to a .211 average good enough for third in Pac-10. Morrow was named National Pitcher of the Week after pitching seven innings, no hits, no runs, one walk and a career-high 12 strikeouts against University of California, Irvine.

Morrow played collegiate summer baseball for the Yarmouth-Dennis Red Sox of the Cape Cod Baseball League in 2004 and 2005, and was named a league all-star in 2005, striking out 24 batters in 15 innings with a 1.84 ERA and three saves. He was named a third-team preseason All-American and the fifth-best professional prospect out of the Cape Cod League by Baseball America.

== Professional career ==
=== Seattle Mariners ===
==== 2006 ====
In his first professional season in 2006 he split time between Arizona League Mariners appearing in seven games and Single-A Inland Empire 66ers appearing in one game of the California League. He posted an 0–2 record overall with a 2.25 ERA in 16 innings striking out 17 batters and starting five games. He pitched three hitless innings for Inland Empire during his brief time there.

==== 2007 ====
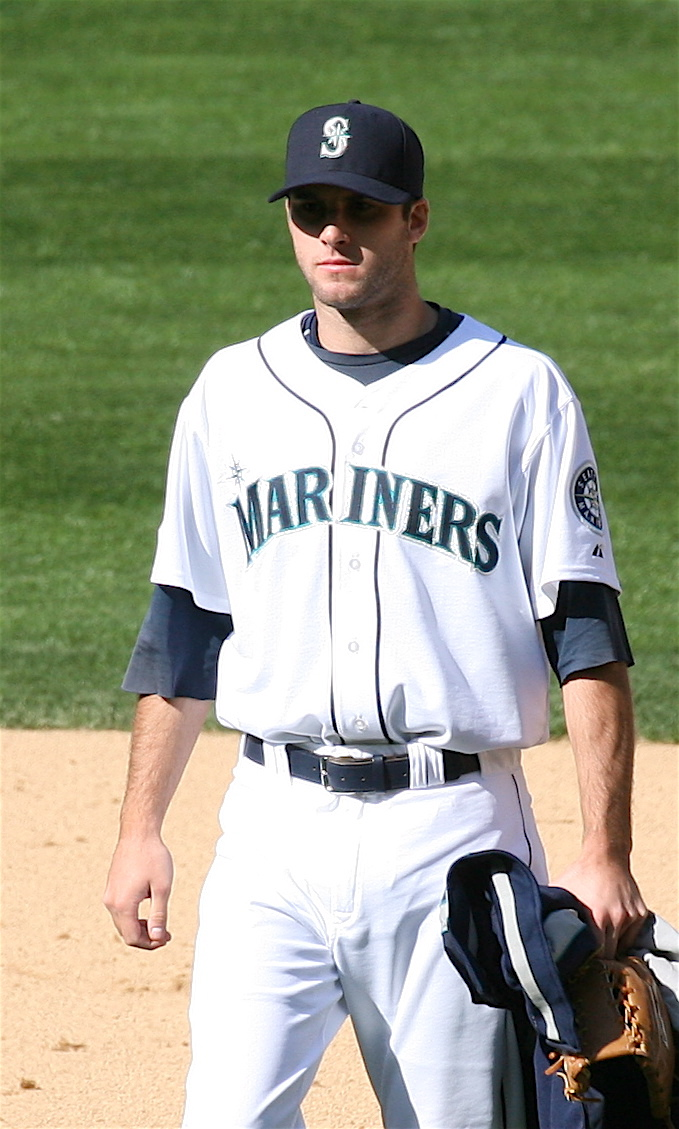
Morrow with the Seattle Mariners in 2007

Morrow was invited to spring training in 2007. He went 0–1 with a 1.08 ERA in 6 relief appearances and made the major league club despite being considered a long-shot to make the club at the start of spring.

Morrow made his Major League debut on April 3 against the Oakland Athletics, pitching one scoreless inning.

Morrow went 3–4, with a 4.12 ERA in 60 appearances striking out 66 batters and walking 50. He held opposing hitters to a .243 batting average, including .221 against right-handed batters. He set a club rookie record with 18 holds, breaking old record of 13 set by Ed Vande Berg in 1982. Morrow had the fourth most appearances by a rookie reliever in club history with 60 and fifth most strikeouts with 66. Among American League rookie relievers Morrow ranked second in strikeouts, third in appearances and fourth in ERA.

On April 23, he earned his first major league win against the Texas Rangers, allowing one hit in career-high three and one third innings pitched. He recorded 18 and two thirds consecutive scoreless innings from April 20 to June 8. During the streak he went 2–0 while holding opposing batters to a .103 average. He also recorded another scoreless streak of 17 innings pitched over 15 outings from July 17 to August 24. Morrow held opponents scoreless in 44 of 60 outings.

==== 2008 ====
After missing two weeks of spring training in 2008 due to a sore shoulder, Morrow was optioned to the Mariners minor league affiliate Double-A West Tennessee on March 30. Morrow was recalled to the Seattle bullpen 17 days afterwards when Mariners starter Érik Bédard was placed on the 15-day disabled list. When Seattle's regular closer J. J. Putz became injured on June 12, Morrow took over his duties. Including a closing appearance on June 11, Morrow saved 8 games in 8 tries, before a July 10 opportunity when he gave up two solo home runs to the Oakland Athletics to acquire his first blown save. He had only given up 2 runs all year prior to that, and had 40 strikeouts in 36.2 innings pitched, and a very low ERA of 1.76 and WHIP of 0.88.

On August 5, Morrow was optioned to Triple-A to become a starting pitcher.

Morrow made his first MLB start on September 5, against the New York Yankees. Morrow went 7 2/3 no-hit innings in his first major league start and was 4 outs away to being just the second player to throw a no-hitter in their MLB starting debut only to see pinch hitter Wilson Betemit end his bid. The Mariners went on to win the game 3–1, giving Morrow his first win as a starter.

==== 2009 ====
On March 29, 2009 the Mariners announced that Morrow would no longer be used as a starting pitcher; instead, he would move into a relief role with the organization. Morrow, who has Type 1 diabetes, acknowledged that his diabetes was a factor in the decision, saying that it was easier to balance his blood sugar in a relief position.

Morrow began the season as the closer and earned five saves through the end of April. However, he was placed on the disabled list on May 2 after he developed right biceps tendinitis. David Aardsma served as closer in his absence.

After coming off the disabled list Morrow returned to the starting rotation, making six starts before being optioned to the Triple-A Tacoma Rainiers to develop back into a more rounded starting pitcher.

On August 14, Morrow pitched a four hit shutout against the Iowa Cubs. During that game Morrow struck out two, walked one and threw 59 of 96 pitches for strikes. Morrow retired 10 straight batters early in the game.

Morrow won his fifth consecutive decision for Tacoma tossing five scoreless innings to lead the Rainiers to a 4–1 win over the Portland Beavers on August 29. Morrow was removed from the game because of stiffness in his arm.

On September 9, Morrow was called up to the Mariners. He was to start at least one game, so manager Don Wakamatsu could assess Morrow's progress. On September 30, Morrow gave up one hit and walked two hitters in 8 shutout innings against the Oakland Athletics. The Mariners won the game 7–0.

=== Toronto Blue Jays ===
On December 22, 2009, the Mariners traded Morrow to the Toronto Blue Jays for pitcher Brandon League and minor league outfielder Johermyn Chávez.

==== 2010 ====
Morrow's first season in Toronto was the first of his major league career as a full-time member of a starting rotation. Toronto's coaching staff altered Morrow's delivery in a similar fashion to the way Roy Halladay's delivery was altered during his first years with the Blue Jays. The switch from an over-the-top arm motion to a lower-angle arm slot was believed to have contributed to an increased command of his pitches. He was also encouraged to reduce his pitch velocity and try to induce weak contact, again much in the same way Halladay was taught during his tenure in Toronto. Despite some struggles with inconsistency during the early stages of the alterations, statistics show that his production stabilized as the season progressed and he managed to produce favorable results on a regular basis before the end of the season, including a stellar 17 strikeout, one hit performance that was a candidate for MLB.com's This Year in Baseball Performance of the Year.

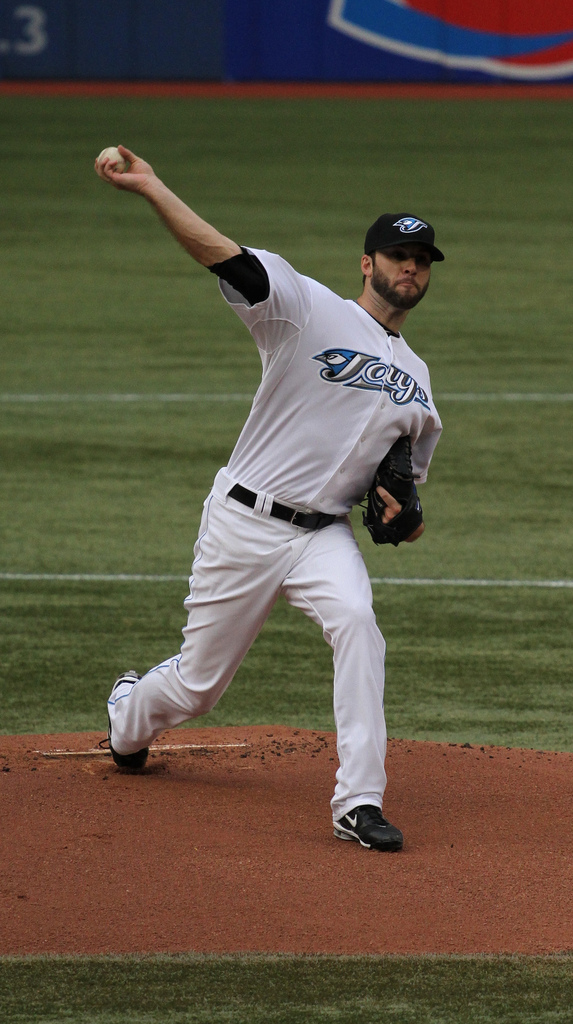
Morrow pitching for the Blue Jays in 2011

On August 8, Morrow was one out away from a no-hitter against the Tampa Bay Rays when Evan Longoria hit an infield single. It would have been the first no-hitter by a Blue Jay since Dave Stieb's no-hitter on September 2, 1990. He finished the one-hitter for his first complete game while compiling 17 strikeouts, a career high for Morrow in a game and one strikeout shy of the team record of 18 strikeouts set by Roger Clemens in 1998. According to the Game Score metric devised by sabremetrician Bill James, this tied for the fourth-highest rated nine-inning pitching performance since 1920, with a game score of 100.

On August 29, the Blue Jays announced that after his next start, Morrow would be shut down for the season to protect his arm. He pitched more innings in 2010 (146 1/3) than in any of his previous seasons. He finished the season with a 10–7 record, 4.49 ERA, and 178 strikeouts. Morrow was nominated as one of 2010's "Ten People Making a Difference in Diabetes".

==== 2011 ====
Morrow, who was expected to be the Jays' number 2 starter in the rotation, began the season on the 15-day disabled list with right forearm inflammation. He made his regular-season debut on April 23 against the Tampa Bay Rays, pitching 5 1/3 innings, giving up 3 hits, 2 runs, 2 walks, and 10 strikeouts.

For the first time since being traded, Morrow returned to Seattle to face the Mariners on August 17. Morrow recorded the win, pitching 6 innings and striking out 12 batters.

Morrow became the first pitcher in major league history to pitch 100 innings in one season without the team recording a double play behind him. On September 23, after 173 1/3 innings dating back to August 28, 2010, Desmond Jennings of the Tampa Bay Rays grounded into Morrow's first double play in 30 starts. It was Morrow's only double play induced in 2011 and also the only double play Jennings would ground into all season. Morrow finished the season with an 11–11 record, 4.79 ERA, and 203 strikeouts. He led the league with 10.2 strikeouts per 9 innings.

==== 2012 ====
On May 3, in a game against the Los Angeles Angels of Anaheim, Morrow threw a three-hit complete-game shutout. The following night, teammate Henderson Álvarez also threw a complete-game shutout. Morrow and Álvarez thus became the first Blue Jays starters to throw back-to-back shutouts since Jack Morris and Al Leiter did so on June 16 and 17, 1993. Morrow established a career high in complete games and shutouts (with 2 each) on May 19, throwing a three-hit shutout against the New York Mets. He improved that mark on June 6 against the Chicago White Sox, throwing a complete game two-hit shutout. His third shutout of the season gave him the league lead at the time.

Morrow experienced "stabbing pain" during the first inning of his June 11 start while pitching to Bryce Harper, the second hitter in the Washington Nationals lineup. After delivering three pitches to Harper, Morrow left the game with a strain of the left oblique muscles. Morrow returned from the 60-day disabled list on August 25. In 124 2/3 innings, he finished the season with a 10–7 record, 2.96 ERA, and 103 strikeouts.

==== 2013 ====
On February 5, 2013, manager John Gibbons named Morrow the number 2 starter for the upcoming season, behind reigning NL Cy Young Award winner R. A. Dickey. After opening the season with a 2–3 record and a 5.63 earned run average, Morrow was placed on the 15-day disabled list on June 1 with a right forearm strain. He made his first rehab start at High-A Dunedin on June 17, and pitched just 2 innings. On June 18, it was announced that Morrow had been pulled from rehabilitation after suffering an unnamed setback during his start. An MRI that day revealed only inflammation, and no structural damage in Morrow's arm.

On July 24, it was reported by Rogers Sportsnet that Morrow was diagnosed with an entrapped radial nerve in his right forearm, and would likely miss the rest of the 2013 season. Blue Jays management said the following day that they expected Morrow to pitch again in 2013, either in late September or in October's instructional league in Florida. Manager John Gibbons later said on August 22 that Morrow would remain on the disabled list for the rest of the season. In 2013, Morrow posted a record of 2–3, a 5.63 earned run average, and 41 strikeouts over just 54 1/3 innings pitched.

==== 2014 ====
Morrow struggled throughout early spring training, giving up 7 earned runs through just 8 innings pitched. On March 18, manager John Gibbons confirmed that Morrow would be the team's fifth starter, citing a need to give him more time to prepare for the regular season. After struggling to open the season, including a start on April 26 where he walked 8 Red Sox batters over 2 2/3 innings, Morrow was placed on the 15-day disabled list on May 3 with a sprained right index finger. Later that day his injury was determined to be a more severe torn tendon sheath in his right hand, and he was transferred to the 60-day DL. Morrow made his first rehab appearance on August 27 with the Dunedin Blue Jays, pitching one scoreless inning. He was activated from the 60-day DL and added to the Blue Jays active roster on September 1, 2014. On November 1, the Blue Jays declined Morrow's $10 million 2015 option, making him a free agent.

=== San Diego Padres ===
On December 16, 2014, Morrow signed a one-year, $2.5 million contract with the San Diego Padres. He made 5 starts with the Padres in 2015, posting a 2.73 ERA and 23 strikeouts, before going on the disabled list with right shoulder inflammation in early May. He remained on the disabled list into August, when it was determined that he required season-ending surgery to correct a shoulder impingement. On December 17, Morrow signed a minor league contract with the Padres that included an invitation to spring training.

=== Los Angeles Dodgers ===
On January 25, 2017, Morrow signed a minor-league contract with the Los Angeles Dodgers that included an invitation to major league spring training. He did not make the major league team and was assigned to the Triple-A Oklahoma City Dodgers to begin the season. Morrow was called up by the Dodgers on May 29, due to a clause in his contract that would have forced the Dodgers to waive him if he wasn't called up. By the end of the season, Morrow had settled into a role as the Dodgers' setup man. In 45 appearances out of the Dodgers bullpen, he was 6–0 with a 2.06 ERA with 50 strikeouts and two saves.

Morrow allowed one run in 3 2/3 innings in the 2017 NLDS, zero runs in 4 2/3 innings in the 2017 NLCS and five runs in 5 1/3 innings in the 2017 World Series. He was only the second person in history to pitch in all seven games of a World Series, Darold Knowles having done so in 1973.

=== Chicago Cubs ===
On December 12, 2017, Morrow signed a two-year, $21-million contract with the Chicago Cubs.

On June 20, 2018, Morrow was placed on the 10-day disabled list due to back tightness.

On August 21, 2019, he was shut down for the season due to lingering problems in his elbow. On November 4, 2019, Morrow elected free agency. On December 14, 2019, Morrow re-signed with the Cubs on a minor league deal.

The Cubs organization released Morrow on July 8, 2020.

=== Los Angeles Dodgers (second stint) ===
On December 11, 2020, Morrow signed a minor league contract to return to the Los Angeles Dodgers organization. However, he struggled with his rehab and did not pitch for the Dodgers at any level during the 2021 season. Morrow elected free agency following the season on November 7, 2021.

== Pitching style ==
Morrow threw a hard fastball which sat between 92 and 100 mph. He had the ability to throw several off-speed pitches, including a slider (85–89 mph), curveball (81–85 mph), and change-up (81–87 mph). In September 2011, Morrow debuted a new cut fastball which came from making a slight adjustment on his slider, with velocity hovering around 88–91 mph.

== Personal life ==
Morrow is 6 ft 3 in (1.91 m) tall and weighs 195 pounds (88 kg). He is married. His favorite pitcher growing up was Pedro Martínez.

Morrow was diagnosed with Type 1 diabetes his senior year of high school. He wears an insulin pump to regulate his blood sugar levels.
