= Corpas =

Corpas is a surname. Notable people with the surname include:

- José Corpas (born 1991), Spanish football right winger
- Jesús Javier Corpas Mauleón, Spanish writer
- Manny Corpas (born 1982), Panamanian baseball field manager
- Manuel Corpas (scientist), biologist
