= Don Wakamatsu =

American baseball player and manager (born 1963)

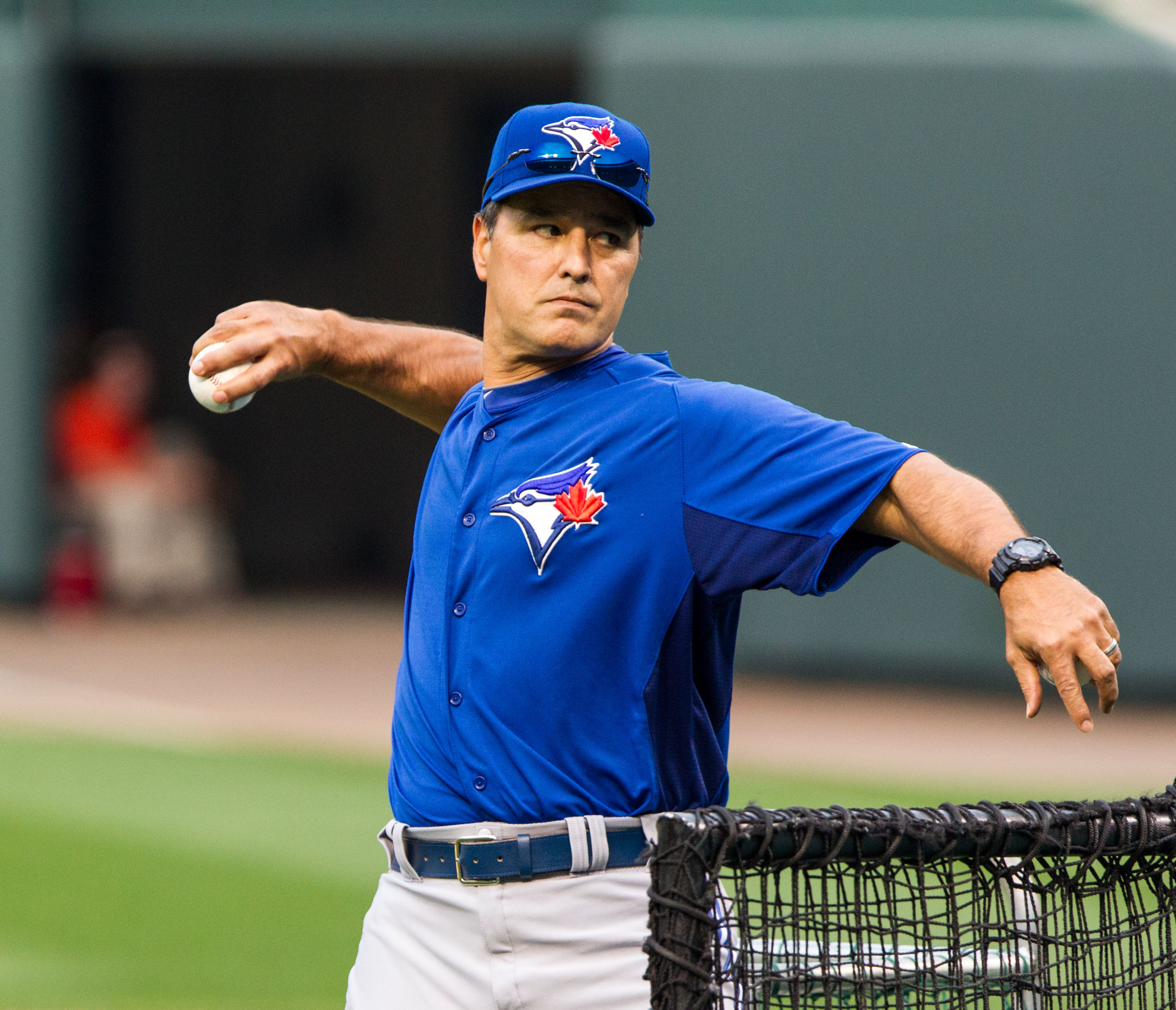
- Wakamatsu with the Toronto Blue Jays
- Catcher / Manager
- Born: February 22, 1963 (age 63); Hood River, Oregon, U.S.
- Batted: Right Threw: Right

MLB debut
- May 22, 1991, for the Chicago White Sox

Last MLB appearance
- October 5, 1991, for the Chicago White Sox

MLB statistics
- Batting average: .226
- Hits: 7
- Runs: 2
- Managerial record: 130–154
- Winning %: .458
- Stats at Baseball Reference
- Managerial record at Baseball Reference

Teams
- As player: Chicago White Sox (1991); As manager: Seattle Mariners (2009–2010); Texas Rangers (2018); As coach: Texas Rangers (2003–2007); Oakland Athletics (2008); Toronto Blue Jays (2011–2012); Kansas City Royals (2014–2017); Texas Rangers (2018–2021)

Career highlights and awards
- World Series champion (2015)

Wilbur Donald Wakamatsu (born February 22, 1963) is an American former professional baseball player, scout, coach, and manager. Wakamatsu was drafted in the 11th round of the 1985 Major League Baseball draft by the Cincinnati Reds. He played as a catcher in Major League Baseball for the Chicago White Sox. He served as the bench coach of the Texas Rangers from 2018 through 2021. He was hired as bench coach of the Kansas City Royals for the 2014 season. He was the manager of the Seattle Mariners for the 2009 season, as well as the majority of the 2010 season. He was the Toronto Blue Jays' bench coach for 2011 and 2012, after which he was replaced by DeMarlo Hale. During the 2013 season he worked as a scout for the New York Yankees in the Dallas/Fort Worth area. He is currently the first-ever executive vice president of baseball operations with the Oakland Ballers.

== Playing career ==
=== High school and collegiate ===
Wakamatsu was a three-sport star at the Bay Area's Hayward High School in California, and ultimately chose baseball over football due to his lack of size. He and former Oakland Raiders head coach Jack Del Rio were baseball and football teammates.

He was also an All-Pac-10 catcher during his last three years at Arizona State University, where he was a teammate of Barry Bonds and Alvin Davis. He was drafted by the New York Yankees as the last pick of the 1984 Major League Baseball draft, but decided to return to ASU.

=== Professional ===
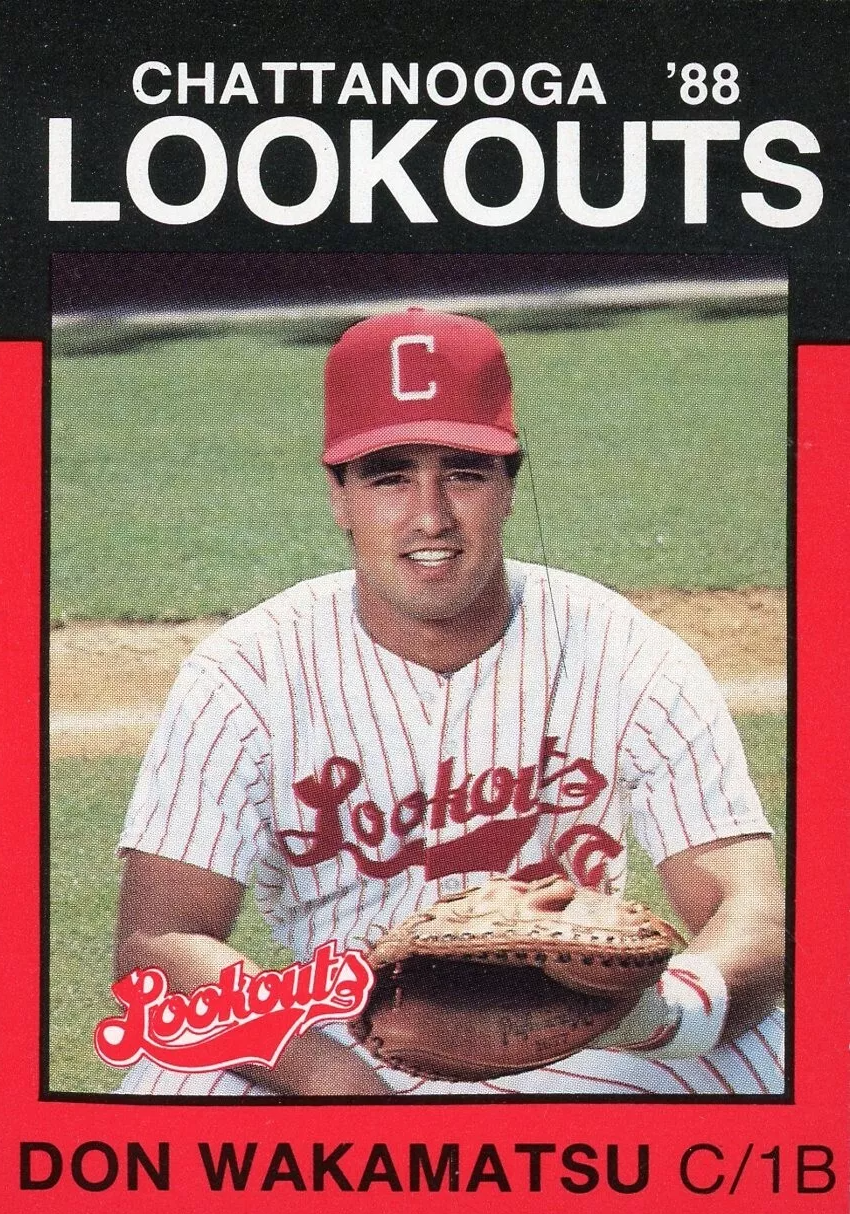
A 1988 baseball card of Wakamatsu with the Chattanooga Lookouts

Wakamatsu was drafted in the 11th round of the 1985 Major League Baseball draft by the Cincinnati Reds. He reached the Double-A level before the Reds released him before the 1989 season.

Shortly after the Reds released him, he signed with the Chicago White Sox, who assigned him to the Double-A Birmingham Barons. He spent 1990 and most of 1991 with the Triple-A Vancouver Canadians before getting his only call to the big leagues in May 1991. Wakamatsu played 18 games in the majors as a backup catcher for the White Sox in 1991, working in all of his starts for knuckleballer Charlie Hough.

After the 1991 season the White Sox granted Wakamatsu free agency, and he signed with the Los Angeles Dodgers shortly after. He spent 1992–1996 playing at the Double-A and Triple-A levels in the Dodgers, Texas Rangers, Cleveland Indians, Seattle Mariners and Milwaukee Brewers organizations before his playing career ended at age 33.

== Coaching career ==
=== Minor leagues ===
Following his playing retirement, Wakamatsu became a minor league manager in the Arizona Diamondbacks system, managing the Arizona League Diamondbacks in 1997, the Class-A High Desert Mavericks in 1998, and the Double-A El Paso Diablos in 1999. In 1998 he was named Manager of the Year in the California League, after leading the High Desert Mavericks to the playoffs.

He spent 2000 managing the Erie SeaWolves, the Anaheim Angels' Double-A affiliate, and then the next two seasons as a roving catching instructor in the Angels organization.

=== Major leagues ===
From 2003 to 2006, Wakamatsu was the Texas Rangers' bench coach. During the 2006 season, he served as manager for two games while Buck Showalter was in the hospital with an irregular heartbeat brought about due to dehydration, and in 2007, took the third base coach job when Ron Washington took over as manager. He spent 2008 as the bench coach of the Oakland Athletics.

On November 19, 2008, Wakamatsu was named the manager of the Seattle Mariners, replacing interim manager Jim Riggleman, and becoming the first Asian-American manager in the majors.

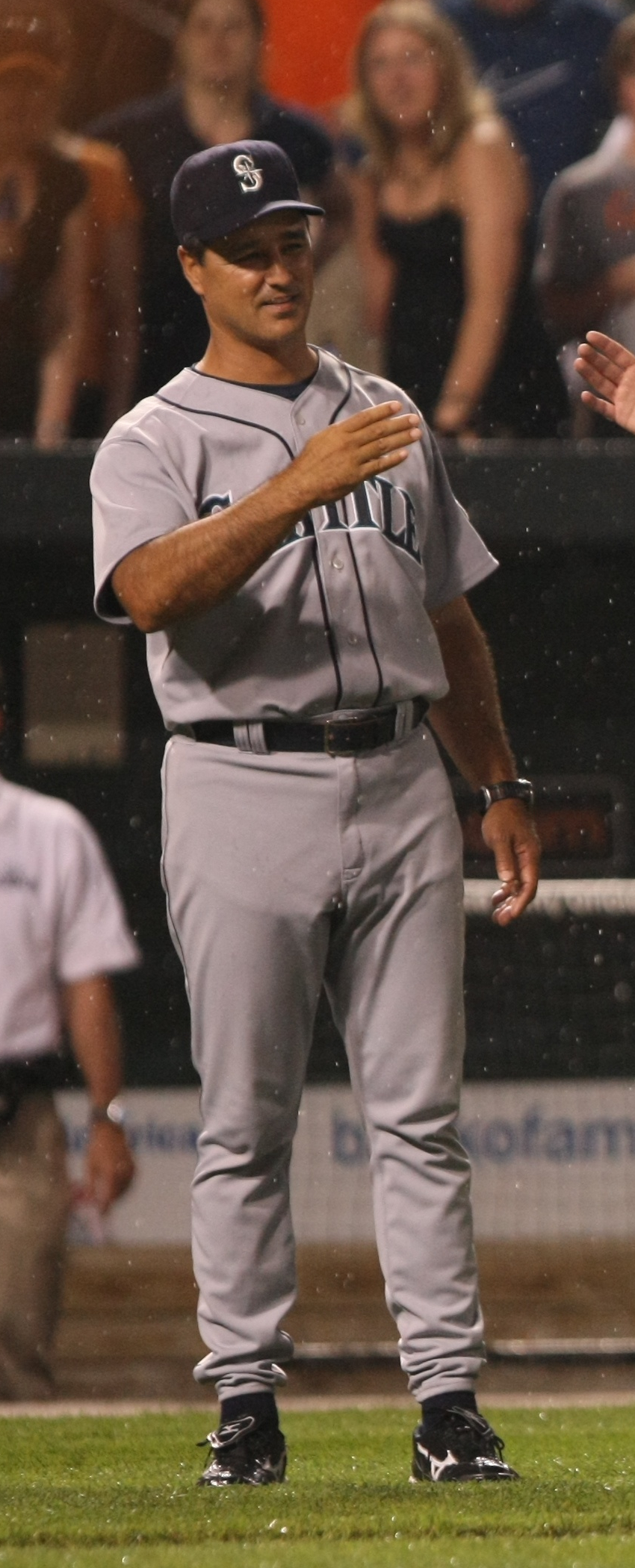
Wakamatsu in 2009

On April 6, 2009, Wakamatsu won his managerial debut as the Mariners beat the Minnesota Twins 6–1 on Opening Day.

Later in the season, Wakamatsu was officially selected as a coach under Tampa Bay Rays manager Joe Maddon for the 2009 MLB All-Star Game in St. Louis along with Kansas City Royals manager Trey Hillman on June 17, 2009.

Fred Claire, former baseball executive and current writer for MLB.com, stated that Wakamatsu and his staff, composed of bench coach Ty Van Burkleo, pitching coach Rick Adair, hitting coach Alan Cockrell, first base coach Lee Tinsley, bullpen coach John Wetteland and performance coach Steve Hecht, deserved credit for a 24-game improvement. Claire wrote this about Wakamatsu:

It is the relationships that Wakamatsu has built during his time in baseball that defines him best. He was somewhat of an unknown to the public when he was hired as the Mariners' manager last November, but he is well-known and highly respected within the game.

On May 20, 2010, during a game against the Toronto Blue Jays, Wakamatsu received his first career ejection. As of June 12, 2010, he had a career total of two ejections.

On August 9, 2010, amidst one of the worst seasons in team history, Wakamatsu was fired as Mariners manager. He finished with a record of 127 wins and 147 losses.

On November 8, 2010, Wakamatsu was announced as the new bench coach for the Toronto Blue Jays, under new manager John Farrell.

During 2013, Wakamatsu worked as a professional talent scout for the New York Yankees.

On October 25, 2013, Wakamatsu was announced as the new bench coach for the Kansas City Royals.

On April 19, 2015, Wakamatsu was one of five Royals (also pitching coach Dave Eiland, manager Ned Yost, pitcher Kelvin Herrera and shortstop Alcides Escobar) to be ejected in a game against the Oakland Athletics. Two games prior, Escobar had been injured following an attempt by A's third baseman Brett Lawrie to break up a double play. Considering the slide a dirty one, Royals pitcher Yordano Ventura hit Lawrie in the elbow the following game and was immediately ejected. In the series finale, A's pitcher Scott Kazmir hit Lorenzo Cain in the foot and warnings were given. Yost and Eiland were immediately ejected for arguing. Later in the 8th inning, Kelvin Herrera threw a 100 mph fastball behind Lawrie and a trio of ejections followed (Herrera, Wakamatsu and Escobar). The Royals would end up winning the game 4–2 despite the ejections. Wakamatsu was actually ejected twice, as when a warning has been issued, the pitcher and manager are automatically ejected. Wakamatsu was the acting manager. This was the cause of his first ejection, the second being him arguing with the home plate umpire.

The Rangers hired Wakamatsu as their bench coach before the 2018 season. When manager Jeff Banister was fired in September 2018, Wakamatsu took over as interim manager. He finished with a record of three wins and seven losses. He returned to his position as bench coach for the following season. Wakamatsu was let go by Texas following the 2021 season.

=== Managerial record ===
As of September 30, 2018

Team	Year	Regular season					Postseason			
Team	Year	Games	Won	Lost	Win %	Finish	Won	Lost	Win %	Result
SEA	2009	162	85	77	.525	3rd in AL West	–	–	–	–
SEA	2010	112	42	70	.375	Fired	–	–	–	–
SEA total		274	127	147	.464		–	–	–	
TEX	2018	10	3	7	.300	5th in AL West	–	–	–	–
TEX total		10	3	7	.300		–	–	–	
Total		284	130	154	.458		–	–	–	

== Independent baseball ==
In 2023, Wakamatsu was hired as the executive vice president of the Oakland Ballers, a new team in the independent Pioneer Baseball League created to replace the Oakland Athletics after the team's relocation to Las Vegas.

== Personal life ==
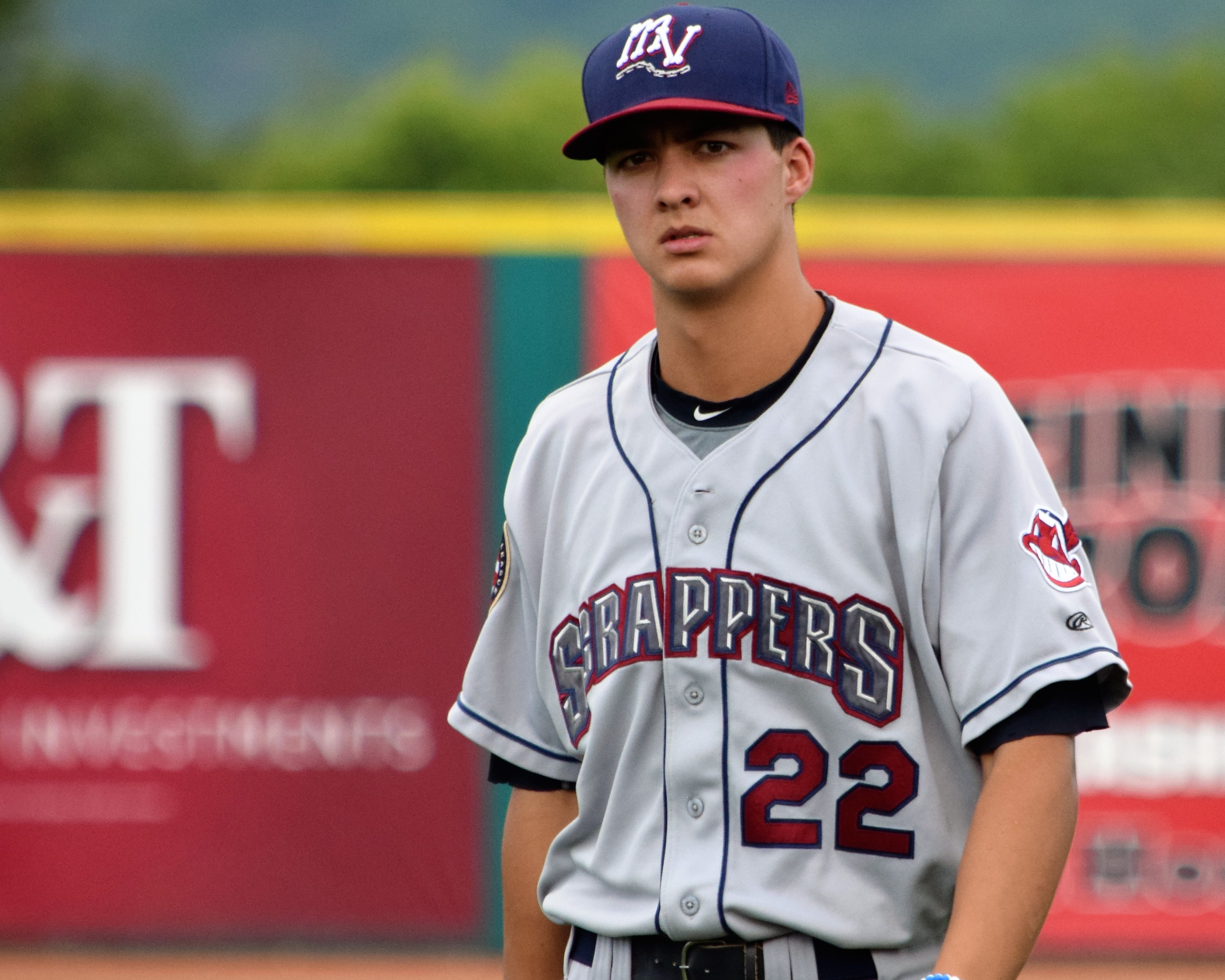
Luke Wakamatsu with the Mahoning Valley Scrappers in 2016

Wakamatsu is married to Iowa native Laura Lynn Mullin. He resides in North Richland Hills, Texas with wife, and their three children, sons Jacob and Lucas and daughter Jadyn. Both his sons are also baseball players. Jake was drafted by the Toronto Blue Jays in the 48th round of the 2011 MLB draft and played in the Kansas City Royals organization. Luke was drafted in the 20th round of the 2015 MLB draft.

Born to a Japanese American ironworker father and an Irish American dental assistant mother, he is fourth generation Japanese American and the first Asian-American manager in Major League Baseball history. His paternal great-grandparents emigrated from Japan to Orting, Washington in the early 20th century and settled in Hood River, Oregon, where Wakamatsu was born. His father was born in the Tule Lake War Relocation Center, a Japanese American internment camp located in Northern California near the Oregon border. Close friends and players call him Wak (pronounced "wok").

Sporting positions
Preceded by Dwayne Murphy	AZL Diamondbacks Manager; 1997 (with Brian Butterfield)	Succeeded by Mike Brumley
Preceded by Chris Speier	High Desert Mavericks Manager; 1998	Succeeded by Derek Bryant
Preceded by Ed Romero	El Paso Diablos Manager; 1999	Succeeded by Bobby Dickerson
Preceded by Garry Templeton	Erie SeaWolves Manager; 2000	Succeeded by Luis Pujols
Preceded by Terry Francona	Texas Rangers Bench Coach; 2003–2006	Succeeded by Art Howe
Preceded by Steve Smith	Texas Rangers Third Base Coach; 2007	Succeeded by Matt Walbeck
Preceded by Bob Schaefer	Oakland Athletics Bench Coach; 2008	Succeeded by Todd Steverson
Preceded by Nick Leyva	Toronto Blue Jays bench coach 2011–2012	Succeeded by DeMarlo Hale
Preceded by Chino Cadahia	Kansas City Royals bench coach 2014–2017	Succeeded by Dale Sveum
Preceded by Steve Buechele	Texas Rangers bench coach 2018–2021	Succeeded by Donnie Ecker
