= Josh Wilson (baseball) =

American baseball player (born 1981)

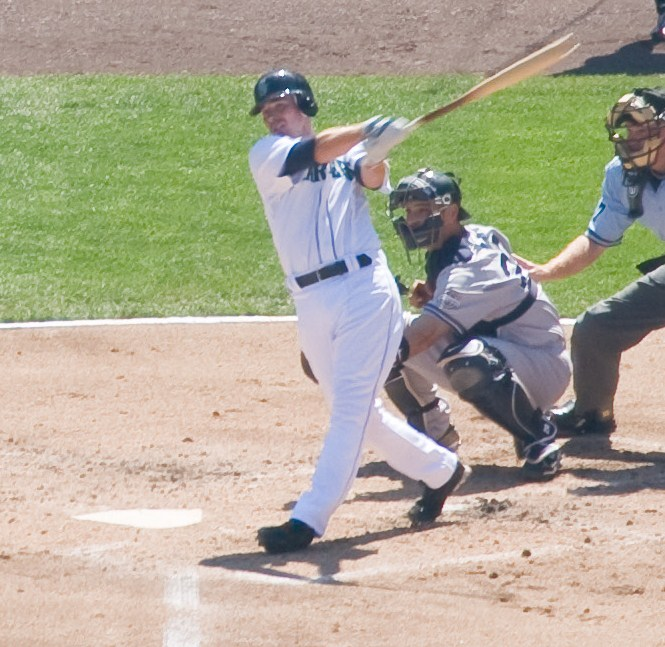
- Wilson with the Seattle Mariners in 2009
- Infielder
- Born: March 26, 1981 (age 45); Pittsburgh, Pennsylvania, U.S.
- Batted: Right Threw: Right

MLB debut
- September 7, 2005, for the Florida Marlins

Last MLB appearance
- October 4, 2015, for the Detroit Tigers

MLB statistics
- Batting average: .229
- Home runs: 10
- Runs batted in: 84
- Stats at Baseball Reference

Teams
- Florida Marlins (2005); Washington Nationals (2007); Tampa Bay Devil Rays (2007); Arizona Diamondbacks (2009); San Diego Padres (2009); Seattle Mariners (2009–2010); Arizona Diamondbacks (2011); Milwaukee Brewers (2011); Arizona Diamondbacks (2013); Texas Rangers (2014); Detroit Tigers (2015)

Joshua Aaron Wilson (born March 26, 1981) is an American former professional baseball infielder. Wilson is a Mt. Lebanon, Pennsylvania native. He was part of the 1998 Pennsylvania state championship baseball team and Pennsylvania Player of the Year. Wilson played in Major League Baseball (MLB) for the Florida Marlins, Washington Nationals, Tampa Bay Devil Rays, Arizona Diamondbacks, San Diego Padres, Seattle Mariners, Milwaukee Brewers, Texas Rangers, and Detroit Tigers.

== Playing career ==
=== Florida Marlins ===
Wilson was drafted by the Florida Marlins in the third round of the 1999 Major League Baseball draft. Wilson passed up a scholarship to Louisiana State University to sign with the Marlins. He received a $400,000 signing bonus. Wilson began his professional career with the Gulf Coast League Marlins. Wilson batted .266 with 54 hits, 9 doubles, 4 triples, 27 runs batted in (RBI), and 14 stolen bases in 53 games. On the team, Wilson was first in plate appearances (237), at-bats (203), hits; was tied for first in runs (29), triples; and was second in doubles, and RBIs. In 2000, Wilson split the season between the Low-A Utica Blue Sox of the New York–Penn League and the Single-A Kane County Cougars of the Midwest League. With the Blue Sox, Wilson batted .344 with 89 hits, 13 doubles, six triples, three home runs, 43 RBI, and nine stolen bases in 66 games. Wilson was second in the New York—Penn League in batting average, and was tied for second in hits. After his stint with the Blue Sox, Wilson was promoted to the Kane County Cougars. With the Cougars, he batted .269 with 14 hits, three doubles, one triple, one home run, and six RBI in 13 games. The next season, 2001, Wilson played for the Single-A Kane County Cougars. He batted .285 with 144 hits, 28 doubles, 5 triples, 4 home runs, 61 RBI, and 17 stolen bases in 123 games. Wilson was second on the Cougars in doubles, and caught stealing (11); and was third in games played, plate appearances (546), at-bats (506), hits, doubles, and stolen bases.

Wilson was called up to the Marlins in September 2005. He made his Major League debut on September 7 against the Washington Nationals, popping out as a pinch hitter in the seventh inning. He did not record his first hit until the last game of the season, on October 2 against the Atlanta Braves, when he doubled to left field in the bottom of the 10th off of Kyle Davies and then scored the winning run on a single by Juan Pierre.

=== Colorado Rockies ===
On January 6, 2006, he was traded to the Colorado Rockies for a player to be named later, but he missed the first part of the 2006 season after being placed on the 60-day disabled list with a broken toe. He played in 89 games that season with the Triple-A Colorado Springs Sky Sox, hitting .307, but did not get called up to the Majors.

=== Washington Nationals ===
Wilson signed as a free agent with the Washington Nationals on November 8, 2006.

In 2007, he appeared in 15 games for the Nationals before they placed him on waivers.

=== Tampa Bay Devil Rays ===
He was claimed by the Tampa Bay Devil Rays on May 10, 2007, and appeared in 90 games for them during the season. On June 8, Wilson pitched a scoreless 8th inning in a relief pitching appearance against the Marlins in a 14–8 loss.

=== Pittsburgh Pirates ===
On December 3, 2007, Wilson was claimed off waivers by the Pittsburgh Pirates. He was subsequently assigned to the Triple-A Indianapolis Indians, where he hit .276 in 97 games.

=== Boston Red Sox ===
In August 2008, Wilson was acquired by the Boston Red Sox and assigned to their Triple-A affiliate, the Pawtucket Red Sox. Wilson's acquisition by the Sox completed a three team deal which sent Manny Ramirez to the Los Angeles Dodgers from the Red Sox, Jason Bay to the Red Sox from the Pirates and infielder Andy LaRoche, and pitcher Bryan Morris from the Dodgers, and outfielder Brandon Moss and pitcher Craig Hansen from the Red Sox to the Pirates.

=== Arizona Diamondbacks ===
In December 2008, Wilson signed with the Arizona Diamondbacks. While on the Diamondbacks he helped turn a triple play against the Los Angeles Dodgers and was once again used as a relief pitcher, throwing a 90 mph fastball.

=== San Diego Padres ===
Wilson was designated for assignment on May 14 by the Diamondbacks and was picked up by the San Diego Padres on waivers on May 15.

On June 7, 2009, he pitched for the Padres against the Diamondbacks in the 18th inning of an extra inning game. He allowed a three-run, opposite field, game-winning home run to Mark Reynolds on an 88-MPH, cut fastball. He was the losing pitcher in a 9-6 Diamondbacks win. It was the second pitching appearance of the season for Wilson, who also pitched a scoreless 9th inning for the Diamondbacks against the Cincinnati Reds on May 11.

=== Seattle Mariners ===
On June 19, 2009, Wilson was claimed off waivers by the Seattle Mariners. While with the Seattle Mariners, he was affectionately nicknamed "The Paperboy" by Ken Griffey Jr. With the Mariners in '09 he hit .250 with eight doubles, one triple, three home runs and 10 RBI in 45 games giving him a combined average of .219 with 42 hits in 72 games between Arizona, San Diego and Seattle.

On December 10, 2009, Wilson re-signed with the Mariners. On December 10, 2010, Wilson re-signed with the Mariners to the tune of $725,000. On March 28, 2011, the Mariners released Wilson.

=== Arizona Diamondbacks (second stint) ===
On March 31, 2011, Wilson reportedly agreed to a minor league contract to return to the Diamondbacks. Wilson had his contract purchased by Arizona on April 25. He was designated for assignment on May 23.

=== Milwaukee Brewers ===
Wilson was claimed off waivers by the Milwaukee Brewers on May 25, 2011. In only his second appearance for the Brewers, Wilson hit a pinch hit home run. Only a week later he hit his 2nd home run, which was a go-ahead homer in extra innings against the Marlins. While with the Brewers, Wilson turned the second triple play of his career.

=== Atlanta Braves ===
Wilson signed a contract with the Atlanta Braves on November 22, 2011 but suffered a setback injury during spring training and never made it to the big leagues with the club.

=== Arizona Diamondbacks (third stint) ===
Wilson returned to the Diamondbacks for the third time in 2013 and made the big league roster out of spring training. He was designated for assignment on June 21, 2013.

=== Texas Rangers ===
Wilson signed a minor league deal with the Texas Rangers on December 12, 2013. He was designated for assignment on May 8, 2014. Wilson elected free agency in October 2014.

=== Detroit Tigers ===
On January 12, 2015, the Detroit Tigers signed Wilson to a minor league contract. On June 2, Wilson was called up by the Tigers from the Triple-A Toledo Mud Hens. On June 20, Wilson made the fourth pitching appearance of his career against the New York Yankees, giving up a solo home run to Chris Young before pitching the rest of the eighth inning. He was designated for assignment by the Tigers on July 7. Wilson cleared waivers and was sent outright to Triple-A Toledo on July 8. Wilson batted .252 with three home runs, 30 RBI, and 10 stolen bases for the Mud Hens. He was called up by the Tigers on September 8, as a September call-up.

=== York Revolution ===
On April 8, 2016, Wilson signed with the York Revolution of the Atlantic League of Professional Baseball. Wilson played in 120 games for the Revolution in 2016, posting a .255 batting average and 28 doubles.

=== Texas Rangers (second stint) ===
On April 18, 2017, Wilson was signed by the Texas Rangers to a minor league contract.

=== Cleveland Indians ===
On June 1, 2017, Wilson was traded to the Cleveland Indians in exchange for cash considerations. Playing in 54 games for the Triple–A Columbus Clippers, Wilson batted .207/.291/.303 with two home runs and nine RBI. He elected free agency following the season on November 6.

== Post-playing career ==
On January 7, 2019, Wilson was named to the scouting staff for the Detroit Tigers.
