= Jesús Javier Corpas Mauleón =

Spanish writer

Jesús Javier Corpas Mauleón is a Spanish writer born in Estella, Navarre, Spain. Author of numerous works published in the Spanish journals Historia Militar, Serga, Medioevo, and Calle Mayor, since August 2013 he has been a member of the scientific board of the prestigious Hispanic-American journal La Razón Histórica.

He is the author of the following books:

- Guerreros: Historias de mil años ("Warriors: Stories from One Thousand Years")
- La quinta carta ("The Fifth Letter")
- Los espartanos australes ("The Southern Spartans")
- Por montes y valles ("Over Hill and Dale")

He has appeared on various television and radio programs, moderated panel discussions, given conferences. He has been judge for the Festival of San Fermín awards. In recognition of his body of work, which includes novels, stories, and essays, he been made a Knight of Santiago and received the Cross of Honor of the European Defense Forces.
