= Ty Van Burkleo =

American baseball player & coach (born 1963)

- First baseman / Hitting coach
- Born: October 7, 1963 (age 63); Oakland, California, U.S.
- Batted: Left Threw: Left

Professional debut
- NPB: 1988, for the Seibu Lions
- MLB: July 28, 1993, for the California Angels

Last appearance
- NPB: 1991, for the Hiroshima Toyo Carp
- MLB: July 30, 1994, for the Colorado Rockies

NPB statistics
- Batting average: .239
- Hits: 157
- Home runs: 55

MLB statistics
- Batting average: .132
- Hits: 5
- Home runs: 1
- Stats at Baseball Reference

Teams
- As player: Seibu Lions (1988–1990); Hiroshima Toyo Carp (1991); California Angels (1993); Colorado Rockies (1994); As coach: Oakland Athletics (2007–2008); Seattle Mariners (2009–2010); Houston Astros (2012); Cleveland Indians (2013–2021)

Career highlights and awards
- 1988 Japan Series champion

Tyler Lee Van Burkleo (born October 7, 1963) is an American former bench coach for the Seattle Mariners, hitting coach for the Cleveland Indians, and a former first baseman in Major League Baseball (MLB). He played for two different major league teams in his career: the California Angels (1993) and Colorado Rockies (1994). He also played for two teams in Japan: the Seibu Lions (1988–1990) and the Hiroshima Toyo Carp (1991) with his registered name "Burkleo". At 24, he was player of the year with the Seibu Lions, hitting 38 home runs and driving in 90 runs for the 1988 Japan Champions.

== Biography ==
Van Burkleo attended Canoga Park High School and Chatsworth High School. He signed a minor league contract for $30,000 with the Milwaukee Brewers in 1981. He was released in 1984 and signed a contract with the Angels' minor league system. He was blocked by Wally Joyner for most of his first stint with the Angels. Van Burkleo's Angels contract was bought by the Seibu Lions of Nippon Professional Baseball in 1987. He was traded to the Hiroshima Toyo Carp in 1991 for cash considerations. Upon returning to the United States for the 1992 season, he signed with the Angels again, then played for the Rockies for two seasons, and in 1996 returned to the Angels for his last playing season.

In 1997, he began his coaching career with the High Desert Mavericks, an Arizona Diamondbacks affiliate. In 2001, he found himself working for the Angels again, as the minor league hitting coordinator. He left the Angels at the end of the 2006 season. For the 2007–2008 seasons, Van Burkleo was the hitting coach for the Oakland Athletics. In 2009, he was signed by the Mariners to be the bench coach to manager Don Wakamatsu. The following year, he was hired by the Astros to be the minor league hitting coordinator. On August 19, 2012, Van Burkleo was named the interim hitting coach for the Houston Astros. He was named hitting coach of the Cleveland Indians on October 31, 2012, beginning with the 2013 season.

On August 7, 2020, Van Burkleo announced he was opting out of the remainder of the 2020 season due to the COVID-19 pandemic. On October 6, 2021, the Indians announced Van Burkleo would not return as hitting coach for the 2022 season.

== Personal life ==
He is married to Chris and has five children.
