= Sean White (baseball) =

American baseball player (born 1981)

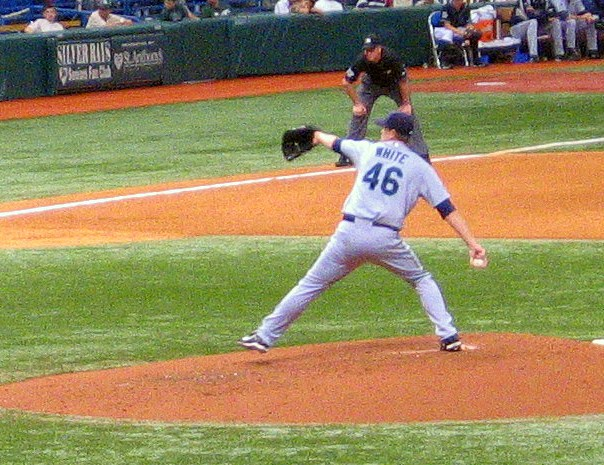
- White with the Seattle Mariners
- Pitcher
- Born: April 25, 1981 (age 45); Pullman, Washington, U.S.
- Batted: Right Threw: Right

MLB debut
- April 4, 2007, for the Seattle Mariners

Last MLB appearance
- September 1, 2010, for the Seattle Mariners

MLB statistics
- Win–loss record: 4–4
- Earned run average: 4.16
- Strikeouts: 59
- Stats at Baseball Reference

Teams
- Seattle Mariners (2007, 2009–2010)

Sean Thomas White (born April 25, 1981) is an American former Major League Baseball (MLB) right-handed relief pitcher who played for the Seattle Mariners between 2007 and 2010.

== Amateur career ==
A native of Pullman, Washington, White attended Mercer Island High School in Mercer Island, Washington and the University of Washington. He played college baseball for the Huskies from 2000–2003 and was an All-Pac-10 honorable mention in 2002 and 2003. In 2001, he played collegiate summer baseball with the Orleans Cardinals of the Cape Cod Baseball League, and returned to the league in 2002 to play for the Brewster Whitecaps. White was selected by the Atlanta Braves in 8th Round (247th overall) of 2003 MLB draft.

== Professional career ==
=== Atlanta Braves ===
White was named the Danville Braves Pitcher of the Month for August, going 3–0 with a 0.67 ERA. He Ranked third on the team with 51.1 innings pitched and only allowed one home run in all of 2003.

He held opponents to a .164 batting average in April of 2004. On two occasions he threw a season-high 7.0 innings of shutout ball. White finished the season 6–6 with a 3.60 ERA in 16 games.

In 2005 he spent the season with the Single-A Myrtle Beach Pelicans and the Double-A Mississippi Braves. He finished fourth in the organization with 11 wins, ranked eighth with a 3.85 ERA and 10th with 98 strikeouts. He was 9–3 through 18 appearances with Myrtle Beach, including 4–0 at home until he made his Double-A debut on July 18, throwing 6.0 shutout innings in a 1–0. He was named Myrtle Beach's June Pitcher of the Month by the organization going 3–2 with a 3.63 ERA in 34.2 innings pitched.

He split the season with the Double-A Braves and the Gulf Coast Braves. He went a combined 5–6 with a 4.12 ERA.

=== Seattle Mariners ===
White made his Major League Debut on April 4, 2007 against the Oakland Athletics. He was one of 6 players to make his Major League debut with Seattle in 2007, making 15 appearances, all in relief. He went 1–1 with a 5.60 ERA. White limited opposing batters to a .261 batting average.

=== Colorado Rockies ===
On January 11, 2011, White signed a minor league deal with the Colorado Rockies. He played for the Colorado Springs Sky Sox.

=== Boston Red Sox ===
On February 11, 2012, White signed a minor league contract with the Boston Red Sox but was released at the end of spring training.

=== Los Angeles Angels of Anaheim ===
On May 7, 2012, White signed a minor league contract with the Los Angeles Angels of Anaheim and appeared in 29 games with the AAA Salt Lake Bees.

=== Los Angeles Dodgers ===
On February 18, 2013, he signed a minor league contract with the Los Angeles Dodgers and was assigned to the AAA Albuquerque Isotopes. He appeared in 34 games (7 starts) and was 6–6 with a 3.51 ERA.
