= Matt Kemp =

American baseball player (born 1984)

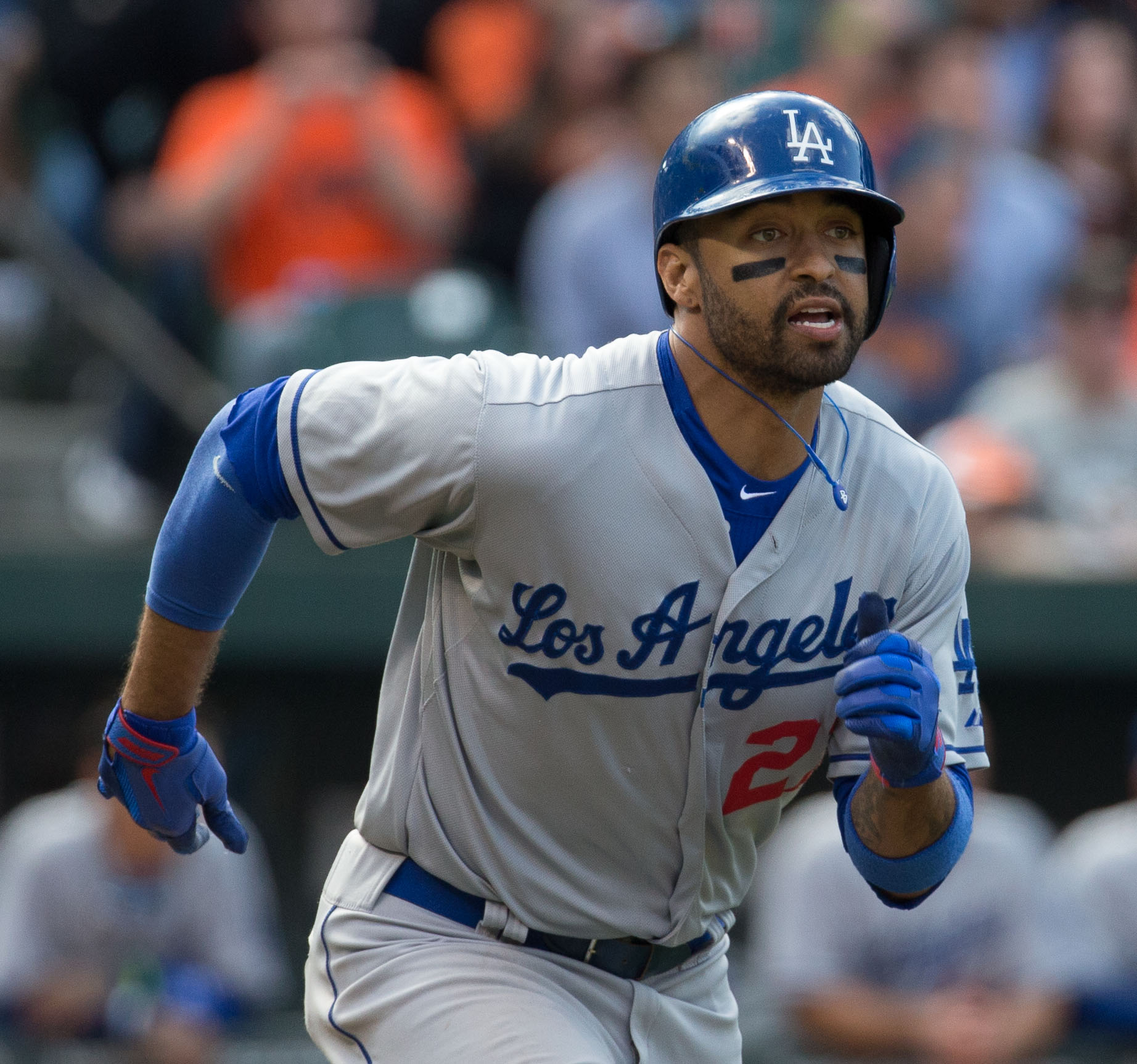
- Kemp with the Los Angeles Dodgers in 2013
- Outfielder
- Born: September 23, 1984 (age 42); Midwest City, Oklahoma, U.S.
- Batted: Right Threw: Right

MLB debut
- May 28, 2006, for the Los Angeles Dodgers

Last MLB appearance
- September 25, 2020, for the Colorado Rockies

MLB statistics
- Batting average: .284
- Home runs: 287
- Runs batted in: 1,031
- Stats at Baseball Reference

Teams
- Los Angeles Dodgers (2006–2014); San Diego Padres (2015–2016); Atlanta Braves (2016–2017); Los Angeles Dodgers (2018); Cincinnati Reds (2019); Colorado Rockies (2020)

Career highlights and awards
- 3× All-Star (2011, 2012, 2018); 2× Gold Glove Award (2009, 2011); 2× Silver Slugger Award (2009, 2011); NL Hank Aaron Award (2011); NL home run leader (2011); NL RBI leader (2011)

Matthew Ryan Kemp (born September 23, 1984) is an American former professional baseball outfielder. He began his professional career in the Los Angeles Dodgers organization in 2003, and played in Major League Baseball (MLB) with the Dodgers from 2006 until 2014, the San Diego Padres in 2015 and 2016 and the Atlanta Braves in 2016 and 2017 before returning to the Dodgers for the 2018 season, and briefly playing for the Cincinnati Reds in 2019 and Colorado Rockies in 2020. He was named to three All-Star teams and won two Gold Glove Awards (2009 and 2011) and two Silver Slugger Awards (2009 and 2011).

The Dodgers selected Kemp in the sixth round of the 2003 MLB draft. After four seasons in the minor leagues, he made his major league debut in 2006. He did not become a full-time player until 2008, when he took over as the starting center fielder for the Dodgers. In 2011, Kemp led the National League in runs scored (115), total bases (353), OPS+ (171), WAR (7.8), home runs (39), and runs batted in (126). Additionally, he became the first player to finish in the top two in both home runs and steals since Hank Aaron in 1963.

== Early life ==
Kemp was born in Midwest City, Oklahoma, the son of Carl Kemp and Judy Henderson, who never married. He was raised in Oklahoma by his mother, a registered nurse, and grandmother. When he was 13, his mother had another son, Tyler, who was born prematurely and died at age one.

Kemp attended Midwest City High School, where he was a standout in basketball and baseball. He was teammates with Shelden Williams on the varsity basketball team that won the state title two years in a row, and the team was ranked third in the nation at one point. Kemp himself was an All-City selection, and averaged 20 points a game. Kemp received a scholarship offer to play college basketball for the Oklahoma Sooners.

Kemp, along with Williams and three other teammates, were accused of raping a 19-year-old woman at the time of a high school all-star basketball tournament on January 20, 2002, at the Columbus, Ohio Hyatt hotel. The players were suspended from the team during the investigation. However, the woman did not press charges, and the district attorney opted to not pursue the matter due to a lack of evidence.

== Professional career ==
=== Draft and minor leagues ===
The Los Angeles Dodgers selected Kemp in the sixth round of the 2003 MLB draft. He signed with the team on June 5, 2003, for a $130,000 signing bonus.

Kemp started his professional career for the Gulf Coast Dodgers in 2003 and followed that up with stints with the Columbus Catfish in 2004 and the Vero Beach Dodgers in 2004–05. At Columbus and Vero Beach, Kemp improved his power numbers. After hitting just a single home run in 43 games, Kemp became more of a power hitter. In 2004 with Columbus, he belted 18 home runs to go along with 27 doubles in 122 games, and in 2005, he belted 27 home runs to go along with 21 doubles in 109 games. He was selected to the Florida State League All-Star team in 2005, and set Vero Beach franchise records for home runs (27) and slugging percentage (.569).

=== Los Angeles Dodgers (2006–2014) ===
==== 2006: rookie year ====
Kemp began 2006 with the AA Jacksonville Suns, where he hit .327 with seven homers, 34 runs batted in (RBIs) and 11 steals, prompting a promotion to the major league squad. His promotion was spurred by an effort to provide regular rest for aging center fielder Kenny Lofton and the often injured right field All-Star J. D. Drew.

Kemp made his major league debut with the Los Angeles Dodgers on May 28, 2006, against the Washington Nationals. He got his first career major league hit that same game, a single off Jon Rauch. He hit his first Major League homer on June 1 in his second Dodger Stadium at-bat off the Philadelphia Phillies' Gavin Floyd. Kemp homered in three straight games from June 1–3 against the Phillies and homered twice on June 11 off Colorado Rockies starter Aaron Cook. He also became the first Dodger and fifth major league player to hit four homers in his first 10 days with the team.

After his fast start, Kemp slumped and hit only .234 with no homers from June 14 through July 13, when he was reassigned to the AAA Las Vegas 51s. He returned to the team when rosters expanded on September 1. In his second stint in the Majors, Kemp struggled. He batted just .156 with a .182 on-base percentage and a .250 slugging percentage in September and October combined. By season's end, Kemp showed some power, with seven home runs and speed, with six stolen bases but he struggled with his batting average and getting on base. He batted just .253 and posted an on-base percentage of .289.

==== 2007 ====
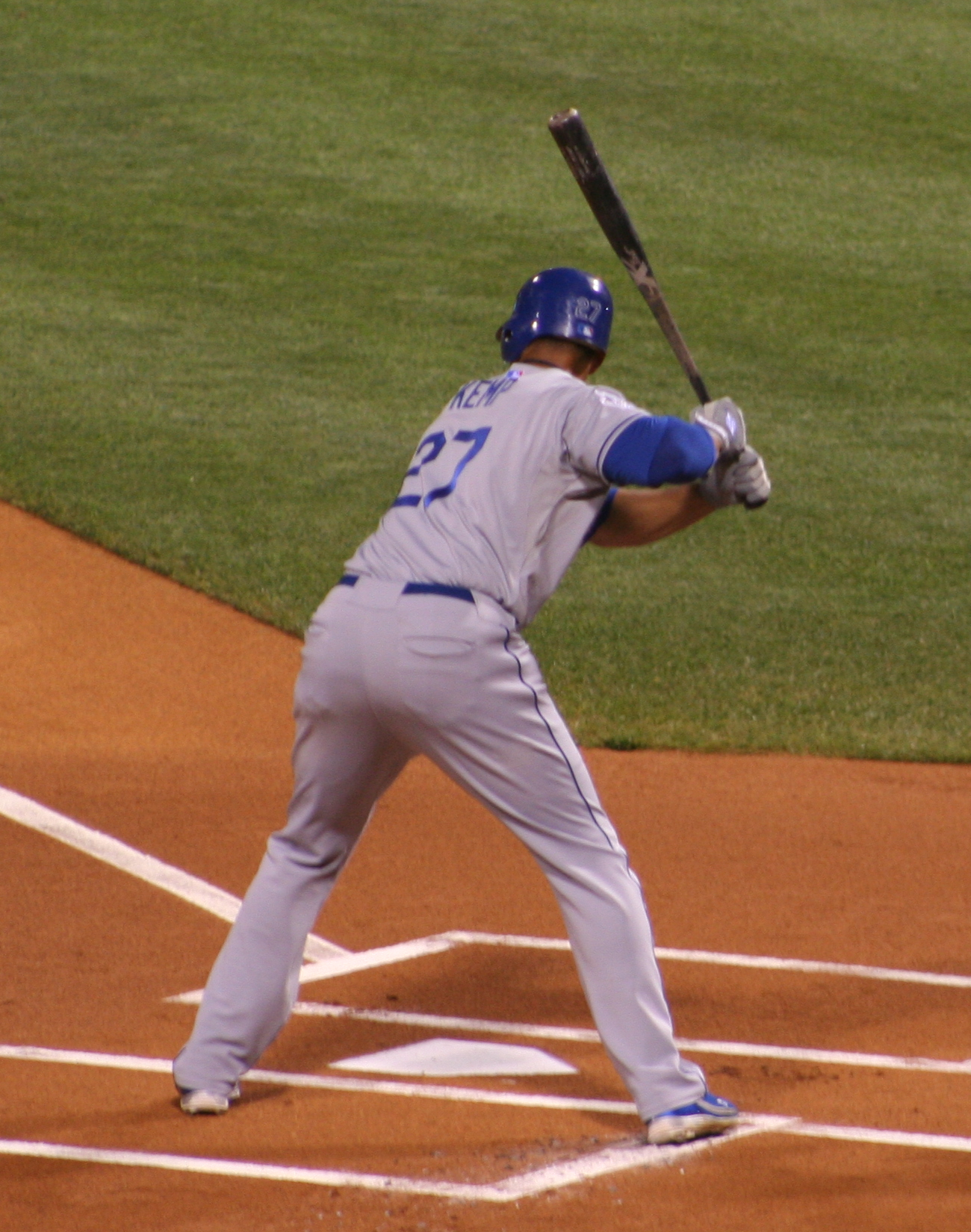
Kemp at the plate in 2008

Kemp started the 2007 season on the major league roster but lost his place after suffering a shoulder injury while running into the outfield fence at Dodger Stadium. Upon his return from the injury, he was optioned back to Las Vegas. Returning to Triple-A and playing for the Las Vegas 51s, Kemp played well in his short stint. In just 39 games, he had a .329 batting average, .374 on-base percentage, and a .540 slugging percentage. He hit four home runs, drove in 20 runs, and stole nine bases out of 11 attempts. He was recalled to the Dodgers on June 8. He enjoyed an outstanding sophomore campaign with the bat batting .342, clubbing 10 home runs, and driving in 42 runs.

==== 2008 ====
Kemp became the starting right fielder in 2008. He hit his first career grand slam, off Mark Redman, on April 26 against the Colorado Rockies. Kemp drove in the first run of the game for the Dodgers, a sacrifice fly in the first inning that scored Juan Pierre. After driving in 11 runs and stealing six bases. He was named "National League Player of the Week" for the week of April 28 – May 4.

After a knee injury to Andruw Jones, Kemp became the Dodgers' regular center fielder, moving over from right field. His best month of the season was in July, in which he had a .324 batting average, .402 on-base percentage, .537 slugging percentage to go along with five home runs, 14 RBIs, and 10 stolen bases. That month also sparked Kemp's career high 19-game hitting streak, which lasted from July 9 through August 1, ending with a hitless performance on August 2. However, Kemp got back on track the next night by having a three-hit game to go along with a home run. He finished the season with a .290 average, 18 homers and 76 RBI. Kemp was also second on the team in stolen bases with 35. In addition, he set a Dodgers record with 153 strikeouts in a season. In his first career postseason game, Kemp went 1 for 4 with a double. However, he batted just .154 in the 2008 National League Division Series (NLDS) against the Chicago Cubs. Both of his hits went for doubles. In the 2008 National League Championship Series (NLCS), against the Philadelphia Phillies, Kemp did better, batting .333 as the Dodgers lost the series to the eventual World Series champions.

==== 2009 ====
Kemp had his first career walk-off hit on June 16 against the Oakland A's. On September 24, he became the first player in Dodger history to hit at least .295, with 25 home runs, 100 RBIs, and 30 steals in one season. He finished the year with .297, 26 home runs, 101 RBI, and 34 steals (third in the NL). His 10 RBIs in extra innings were the most that a player has driven in extra innings since 1991 and he became the first player to reach double-digits in this category since 1982.

Kemp hit his first career post-season home run on October 7 in his first at-bat of the 2009 NLDS against the St. Louis Cardinals. After the season, Kemp was selected as a recipient of both the Gold Glove Award and the Silver Slugger Award. He also tied a Dodger record with three grand slams in one season.

==== 2010 ====
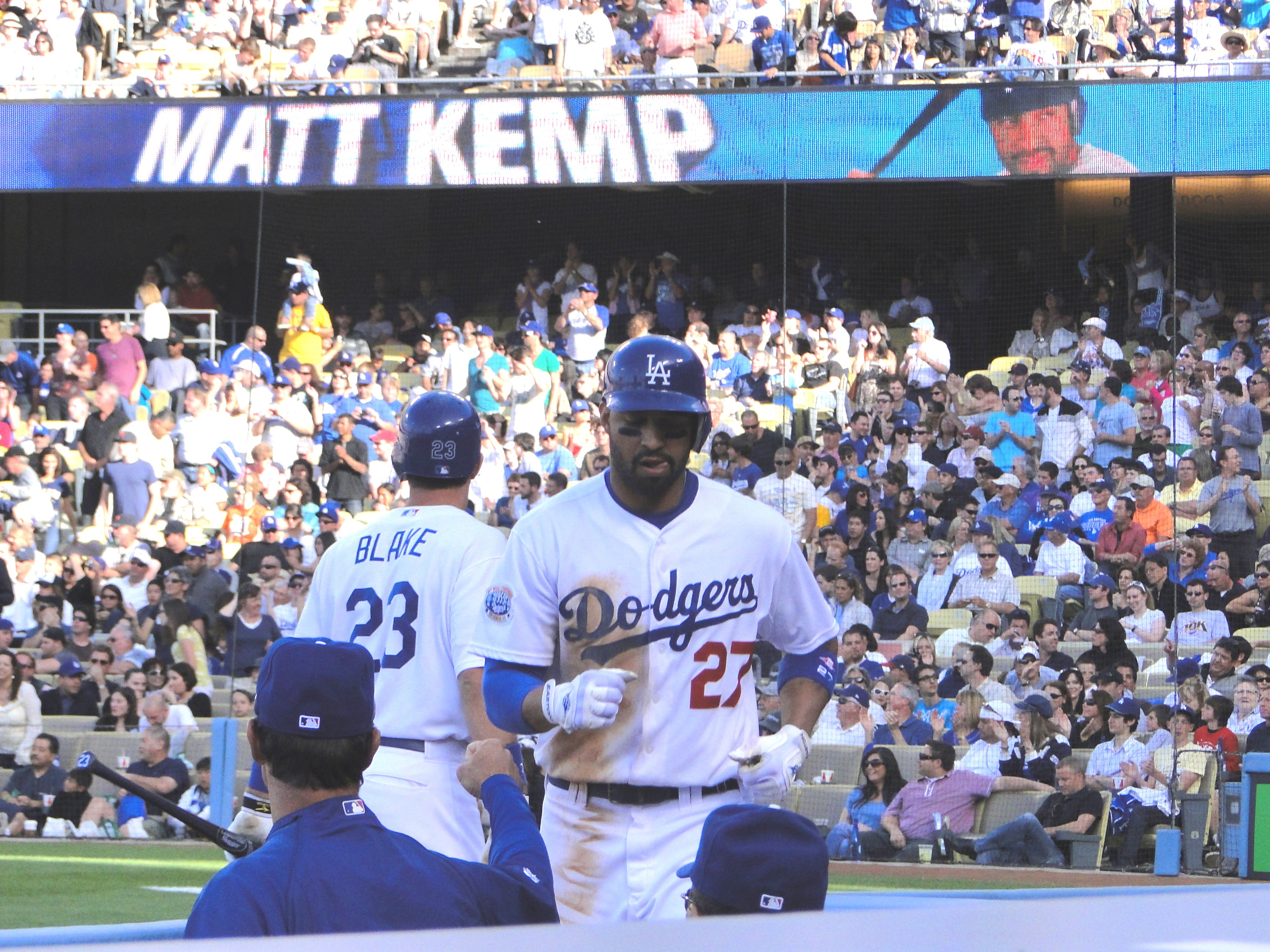
Kemp returns to the dugout after hitting a home run on May 22, 2010

Kemp began the 2010 season in excellent fashion, hitting seven home runs in the month of April, including four in four days from April 13–16. On June 1, Kemp hit his first career walk-off home run against the Arizona Diamondbacks off of relief pitcher J. C. Gutiérrez, giving the Dodgers the only run of the game. Kemp described his first career walk-off home run as "a great feeling". However, he slumped badly in the second half of the season and finished with a .249 batting average, 28 home runs, 89 RBIs, and 19 steals while playing in all 162 games for the first time in his career. He also broke his own single-season Dodger record for strikeouts, with 170.

Kemp was the subject of some criticism in 2010 from General Manager Ned Colletti, who called him out publicly early in the season for poor baserunning. Kemp had several embarrassing gaffes on the base paths during the season, and was caught stealing 15 times. With runners in scoring position, he hit seven home runs and drove in 61 runs in 160 at bats. However, he struck out 49 times and batted just .225 in that spot. Against right-handed pitching, he batted just .233 with a .299 on-base percentage, to go along with 22 home runs and 69 RBIs, as opposed to a .295 average against left-handed pitchers.

Kemp hit home runs in five straight games to end the season, the first major league player to accomplish that feat and the first Dodger since Shawn Green in the 2001 season to hit homers in five consecutive games. The only other Dodgers to homer in five consecutive games are Roy Campanella (1950), Adrián González (2014–15), Joc Pederson (2015), Max Muncy (2019), and Shohei Ohtani (2025).

==== 2011 ====
After his much publicized problems on the base paths the previous season, Kemp arrived at spring training early to work with new Dodger coach Davey Lopes on his base running. Kemp announced his intention to steal 40 bases this season and Lopes hoped they would be high percentage steals. At the end of the season, Kemp had the 40 steals and was only caught 11 times, a significant improvement in percentage from the previous year, and his work with Lopes was credited for much of the improvement.

On April 17, Kemp hit his second career walk-off home run, doing it in the ninth inning off of St. Louis Cardinals closer Ryan Franklin, on a 2–2 count that gave the Dodgers a 2–1 victory." In a game against the Atlanta Braves five days later, Kemp hit his second walk-off home run of the season, this time in the 12th inning, off Braves pitcher Cristhian Martínez.

After being one of the league leaders in home runs, stolen bases, RBIs, and batting average during the first half of the season, Kemp was voted as a starter for the National League squad in the 2011 Major League Baseball All-Star Game in Arizona. He also accepted an invitation to participate in the Home Run Derby at the All-Star Game.

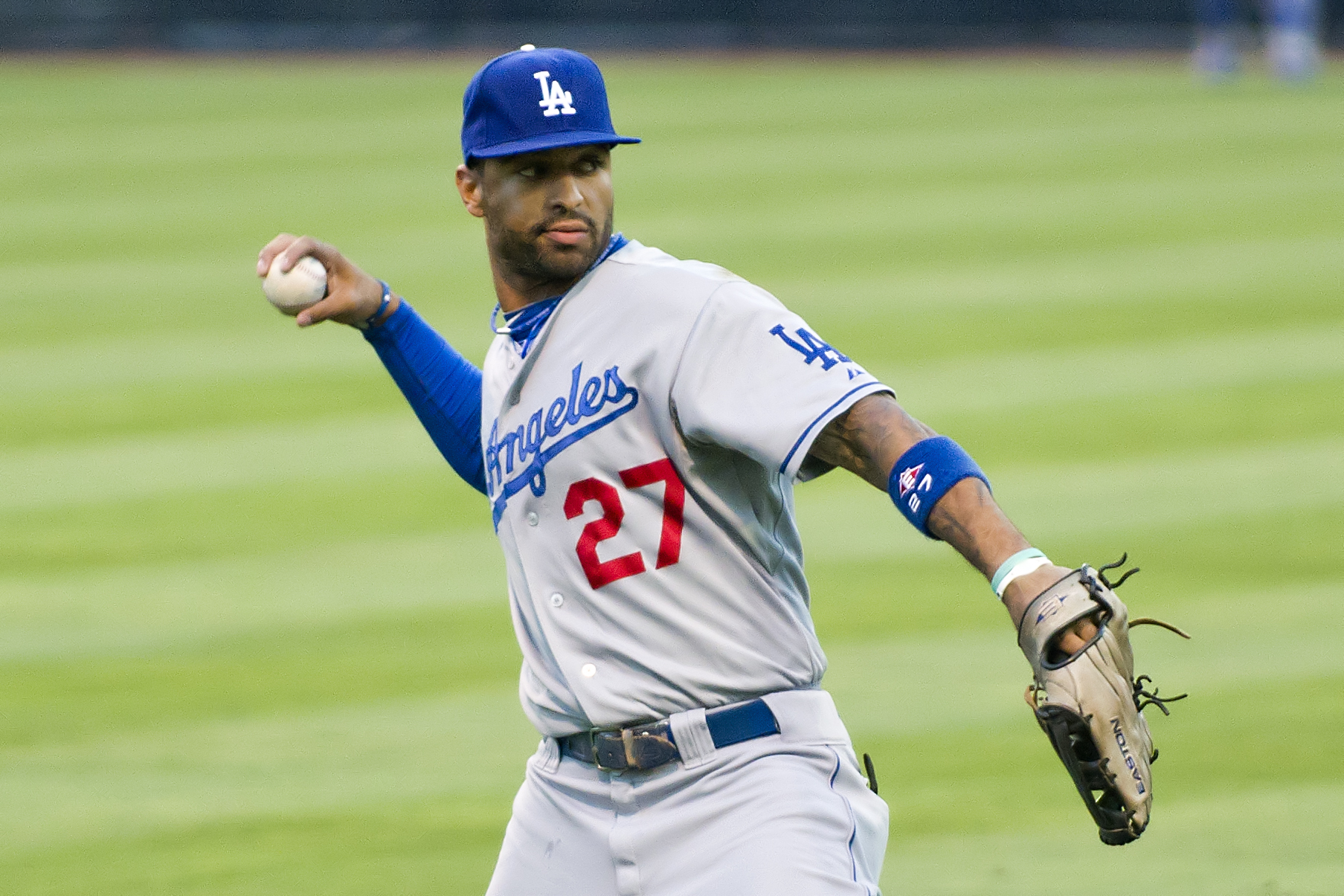
Kemp in August 2011

The day before the All-Star Game, Giants' manager and 2011 NL All-Star Manager, Bruce Bochy, announced his decision to bat Kemp third in the line up. Explaining his decision, Bochy said about Kemp, "He's a guy with speed, power, a guy that can beat you with a base hit or a long ball. He's what you call a complete player – tremendous defender, but more so in the 3-hole, he can do so many things for you. He's so dangerous." Kemp, with a single and a walk, became the first Dodger to reach base twice in an All-Star Game since Mike Piazza in 1996.

Kemp hit his 30th home run of the season on August 26, and in the process became the second Dodger player of all time to hit at least 30 homers and steal at least 30 bases in the same season (30–30 club). The only other one was Raúl Mondesí in the 1997 and 1999 seasons. He picked up his 40th stolen base on September 17, becoming the 18th Major Leaguer and first Dodger in history to hit at least 30 homers and steal at least 40 bases. Kemp also scored his 100th run of the season, making him just the 10th L.A. Dodger to score 100 runs and have 100 RBIs in a season, and the first since Jeff Kent in 2005. He hit his 35th home run on September 21, making him the 14th Major Leaguer (and first since Alfonso Soriano in 2006) to hit at least 35 home runs and steal at least 35 bases in a season.

On September 20, the Dodgers announced Kemp was selected by his teammates as the recipient of the 2011 Roy Campanella Award, which is given annually to the Dodger player who best exemplifies the spirit and leadership of the late Roy Campanella. He also won the NL Player of the Week Award for the week of September 19–25, 2011 after he hit .423 (11 for 26) with nine runs scored and three home runs during that week.

Kemp wound up hitting 39 home runs in 2011 with 126 RBIs, leading the league in both categories, the first Dodger to do so since Dolph Camilli in the 1941 season. He also led the league in runs scored (115), total bases (353), OPS+ (171), and WAR (10.0). He finished second in slugging percentage (.586), OPS (.986), extra base hits (76), and stolen bases (40, tied), and third in batting average (.324) and outfield assists (11). He also led the National League in power-speed number (39.5). Kemp also extended his games played streak to 364 games, as he played in every game of the season. He was the first player to finish in the top two in both home runs and steals since Hank Aaron in the 1963 season.

After struggling to hit with runners in scoring position the previous year, Kemp bounced back and hit well with runners in scoring position. In 155 at-bats with runners in scoring position, he hit .335 (52-for-155) with 13 home runs and 87 RBIs. And against right-handers, he batted .319 (150-for-470) with 28 home runs and 94 RBIs.

Kemp was selected for a number of post-season awards, including the Baseball America Major League Player of the Year, the Hank Aaron Award for the top hitter in the National League (the first Dodger player to ever win the award) the Gold Glove Award and the Silver Slugger Award. On October 27, he was named to the 2011 Sporting News National League All-Star team.

On November 22, Kemp came in second to Ryan Braun in the voting for the National League Most Valuable Player Award. Later, it was revealed that Braun had tested positive for elevated testosterone and MLB attempted to suspend him, but lost on appeal. A survey of baseball writers revealed that if the MVP vote was retaken, with knowledge of Braun's positive test, then Kemp would have won. Braun was eventually suspended as part of the Biogenesis scandal. Kemp publicly stated that he believed Braun should be stripped of his MVP Award from that season.

After the season, Kemp signed a franchise record eight-year, $160 million contract extension. After signing his extension, he predicted that he would become the first player in history to have a 50–50 season.

==== 2012 ====
Kemp started the 2012 season by winning the National League Player of the Week award for the opening weekend. He hit two home runs and drove in eight RBIs during the opening series against the San Diego Padres. Kemp was also the first Dodger to record three consecutive multi-hit games to start the season since Adrián Beltré did it in the 2000 season. This was the third time he had won the award, and second consecutive, as he had won it the final week of 2011 as well. On April 10, Kemp became the first LA Dodger to have an RBI in the first five games of the season since J. D. Drew in the 2006 season and, counting the end of the previous season, he had nine straight games with an RBI, tying Roy Campanella (1955 season) and Augie Galan (1944 season) for the Dodgers' franchise record. Kemp also won the Player of the Week award for the second week of the season, which, combined with winning the award in the last week of 2011, made him the only player to ever win three consecutive awards. He was also only the second player to win the award twice to begin the season, the other being Tony Armas for the 1981 Athletics. Kemp hit 12–22 with four HRs and a 1.182 slugging percentage, leading the club to its best 10-game start since 1981.

Kemp hit his 10th home run of the season on April 25, tying Gary Sheffield's club record for homers in April set in the 2000 season. He broke Sheffield's record with a walk-off homer against the Washington Nationals on April 28. Kemp was also named National League player of the month for April.

Kemp was placed on the disabled list on May 14 because of a hamstring injury, ending his streak of 399 consecutive games played, which was the longest in the majors at the time. After his DL stint, he promptly re-injured his hamstring two days later while running the bases, and returned to the DL. Despite missing about two months with injuries, Kemp was voted by the fans as a starter for the 2012 Major League Baseball All-Star Game. As he was still on the disabled list, Kemp did not play in the game but he did participate in the Home Run Derby for the second straight year, hitting one home run in the Derby. Kemp finally returned to the Dodgers lineup on July 13, after missing about two months with his hamstring injury.

Kemp's injury woes continued as he crashed into the outfield wall at Coors Field in Colorado on August 28, and injured both his knee and his shoulder. He continued to play despite the injuries. Kemp finished the season batting .303 with 23 home runs and 69 RBIs in 106 games. His nine stolen bases were his fewest since his first season.

After the season, Kemp underwent surgery on his sore shoulder to repair a torn labrum and some minor damage to his rotator cuff. He was told that he would not be able to swing a bat again until January.

==== 2013 ====
Kemp recorded his 1,000th career hit on May 12, 2013, against the Miami Marlins.

However, Kemp struggled out of the gate in 2013, subsequent to his shoulder surgery in the offseason. On May 27, Kemp went 0-for-5 with 4 strikeouts, and was booed heavily by the majority of the Dodgers crowd. Teammate Adrián González said that Kemp was "trying too hard for the team and the fans."

On May 29, Kemp injured his right hamstring in a game. He left during the seventh inning, and did not return to the game. Kemp was placed on the 15-day disabled list on May 30. He spent time rehabbing at Camelback Ranch, the Dodgers spring training home, and was close to returning when he suffered a setback on June 9. Kemp returned to the Dodgers on June 25, after missing 24 games. In that game, Kemp made a game-ending catch while reaching over his shoulder, robbing the Giants' Marco Scutaro of a hit.

He returned to the disabled list on July 8, after experiencing pain in his surgically repaired shoulder. He returned from the DL again on July 21 against the Washington Nationals, and was 3 for 4 with a home run and a double in the game.

However, he injured his ankle in a play at home plate in the ninth inning of the game. After initially expressing optimism that the injury was not serious, he again was placed on the 15-day DL on July 24. Reacting to criticism of his string of injuries, Kemp said: "I'm not made of glass."

Kemp's ankle injury took a lot longer to heal than had been expected, and the team reported that they hoped to get him back in September. However, when he finally began his minor league rehab assignment at Class-A Rancho Cucamonga in late August, he struggled at the plate and his return date was pushed back. He went hitless in five games, with seven strikeouts, and when the minor league season ended on September 2 he was moved to Camelback Ranch to continue his rehab rather than being activated.

A few days later, he experienced tightness in the same hamstring he had hurt earlier in the year, and the Dodgers shut him down indefinitely. He eventually rejoined the Dodgers lineup on September 17, and had four hits (including two doubles) in four at bats. He played regularly in an attempt to get his timing back before the playoffs.

However, he was a late scratch from a game on September 28 because of soreness in his ankle. An MRI the following day revealed major swelling in a weight-bearing bone in his ankle. Kemp was told that if he kept playing his ankle could break and leave him with chronic problems for the rest of his career. He was shut down, and the team announced he would not be available for the playoffs and would have surgery to repair the problem. Kemp suffered an articular talar injury requiring microfracture surgery to his talus bone.

He appeared in only 73 games in 2013, due to his various injuries. He hit .270 with 6 home runs and 33 RBIs, and a .395 slugging percentage.

With the Dodgers crowded outfield situation, Kemp was the subject of much trade speculation after the season. His agent, Dave Stewart, publicly stated that he expected Kemp to be traded during the off-season. However, Stewart later remarked that the team had assured him that it would not be making such a trade.

==== 2014 ====
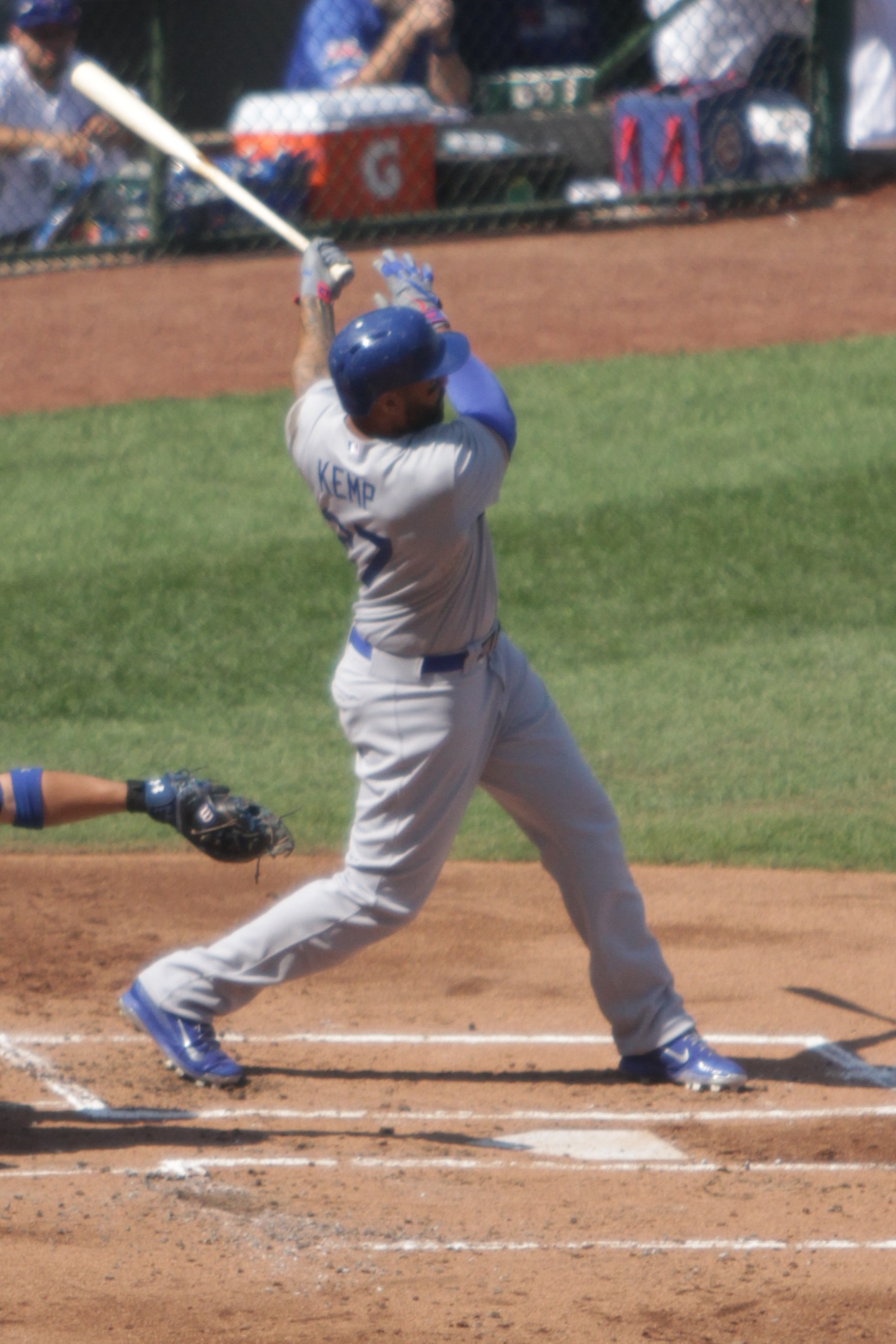
On September 19, 2014, Kemp homered on this swing in support of Clayton Kershaw's 20th victory.

Recovering from various injuries, Kemp sat out most of spring training and only started playing in minor league rehab games after the Dodgers left for their season-opening series in Australia. He began the season on the disabled list, and rejoined the Dodgers for their home opener in April.

Kemp struggled defensively in center field during the first couple of months of the season, a problem that came to a head after a particular bad series for him against the New York Mets in mid-May. Manager Don Mattingly was openly critical of his outfield play following the series. Immediately afterward, the Dodgers made Andre Ethier the starting center fielder, and informed Kemp that he would be moving to left field. However, he was kept out of the lineup for five straight games as he was learning the new position, and was vocally unhappy about it. After playing in left for several weeks, he was moved to right field, a position he had not played regularly since 2009. He was more comfortable in right which led to the Dodgers moving Yasiel Puig to center field. The last week of July, he hit five home runs in six games to win Player of the Week honors for the fifth time in his career. He also won Player of the Month for September, when he hit .322 with nine homers and 25 RBI. For the season, Kemp hit .287 with 25 homers and 89 RBI in 150 games. He was second among NL outfielders in errors, with seven.

=== San Diego Padres (2015–2016) ===
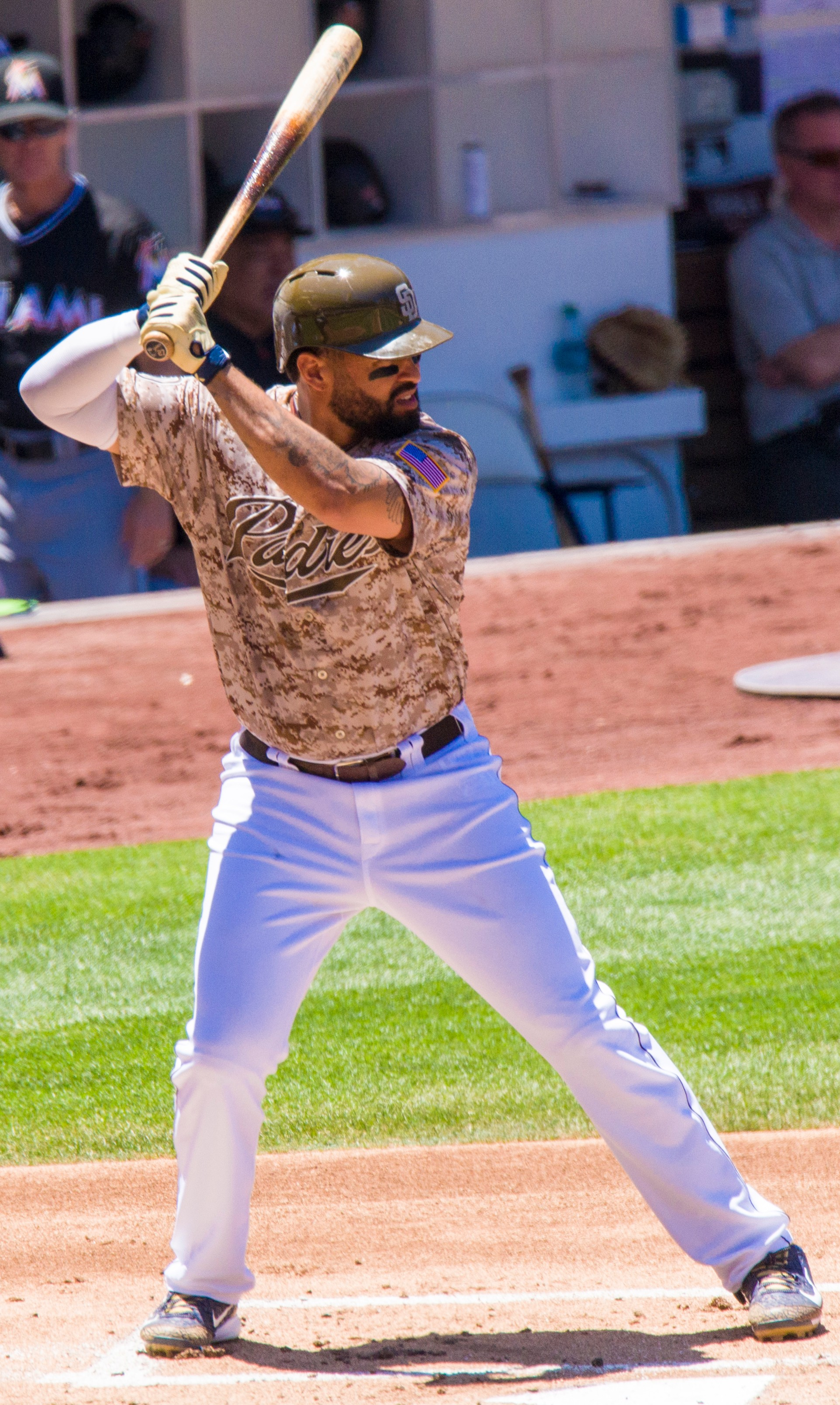
Kemp batting for the San Diego Padres in 2015

On December 11, 2014, he was traded to the San Diego Padres along with Tim Federowicz and $32 million in cash for Joe Wieland, Yasmani Grandal, and Zach Eflin. The trade was not finalized until December 18 due to the Padres expressing some concerns over a physical which revealed Kemp had severe arthritis in both hips. The Padres attempted to renegotiate the deal after the physical but the Dodgers refused, and the deal was consummated as originally conceived.

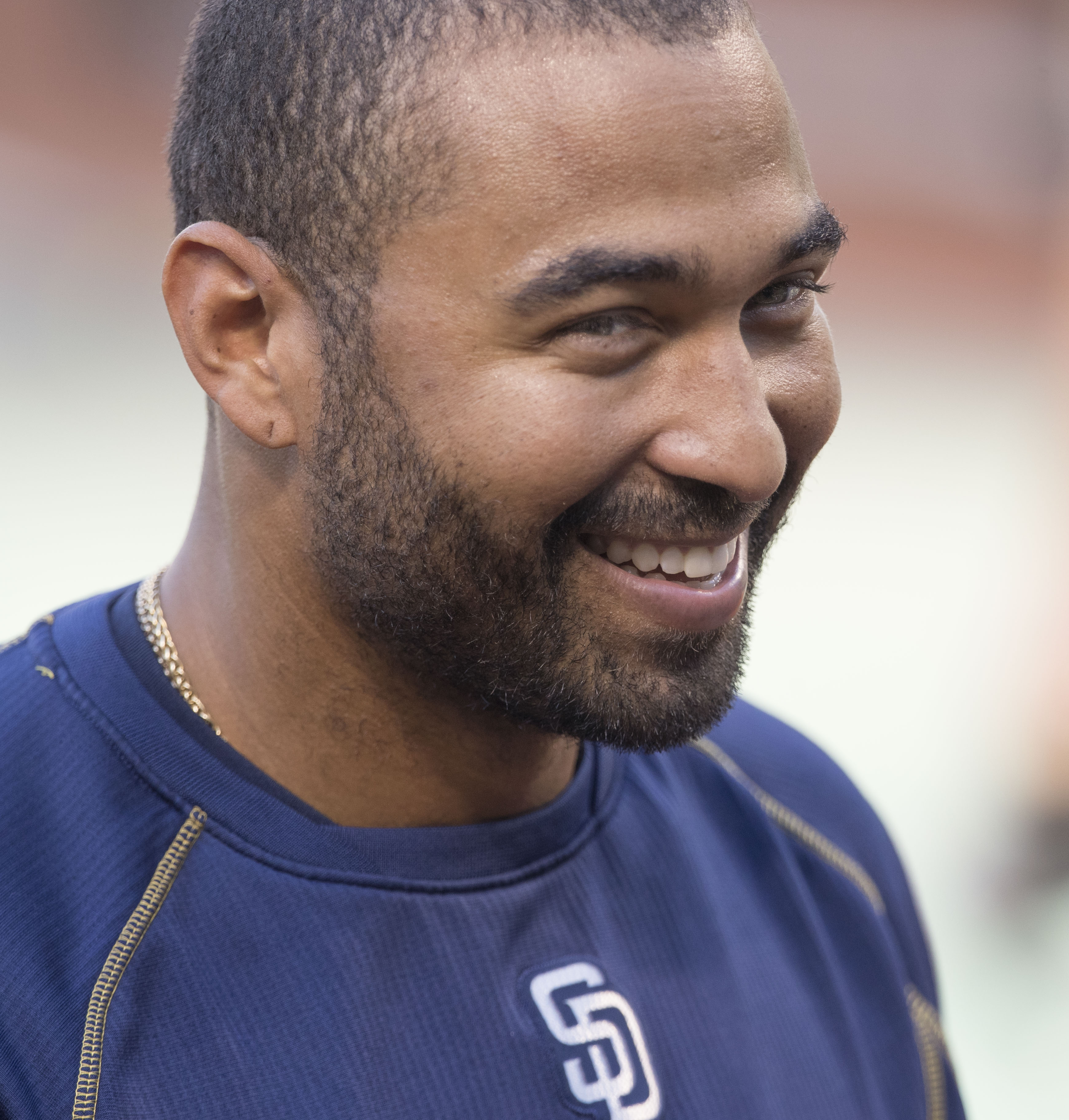
Kemp during his tenure with the San Diego Padres in 2016

Kemp played his first game with the Padres during opening day on April 6, 2015, against his old team, the Dodgers. During that game, Kemp drove in all three runs for the Padres, as the team lost to the Dodgers 6-3.

On August 14, 2015, on the road against the Colorado Rockies, Kemp became the first player in the Padres' 7,444-game history to hit for the cycle. In the first inning, he hit a two-run home run to center, followed by a single and a double. Kemp finished with a triple to center field in the top of the ninth inning, scoring Yangervis Solarte from first. He finished the night 4-for-5. In the 2015 season, he led NL outfielders in errors, with eight.

In 2016 for the Padres, Kemp batted .262/.285/.489.

=== Atlanta Braves (2016–2017) ===
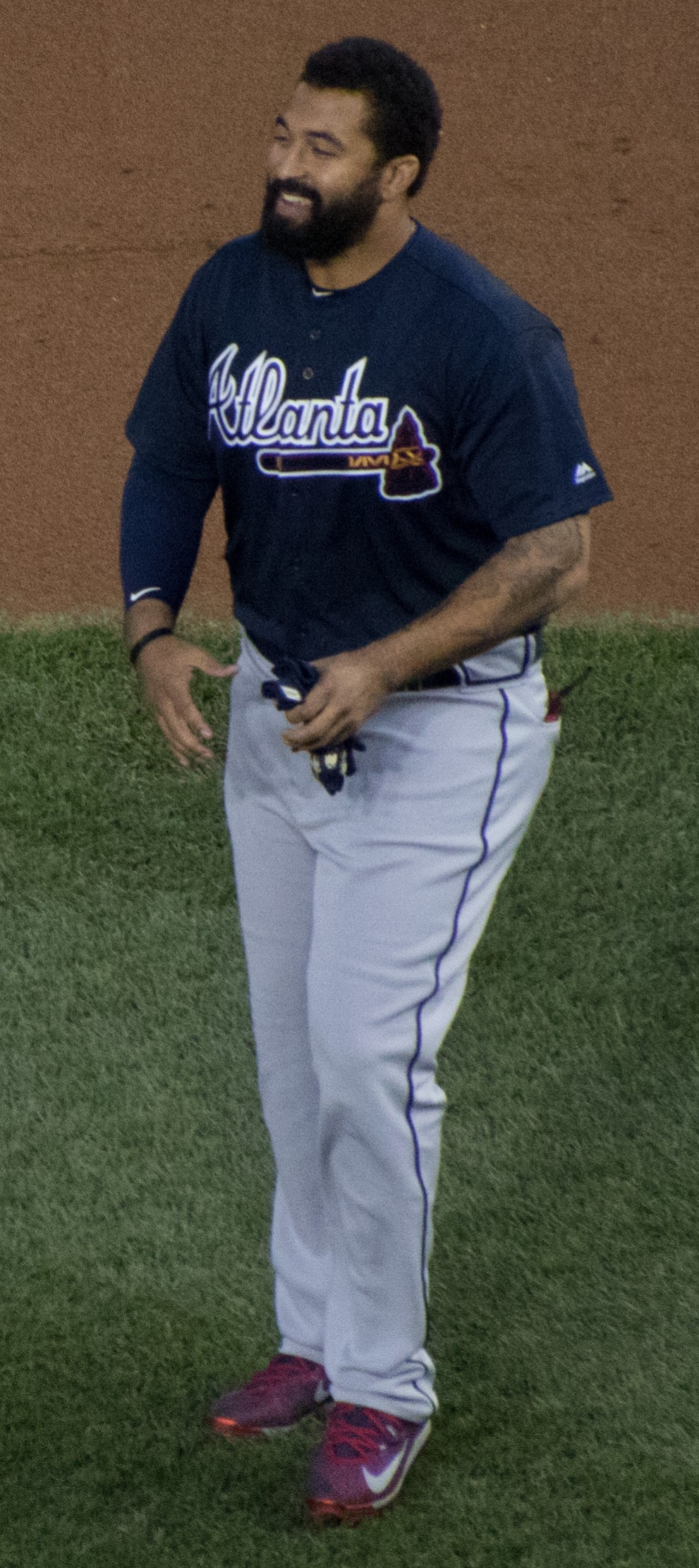
Kemp during his tenure with the Atlanta Braves in 2017

On July 30, 2016, the Padres traded Kemp with cash considerations to the Atlanta Braves in exchange for Héctor Olivera. The Braves moved Kemp to left field, a position he had started playing with the Dodgers in 2014. On September 16, in a game against the Washington Nationals, Kemp hit a double for the 1,500th hit of his career.

On April 11, 2017, Kemp was placed on the 10-day disabled list due to left hamstring tightness. On April 29, Kemp became the first Brave to have a three home run game since Mark Teixeira in 2008.

For the 2017 season, he batted .276/.318/.463, while leading the NL in double plays grounded into (with 25), and hitting 19 home runs but, for the first time in his major league career, not stealing any bases.

=== Second stint with the Dodgers (2018) ===
On December 16, 2017, the Braves traded Kemp to the Los Angeles Dodgers for Adrián González, Scott Kazmir, Brandon McCarthy, Charlie Culberson and cash considerations.

Batting .316 with 15 home runs and 58 RBIs, Kemp was voted by the fans to start the 2018 Major League Baseball All-Star Game, his third All-Star appearance and first since 2012. Kemp finished the year hitting .290 and 21 home runs

Kemp homered in his first career World Series at-bat, off Chris Sale in Game 1 of the 2018 World Series. The Dodgers lost the series to the Red Sox in five games.

=== Cincinnati Reds (2019) ===
On December 21, 2018, the Dodgers traded Kemp to the Cincinnati Reds, along with Yasiel Puig, Alex Wood, Kyle Farmer, and cash considerations in exchange for Homer Bailey, Jeter Downs, and Josiah Gray.

On May 4, 2019, Kemp was released by the Reds. Kemp, in 60 at bats, had only 12 hits, 1 walk, and 5 RBIs, batting .200/.210/.283. In 2019, he had the slowest sprint speed of all major league left fielders, at 25.4 feet/second.

=== New York Mets ===
On May 24, 2019, Kemp was signed by the New York Mets to a minor-league deal. He was placed on the 7-day Injured List on June 12, retroactive to June 8. He was released on July 12.

=== Miami Marlins ===
On December 18, 2019, Kemp signed a minor-league deal with the Miami Marlins. He was released on June 30, 2020.

=== Colorado Rockies (2020) ===
On June 30, 2020, Kemp signed a minor-league deal with the Colorado Rockies. On July 17, 2020, it was announced that Kemp would have his contract selected to the 40-man roster by the Rockies in advance of Opening Day. His contract was selected the following day. For the 2020 season, Kemp slashed .239/.326/.419 with six home runs and 21 RBIs in 43 games for the Rockies. He became a free agent after the season.

In May 2021, Kemp was named to the roster of the United States national baseball team for the Americas Qualifying Event.

== Post-playing career ==
On February 26, 2024, Kemp was hired by the Dodgers to serve in an advisory role. Later that year in August, Kemp officially announced his retirement.

== Nickname ==
Kemp's nickname is "The Bison." During the second major league game of Kemp's career, on May 29, 2006, he stole second base in the fourth inning, after which Atlanta Braves television announcer Don Sutton said he looked "like a big buffalo running around the bases." The observation was appropriate due to Kemp's imposing size – the Dodgers' roster listed him at 6' 4" tall and 225 pounds – and surprisingly fast foot-speed. The word "buffalo" was modified to "bison", by the commenter D4P on Jon Weisman's Dodgers blog, Dodger Thoughts, as it is a more proper term for the North American mammal to which the moniker refers. It wasn't until the next day when the starting lineup did not include Kemp that baseball writer Eric Enders, also commenting in Dodger Thoughts added the capitalized article in front of the animal, completing the nickname, writing "So much for looking forward to watching The Bison tonight."

The nickname also refers to Kemp's Oklahoma roots. The bison is the official state animal of Oklahoma.

== Personal life ==
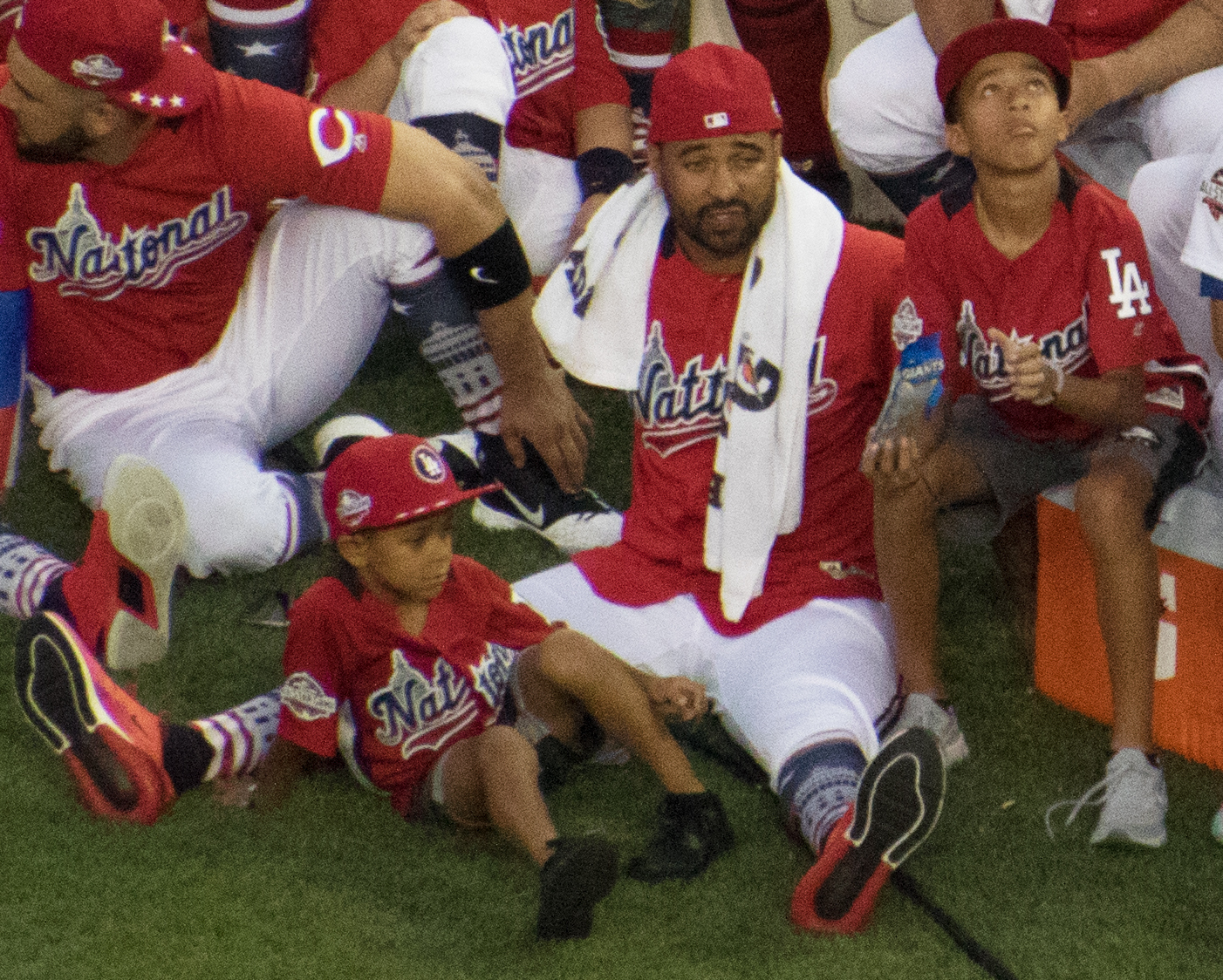
Kemp at the 2018 Major League Baseball Home Run Derby

In 2008, an ex-girlfriend filed a restraining order against Kemp, claiming that she had been abused by him. However, she later dropped the complaint and her representative stated that the restraining order "had nothing to do with domestic violence." Kemp dated pop singer Rihanna for a time beginning November 2009.

Kemp bought a home in Poway, California in 2013, but sold it in 2020 for $4.3 million. He currently resides in Dallas.

Kemp is involved in charities for children, even creating a community initiative called Kemp's Kids which hosted children from the Los Angeles area during several games at Dodger Stadium. Some of these children were from the Challenger Boys & Girls Club.

== See also ==
- List of Major League Baseball annual home run leaders
- List of Major League Baseball annual runs batted in leaders
- List of Major League Baseball annual runs scored leaders
- List of Major League Baseball career home run leaders
- List of Major League Baseball career runs batted in leaders
- List of Major League Baseball career strikeouts by batters leaders
- List of Major League Baseball home run records
- List of Major League Baseball players to hit for the cycle
- Los Angeles Dodgers award winners and league leaders

Awards and achievements
Preceded by Ryan Braun	National League Player of the Month; April 2012	Succeeded by Giancarlo Stanton
Preceded by Adrián Beltré	Hitting for the cycle August 14, 2015	Succeeded by Freddie Freeman
