= Los Angeles Dodgers award winners and league leaders =

This is a list of award winners and league leaders for the Los Angeles Dodgers professional baseball franchise, including its years in Brooklyn (1883–1957).

== Awards ==
=== Most Valuable Player (NL) ===
Chalmers Award presented from 1911–14 to honor the "most important and useful player to the club and the league". League Award presented from 1922–29 to honor "the baseball player who is of the greatest all-around service to his club." Most Valuable Player Award presented since 1931 to honor the best player in each league as voted on by the Baseball Writers' Association of America (BBWAA).

- Brooklyn
  - 1913 – Jake Daubert
  - 1924 – Dazzy Vance
  - 1941 – Dolph Camilli
  - 1949 – Jackie Robinson
  - 1951 – Roy Campanella
  - 1953 – Roy Campanella
  - 1955 – Roy Campanella
  - 1956 – Don Newcombe
- Los Angeles
  - 1962 – Maury Wills
  - 1963 – Sandy Koufax
  - 1974 – Steve Garvey
  - 1988 – Kirk Gibson
  - 2014 – Clayton Kershaw
  - 2019 – Cody Bellinger
  - 2024 – Shohei Ohtani
  - 2025 – Shohei Ohtani

=== Cy Young (NL) ===
Given annually to the best pitchers in Major League Baseball as voted by the BBWAA. From 1956–66 there was one award, since 1967 there were awards for each of the National League and American League.

- Brooklyn
  - 1956 – Don Newcombe (MLB)
- Los Angeles
  - 1962 – Don Drysdale (MLB)
  - 1963 – Sandy Koufax (MLB)
  - 1965 – Sandy Koufax (MLB)
  - 1966 – Sandy Koufax (MLB)
  - 1974 – Mike Marshall
  - 1981 – Fernando Valenzuela
  - 1988 – Orel Hershiser
  - 2003 – Éric Gagné
  - 2011 – Clayton Kershaw
  - 2013 – Clayton Kershaw
  - 2014 – Clayton Kershaw

=== Jackie Robinson Rookie of the Year Award (NL) ===
Given annually to the top performing rookie of the year as voted by the BBWAA. 1947–48 there was only one winner, starting in 1949 two awards were given, one to each league. Originally just the "Rookie of the Year" Award, Jackie Robinson's name was added to it in 1987.

- Brooklyn
  - 1947 – Jackie Robinson (MLB)
  - 1949 – Don Newcombe
  - 1952 – Joe Black
  - 1953 – Jim Gilliam
- Los Angeles
  - 1960 – Frank Howard
  - 1965 – Jim Lefebvre
  - 1969 – Ted Sizemore
  - 1979 – Rick Sutcliffe
  - 1980 – Steve Howe
  - 1981 – Fernando Valenzuela
  - 1982 – Steve Sax
  - 1992 – Eric Karros
  - 1993 – Mike Piazza
  - 1994 – Raúl Mondesi
  - 1995 – Hideo Nomo
  - 1996 – Todd Hollandsworth
  - 2016 – Corey Seager
  - 2017 – Cody Bellinger

=== Manager of the Year (NL) ===
Award given annually (since 1983) to the top managers in each league as voted by the BBWAA.

- Tommy Lasorda (1983 and 1988)
- Dave Roberts (2016)

=== Comeback Player of the Year Award ===
Award given annually (since 2005) for the player who is judged to have re-emerged on the baseball field during a given season as selected by Major League Baseball.

- 2006 – Nomar Garciaparra

=== MLB Executive of the Year Award ===
Award given annually (since 2018) by Major League Baseball to one executive as chosen by all 30 teams.)

- 2020 - Andrew Friedman

=== Commissioner's Historic Achievement Award ===
Award presented by the Commissioner of Baseball to a group or person who has made a major impact on the sport of baseball.

- 2007 – Rachel Robinson (wife of Jackie)
- 2014 – Vin Scully

=== Gold Glove Award (NL) ===
Award given annually (since 1957) to the best fielding player at each position as selected by the Rawlings Corporation.

Pitcher

- Andy Messersmith [2] (1974–75)
- Fernando Valenzuela (1986)
- Orel Hershiser (1988)
- Greg Maddux [2] (2006, 2008)
- Clayton Kershaw (2011)
- Zack Greinke [2] (2014–15)

Catcher

- John Roseboro [2] (1961, 1966)
- Charles Johnson (1998)
- Russell Martin (2007)

First Base

- Gil Hodges [3] (1957–59)
- Wes Parker [6] (1967–1972)
- Steve Garvey [4] (1974–77)
- Adrián González (2014)

Second Base

- Charlie Neal (1959)
- Davey Lopes (1978)
- Orlando Hudson (2009)

Shortstop

- Maury Wills [2] (1961–62)
- César Izturis (2004)

Third base

- NONE

Outfield

- Wally Moon (1960)
- Willie Davis [3] (1971–73)
- Dusty Baker (1981)
- Raúl Mondesí [2] (1995, 1997)
- Steve Finley (2004)
- Matt Kemp [2] (2009, 2011)
- Andre Ethier (2011)
- Cody Bellinger (2019)
- Mookie Betts [2] (2020, 2022)

=== Silver Slugger Award (NL) ===
Awarded annually (since 1980) for the best offensive season at each position as selected by MLB Managers and Coaches.

Pitcher

- Fernando Valenzuela [2] (1981, 1983)
- Tim Leary (1988)
- Orel Hershiser (1993)
- Zack Greinke (2013)

Designated hitter

- Shohei Ohtani [2] (2024, 2025)

Catcher

- Mike Piazza [5] (1993–1997)
- Russell Martin (2007)

First base

- Eddie Murray (1990)
- Eric Karros (1995)
- Adrián González (2014)

Second base

- Steve Sax (1986)
- Jeff Kent (2005)

Third base

- Adrián Beltré (2004)

Shortstop

- Corey Seager [2] (2016-2017)
- Trea Turner (2022)

Outfield

- Dusty Baker [2] (1980-1981)
- Pedro Guerrero (1982)
- Kirk Gibson (1988)
- Andre Ethier (2009)
- Matt Kemp [2] (2009, 2011)
- Cody Bellinger (2019)
- Mookie Betts [3] (2020, 2022–2023)
- Teoscar Hernández (2024)

Utility player

- Mookie Betts (2024)

=== Wilson Defensive Player of the Year Award ===
(Awarded annually between 2012 and 2019 for the best defensive player in MLB at each position as selected by Wilson Sporting Goods.)

Defensive Team of the Year

- (2017)

First base (in MLB)

- Adrián González (2014)

Third base (in MLB)

- Juan Uribe (in MLB) (2014)

Right field (in MLB)

- Yasiel Puig (2017)

=== Fielding Bible Award ===
(Awarded annually (since 2006) for the best defensive players in MLB at each position as selected by Sports Info Solutions.)

First base (in MLB)

- Adrián González (2014)

Shortstop (in MLB)

- Mookie Betts (2025)

Center field (in MLB)

- Cody Bellinger (2019)
- Mookie Betts [2] (2020, 2022)

Multi-positional (in MLB)

- Cody Bellinger (2019)
- Enrique Hernández (2020)
- Mookie Betts (2023)

=== Hank Aaron Award ===
Award given annually (since 1999) by Major League Baseball to the top hitter in each league as voted on by fans and members of the media.

- 2011 – Matt Kemp
- 2024 – Shohei Ohtani
- 2025 – Shohei Ohtani

=== Edgar Martínez Award ===
Award presented annually (since 1973) to honor the top Designated Hitter in Major League Baseball. Originally selected by the Associated Press, it has been presented by the BBWAA since 2000.

- 2024 – Shohei Ohtani
- 2025 – Shohei Ohtani

=== Roberto Clemente Award ===
Award given annually (since 1971) by Major League Baseball to the player who "best represents the game of Baseball through extraordinary character, community involvement, philanthropy and positive contributions, both on and off the field." Originally the Commissioner's Award, it was re-named to honor Clemente in 1973.

- 1981 – Steve Garvey
- 2012 – Clayton Kershaw
- 2022 – Justin Turner
- 2025 – Mookie Betts

=== Rolaids Relief Man Award ===
Award given by Major League Baseball from 1976–2012 to the top relief pitchers in each league, sponsored by Rolaids.

- 2003 – Éric Gagné
- 2004 – Éric Gagné

=== Trevor Hoffman NL Reliever of the Year Award ===
Award given by Major League Baseball beginning in 2014 to the top relief pitchers in the National League.

- 2016 – Kenley Jansen
- 2017 – Kenley Jansen

=== Branch Rickey Award ===
Given annually by Major League Baseball in recognition of his exceptional community service from 1992 to 2014.

- 1996 – Brett Butler
- 2006 – Tommy Lasorda
- 2013 – Clayton Kershaw

=== Warren Spahn Award ===
Presented each season by the Oklahoma Sports Hall of Fame to the best left-handed pitcher in Major League Baseball.

- Clayton Kershaw [3] (2011, 2013, 2014)
- Julio Urías [2] (2021, 2022)

=== All-MLB Team ===
An Annual honor given (since 2019) to the best players in each league as determined by a fan vote and a panel consisting of media members, former players, and baseball officials.

- 2019 – First Team: Cody Bellinger (OF); Second Team: Hyun-jin Ryu (P)
- 2020 – First Team: Mookie Betts (OF); Second Team: Clayton Kershaw (P) & Corey Seager (SS)
- 2021 – First Team: Walker Buehler (P) & Max Scherzer (P); Second Team: Trea Turner (SS) & Julio Urías (P)
- 2022 – First Team: Mookie Betts (OF) & Trea Turner (SS); Second Team: Freddie Freeman (1B), Will Smith (C) & Julio Urías (P)
- 2023 – First Team: Mookie Betts (OF) & Freddie Freeman (1B)
- 2024 – First Team: Mookie Betts (OF) & Shohei Ohtani (DH); Second Team: Teoscar Hernández (OF)
- 2025 – First Team: Shohei Ohtani (DH) & Yoshinobu Yamamoto (P); Second Team: Will Smith (C)
- 2026 – Second Team: Tarik Skubal (P) & Yoshinobu Yamamoto (P)

=== Post-Season and All-Star Game MVP ===
- World Series
  First presented in 1955 by Sport Magazine and since 1985 by Major League Baseball. Officially known as the "Willie Mays World Series Most Valuable Player Award" since 2017.
  - 1955 – Johnny Podres
  - 1959 – Larry Sherry
  - 1963 – Sandy Koufax
  - 1965 – Sandy Koufax
  - 1981 – Ron Cey, Pedro Guerrero and Steve Yeager
  - 1988 – Orel Hershiser
  - 2020 – Corey Seager
  - 2024 – Freddie Freeman
  - 2025 – Yoshinobu Yamamoto
    Sandy Koufax
- NL Championship Series
  Presented since 1977 by the National League.
  - 1977 – Dusty Baker
  - 1978 – Steve Garvey
  - 1981 – Burt Hooton
  - 1988 – Orel Hershiser
  - 2017 – Chris Taylor and Justin Turner
  - 2018 – Cody Bellinger
  - 2020 – Corey Seager
  - 2024 – Tommy Edman
  - 2025 – Shohei Ohtani
- All-Star Game
  Awarded each season since 1962, originally the "Arch Ward Memorial Award" then the "Commissioner's Trophy" and officially the Ted Williams Most Valuable Player Award since 2002.
  - 1962 – Maury Wills (Game 1)
  - 1977 – Don Sutton
  - 1978 – Steve Garvey
  - 1996 – Mike Piazza

=== Topps All-Star Rookie teams ===
A selection of notable Major League Baseball rookie players chosen annually by the Topps Company in most years since 1959.

- 1959 – Ron Fairly (OF)
- 1960 – Tommy Davis (OF) & Frank Howard (OF)
- 1969 – Ted Sizemore (2B)
- 1971 – Bill Buckner (OF)
- 1973 – Davey Lopes (2B)
- 1981 – Fernando Valenzuela (P)
- 1982 – Steve Sax (2B)
- 1983 – Greg Brock (1B)
- 1988 – Tim Belcher (P)
- 1992 – Eric Karros (1B)
- 1993 – Mike Piazza (C)
- 1994 – Raúl Mondesí (OF)
- 1995 – Hideo Nomo (P)
- 1996 – Todd Hollandsworth (OF)
- 1997 – Wilton Guerrero (2B)
- 2006 – Russell Martin (C) & Andre Ethier (OF)
- 2007 – James Loney (1B)
- 2011 – Dee Gordon (SS)
- 2013 – Yasiel Puig (OF) & Hyun-jin Ryu (P)
- 2016 – Kenta Maeda (P), Corey Seager (SS), Julio Urías (P)
- 2017 – Cody Bellinger (1B)
- 2018 – Walker Buehler (RHP)
- 2019 – Will Smith (C)
- 2020 – Tony Gonsolin (RHP)
- 2023 – James Outman (OF)

=== Baseball America Awards ===
==== MLB Player of the Year ====
Presented since 1988

- 2011 – Matt Kemp
- 2014 – Clayton Kershaw

==== Rookie of the Year ====
Presented since 1989

- 1993 – Mike Piazza
- 1994 – Raúl Mondesí
- 1995 – Hideo Nomo
- 2016 – Corey Seager
- 2020 – Tony Gonsolin

==== Organization of the Year ====
Presented since 1982

- 2006
- 2017
- 2020

==== Executive of the Year ====
Presented since 2006

- 2020 – Andrew Friedman

==== Baseball America All-Rookie Team ====
- 2011 – Dee Gordon (SS)
- 2013 – Yasiel Puig (OF), Hyun-jin Ryu (P)
- 2015 – Joc Pederson (OF)
- 2016 – Kenta Maeda (P), Corey Seager (SS)
- 2017 – Cody Bellinger (1B)
- 2018 – Walker Buehler (P)
- 2019 – Will Smith (C)
- 2020 – Tony Gonsolin (P), Dustin May (P)
- 2023 – Bobby Miller (P), James Outman (OF)

=== The Sporting News Awards ===
==== Most Valuable Player Award ====
Awarded from 1929 through 1945

- 1941 – Dolph Camilli

==== Player of the Year Award ====
Since 1939

- 1955 – Duke Snider
- 1962 – Don Drysdale & Maury Wills
- 1963 – Sandy Koufax
- 1965 – Sandy Koufax
- 1981 – Fernando Valenzuela
- 1988 – Orel Hershiser
- 2014 – Clayton Kershaw
- 2024 – Shohei Ohtani

==== Pitcher of the Year Award ====
Since 1944, split into separate starter and reliever awards in 2013.

- 1951 – Preacher Roe
- 1956 – Don Newcombe
- 1962 – Don Drysdale
- 1963 – Sandy Koufax
- 1964 – Sandy Koufax
- 1965 – Sandy Koufax
- 1966 – Sandy Koufax
- 1974 – Mike Marshall
- 1981 – Fernando Valenzuela
- 1988 – Orel Hershiser
- 2003 – Éric Gagné
- 2011 – Clayton Kershaw
- 2013 – Clayton Kershaw (starter)
- 2014 – Clayton Kershaw (starter)
- 2015 – Zack Greinke (starter)
- 2016 – Kenley Jansen (reliever)
- 2017 – Kenley Jansen (reliever)
- 2021 – Max Scherzer (starter)

==== Manager of the Year ====
Since 1936, originally just one award but split to honor one from each league in 1986

- 1939 – Leo Durocher
- 1955 – Walter Alston
- 1959 – Walter Alston
- 1963 – Walter Alston
- 2016 – Dave Roberts

==== Rookie of the Year ====
1946–50 one award, split into separate National & American League Awards in 1951
and from 1963–2003 there were separate awards for rookie pitchers and players.

- 1947 – Jackie Robinson
- 1949 – Don Newcombe
- 1952 – Joe Black
- 1953 – Jim Gilliam
- 1960 – Frank Howard
- 1966 – Don Sutton (pitcher)
- 1979 – Rick Sutcliffe (pitcher)
- 1981 – Fernando Valenzuela (pitcher)
- 1988 – Tim Belcher (pitcher)
- 1992 – Eric Karros (player)
- 1993 – Mike Piazza (player)
- 1994 – Raúl Mondesí (player)
- 1995 – Hideo Nomo (pitcher)
- 2016 – Corey Seager
- 2018 – Cody Bellinger

==== Reliever of the Year ====
Awarded from 1960 through 2010, called the "Fireman of the Year" Award until 2000

- 1966 – Phil Regan
- 1973 – Mike Marshall
- 1974 – Mike Marshall
- 2003 – Éric Gagné
- 2004 – Éric Gagné

==== Comeback Player of the Year ====
Since 1965

- 1966 – Phil Regan
- 1971 – Al Downing
- 1974 – Jimmy Wynn
- 1976 – Tommy John
- 1980 – Jerry Reuss
- 1988 – Tim Leary
- 1994 – Tim Wallach
- 2006 – Nomar Garciaparra
- 2018 – Matt Kemp

==== Executive of the Year ====
Since 1936

- 1939 – Larry MacPhail
- 1947 – Branch Rickey
- 1955 – Walter O'Malley
- 1959 – Buzzie Bavasi
- 1988 – Fred Claire

=== Associated Press Manager of the Year Award ===
Discontinued in 2001. From 1959 to 1983, the award was given annually to one manager in each league.
From 1984 to 2000, the award was given to one manager in all of Major League Baseball.

- 1959 – Walter Alston (in NL)
- 1965 – Walter Alston (in NL)
- 1966 – Walter Alston (in NL)
- 1974 – Walter Alston (in NL)
- 1977 – Tommy Lasorda (in NL)
- 1981 – Tommy Lasorda (in NL)
- 1983 – Tommy Lasorda (in NL)
- 1988 – Tommy Lasorda (in MLB)

=== Chuck Tanner Major League Baseball Manager of the Year Award ===
Presented by the Rotary Club of Pittsburgh and awarded between 2007–12

- Joe Torre (2007)

=== Players Choice Awards ===
Awards presented by the Major League Baseball Players Association

==== Player of the Year ====
Presented since 1998

- 2014 – Clayton Kershaw

==== Marvin Miller Man of the Year Award ====
Presented since 1997 to "the player in either league whose on-field performance
and contributions to his community inspire others to higher levels of achievement."

- 2014 – Clayton Kershaw

==== Outstanding Player ====
Presented to one player in each league since 1993

- 2011 – Matt Kemp
- 2024 – Shohei Ohtani

==== Comeback Player ====
Presented to one player in each league since 1992

- 2006 – Nomar Garciaparra
- 2018 – Matt Kemp

==== Outstanding Pitcher ====
Presented to one player in each league since 1994

- 2003 – Éric Gagné
- 2011 – Clayton Kershaw
- 2013 – Clayton Kershaw
- 2014 – Clayton Kershaw
- 2015 – Zack Greinke
- 2021 – Max Scherzer

==== Outstanding Rookie ====
Presented to one player in each league since 1994

- 1994 – Raúl Mondesí
- 1996 – Todd Hollandsworth
- 2016 – Corey Seager
- 2017 – Cody Bellinger

=== This Year in Baseball Awards ===
Presented by Major League Baseball from 2002 to 2017, known originally as the "GIBBY AWARDS" and renamed the "Esurance MLB Awards" in 2015

- 2008 – Hung-Chih Kuo (setup man of the year)
- 2011 – Matt Kemp (player of the year)
- 2013 – Clayton Kershaw (starter of the year)
- 2014 – Clayton Kershaw (starter of the year) (pitching performance of the year)
- 2015 – Vin Scully (radio call of the year)
- 2016 – Vin Scully (radio call of the year), Corey Seager (rookie of the year)

=== MLB Player of the Month ===
Presented monthly to one player from each league since 1958.

- 1959 – Don Drysdale (July)
- 1960 – Don Drysdale (July)
- 1962 – Sandy Koufax (June)
  Frank Howard (July)
- 1968 – Don Drysdale (May)
- 1969 – Willie Davis (August)
- 1970 – Bill Singer (July)
- 1972 – Don Sutton (April)
- 1973 – Willie Crawford (May)
- 1974 – Tommy John (April)
- 1976 – Steve Garvey (September)
- 1977 – Ron Cey (April)
- 1978 – Rick Monday (April)
- 1980 – Dusty Baker (June)
- 1983 – Dusty Baker (July)
- 1985 – Pedro Guerrero (June)
- 1986 – Steve Sax (September)
- 1990 – Kal Daniels (September)
- 1992 – Brett Butler (July)
- 1994 – Mike Piazza (May)
- 1995 – Mike Piazza (August)
- 1997 – Mike Piazza (June) (August)
- 2002 – Brian Jordan (September)
- 2004 – Adrián Beltré (September)
- 2008 – Manny Ramirez (August)
- 2012 – Matt Kemp (April)
- 2013 – Yasiel Puig (June)
- 2014 – Yasiel Puig (May)
  Matt Kemp (September)
- 2015 – Adrián González (April)
- 2018 – Justin Turner (August)
- 2019 – Cody Bellinger (April)
- 2023 – Freddie Freeman (May)
  Mookie Betts (August)
- 2024 – Mookie Betts (April)
  Shohei Ohtani (September)
- 2025 – Shohei Ohtani (May)

=== MLB Rookie of the Month ===
Presented monthly to one pitcher from each league since 2001.

- 2002 – Kazuhisa Ishii (April)
- 2007 – James Loney (September)
- 2008 – Blake DeWitt (May)
- 2011 – Dee Gordon (September)
- 2013 – Yasiel Puig (June)
- 2015 – Alex Guerrero (April)
- 2016 – Corey Seager (June)
- 2017 – Cody Bellinger (May) (June)
- 2023 – James Outman (April) (August)

=== MLB Pitcher of the Month ===
Presented monthly to one pitcher from each league since 1975.

- 1975 – Don Sutton (April) (May)
  Burt Hooton (August) (September)
- 1976 – Don Sutton (September)
- 1980 – Jerry Reuss (June)
- 1981 – Fernando Valenzuela (April)
- 1982 – Steve Howe (June)
- 1983 – Burt Hooton (June)
- 1984 – Orel Hershiser (July)
- 1985 – Fernando Valenzuela (April) (July)
- 1987 – Orel Hershiser (June)
- 1988 – Orel Hershiser (April) (September)
- 1989 – Tim Belcher (September)
- 1990 – Ramón Martínez (June)
- 1995 – Hideo Nomo (June)
- 1996 – Hideo Nomo (September)
- 1998 – Chan Ho Park (July)
- 2002 – Éric Gagné (June)
- 2003 – Kevin Brown (May)
- 2006 – Derek Lowe (August)
- 2011 – Clayton Kershaw (July)
- 2013 – Clayton Kershaw (July)
  Zack Greinke (August)
- 2014 – Clayton Kershaw (June) (July)
- 2015 – Clayton Kershaw (July)
- 2016 – Clayton Kershaw (May)
- 2017 – Alex Wood (May)
  Rich Hill (July)
- 2019 – Hyun-jin Ryu (May)
- 2021 – Walker Buehler (July)
- 2023 – Clayton Kershaw (April)
- 2025 – Yoshinobu Yamamoto (April) (September)
- 2026 – Shohei Ohtani (April)

=== MLB Reliever of the Month ===
Presented monthly to one pitcher in MLB as the "Delivery Man of the Month" from 2005–10
and then presented to one pitcher from each league as the Reliever of the Month starting in 2017.

- 2007 – Takashi Saito (August)
- 2017 – Kenley Jansen (June)
- 2020 – Kenley Jansen (July/August)

=== MLB Player of the Week ===
Awarded weekly since 1973

- 1973 – Ron Cey (05/18)
  Willie Crawford (05/25)
  Willie Davis (07/13)
- 1974 – Tommy John (04/26)
  Jimmy Wynn (05/10)
  Mike Marshall (06/21)
  Davey Lopes (08/23)
  Andy Messersmith (09/20)
- 1975 – Don Sutton (08/08)
  Burt Hooton (08/08)
  Andy Messersmith (09/12)
- 1976 – Steve Garvey (05/21)
  Reggie Smith (07/09)
  Doug Rau (07/23)
  Don Sutton (09/24)
- 1977 – Ron Cey (04/22)
  Steve Garvey (06/24)
  Tommy John (08/12)
- 1978 – Rick Monday (04/21)
  Steve Garvey (08/18)
- 1979 – Dusty Baker (05/26)
  Manny Mota (09/01)
- 1980 – Don Sutton (04/25)
  Bob Welch (05/16)
  Jerry Reuss (06/27)
- 1981 – Fernando Valenzuela (04/10)
  Ron Cey (05/15)
  Fernando Valenzuela (09/04)
- 1982 – Jerry Reuss (06/18)
  Pedro Guerrero (08/27)
  Dusty Baker (09/10)
- 1983 – Dusty Baker (07/15)
  Mike Marshall (09/09)
- 1984 – Candy Maldonado (04/20)
  Orel Hershiser (07/13)
- 1985 – Pedro Guerrero (06/14)
  Pedro Guerrero (07/26)
  Mike Marshall (09/14)
- 1986 – Fernando Valenzuela (05/02)
  Fernando Valenzuela (05/23)
  Franklin Stubbs (07/18)
  Orel Hershiser (08/01)
- 1987 – Orel Hershiser (06/12)
  Alejandro Peña (10/02)
- 1988 – Tim Leary (07/22)
  Orel Hershiser (09/30)
- 1989 – José González (07/01)
  Jay Howell (08/05)
  Tim Belcher (08/26)
- 1990 – Fernando Valenzuela (06/30)
- 1991 – Mike Morgan (06/22)
  Darryl Strawberry (08/24)
- 1992 – Tom Candiotti (04/18)
  Brett Butler (07/25)
  Eric Karros (08/01)
  Kevin Gross (08/22)
- 1993 – Mike Piazza (05/01)
  Mike Piazza (06/19)
  Mike Piazza (10/02)
- 1994 – Mike Piazza (05/21)
- 1995 – Raúl Mondesí (04/29)
  Mike Piazza (05/06)
  Hideo Nomo (06/24)
  Ramón Martínez (07/15)
  Eric Karros (07/29)
  Eric Karros (08/12)
  Mike Piazza (08/26)
- 1996 – Hideo Nomo (04/13)
- 1997 – Mike Piazza (08/30)
- 1998 – Mike Piazza (04/11)
  Mike Piazza (04/25)
  Raúl Mondesí (07/14)
- 1999 – Raúl Mondesí (04/10)
  Eric Karros (09/25)
- 2000 – Gary Sheffield (06/17)
  Gary Sheffield (07/15)
  Adrián Beltré (08/26)
  Chan Ho Park (09/23)
- 2001 – Gary Sheffield (04/14)
- 2002 – Odalis Pérez (04/20)
  Shawn Green (05/25)
- 2003 – Éric Gagné (08/09)
- 2004 – Adrián Beltré (06/26)
- 2006 – Nomar Garciaparra (05/13)
  Andre Ethier (07/07)
- 2008 – Matt Kemp (05/03)
  Andre Ethier (09/06)
- 2009 – Andre Ethier (04/18)
  Andre Ethier (07/25)
- 2010 – Rafael Furcal (07/05)
- 2011 – Clayton Kershaw (06/26)
- 2012 – Matt Kemp (04/08)
  Matt Kemp (04/15)
  Clayton Kershaw (05/20)
- 2013 – Clayton Kershaw (04/07)
  Yasiel Puig (06/09)
- 2014 – Yasiel Puig (05/18)
  Josh Beckett (05/25)
  Clayton Kershaw (06/22)
  Matt Kemp (08/03)
  Clayton Kershaw (09/14)
- 2015 – Adrián González (04/12)
  Clayton Kershaw (06/07)
  Zack Greinke (07/19)
  Clayton Kershaw (07/19)
- 2017 – Cody Bellinger (05/06)
  Alex Wood (05/13)
  Cody Bellinger (06/24)
  Clayton Kershaw (07/08)
- 2018 – Matt Kemp (06/02)
  Yasiel Puig (09/15)
- 2019 – Cody Bellinger (04/06)
  Hyun-jin Ryu (5/11)
  Corey Seager (09/21)
- 2021 – A. J. Pollock (07/10)
  Chris Taylor (07/24)
  Max Scherzer (09/11)
  Trea Turner (10/02)
- 2022 – Cody Bellinger (04/23)
  Freddie Freeman (06/25)
  Freddie Freeman (07/16)
  Mookie Betts (08/27)
  Freddie Freeman (09/10)
- 2023 – Max Muncy (04/22)
  Freddie Freeman (08/05)
  Mookie Betts (08/26)
  J. D. Martinez (09/23)
- 2024 – Shohei Ohtani (05/04)
  Teoscar Hernández (06/08)
  Shohei Ohtani (06/22)
  Gavin Lux (07/20)
  Shohei Ohtani (09/21)
  Shohei Ohtani (09/28)
- 2025 – Andy Pages (04/26)
  Freddie Freeman (05/10)
  Mookie Betts (09/13)
- 2026 – Andy Pages (03/30)

== All-Star Game selections ==
Players and Managers selected for the mid-season all-star games, chosen alternatively by fans, players and coaches

Pitchers

- Tyler Anderson (2022)
- Chad Billingsley (2009)
- Ralph Branca [3] (1947, 1948, 1949)
- Jim Brewer (1973)
- Kevin Brown [2] (2000, 2003)
- Jonathan Broxton [2] (2009, 2010)
- Walker Buehler [2] (2019, 2021)
- Don Drysdale [9] (1959, 1959-2, 1961-2, 1962, 1963, 1964, 1965, 1967, 1968)
- Carl Erskine (1954)
- Éric Gagné [3] (2002, 2003, 2004)
- Tyler Glasnow (2024)
- Tony Gonsolin (2022)
- Zack Greinke [2] (2014, 2015)
- Orel Hershiser [3] (1987, 1988, 1989)
- Kirby Higbe (1946)
- Burt Hooton (1981)
- Steve Howe (1982)
- Jay Howell (1989)
- Kenley Jansen [3] (2016, 2017, 2018)
- Tommy John (1978)
- Clayton Kershaw [11] (2011, 2012, 2013, 2014, 2015, 2016, 2017, 2019, 2022, 2023, 2025)
- Sandy Koufax [7] (1961, 1961-2, 1962, 1963, 1964, 1965, 1966)
- Hong-Chih Kuo (2010)
- Clem Labine [2] (1956, 1957)
- Mike Marshall [2] (1974, 1975)
- Ramón Martínez (1990)
- Andy Messersmith [2] (1974, 1975)
- Mike Morgan (1991)
- Van Lingle Mungo [4] (1934, 1935, 1936, 1937)
- Don Newcombe [4] (1949, 1950, 1951, 1955)
- Hideo Nomo (1995)
- Claude Osteen [3] (1967, 1970, 1973)
- Chan Ho Park (2001)
- Brad Penny [2] (2006, 2007)
- Odalis Pérez (2002)
- Johnny Podres [4] (1958, 1960, 1960-2, 1962-2)
- Phil Regan (1966)
- Jerry Reuss (1980)
- Rick Rhoden (1976)
- Preacher Roe [4] (1949, 1950, 1951, 1952)
- Hyun-jin Ryu (2019)
- Takashi Saito (2007)
- Jeff Shaw [2] (1998, 2001)
- Bill Singer (1969)
- Ross Stripling (2018)
- Don Sutton [4] (1972, 1973, 1975, 1977)
- Fernando Valenzuela [6] (1981, 1982, 1983, 1984, 1985, 1986)
- Bob Welch (1980)
- Stan Williams (1960, 1960-2)
- Alex Wood (2017)
- Todd Worrell [2] (1995, 1996)
- Justin Wrobleski (2026)
- Whit Wyatt [4] (1939, 1940, 1941, 1942)
- Yoshinobu Yamamoto [2] (2025, 2026)

Catcher

- Roy Campanella [8] (1949, 1950, 1951, 1952, 1953, 1954, 1955, 1956)
- Bruce Edwards (1947)
- Yasmani Grandal (2015)
- Tom Haller (1968)
- Paul Lo Duca [2] (2003, 2004)
- Al López (1934)
- Russell Martin [2] (2007, 2008)
- Mickey Owen [4] (1941, 1942, 1943, 1944)
- Babe Phelps [3] (1938, 1939, 1940)
- Mike Piazza [5] (1993, 1994, 1995, 1996, 1997)
- John Roseboro [5] (1958, 1961, 1961-2, 1962, 1962-2)
- Mike Scioscia [2] (1989, 1990)
- Will Smith [3] (2023, 2024, 2025)

First Baseman

- Dolph Camilli [2] (1939, 1941)
- Freddie Freeman [5] (2022, 2023, 2024, 2025, 2026)
- Nomar Garciaparra (2006)
- Steve Garvey [8] (1974, 1975, 1976, 1977, 1978, 1979, 1980, 1981)
- Jim Gilliam (1956)
- Adrián González (2015)
- Gil Hodges [8] (1949, 1950, 1951, 1952, 1953, 1954, 1955, 1957)
- Norm Larker (1960, 1960-2)
- Max Muncy [2] (2019, 2021)
- Eddie Murray (1991)
- Eddie Stanky (1947)

Second Baseman

- Pete Coscarart (1940)
- Tony Cuccinello (1933)
- Dee Gordon (2014)
- Billy Grabarkewitz (1970)
- Billy Herman [3] (1941, 1942, 1943)
- Orlando Hudson (2009)
- Jeff Kent (2005)
- Jim Lefebvre (1966)
- Davey Lopes [4] (1978, 1979, 1980, 1981)
- Charlie Neal [2] (1960, 1960-2)
- Willie Randolph (1989)
- Jackie Robinson [4] (1949, 1950, 1951, 1952)
- Juan Samuel (1991)
- Steve Sax [3] (1982, 1983, 1986)
- Mike Sharperson (1992)

Shortstop

- Mookie Betts (2024)
- Leo Durocher [2] (1938, 1940)
- Rafael Furcal (2010)
- César Izturis (2005)
- Charlie Neal (1959-2)
- José Offerman (1995)
- Pee Wee Reese [10] (1942, 1946, 1947, 1948, 1949, 1950, 1951, 1952, 1953, 1954)
- Bill Russell [3] (1973, 1976, 1980)
- Corey Seager [2] (2016, 2017)
- Trea Turner (2022)
- Maury Wills [6] (1961, 1961-2, 1962, 1962-2, 1963, 1965, 1966)

Third Baseman

- Ron Cey [6] (1974, 1975, 1976, 1977, 1978, 1979)
- Pedro Guerrero (1983)
- Cookie Lavagetto [4] (1938, 1939, 1940, 1941)
- Max Muncy (2026)
- Jackie Robinson (1953)
- Justin Turner [2] (2017, 2021)
- Arky Vaughan (1942)

Outfielder

- Dusty Baker [2] (1981, 1982)
- Cody Bellinger [2] (2017, 2019)
- Mookie Betts [3] (2021, 2022, 2023)
- Brett Butler (1991)
- Gino Cimoli (1957)
- Tommy Davis [3] (1962, 1962-2, 1963)
- Willie Davis [2] (1971, 1973)
- Andre Ethier [2] (2010, 2011)
- Carl Furillo [2] (1952, 1953)
- Augie Galan [2] (1943, 1944)
- Jim Gilliam (1959-2)
- Shawn Green (2002)
- Pedro Guerrero [3] (1981, 1985, 1987)
- Teoscar Hernández (2024)
- Matt Kemp [3] (2011, 2012, 2018)
- Mike Marshall (1984)
- Joe Medwick [3} (1940, 1941, 1942)
- Rick Monday (1978)
- Raúl Mondesí (1995)
- Wally Moon [2] (1959, 1959-2)
- Manny Mota (1973)
- Andy Pages (2026)
- Joc Pederson (2015)
- Yasiel Puig (2014)
- Pete Reiser [3] (1941, 1942, 1946)
- Jackie Robinson (1954)
- Gary Sheffield [3] (1998, 1999, 2000)
- Reggie Smith [3] (1977, 1978, 1980)
- Duke Snider [6] (1950, 1951, 1952, 1953, 1954, 1955, 1956)
- Darryl Strawberry (1991)
- Chris Taylor (2021)
- Dixie Walker [3] (1943, 1944, 1946, 1947)
- Jimmy Wynn [2] (1974, 1975)

Designated Hitter

- J.D. Martinez (2023)
- Shohei Ohtani [3] (2024, 2025, 2026)

Manager

- Walter Alston [8] (1954, 1956, 1957, 1960, 1964, 1966, 1967, 1975)
- Chuck Dressen (1953)
- Leo Durocher [2] (1942, 1948)
- Tommy Lasorda [4] (1978, 1979, 1982, 1989)
- Dave Roberts [5] (2018, 2019, 2021, 2025, 2026)
- Burt Shotton (1950)

Years in italics are selected starters

== Minor-league system ==
=== Baseball America Minor League Player of the Year Award ===
Presented annually since 1981.

- 1981 – Mike Marshall (Albuquerque Dukes; AAA)
- 1997 – Paul Konerko (Albuquerque Dukes; AAA)
- 2019 – Gavin Lux (Tulsa Drillers; AA & Oklahoma City Dodgers; AAA)

=== USA Today Minor League Player of the Year Award ===
Presented annually since 1988.

- 1994 – Billy Ashley (Albuquerque Dukes; AAA)

=== MiLB George M. Trautman Award / Topps Player of the Year ===
- 2009 – Brian Cavazos-Galvez (Pioneer League; Ogden Raptors; OF) & Dee Gordon (Midwest League; Great Lakes Loons; SS)

=== MiLB Joe Bauman Home Run Award ===
Presented annually (since 2002) to the top home run hitter in minor league baseball.

- 2009 – Mitch Jones (Albuquerque Isotopes; AAA; Pacific Coast League)
- 2025 – Ryan Ward (Oklahoma City Comets; AAA)

=== Los Angeles Dodgers Minor League Player of the Year ===
- 1989 – Mike Huff (Albuquerque Dukes; AAA)
- 1990 – Henry Rodríguez (San Antonio Missions; AA)
- 1991 – Eric Karros (Albuquerque Dukes; AAA)
- 1992 – Mike Piazza (San Antonio Missions; AA & Albuquerque Dukes; AAA)
- 1993 – Billy Ashley (Albuquerque Dukes; AAA)
- 1994 – Billy Ashley (Albuquerque Dukes; AAA)
- 1995 – Adam Riggs (San Bernardino Spirit; A)
- 1996 – Paul Konerko (San Antonio Missions; AA & Albuquerque Dukes; AAA)
- 1997 – Paul Konerko (Albuquerque Dukes; AAA)
- 1998 – Ángel Peña (San Antonio Missions; AA)
- 1999 – Chin-Feng Chen (San Bernardino Stampede; A)
- 2000 – Joe Thurston (San Bernardino Stampede; A)
- 2001 – Phil Hiatt (Vero Beach Dodgers; A)
- 2002 – Joe Thurston (Las Vegas 51s, AAA)
- 2003 – Franklin Gutiérrez (Vero Beach Dodgers; A & Jacksonville Suns; AA)
- 2004 – Joel Guzmán (Vero Beach Dodgers; A & Jacksonville Suns; AA)
- 2005 – Andy LaRoche (Vero Beach Dodgers; A & Jacksonville Suns; AA)
- 2006 – James Loney (Las Vegas 51s; AAA)
- 2007 – Chin-lung Hu (Jacksonville Suns; AA & Las Vegas 51s; AAA)
- 2008 – Iván DeJesús, Jr. (Jacksonville Suns; AA)
- 2009 – Dee Gordon (Great Lakes Loons; A)
- 2010 – Jerry Sands (Great Lakes Loons; A & Chattanooga Lookouts; AA)
- 2011 – Scott Van Slyke (Chattanooga Lookouts; AA)
- 2012 – Joc Pederson (Rancho Cucamonga Quakes; Hi-A)
- 2013 – Scott Schebler (Rancho Cucamonga Quakes; Hi-A)
- 2014 – Joc Pederson (Albuquerque Isotopes; AAA) & Corey Seager (Rancho Cucamonga Quakes; Hi-A & Chattanooga Lookouts; AA)
- 2015 – Alex Verdugo (Great Lakes Loons; A & Rancho Cucamonga Quakes; Hi-A)
- 2016 – Edwin Ríos (Great Lakes Loons; A, Rancho Cucamonga Quakes; Hi-A & Tulsa Drillers; AA)
- 2017 – Keibert Ruiz (Great Lakes Loons; A & Rancho Cucamonga Quakes; Hi-A)
- 2018 – Gavin Lux (Rancho Cucamonga Quakes; Hi-A & Tulsa Drillers; AA)
- 2019 – Gavin Lux (Tulsa Drillers; AA & Oklahoma City Dodgers; AAA)
- 2021 – Miguel Vargas; (Great Lakes Loons; Hi-A & Tulsa Drillers; AA)
- 2022 – Diego Cartaya; (Rancho Cucamonga Quakes; A & Great Lakes Loons; Hi-A)
- 2023 – Michael Busch; (Oklahoma City Dodgers; AAA)
- 2024 – Dalton Rushing; (Tulsa Drillers; AA & Oklahoma City Baseball Club; AAA)
- 2025 – Eduardo Quintero; (Rancho Cucamonga Quakes; A & Great Lakes Loons; High–A)
- 2026 – Josue De Paula; Tulsa Drillers; AA

=== Los Angeles Dodgers Minor League Pitcher of the Year ===
- 1989 – Jim Poole (Vero Beach Dodgers; A)
- 1990 – Jamie McAndrew (Bakersfield Dodgers; Hi-A & San Antonio Missions; AA)
- 1991 – Pedro Martínez (San Antonio Missions; AA & Albuquerque Dukes; AAA)
- 1992 – Todd Williams (Bakersfield Dodgers; Hi-A & San Antonio Dodgers; AA)
- 1993 – Kip Gross (Albuquerque Dukes; AAA)
- 1994 – Greg Hansell (Albuquerque Dukes; AAA)
- 1995 – Gary Rath (San Antonio Missions; AA & Albuquerque Dukes; AAA)
- 1996 – Billy Neal (Vero Beach Dodgers; Hi-A)
- 1997 – Dennys Reyes (San Antonio Missions; AA & Albuquerque Dukes; AAA)
- 1998 – Luke Prokopec (San Bernardino Stampede; Hi-A & San Antonio Missions; AA)
- 1999 – Éric Gagné (San Antonio Missions; AA)
- 2000 – Carlos Garcia (San Bernardino Stampede; Hi-A)
- 2001 – Ricardo Rodríguez (Vero Beach Dodgers; Hi-A)
- 2002 – Edwin Jackson (South Georgia Waves; A)
- 2003 – Greg Miller (Vero Beach Dodgers; Hi-A & Jacksonville Suns; AA)
- 2004 – Chad Billingsley (Vero Beach Dodgers; Hi-A & Jacksonville Suns; AA)
- 2005 – Chad Billingsley (Jacksonville Suns; AA)
- 2006 – Mark Alexander (Jacksonville Suns; AA & Las Vegas 51s; AAA)
- 2007 – James McDonald (Inland Empire 66ers of San Bernardino; Hi-A & Jacksonville Suns; AA)
- 2008 – James McDonald (Jacksonville Suns; AA)
- 2009 – Scott Elbert (Chattanooga Lookouts; AA & Albuquerque Isotopes; AAA)
- 2010 – Rubby De La Rosa (Great Lakes Loons; A & Chattanooga Lookouts; AA)
- 2011 – Shawn Tolleson (Chattanooga Lookouts; AA)
- 2012 – John Ely (Albuquerque Isotopes; AAA)
- 2013 – Zach Lee (Chattanooga Lookouts; AA)
- 2014 – Julio Urías (Rancho Cucamonga Quakes; Hi-A)
- 2015 – Zach Lee (Oklahoma City Dodgers; AAA)
- 2016 – Brock Stewart (Rancho Cucamonga Quakes; Hi-A, Tulsa Drillers; AA & Oklahoma City Dodgers; AAA)
- 2017 – Walker Buehler (Rancho Cucamonga Quakes; Hi-A, Tulsa Drillers; AA & Oklahoma City Dodgers; AAA)
- 2018 – Tony Gonsolin (Rancho Cucamonga Quakes; Hi-A & Tulsa Drillers; AA)
- 2019 – Josiah Gray (Great Lakes Loons; A, Rancho Cucamonga Quakes; Hi-A & Tulsa Drillers; AA)
- 2021 – Hyun-il Choi (Rancho Cucamonga Quakes; A & Great Lakes Loons; Hi-A)
- 2022 – Gavin Stone (Great Lakes Loons; High-A, Tulsa Drillers; AA & Oklahoma City Dodgers; AAA)
- 2023 – Kyle Hurt (Tulsa Drillers; AA & Oklahoma City Dodgers; AAA)
- 2024 – Jackson Ferris (Great Lakes Loons; High–A & Tulsa Drillers; AA)
- 2025 – Christian Zazueta; (Rancho Cucamonga Quakes; A & Great Lakes Loons; High–A)
- 2026 – Christian Zazueta; (Great Lakes Loons; High–A & Tulsa Drillers; AA)

== Other achievements ==
=== National Baseball Hall of Fame ===
See: Los Angeles Dodgers § Baseball Hall of Famers

=== Ford C. Frick Award recipients ===
The Ford C. Frick Award is presented annually to a broadcaster for "major contributions to baseball."

Names in bold received the award based primarily on their work as Dodgers broadcasters.

- Red Barber
- Ernie Harwell
- **Jaime Jarrín**
- **Vin Scully**

=== Associated Press Athlete of the Year ===
Presented starting in 1931 for overall athlete of the year.

- 1962 – Maury Wills
- 1963 – Sandy Koufax
- 1965 – Sandy Koufax
- 1988 – Orel Hershiser
- 2024 – Shohei Ohtani
- 2025 – Shohei Ohtani

=== Hickok Belt ===
Presented to the top professional athlete of the year in the U.S., from 1950 to 1976.

- 1962 – Maury Wills
- 1963 – Sandy Koufax
- 1965 – Sandy Koufax
- 2024 – Shohei Ohtani

=== California Sports Hall of Fame ===
Recognizes athletes, coaches, and members of sports media who have made a "lasting impression to California sports" Since 2007.

**Los Angeles Dodgers in the California Sports Hall of Fame**
No.	Name	Position(s)	Seasons	Notes
2	Tommy Lasorda	P Manager	1954–1955; 1976–1996	
6	Steve Garvey	1B	1969–1982	
34	Fernando Valenzuela	P	1980–1990	
42	Jackie Robinson	2B	1947–1956	Grew up in Pasadena, attended UCLA
—	Vin Scully	Broadcaster	1950–2016	
—	Frank Jobe	Team physician	1968–2008	Performed the first Tommy John surgery

== League leaders ==
=== Hitting ===
==== NL batting average champions ====
- 1892 – Dan Brouthers (.335)
- 1914 – Jake Daubert (.329)
- 1913 – Jake Daubert (.350)
- 1918 – Zack Wheat (.335)
- 1932 – Lefty O'Doul (.368)
- 1941 – Pete Reiser (.343)
- 1944 – Dixie Walker (.357)
- 1949 – Jackie Robinson (.342)
- 1953 – Carl Furillo (.344)
- 1962 – Tommy Davis (.346)
- 1963 – Tommy Davis (.326)
- 2021 – Trea Turner (.328)

==== Doubles ====
- 1941 – Pete Reiser (39)
- 1970 – Wes Parker (47)
- 2019 – Corey Seager (44)
- 2022 – Freddie Freeman (47)
- 2023 – Freddie Freeman (59)

==== Home runs ====
- 1924 – Jack Fournier (27)
- 1941 – Dolph Camilli (34)
- 1956 – Duke Snider (43)
- 2001 – Shawn Green (49)
- 2004 – Adrián Beltré (48)
- 2011 – Matt Kemp (39)
- 2024 – Shohei Ohtani (54)

==== Runs scored ====
- 1890 – Hub Collins (148)
- 1899 – Willie Keeler (140)
- 1941 – Pete Reiser (117)
- 1943 – Arky Vaughan (112)
- 1945 – Eddie Stanky (128)
- 1949 – Pee Wee Reese (132)
- 1953 – Duke Snider (132)
- 1954 – Duke Snider (120)
- 1955 – Duke Snider (126)
- 1991 – Brett Butler (112)
- 2011 – Matt Kemp (115)
- 2022 – Mookie Betts & Freddie Freeman (117)
- 2024 – Shohei Ohtani (134)
- 2025 – Shohei Ohtani (146)

==== Runs batted in ====
- 1919 – Hy Myers (73)
- 1941 – Dolph Camilli (120)
- 1945 – Dixie Walker (124)
- 1953 – Roy Campanella (142)
- 1955 – Duke Snider (136)
- 1962 – Tommy Davis (153)
- 2011 – Matt Kemp (126)
- 2014 – Adrián González (116)
- 2024 – Shohei Ohtani (130)

==== Stolen bases ====
- 1892 – John Montgomery Ward (88)
- 1903 – Jimmy Sheckard (67)
- 1942 – Pete Reiser (20)
- 1943 – Arky Vaughan (20)
- 1946 – Pete Reiser (34)
- 1947 – Jackie Robinson (29)
- 1949 – Jackie Robinson (37)
- 1952 – Pee Wee Reese (30)
- 1960 – Maury Wills (50)
- 1961 – Maury Wills (35)
- 1962 – Maury Wills (104)
- 1963 – Maury Wills (40)
- 1964 – Maury Wills (53)
- 1965 – Maury Wills (94)
- 1975 – Davey Lopes (77)
- 1976 – Davey Lopes (63)
- 2014 – Dee Gordon (64)
- 2021 – Trea Turner (32)

==== Triples ====
- 1898 – John Anderson (22)
- 1901 – Jimmy Sheckard (21)
- 1904 – Harry Lumley (18)
- 1907 – Whitey Alperman (16)
- 1918 – Jake Daubert (15)
- 1919 – Hy Myers (14)
- 1920 – Hy Myers (22)
- 1942 – Pete Reiser (17)
- 1945 – Luis Olmo (13)
- 1953 – Jim Gilliam (17)
- 1959 – Wally Moon & Charlie Neal (11)
- 1962 – Willie Davis & Maury Wills (10)
- 1970 – Willie Davis (16)
- 1994 – Brett Butler (9)
- 2014 – Dee Gordon (12)
- 2022 – Gavin Lux (7)

=== Pitching ===
==== E.R.A. ====
- 1924 – Dazzy Vance (2.16)
- 1928 – Dazzy Vance (2.09)
- 1930 – Dazzy Vance (2.61)
- 1957 – Johnny Podres (2.66)
- 1962 – Sandy Koufax (2.54)
- 1963 – Sandy Koufax (1.88)
- 1964 – Sandy Koufax (1.74)
- 1965 – Sandy Koufax (2.04)
- 1966 – Sandy Koufax (1.73)
- 1980 – Don Sutton (2.20)
- 1984 – Alejandro Peña (2.48)
- 2000 – Kevin Brown (2.58)
- 2011 – Clayton Kershaw (2.28)
- 2012 – Clayton Kershaw (2.53)
- 2013 – Clayton Kershaw (1.83)
- 2014 – Clayton Kershaw (1.77)
- 2015 – Zack Greinke (1.66)
- 2017 – Clayton Kershaw (2.31)
- 2019 – Hyun-jin Ryu (2.32)
- 2022 – Julio Urías (2.16)

==== Saves ====
- 1974 – Mike Marshall (21)
- 1996 – Todd Worrell (44)
- 2003 – Éric Gagné (55)
- 2017 – Kenley Jansen (41)

==== Strikeouts ====
- 1921 – Burleigh Grimes (136)
- 1922 – Dazzy Vance (134)
- 1923 – Dazzy Vance (197)
- 1924 – Dazzy Vance (262)
- 1925 – Dazzy Vance (221)
- 1926 – Dazzy Vance (140)
- 1927 – Dazzy Vance (184)
- 1928 – Dazzy Vance (200)
- 1951 – Don Newcombe (164)
- 1959 – Don Drysdale (242)
- 1960 – Don Drysdale (246)
- 1961 – Sandy Koufax (269)
- 1962 – Don Drysdale (232)
- 1963 – Sandy Koufax (306)
- 1965 – Sandy Koufax (382) (NL record)
- 1966 – Sandy Koufax (317)
- 1981 – Fernando Valenzuela (180)
- 1995 – Hideo Nomo (236)
- 2011 – Clayton Kershaw (248)
- 2013 – Clayton Kershaw (232)
- 2015 – Clayton Kershaw (301)

==== Wins ====
- 1899 – Joe McGinnity (28)
- 1900 – Joe McGinnity (28)
- 1901 – Bill Donovan (25)
- 1921 – Burleigh Grimes (21)
- 1924 – Dazzy Vance (28)
- 1925 – Dazzy Vance (22)
- 1941 – Kirby Higbe & Whit Wyatt (22)
- 1956 – Don Newcombe (27)
- 1962 – Don Drysdale (25)
- 1963 – Sandy Koufax (25)
- 1965 – Sandy Koufax (26)
- 1966 – Sandy Koufax (27)
- 1974 – Andy Messersmith (20)
- 1986 – Fernando Valenzuela (21)
- 1988 – Orel Hershiser (23)
- 2006 – Derek Lowe & Brad Penny (16)
- 2011 – Clayton Kershaw (21)
- 2014 – Clayton Kershaw (21)
- 2017 – Clayton Kershaw (18)
- 2021 – Julio Urías (20)

== See also ==
- Baseball awards
- List of MLB awards
