= Julio Urías =

Mexican baseball player (born 1996)

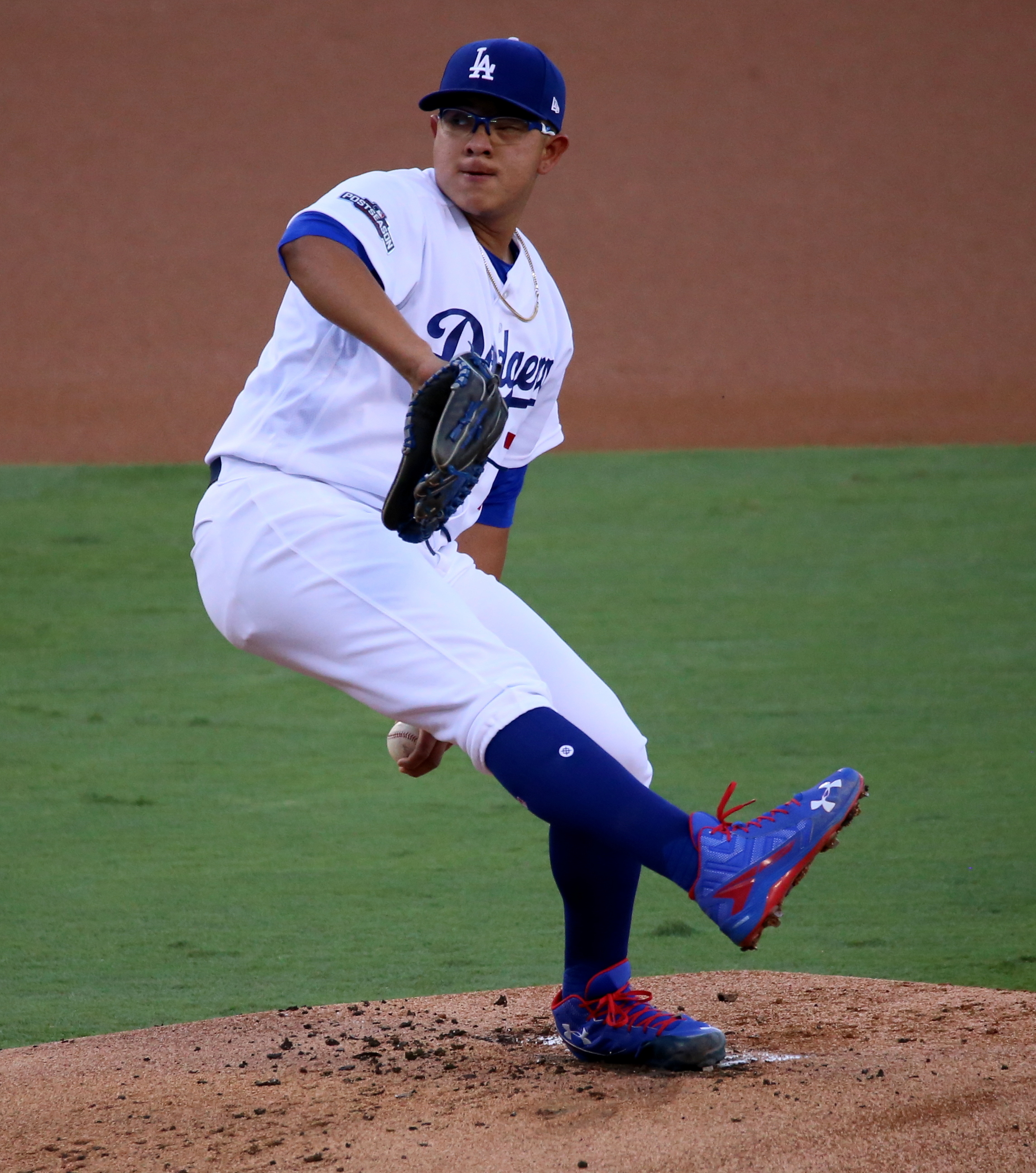
- Urías with the Los Angeles Dodgers in 2016
- Pitcher
- Born: August 12, 1996 (age 30); Culiacán, Sinaloa, Mexico
- Batted: Left Threw: Left

MLB debut
- May 27, 2016, for the Los Angeles Dodgers

Last MLB appearance
- September 1, 2023, for the Los Angeles Dodgers

MLB statistics
- Win–loss record: 60–25
- Earned run average: 3.11
- Strikeouts: 710
- Stats at Baseball Reference

Teams
- Los Angeles Dodgers (2016–2023)

Career highlights and awards
- World Series champion (2020); NL wins leader (2021); NL ERA leader (2022)
Medals
Men's baseball
Representing Mexico
World Baseball Classic
Bronze medal – third place	2023 Miami	Team

Julio César Urías Acosta (born August 12, 1996), nicknamed "El Culichi", is a Mexican former professional baseball pitcher. The Los Angeles Dodgers signed him in 2012, and he made his Major League Baseball (MLB) debut in 2016. Urías led the National League in wins in 2021 and earned run average in 2022. He was named to the All-MLB Second Team in 2021 and 2022. In September 2023, following his second arrest for domestic violence, Urías was placed on administrative leave by MLB. His contract with the Dodgers expired at the end of the season and he has not pitched professionally since then.

== Early life ==
Urías is the son of Carlos Urías and Juana Isabel Acosta. He played with the Mexico national youth team in his early teens. At age 14, Urías met Los Angeles Dodgers scout Mike Brito, who had first scouted Fernando Valenzuela in the late 1970s. In June 2012, the Dodgers discovered 15-year-old Urías at a showcase in Oaxaca, on the same scouting trip in Mexico on which they signed Yasiel Puig. The Dodgers signed him on August 12, his 16th birthday. The Dodgers paid a signing fee of US$450,000, most of which went to the Diablos Rojos del México of the Mexican League.

== Professional career ==
=== Minor leagues ===
Urías made his professional debut on May 25, 2013, for the Great Lakes Loons in the Midwest League as the youngest player in the league, striking out six batters over three shutout innings. He made a total of 18 starts and finished the season 2–0 with a 2.48 ERA, recording 67 strikeouts in 54.1 innings. He spent 2014 with the Rancho Cucamonga Quakes of the California League. In 25 appearances (20 of which were starts), he was 2–2 with a 2.36 ERA. He struck out 109 batters while walking only 37.

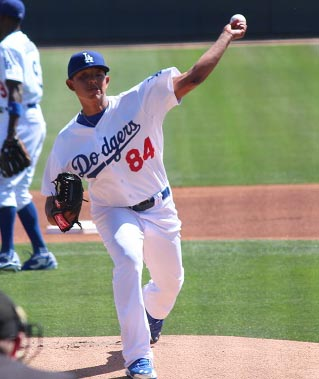
Urías pitches during spring training in 2014

Urías was selected to play for the World team at the 2014 All-Star Futures Game and was selected as the Dodgers organizational "Minor League Pitcher of the Year" for 2014. He received an invitation to attend the team's 2015 major league spring training camp. After pitching in two games, for a total of two innings and a 4.50 ERA, he was the first to be cut from the roster and was reassigned to the team's minor league camp on March 14, 2015.

Urías was ranked by MLBpipeline.com as the top left-handed pitching prospect in all of baseball entering the 2015 season. MLB.com ranked him the 8th-best prospect in baseball, and Baseball America named him the #10 prospect in 2015. The Dodgers assigned him to the AA Tulsa Drillers of the Texas League to start the 2015 season. He was 3–4 with a 2.77 ERA in 13 starts for Tulsa.

Urias was promoted to the AAA Oklahoma City Dodgers on August 31, 2015. He struggled in his first AAA action, allowing nine runs in 4 1/3 innings over two starts. He also allowed six runs, including a grand slam homer, in just one inning in his one start in the Pacific Coast League playoffs. He was again invited to attend Dodgers spring training. He was assigned to AAA to begin the season, where he was 4–1 with a 1.10 ERA in seven starts. He also had a 27-inning scoreless streak during May for Oklahoma City.

=== Los Angeles Dodgers (2016–2023) ===
==== 2016: Rookie season ====
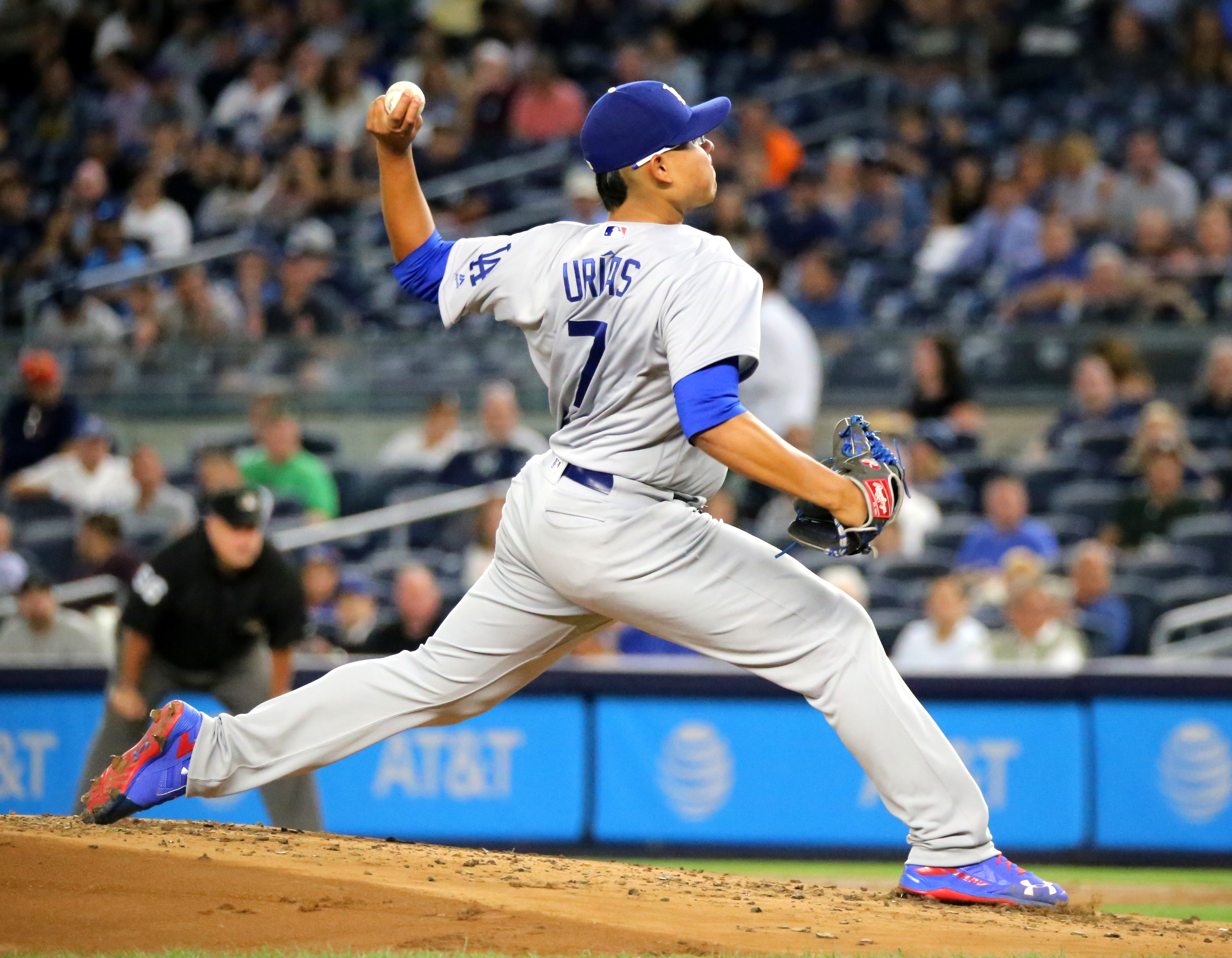
Urías pitching for the Dodgers in 2016

Urías was promoted to the Los Angeles Dodgers to make his major league debut against the New York Mets on May 27, 2016. At 19, he was the youngest starting pitcher to debut in the Majors since Félix Hernández in the 2005 season. He was also the youngest starting pitcher to debut in the West Coast portion of Dodgers history; only 18-year-old Rex Barney the 1943 Brooklyn Dodgers was younger overall. (Joe Moeller at 19 years and 55 days is the youngest LA Dodger starting pitcher). Urias struggled in his debut, lasting only 2 2/3 innings while allowing five hits, three runs and four walks. He did strike out three, including the first batter he faced, Curtis Granderson. He was optioned back to AAA after the game. Three days later, he was returned to the active roster after starter Alex Wood went on the disabled list. Urías made his second start on June 2 against the Chicago Cubs. In 5 innings pitched, he gave up 6 runs (5 earned), including 3 home runs. He allowed 8 hits, and struck out 4. He picked up his first major league win, against the Milwaukee Brewers, on June 28, 2016, when he allowed two runs on two hits in six innings. He was the first teenage Dodger pitcher to throw 100 pitches in a game since Joe Moeller in 1962. He pitched in 18 games for the Dodgers, 15 of them starts, and was 5–2 with a 3.39 ERA, 84 strikeouts and 31 walks. He led the major leagues in pickoffs, with six.

Urías pitched two innings of relief in game five of the 2016 National League Division Series, picking up the win. At 20 years, 62 days old he became the youngest Dodgers pitcher to ever pitch in the postseason. He was two weeks younger than Don Drysdale was in game four of the 1956 World Series. He was also the fourth-youngest pitcher in MLB postseason history, behind Ken Brett (1967 World Series), Bert Blyleven (1970 ALCS), and Don Gullett (1970 NLCS and 1970 World Series). He became the youngest pitcher ever to start a postseason game when he started game four of the 2016 National League Championship Series. He allowed four runs in 3 2/3 innings in the game.

==== 2017 ====
The Dodgers chose to keep Urías in extended spring training rather than having him on the opening day roster to start 2017, with the goal of limiting his innings so he would be able to pitch more later in the season. He rejoined the major league starting rotation on April 27. He made five starts for the Dodgers and was 0–2 with a 5.40 ERA. He was optioned back to the minors on May 21. In June while pitching for Triple-A Oklahoma City, Urías tore the anterior capsule in his left shoulder, which ended his 2017 season and required surgery.

==== 2018 ====
Urías spent most of the 2018 season recuperating from his injury and did not begin rehabbing in the minors until July 30. He made three appearances for the Dodgers during the regular season, pitching four scoreless innings in September. Despite that, he was added to the Dodgers roster for the 2018 NLCS and 2018 World Series. He allowed one run in 3 1/3 innings against the Milwaukee Brewers in the NLCS and one run in three innings against the Boston Red Sox in the World Series.

==== 2019: Suspension and return to rotation ====
Urías was scheduled to begin 2019 in the bullpen to reduce his innings in the early going, but injuries to Clayton Kershaw and Rich Hill led to him beginning the season in the rotation. He started four times, including a nine-strikeout game (in six innings) while allowing only one hit against the Brewers on April 18, after which he joined the bullpen. He picked up his first career save on May 6 against the Atlanta Braves.

Urías was placed on paid administrative leave on May 14 as a result of a domestic battery investigation, but was reinstated on May 21. On August 17, Urias was suspended for 20 games.

He wound up appearing in 37 games, with eight starts, and was 4–3 with a 2.49 ERA and 85 strikeouts. Balls hit against him had the lowest average exit velocity (83.2 mph) of those hit against all major league pitchers. Urías appeared in three of the five games of the NLDS against the Washington Nationals, allowing three runs to score in 3 2/3 innings and recording the loss in Game 4.

==== 2020: World Series championship ====
Urías agreed with the Dodgers on a one-year, $1 million contract for 2020, avoiding arbitration. In the pandemic-shortened 2020 season, he became a full-time starter for the Dodgers and went 3–0 with a 3.27 ERA in 11 games. Urías picked up the win in the Dodgers' first playoff game of the season, the opener of the Wild Card Series against the Milwaukee Brewers, pitching three scoreless innings (with five strikeouts) in relief of Walker Buehler. In the NLDS against the San Diego Padres, he appeared in Game 3, working five innings, including one unearned run, to pick up the series-clinching win. In the NLCS against the Atlanta Braves he was the winning pitcher in the two games in which he appeared. Urías started Game 3 and allowed one run on three hits in five innings and then pitched the final three innings of the series-deciding Game 7, allowing no runners to reach base. Urías then started Game 4 of the 2020 World Series against the Tampa Bay Rays, pitching 4.2 innings and allowing two runs on four hits while striking out nine. In Game 6, Urìas entered in the 7th inning and pitched 2 1/3 scoreless innings to record the save and was on the mound when the Dodgers clinched their championship.

==== 2021: NL wins leader ====
Urías agreed with the Dodgers on a one-year, $3.6 million, contract for 2021, avoiding arbitration. Starting more than 20 games in a season for the first time in his career, Urías enjoyed his best season to date. He ended his 2021 campaign starting in 32 games, pitching 185 2/3 innings with 195 strikeouts, a 2.96 ERA, and a 20–3 record, the best in the league. He became the first pitcher in the National League since Max Scherzer in 2016 to collect 20 wins in a season, which was the most in the majors in 2021 and only the fourth 20-win season by a Mexican-born pitcher.

Urías started the second game of the 2021 NLDS against the San Francisco Giants, and allowed only one run on three hits in five innings with five strikeouts to pick up the win. He also pitched in the deciding fifth game of the series, entering in the third inning after the Dodgers used two openers (technically one opener and one reliever, as only one pitcher per team can "open" a game). He pitched four innings and allowed one run on three hits as the Dodgers won the series. He next appeared in a relief role in Game 2 of the 2021 NLCS against the Atlanta Braves, where he allowed two runs to score on three hits in only one inning, blowing the lead in a game the Dodgers lost. He then started, three days later, in Game 4 of the series, where he struggled, allowing five runs on eight hits in five innings to record the loss.

==== 2022: NL ERA leader ====
Urías signed a one-year, $8 million contract with the Dodgers for 2022, in his third season of salary arbitration.

Continuing on his excellent form from the previous season, Urías kept his place on the Dodgers starting rotation. Despite owning a 3–4 record at the end of May after 10 starts, he compiled a solid 2.89 ERA, 42 strikeouts, and only 12 walks in that span. He went 3–1 in 5 June starts, achieving a 2.20 ERA for the month, and lowering his overall ERA down to 2.64. He tossed a combined 12 innings in which he only allowed one earned run and two in total, in two victories against the Cleveland Guardians and the Atlanta Braves. Despite his solid numbers, Urías was not elected to the All-Star Game. Following the All-Star break, he went 4–0 in five starts in July, achieving a 2.71 ERA for the month.

To start August, he pitched a combined 18 innings in three wins against the Giants, Twins, and Brewers, in which he only allowed a single run: a Gilberto Celestino single that brought in Gio Urshela against Minnesota on August 9. He ultimately went 4–1 in the month, with a superb 0.90 ERA to go with 34 strikeouts in 30 innings pitched. For the season, Urías finished 17–7 with 166 strikeouts and led the National League in ERA with 2.16.

==== 2023: End of his time with the Dodgers ====
Urías signed a one-year, $14.25 million contract with the Dodgers for 2023, in his final season of salary arbitration. He played for the Mexico national baseball team in the 2023 World Baseball Classic, making two starts and allowing seven earned runs in nine innings while striking out 10. He was named the Dodgers opening day starter for 2023, allowing two runs in six innings in the game. He went on the injured list in mid-May because of a hamstring injury which kept him out of action until July 1.

Urías made 21 starts for the Dodgers in 2023, with a 11–8 record and a 4.60 ERA. On September 6, MLB placed him on administrative leave in response to his arrest in a domestic violence case. His contract expired at the end of the season, making him a free agent.

On March 21, 2025, a year and a half after he last played, MLB announced that they were formally suspending Urías through the 2025 All-Star break for a second violation of their policy against domestic violence and sexual assault.

== Pitching style ==
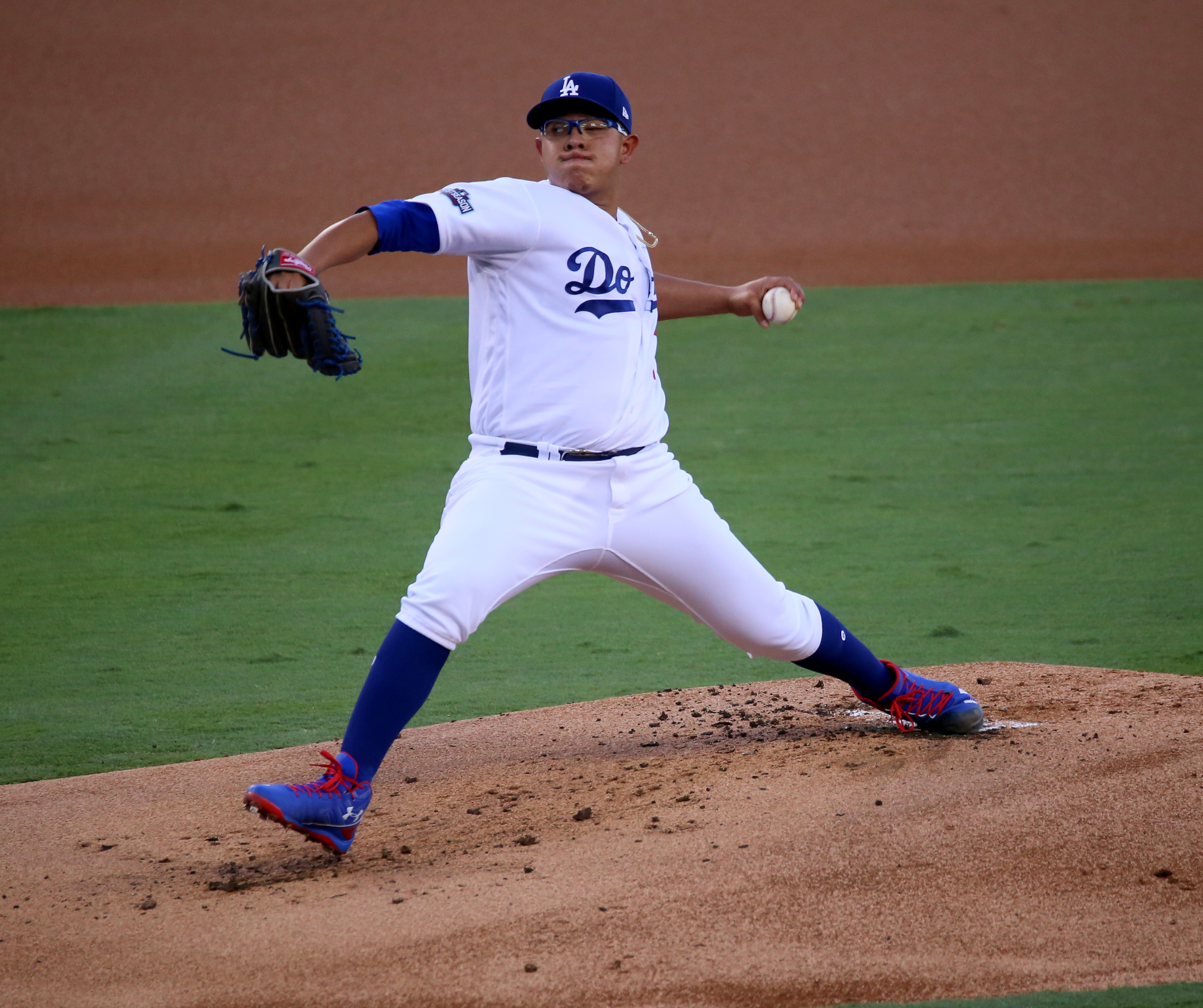
Urías delivers a pitch during Game 4 of the 2016 NLCS

Urías' primary pitch is a fastball with a typical velocity between 90 and 95 miles per hour, peaking at 97. He also throws a low-80s changeup, curveball, and slider. His curveball initially had primarily horizontal movement, resembling a slurve. During the 2016 season, he altered his grip to add vertical movement. He began using the slider in 2015. Urías is also known for his pickoff move, leading the major leagues in his rookie season with six pickoffs.

== Personal life ==
Urías underwent three surgeries on his left eye during his youth to remove a benign mass. As a result, his left eye is nearly closed, but he is able to see through it. When asked about his eye condition, Urías, a devout Roman Catholic, said, "That's how God works. He gave me a bad left eye but a good left arm." On May 19, 2015, he had elective surgery to correct the condition.

=== Domestic violence arrests ===
In May 2019, Urías was arrested for domestic battery. Los Angeles City Attorney Mike Feuer deferred prosecution on the condition that Urías participate in a hearing, not commit acts of violence against anyone, and complete a 52-week domestic violence counseling program in person. For this incident the Dodgers organization suspended him for 20 games for violating the MLB's domestic violence policy.

On September 3, 2023, Urías was arrested for felony domestic violence, following an incident at a LAFC soccer match that he attended. A witness observed Urias assaulting a woman in the area just outside BMO Stadium and notified police. He was taken into custody without incident, processed, and released after posting bail. The Dodgers organization suspended him through the 2025 All Star break. Urias was placed on administrative leave by Major League Baseball on September 6 while they conducted an investigation of the incident for violating the leagues domestic violence policy twice ultimately leading to him being a free agent and has not played any sort of baseball since. On January 9, 2024, the Los Angeles County District Attorney's office announced it would not pursue felony charges against Urías. However, on April 9, the Los Angeles City Attorney charged Urías with five misdemeanor counts related to the incident including one count of spousal battery, two counts of domestic battery involving dating relationship, one count of false imprisonment, and one count of assault. On May 1, he pled "no contest" to one misdemeanor domestic battery charge as part of a plea-deal that dropped the other charges. He was sentenced to 36 months of probation and 30 days of community service and ordered to complete a 52-week domestic violence counseling course. On September 19, 2024, a video was released out of the 2023 domestic violence incident that was taken by a witness.

== See also ==
- List of Major League Baseball players from Mexico
- List of World Series starting pitchers
- Los Angeles Dodgers award winners and league leaders
