= Dolph Camilli =

American baseball player (1907–1997)

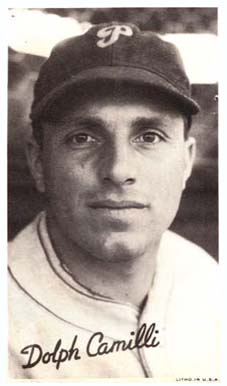
- First baseman
- Born: April 23, 1907; San Francisco, California, U.S.
- Died: October 21, 1997 (aged 90); San Mateo, California, U.S.
- Batted: Left Threw: Left

MLB debut
- September 9, 1933, for the Chicago Cubs

Last MLB appearance
- September 23, 1945, for the Boston Red Sox

MLB statistics
- Batting average: .277
- Home runs: 239
- Runs batted in: 950
- Stats at Baseball Reference

Teams
- Chicago Cubs (1933–1934); Philadelphia Phillies (1934–1937); Brooklyn Dodgers (1938–1943); Boston Red Sox (1945)

Career highlights and awards
- 2× All-Star (1939, 1941); NL MVP (1941); NL home run leader (1941); NL RBI leader (1941)

Adolph Louis Camilli (April 23, 1907 – October 21, 1997) was an American first baseman in Major League Baseball who spent most of his career with the Philadelphia Phillies and Brooklyn Dodgers. He was named the National League's Most Valuable Player in 1941 after leading the league in home runs and runs batted in as the Dodgers won the pennant for the first time since 1920. He was the ninth National League player to hit 200 career home runs, and held the Dodgers franchise record for career home runs from 1942 to 1953. His son Doug was a major league catcher in the 1960s. His brother, who boxed under the name Frankie Campbell, died of a cerebral hemorrhage following a 1930 match with Max Baer.

== Early life ==
Camilli was born on April 23, 1907, in San Francisco, where he was raised. He attended Sacred Heart Cathedral Preparatory.

== Minor league career ==
Camilli had an eight-year minor league career before making his Major League debut with the Chicago Cubs at the end of the 1933 season.

In 1926, Camilli played 68 games with the Class C Logan Collegians of the Utah-Idaho League, with a .311 batting average and 10 home runs, 20 doubles and seven triples. That same season, he also played for the Double-A San Francisco Seals of the Pacific Coast League, batting .312, with seven home runs and 25 doubles in 81 games. Camilli began the 1927 season with the Seals, but did not meet expectations during the first part of the season, and was benched for two weeks in May. He hit only .244 with two home runs in 81 games, and spent the rest of the season with Logan, batting .311 in 47 games.

In 1928, he played for the Salt Lake City Bees in the Utah-Idaho League, batting .333 with 20 home runs in 117 games. From 1929 to 1933, he played with the Sacramento Senators in the Pacific Coast League. During that five-year period, his seasonal batting averages ranged from .275 to .322, and home runs ranged from 12 to 20.

== Major league career ==
Camilli did not play a full season of Major League Baseball until he was 27-years old. Although only 5 ft 10 in (1.78 m) 185 lb (83 kg), the left-handed hitting Camilli hit 23 or more home runs in eight consecutive seasons, between the ages of 28 and 35, often near the NL lead in home runs during those years. His free-swinging style also led to numerous strikeouts. In his 1934 rookie season, he tied Hack Wilson's modern National League record of 94 strikeouts, and in 1935 he set a new league mark with 113. He struck out over 100 times in three more seasons (1938, 1939 and 1941), leading all Major League Players in strikeouts in 1939 and 1941; yet was also the NL's Most Valuable Player in 1941. He was in the top 25 voting for NL Most Valuable Player seven times.

=== Chicago Cubs and Philadelphia Phillies ===
In August 1933, the Sacramento Senators sold Camilli's contract rights to the Chicago Cubs for $24,000. He started 16 games at first base for the Cubs, batting .224 with two home runs that season. In 1934, he had started 30 of the 32 games in which he appeared for the Cubs, batting .275 with four home runs, when he was traded to the Philadelphia Phillies in June for Don Hurst. New York Giants Hall of Fame first baseman, and manager, Bill Terry, who coveted Camilli for the Giants, said the Phillies trade for Camilli was one of the smartest moves he had seen during his entire tenure in baseball.

During his three full seasons with the Phillies, 1935 to 1937, he hit 25 or more home runs a season, batting a career-high .339 and leading the National League in on-base percentage in 1937. In 1936 and 1937, his WAR (wins above replacement) was 10th in the NL (6.0) and seventh (6.1), respectively.

In 102 games with the Phillies in 1934, Camilli hit .265 with 12 home runs and 68 runs batted in (RBI). Overall that season, he hit .267 with 16 home runs and 87 RBIs. He led the National League in strikeouts (94). In 1935, his first full season with the Phillies, he hit .261, with 25 home runs, 83 RBIs and 88 runs scored. He also struck out more than any other Major League player (113). He finished 24th in NL Most Valuable Player voting. On May 30, 1935, he recorded the last out of Babe Ruth's career.

In 1936, he hit .315 with 28 home runs, 102 RBIs, 106 runs scored and 116 bases on balls. He had a .441 on base percentage and 1.018 OPS (on base plus slugging). He was second in the NL in home runs and OPS behind Hall of Fame outfielder Mel Ott (33 and 1.036), second in walks behind Arky Vaughan's 118, fourth in on base percentage and total bases (306), tied for fifth in RBIs and eighth in runs scored. He was tied for 16th in NL Most Valuable Player voting.

In 1935 and 1936, he played in 156 and 151 games, respectively. In 1937, he played in 131 games. He hit a career-high .339, with 27 home runs, 80 RBIs, 101 runs scored and 90 bases on balls. His .446 on base percentage led the NL, and his 1.034 OPS was second only to Hall of Fame outfielder Joe Medwick (1.056). He was third in home runs behind Medwick and Ott (31), second in walks and tied for eighth in RBIs.

In addition to his hitting, Camilli was considered a good fielding first baseman. After leading the National League's first basemen in errors in 1934 (18) and all Major League first basemen with 20 in 1935 (tied with Phil Cavarretta), in 1937 he only had eight errors; and his .994 fielding percentage led the National League. Even in 1935, his .987 fielding percentage was tied for fourth in the NL, and he led all NL first basemen in putouts. He was likewise fourth again in fielding percentage in 1936 (.988), and once more led all NL first basemen in putouts. On July 30, 1937, he played the entire game at first base in a 1–0 win over the Cincinnati Reds without recording a put out. Later in his career (1939), he led all Major League first basemen in assists.

In early March 1938, Camilli was holding out for a higher salary offer from the Phillies, as he had done at times in the past. Rather than pay him, the Phillies made it known Camilli was available to other teams for sale or trade.

=== Brooklyn Dodgers ===
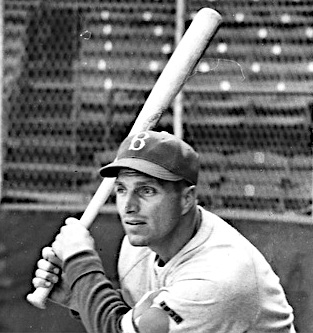
Camilli as a member of the Brooklyn Dodgers, circa 1938.

From 1933 to 1937, the Brooklyn Dodgers never had a winning record and never finished above fifth place. The team once had been the most profitable in MLB, but in 1936 and 1937 attendance had declined significantly. In March 1938, the Dodgers new general manager Larry MacPhail began the work of turning the Dodgers into a winning team again by paying the then staggering sum of $60,000 to the Phillies for Camilli, along with sending rookie Ed Morgan to the Phillies. It has also been reported the sum paid was $75,000. McPhail hoped the Camilli transaction would spark a change in the team's image from lovable losers to solid contenders; and put an end to the "running-around-in-circles" that had marked Dodgers leadership in the preceding years.

In his first season with the Dodgers, Camilli hit .251 with 24 home runs, 100 RBIs, 106 runs scored, a .393 on base percentage and .879 OPS. He tied Jimmie Foxx and Hank Greenberg with a Major League leading 119 walks. He was third in the NL in runs scored, fourth in home runs, sixth in RBIs, and seventh in on base percentage, slugging percentage and OPS. He had a .995 fielding percentage at first base, in a season where the top fielding percentage among all Major League first basemen was .996. The Dodgers still had a losing season, finishing in seventh place (only ahead of the Phillies who lost 105 games that season without Camilli).

In 1939, the Dodgers had a winning season (84–69) and came in third place. Camilli hit .290 with 26 home runs, 104 RBIs, 105 runs, 110 walks, a .409 on base percentage and a .933 OPS. He had a .990 fielding percentage at first base (fifth in the NL). Camilli was first in the NL in walks, third in home runs, and fourth in on base percentage, slugging percentage, OPS, RBIs, runs and WAR (6.4). Camilli led all Major League first basemen with 129 assists. He also struck out a Major League leading 107 times, and was the first MLB player to have three 100-strikeout seasons. Camilli was selected to the All-Star team for the first time, and was 12th in NL Most Valuable Player voting.

The 1940 Dodgers improved to 88–65, and finished in second place. Camilli hit .287, with 23 home runs, 96 RBIs, 92 runs, 89 walks, a .397 on base percentage and .926 OPS; along with a .992 fielding percentage. He was second in the NL in OPS, third in slugging percentage, fourth in on base percentage and home runs, seventh in RBIs, eighth in WAR (5.3) and ninth in runs. His .992 fielding percentage was third in the NL. He was again 12th in NL Most Valuable Player voting.

In 1941, Camilli was the National League's Most Valuable Player, and the Dodgers won the NL pennant for the first time since 1920 (when they were the Brooklyn Robins). He led the NL with career highs of 34 home runs and 120 RBIs. He hit .285, with 94 runs, 104 walks, a .407 on base percentage, .556 slugging percentage, .962 OPS, a career-high 6.9 WAR and 115 strikeouts (the most of any Major League player that year). He was also second in the NL in OPS and slugging percentage (only behind teammate Pete Reiser) and walks, third in on base percentage, fourth in WAR, and sixth in runs. Camilli was selected to his second All-Star Game. In the 1941 World Series, the Dodgers lost to the New York Yankees in five games. Camilli batted .167 in the World Series with one RBI, one run and a double in 18 at bats. In 1941, he also surpassed Rabbit Maranville's National League career strikeout record of 756.

In 1942, Camilli hit .252, with 26 home runs, 109 RBI, 89 runs, 97 walks and an .843 OPS. He was the Dodgers' team captain. He finished tied for second in the National League in home runs with Johnny Mize (behind Ott again) and second in RBIs, just one behind Mize. He was also third in walks and seventh in OPS. That year, he also broke Zack Wheat's club record of 131 career home runs. Gil Hodges surpassed his final Dodgers' total of 139 in 1953, and Duke Snider broke Camilli's mark for left-handed batters later the same year.

At the end of the 1942 season, McPhail retired as general manager to serve as a lieutenant colonel in the United States Army, and was replaced by Branch Rickey. Camilli struggled at the beginning of the 1943 season, and Rickey traded him, among other higher salaried players in light of the difficulties the team faced during World War II. Camilli was hitting .246 with six home runs when the Dodgers traded him and Johnny Allen to the New York Giants on July 31, 1943 for Bill Lohrman, Bill Sayles and Joe Orengo. The 36-year old Camilli refused to report to the Dodgers' hated rivals. Camilli said years later, "'I hated the Giants. This was real serious; this was no put-on stuff. Their fans hated us, and our fans hated them. . . . I said nuts to them, and I quit".

=== End of playing career ===
In 1944 and the beginning of 1945, he was a player-manager for the Oakland Oaks of the Pacific Coast League. In 113 games for the Oaks in 1944, he hit .289 with 14 home runs and 60 RBIs. He played in 11 games, with six hits in 17 at bats for the Oaks in 1945, and pitched five innings in an Oaks win, before joining the Boston Red Sox on June 15, 1945. He started 52 games for the Red Sox, batting .212 with two home runs and 19 RBIs in his last season as a player.

== Legacy and honors ==
In a 12-season career, Camilli posted a .277 batting average with 239 home runs and 950 runs batted in during 1,490 games played. After leading the National League in errors in both 1934 and 1935, and setting a record with three errors in one inning in 1935, he improved his defense and later led the league in assists and fielding percentage once each. He recorded a .990 fielding percentage playing every inning in his major league career at first base. He was the ninth National League player to hit 200 career home runs, and held the Dodgers franchise record for career home runs from 1942 to 1953. He also ended his career with 961 strikeouts, more than any players except Babe Ruth (1,330) and Jimmie Foxx (1,311); his National League record of 923 was broken by Gil Hodges in 1958. He is now not even in the top 400 players with the most career strikeouts (through 2025). Among his career highlights was recording the last out of Ruth's career.

Camilli was inducted into the Dodgers Hall of Fame in 1984, and recalled of his fans, "All they cared about was their family, their job and the Dodgers. And I don't know which one was the most important".

In 1993, Camilli was inducted into the Bay Area Sports Hall of Fame, along with Reggie Jackson, Al Attles and Rollie Fingers.

Dodgers manager Leo Durocher said ''Camilli was a quiet, gentle man, but he was strong as an ox".

== Manager and scout ==
In 1944, as player-manager of the Oakland Oaks, he led the team to an 86–83 record. He managed the Oaks for part of the 1945, before leaving to join the Red Sox in mid-June. He managed the Spokane Indians for part of the 1948 season. Camilli took over the Spokane team in early August when it was 10 games out of Western International League lead, and led them to the league title. In 1950, he managed the Dayton Indians to a 69–63 record. In 1953, he managed the Magic Valley Cowboys to a 48–83 record. He also served as a coach with the Sacramento Solons, until he was released after the 1955 season. It was reported at the time of his death that he had also managed the Solons.

Camilli served as a scout for the Yankees, Phillies and California Angels. He finished his professional baseball career as a spring training instructor for the California Angels.

== Personal life and death ==
In his later years he became active among those who played in the Major Leagues before 1947, at a time before there was any MLB pension plan, in seeking pensions. The most money he had ever made in a season was $24,000 and he, like all other players of his time, had to work in the offseasons to make ends meet.

Camilli's son Doug Camilli played nine years in Major League Baseball as a catcher for the Los Angeles Dodgers and Washington Senators. His son Dick Camilli played seven seasons in the minor leagues, six in the Detroit Tigers farm system, and a final year (1959) for the Milwaukee Braves Triple-A affiliate, the Sacramento Solons. His son Dolph Camilli Jr. played in the New York Yankees minor league system in 1961 and 1962. His son Bruce Camilli played three years in the Yankees' minor league system, 1961 to 1963.

Camilli's brother Francisco Camilli was a professional boxer, who fought under the name Frankie Campbell. Campbell was killed at age 26 as the result of a 1930 match against future heavyweight champion Max Baer, in San Francisco. The rules of the fight were set broadly (to keep punching as long as an opponent was standing). Baer had knocked Campbell unconscious with a series of punches under an unusual set of circumstances that had kept Campbell upright even though he could not stand on his own; and after Campell had suffered severe blows to the head earlier in the fight. Campbell died the next morning in the hospital of a double cerebral hemorrhage. Baer was originally arrested and charged with manslaughter, but the charges were later withdrawn; though Baer, the referee and both managers were suspended from working in California for one year by the state's athletic commission. Baer was traumatized by Campbell's death and was never the same person afterward. After becoming champion years later, he fought an exhibition match to raise money for Campbell's wife and son.

Camilli stayed in shape, and swam at least one mile a day even into his 80s. He died in San Mateo, California at age 90, on October 21, 1997. He had recently undergone spinal surgery and suffered from pneumonia. His first wife Ruth died in 1980, and he was survived by his second wife, Molly, seven children, 16 grandchildren and 14 great-grandchildren. He was buried at Cypress Lawn Memorial Park in Colma, California.

== See also ==
- List of athletes on Wheaties boxes
- List of Major League Baseball career home run leaders
- List of Major League Baseball annual home run leaders
- List of Major League Baseball annual runs batted in leaders
