= Toronto Blue Jays award winners and league leaders =

This is a list of award winners and league leaders for the Toronto Blue Jays of Major League Baseball.

== Individual Player Awards ==
=== All-MLB First Team ===
- 2021 - Vladimir Guerrero Jr.
- 2021 - Marcus Semien
- 2021 - Robbie Ray
- 2022 - Alek Manoah
- 2024 - Vladimir Guerrero Jr.
- 2025 - Vladimir Guerrero Jr.
- 2026 - Dylan Cease
- 2026 - Louis Varland

=== All-MLB Second Team ===
- 2020 - Hyun-jin Ryu
- 2021 - Teoscar Hernández
- 2023 - Kevin Gausman
- 2025 - Bo Bichette

=== AL Most Valuable Player Award ===
- 1987 – George Bell
- 2015 – Josh Donaldson

=== AL Cy Young Award ===
- 1996 – Pat Hentgen
- 1997 – Roger Clemens
- 1998 – Roger Clemens
- 2003 – Roy Halladay
- 2021 – Robbie Ray

=== AL BBWAA Relief Pitcher of the Year Award ===
- 2026 – Louis Varland

=== Warren Spahn Award ===
Best Left-handed Pitcher Award in Major League Baseball

- 2020 – Hyun Jin Ryu

=== Edgar Martínez Award ===
Outstanding Designated Hitter Award

- 1992 – Dave Winfield
- 1993 – Paul Molitor
- 2009 – Adam Lind

=== AL Rookie of the Year Award ===
- 1979 – Alfredo Griffin
- 2002 – Eric Hinske

=== AL Gold Glove Award ===
- Pitcher
  - R. A. Dickey (2013)
  - Marcus Stroman (2017)
  - José Berríos (2023)
- Catcher

none

- First base
  - Vladimir Guerrero Jr. (2022)
  - Ty France (2025)
- Second base
  - Roberto Alomar [5] (1991–95)
  - Orlando Hudson (2005)
  - Marcus Semien (2021)
- Shortstop
  - Tony Fernández [4] (1986–89)
- Third base
  - Kelly Gruber (1990)
  - Matt Chapman (2023)
- Outfield
  - Jesse Barfield [2] (1986–87)
  - Devon White [5] (1991–95)
  - Shawn Green (1999)
  - Vernon Wells [3] (2004–06)
  - Kevin Kiermaier (at CF) (2023)
  - Daulton Varsho (at CF) (2024)
- Team
  - 2023
  - 2024
  - 2026

=== Wilson Defensive Player of the Year Award by Position ===
• CF Kevin Pillar (2015)

See explanatory note at Atlanta Braves award winners and league leaders.

=== AL Silver Slugger Awards ===
Best offensive player at each position

- DH
  - Dave Winfield (1992)
  - Paul Molitor (1993)
  - José Canseco (1998)
  - Adam Lind (2009)
  - George Springer (2025)
- Catcher
  - Alejandro Kirk (2022)
- First baseman
  - Fred McGriff (1989)
  - Carlos Delgado [3] (1999, 2000, 2003)
  - Vladimir Guerrero Jr. [2] (2021, 2024)
- Second baseman
  - Dámaso García (1982)
  - Roberto Alomar (1992)
  - Aaron Hill (2009)
  - Marcus Semien (2021)
- Shortstop

none

- Third baseman
  - Kelly Gruber (1990)
  - Josh Donaldson [2] (2015, 2016)
- Outfielders
  - Lloyd Moseby (1983)
  - George Bell [3] (1985, 1986, 1987)
  - Jesse Barfield (1986)
  - Joe Carter [2] (1991, 1992)
  - Shawn Green (1999)
  - Vernon Wells (2003)
  - José Bautista [3] (2010, 2011, 2014)
  - Teoscar Hernández [2] (2020, 2021)

=== Silver Bat Award ===
AL Batting Average Leader

- 1993 – John Olerud

=== AL Hank Aaron Award ===
Awarded to the most outstanding offensive player

- 2000 – Carlos Delgado
- 2010 – José Bautista
- 2011 – José Bautista
- 2015 – Josh Donaldson
- 2021 – Vladimir Guerrero Jr.

=== AL Manager of the Year ===
- 1985 – Bobby Cox

=== AL Comeback Player of the Year ===
- 2009 – Aaron Hill

=== ALCS Most Valuable Player ===
- 1992 – Roberto Alomar
- 1993 – Dave Stewart
- 2025 – Vladimir Guerrero Jr

=== World Series Most Valuable Player ===
- 1992 – Pat Borders
- 1993 – Paul Molitor

=== All-Star Game Most Valuable Player ===
- 2021 – Vladimir Guerrero Jr.

=== DHL Hometown Heroes (2006) ===
- Joe Carter — voted by MLB fans as the most outstanding player in Blue Jays franchise history. Criteria included: on-field performance, leadership quality and character value

=== The Sporting News American League Player of the Year ===
- 1987 – George Bell
- 2000 – Carlos Delgado
- 2015 – Josh Donaldson

=== The Sporting News American League Pitcher of the Year ===
- 1982 – Dave Stieb
- 1987 – Jimmy Key
- 1996 – Pat Hentgen
- 1997 – Roger Clemens
- 1998 – Roger Clemens
- 2003 – Roy Halladay

=== Baseball America All-Rookie Team ===
See: Baseball America#Baseball America All-Rookie Team

- 2011 – Brett Lawrie (3B)

== Team award ==
- 1992 – William Harridge Trophy (American League champion)
- 1992 – Commissioner's Trophy (World Series)
- 1993 – William Harridge Trophy (American League champion)
- 1993 – Commissioner's Trophy (World Series)
- 1994 (1993 Toronto Blue Jays) – Outstanding Team ESPY Award
- 2012 – Allan H. Selig Award for Philanthropic Excellence
- 2020 — Allan H. Selig Award for Philanthropic Excellence
- 2025 — William Harridge Trophy (American League champion)

== Other achievements ==
=== National Baseball Hall of Fame inductees ===
See: Toronto Blue Jays § Baseball Hall of Famers

=== Retired numbers ===
See: Toronto Blue Jays#Retired numbers

=== Level of Excellence ===
See: Toronto Blue Jays#Level of Excellence

=== All-Star Game Selections ===
Year	Player(s)
2026	Dylan Cease (P), Ernie Clement (2B), Vladimir Guerrero Jr. (1B), Louis Varland (P)
2025	Vladimir Guerrero Jr. (1B), Alejandro Kirk (C)
2024	Vladimir Guerrero Jr. (1B)
2023	Bo Bichette (SS), Kevin Gausman (P), Vladimir Guerrero Jr. (1B), Whit Merrifield (2B), Jordan Romano (P)
2022	Santiago Espinal (2B), Vladimir Guerrero Jr. (1B), Alejandro Kirk (C), Alek Manoah (P), Jordan Romano (P), George Springer (OF)
2021	Bo Bichette (SS), Vladimir Guerrero Jr. (1B), Teoscar Hernández (OF), Marcus Semien (2B)
2019	Marcus Stroman (P)
2018	J. A. Happ (P)
2017	Justin Smoak (1B), Roberto Osuna (P)
2016	Josh Donaldson (3B), Edwin Encarnación (DH), Marco Estrada (P), Aaron Sanchez (P), Michael Saunders (OF)
2015	José Bautista (OF), Josh Donaldson (3B), Russell Martin (C)
2014	José Bautista (OF), Mark Buehrle (P), Edwin Encarnación (1B)
2013	José Bautista (OF), Brett Cecil (P), Steve Delabar (P), Edwin Encarnación (DH)
2012	José Bautista (OF)
2011	José Bautista (OF), Ricky Romero (P)
2010	José Bautista (OF), John Buck (C), Vernon Wells (OF)
2009	Aaron Hill (2B), Roy Halladay (P)
2008	Roy Halladay (P)
2007	Alex Ríos (OF)
2006	Troy Glaus (3B), Roy Halladay (P), B. J. Ryan (P), Alex Ríos (OF), Vernon Wells (OF)
2005	Roy Halladay (P), Shea Hillenbrand (DH)
2004	Ted Lilly (P)
2003	Carlos Delgado (1B), Roy Halladay (P), Vernon Wells (OF)
2002	Roy Halladay (P)
2001	Paul Quantrill (P)
2000	Tony Batista (3B), Carlos Delgado (1B), David Wells (P)
1999	Tony Fernández (3B), Shawn Green (OF)
1998	Roger Clemens (P)
1997	Roger Clemens (P), Pat Hentgen (P)
1996	Joe Carter (OF)
1995	Roberto Alomar (2B)
1994	Roberto Alomar (2B), Joe Carter (OF), Pat Hentgen (P), Paul Molitor (DH)
1993	Roberto Alomar (2B), Joe Carter (OF), Pat Hentgen (P), Paul Molitor (DH), John Olerud (1B), Duane Ward (P), Devon White (OF)
1992	Roberto Alomar (2B), Joe Carter (OF), Juan Guzmán (P)
1991	Roberto Alomar (2B), Joe Carter (OF), Jimmy Key (P)
1990	George Bell (OF), Kelly Gruber (3B), Dave Stieb (P)
1989	Tony Fernández (SS), Kelly Gruber (3B)
1988	Dave Stieb (P)
1987	George Bell (OF), Tony Fernández (SS), Tom Henke (P)
1986	Jesse Barfield (OF), Tony Fernández (SS), Lloyd Moseby (OF)
1985	Dámaso García (2B), Jimmy Key (P), Dave Stieb (P), Ernie Whitt (C)
1984	Damaso Garcia (2B), Alfredo Griffin (SS), Dave Stieb (P)
1983	Dave Stieb (P)
1982	Jim Clancy (P)
1981	Dave Stieb (P)
1980	Dave Stieb (P)
1979	Dave Lemanczyk (P)
1978	Roy Howell (3B)
1977	Ron Fairly (OF)

=== BBWAA Neil MacCarl Award ===
This award is presented by the BBWAA to the Toronto Blue Jays Player of the Year.

Year	Player	Position(s)	Statistics	Notes
1977	Bob Bailor	SS/OF	.310/.335/.403 BA/OBP/SLG, 5 HR, 32 RBI	Blue Jays inaugural season
1978	Bob Bailor (2)	OF	.264/.310/.338 BA/OBP/SLG, 1 HR, 52 RBI	
1979	Alfredo Griffin	SS	.287/.333/.364 BA/OBP/SLG, 2 HR, 31 RBI	Co-Rookie of the Year
1980	John Mayberry	1B	.248/.349/.473 BA/OBP/SLG, 30 HR, 82 RBI	
1981	Dave Stieb	SP	11–10 W–L, 3.19 ERA, 89 SO	All-Star, Only pitcher to win the award
1982	Dámaso García	2B	.310/.338/.399 BA/OBP/SLG, 5 HR, 42 RBI	Silver Slugger
1983	Lloyd Moseby	CF	.315/.376/.499 BA/OBP/SLG, 18 HR, 81 RBI	Silver Slugger
1984	Dave Collins	OF	.318/.366/.444 BA/OBP/SLG, 15 3B, 44 RBI, 60 SB	
1985	Jesse Barfield	RF	.289/.369/.536 BA/OBP/SLG, 27 HR, 84 RBI	
1986	Jesse Barfield (2)	RF	.289/.368/.559 BA/OBP/SLG, 40 HR, 108 RBI	All-Star, Gold Glove, Silver Slugger
1987	George Bell	LF	.308/.352/.608 BA/OBP/SLG, 47 HR, 134 RBI	AL MVP, All-Star, Silver Slugger
1988	Fred McGriff	1B	.282/.376/.552 BA/OBP/SLG, 34 HR, 82 RBI	
1989	George Bell (2)	LF	.297/.330/.458 BA/OBP/SLG, 18 HR, 104 RBI	
1990	Kelly Gruber	3B	.274/.330/.512 BA/OBP/SLG, 31 HR, 118 RBI	All-Star, Gold Glove, Silver Slugger
1991	Roberto Alomar	2B	.295/.354/.436 BA/OBP/SLG, 9 HR, 69 RBI, 53 SB	All-Star, Gold Glove
1992	Roberto Alomar (2)	2B	.310/.405/.427 BA/OBP/SLG, 8 HR, 76 RBI, 49 SB	ALCS MVP, All-Star, Gold Glove, Silver Slugger
1993	John Olerud	1B	.363/.473/.599 BA/OBP/SLG, 24 HR, 107 RBI, 54 2B	All-Star, Silver Bat
1994	Joe Carter	OF	.271/.317/.524 BA/OBP/SLG, 27 HR, 103 RBI	All-Star
1995	Roberto Alomar (3)	2B	.300/.354/.449 BA/OBP/SLG, 13 HR, 66 RBI	All-Star, Gold Glove
1996	Joe Carter (2)	OF	.253/.306/.475 BA/OBP/SLG, 30 HR, 107 RBI	All-Star
1997	Carlos Delgado	1B	.262/.350/.528 BA/OBP/SLG, 30 HR, 91 RBI	
1998	Carlos Delgado (2)	1B	.292/.385/.592 BA/OBP/SLG, 38 HR, 115 RBI	
1999	Shawn Green	RF	.309/.384/.588 BA/OBP/SLG, 42 HR, 123 RBI	All-Star, Gold Glove, Silver Slugger
2000	Carlos Delgado (3)	1B	.344/.470/.664 BA/OBP/SLG, 41 HR, 137 RBI, 57 2B	All-Star, Silver Slugger, Hank Aaron Award
2001	Carlos Delgado (4)	1B	.279/.408/.540 BA/OBP/SLG, 39 HR, 102 RBI	
2002	Carlos Delgado (5)	1B	.277/.406/.549 BA/OBP/SLG, 33 HR, 108 RBI	
2003	Carlos Delgado (6)	1B	.302/.426/.593 BA/OBP/SLG, 42 HR, 145 RBI	All-Star, Silver Slugger
2004	Vernon Wells	CF	.272/.337/.472 BA/OBP/SLG, 23 HR, 67 RBI	Gold Glove
2005	Vernon Wells (2)	CF	.269/.320/.463 BA/OBP/SLG, 28 HR, 97 RBI	Gold Glove
2006	Vernon Wells (3)	CF	.303/.357/.542 BA/OBP/SLG, 32 HR, 106 RBI	All-Star, Gold Glove
2007	Alex Rios	RF	.297/.354/.498 BA/OBP/SLG, 24 HR, 85 RBI	All-Star
2008	Vernon Wells (4)	CF	.300/.343/.496 BA/OBP/SLG, 20 HR, 78 RBI	
2009	Aaron Hill	2B	.286/.330/.499 BA/OBP/SLG, 36 HR, 108 RBI	All-Star, Silver Slugger, Comeback Player of the Year
2010	José Bautista	RF	.260/.378/.617 BA/OBP/SLG, 54 HR, 124 RBI	All-Star, Silver Slugger, Hank Aaron Award
2011	José Bautista (2)	RF	.302/.447/.608 BA/OBP/SLG, 43 HR, 103 RBI	All-Star, Silver Slugger, Hank Aaron Award
2012	Edwin Encarnación	1B	.280/.384/.557 BA/OBP/SLG, 42 HR, 110 RBI	
2013	Edwin Encarnación (2)	1B	.272/.370/.534 BA/OBP/SLG, 36 HR, 104 RBI	All-Star
2014	José Bautista (3)	RF	.286/.403/.524 BA/OBP/SLG, 35 HR, 103 RBI	All-Star, Silver Slugger
2015	Josh Donaldson	3B	.297/.371/.568 BA/OBP/SLG, 41 HR, 123 RBI	AL MVP, All-Star, Silver Slugger, Hank Aaron Award
2016	Josh Donaldson (2)	3B	.284/.404/.549 BA/OBP/SLG, 37 HR, 99 RBI	All-Star, Silver Slugger
2017	Josh Donaldson (3)	3B	.270/.385/.559 BA/OBP/SLG, 33 HR, 78 RBI	
2018	Justin Smoak	1B	.242/.350/.457 BA/OBP/SLG, 25 HR, 77 RBI	
2019	Lourdes Gurriel Jr.	OF	.277/.327/.541 BA/OBP/SLG, 20 HR, 50 RBI	
2020	Teoscar Hernández	OF	.289/.340/.579 BA/OBP/SLG, 16 HR, 34 RBI	Silver Slugger
2021	Vlad Guerrero Jr.	1B	.311/.401/.601 BA/OBP/SLG, 48 HR, 111 RBI	All-Star, Silver Slugger, Hank Aaron Award
2022	Vlad Guerrero Jr. (2)	1B	.274/.339/.480 BA/OBP/SLG, 32 HR, 97 RBI	All-Star, Gold Glove
2023	Bo Bichette	SS	.306/.339/.475 BA/OBP/SLG, 20 HR, 73 RBI	All-Star
2024	Vlad Guerrero Jr. (3)	1B	.323/.396/.544 BA/OBP/SLG, 30 HR, 103 RBI	All-Star, Silver Slugger
2025	George Springer	DH/OF	.309/.399/.560 BA/OBP/SLG, 32 HR, 84 RBI	Silver Slugger

=== BBWAA Toronto Chapter Blue Jays Awards Pitcher of the Year Award ===
Year	Player
2007	Roy Halladay
2008	Roy Halladay
2009	Roy Halladay
2010	Ricky Romero
2011	Ricky Romero
2012	Casey Janssen
2013	Casey Janssen
2014	Mark Buehrle
2015	Marco Estrada
2016	Aaron Sanchez
2017	Marcus Stroman
2018	J.A. Happ
2019	Ken Giles
2020	Hyun Jin Ryu
2021	Robbie Ray
2022	Alek Manoah
2023	Kevin Gausman
2024	José Berríos
2025	Kevin Gausman

=== World Baseball Classic MVP ===
- 2017 – Marcus Stroman (P)

== Minor league system ==
=== AAA International League Rookie of the Year ===
- 1989 – Francisco Cabrera
- 1994 – Shawn Green

=== AAA International League Player of the Year ===
- 1991 – Derek Bell
- 2000 – Chad Mottola
- 2015 – Matt Hague

=== AAA International League Most Valuable Pitcher Award ===
- 1985 – Tom Henke
- 1989 – Alex Sanchez
- 1998 – Shannon Withem

=== AAA Pacific Coast League Most Valuable Player Award ===
- 2009 – Randy Ruiz
- 2010 – J.P. Arencibia

== American League Offensive Leaders ==
=== AL Home Runs Leaders ===
- 1986 – Jesse Barfield
- 1989 – Fred McGriff
- 2010 – José Bautista
- 2011 – José Bautista
- 2021 – Vladimir Guerrero Jr.

=== AL RBI Leader ===
- 1987 – George Bell
- 2003 – Carlos Delgado
- 2015 – Josh Donaldson
- 2016 – Edwin Encarnación

=== AL Runs Scored Leader ===
- 2015 – Josh Donaldson
- 2021 – Vladimir Guerrero Jr.

=== AL Bases on Balls Leader ===
- 2011 – José Bautista
- 2015 – José Bautista

=== AL Singles Leader ===
- 1986 – Tony Fernández

=== AL Doubles Leader ===
- 1993 – John Olerud
- 1999 – Shawn Green
- 2000 – Carlos Delgado
- 2003 – Vernon Wells (co-leader)

=== AL Triples Leaders ===
- 1980 – Alfredo Griffin (co-leader)
- 1984 – Dave Collins (co-leader) & Lloyd Moseby (co-leader)

=== AL Extra-Base Hits Leader ===
- 1987 – George Bell
- 2015 – Josh Donaldson

=== At-Bats Leader ===
- 1986 – Tony Fernández

=== AL Total Bases Leader ===
- 1987 – George Bell

=== AL OPS Leader ===
- 1989 – Fred McGriff

=== AL Games Played Leaders ===
- 1979 – Rick Bosetti (co-leader)
- 1982 – Alfredo Griffin (co-leader)
- 1983 – Alfredo Griffin (co-leader)
- 1986 – Tony Fernández

=== AL Sacrifice Flies Leader ===
- 1989 – George Bell
- 2015 – Edwin Encarnación (co-leader) & Josh Donaldson (co-leader)

=== AL At-Bats per Strikeout Leader ===
- 1978 – Bob Bailor

=== AL Outs Leaders ===
- 1980 – Alfredo Griffin
- 1986 – Tony Fernández

== American League Pitching Leaders ==
=== MLB Triple Crown ~ Pitching ===
MLB Leader in ERA, Wins & Strike Outs

- 1997 – Roger Clemens
- 1998 – Roger Clemens

=== AL Earned Run Average Leaders ===
- 1985 – Dave Stieb
- 1987 – Jimmy Key
- 1996 – Juan Guzmán
- 1997 – Roger Clemens
- 1998 – Roger Clemens
- 2015 – David Price
- 2016 – Aaron Sanchez
- 2021 – Robbie Ray

=== AL Adjusted ERA Leader ===
- 1997 – Roger Clemens
- 1998 – Roger Clemens

=== AL Wins Leaders ===
- 1992 – Jack Morris
- 1997 – Roger Clemens
- 1998 – Roger Clemens
- 2000 – David Wells
- 2003 – Roy Halladay

=== AL Strikeouts Leader ===
- 1997 – Roger Clemens
- 1998 – Roger Clemens
- 2008 – A.J. Burnett
- 2021 – Robbie Ray

=== AL Winning Percentage Leader ===
- 1984 – Doyle Alexander
- 1987 – Jeff Musselman
- 1993 – Juan Guzmán
- 2006 – Roy Halladay
- 2016 – Aaron Sanchez

=== AL Innings Pitched Leaders ===
- 1982 – Dave Stieb
- 1984 – Dave Stieb
- 1995 – David Cone (17 starts with Toronto Blue Jays 13 with New York Yankees)
- 1996 – Roger Clemens
- 1997 – Roger Clemens (co-leader)
- 1997 – Pat Hentgen (co-leader)
- 2002 – Roy Halladay
- 2003 – Roy Halladay
- 2008 – Roy Halladay
- 2021 – Robbie Ray

=== AL WHIP Leaders ===
- 1987 – Jimmy Key
- 1996 – Juan Guzmán
- 1997 – Roger Clemens
- 2008 – Roy Halladay
- 2021 – Robbie Ray

=== AL Batting Average Against Leaders ===
- 1984 – Dave Stieb
- 1985 – Dave Stieb
- 1987 – Jimmy Key
- 1996 – Juan Guzman
- 1998 – Roger Clemens
- 2015 – Marco Estrada
- 2016 – Marco Estrada
- 2026 – Dylan Cease

=== AL Saves Leaders ===
- 1987 – Tom Henke
- 1993 – Duane Ward (co-leader)

=== AL Appearance Leaders ===
- 1987 – Mark Eichhorn
- 1991 – Duane Ward
- 2001 – Paul Quantrill
- 2003 – Trever Miller
- 2007 – Scott Downs (co-leader)
- 2022 – Adam Cimber
- 2026 – Mason Fluharty

=== AL Games Started Leaders ===
- 1982 – Jim Clancy
- 1984 – Jim Clancy (co-leader)
- 1994 – Juan Guzmán
- 1997 – Pat Hentgen (co-leader)
- 2000 – David Wells
- 2003 – Roy Halladay
- 2008 – A.J. Burnett (co-leader)
- 2021 – Robbie Ray (co-leader)
- 2021 – José Berríos (co-leader)

=== AL Complete Games Leaders ===
- 1982 – Dave Stieb
- 1996 – Pat Hentgen
- 1997 – Roger Clemens (co-leader)
- 1997 – Pat Hentgen (co-leader)
- 1999 – David Wells
- 2000 – David Wells
- 2003 – Roy Halladay (co-leader)
- 2005 – Roy Halladay
- 2007 – Roy Halladay
- 2008 – Roy Halladay
- 2009 – Roy Halladay

=== AL Shutouts Leaders ===
- 1982 – Dave Stieb
- 1996 – Pat Hentgen (co-leader)
- 1997 – Roger Clemens (co-leader)
- 1997 – Pat Hentgen (co-leader)
- 2003 – Roy Halladay (co-leader)
- 2008 – Jesse Litsch (co-leader)
- 2009 – Roy Halladay

=== AL Losses Leaders ===
- 1979 – Phil Huffman
- 1981 – Luis Leal (co-leader)
- 1998 – Juan Guzmán (22 starts with Blue Jays, 11 with Baltimore Orioles)

=== AL Hits Allowed/9IP Leaders ===
- 1984 – Dave Stieb
- 1985 – Dave Stieb
- 1987 – Jimmy Key
- 1996 – Juan Guzmán
- 1998 – Roger Clemens
- 2015 – Marco Estrada
- 2016 – Marco Estrada

=== AL Strikeouts/9IP Leader ===
- 1998 – Roger Clemens
- 2008 – A. J. Burnett
- 2026 – Dylan Cease

=== AL Walks/9IP Leader ===
- 1989 – Jimmy Key
- 2000 – David Wells
- 2009 – Roy Halladay
- 2014 – Mark Buehrle

=== AL Home Runs Allowed Leader ===
- 1977 – Jerry Garvin

=== AL Walks Allowed Leader ===
- 1980 – Jim Clancy
- 1995 – Al Leiter
- 2004 – Miguel Batista (co-leader)

=== AL Hits Allowed Leaders ===
- 1982 – Dave Stieb
- 1995 – Pat Hentgen
- 2003 – Roy Halladay

=== AL Earned Runs Allowed Leaders ===
- 1977 – Dave Lemanczyk (co-leader)
- 1984 – Jim Clancy
- 1995 – Pat Hentgen
- 2000 – Chris Carpenter
- 2003 – Cory Lidle (co-leader)

=== AL Hit Batsmen Leaders ===
- 1981 – Dave Stieb (co-leader)
- 1983 – Dave Stieb
- 1984 – Dave Stieb
- 1986 – Dave Stieb
- 1989 – Dave Stieb
- 2014 – R.A. Dickey
- 2021 – Alek Manoah
- 2022 – Alek Manoah

=== AL Batters Faced Leaders ===
- 1982 – Dave Stieb
- 1996 – Pat Hentgen
- 1997 – Pat Hentgen
- 2003 – Roy Halladay
- 2008 – Roy Halladay

=== AL Games Finished Leader ===
- 1987 – Tom Henke
- 1993 – Duane Ward

=== American League Youngest Player ===
- 1981 – Fred Manrique
- 2015 – Roberto Osuna

=== American League Oldest Player ===
- 1987 – Phil Niekro
- 2012 – Omar Vizquel
- 2015 – LaTroy Hawkins
- 2016 – R. A. Dickey

== See also ==
- Baseball awards
- List of Major League Baseball awards
- Canadian Baseball Hall of Fame

== Footnotes ==
World Series Champions
Preceded by: Minnesota Twins; 1991	1992 & 1993	Succeeded by : Atlanta Braves; 1995
American League Champions
Preceded by: Minnesota Twins; 1991	1992 & 1993	Succeeded by : Cleveland Indians; 1995
Preceded by: New York Yankees; 2024	2025	Succeeded by: incumbent
American League Eastern Division Champions
Preceded by: Detroit Tigers; 1984	1985	Succeeded by : Boston Red Sox; 1986
Preceded by: Boston Red Sox; 1988	1989	Succeeded by : Boston Red Sox; 1990
Preceded by: Boston Red Sox; 1990	1991 – 1993	Succeeded by : Boston Red Sox; 1995
Preceded by: Baltimore Orioles; 2014	2015	Succeeded by: Boston Red Sox; 2016
Preceded by: New York Yankees; 2024	2025	Succeeded by: Tampa Bay Rays; 2026
