= Aaron Hill (baseball) =

American baseball player (born 1982)

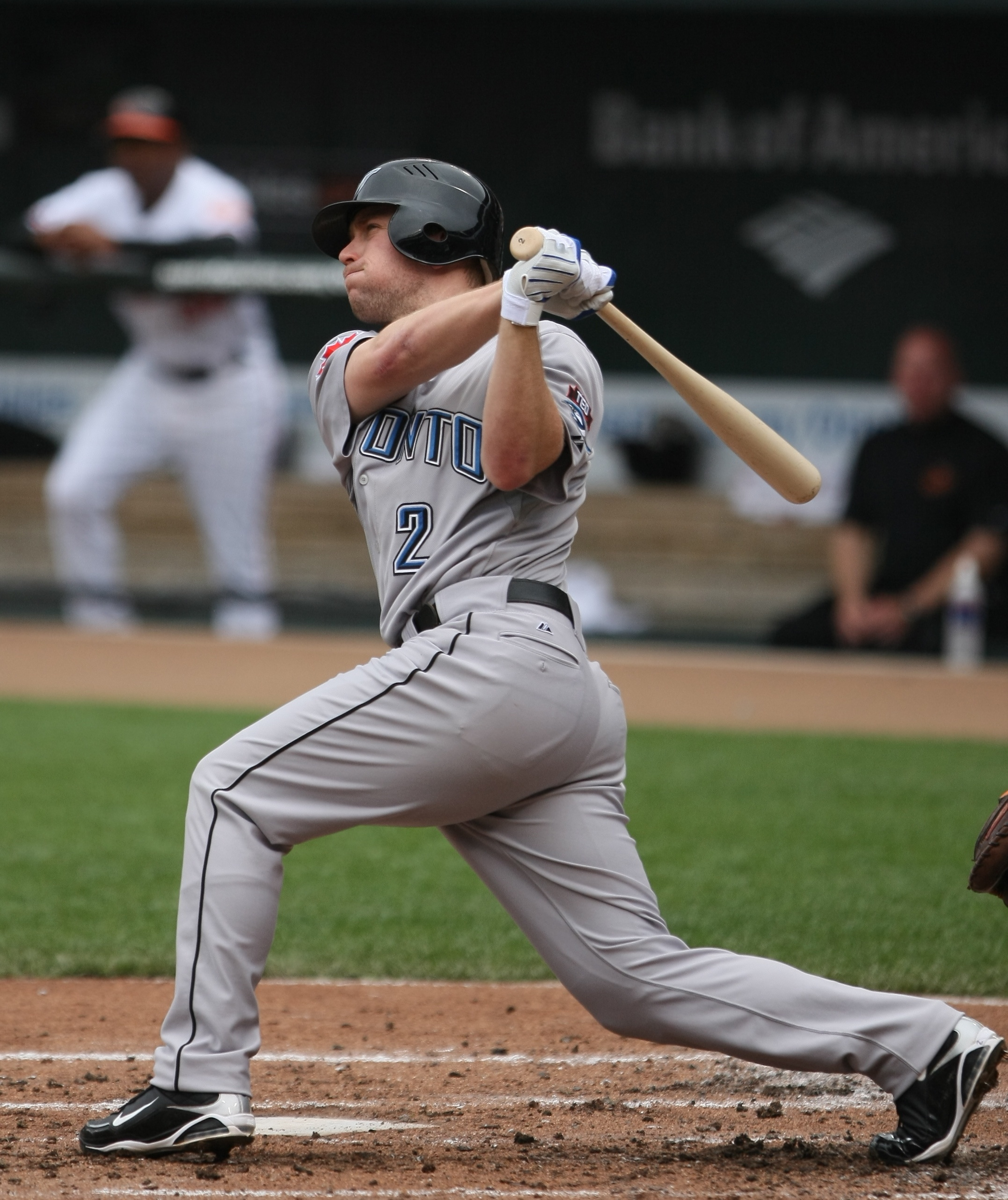
- Hill with the Toronto Blue Jays in 2009
- Second baseman
- Born: March 21, 1982 (age 44); Visalia, California, U.S.
- Batted: Right Threw: Right

MLB debut
- May 20, 2005, for the Toronto Blue Jays

Last MLB appearance
- June 23, 2017, for the San Francisco Giants

MLB statistics
- Batting average: .266
- Home runs: 162
- Runs batted in: 695
- Stats at Baseball Reference

Teams
- Toronto Blue Jays (2005–2011); Arizona Diamondbacks (2011–2015); Milwaukee Brewers (2016); Boston Red Sox (2016); San Francisco Giants (2017)

Career highlights and awards
- All-Star (2009); 2× Silver Slugger Award (2009, 2012); AL Comeback Player of the Year (2009)

Aaron Walter Hill (born March 21, 1982) is an American former professional baseball second baseman. Hill played in Major League Baseball (MLB) for the Toronto Blue Jays, Arizona Diamondbacks, Milwaukee Brewers, Boston Red Sox, and San Francisco Giants.

The Blue Jays selected Hill in the first round (13th overall) of the 2003 MLB draft and made his MLB debut with them in 2005. Hill was an All-Star in 2009. He is one of only three players in MLB history to hit for the cycle twice in one season, the others being Babe Herman (1931) and Christian Yelich (2018). He won a Silver Slugger Award in both the National League and the American League, the first player to do so in MLB history.

== Early life ==
At age 15, Hill and friends were participating in a soccer tournament in Park City, Utah. While on their way to a round of golf, a college student narrowly missed Hill's car and slammed into his mother's car following behind him. Hill's mother, Vicki, was killed as a result.

== College career ==
Hill was originally drafted by the Anaheim Angels in the seventh round (200th overall) of the 2000 MLB draft. Hill turned down the offer, opting to attend Louisiana State University and play for the varsity Tigers baseball team. While at LSU, Hill posted a career .335 batting average with 23 home runs and 150 RBIs. In 2001, he played collegiate summer baseball with the Wareham Gatemen of the Cape Cod Baseball League, and was named a league all-star and the playoff MVP of Wareham's league championship team.

== Professional career ==
=== Toronto Blue Jays ===
Hill was Toronto's first draft pick (13th overall) in the 2003 MLB draft, and he made his major league debut on May 20, 2005, against the Washington Nationals, after being called up from the minor leagues a day earlier as an injury replacement for Corey Koskie. Hill would finish the game 2-for-4, and he recorded an RBI triple off Nationals pitcher Claudio Vargas for his first career hit as the Blue Jays won, 6–1. Although he was brought up as a shortstop, Hill appeared as a third baseman, a designated hitter, and as a second baseman during the course of the season. He finished the 2005 season with a .274 batting average, .348 OBP, and 25 doubles in 361 at-bats. After the trade of Orlando Hudson to the Arizona Diamondbacks, Hill became the starting second baseman for the Blue Jays in 2006, but was moved back to shortstop mid-season after the demotion of Russ Adams. After experiencing defensive struggles at shortstop, he was then moved back to second base, with John McDonald taking over at shortstop.

On May 29, 2007, in a game at home against the New York Yankees with Andy Pettitte pitching, Hill became only the second player in Blue Jays history to accomplish a "straight steal" of home.

Hill won a Fielding Bible Award at second base for his fielding excellence in 2007.

On April 4, 2008, Hill agreed to a four-year, $12 million deal that included a club option that could have run through the 2014 season. The contract would have been worth as much as $38 million if Toronto kept Hill in the fold for all seven years of the deal.

On May 29, Hill suffered a Grade II concussion in a collision with teammate David Eckstein during a game against the Oakland Athletics. Hill missed the remainder of the season.

Hill returned from his concussion during spring training. On July 5, 2009, Hill was selected by managers and players to take part in the All-Star Game in St. Louis. Hill finished the 2009 season with 37 doubles, 36 home runs, 108 runs batted in, and a batting average of .286 in 158 games. After the season, Hill received the AL Comeback Player of the Year Award. He was voted the Blue Jays Player of the Year. He was also honored with his second Fielding Bible Award.

Prior to the first game of the 2011 season, the Blue Jays announced that they had declined the three option years on Hill's contract. Hill was placed on the 15-day disabled list on April 24, retroactive to April 20, with a strained hamstring.

=== Arizona Diamondbacks ===
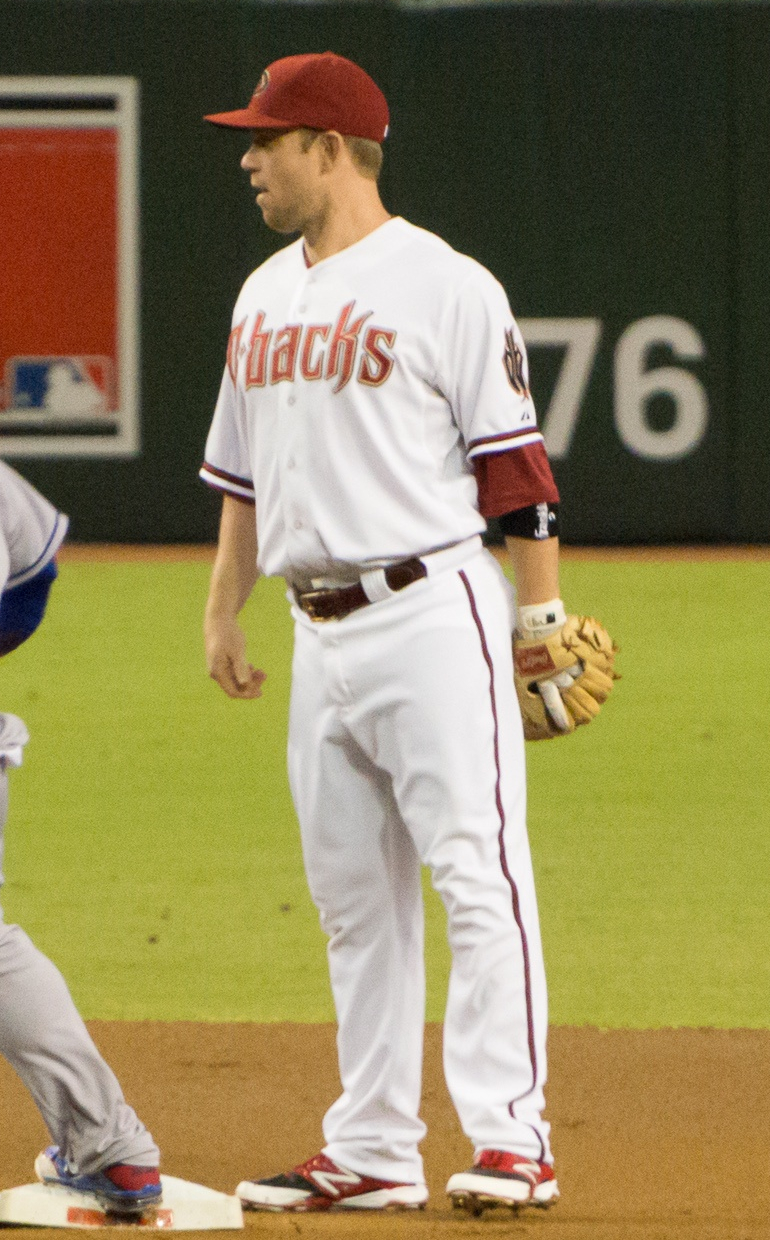
Hill with the Arizona Diamondbacks

On August 23, 2011, Hill and John McDonald were traded to the Arizona Diamondbacks in exchange for second baseman Kelly Johnson. Hill hit his first home run as a Diamondback on August 28 against the San Diego Padres, a two-run shot to right field off starter Cory Luebke.

In Game 4 of the 2011 NLDS, Hill hit his first postseason home run. The Diamondbacks would, however, lose the division series to the Milwaukee Brewers in 5 games.

After the 2011 season, the Diamondbacks resigned Hill to a two-year, $11 million contract extension.

On April 7, 2012, Hill, who got moved up in the order to the #2 spot, went 2-for-4 with 3 RBI and two home runs against the Giants in the first and second innings, both off of Madison Bumgarner. This came after going 0-for-4 on Opening Day while hitting eighth. The D-Backs went on to win 5–4.

On June 18, 2012, Hill hit for the cycle against the Seattle Mariners. On June 29, 2012, Hill again hit for the cycle against the Milwaukee Brewers, becoming the first player to hit for the cycle twice in one season since Babe Herman in 1931 for the Brooklyn Robins and the first modern-era player to do so in the same month (John Reilly hit cycles a week apart in 1883).

=== Milwaukee Brewers ===
On January 30, 2016, Hill was traded to the Milwaukee Brewers along with Chase Anderson, Isan Diaz, and cash considerations for Jean Segura and Tyler Wagner. On May 7, 2016, Hill had a career day at the plate hitting three home runs and driving in seven runs. His home runs included a game-tying home run in the eighth inning and a go-ahead grand slam in the tenth inning. Hill had only hit three home runs in his previous 82 games at the time.

=== Boston Red Sox ===
On July 7, 2016, the Brewers traded Hill to the Boston Red Sox for Aaron Wilkerson and Wendell Rijo.

=== San Francisco Giants ===
On February 17, 2017, Hill signed a minor league contract with the San Francisco Giants. Through 80 plate appearances, Hill managed just a .132 batting average with a home run, 7 RBI, and a strikeout to walk ratio of 13/11. He was designated for assignment on June 24, and was released five days later.

== Awards ==
- 2001–01 Collegiate Baseball Freshman All-American
- 2002–02 United States National Team Member
- 2003 – Southeastern Conference Player of the Year
- 2003 – Baseball America First-Team All-American
- 2003 – Collegiate Baseball Second-Team All-American
- 2003 – USA Today Second-Team All-American
- 2003 – ABCA Second-Team All-American
- 2003 – ABCA First-Team All-South Region
- 2003 – NCAA Baton Rouge Regional All-Tournament Team
- 2003 – SEC All-Tournament Team
- 2003 – Short Season All-Star Team (Baseball America)
- 2003 – Prospect of the year (New York–Penn League – A)
- 2003 – New York–Penn League All-Star Team (A) (Shortstop)
- 2004 – Eastern League All-Star Team (AA) (Shortstop)
- 2004 – MVP of All-Star Futures Game
- 2007 – Fielding Bible Award at second base
- 2009 – representative of American League at 2009 MLB All-Star Game
- 2009 – American League 2009 Comeback Player of the Year
- 2009 – American League second baseman Silver Slugger Award
- 2009 – Fielding Bible Award at second base

== See also ==
- Arizona Diamondbacks award winners and league leaders
- Toronto Blue Jays award winners and league leaders
- List of Major League Baseball annual assists leaders
- List of Major League Baseball career assists leaders
- List of Major League Baseball career double plays leaders
- List of Major League Baseball career games played as a second baseman leaders
- List of Major League Baseball players to hit for the cycle
- List of Silver Slugger Award winners at second base

Achievements
Preceded by Scott Hairston; Himself	Hitting for the cycle June 18, 2012; June 29, 2012	Succeeded by Himself; Adrián Beltré
