= Aaron Sanchez (baseball) =

American baseball player (born 1992)

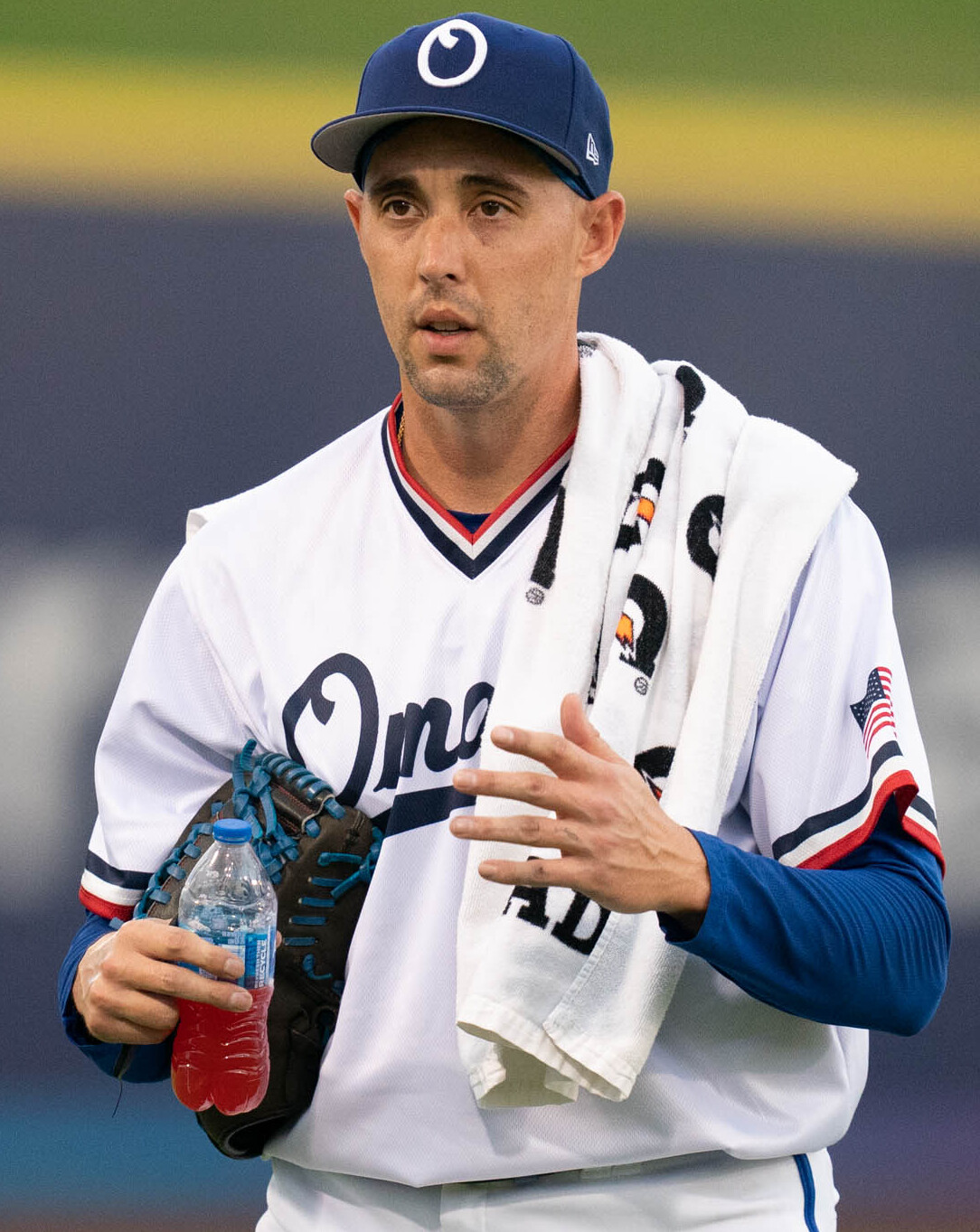
- Sanchez with the Omaha Storm Chasers in 2026

Free agent
- Pitcher
- Born: July 1, 1992 (age 34); Barstow, California, U.S.
- Bats: Right Throws: Right

MLB debut
- July 23, 2014, for the Toronto Blue Jays

MLB statistics (through 2022 season)
- Win–loss record: 38–38
- Earned run average: 4.16
- Strikeouts: 541
- Stats at Baseball Reference

Teams
- Toronto Blue Jays (2014–2019); Houston Astros (2019); San Francisco Giants (2021); Washington Nationals (2022); Minnesota Twins (2022)

Career highlights and awards
- All-Star (2016); AL ERA leader (2016); Pitched a combined no-hitter (August 3, 2019)

Aaron Jacob Sanchez (born July 1, 1992) is an American professional baseball pitcher who is a free agent. He has previously played in Major League Baseball (MLB) for the Toronto Blue Jays, Houston Astros, San Francisco Giants, Washington Nationals, and Minnesota Twins. He was drafted by the Blue Jays in the first round of the 2010 Major League Baseball draft and made his MLB debut in 2014. He was an All-Star in 2016 and led the American League in earned run average that season. Toronto traded him Houston in 2019, and he pitched the first six innings of a combined no-hitter in his first start for Houston.

== Early life ==
Sanchez was born in Barstow, California, to Lynn Shipley (née Gesky). She left Aaron's biological father, Frank Sanchez, while pregnant with him. Lynn later married Mike Shipley, who was drafted in the fourth round of the 1976 Major League Baseball draft by the California Angels. Shipley's pitching career ended when he suffered a left shoulder injury; he then took a coaching position at Barstow Community College.

Sanchez attended Barstow High School, where he posted a 7–0 win–loss record, 0.73 earned run average (ERA), and 104 strikeouts in 57 2/3 innings pitched. He also batted .403 with five home runs.

== Baseball career ==
=== Toronto Blue Jays ===
==== Minor leagues ====
The Toronto Blue Jays selected Sanchez in the first round, with the 34th selection overall, of the 2010 Major League Baseball draft. He spent the 2010 season with the Gulf Coast League Blue Jays and the Auburn Doubledays of the New York–Penn League, posting a combined record of 0–3 with a 2.16 ERA and 37 strikeouts through 10 starts. In 2011, Sanchez split time with the Bluefield Blue Jays of the Appalachian League and the Vancouver Canadians of the Northwest League, compiling a record of 3–3 with an ERA of 5.30 and 56 strikeouts through 14 appearances, 9 of which were starts. Sanchez spent the 2012 season with the Single-A Lansing Lugnuts, pitching to an 8–5 record, 2.49 ERA, and 97 strikeouts in 90 1/3 innings.

On January 29, 2013, Sanchez was named number 35 on MLB's Top 100 Prospects list. On July 26, 2013, Sanchez was ranked number 24 on MLB's revised Top 100 Prospects list, and the number 1 prospect in the Blue Jays organization. He spent the 2013 minor league season with the Advanced-A Dunedin Blue Jays, posting a 4–5 win–loss record, 3.34 ERA, and 75 strikeouts in 86 1/3 innings. He played for the Salt River Rafters of the Arizona Fall League after the minor league season ended, and posted a 1.16 ERA in 6 starts for the team.

In February 2014, Sanchez was ranked as the 32nd best prospect in baseball by Baseball America. He attended 2014 spring training and was sent to the minor league camp on March 22. Sanchez went to Montreal with the Blue Jays for a two-game exhibition series on March 28 and 29 against the New York Mets and was the pitcher of record in the second game. In 2014 spring training, Sanchez pitched to a 2–0 record with a 0.00 ERA. He started the 2014 season with the Double-A New Hampshire Fisher Cats, and was promoted to the Triple-A Buffalo Bisons on June 12. He struggled with control, issuing 17 walks in 32 1/3 Triple-A innings, and on July 17, it was announced that he would be moved to the bullpen. On July 22, he was called up to the Major League club.

==== 2014–2015 ====
On July 22, 2014, it was announced that Sanchez had been promoted to the Toronto Blue Jays to pitch out of the bullpen. He made his debut on July 23, pitching 2 innings and recording 2 strikeouts against the Boston Red Sox. On July 27, Sanchez earned his first Major League win, pitching 2 innings against the New York Yankees. On August 30, he recorded his first major league save, pitching 2 innings and preserving a 2–0 lead over the Yankees. Sanchez made 24 appearances for the Blue Jays in 2014, and posted a 2–2 record with a 1.09 ERA, 27 strikeouts, 3 saves, and a 0.70 WHIP in 33 innings pitched.

In 2015, Sanchez was ranked by MLB as the number 3 prospect in the Blue Jays' organization, and the 44th best prospect in baseball. Heading into the season, Sanchez was expected to pitch out of the bullpen, and to compete for the closer role. After Marcus Stroman suffered a torn left ACL on March 10, Sanchez pitched in the rotation for the rest of spring training and earned the fifth starter spot to open the season. He recorded his first win as a starter on April 22, defeating the Baltimore Orioles 4–2. Sanchez pitched 5 1/3 innings and yielded two runs on two hits and seven walks with four strikeouts. In winning, he became the first Toronto pitcher to win despite issuing seven walks since Jeff Ware in 1995. On May 8, Sanchez shutout the Boston Red Sox over seven innings, recording his first quality start. The Blue Jays would win the game 7–0. On June 5, he pitched into the ninth inning against the Houston Astros and took the win, 6–2. In addition to setting a career-high in innings pitched, Sanchez did not walk a batter for the first time as a starter. After missing his next scheduled start with upper body soreness, Sanchez was placed on the disabled list on June 14, retroactive to June 6, with a strained lat muscle. On July 19, manager John Gibbons announced that, upon his return from the disabled list, Sanchez would pitch out of the bullpen. He was activated on July 25 in Seattle. Sanchez was ejected from a game against the Kansas City Royals on August 2, for hitting Alcides Escobar with a pitch after home plate umpire Jim Wolf had issued a warning in the first inning. MLB deemed it intentional, and he was suspended for 3 games on August 4. Sanchez made 11 starts in the 2015 regular season and 30 relief appearances, earning a 7–6 record, 3.22 ERA, and 61 strikeouts in 92 1/3 innings. He appeared in all five games of the Division Series against the Texas Rangers, and did not allow a run in 5 1/3 innings pitched. In the Championship Series played against the Kansas City Royals, Sanchez made four scoreless relief appearances as the Blue Jays were eliminated from the postseason in six games.

==== 2016–2019 ====
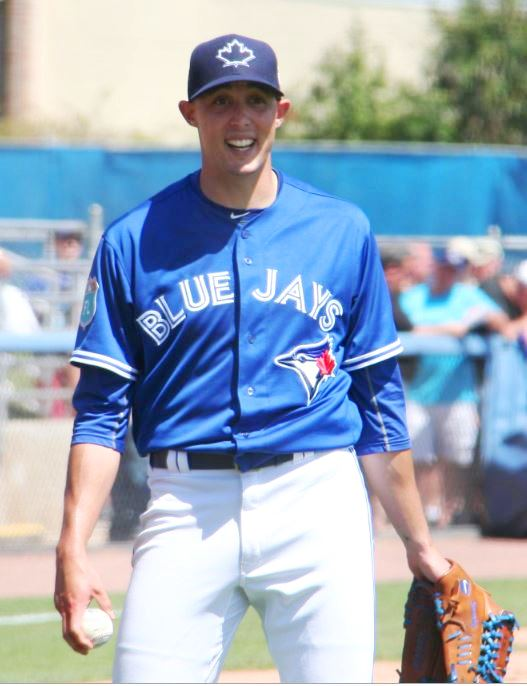
Sanchez during 2016 spring training

Sanchez stated before the start of the 2016 season that he wanted to be in the starting rotation, and had taken part in an intensive off-season workout program with teammate Marcus Stroman. He entered spring training in competition for the fifth starter role with Gavin Floyd, Drew Hutchison, and Jesse Chavez. On March 28, John Gibbons announced that Sanchez would begin the 2016 season in the starting rotation, but insinuated that he would be held to an innings-limit that may move him to the bullpen later in the season. To that point in the spring, Sanchez had thrown 20 innings, yielding only three runs and three walks while striking out 19. Sanchez carried a 9–1 record into the All-Star break, and on July 9, he was named to the 2016 All-Star Game as a replacement for Craig Kimbrel. On July 25, Sanchez won his 10th consecutive decision, defeating the San Diego Padres. In doing so, he became the first Blue Jay since Roy Halladay in 2003 to win at least 10 consecutive decisions. In his start on July 31, Sanchez threw seven innings and surpassed his career-high of 133 1/3 innings pitched, raising his 2016 total to 139 1/3.

Prior to the trade deadline, the Blue Jays acquired Francisco Liriano from the Pittsburgh Pirates, and it was widely believed that Liriano would take Sanchez's place in the starting rotation and allow Sanchez to be moved to the bullpen, to better limit his workload in the 2016 season. Several members of the team and media, including Russell Martin and Hall-of-Famer John Smoltz, expressed their desire to see Sanchez remain in the rotation. Entering August, Sanchez had an American League leading 2.71 ERA. After meeting with Sanchez, John Gibbons, and pitching coach Pete Walker, general manager Ross Atkins announced on August 4 that Sanchez would remain a starter, and that the team would use a six-man rotation. Sanchez started against the Cleveland Indians on August 20, and was optioned to the Advanced-A Dunedin Blue Jays the following day in order to skip his next start. Sanchez was recalled on August 31. He lasted just 3 2/3 innings in his start on September 11, leaving due to a blister on his pitching hand. Sanchez's next start was skipped to allow his blister to heal, and he returned to the rotation on September 21. Sanchez earned his 15th win of the season on October 2, lowering his earned run average to 3.00 and earning him the American League ERA title. The win also clinched the first AL Wild Card position. Sanchez closed the 2016 regular season with a 15–2 record, 3.00 ERA, and 161 strikeouts in 192 innings pitched. He started the third game of the Division Series against the Texas Rangers, and allowed six earned runs in 5 2/3 innings. Toronto would win the game in extra innings, 7–6, and eliminate the Rangers from the postseason for the second consecutive season. In the Championship Series, Sanchez started Game 4 and gave the Blue Jays their only win of the series, pitching six innings and allowing only two hits and one earned run to the Cleveland Indians.

On October 25, general manager Ross Atkins stated that the organization would not limit Sanchez's innings in the 2017 season. Sanchez finished seventh in voting for the 2016 American League Cy Young Award, receiving a third place vote and three fifth place votes. On January 25, 2017, Sanchez was announced as the cover athlete for the Canadian version of MLB The Show 17.

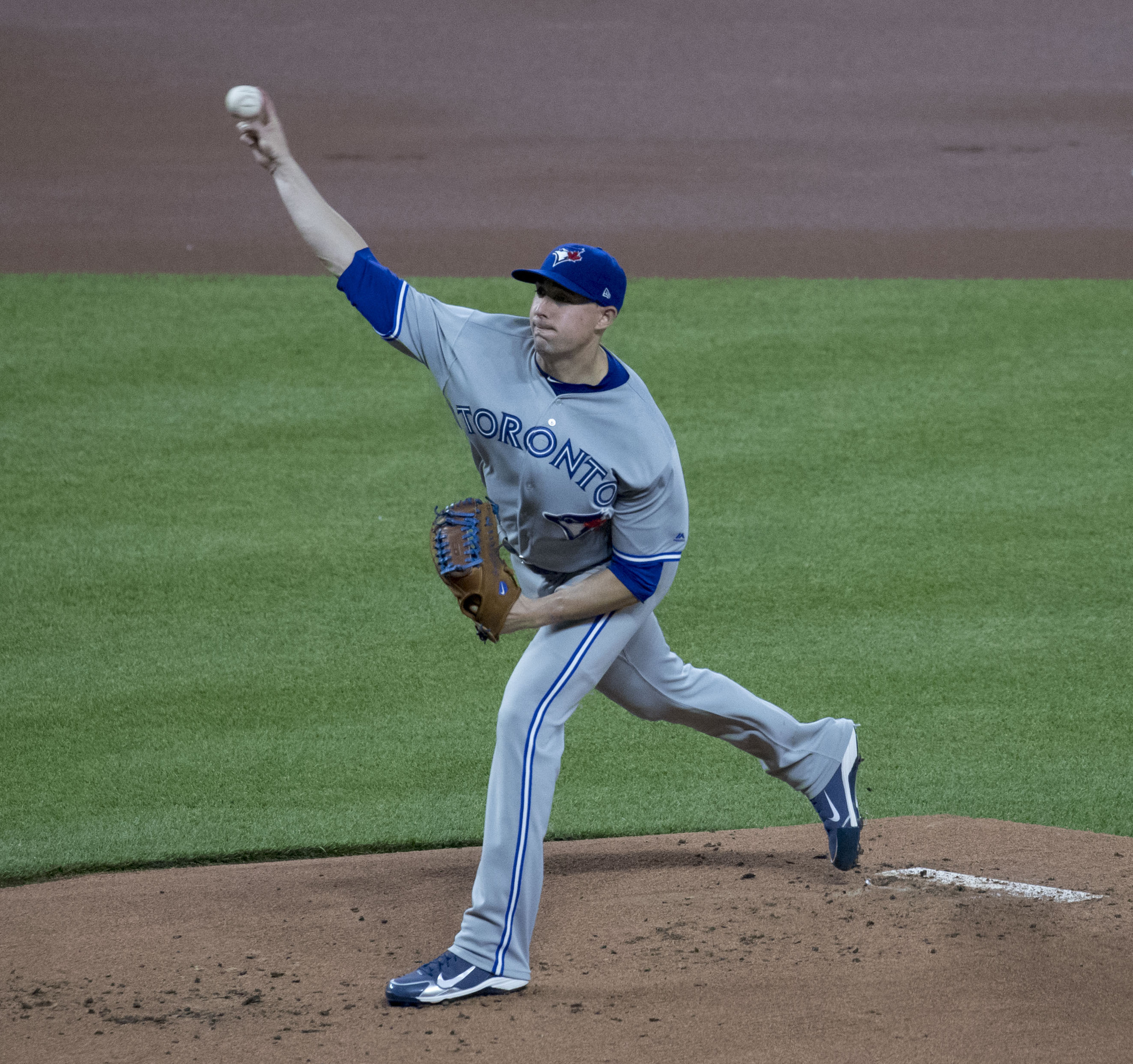
Sanchez with the Blue Jays in 2017

During 2017 spring training, the Blue Jays renewed Sanchez's contract at the MLB-minimum of $535,000. The team had reportedly attempted to negotiate a raise in payment with Sanchez and his agent, Scott Boras, however the offer was refused by Sanchez and Boras. On April 16, Sanchez was placed on the 10-day disabled list due to a lingering blister on his right hand. He underwent minor surgery on April 18 to remove a portion of the fingernail on his right middle finger. Sanchez was activated from the disabled list on April 30 and started that day against the Tampa Bay Rays, but lasted only one inning before leaving with a split fingernail. The injury forced Sanchez back to the disabled list the following day. On May 20, Sanchez was placed on the 10-day disabled list for the third time of the season due to the same finger issue. Sanchez was placed on the disabled list for the fourth time in the season on July 22 with a recurrence of the same blister. Sanchez made only 8 starts for the Blue Jays in 2017 due to blister and finger issues, finishing with a 1–3 record and a 4.25 ERA.

On January 12, 2018, Sanchez avoided salary arbitration with the Blue Jays by signing a one-year, $2.7 million contract. He struggled to begin the season with inconsistency and control, walking 45 batters in 79 2/3 innings. He was placed on the disabled list on June 23 with a contusion in his right hand. He finished the season 4–6 in 20 starts.

=== Houston Astros ===
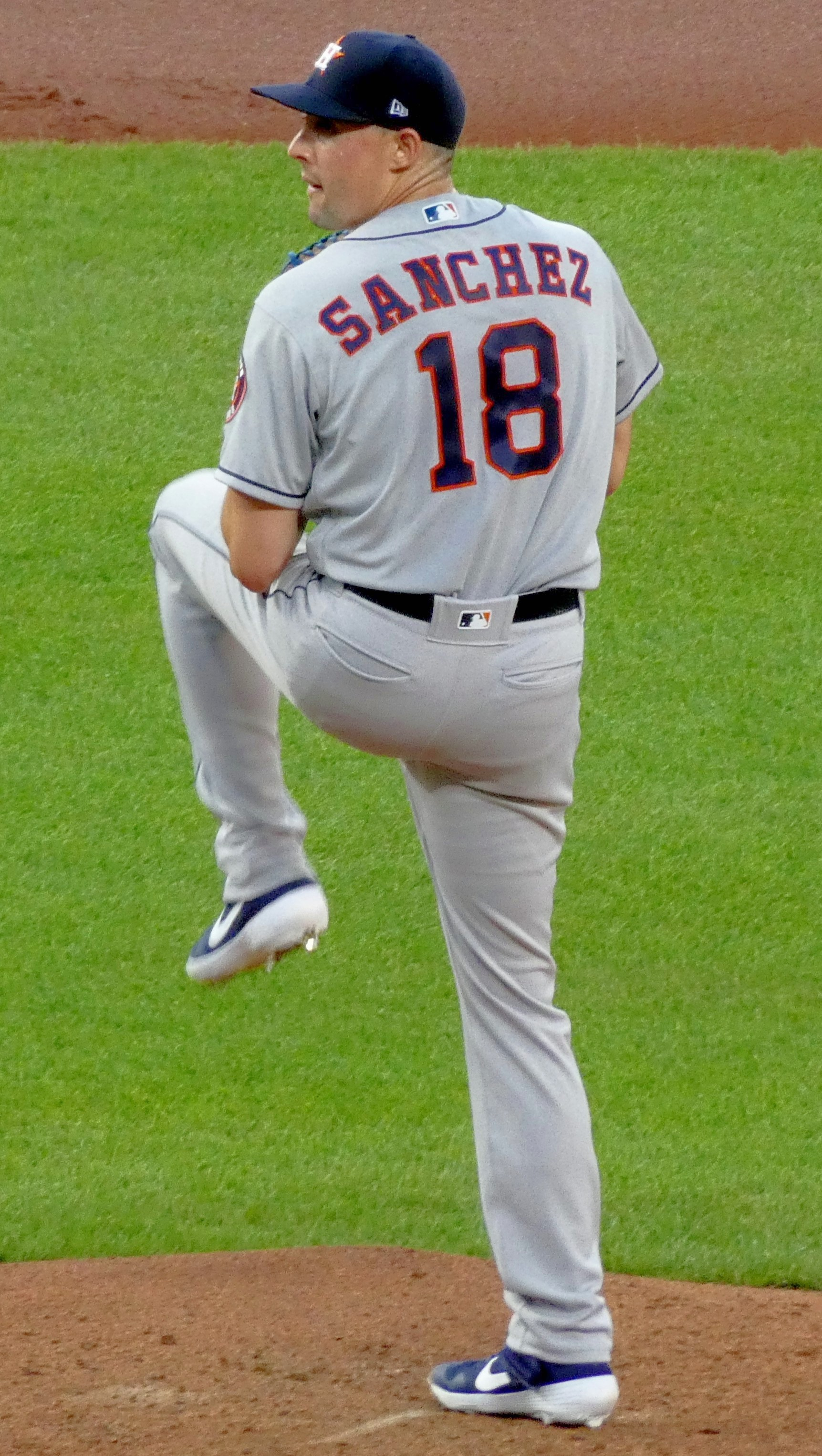
Sanchez with the Houston Astros in 2019

On July 31, 2019, Sanchez was traded to the Houston Astros, along with Joe Biagini and Cal Stevenson, for outfielder Derek Fisher. In his debut with the Astros on August 3, Sanchez pitched the first six innings of a combined no-hitter against the Seattle Mariners. On August 20, Sanchez left the game early with right pectoral discomfort. An MRI revealed a torn capsule in his right shoulder, and general manager Jeff Luhnow announced on September 5 that Sanchez would miss the rest of the 2019 season and possibly the 2020 season as well.

=== San Francisco Giants ===
On February 21, 2021, after sitting out the coronavirus-shortened 2020 season due to injury, Sanchez signed a one-year, $4 million contract with the San Francisco Giants. On June 20, he was placed on the 60-day injured list with right bicep tightness. On August 8, Sanchez was designated for assignment. On August 13, he was placed on unconditional release waivers by the Giants. Through nine games with the Giants (seven starts, two relief outings), Sanchez pitched 35 1/3 innings with a 3.06 ERA and a WHIP of 1.33.

=== Washington Nationals ===
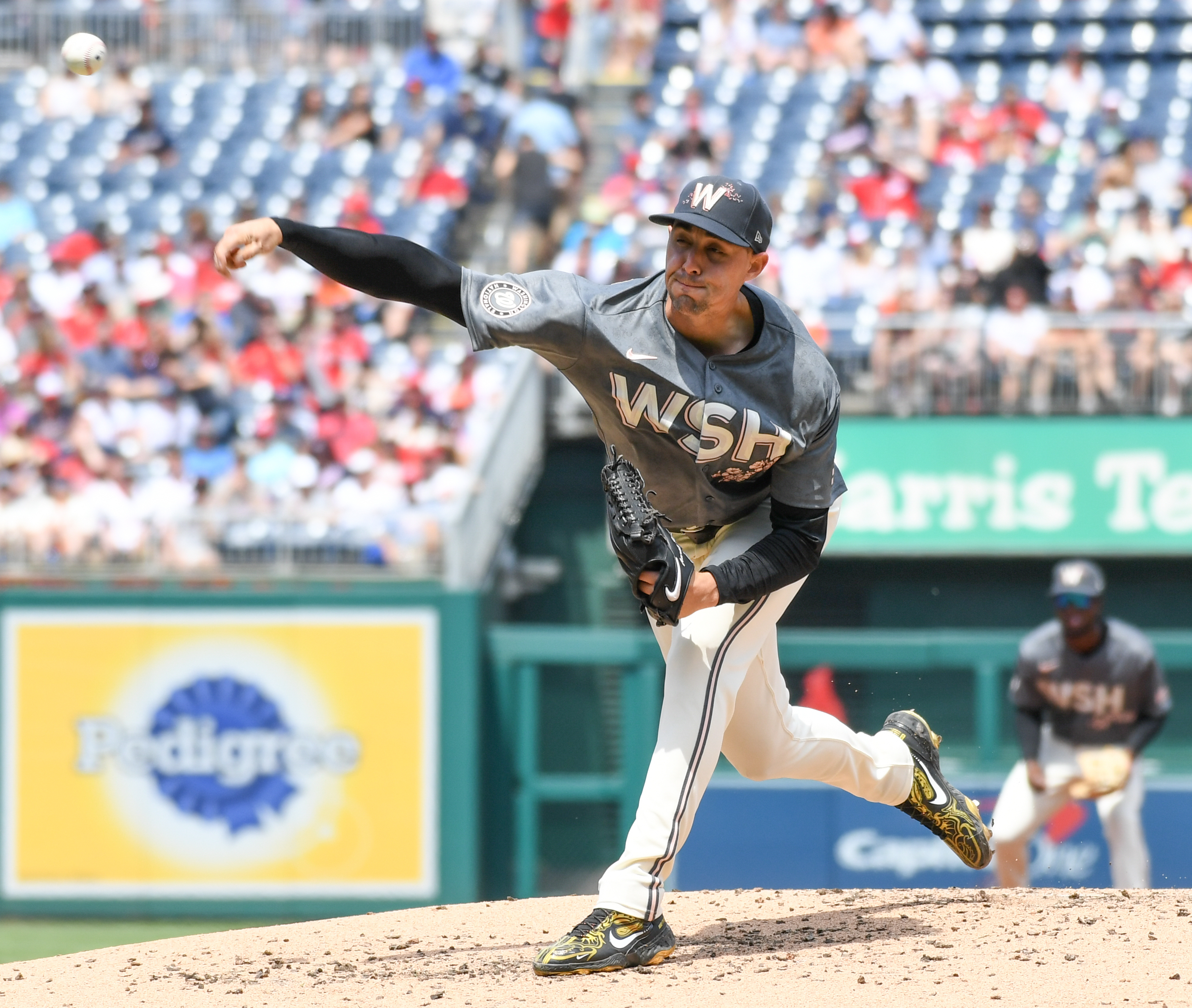
Sanchez with the Washington Nationals in 2022

On March 13, 2022, Sanchez signed a minor league contract with the Washington Nationals. He opened the 2022 season with the Rochester Red Wings, then Washington selected his contract on April 23. He started for the Nationals that day against the San Francisco Giants. He was designated for assignment on May 24. He cleared waivers and was sent outright to Triple-A on May 28. On May 31, Sanchez elected free agency.

=== Minnesota Twins ===
On June 2, 2022, Sanchez signed a minor league contract with the Minnesota Twins organization. He had his contract selected on August 1. He started that day against the Detroit Tigers, allowing two runs and striking out eight in a no decision. Sanchez was designated for assignment by Minnesota the following day. He cleared waivers and was sent outright to the Triple-A St. Paul Saints on August 5.

On August 23, Sanchez was selected back to the major league roster to make a start against the Houston Astros. On September 23, Sanchez was designated for assignment. He cleared waivers and was sent outright to Triple-A St. Paul on September 25. On October 3, Sanchez was yet again selected to the major league roster. He elected free agency following the season on November 10.

On January 30, 2023, Sanchez re-signed with the Twins on a minor league contract. In 18 games (16 starts) for Triple-A St. Paul, he registered a 4–4 record and 57 strikeouts in 73 innings of work. On July 23, Sanchez was released by the Twins organization.

=== Arizona Diamondbacks ===
On August 9, 2023, Sanchez signed a minor league contract with the Arizona Diamondbacks organization. In 4 starts for the Triple-A Reno Aces, he logged a 6.61 ERA with 11 strikeouts in 16 1/3 innings pitched. On August 30, Arizona released Sanchez.

=== Toronto Blue Jays (second stint) ===
On May 6, 2024, Sanchez signed a minor league contract with the Toronto Blue Jays. In 14 starts for the Triple-A Buffalo Bisons, he struggled to a 3–6 record and 7.92 ERA with 41 strikeouts across 61 1/3 innings pitched. Sanchez was released by the Blue Jays organization on August 6.

=== Kansas City Royals ===
On July 16, 2025, it was reported that Sanchez would be attempting an MLB comeback. Sanchez pitched for Toros del Este of the Dominican Professional Baseball League in the 2025–26 season, and was named the league's pitcher of the year. In eight starts, Sanchez posted a 4–2 record with a 1.55 ERA.

On January 27, 2026, Sanchez signed a minor league contract with the Kansas City Royals that included an invitation to spring training. In 13 appearances (including 12 starts) with the Triple-A Omaha Storm Chasers, he struggled to an 0–5 record and 9.43 ERA with 40 strikeouts over 42 innings of work. Sanchez was released by the Royals organization on June 23.

== Personal life ==
Sanchez is believed to be the first MLB player born in Barstow, California. After his debut and successful first season, the Barstow City Council declared October 20, 2014, to be "Aaron Sanchez Day".

Sanchez is of Mexican and European descent, and is eligible to play for either the United States or Mexico in international competition.

== See also ==
- List of Houston Astros no-hitters
- List of Major League Baseball no-hitters
- Toronto Blue Jays award winners and league leaders

Awards and achievements
Preceded by Taylor Cole, Félix Peña	No-hit game August 3, 2019 (with Harris, Biagini & Devenski)	Succeeded by Justin Verlander
