= Alex Ríos =

American baseball player (born 1981)

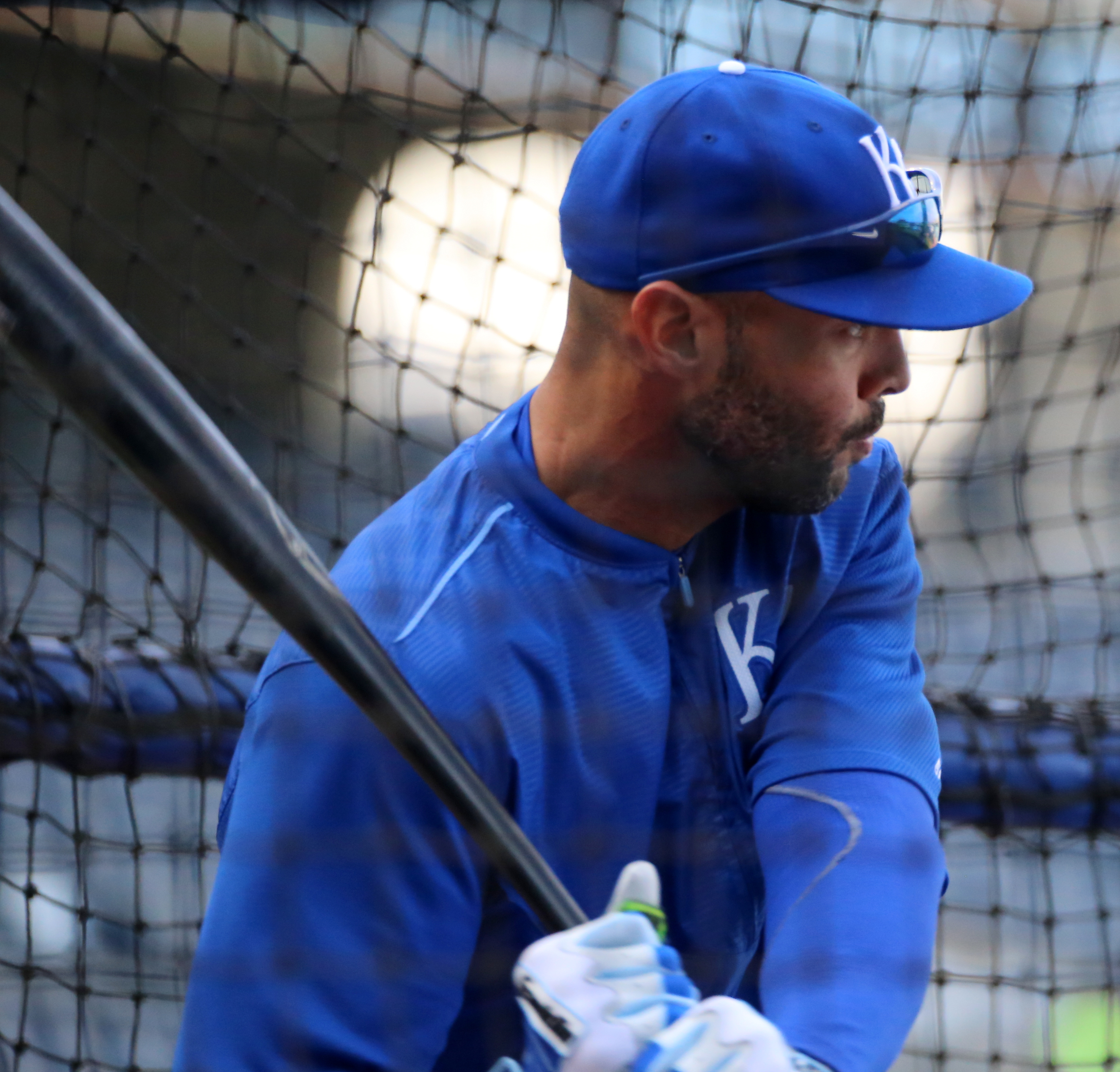
- Rios with the Kansas City Royals in 2015
- Right fielder / Center fielder
- Born: February 18, 1981 (age 45); Coffee, Alabama, U.S.
- Batted: Right Threw: Right

MLB debut
- May 27, 2004, for the Toronto Blue Jays

Last MLB appearance
- October 4, 2015, for the Kansas City Royals

MLB statistics
- Batting average: .277
- Home runs: 169
- Runs batted in: 794
- Stats at Baseball Reference

Teams
- Toronto Blue Jays (2004–2009); Chicago White Sox (2009–2013); Texas Rangers (2013–2014); Kansas City Royals (2015)

Career highlights and awards
- 2× All-Star (2006, 2007); World Series champion (2015)
Medals
Men's baseball
Representing Puerto Rico
World Baseball Classic
Silver medal – second place	2013 San Francisco	Team

Alexis Israel Ríos (born February 18, 1981) is an American former professional baseball right fielder. He played in Major League Baseball (MLB) for the Toronto Blue Jays, Chicago White Sox, Texas Rangers, and Kansas City Royals. A World Series champion with the Royals in 2015, Rios is a two-time MLB All-Star. In 2007, he was a Fielding Bible Award winner for right fielders. In 2013, he hit for the cycle and achieved six hits in one game. Rios is a three-time World Baseball Classic participant with the Puerto Rico national baseball team.

== Professional career ==
Ríos was drafted in the first round (19th overall) by the Toronto Blue Jays in the 1999 MLB draft. A top prospect in the Blue Jays organization for several years, Ríos had considerable success in the organization's minor league system. In 2003, he hit .352 with 11 home runs and 82 RBI en route to winning the Double-A Eastern League Most Valuable Player award. Ríos was promoted to Triple-A Syracuse for the start of the 2004 season and made the jump to the big leagues shortly thereafter.

=== Toronto Blue Jays ===
==== 2004 season ====
He finished his rookie season with Toronto hitting .286 with one home run, 55 runs and 28 RBI in 111 games.

==== 2006 season ====
After his participation with the Puerto Rican team in the World Baseball Classic, Ríos began to show why the Blue Jays valued him so highly in his break-out 2006 season. By June 6, 2006, Ríos was first in the league in batting average (among qualified batters) with a .359 average, along with 11 home runs — a new personal best only 60 games into the 2006 season, and 43 RBI. He then had his first multi-home run game on June 12, 2006, facing the Baltimore Orioles at the Rogers Centre. He was often given as an example of what is known in baseball as a "five-tool player".

On June 27 against the Washington Nationals, Ríos fouled a ball off his foot, which resulted in a staph infection and a hospitalization. At the time, he was batting .330 with 15 home runs and 53 RBI for the Blue Jays. In recognition of his outstanding third season in the majors, the young outfielder was rewarded with a spot as a reserve on the American League All-Star Team. While Ríos did not play in the game due to the staph infection, he was invited to attend the All-Star Game festivities during the July 10 weekend at PNC Park in Pittsburgh.

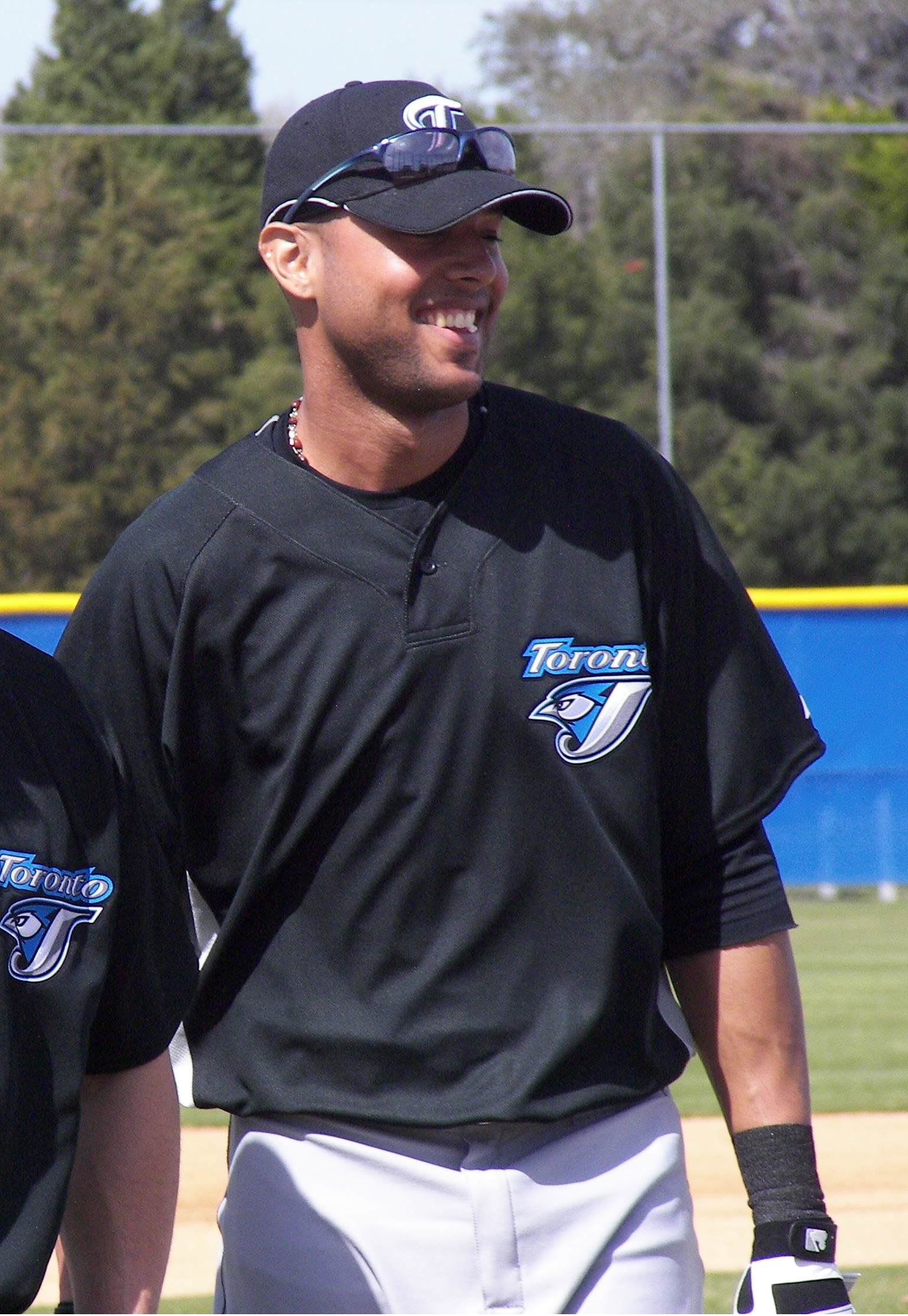
Ríos during his tenure with the Blue Jays in 2007 spring training.

==== 2007 season ====
On February 2, 2007, the Blue Jays and Ríos agreed to a one-year, $2.535 million contract to avoid salary arbitration. Ríos' performance earned him a spot as a reserve on the American League All-Star team and he also agreed to participate in the 2007 State Farm Home Run Derby. He led all competitors by hitting 19 home runs throughout the contest, but the final round was won by Vladimir Guerrero of the Los Angeles Angels of Anaheim.

Ríos fielded the last out in the All-Star Game. He led the team in all offensive categories during the first half of the season but slumped after the All-Star Break, with his hitting average settling to slightly below .300, and was overtaken by teammate Frank Thomas as HR and RBI leader. In 2007, he had the lowest range factor of all major league right fielders, 1.82. Ríos was honored with a Fielding Bible Award as the best fielding right fielder in MLB. He was voted the Blue Jays Player of the Year.

==== 2008 season ====
Rios signed a seven-year contract with the Blue Jays in April 2008 for a guaranteed amount of $69,835,000: $5.9 million in 2009, $9.7 million in 2010, $12 million each in 2011 and 2012 and $12.5 million each in 2013 and 2014. He finished the 2008 season with a slight statistical decline: .291 average, 15 home runs, 32 stolen bases, and 79 runs batted in. The home run total tied him with Lyle Overbay for the Blue Jays' second most home runs that season (only Vernon Wells had more with 20). Ríos also set a career high in home runs after the All-Star Break that year.

==== 2009 season ====
On June 4 against the Los Angeles Angels of Anaheim, Ríos struck out in all five of his plate appearances, also known as the platinum sombrero, in a 6–5 loss to the Angels at Rogers Centre. Later that day, Ríos was videotaped cursing a heckling fan after he walked past a child seeking an autograph while leaving a fundraising gala for the Jays Care Foundation. Ríos has since publicly apologized for the incident.

The Toronto Blue Jays placed Ríos on waivers on August 7, 2009. On August 10, 2009, Ríos was officially claimed off waivers by the Chicago White Sox.

=== Chicago White Sox ===
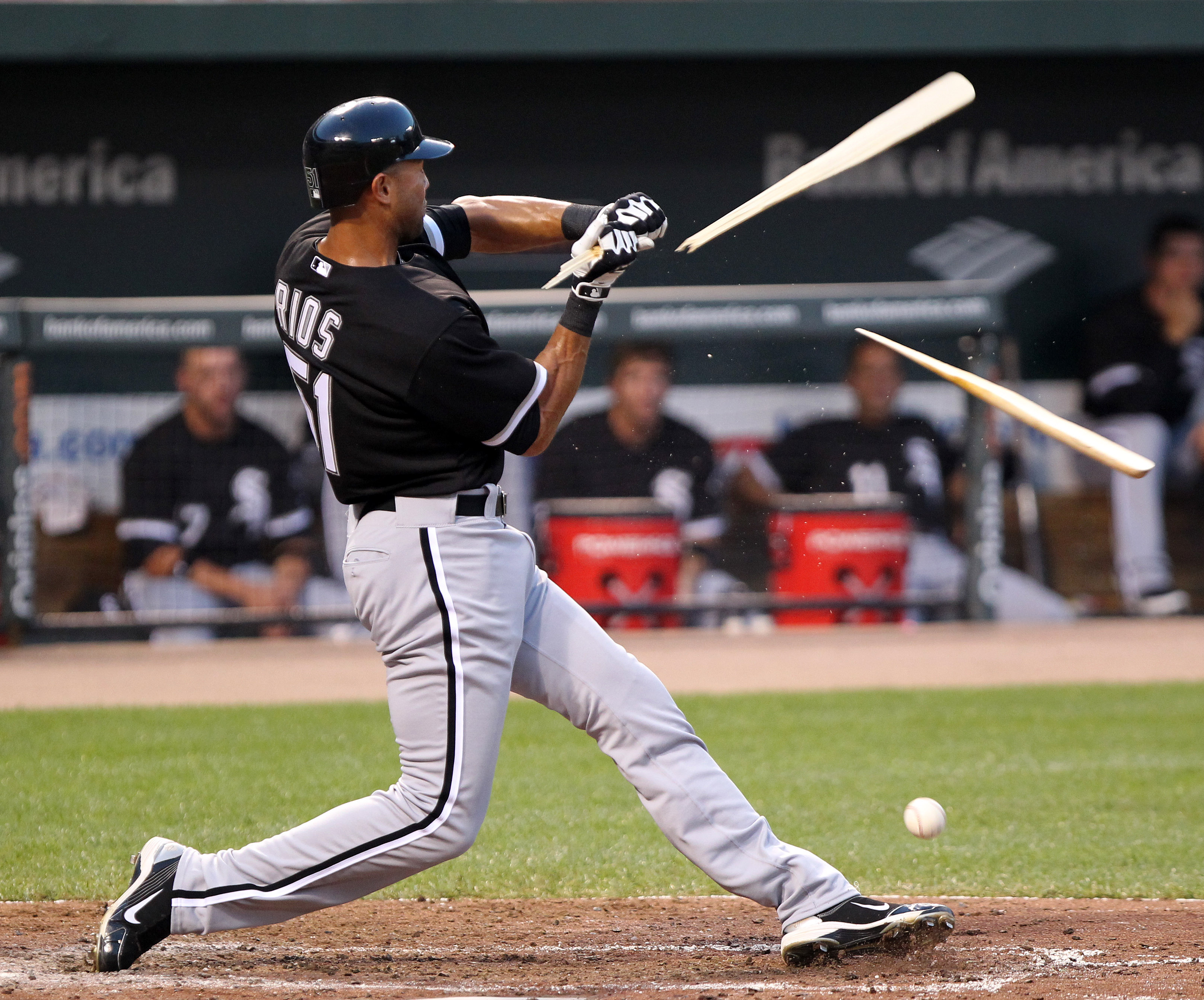
Rios at bat with the White Sox

After being claimed off of waivers by the Chicago White Sox on August 10, Ríos batted .199, with three home runs, 9 RBI and a .296 on-base percentage in 146 at bats over 41 games. Rios batted .284, with 21 home runs, 88 RBI and a .334 on-base percentage for the White Sox in 2010. After a disappointing 2011 season in which he batted a career-low .227, Ríos rebounded to have one of his finest years in 2012, setting career highs with a .304 average, 25 home runs and 91 RBIs.

On July 9, 2013, Rios collected six hits in a game (tied AL record) in an 11–4 win over the Tigers. Ríos was the starting right fielder for 2013 until his trade. After the trade, Jordan Danks and Avisail García took over. In 599 games over five years for Chicago, he hit .269/.310/.430 with 74 home runs, 287 RBI, and 99 stolen bases.

=== Texas Rangers ===
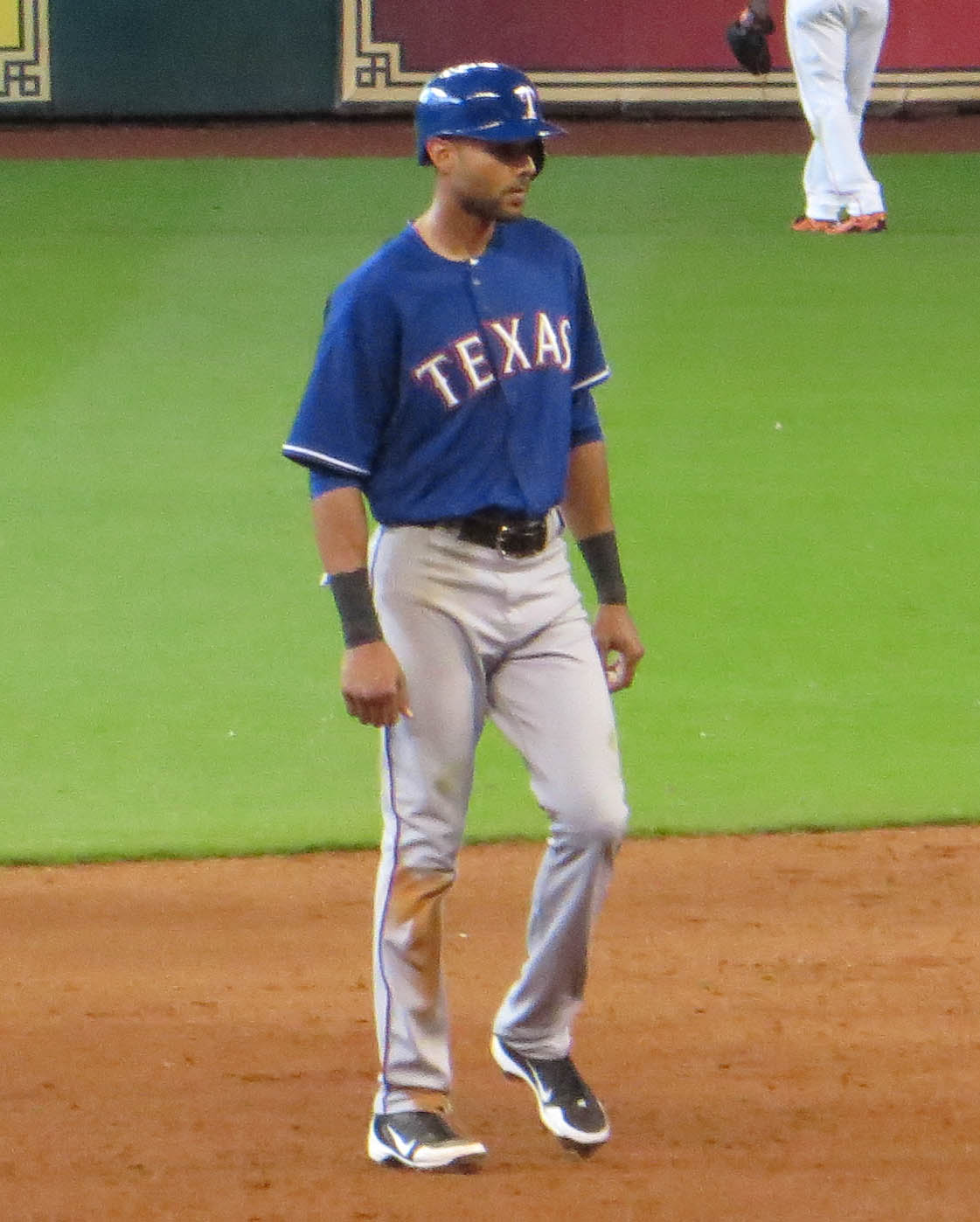
Rios with the Texas Rangers

On August 8, 2013, Ríos was claimed off waivers by the Texas Rangers, and was traded to them on August 9 for a player to be named later or cash considerations. Leury Garcia was announced as the player to be named later on August 11. He became the team's starting right fielder, replacing the suspended Nelson Cruz. Rios hit for the cycle against the Houston Astros on September 23, 2013. In all of 2013, Ríos hit .278/.324/.432 with 18 home runs, 81 RBI and 42 stolen bases. For the 2014 season, he batted .280 with four home runs, 54 RBI and 17 stolen bases in 131 games. The Rangers declined Ríos' option for the 2015 season on October 15, 2014, making him a free agent.

=== Kansas City Royals ===
Ríos signed a one-year contract with the Kansas City Royals on December 19, 2014, worth $9.5 million. The contract included an option for the 2016 season.

In his Royals debut on April 6, 2015, Ríos hit a three-run home run in a 10–1 win to cap off a three-hit game. For the 2015 season, Ríos hit .255 with four home runs and 32 RBI while appearing in 105 games. While he had a down year with Kansas City, Ríos had many notable moments in the 2015 MLB playoffs. In Game 4 of the 2015 American League Division Series, Ríos hit a leadoff single in the top of the eighth inning, sparking a five-run inning that erased a four-run deficit and forced a Game 5 of the series. In Game 5, he hit a two-RBI double in the bottom of the fifth inning, driving in what proved to be the winning runs of the game. Ríos was just as pivotal in the 2015 American League Championship Series, batting .368 with a home run and three runs batted in. At the end of the season, the Royals won the World Series, giving Ríos his first championship ring.

On November 4, 2015, Ríos' option was declined by the Royals, and he received a $1.5 million buyout.

== 2013 World Baseball Classic ==
Rios participated in the 2013 World Baseball Classic playing for Puerto Rico. Although Rios slumped for most of the tournament, he hit a clutch two-run home run against Japan in the semifinals and handed Puerto Rico its first WBC Finals appearance. They would go on to be defeated by the Dominican Republic 3–0 in the finals.

== See also ==
- List of Major League Baseball players from Puerto Rico
- List of Major League Baseball single-game hits leaders
- List of Major League Baseball players to hit for the cycle

Achievements
Preceded by Brandon Barnes	Hitting for the cycle September 23, 2013	Succeeded by Michael Cuddyer
