= List of Major League Baseball annual assists leaders =

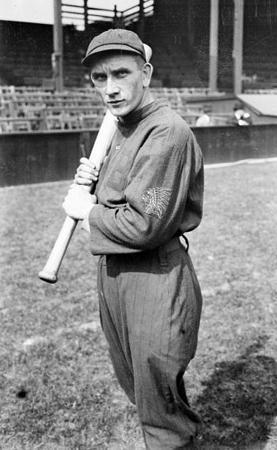
Rabbit Maranville, the all-time leader in assists

The following is a list of annual leaders in assists in Major League Baseball (MLB), with separate lists for the American League and the National League. The list also includes several professional leagues and associations that were never part of MLB.

In baseball statistics, an assist (denoted by A) is a defensive statistic, baseball being one of the few sports in which the defensive team controls the ball. An assist is credited to every defensive player who fields or touches the ball (after it has been hit by the batter) before the recording of a putout, even if the contact was unintentional. For example, if a ball strikes a player's leg and bounces off him to another fielder, who tags the baserunner, the first player is credited with an assist. A fielder can receive a maximum of one assist per out recorded. An assist is also credited if a putout would have occurred, had another fielder not committed an error. For example, a shortstop might field a ground ball cleanly, but the first baseman might drop his throw. In this case, an error would be charged to the first baseman, and the shortstop would be credited with an assist.

Rabbit Maranville is the all-time leader in assists with 8,967. Frankie Frisch holds the record for most assists in a season with 643 in 1927. Jose Altuve is the active leader in assists.

== American League ==
Year	Player	Team(s)	Assists	Ref
1901	Billy Clingman	Washington Senators	462	
1902	Freddy Parent	Boston Americans	492	
1903	Bobby Wallace	St. Louis Browns	468	
1904	George Davis	Chicago White Sox	514	
1905	Joe Cassidy	Washington Senators	520	
1906	Terry Turner	Cleveland Naps	570	
1907	Bobby Wallace	St. Louis Browns	517	
1908	Heinie Wagner	Boston Red Sox	569	
1909	Donie Bush	Detroit Tigers	567	
1910	George McBride	Washington Senators	518	
1911	Donie Bush	Detroit Tigers	556	
1912	Donie Bush	Detroit Tigers	547	
1913	Buck Weaver	Chicago White Sox	520	
1914	Donie Bush	Detroit Tigers	544	
1915	Donie Bush	Detroit Tigers	504	
1916	Del Pratt	St. Louis Browns	491	
1917	Ray Chapman	Cleveland Indians	528	
1918	Roger Peckinpaugh	New York Yankees	439	
1919	Del Pratt	New York Yankees	491	
1920	Del Pratt	New York Yankees	515	
1921	Everett Scott	Boston Red Sox	528	
1922	Everett Scott	New York Yankees	538	
1923	Roger Peckinpaugh	Washington Senators	510	
1924	Joe Sewell	Cleveland Indians	514	
1925	Joe Sewell	Cleveland Indians	535	
1926	Topper Rigney	Boston Red Sox	492	
1927	Tony Lazzeri	New York Yankees	525	
1928	Charlie Gehringer	Detroit Tigers	507	
1929	Ski Melillo	St. Louis Browns	519	
1930	Ski Melillo	St. Louis Browns	572	
1931	Ski Melillo	St. Louis Browns	543	
1932	Ski Melillo	St. Louis Browns	526	
1933	Charlie Gehringer	Detroit Tigers	542	
1934	Billy Rogell	Detroit Tigers	518	
1935	Luke Appling	Chicago White Sox	556	
1936	Charlie Gehringer	Detroit Tigers	524	
1937	Luke Appling	Chicago White Sox	541	
1938	Frankie Crosetti	New York Yankees	506	
1939	Luke Appling; Joe Gordon	Chicago White Sox; New York Yankees	461	
1940	Joe Gordon	New York Yankees	505	
1941	Luke Appling	Chicago White Sox	473	
1942	Johnny Pesky	Boston Red Sox	465	
1943	Luke Appling	Chicago White Sox	500	
1944	Lou Boudreau	Cleveland Indians	517	
1945	Irv Hall	Philadelphia Athletics	498	
1946	Luke Appling	Chicago White Sox	505	
1947	Vern Stephens	St. Louis Browns	494	
1948	Vern Stephens	Boston Red Sox	540	
1949	Vern Stephens	Boston Red Sox	508	
1950	Jerry Priddy	Detroit Tigers	542	
1951	Chico Carrasquel	Chicago White Sox	477	
1952	Phil Rizzuto	New York Yankees	458	
1953	Billy Hunter	St. Louis Browns	512	
1954	Harvey Kuenn	Detroit Tigers	496	
1955	Nellie Fox	Chicago White Sox	483	
1956	Luis Aparicio	Chicago White Sox	474	
1957	Nellie Fox	Chicago White Sox	453	
1958	Luis Aparicio	Chicago White Sox	463	
1959	Luis Aparicio	Chicago White Sox	460	
1960	Luis Aparicio	Chicago White Sox	551	
1961	Luis Aparicio	Chicago White Sox	487	
1962	Zoilo Versalles	Minnesota Twins	501	
1963	Ron Hansen	Chicago White Sox	483	
1964	Bobby Knoop	California Angels	522	
1965	Ron Hansen	Chicago White Sox	527	
1966	Jim Fregosi	California Angels	531	
1967	Ron Hansen	Chicago White Sox	482	
1968	Luis Aparicio	Chicago White Sox	535	
1969	Leo Cárdenas	Minnesota Twins	570	
1970	Ed Brinkman	Washington Senators	569	
1971	Sandy Alomar	California Angels	530	
1972	Freddie Patek	Kansas City Royals	510	
1973	Mark Belanger	Baltimore Orioles	530	
1974	Mark Belanger	Baltimore Orioles	552	
1975	Bucky Dent	Chicago White Sox	543	
1976	Mark Belanger	Baltimore Orioles	545	
1977	Roy Smalley	Minnesota Twins	504	
1978	Roy Smalley	Minnesota Twins	527	
1979	Roy Smalley	Minnesota Twins	572	
1980	Rick Burleson	Boston Red Sox	528	
1981	Rick Burleson	California Angels	489	
1982	Robin Yount	Milwaukee Brewers	489	
1983	Cal Ripken Jr.	Baltimore Orioles	534	
1984	Cal Ripken Jr.	Baltimore Orioles	583	
1985	Frank White	Kansas City Royals	490	
1986	Cal Ripken Jr.	Baltimore Orioles	482	
1987	Harold Reynolds	Seattle Mariners	507	
1988	Ozzie Guillén	Chicago White Sox	570	
1989	Cal Ripken Jr.	Baltimore Orioles	531	
1990	Harold Reynolds	Seattle Mariners	499	
1991	Cal Ripken Jr.	Baltimore Orioles	528	
1992	Travis Fryman	Detroit Tigers	489	
1993	Cal Ripken Jr.	Baltimore Orioles	495	
1994	Gary DiSarcina	California Angels	358	
1995	Carlos Baerga	Cleveland Indians	444	
1996	Cal Ripken Jr.	Baltimore Orioles	483	
1997	Derek Jeter	New York Yankees	457	
1998	Damion Easley	Detroit Tigers	480	
1999	Mike Bordick	Baltimore Orioles	511	
2000	Miguel Tejada	Oakland Athletics	501	
2001	Alex Gonzalez	Toronto Blue Jays	509	
2002	Miguel Tejada	Oakland Athletics	504	
2003	Miguel Tejada	Oakland Athletics	490	
2004	Miguel Tejada	Baltimore Orioles	526	
2005	Miguel Tejada	Baltimore Orioles	479	
2006	Michael Young	Texas Rangers	492	
2007	Aaron Hill	Toronto Blue Jays	560	
2008	Robinson Canó	New York Yankees	482	
2009	Aaron Hill	Toronto Blue Jays	484	
2010	Alexei Ramírez	Chicago White Sox	499	
2011	Alcides Escobar	Kansas City Royals	459	
2012	J.J. Hardy	Baltimore Orioles	529	
2013	Brian Dozier	Minnesota Twins	461	
2014	Alexei Ramírez	Chicago White Sox	486	
2015	Elvis Andrus	Texas Rangers	516	
2016	Marcus Semien	Oakland Athletics	477	
2017	Elvis Andrus	Texas Rangers	493	
2018	Marcus Semien	Oakland Athletics	458	
2019	Marcus Semien	Oakland Athletics	436	
2020	Marcus Semien	Oakland Athletics	147	
2021	Isiah Kiner-Falefa	Texas Rangers	432	
2022	Marcus Semien	Texas Rangers	441	
2023	Andrés Giménez	Cleveland Guardians	401	
2024	Zach Neto	Los Angeles Angels	405	
2025	Trevor Story	Boston Red Sox	397	
2026	Cole Young	Seattle Mariners	405	

== National League ==
Year	Player	Team(s)	Assists	Ref
1882	Jack Glasscock	Cleveland Blues	313	
1883	Jack Farrell	Providence Grays	365	
1884	Fred Pfeffer	Chicago Cubs	422	
1885	Jack Glasscock	St. Louis Maroons	404	
1886	Fred Dunlap	St. Louis Maroons; Detroit Wolverines	393	
1887	Jack Glasscock	Indianapolis Hoosiers	493	
1888	Fred Pfeffer	Chicago Cubs	457	
1889	Jack Glasscock	Indianapolis Hoosiers	485	
1890	Bob Allen	Philadelphia Phillies	500	
1891	Germany Smith	Cincinnati Reds	507	
1892	Germany Smith	Cincinnati Reds	561	
1893	Germany Smith	Cincinnati Reds	500	
1894	Germany Smith	Cincinnati Reds	513	
1895	Bill Dahlen	Chicago Cubs	527	
1896	Cupid Childs	Cleveland Spiders	487	
1897	Monte Cross	St. Louis Browns	516	
1898	Tommy Corcoran	Cincinnati Reds	561	
1899	Bobby Wallace	St. Louis Perfectos	536	
1900	Bill Dahlen	Brooklyn Superbas	517	
1901	Bobby Wallace	St. Louis Cardinals	542	
1902	John Farrell	St. Louis Cardinals	501	
1903	Bill Dahlen	Brooklyn Superbas	477	
1904	Johnny Evers	Chicago Cubs	518	
1905	Tommy Corcoran	Cincinnati Reds	531	
1906	Mickey Doolin	Philadelphia Phillies	480	
1907	Johnny Evers	Chicago Cubs	500	
1908	Joe Tinker	Chicago Cubs	570	
1909	Mickey Doolin	Philadelphia Phillies	484	
1910	Mickey Doolin	Philadelphia Phillies	500	
1911	Joe Tinker	Chicago Cubs	486	
1912	Mickey Doolin	Philadelphia Phillies	476	
1913	Mickey Doolin	Philadelphia Phillies	494	
1914	Rabbit Maranville	Boston Braves	574	
1915	Art Fletcher	New York Giants	544	
1916	Rabbit Maranville	Boston Braves	515	
1917	Art Fletcher	New York Giants	565	
1918	Art Fletcher	New York Giants	484	
1919	Art Fletcher	New York Giants	521	
1920	Dave Bancroft	Philadelphia Phillies; New York Giants	598	
1921	Dave Bancroft	New York Giants	546	
1922	Dave Bancroft	New York Giants	579	
1923	Jimmy Johnston	Brooklyn Dodgers	532	
1924	Glenn Wright	Pittsburgh Pirates	601	
1925	Sparky Adams	Chicago Cubs	573	
1926	Tommy Thevenow	St. Louis Cardinals	597	
1927	Frankie Frisch	St. Louis Cardinals	643	
1928	Travis Jackson	New York Giants	547	
1929	Travis Jackson	New York Giants	552	
1930	Tommy Thevenow	Philadelphia Phillies	554	
1931	Tony Cuccinello	Cincinnati Reds	499	
1932	Dick Bartell	Philadelphia Phillies	529	
1933	Hughie Critz	New York Giants	541	
1934	Hughie Critz	New York Giants	510	
1935	Billy Herman	Chicago Cubs	520	
1936	Dick Bartell; Tony Cuccinello	New York Giants; Boston Bees	559	
1937	Tony Cuccinello	Boston Bees	524	
1938	Pep Young	Pittsburgh Pirates	554	
1939	Arky Vaughan	Pittsburgh Pirates	531	
1940	Arky Vaughan	Pittsburgh Pirates	546	
1941	Marty Marion	St. Louis Cardinals	489	
1942	Pee Wee Reese	Brooklyn Dodgers	482	
1943	Whitey Wietelmann	Boston Braves	581	
1944	Eddie Miller	Cincinnati Reds	544	
1945	Buddy Kerr	New York Giants	515	
1946	Marty Marion	St. Louis Cardinals	480	
1947	Buddy Kerr	New York Giants	461	
1948	Stan Rojek	Pittsburgh Pirates	475	
1949	Granny Hamner	Philadelphia Phillies	506	
1950	Roy Smalley Jr.	Chicago Cubs	541	
1951	Alvin Dark	New York Giants	465	
1952	Roy McMillan	Cincinnati Reds	495	
1953	Roy McMillan	Cincinnati Reds	519	
1954	Johnny Logan	Milwaukee Braves	489	
1955	Johnny Logan	Milwaukee Braves	511	
1956	Roy McMillan	Cincinnati Redlegs	511	
1957	Don Blasingame	St. Louis Cardinals	512	
1958	Bill Mazeroski	Pittsburgh Pirates	496	
1959	Ernie Banks	Chicago Cubs	519	
1960	Ernie Banks	Chicago Cubs	488	
1961	Bill Mazeroski	Pittsburgh Pirates	505	
1962	Dick Groat	Pittsburgh Pirates	521	
1963	Bill Mazeroski	Pittsburgh Pirates	506	
1964	Bill Mazeroski	Pittsburgh Pirates	543	
1965	Maury Wills	Los Angeles Dodgers	535	
1966	Bill Mazeroski	Pittsburgh Pirates	538	
1967	Hal Lanier	San Francisco Giants	519	
1968	Don Kessinger	Chicago Cubs	573	
1969	Don Kessinger	Chicago Cubs	542	
1970	Don Kessinger	Chicago Cubs	501	
1971	Larry Bowa	Philadelphia Phillies	560	
1972	Chris Speier	San Francisco Giants	517	
1973	Bill Russell	Los Angeles Dodgers	560	
1974	Dave Concepción	Cincinnati Reds	536	
1975	Manny Trillo	Chicago Cubs	509	
1976	Manny Trillo	Chicago Cubs	527	
1977	Iván DeJesús	Chicago Cubs	595	
1978	Iván DeJesús	Chicago Cubs	558	
1979	Ozzie Smith	San Diego Padres	555	
1980	Ozzie Smith	San Diego Padres	621	
1981	Ozzie Smith	San Diego Padres	422	
1982	Ozzie Smith	St. Louis Cardinals	535	
1983	Ryne Sandberg	Chicago Cubs	572	
1984	Ryne Sandberg	Chicago Cubs	550	
1985	Ozzie Smith	St. Louis Cardinals	549	
1986	Ryne Sandberg	Chicago Cubs	495	
1987	Ozzie Smith	St. Louis Cardinals	516	
1988	Ryne Sandberg	Chicago Cubs	522	
1989	José Oquendo	San Diego Padres	523	
1990	Barry Larkin; Ryne Sandberg	Cincinnati Reds; Chicago Cubs	469	
1991	Ryne Sandberg	Chicago Cubs	515	
1992	Ryne Sandberg	Chicago Cubs	539	
1993	Jay Bell	Pittsburgh Pirates	527	
1994	Jay Bell	Pittsburgh Pirates	380	
1995	Craig Biggio	Houston Astros	419	
1996	Jay Bell	Pittsburgh Pirates	478	
1997	Craig Biggio	Houston Astros	504	
1998	Neifi Pérez	Colorado Rockies	516	
1999	Neifi Pérez	Colorado Rockies	481	
2000	Neifi Pérez	Colorado Rockies	523	
2001	Orlando Cabrera	Montreal Expos	514	
2002	Juan Uribe	Colorado Rockies	504	
2003	Rafael Furcal; Cesar Izturis	Atlanta Braves; Los Angeles Dodgers	481	
2004	Jack Wilson	Pittsburgh Pirates	492	
2005	Jack Wilson	Pittsburgh Pirates	523	
2006	Orlando Hudson	Arizona Diamondbacks	510	
2007	Troy Tulowitzki	Colorado Rockies	561	
2008	Chase Utley	Philadelphia Phillies	465	
2009	Miguel Tejada	Houston Astros	475	
2010	Brendan Ryan	St. Louis Cardinals	430	
2011	Omar Infante	Florida Marlins	466	
2012	Aaron Hill	Arizona Diamondbacks	487	
2013	Andrelton Simmons	Atlanta Braves	499	
2014	Jean Segura	Milwaukee Brewers	447	
2015	DJ LeMahieu	Colorado Rockies	452	
2016	Jean Segura	Arizona Diamondbacks	428	
2017	DJ LeMahieu	Colorado Rockies	470	
2018	Brandon Crawford	San Francisco Giants	435	
2019	Paul DeJong	St. Louis Cardinals	435	
2020	Trevor Story	Colorado Rockies	161	
2021	Ozzie Albies	Atlanta Braves	383	
2022	Tommy Edman	St. Louis Cardinals	435	
2023	Nico Hoerner	Chicago Cubs	411	
2024	Ezequiel Tovar	Colorado Rockies	435	
2025	Willy Adames	San Francisco Giants	398	
2026	Nico Hoerner	Chicago Cubs	416	

== Other Major Leagues ==
=== American Association ===
Year	Player	Team(s)	Assists	Ref
1882	Bill Gleason	St. Louis Brown Stockings	294	
1883	John Richmond	Columbus Buckeyes	306	
1884	Pop Smith	Columbus Buckeyes	394	
1885	Germany Smith	Brooklyn Grays	455	
1886	Frank Fennelly	Cincinnati Red Stockings	485	
1887	Bid McPhee	Cincinnati Red Stockings	434	
1888	Frank Fennelly	Cincinnati Red Stockings	476	
1889	Ollie Beard	Cincinnati Red Stockings	537	
1890	Joe Gerhardt	Brooklyn Gladiators/St. Louis Browns	440	
1891	Bobby Wheelock	Columbus Solons	474	

=== National Association of Professional Base Ball Players ===
Year	Player	Team(s)	Assists	Ref
1871	Davy Force	Washington Olympics	161	
1872	George Wright	Boston Red Stockings	193	
1873	George Wright	Boston Red Stockings	247	
1874	Dickey Pearce	Brooklyn Atlantics	205	
1875	Dickey Pearce	St. Louis Brown Stockings	263	

=== Union Association ===
Year	Player	Team(s)	Assists	Ref
1884	Fred Dunlap, Lou Say	St. Louis Maroons, Kansas City Cowboys	302	

=== Players' League ===
Year	Player	Team(s)	Assists
1890	Lou Bierbauer	Brooklyn Ward's Wonders	468

=== Federal League ===
Year	Player	Team(s)	Assists
1914	Mickey Doolin	Baltimore Terrapins	476
1915	Jimmy Esmond	Indianapolis Hoosiers	482
