= Orlando Hudson =

American baseball player (born 1977)

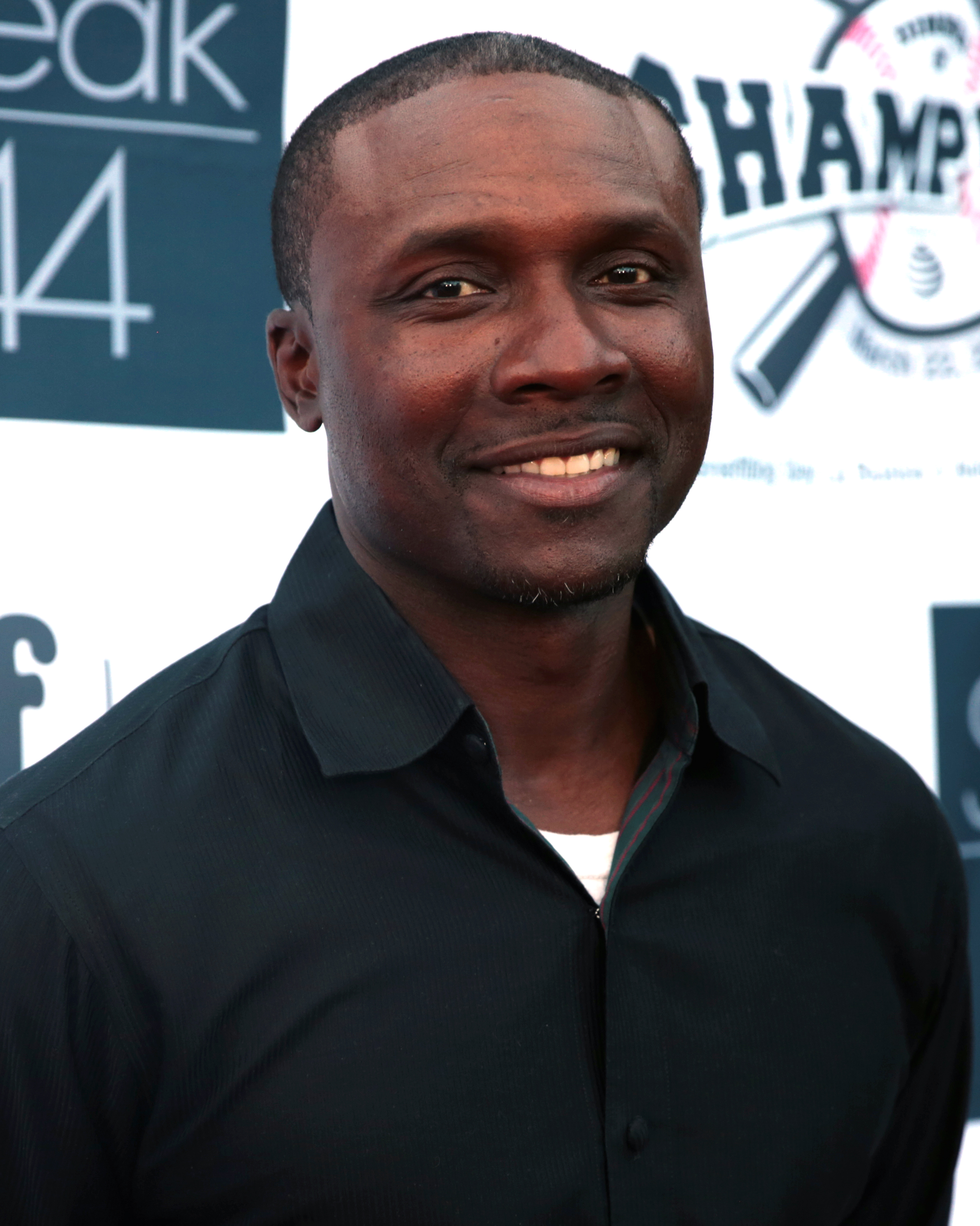
- Hudson in 2017
- Second baseman
- Born: December 12, 1977 (age 48); Darlington, South Carolina, U.S.
- Batted: Switch Threw: Right

MLB debut
- July 24, 2002, for the Toronto Blue Jays

Last MLB appearance
- October 3, 2012, for the Chicago White Sox

MLB statistics
- Batting average: .273
- Home runs: 93
- Runs batted in: 542
- Stats at Baseball Reference

Teams
- Toronto Blue Jays (2002–2005); Arizona Diamondbacks (2006–2008); Los Angeles Dodgers (2009); Minnesota Twins (2010); San Diego Padres (2011–2012); Chicago White Sox (2012)

Career highlights and awards
- 2× All-Star (2007, 2009); 4× Gold Glove Award (2005–2007, 2009)
Medals
Men's baseball
Representing United States
Baseball World Cup
Silver medal – second place	2001 Taipei	National team

Orlando Thill Hudson (born December 12, 1977) is an American former professional baseball second baseman. He played in Major League Baseball from 2002 to 2012 with the Toronto Blue Jays, Arizona Diamondbacks, Los Angeles Dodgers, Minnesota Twins, San Diego Padres and Chicago White Sox. Hudson was known for his fielding abilities, and for making spectacular lunging catches and diving stabs at grounders. His defensive talents were recognized in 2005, when he won his first American League Gold Glove Award while with the Toronto Blue Jays.

== Early life ==
Hudson was born on December 12, 1977, in Darlington, South Carolina. He attended Darlington High School, where he was a three-sport standout in baseball, football, and basketball. In baseball, he was the Player of the Year and an All-State selection.

Hudson was the quarterback of Darlington High School's first-ever football team, and also served as the team's punter.

After high school, Hudson went on to play baseball at Spartanburg Methodist College.

== Professional career ==
=== Toronto Blue Jays ===
Hudson was drafted 4th in the 33rd round by the Toronto Blue Jays in the 1997 Major League Baseball draft. He began his professional career with the Medicine Hat Blue Jays in the rookie leagues in 1998, hitting .298. He continued through the minors with the Hagerstown Suns (1999), Dunedin Blue Jays (2000), Tennessee Smokies (2000–01) and Syracuse Sky Chiefs (2001–02). In 2001, he was a Southern League All-Star and a Baseball America 1st team Minor League All-Star at second base.

He made his major league debut on July 24, 2002, for the Blue Jays against the Baltimore Orioles. He was hitless in four at-bats in that game. Hudson recorded his first Major League hit in the second inning on July 26 against the Minnesota Twins when he slapped an RBI single to center field off pitcher Joe Mays. His first home run was hit on August 5 against Baltimore's Rodrigo López. He played for the Blue Jays from 2002 to 2005.

=== Arizona Diamondbacks ===
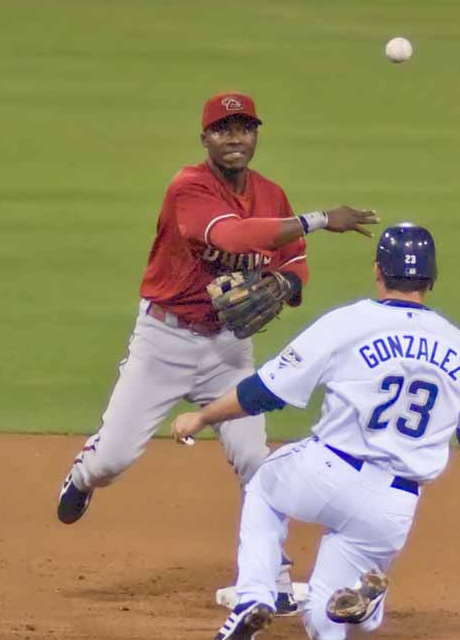
Hudson playing for the Arizona Diamondbacks on August 28, 2007.

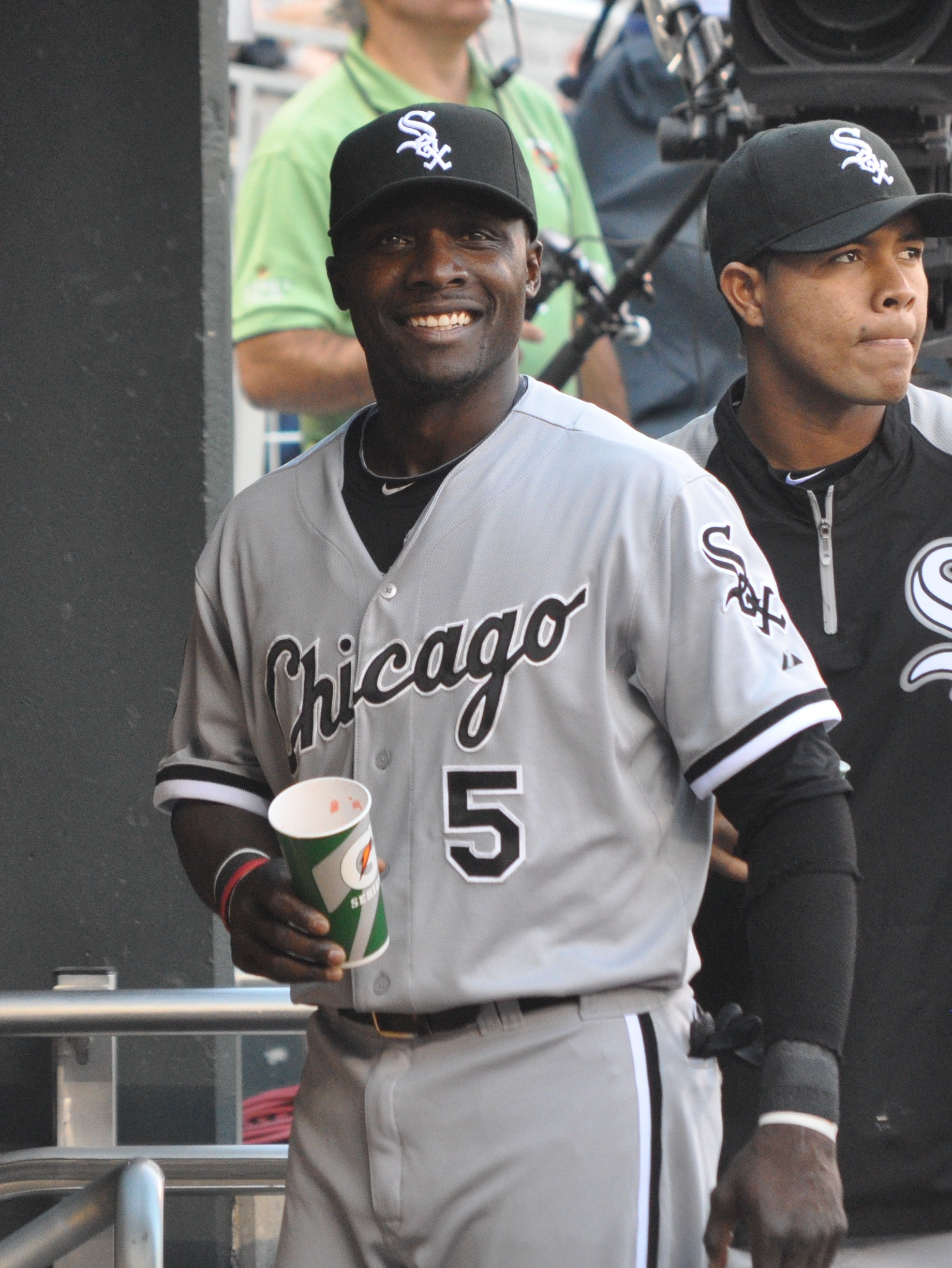
Hudson with the White Sox in 2012

In 2005, Hudson was traded to the Arizona Diamondbacks along with pitcher Miguel Batista for third baseman Troy Glaus and shortstop prospect Sergio Santos.

In the 2006 season, his first full season with Arizona, Hudson set career-highs in batting average with a .287, in home runs with 15, in RBI with 67, and runs scored with 87.

After the 2006 season, Hudson became the recipient of his second career Gold Glove Award, as announced on November 3. Hudson became only the sixth infielder in major league history to win a Gold Glove award in both the American and National Leagues. He was also honored with a Fielding Bible Award as the best fielding second baseman in MLB.

Hudson was selected to his first All-Star Game in 2007, and won his third Gold Glove that season. He also raised his batting average from his previous career-high of .287 set the year before to a .294 clip.

In 2008 Hudson raised his average for the third straight year with a career-best .305 batting average. Hudson missed the last month of the 2008 season, with a dislocated left wrist he suffered against the Atlanta Braves and became a free agent at the end of the season.

=== Los Angeles Dodgers ===
On February 21, 2009, Hudson signed a one-year deal with the Los Angeles Dodgers, reportedly worth $3.4 million (with an additional $4.6 million more in performance bonuses).

On Monday April 13, 2009, Hudson became the eighth Dodger to hit for the cycle, in the 2009 home opener against the San Francisco Giants before a record crowd of 57,099. Hudson was the second Los Angeles Dodger to accomplish this, since Wes Parker in 1970, and the only Los Angeles Dodger to do it at Dodger Stadium. Hudson singled in the first inning, hit a home run in the third inning, doubled in the fourth inning and tripled in the sixth inning. All of Hudson's hits came off of Randy Johnson except for his triple, which was off middle reliever Merkin Valdez.

He was selected to his second All-Star Game and won his fourth Gold Glove Award at the conclusion of the season.

=== Minnesota Twins ===
On February 4, 2010, Hudson signed a 1-year, $5 million deal with the Minnesota Twins. He became the Twins second baseman, replacing Nick Punto and Alexi Casilla. In 126 games, Hudson hit .268 with a career-low .710 OPS.

On April 13, 2010, Hudson hinted that there is racism toward blacks in free agency. He said, "You see guys like Jermaine Dye without a job. Guy with 27 home runs and 81 RBIs and can't get a job. Pretty much sums it up right there, no? You've got some guys who miss a year who can come back and get $5, $6 million and a guy like Jermaine Dye can't get a job. A guy like Gary Sheffield, a first-ballot Hall of Famer, can't get a job."

=== San Diego Padres ===
On December 20, 2010, Hudson signed a 2-year contract with the San Diego Padres worth $11.5 million.

On July 21, 2011, Hudson hit his head against the wall when he caught the ball in foul territory. He found himself unconscious after he hit the wall but avoided a disabled list stint. Through 2011, he had the second-highest career range factor per game of all active major league second basemen, behind Ian Kinsler. He was released by the Padres on May 17, 2012.

=== Chicago White Sox ===
On May 19, 2012, the White Sox agreed to sign Hudson. Hudson finished 2012 with a career-low .204 batting average.

=== 2013 retirement ===
Hudson retired after receiving no interest from MLB teams for the 2013 season. Hudson had made statements that he was "not ready to retire" and stated during the middle of the season that there were discussions with multiple teams, but no offer came.

== Community involvement ==
Hudson founded the C.A.T.C.H. Foundation, a 501c3 organization that seeks to provide resources and a support system for youth coping with autism.

== Family and retirement ==
Hudson married Keisa Carr in the 2008 offseason. He has two daughters and one son.

Hudson currently works for the Diamondbacks as a player development assistant.

== See also ==
- Arizona Diamondbacks award winners and league leaders
- Los Angeles Dodgers award winners and league leaders
- Toronto Blue Jays award winners and league leaders
- List of Major League Baseball annual assists leaders
- List of Major League Baseball career assists leaders
- List of Major League Baseball career double plays leaders
- List of Major League Baseball career games played as a second baseman leaders
- List of Major League Baseball career putouts leaders
- List of Major League Baseball players to hit for the cycle

Achievements
Preceded by Adrián Beltré	Hitting for the cycle April 13, 2009	Succeeded by Ian Kinsler
