= 2015 American League Championship Series =

46th edition of Major League Baseball's American League Championship Series

Team (Wins)	Managers	Season
Kansas City Royals (4)	Ned Yost	95–67 (.586), GA: 12
Toronto Blue Jays (2)	John Gibbons	93–69 (.574), GA: 6
- Dates: October 16–23
- MVP: Alcides Escobar (Kansas City)
- Umpires: John Hirschbeck (crew chief), Laz Díaz, Dan Iassogna, Jeff Nelson, Tony Randazzo (Games 1–2), Jim Reynolds (Games 3–6), and Hunter Wendelstedt

Broadcast
- Television: United States: Fox (Game 1) FS1 (Games 2–6); Canada: Sportsnet
- TV announcers: Joe Buck, Harold Reynolds, Tom Verducci, Ken Rosenthal, and Erin Andrews
- Radio: ESPN
- Radio announcers: Dan Shulman and Aaron Boone
- ALDS: Kansas City Royals over Houston Astros (3–2); Toronto Blue Jays over Texas Rangers (3–2)

The 2015 American League Championship Series (ALCS) was a best-of-seven playoff contested between the top-seeded Kansas City Royals and second-seeded Toronto Blue Jays for the American League (AL) pennant and the right to play in the 2015 World Series. The series is the 46th in league history. The series was broadcast by Fox and Fox Sports 1 in the United States, with Fox airing Game 1 and Fox Sports 1 airing Games 2–6. Sportsnet, a property of Blue Jays owner Rogers Communications, simulcast Fox and Fox Sports 1's coverage in Canada. Game 1 took place on October 16, and the series ended with the Royals winning Game 6 on October 23.

This was the second ALCS matchup between Kansas City and Toronto; the Royals previously rallied from a 3–1 deficit to defeat the Blue Jays in seven games in the 1985 ALCS.

The Royals would go on to defeat the New York Mets in the World Series in five games, winning their first World Series championship in 30 years.

== Background ==
The Kansas City Royals finished the season with a 95–67 record, winning the American League Central division title for the first time since that division was created in 1994. Their season win total was the most since winning 97 games in 1980. The Royals defeated the Houston Astros in five games in the 2015 American League Division Series (ALDS), advancing to their second straight ALCS and eighth overall.

The Toronto Blue Jays made it to the postseason for the first time since winning the 1993 World Series, finishing the season 93–69 to clinch the American League East title. Playing in their first ALDS in team history, the Blue Jays overcame a 2–0 deficit to defeat the Texas Rangers in five games and move on to the ALCS. It was their first ALCS appearance since 1993, and sixth overall.

The Blue Jays won four of seven games against the Royals in the 2015 regular season.

This was the second time in seven ALCS appearances the Royals held home field advantage. The other was 1977, when Kansas City lost Games 4 and 5 of the best-of-5 series at Royals Stadium to the eventual World Series champion New York Yankees.

== Summary ==
Kansas City won the series, 4–2.

Game	Date	Score	Location	Time	Attendance
1	October 16	Toronto Blue Jays – 0, Kansas City Royals – 5	Kauffman Stadium	3:15	39,753
2	October 17	Toronto Blue Jays – 3, Kansas City Royals – 6	Kauffman Stadium	3:19	40,357
3	October 19	Kansas City Royals – 8, Toronto Blue Jays – 11	Rogers Centre	3:13	49,751
4	October 20	Kansas City Royals – 14, Toronto Blue Jays – 2	Rogers Centre	3:39	49,501
5	October 21	Kansas City Royals – 1, Toronto Blue Jays – 7	Rogers Centre	2:56	49,325
6	October 23	Toronto Blue Jays – 3, Kansas City Royals – 4	Kauffman Stadium	3:42 (:45 delay)	40,494

== Game summaries ==
=== Game 1 ===
October 16, 2015 8:07 p.m. (EDT) at Kauffman Stadium in Kansas City, Missouri 52 °F (11 °C), clear
Team	1	2	3	4	5	6	7	8	9	R	H	E
Toronto	0	0	0	0	0	0	0	0	0	0	3	1
Kansas City	0	0	2	1	0	0	0	2	X	5	8	1
WP: Edinson Vólquez (1–0) LP: Marco Estrada (0–1); Home runs: TOR: None; KC: Salvador Pérez (1); Attendance: 39,753; Boxscore

Kansas City opened the scoring in the third inning off of Marco Estrada when Alex Gordon hit a leadoff double and scored on Alcides Escobar's one-out double, then after a groundout, Escobar scored on Lorenzo Cain's single. Salvador Pérez added a home run in the fourth to give the Royals a 3–0 lead. In the eighth, a hit-by-pitch and single off of LaTroy Hawkins was followed by Eric Hosmer's RBI double and Kendrys Morales's sacrifice fly to make it 5–0 Royals. Meanwhile, Edinson Vólquez pitched six scoreless innings, surrendering only two hits to earn his first postseason win. The Royals' touted bullpen completed the shutout, making this just the sixth time all season that Toronto was held to no runs.

=== Game 2 ===
October 17, 2015 4:07 p.m. (EDT) at Kauffman Stadium in Kansas City, Missouri 57 °F (14 °C), sunny
Team	1	2	3	4	5	6	7	8	9	R	H	E
Toronto	0	0	1	0	0	2	0	0	0	3	10	0
Kansas City	0	0	0	0	0	0	5	1	X	6	8	0
WP: Danny Duffy (1–0) LP: David Price (0–1) Sv: Wade Davis (1); Attendance: 40,357; Boxscore

This game marked the fourth time that the Royals rallied back from a multi-run deficit to win in this post-season. The Blue Jays struck first in the third on back-to-back leadoff doubles by Kevin Pillar and Ryan Goins off of starter Yordano Ventura. They made it 3–0 in the sixth when Edwin Encarnacion followed a leadoff single and walk with an RBI single, then Troy Tulowitzki hit a one-out RBI double. Going into the 7th inning, David Price had retired 18 consecutive batters since a leadoff single to Alcides Escobar in the bottom of the first inning. However, Ben Zobrist led off the seventh inning with a pop-up to shallow right field; second baseman Ryan Goins tracked the ball back and waved off charging right fielder José Bautista, but inexplicably ducked out of the way at the last moment and allowed the ball to drop for a single. After Lorenzo Cain singled, Eric Hosmer's single, Kendrys Morales's groundout, and Mike Moustakas's single scored a run each to tie the game. After Salvador Perez struck out, Alex Gordon's RBI double put the Royals up 4–3. Aaron Sanchez relieved Price and allowed an RBI single to Alex Rios. The Royals added another run in the eighth when Moustakas followed back-to-back two-out walks off of Aaron Loup with an RBI single Wade Davis pitched a scoreless ninth despite allowing a leadoff single and walk as the Royals' 6–3 win gave them a 2–0 series lead. This was David Price's seventh consecutive playoff loss, tying him with Randy Johnson for the all-time record. He did record 18 consecutive outs, setting a Blue Jays franchise record.

=== Game 3 ===
October 19, 2015 8:07 p.m. (EDT) at Rogers Centre in Toronto, Ontario 73 °F (23 °C), roof closed
Team	1	2	3	4	5	6	7	8	9	R	H	E
Kansas City	1	0	1	0	2	0	0	0	4	8	15	0
Toronto	0	3	6	0	1	0	0	1	X	11	11	0
WP: Marcus Stroman (1–0) LP: Johnny Cueto (0–1); Home runs: KC: Kendrys Morales (1); TOR: Troy Tulowitzki (1), Josh Donaldson (1), Ryan Goins (1); Attendance: 49,751; Boxscore

Toronto's high powered offense finally came to life in Game 3. After the Royals scored a run in the first off of Marcus Stroman when Alcides Escobar hit a leadoff triple and scored on Ben Zobrist's groundout, Ryan Goins's single with runners on second and third put the Blue Jays up 2–1 in the third. After a walk, Josh Donaldson's RBI single made it 3–1 Blue Jays. The Royals cut the lead to 3–2 in the third when Eric Hosmer hit into a forceout at second with runners on first and third, but the Blue Jays blew the game open in the bottom half. After a leadoff single and walk, Troy Tulowitzki's three-run home run made it 6–2 Blue Jays. Russell Martin then walked and scored on Kevin Pillar's double. Kris Medlen relieved Cueto and after getting two outs, allowed a home run to Josh Donaldson to make it 9–2. In the fifth, Stroman's wild pitch with runners on second and third made it 9–3, then after a walk, Mike Moustakas's RBI single made it 9–4 Blue Jays, who added another run in the bottom of the inning on Ryan Goins's home run. They added another run in the eighth on José Bautista's RBI single with two on off of Franklin Morales. In the ninth, Liam Hendriks allowed a leadoff single and subsequent double. After Lorenzo Cain's sacrifice fly and Hosmer's single scored a run each, Roberto Osuna relieved Hendriks and allowed a two-run home run to Kendrys Morales before retiring the next two batters to end the game.

=== Game 4 ===
October 20, 2015 4:07 p.m. (EDT) at Rogers Centre in Toronto, Ontario 73 °F (23 °C), roof closed
Team	1	2	3	4	5	6	7	8	9	R	H	E
Kansas City	4	1	0	0	0	0	4	3	2	14	15	0
Toronto	0	0	2	0	0	0	0	0	0	2	7	0
WP: Luke Hochevar (1–0) LP: R. A. Dickey (0–1); Home runs: KC: Ben Zobrist (1), Alex Ríos (1); TOR: None; Attendance: 49,501; Boxscore

The Royals got to Toronto starter R. A. Dickey early in Game 4, with a two-run home run from the second batter of the game, Ben Zobrist. After a walk, stolen base, and single, a passed ball scored another run for the Royals, then after a groundout, Mike Moustakas's sacrifice fly made it 4–0. Alex Rios's home run made it 5–0 next inning and Dickey was pulled from the game after allowing a walk and hit-by-pitch. Kansas City put up 5 total runs in the first 2 innings to chase Dickey from the game. Liam Hendriks entered in as the long reliever for the Blue Jays and pitched 4 1/3 scoreless innings from the second to the sixth and finished with 13 outs from 12 batters faced, breaking the playoff record for more-outs-than-batters-faced performances. Jim Lindsey previously held the mark with eight outs from seven batters faced in 1930, while playing for the St. Louis Cardinals.

Royals starter Chris Young, who had split time in the starting rotation and the bullpen, pitched 4 2/3 innings. The Blue Jays scored their only runs of the game in the third on Josh Donaldson's ground-rule double with runners on first and second followed by José Bautista's sacrifice fly. Kansas City's bullpen then shut the Blue Jays down for the rest of the game. Meanwhile, the Royals' offense exploded, adding nine runs in the final three innings.

In the seventh, after LaTroy Hawkins allowed a walk and two singles to load the bases with no outs, Alcides Escobar hit a sacrifice fly off of Ryan Tepera, who then threw a wild pitch to let another run score. After Ben Zobrist walked, Lorenzo Cain's RBI single and Eric Hosmer's sacrifice fly scored a run each. Next inning, the Royals loaded the bases off of Tepera when Escobar hit another sacrifice fly, then a single reloaded the bases before Cain's two-run single made it 12–2 Royals.

In an effort to save his bullpen and to the amusement of some fans and players, Toronto manager John Gibbons elected to bring utility infielder Cliff Pennington to pitch the top of the ninth with two on and two outs. This marked the first time that a position player pitched in a playoff game. Pennington allowed a single to load the bases before Escobar's two-run single capped the game's scoring at 14–2 Royals. Franklin Morales pitched a scoreless bottom of the ninth to give the Royals a 3–1 series lead.

=== Game 5 ===
October 21, 2015 4:07 p.m. (EDT) at Rogers Centre in Toronto, Ontario 73 °F (23 °C), roof closed
Team	1	2	3	4	5	6	7	8	9	R	H	E
Kansas City	0	0	0	0	0	0	0	1	0	1	4	0
Toronto	0	1	0	0	0	4	1	1	X	7	8	0
WP: Marco Estrada (1–1) LP: Edinson Vólquez (1–1); Home runs: KC: Salvador Pérez (2); TOR: Chris Colabello (1); Attendance: 49,325; Boxscore

Game 5 appeared to be a pitchers' duel early on. Toronto starter Marco Estrada and Kansas City starter Edinson Vólquez dominated early on, with the first run of the game on Chris Colabello's home run in the second. Things began to unwind for Volquez in the bottom of the sixth as he walked two batters and hit a third to load the bases. Volquez then walked Edwin Encarnación to force in a run. With Troy Tulowitzki coming to the plate, Royals manager Ned Yost opted to pull Volquez in favor of Kelvin Herrera; however, Tulowitzki promptly lined a bases-clearing double off the center-field wall to make the score 5–0. That proved to be more than enough for Estrada, who only surrendered a home run from Salvador Pérez with two outs in the eighth in his 7 2/3 innings of work. The Blue Jays added to their lead off of Danny Duffy, who allowed back-to-back two-out doubles in the seventh to Josh Donaldson and José Bautista, then a one-out single to Tulowitzki in the eighth and RBI double to Kevin Pillar. Roberto Osuna pitched a perfect ninth to keep Toronto's season alive and send the series back to Kansas City.

This would be the final postseason game played with sliding pits instead of a traditional full dirt infield, as the Blue Jays would install a new dirt infield at Rogers Centre prior to the start of the 2016 season.

=== Game 6 ===
October 23, 2015 8:07 p.m. (EDT) at Kauffman Stadium in Kansas City, Missouri 70 °F (21 °C), increasing cloudiness
Team	1	2	3	4	5	6	7	8	9	R	H	E
Toronto	0	0	0	1	0	0	0	2	0	3	7	0
Kansas City	1	1	0	0	0	0	1	1	X	4	9	0
WP: Wade Davis (1–0) LP: Roberto Osuna (0–1); Home runs: TOR: José Bautista 2 (2); KC: Ben Zobrist (2), Mike Moustakas (1); Attendance: 40,494; Boxscore

Ben Zobrist opened the scoring two batters into the bottom of the 1st with a home run to left field off of David Price. Mike Moustakas added another home run for Kansas City in the 2nd inning, but this one was not without controversy. It was a liner right at the right-center field wall, where a fan reached out and caught the ball at the top corner of the wall. The ball was initially ruled a home run, but Toronto wanted the play reviewed. The Fox commentary crew of Joe Buck, Harold Reynolds, and Tom Verducci seemed confident that the ruling would be overturned, but the ruling of a home run stood with the play being too close to overturn. Buck, Reynolds, and Verducci would later call it a good call by the reviewing crew upon viewing further replays and upon fully understanding the configuration of the outfield wall, but debated the call several times throughout the broadcast.

Toronto got on the board in the fourth when José Bautista blasted a home run off the Royals Hall of Fame sign in left field. The Blue Jays would threaten again in the fifth when starter Yordano Ventura gave up consecutive walks to lead off the inning. However, he settled down and induced two pop-outs, which then brought up eventual AL MVP Josh Donaldson. Donaldson hit a hard line-drive towards 3rd base, but Moustakas was able to come up with a spectacular diving catch to end the inning.

In the bottom of the seventh, Moustakas reached base on a broken bat blooper to center-field. Salvador Pérez next hit a deep fly ball to left field. Left fielder Ben Revere then one-upped Moustakas' earlier catch with a leaping catch at the top of the left-field wall. Revere then tried to double up Moustakas at 1st, but Moustakas got back in time to leave it at one out. Ryan Goins then kept the good defense going by making a sliding stop on a hard Alex Gordon grounder to get Gordon out at 1st, to make it two outs, but Moustakas reached 2nd on the play. At this point David Price was taken out of the game in favor of right hander Aaron Sanchez to face Alex Ríos. On a 1–2 pitch, Rios hammered a ball to left field for a single that drove in Moustakas to give Kansas City a 3–1 lead.

In the top of the eighth, Kansas City manager Ned Yost brought in Ryan Madson to get the Royals through the inning after Kelvin Herrera kept Toronto scoreless for the last 1 2/3 innings. Yost would say after the game he put in Madson because of the impending rain: he didn't want to bring in closer Wade Davis early in case there was a lengthy rain delay which could prevent him from pitching the 9th. Revere hit a high chopper to Alcides Escobar and beat the throw to 1st base for a lead-off infield single. Up next was Josh Donaldson, but he remained hitless on the night when Madson got him to strike out for the first out. Madson faced Bautista next who promptly blasted a two-run home run down the left-field line to tie the game at 3. Madson then walked Edwin Encarnación, forcing Yost to pull Madson from the game in favor of Wade Davis. Davis induced a pop-out from Chris Colabello, before throwing a wild pitch against Troy Tulowitzki which allowed Encarnacion to advance to 2nd. It was only Davis' second wild pitch of the season. Facing a 3–2 count against Tulowitzki, the rain started to fall in Kansas City. Davis got Tulowitzki to swing and miss for a strike out to end the inning, but Yost's fears came true as the grounds crew brought out the tarp for a rain delay, meaning Davis would have a lengthy wait between pitching appearances if he was even able to return depending on the length of the delay.

After a 45-minute rain delay, Toronto manager John Gibbons sent out closer Roberto Osuna to pitch the bottom of the eighth. Lorenzo Cain worked an 8-pitch walk to get on base. Eric Hosmer was up next and worked a 2-2 count before driving a ball to the right field corner for a hit, and Cain ran on contact. Bautista fielded the ball and threw to second while Cain was flying around the base. As soon as Royals third base coach Mike Jirschele saw Bautista throw to 2nd, he waved Cain home. By the time the throw reached second base, Cain was already well past third and by the time Tulowitzki's throw to home reached catcher Russell Martin, Cain was sliding past home for the go-ahead run. It was the second time of the 2015 post-season that Cain had scored from first base on a single from Hosmer. On the play, Cain went from 1st to home in under 10.5 seconds.

Davis came back in to pitch the top of the ninth after having waited just over an hour between in-game pitches. Martin greeted Davis with his first hit of the series on a single to center-field. Dalton Pompey then came in to run for Martin and promptly stole 2nd base to put the tying run in scoring position. Then on a 2–2 pitch into the dirt to Kevin Pillar, Pompey stole third and Perez could not scoop up the ball to even make a throw. That put a runner on third with no outs and a 3–2 count to Pillar. After a foul ball, Davis missed on a pitch inside to walk Pillar to put runners on the corners with no outs. Dioner Navarro came in to pinch-hit for Goins with Toronto needing a catcher to replace Martin. On a 1–1 pitch, Davis got a called strike that was high and outside. The Toronto dugout not only started complaining about that, but they believed Davis should've been called for a quick pitch balk, which would have brought the tying run home. Instead it was a 1–2 count and Davis got Navarro to swing and miss for the first out. However, Pillar stole 2nd on the pitch to leave the Royals without a double-play chance and thus putting two runners in scoring position. That brought up Revere who worked a 2-1 count when Davis threw a called strike, which appeared to be a ball, to make it a 2–2 count. On the next pitch, Revere swung and missed for the second strikeout of the inning, bringing up Donaldson with two runners in scoring position in a 4–3 game. On a 2–1 pitch Donaldson grounded out to 3rd for the final out to clinch back-to-back AL Pennants for the Kansas City Royals.

Alcides Escobar, who batted .478 in the series with 2 doubles and a triple, was named 2015 ALCS MVP.

=== Composite line score ===
2015 ALCS (4–2): Kansas City Royals beat Toronto Blue Jays

Team	1	2	3	4	5	6	7	8	9	R	H	E
Toronto Blue Jays	0	4	9	1	1	6	1	4	0	26	46	1
Kansas City Royals	6	2	3	1	2	0	10	8	6	38	59	1
Total attendance: 269,181 Average attendance: 44,864
