= List of Silver Slugger Award winners at second base =

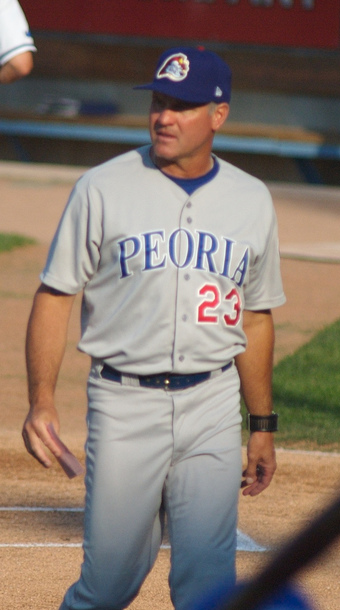
Ryne Sandberg has the most wins among National League second basemen with seven Silver Slugger Awards.

The Silver Slugger Award is awarded annually to the best offensive player at each position in both the American League (AL) and the National League (NL), as determined by the coaches and managers of Major League Baseball (MLB). These voters consider several offensive categories in selecting the winners, including batting average, slugging percentage, and on-base percentage, in addition to "coaches' and managers' general impressions of a player's overall offensive value". Managers and coaches are not permitted to vote for players on their own team. The Silver Slugger was first awarded in 1980 and is given by Hillerich & Bradsby, the manufacturer of Louisville Slugger bats. The award is a bat-shaped trophy, 3 feet (91 cm) tall, engraved with the names of each of the winners from the league and plated with sterling silver.

Among second basemen, Ryne Sandberg, who played 15 seasons with the Chicago Cubs in his 16-year career, is tied for the most Silver Sluggers all-time with seven wins, and is first among all National League second basemen, including five consecutive from 1988 to 1992. Three other National League players have won the award four times. Jeff Kent (2000–2002, 2005) won three consecutive awards with the San Francisco Giants, before adding a fourth with the Los Angeles Dodgers; Craig Biggio, who played his entire career with the Houston Astros, won the award four times as a second baseman (1994–1995, 1997–1998) after winning another as a catcher. Chase Utley followed Kent's last win by capturing four consecutive awards (2006–2009).

In the American League, Jose Altuve has also won seven Silver Slugger awards, tied for the most all-time, including five consecutive awards (2014–2018). Altuve's seven Silver Slugger awards are the most among American League winners, ahead of Robinson Canó who is a five-time winner. Roberto Alomar won the award at the same position with three different teams (Baltimore Orioles, Toronto Blue Jays, Cleveland Indians). Julio Franco won four consecutive awards (1988–1991) with two different teams, and Lou Whitaker won four awards in five years (1983–1985, 1987) with the Detroit Tigers.

DJ LeMahieu holds the record for the highest batting average and slugging percentage in a second baseman's Silver Slugger-winning season with the respective .364 and .590 marks he set in the pandemic-shortened 2020 season. In the National League, Luis Arraez's .354 batting average in 2023 ranks first. Willie Randolph, who won the inaugural award in the 1980 season, set a record for on-base percentage (.427) that has not yet been broken. Chuck Knoblauch is second behind Randolph in the American League with a .424 on-base percentage, a mark that was tied by Jeff Kent in 2000 to set the National League record. That year, Kent also set the record among second basemen for highest slugging percentage (.596) and the National League record for runs batted in (125). Bret Boone is the overall leader in runs batted in (141); this record was established in 2001. Marcus Semien hit 45 home runs in 2021, the most ever by a second baseman in a winning season, while Sandberg set the National League mark with 40 in 1990. Jose Altuve collected 225 hits in 2014, the most in a season for a second baseman in the post-integration era.

== Key ==
Year	Links to the corresponding Major League Baseball season
AVG	Batting average
OBP	On-base percentage
SLG	Slugging percentage
HR	Home runs
RBI	Runs batted in
Ref	References
*	Winner of the most Silver Sluggers in Major League Baseball as a second baseman
†	Member of the National Baseball Hall of Fame and Museum

== American League winners ==
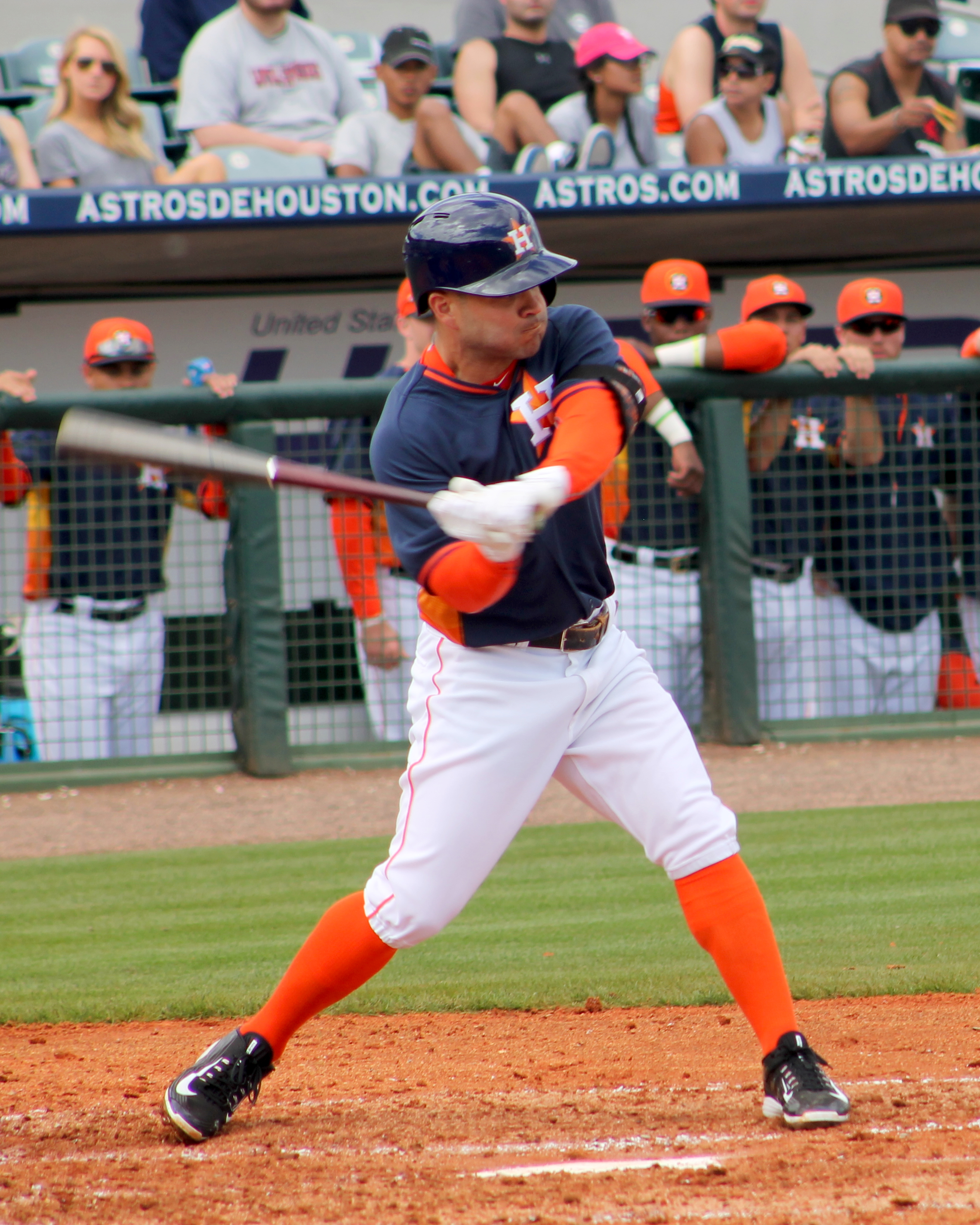
Jose Altuve has the most wins among American League second basemen with seven Silver Slugger Awards.

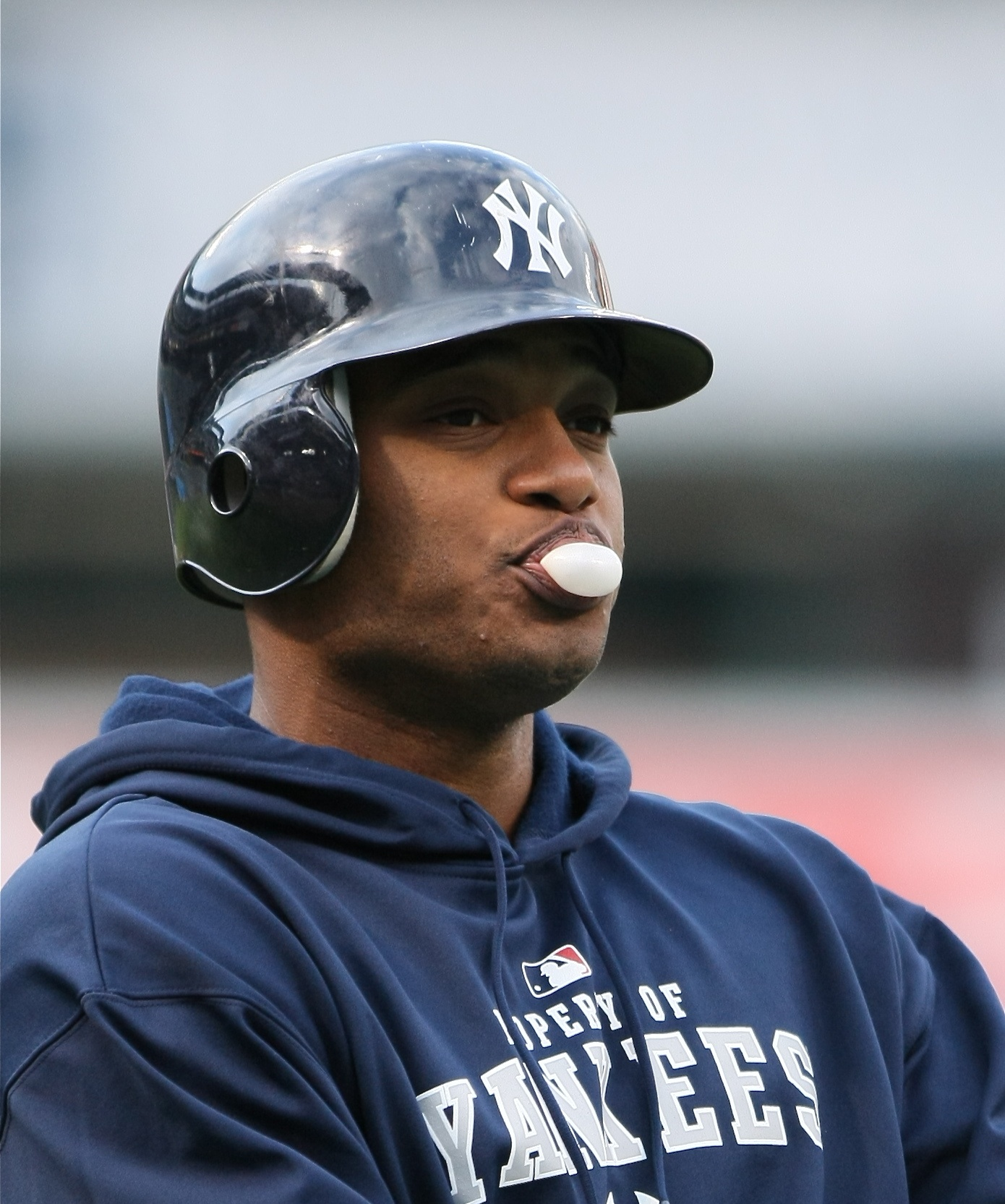
Robinson Canó, along with Jose Altuve and Roberto Alomar, each have the longest gap between Silver Slugger Award wins at second base with three seasons.

Year	Player	Team	AVG	OBP	SLG	HR	RBI	Ref
1980	Willie Randolph	New York Yankees	.294	.427	.407	7	46	
1981	Bobby Grich	California Angels	.271	.377	.408	22	61	
1982	Dámaso García	Toronto Blue Jays	.310	.338	.399	5	42	
1983	Lou Whitaker	Detroit Tigers	.320	.380	.457	12	72	
1984	Lou Whitaker (2)	Detroit Tigers	.289	.357	.407	12	72	
1985	Lou Whitaker (3)	Detroit Tigers	.279	.362	.456	21	73	
1986	Frank White	Kansas City Royals	.272	.322	.465	22	84	
1987	Lou Whitaker (4)	Detroit Tigers	.265	.341	.427	16	59	
1988	Julio Franco	Cleveland Indians	.303	.361	.409	10	54	
1989	Julio Franco (2)	Texas Rangers	.316	.386	.462	13	92	
1990	Julio Franco (3)	Texas Rangers	.296	.383	.402	11	69	
1991	Julio Franco (4)	Texas Rangers	.341	.408	.474	15	78	
1992	Roberto Alomar^{†}	Toronto Blue Jays	.310	.405	.427	8	76	
1993	Carlos Baerga	Cleveland Indians	.321	.355	.486	21	114	
1994	Carlos Baerga (2)	Cleveland Indians	.314	.333	.525	19	80	
1995	Chuck Knoblauch	Minnesota Twins	.333	.424	.487	11	63	
1996	Roberto Alomar^{†} (2)	Baltimore Orioles	.328	.411	.527	22	94	
1997	Chuck Knoblauch (2)	Minnesota Twins	.291	.390	.411	9	58	
1998	Damion Easley	Detroit Tigers	.271	.332	.478	27	100	
1999	Roberto Alomar^{†} (3)	Cleveland Indians	.323	.422	.533	24	120	
2000	Roberto Alomar^{†} (4)	Cleveland Indians	.310	.378	.475	19	89	
2001	Bret Boone	Seattle Mariners	.331	.372	.578	37	141	
2002	Alfonso Soriano	New York Yankees	.300	.332	.547	39	102	
2003	Bret Boone (2)	Seattle Mariners	.294	.366	.535	35	117	
2004	Alfonso Soriano (2)	Texas Rangers	.280	.324	.484	28	91	
2005	Alfonso Soriano (3)	Texas Rangers	.268	.309	.512	36	104	
2006	Robinson Canó	New York Yankees	.342	.365	.525	15	78	
2007	Plácido Polanco	Detroit Tigers	.341	.388	.458	9	67	
2008	Dustin Pedroia	Boston Red Sox	.326	.376	.493	17	83	
2009	Aaron Hill	Toronto Blue Jays	.286	.330	.499	36	108	
2010	Robinson Canó (2)	New York Yankees	.319	.381	.534	29	109	
2011	Robinson Canó (3)	New York Yankees	.302	.349	.533	28	118	
2012	Robinson Canó (4)	New York Yankees	.313	.379	.550	33	94	
2013	Robinson Canó (5)	New York Yankees	.314	.383	.516	27	107	
2014	Jose Altuve*	Houston Astros	.341	.377	.453	7	59	
2015	Jose Altuve* (2)	Houston Astros	.313	.353	.459	15	66	
2016	Jose Altuve* (3)	Houston Astros	.338	.396	.531	24	96	
2017	Jose Altuve* (4)	Houston Astros	.346	.410	.547	24	81	
2018	Jose Altuve* (5)	Houston Astros	.316	.386	.451	13	61	
2019	DJ LeMahieu	New York Yankees	.327	.375	.518	26	102	
2020	DJ LeMahieu (2)	New York Yankees	.364	.421	.590	10	27	
2021	Marcus Semien	Toronto Blue Jays	.265	.334	.538	45	102	
2022	Jose Altuve* (6)	Houston Astros	.300	.387	.533	28	57	
2023	Marcus Semien (2)	Texas Rangers	.276	.348	.478	29	100	
2024	Jose Altuve* (7)	Houston Astros	.295	.350	.439	20	65	
2025	Jazz Chisholm Jr.	New York Yankees	.242	.332	.481	31	80	
2026	Chase Meidroth	Chicago White Sox	.276	.350	.415	16	63	

== National League winners ==
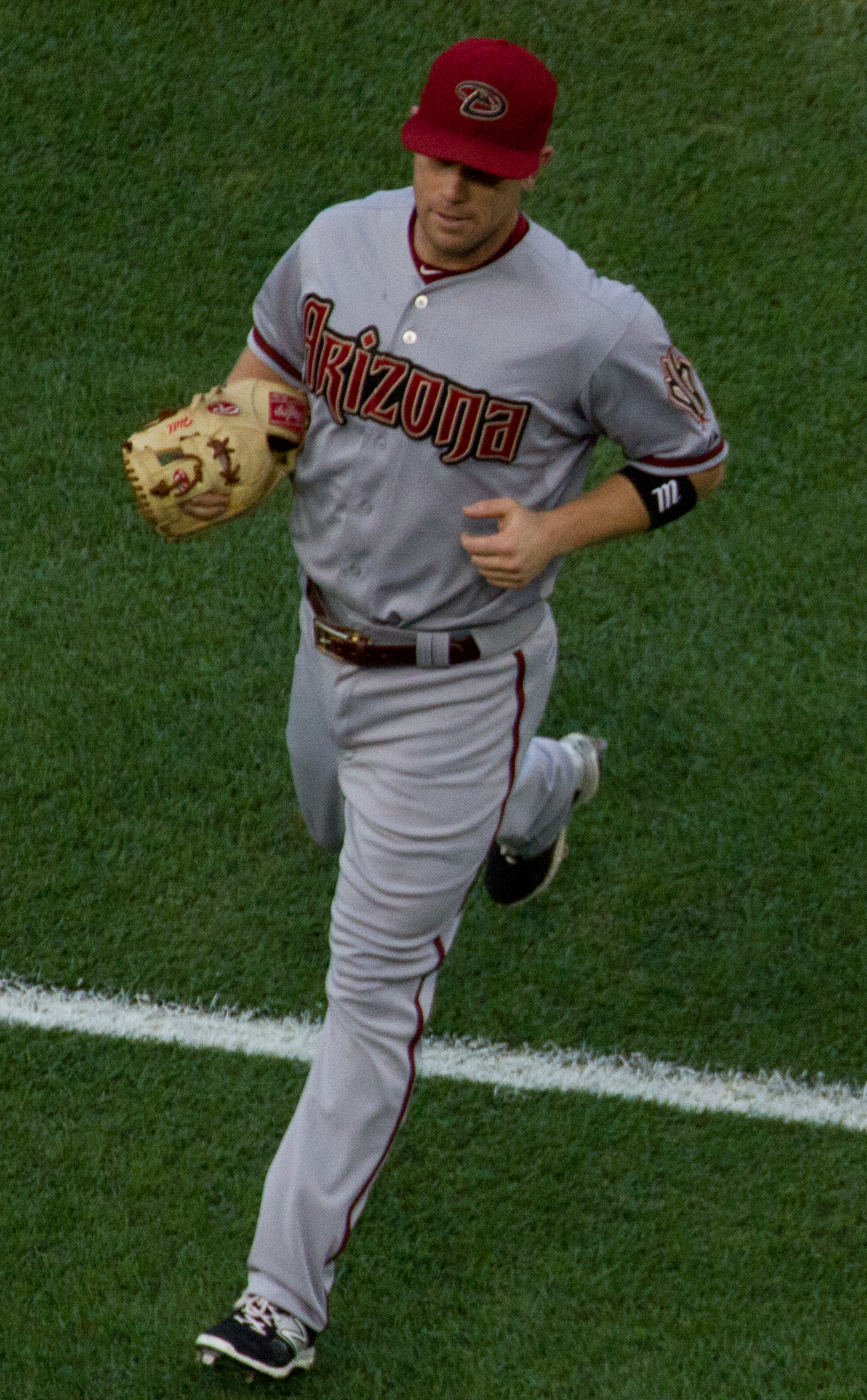
Aaron Hill won the 2009 American League Silver Slugger for second basemen, and in 2012 he won the award in the National League, becoming the only player to win in both leagues.

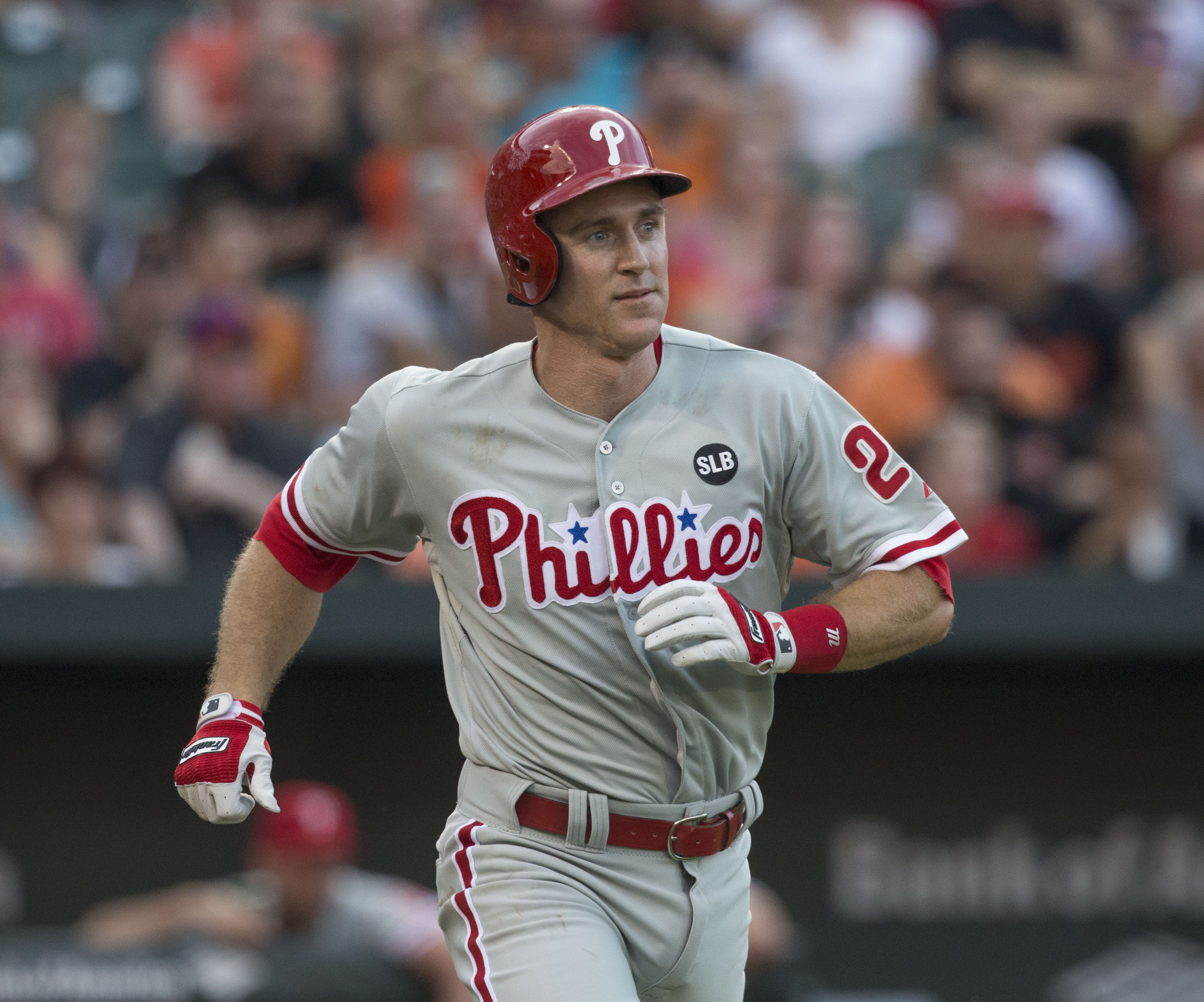
Chase Utley won four consecutive NL Silver Slugger Awards at second base (2006–2009).

Year	Player	Team	AVG	OBP	SLG	HR	RBI	Ref
1980	Manny Trillo	Philadelphia Phillies	.292	.334	.412	7	43	
1981	Manny Trillo (2)	Philadelphia Phillies	.287	.338	.395	6	36	
1982	Joe Morgan^{†}	San Francisco Giants	.292	.417	.435	16	73	
1983	Johnny Ray	Pittsburgh Pirates	.283	.323	.399	5	53	
1984	Ryne Sandberg*^{†}	Chicago Cubs	.314	.367	.520	19	84	
1985	Ryne Sandberg*^{†} (2)	Chicago Cubs	.305	.364	.504	26	83	
1986	Steve Sax	Los Angeles Dodgers	.332	.390	.441	6	56	
1987	Juan Samuel	Philadelphia Phillies	.272	.335	.502	28	100	
1988	Ryne Sandberg*^{†} (3)	Chicago Cubs	.264	.322	.419	19	69	
1989	Ryne Sandberg*^{†} (4)	Chicago Cubs	.290	.356	.497	30	76	
1990	Ryne Sandberg*^{†} (5)	Chicago Cubs	.306	.354	.559	40	100	
1991	Ryne Sandberg*^{†} (6)	Chicago Cubs	.291	.379	.485	26	100	
1992	Ryne Sandberg*^{†} (7)	Chicago Cubs	.304	.371	.510	26	87	
1993	Robby Thompson	San Francisco Giants	.312	.375	.496	19	65	
1994	Craig Biggio^{†}	Houston Astros	.318	.411	.483	6	56	
1995	Craig Biggio^{†} (2)	Houston Astros	.302	.406	.483	22	77	
1996	Eric Young	Colorado Rockies	.324	.393	.421	8	74	
1997	Craig Biggio^{†} (3)	Houston Astros	.309	.415	.501	22	81	
1998	Craig Biggio^{†} (4)	Houston Astros	.325	.403	.503	20	88	
1999	Edgardo Alfonzo	New York Mets	.304	.385	.502	27	108	
2000	Jeff Kent^{†}	San Francisco Giants	.334	.424	.596	33	125	
2001	Jeff Kent^{†} (2)	San Francisco Giants	.298	.369	.507	22	106	
2002	Jeff Kent^{†} (3)	San Francisco Giants	.313	.368	.565	37	108	
2003	José Vidro	Montreal Expos	.310	.397	.470	15	65	
2004	Mark Loretta	San Diego Padres	.335	.391	.495	16	76	
2005	Jeff Kent^{†} (4)	Los Angeles Dodgers	.289	.377	.512	29	105	
2006	Chase Utley	Philadelphia Phillies	.309	.379	.527	32	102	
2007	Chase Utley (2)	Philadelphia Phillies	.332	.410	.566	22	103	
2008	Chase Utley (3)	Philadelphia Phillies	.292	.380	.535	33	104	
2009	Chase Utley (4)	Philadelphia Phillies	.282	.397	.508	31	93	
2010	Dan Uggla	Florida Marlins	.287	.369	.508	33	105	
2011	Brandon Phillips	Cincinnati Reds	.300	.353	.457	18	82	
2012	Aaron Hill (2)	Arizona Diamondbacks	.302	.360	.522	26	85	
2013	Matt Carpenter	St. Louis Cardinals	.318	.392	.481	11	78	
2014	Neil Walker	Pittsburgh Pirates	.271	.342	.467	23	76	
2015	Dee Gordon (Note: Changed last name to Dee Strange-Gordon in 2020.)	Miami Marlins	.333	.359	.418	4	46	
2016	Daniel Murphy	Washington Nationals	.347	.390	.595	25	104	
2017	Daniel Murphy (2)	Washington Nationals	.322	.384	.543	23	93	
2018	Javier Báez	Chicago Cubs	.290	.326	.554	34	111	
2019	Ozzie Albies	Atlanta Braves	.295	.352	.500	24	86	
2020	Donovan Solano	San Francisco Giants	.326	.365	.463	3	29	
2021	Ozzie Albies (2)	Atlanta Braves	.259	.310	.488	30	106	
2022	Jeff McNeil	New York Mets	.326	.382	.454	9	62	
2023	Luis Arráez	Miami Marlins	.354	.393	.469	10	69	
2024	Ketel Marte	Arizona Diamondbacks	.292	.372	.560	36	95	
2025	Ketel Marte (2)	Arizona Diamondbacks	.283	.376	.517	28	72	
2026	Brandon Lowe	Pittsburgh Pirates	.260	.331	.493	35	96	

== See also ==
- List of Gold Glove Award winners at second base
