= Brandon Phillips =

American baseball player (born 1981)

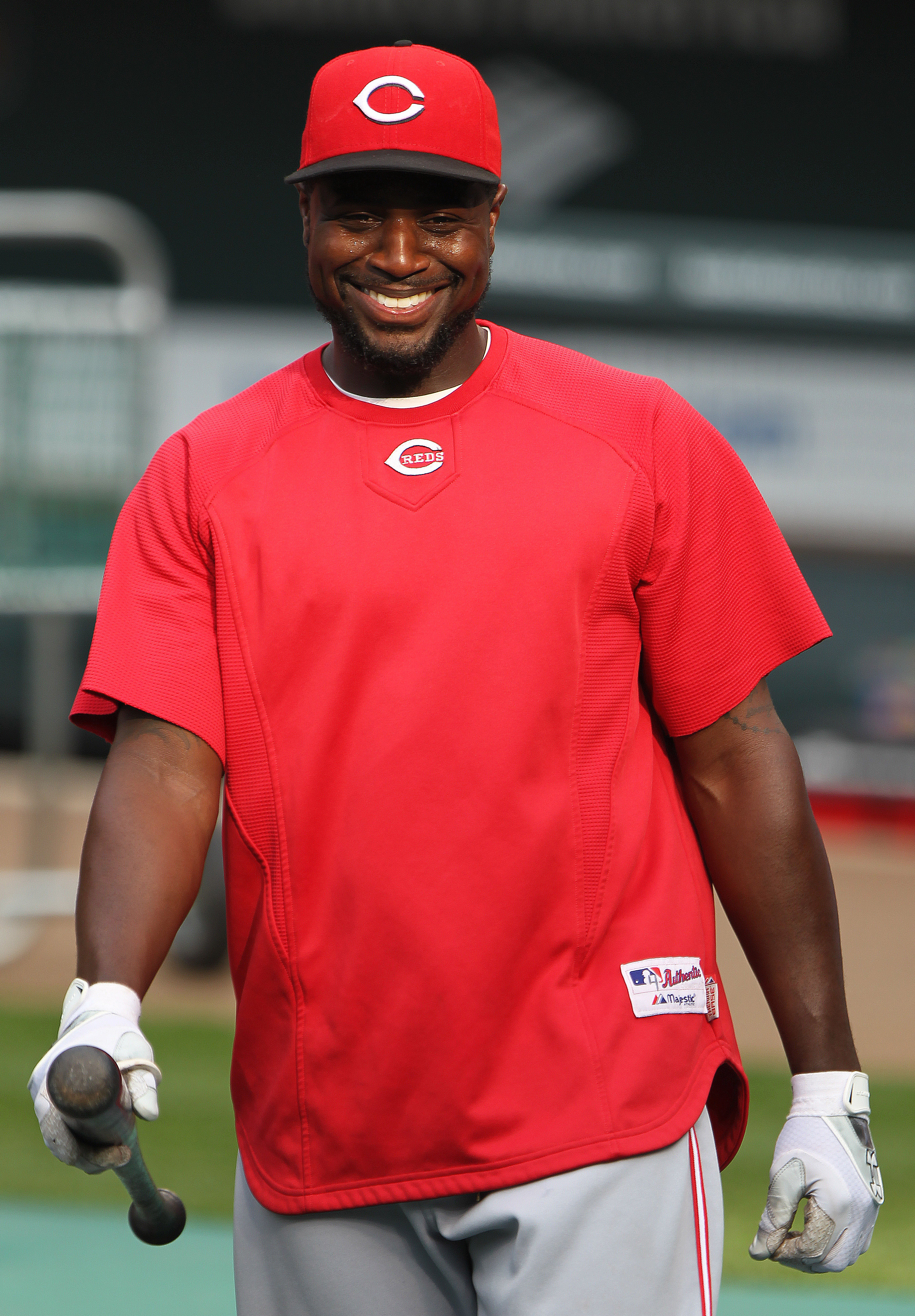
- Phillips with the Cincinnati Reds in 2011
- Second baseman
- Born: June 28, 1981 (age 44); Raleigh, North Carolina, U.S.
- Batted: Right Threw: Right

MLB debut
- September 13, 2002, for the Cleveland Indians

Last MLB appearance
- September 30, 2018, for the Boston Red Sox

MLB statistics
- Batting average: .275
- Hits: 2,029
- Home runs: 211
- Runs batted in: 951
- Stats at Baseball Reference

Teams
- Cleveland Indians (2002–2005); Cincinnati Reds (2006–2016); Atlanta Braves (2017); Los Angeles Angels (2017); Boston Red Sox (2018)

Career highlights and awards
- 3× All-Star (2010, 2011, 2013); 4× Gold Glove Award (2008, 2010, 2011, 2013); Silver Slugger Award (2011); Cincinnati Reds Hall of Fame

Brandon Emil Phillips (born June 28, 1981) is an American former professional baseball second baseman. He played in Major League Baseball (MLB) for the Cleveland Indians, Cincinnati Reds, Atlanta Braves, Los Angeles Angels and Boston Red Sox. At 6 feet (1.8 m) and 211 pounds (96 kg), Phillips batted and threw right-handed.

Phillips was drafted by the Montreal Expos in 1999. In 2002, while in the minor leagues of the Montreal organization, he was traded to the Cleveland Indians. After making his major league debut that same year for the Indians, he spent several years moving back and forth between the Indians and the minor leagues. Phillips was traded to the Cincinnati Reds in 2006. After joining the Reds, Phillips developed into one of the best second basemen in baseball. In Cincinnati, he won four Rawlings Gold Glove Awards, one Silver Slugger Award, and was selected to three National League All-Star teams.

== Early life ==
Phillips' father, James Phillips, runs the Phillips Baseball Center in Pine Lake, Georgia. His sister is former WNBA player Porsha Phillips and his younger brother PJ Phillips is a former manager of the Lexington Legends of the Atlantic League of Professional Baseball. His oldest brother, and first Phillips drafted to MLB, Jamil Phillips, currently owns and operates, Legacy Arena Baseballin Snellville, Georgia.

Phillips attended Redan High School in Stone Mountain, Georgia, where he played basketball and baseball. His #7 at Redan was retired by the school in December 2003. He was the star baseball player at his high school. Phillips' favorite baseball player growing up was Cincinnati Reds shortstop Barry Larkin.

Phillips was selected in the second round of the 1999 MLB draft by the Montreal Expos as a shortstop after signing a letter of intent to play both baseball and football at the University of Georgia. He instead signed with the Expos on June 21, 1999.

== Professional career ==
=== Cleveland Indians ===
After several years in the Expos farm system, Phillips was part of a six-player trade that sent him from the Montreal Expos to the Cleveland Indians on June 27, 2002. Phillips was dealt with Grady Sizemore, Cliff Lee, and Lee Stevens in exchange for Bartolo Colón and Tim Drew.

In 2003, Phillips won the starting job at second base for the Indians. During the season, he had a season-high six-game hitting streak. Against the Detroit Tigers on May 20, he hit the first three-run walk-off home run of his career. After that he went 0-for-29 and was sent down to the Triple-A Buffalo Bisons after the All-Star break. He was recalled soon after that due to an injury to one of his teammates and finished the season with a .208 average, six homers, 33 RBIs and four stolen bases. Phillips also totaled a .981 fielding percentage.

In 2004, he started the season in Buffalo. He hit .303 with 14 stolen bases on the season and recorded 18-game and 16-game hitting streaks. In the minor league play-offs, Phillips hit .308. He joined the Indians at the end of the season and played six games for them.

Phillips remained with the Bisons for most of 2005. He appeared in six games for the Indians in July but was sent back down following the stint.

In his four seasons with the Indians, Phillips appeared in 135 major league games, batting .206 with six home runs and 38 RBIs.

=== Cincinnati Reds ===
==== 2006 ====
On April 7, 2006, Cleveland's frustration with Phillips' slow progress peaked and he was traded to the Cincinnati Reds for a player to be named later (pitcher Jeff Stevens). He made an immediate impact, starting the season by being named NL Player of the Week the same month he was acquired by the Reds, hitting .452 (14–31) with three home runs and 17 runs batted in for the week of April 17–23. Phillips' 17 RBI were the most for an NL Player of the Week since Sammy Sosa had 19 RBI the week of August 4–10, 2002. Phillips had his first career grand slam that month and 16 straight stolen bases. leading the Reds in hits (148) and multi-hit games (36). He also led all National League second basemen in stolen bases with 25. Phillips produced two nine-game hitting streaks over the season and finished with a batting average of .276, 17 home runs and 75 RBI.

==== 2007 ====
In 2007, Phillips hit 30 home runs and stole 32 bases to become the first Reds second baseman to join the 30–30 club and just the third 30–30 Red, joining Eric Davis (37 HR, 50 SB in 1987) and Barry Larkin (33 HR, 36 SB in 1996). He also joined Alfonso Soriano as just the second second baseman in the 30–30 club.

In the fourth inning on August 1, against John Lannan of the Washington Nationals, Phillips stole two bases on one pitch while the Nationals had a shift on Adam Dunn. On August 30, Phillips made the play of the month to win the game for the Reds against the Pittsburgh Pirates. With the Reds winning 5–4 in the bottom of the ninth, Nate McLouth of the Pirates hit a single into right field. The runner from second, Josh Phelps, appeared likely to score, but Phillips grabbed the ball in shallow right field bare-handed and threw Phelps out at home plate to win the game. On September 5, he hit his 28th home run of the season, breaking the Reds' single-season record for home runs by a second baseman, formerly held by Joe Morgan. On September 26, 2007, Phillips hit his 30th home run of the season.

In addition to the home runs and steals, Phillips ended the 2007 season with 187 hits, 107 runs, 26 doubles, six triples, 94 RBIs, and a .288 batting average. He led the Reds in runs, hits, triples, and stolen bases and was second on the team in doubles and home runs.

Phillips received a four-year, $27 million contract extension on February 15, 2008, instead of going to arbitration.

==== 2008 ====
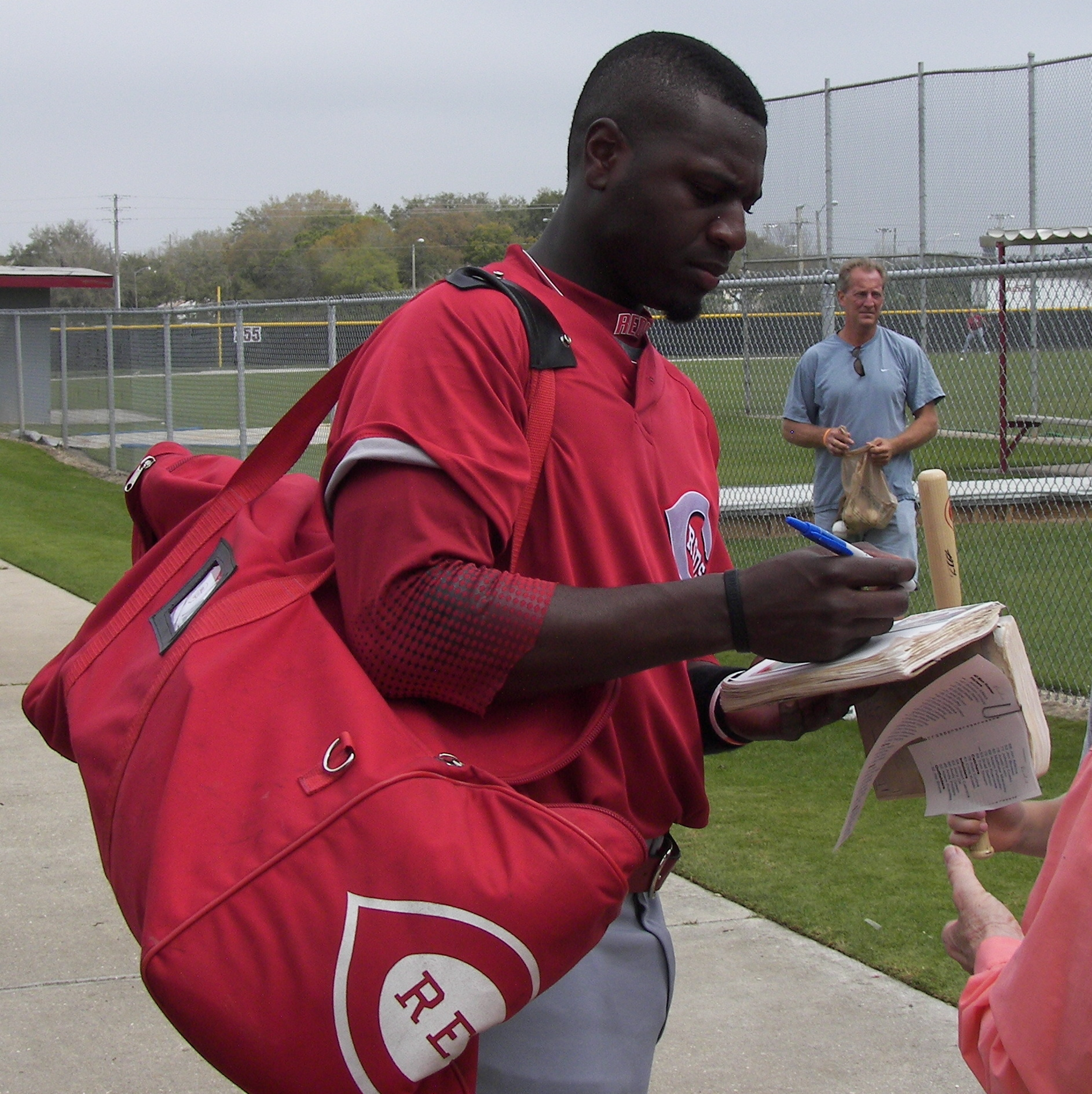
Phillips signing autographs during spring training in 2008.

On April 2, 2008, Phillips hit his first home run of the season against the Arizona Diamondbacks. At the All-Star Break, Phillips was batting .287 with 15 home runs, 58 RBI, 18 stolen bases, and 18 doubles. He ended the season batting .261/.312/.442 with 21 home runs and 23 stolen bases.

Phillips won his first gold glove in 2008, leading National League second basemen with a .990 fielding percentage having made just seven errors in 706 chances, in addition to a 78-game error-less streak. He also won a Fielding Bible Award as the top fielding second baseman in MLB.

==== 2009 ====
In 2009, Phillips hit .276/.329/.447, with 30 doubles, 20 home runs, 98 RBI and 25 stolen bases.

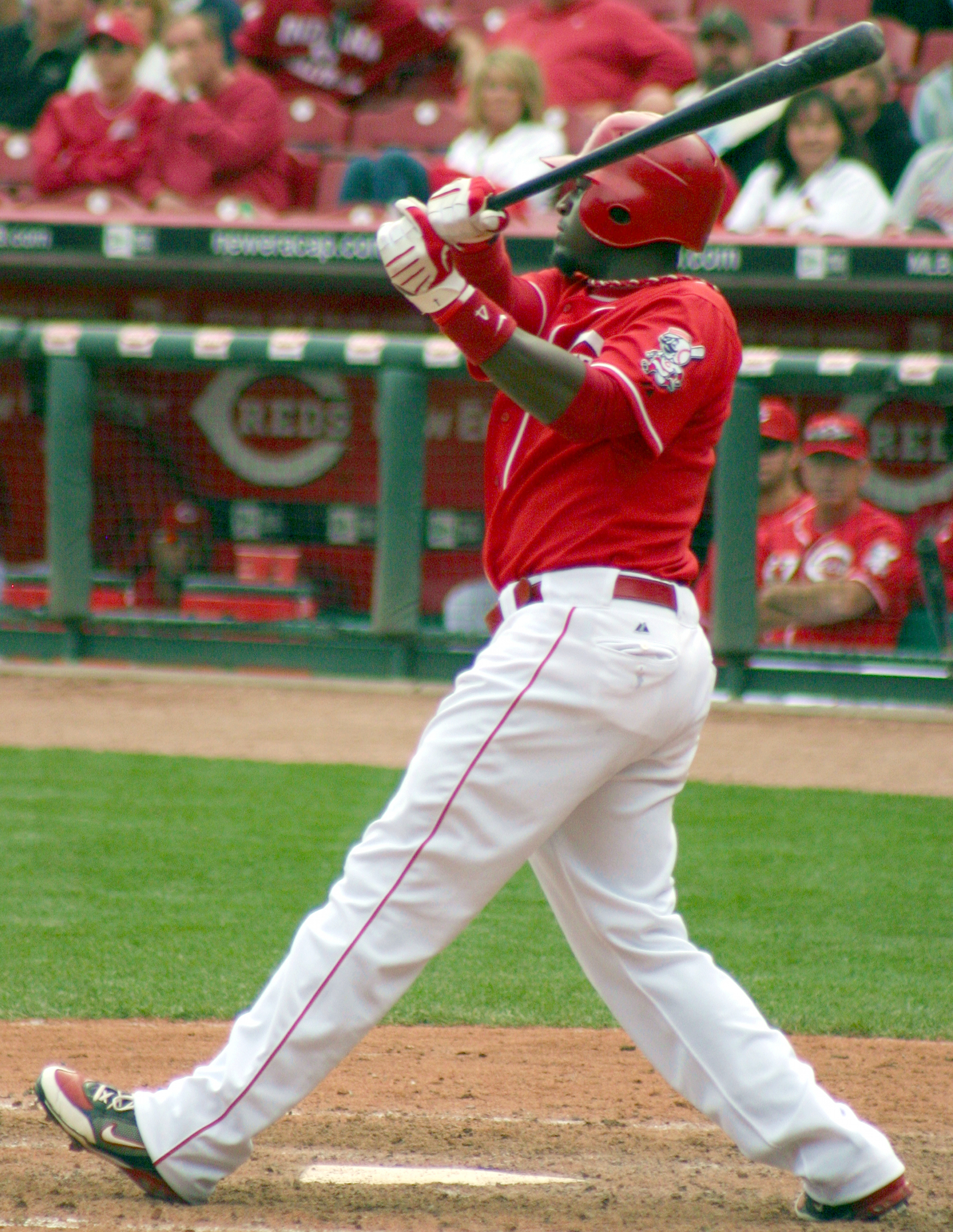
Phillips batting for the Reds in 2009 at Great American Ball Park

==== 2010 ====
In 2010, Phillips had his first All-Star season. He finished the season batting .275, with 18 homers, 59 RBI, and 16 stolen bases.

In early August, Phillips made national sports headlines with unflattering remarks about the St. Louis Cardinals, a team the Reds were in a hotly contested race with for lead in the National League Central division. Phillips was quoted by the Dayton Daily News as saying "I hate the Cardinals. All they do is bitch and moan about everything, all of them, they're little bitches, all of them. ... I hate the Cardinals." The next night, August 10, Phillips was involved in a large bench-clearing brawl between the Reds and Cardinals at home plate. Coming to bat in the bottom of the first inning, Phillips customarily tapped his bat against the shin pads of Cardinals catcher Yadier Molina and the umpire. Molina kicked Phillips' bat. The ensuing bench clearing melee included Johnny Cueto kicking Jason Larue in his face resulting in injuries that ended his career.

On November 10, 2010, it was announced that Phillips had won the second Gold Glove of his Major League career.

==== 2011 ====
On May 3, 2011, against the Houston Astros, Phillips threw out speedy Jason Bourgeois by picking up the ball barehanded as it rolled to him and throwing it to first baseman Joey Votto between his legs to record the out.

On July 1, Phillips hit two home runs against the Cleveland Indians, the second homer being his 1,000th career hit. After several great plays in the field earned him fame around the country and his average stayed around .300 the whole first half, Phillips made his second straight All-Star game. He was in first place in voting for most of the year until Milwaukee's Rickie Weeks passed him, getting the starting nod.

On November 1, 2011, it was announced that Phillips had won the third Gold Glove of his major league career. His fielding percentage for the season was .992 in 721 chances. The next day, it was announced that Phillips had won the first Silver Slugger of his Major League career. He hit an even .300 with 183 hits, 38 doubles, 2 triples, 18 homers, and 82 RBI. His on-base percentage was .353.

==== 2012 ====
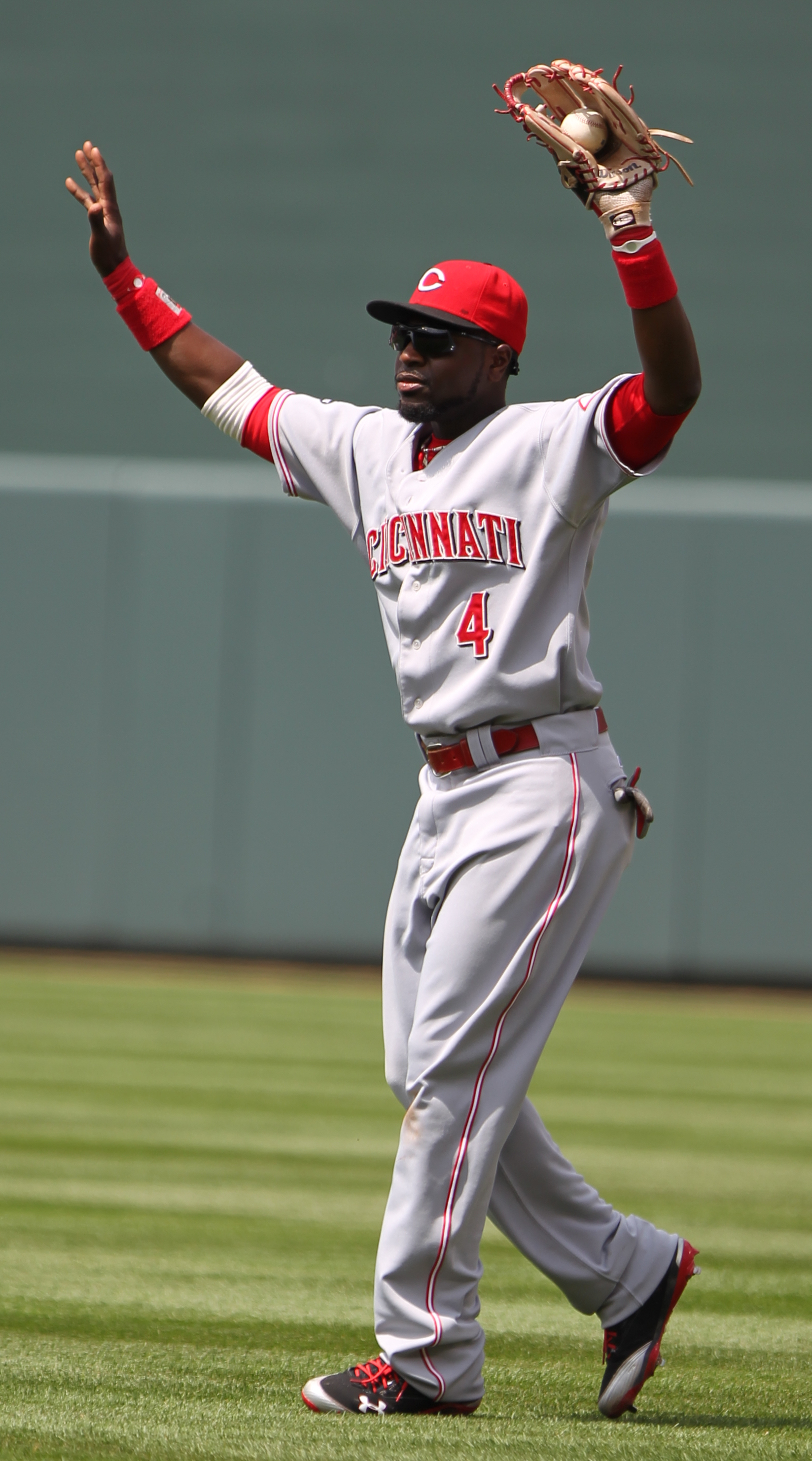
Phillips fielding with the Reds in 2011

On April 10, 2012, it was announced that Phillips and the Reds had agreed to a six-year, $72.5 million contract, through the 2017 season. Phillips was represented in contract negotiations by ACES Inc. When the All-Star game roster was announced on July 1, Phillips was not amongst those voted in by either fans or National League players and coaches. Reds manager Dusty Baker took exception at retired St. Louis Cardinals manager but the National League's All-Star Game manager Tony La Russa, claiming Phillips and fellow Reds teammate Johnny Cueto were left off the roster because they were at the heart of an on-field fight involving Baker's Reds and La Russa's Cardinals in 2010. Baker stated "it just kind of looks bad that Johnny and Brandon were at the center of the skirmish between us and the Cardinals. Some of the Cardinals that aren't there any more are making some of the selections." Phillips, who was hitting just under .290 with 10 home runs and 46 RBI at the time the selections were announced, declined to comment on the matter. USA Today's Mike Jones mentioned the large number of votes for San Francisco Giants players, including Pablo Sandoval (.300, 6 HR, 25 RBI) who was named the All-Star game's third baseman over New York Mets' David Wright (over .350, 9 HR, 50 RBI) was responsible for "taking away an infield spot".

In 2012, Brandon Phillips had a .281 batting average, 18 home runs, and 77 runs batted in. He did not win a Gold Glove for the first time since 2009. He batted .375 in the National League Division Series versus the San Francisco Giants, despite their loss of the series.

==== 2013 ====
Phillips was the Reds' Opening Day number two hitter; however, he became the cleanup hitter after left fielder Ryan Ludwick tore his shoulder on opening day. César Izturis was his backup. He had a 12-game hitting streak from May 12 to 25. Phillips hit .266 with 12 home runs and 74 RBI, good enough to earn him the starting second baseman spot on the National League team in the All-Star Game.

On August 28, Phillips was moved to the second spot in the lineup, and Jay Bruce became the cleanup hitter. While hitting second in 2013, he hit .240 with two home runs and six RBI in 23 games. In 127 games while hitting fourth, he hit .265/.310/.396 with 16 home runs and 96 RBI. In 151 games in 2013, he hit .261 with 18 home runs and 103 RBI. He won a Gold Glove, compiling a .987 fielding percentage, with nine errors.

==== 2014 ====
Phillips was placed on the disabled list July 11, 2014, after suffering a torn thumb ligament while diving for a ground ball in a game against the Chicago Cubs. At the time, he was hitting .272 with seven home runs and 40 RBI, and had only committed one error in 86 games at second base. He was reinstated from the DL on August 18. Phillips finished the season hitting .266 with eight home runs and 56 RBI.

On October 23, 2014, Phillips was nominated for his potential fifth Gold Glove for second base.

==== 2015 ====
The 86th All-Star Game was played at Great American Ball Park, and Cardinals catcher Yadier Molina was selected to play. In the Reds' clubhouse for the All-Star Game, he was assigned Phillips' locker. Since the brawl between the Cardinals and Reds in 2010, the two mended their schism, and Molina has a photograph of their families together. When informed of whose locker he was using, he replied, "This is Phillips' locker? How about that? I'll have to write something to him." However, during pregame roster introductions, Reds fans booed all six Cardinals players in jest who were selected, including Molina, and even former Cardinal Albert Pujols, who was then with the Los Angeles Angels of Anaheim.

Phillips hit two home runs and stole two bases against the Pittsburgh Pirates on July 30, becoming only the 15th player—and second Red—to have a multi-homer, multi-steal game since 1901. He became the first player in MLB history to record two three-run home runs, seven RBIs, and two stolen bases in one game. Phillips finished the season hitting .294 (16th in the National League) with 173 hits (eighth in the NL), 12 home runs, 70 RBI, and 23 stolen bases (tenth in the NL). On October 29, 2015, he was named a finalist for the Gold Glove for second base.

==== 2016 ====
In 2016, Phillips appeared in 141 games, batting .291 with 11 home runs and 64 RBIs. He also stole 14 bases while being caught eight times.

=== Atlanta Braves ===
On February 12, 2017, Phillips waived his no-trade clause and was traded to the Atlanta Braves in exchange for minor league pitchers Andrew McKirahan and Carlos Portuondo. The Reds also sent $13 million in the deal, leaving the Braves to pay $1 million of Phillips' remaining salary. He made a late-season position switch to third base to facilitate the promotion of Ozzie Albies to the major leagues. On August 30, Phillips hit a bloop single to drive in Ender Inciarte for his 2,000th career hit. In 120 games for the Braves, Phillips batted .291 with 11 home runs and 52 RBIs.

=== Los Angeles Angels ===
On August 31, 2017, Phillips was traded to the Los Angeles Angels for cash considerations and Tony Sanchez. In 24 games played with the Angels, Phillips had a slash line of .255/.269/.382 in 102 at bats.

=== Boston Red Sox ===
On June 27, 2018, Phillips signed a minor league contract with the Boston Red Sox, and was assigned to the Triple-A Pawtucket Red Sox. Phillips appeared in 38 games with Pawtucket and six games with the Class A Short Season Lowell Spinners, batting a combined .304 with five home runs and 26 RBIs.

Phillips was added to Boston's active roster on September 4. He made his Red Sox debut the following day, hitting a two-run home run in the ninth inning to carry the Red Sox to a 9–8 victory over the Atlanta Braves, completing a comeback from Atlanta's 7–1 and 8–7 leads late in the game. Phillips was the first player in Red Sox history to wear uniform number 0. Overall with the 2018 Red Sox, Phillips appeared in nine games, batting 3-for-23 (.130) with one home run and two RBIs. The Red Sox finished the year 108–54, clinching the AL East pennant. The Red Sox went on to win the World Series over the Los Angeles Dodgers, although Phillips did not appear in any of their post-season games.

Phillips elected free agency on October 29.

=== Vallejo Admirals ===
On June 25, 2019, Phillips signed with the Vallejo Admirals of the independent Pacific Association. The team was managed by his younger brother P.J. Phillips. Phillips played four games for the Admirals before being granted his release.

=== Diablos Rojos del México ===
On July 15, 2019, Phillips signed with the Diablos Rojos del México of the Mexican League. During the season, he played in 36 games. Phillips batted .267/.327/.420 with 35 hits in 131 at bats. He had three home runs, 11 doubles and 15 RBIs. Phillips elected free agency on October 5, 2019.

=== Baseball Brilliance ===
In July 2020, Phillips played in eight games for the Baseball Brilliance of the Yinzer Baseball Confederacy. Phillips had five hits in 35 plate appearances for the Brilliance, with a .152/.200/.333 batting line. One of those five hits included a July 11 home run against the Steel City Slammin' Sammies at Washington Wild Things Park.

=== Lexington Legends ===
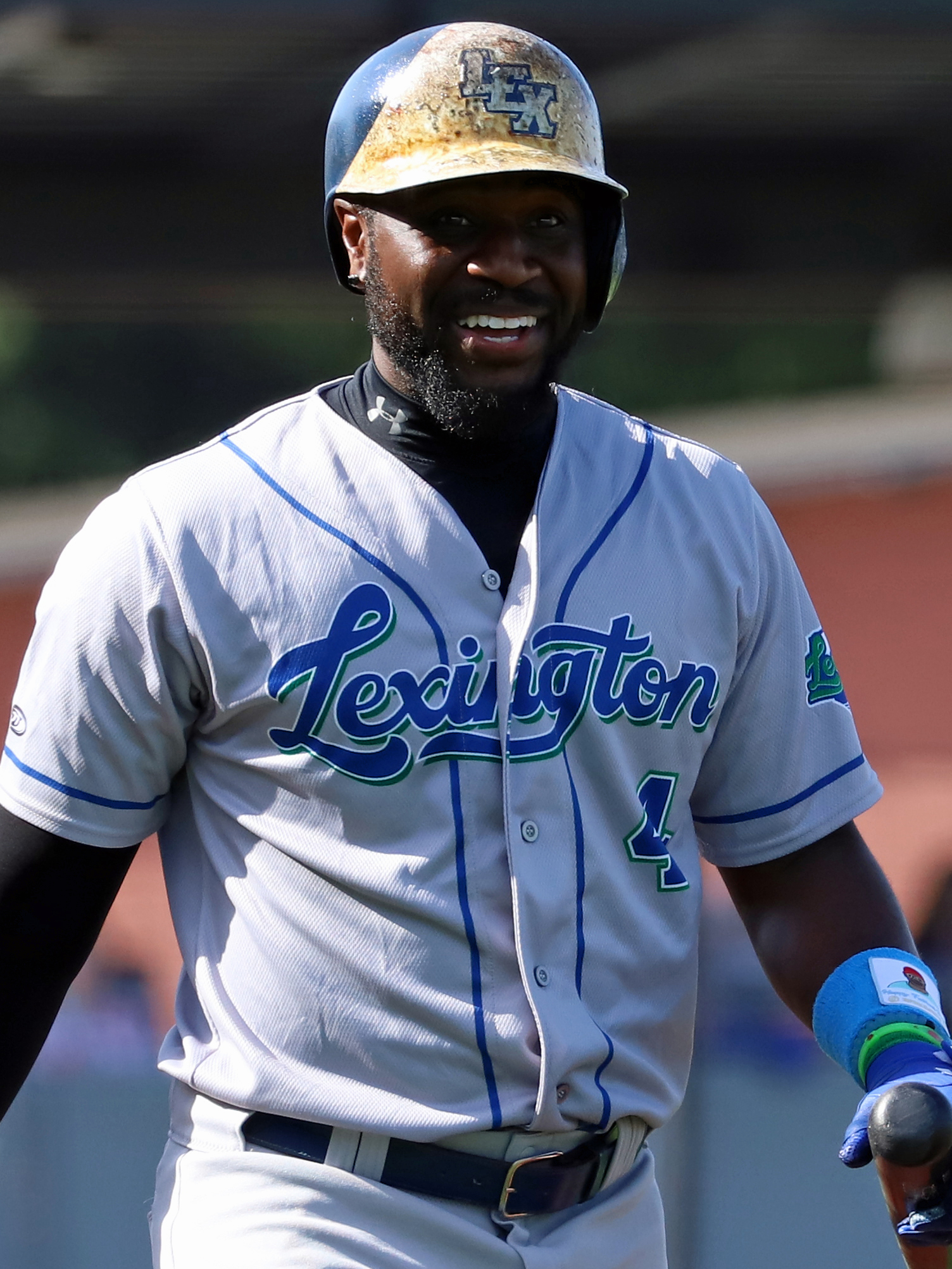
Brandon Phillips with the Lexington Legends - September 4, 2021

On August 19, 2020, Phillips joined the Lexington Legends in their Battle of the Bourbon Trail series. On August 22, Phillips hit a walk-off homer for the Legends, his third homer in three games for the team.

In 2021, the Legends moved to the Atlantic League of Professional Baseball and Phillips became a co-owner of the club in the offseason. On May 31, 2021, the Legends announced he was officially signed as a player, thus becoming the first Atlantic League player to appear on a roster for a team they co-own. He appeared in 54 games, posting a .276/.335/.507 line with 14 home runs and 52 RBIs, as the Legends went on to win the ALPB Championship. In 2022, Phillips played in 40 games, slashing .250/.320/.391 with four home runs and 18 RBIs. Following the season, the club was sold to a new ownership group and Phillips left the franchise.

=== Retirement ===
Phillips signed a one-day ceremonial contract with the Reds on April 25, 2026 in order to retire as a member of the team. He was also inducted into the Cincinnati Reds Hall of Fame on the same day.

== Personal life ==
Phillips has a daughter with his wife, fitness model and professional wrestler Jade Cargill.

In March 2023, Phillips and Cargill were announced as owners of the Texas Smoke, the fourth franchise of Women's Professional Fastpitch (WPF), based in Austin, Texas.

The Texas Smoke won the 2023 WPF regular season with a record of 22–14 and then swept the USSSA Pride in the inaugural Women's Professional Fastpitch championship series with an impressive 14–2 win.

== See also ==
- List of Major League Baseball career runs scored leaders
- List of Major League Baseball career hits leaders
- List of Gold Glove Award winners at second base
- List of Silver Slugger Award winners at second base
