= Dee Strange-Gordon =

American baseball player (born 1988)

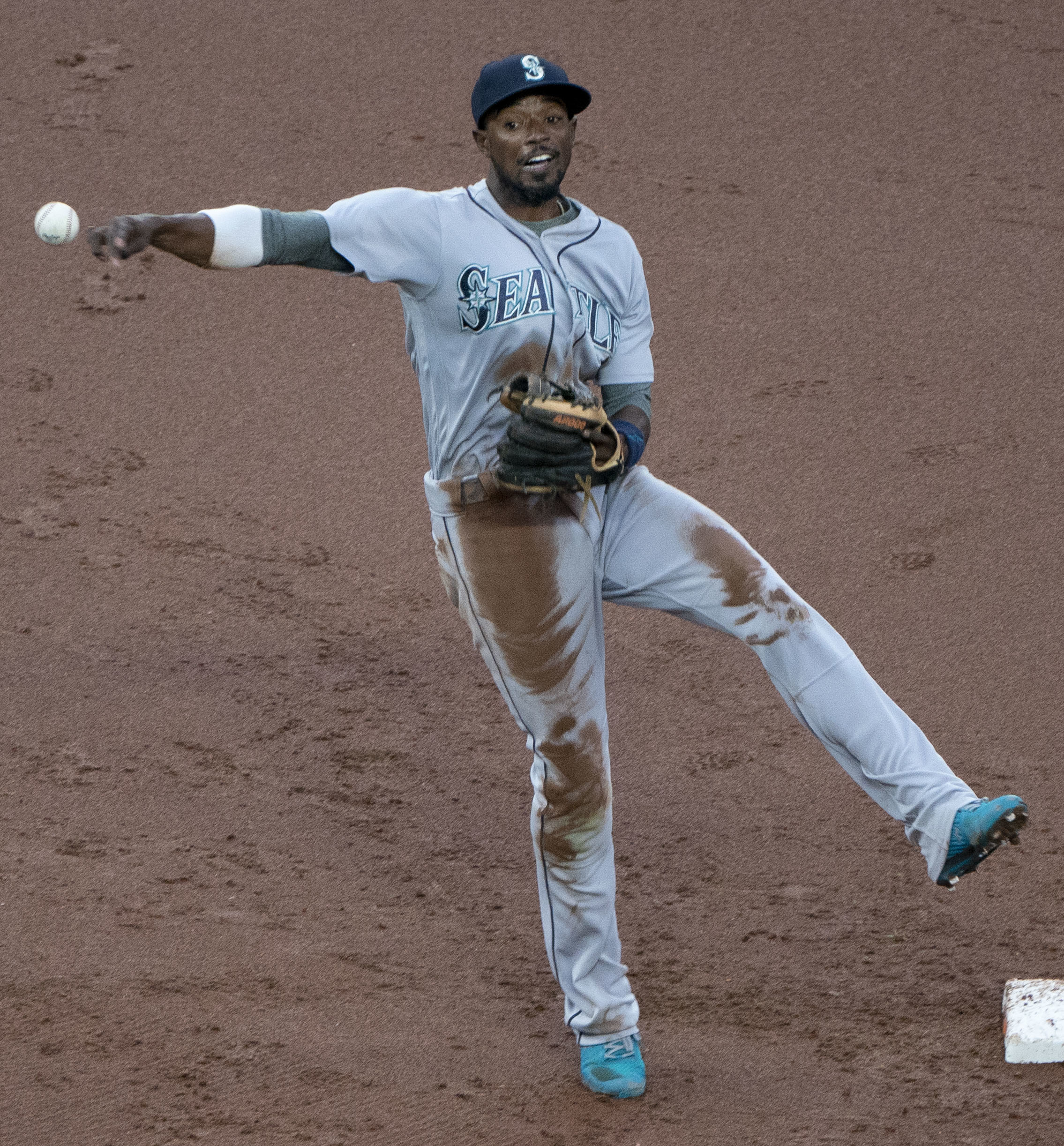
- Strange-Gordon with the Seattle Mariners in 2018
- Second baseman / Shortstop
- Born: April 22, 1988 (age 38); Windermere, Florida, U.S.
- Batted: Left Threw: Right

MLB debut
- June 6, 2011, for the Los Angeles Dodgers

Last MLB appearance
- June 7, 2022, for the Washington Nationals

MLB statistics
- Batting average: .286
- Home runs: 18
- Runs batted in: 236
- Stolen bases: 336
- Stats at Baseball Reference

Teams
- Los Angeles Dodgers (2011–2014); Miami Marlins (2015–2017); Seattle Mariners (2018–2020); Washington Nationals (2022)

Career highlights and awards
- 2× All-Star (2014, 2015); Gold Glove Award (2015); Silver Slugger Award (2015); NL batting champion (2015); 3× MLB stolen base leader (2014, 2015, 2017)

Devaris "Dee" Strange-Gordon (born April 22, 1988), formerly known as Dee Gordon, is an American former professional baseball second baseman, shortstop, and center fielder. He played Major League Baseball (MLB) for the Los Angeles Dodgers, Miami Marlins, Seattle Mariners, and Washington Nationals.

Strange-Gordon debuted in MLB with the Dodgers in 2011. He was primarily a shortstop and second baseman, and with the Marlins, he was primarily a second baseman. He began his tenure with the Mariners by playing center field in 2018, and started playing left field in 2020. In 2015, in his first season with the Marlins, Strange-Gordon hit .333 with 205 hits and stole 58 bases. He led the NL in all three categories and became the first player to lead the National League in both batting average and stolen bases since Jackie Robinson in 1949. Through the 2010s, Strange-Gordon stole 330 bases, the most of any MLB player of the decade.

== Early life ==
Strange-Gordon was born in Windermere, Florida, the son of former MLB pitcher Tom Gordon and Devona Denise Strange. His parents were high school sweethearts but did not marry; Tom had relationships with three other women as well and had a total of five children, all in Florida. Strange-Gordon is his second-oldest. When Strange-Gordon was seven years old, his mother Devona was shot to death by a subsequent boyfriend who claimed that she was shot as they played with a loaded gun. The boyfriend pleaded no contest to manslaughter and was sentenced to five years in prison. Tom Gordon sued for custody of Strange-Gordon and raised him with the help of his own mother, Strange-Gordon's grandmother.

== Baseball career ==
=== Amateur career ===
Though his father was a baseball player, Strange-Gordon initially focused on basketball and did not play baseball until he was in high school. He received a scholarship offer to play college basketball for the Louisville Cardinals.

Gordon played baseball at Avon Park High School (like his father) in Avon Park, Florida. He then played at Seminole Community College, and NAIA school Southeastern University, all in central Florida.

=== Minor leagues ===
The Los Angeles Dodgers drafted Strange-Gordon in the fourth round of the 2008 Major League Baseball draft.

In 2008, with the Ogden Raptors of the Pioneer League, he hit .331 in 60 games. With the Great Lakes Loons in 2009, Gordon hit .301 and stole 73 bases. He appeared in the Midwest League All-Star Game, was named the league's Most Valuable Player, selected to its mid-season and post-season All-Star teams, and chosen for the Prospect of the Year Award. The Dodgers also selected him as their "Minor League Player of the Year".

In 2010, he was with the Chattanooga Lookouts in the Double-A Southern League and was selected to represent the Lookouts in the All-Star game but was unable to play because he was also selected to the All-Star Futures Game. He hit .277 in 133 games in 2010, while stealing 53 bases and committing 37 errors. He played for Gigantes de Carolina in the Puerto Rico Baseball League after the season. He was assigned to the Triple-A Albuquerque Isotopes to start 2011. At that time, Gordon was the Dodgers' best prospect according to Baseball America.

=== Los Angeles Dodgers ===
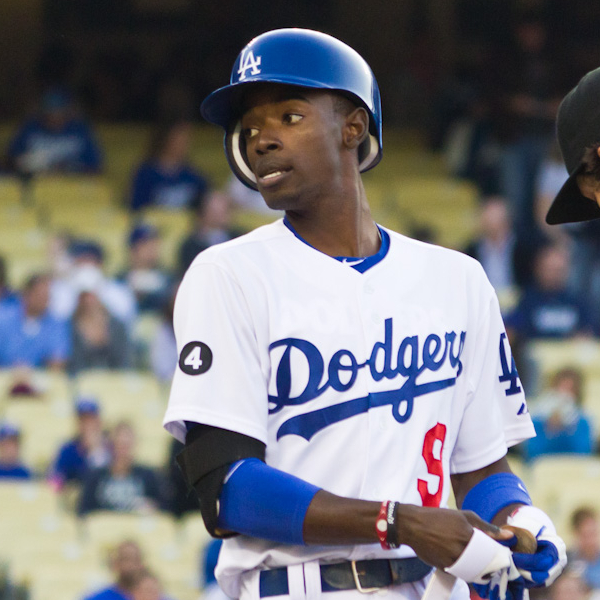
Gordon with the Los Angeles Dodgers in 2011

After an injury to shortstop Rafael Furcal, the Dodgers purchased Gordon's contract on June 6, 2011, and he made his major league debut in the top of the ninth as a pinch runner against the Philadelphia Phillies that night and scored a run. His father was in attendance. The next day, in his first start, he had hits in his first three major league at bats and stole one base. In a game against the Los Angeles Angels of Anaheim on July 1, Gordon stole second, third, and, home in the same inning. He became the first Dodger player since Harvey Hendrick in 1928 and the first Major Leaguer since Jayson Werth on May 12, 2009 to accomplish that feat. Gordon appeared in 56 games for the Dodgers, hitting .304 with 24 stolen bases. He also stole 30 bases for the Isotopes, giving him a total of 54 between the majors and the minors in 2011. In just 56 games for the Dodgers, Gordon's 24 stolen bases tied for the most by a rookie during the 2011 season. He was selected to the Topps All-Star Rookie team.

Gordon hit his first career home run on May 1, 2012, leading off the game against Jhoulys Chacín of the Colorado Rockies. On June 1, 2012, Gordon was part of a Dodgers lineup that featured the sons of five former Major Leaguers (along with Tony Gwynn Jr., Iván DeJesús Jr., Jerry Hairston Jr. and Scott Van Slyke). This was the first time in Major League history that this had occurred. It was also the first time a starting infield of four major league sons had ever occurred: first baseman Van Slyke, second baseman Hairston, third baseman DeJesús, and shortstop Gordon. Gordon was leading the league in stolen bases when he tore the UCL in his right thumb on a successful steal of third base on July 4 against the Cincinnati Reds. He did not rejoin the club until September 11, by which time the club had acquired Hanley Ramírez to play shortstop. With his starting spot gone, Gordon was relegated to a pinch running role the remainder of the season. Overall, in 2012, he played in 87 games and hit .228 with 32 steals. After the season, he played for the Tigres del Licey in the Dominican Winter League.

He began 2013 back in Triple-A with the Isotopes and was called up to the Dodgers on May 4 after an injury to Ramírez. He played in 19 games, during which he hit a poor .175, and was optioned back to Triple-A. He rejoined the Dodgers late in the season and was used primarily as a pinch runner. He stole 10 bases in 12 attempts for the Dodgers in 2013 while hitting .231 in 38 games. Later in the season, the Isotopes started playing Gordon at second base and he played center field in the Dominican Winter League in an attempt to improve his versatility.

Gordon beat out Alex Guerrero to become the Dodgers starting second baseman for the 2014 season. He hit .301 in the first half of the season, while leading the league in triples (9) and steals (42), and he was selected to the National League squad at the 2014 Major League Baseball All-Star Game. At the All-Star game at Target Field, when Gordon was in the on-deck circle, Derek Jeter told Fox TV commentators how amazing it was to see Dee there, also playing as an All-Star, having first met him at age 15 when his father Tom was then pitching for the Yankees. Gordon had entered the game as a pinch-runner in the fourth inning, scoring the game-tying run. Overall, he went 0–1, but made a strong fielding play at second base, sliding to his right to grab a ground ball to end the sixth inning.

Gordon finished the 2014 season with 64 stolen bases, the most in Major League Baseball. It was the first time a Dodgers player had led the Major League in stolen bases since Davey Lopes stole 77 bases in 1975. He hit .289 in over 600 at-bats and also led the majors with 12 triples. He was selected as a Sporting News National League all-star.

=== Miami Marlins ===
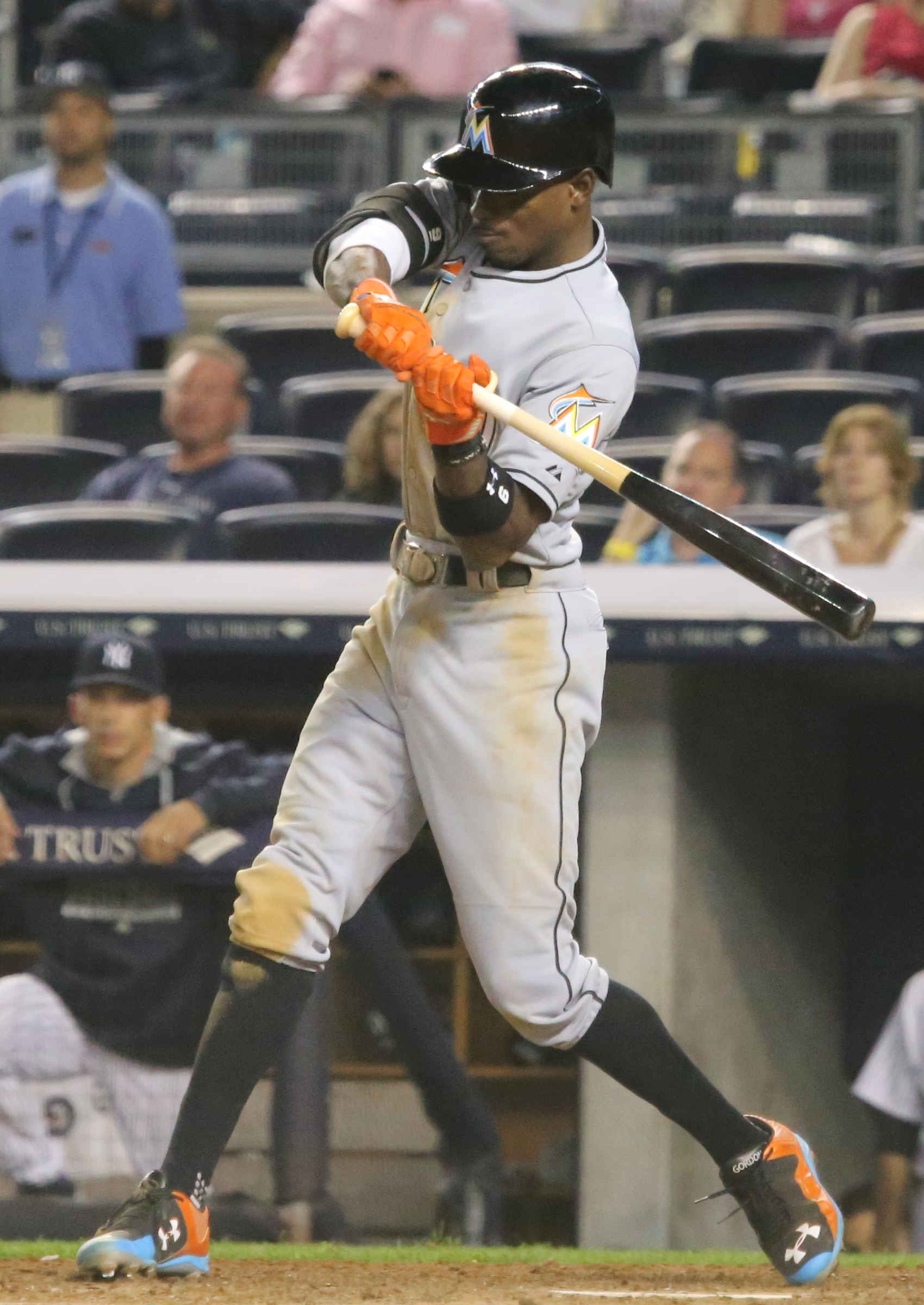
Gordon batting for the Miami Marlins in 2015

On December 10, 2014, Gordon was traded to the Miami Marlins, along with Dan Haren and Miguel Rojas, in exchange for Andrew Heaney, Chris Hatcher, Austin Barnes, and Enrique Hernández. Gordon recorded his 50th hit of the season in the Marlins' 28th game on May 7, 2015, tying Rogers Hornsby's 1924 Major League record for fewest team games required to reach 50 hits. After 28 games, Gordon led the major leagues with a .437 batting average. On May 22, Gordon stole four bases in a game against the Baltimore Orioles. In a June 30 home game against the San Francisco Giants, Gordon hit his first inside-the-park home run. The home run against pitcher Ryan Vogelsong scored three runs. It was also the first inside-the-park homer at Marlins Park. Gordon batted .333 for the season, winning the National League batting title and leading the majors in infield hits (36) and bunt hits (16) and winning his first Rawlings Gold Glove Award.

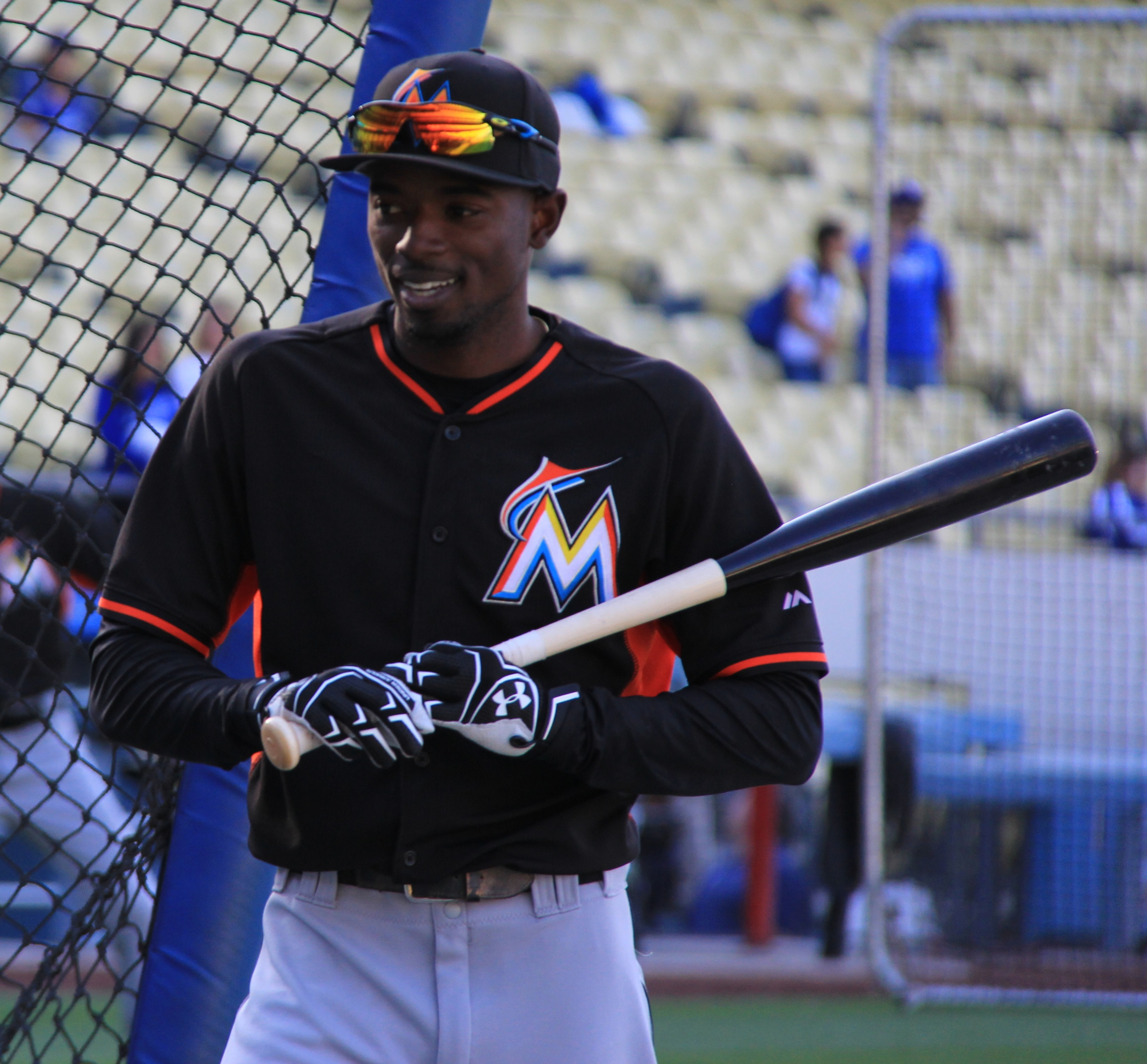
Gordon playing for the Miami Marlins in 2016

On January 18, 2016, Gordon signed a five-year contract extension with the Marlins worth $50 million. On April 29, Major League Baseball suspended Gordon for 80 games due to performance-enhancing drugs use. He tested positive for exogenous testosterone and clostebol.

On September 26, the day after teammate and friend José Fernández died in a boating accident, Gordon led off the game versus the Mets. A left handed hitter, he took the first pitch of his at bat as a right-handed batter, imitating Fernández's batting stance, with Fernández's batting helmet in honor of his late friend; pitcher Bartolo Colón, out of respect, threw the pitch for a ball. Gordon then switched to bat left handed as he does naturally and, following a second ball, Colón threw a fastball down the middle of the strike zone, which Gordon hit for his first home run of the year. He rounded the bases fighting off tears and hugged teammates upon his arrival back to the dugout. He said after the game that he had never hit a ball that far, even in batting practice, adding, "If y'all don't believe in God, y'all might as well start. For that to happen today, we had some help." Gordon's tribute home run to Fernández has been described as a "transcendent MLB moment."

In 2016 he batted .268/.305/.335 with one home run. For the season, he had the highest ground ball percentage (57.6%) and the lowest fly ball percentage (19.6%) of all major league hitters.

In 2017, he batted .308/.341/.375 with two home runs, and led the majors in bunt hits, with 18.

=== Seattle Mariners ===
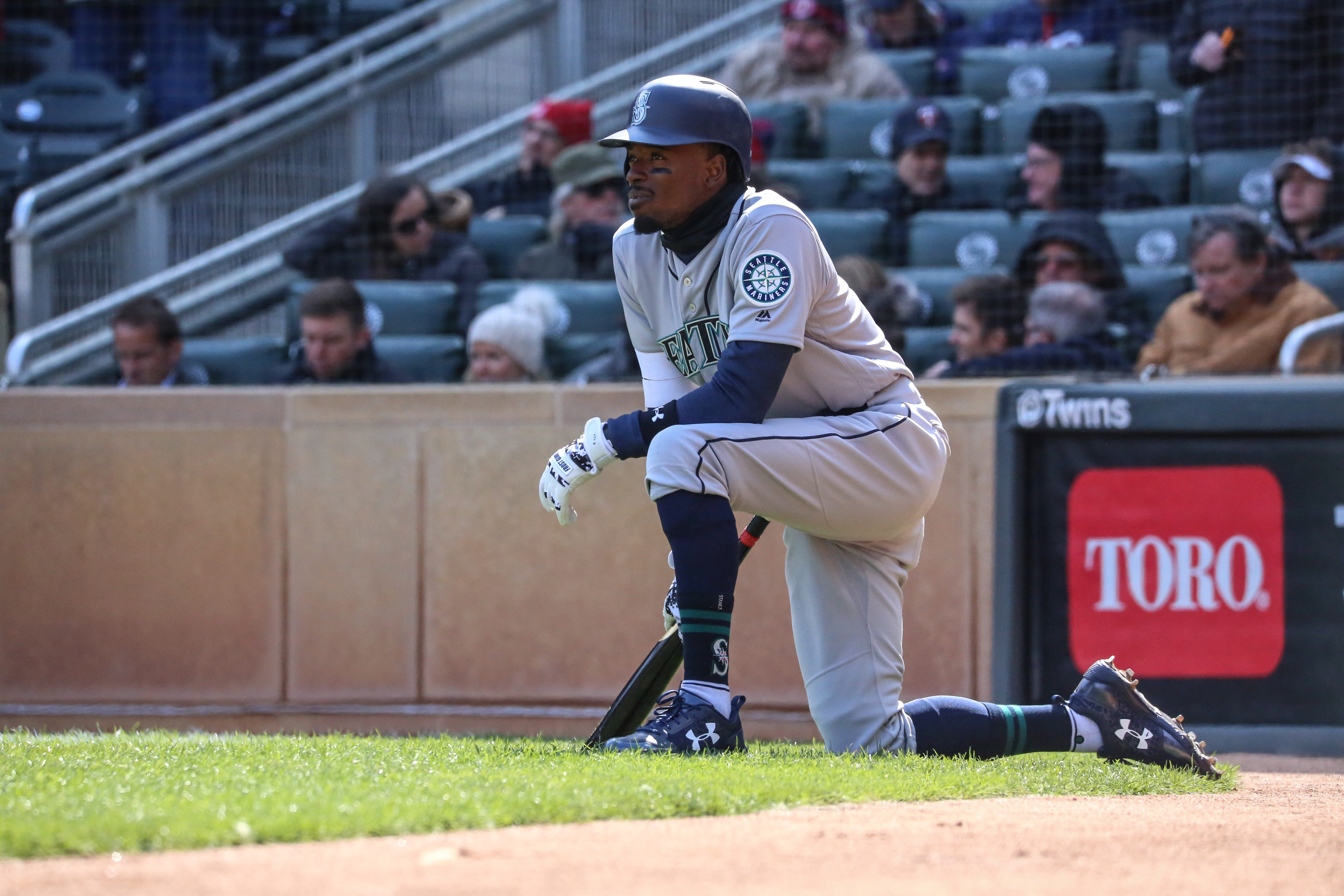
Gordon playing for the Seattle Mariners in 2018

On December 7, 2017, the Marlins traded Gordon and international slot money to the Seattle Mariners for Nick Neidert, Christopher Torres, and Robert Dugger. It was also reported that Gordon would be an outfielder for the Mariners. Gordon played outfield for the Mariners until Robinson Canó was suspended for 80 games, at which point Gordon returned to second base.

In September 2018, a day after Gordon nonchalantly dropped a fly ball in the outfield, he was criticized by and fought teammate Jean Segura in the team's locker room after asking media to leave the room. For the 2018 season, Gordon batted .268/.288/.349 with four home runs in 556 at-bats. Opposing fielders did not consider him a power threat: center fielders set up on average only 302 feet from home plate when he came to bat and left fielders 267 feet from home plate, closer than for any other major league hitter. While he stole 30 bases (fifth in the league), he led the American League with 12 times caught stealing. On defense, his 10 errors at second base were third among all AL second basemen, and his .963 fielding percentage in center field was the lowest among center fielders with at least 400 innings played. Gordon walked in 1.5% of his plate appearances, the lowest percentage in the major leagues, and had the lowest walk-to-strikeout ratio in the majors at 0.11.

In 2019, Gordon batted .275/.304/.359 and stole 22 bases in 117 games.

In 2020, he batted .200/.268/.213 and stole three bases in 33 games. As a utility player, he split time equally between second base and left field (13 games each), with three appearances at shortstop, and served as a pinch runner in seven games. He had the fastest average time from home plate to first base of all major league second basemen, at 4.18 seconds.

On October 27, 2020, it was reported that the Mariners would not pick up Strange-Gordon's $14 million contract option for the 2021 season, instead paying him a $1 million buyout. The following day, the Mariners officially declined his option, making him a free agent.

=== Milwaukee Brewers ===
On February 7, 2021, Strange-Gordon signed a minor league contract with the Cincinnati Reds organization. On March 26, the Reds released Strange-Gordon.

On April 8, 2021, Strange-Gordon signed a minor league contract with the Milwaukee Brewers organization. He hit .333 with 1 home run in 10 games for the Triple-A Nashville Sounds before being released by Milwaukee on May 22.

=== Chicago Cubs ===
On May 26, 2021, Strange-Gordon signed a minor league contract with the Chicago Cubs organization and was assigned to the Triple-A Iowa Cubs. In 27 games with Iowa, he batted .223/.270/.310 with 1 home run and 9 RBI. On July 6, Strange-Gordon opted out of his minor league deal and elected free agency.

=== Pittsburgh Pirates ===
On July 7, 2021, Strange-Gordon signed a minor league contract with the Pittsburgh Pirates organization. On August 1, Strange-Gordon opted out of his contract.

=== Washington Nationals ===
On December 11, 2021, Strange-Gordon signed a minor league contract with the Washington Nationals organization. On April 7, 2022, the Nationals selected Strange-Gordon's contract, adding him to their opening day roster as a result of his strong play during spring training. On April 12, Strange-Gordon made his first career MLB appearance as a pitcher in the 8th inning of a 16-4 loss to the Atlanta Braves. He allowed three runs in his one inning of work, giving up a home run, issuing three walks, and hitting one batter. The Nationals designated Strange-Gordon for assignment on June 14. He was released on June 19; at the time he was batting .305 with a .661 OPS. On July 16, the Nationals re-signed Strange–Gordon to a minor league contract. He was released on August 5.

According to Strange-Gordon’s father Tom, he has retired from professional baseball and now owns a farm in Florida. He last played in an exhibition game against the Savannah Bananas.

== Personal life ==
Dee's half-brother, Nick Gordon, was drafted by the Minnesota Twins in the first round (#5) of the 2014 draft.

Gordon is involved with many charities, such as Above .500 Inc. where he hosted meet and greets and participated in multiple charity games. Gordon created "Flash of Hope", a charity to help children whose parent died as a result of domestic abuse. Working with the Florida State Attorney's office, he invites one child a month to join him in the clubhouse and during batting practice. In 2017, Gordon was the Marlins nominee for the Roberto Clemente Award after his work to end poverty in the Dominican Republic. He was the Mariners' nominee for the award in 2020, with the team recognizing his work with organizations dealing with domestic violence, world hunger, and the COVID-19 pandemic. In 2020, Strange-Gordon won the Hutch Award.

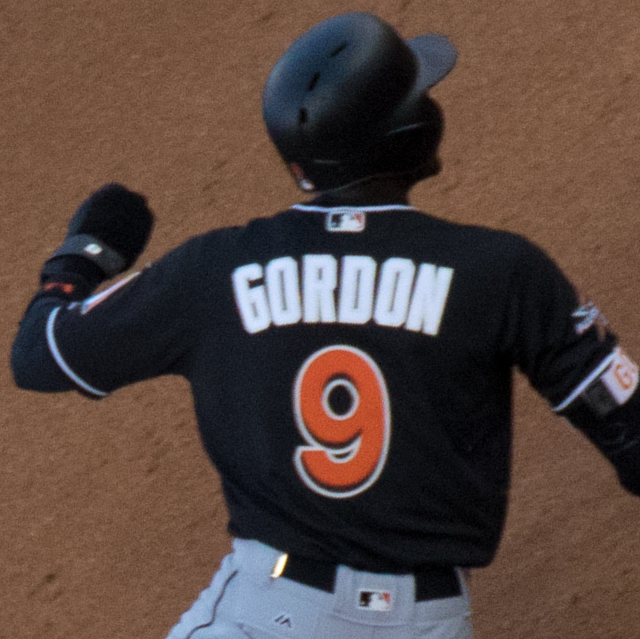
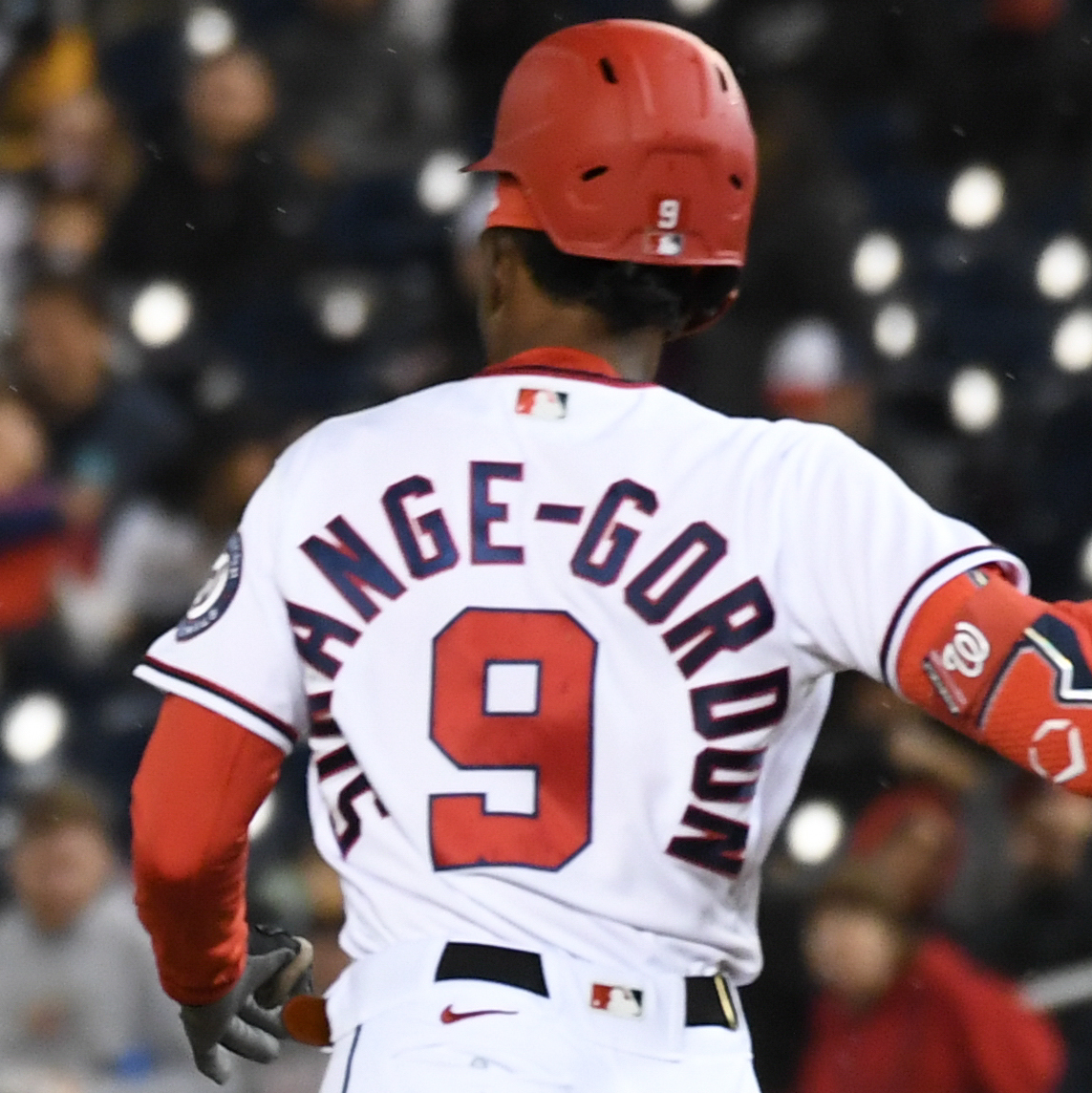
Strange-Gordon in 2017 with the Marlins with the "Gordon" surname, then in 2022 with the Nationals with a hyphenated last name.

Friends and family call Strange-Gordon "Varis." He was known professionally by his full name until 2008, when a Missoula Osprey public address announcer mispronounced his first and last names. He thereafter chose to be known professionally as Dee Gordon. In 2020, he said he would like to return to being known by his legal surname professionally, to honor his deceased mother.

== See also ==
- List of Major League Baseball batting champions
- List of Major League Baseball annual stolen base leaders
- List of Silver Slugger Award winners at second base
- List of Gold Glove Award winners at second base
- List of second-generation Major League Baseball players
- List of Major League Baseball players suspended for performance-enhancing drugs
