= Plácido Polanco =

Dominican-American baseball player (born 1975)

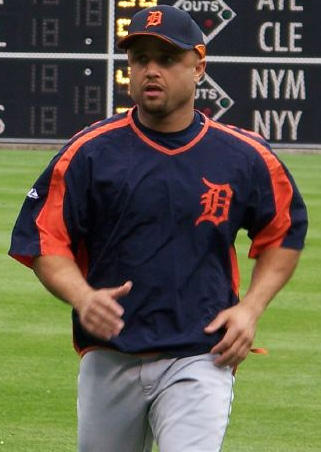
- Polanco with the Detroit Tigers in 2007
- Second baseman / Third baseman
- Born: October 10, 1975 (age 51); Santo Domingo, Dominican Republic
- Batted: Right Threw: Right

MLB debut
- July 3, 1998, for the St. Louis Cardinals

Last MLB appearance
- September 28, 2013, for the Miami Marlins

MLB statistics
- Batting average: .297
- Hits: 2,142
- Home runs: 104
- Runs batted in: 723
- Stats at Baseball Reference

Teams
- St. Louis Cardinals (1998–2002); Philadelphia Phillies (2002–2005); Detroit Tigers (2005–2009); Philadelphia Phillies (2010–2012); Miami Marlins (2013)

Career highlights and awards
- 2× All-Star (2007, 2011); ALCS MVP (2006); 3× Gold Glove Award (2007, 2009, 2011); Silver Slugger Award (2007)

Plácido Enrique Polanco (/ˈplɑːsɪdoʊ ɛnˈriːkeɪ poʊˈlɑːŋkoʊ/; born October 10, 1975) is a Dominican-American former professional baseball player. He played in Major League Baseball (MLB) for the St. Louis Cardinals, Philadelphia Phillies, Detroit Tigers and Miami Marlins. He was a second baseman, third baseman, and shortstop. He was twice voted to start in Major League Baseball All-Star Games: in 2007, and again in 2011. Polanco retired with the highest all-time career fielding percentage for second basemen at 99.27% and the highest all-time career fielding percentage for third basemen at 98.34% which still appear to be records.

On July 9, 2008, Polanco received his U.S. citizenship along with 99 other people in a ceremony at Comerica Park that preceded the Tigers–Indians game. He wore his Tigers uniform for the ceremony.

== Playing career ==
=== St. Louis Cardinals ===
Polanco was drafted on June 2, 1994, by the St. Louis Cardinals in the 19th round of the 1994 MLB draft. In 1996, he led the Florida State League with 157 hits and 137 games played while playing with Single-A St. Petersburg. Polanco was promoted to the major leagues in 1998. His first major league hit was a single off Cincinnati Reds starting pitcher Brett Tomko on July 5, 1998. Earning the starting third base job in 2001, his low strikeout/walk ratio and extra base hits numbers established Polanco as a contact hitter.

=== Philadelphia Phillies ===
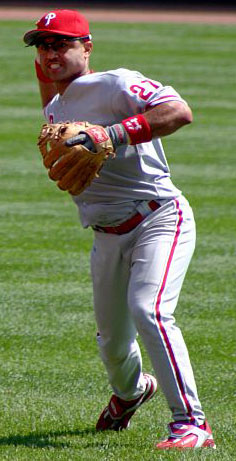
Polanco in 2009

On July 29, 2002, Polanco, Mike Timlin, and Bud Smith were acquired by the Phillies for Scott Rolen, Doug Nickle, and cash. Polanco was shifted to second base as David Bell was signed from free agency to play third base. He began to develop power while playing for the Phillies as he hit 14 and 17 home runs in the following two years, compared with just nine in 2002.

=== Detroit Tigers ===
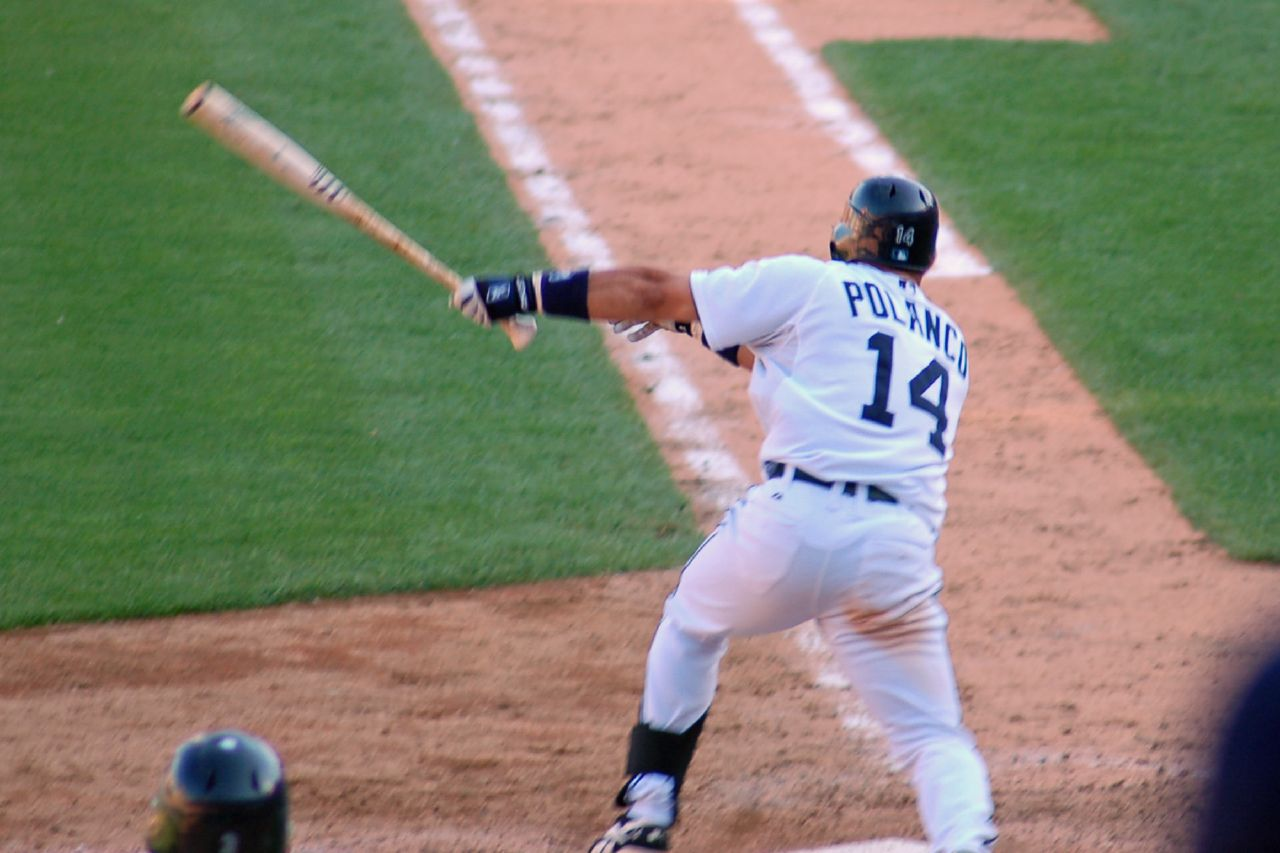
Polanco with the Tigers in 2007

The Phillies traded him to the Detroit Tigers in a June 2005 in a trade for veteran right-hander Ugueth Urbina and infielder Ramón Martínez, allowing the Phillies to play Chase Utley every day at second base. Polanco finished the 2005 season batting .338 with the Tigers, and also having a career year with regards to OPS, finishing the season at .847. In addition, he led the majors in lowest strikeout percentage (5.0%) for the season.

Polanco was a key player in the 2006 American League Division Series and 2006 American League Championship Series (ALCS) for the Tigers, being named Most Valuable Player of the ALCS. However, he did not record a single hit in the 2006 World Series, in which the Tigers lost to the Cardinals in five games.

In 2007, Polanco set a new major-league record for second basemen by playing in his 144th consecutive errorless game on August 13, in a 7–2 loss to the Oakland Athletics. Curt Flood currently holds the record for consecutive errorless games with 226, but he played center field. Polanco appeared to have his streak snapped at 147 games when he was charged with an error in the first inning of the August 24 game vs. the New York Yankees. However, the next day, after conferring with the umpiring crew, the official scorer determined the error was instead charged to first baseman Marcus Thames. This extended the streak to 149 games. Polanco also broke the record for consecutive chances without an error by a second baseman on July 31. He passed Luis Castillo's mark of 647. Polanco finished the 2007 season without making an error, thereby becoming the first everyday second baseman in MLB history to play an entire season without committing an error. This, in addition to contributing to 101 double plays, earned Polanco his first Gold Glove Award.

In addition to his fielding feats, Polanco batted a career-high .341 in 2007, and reached a career high in hits with 200. He also had the lowest strikeout percentage in the major leagues (5.1%). For his efforts, he was given the Silver Slugger Award at second base. He was voted by the fans to start in the 2007 Major League Baseball All-Star Game, his first one. At the end of the season, he was voted by the fans as the 2007 MLB "This Year in Baseball Awards" Defensive Player of the Year.

Polanco won another Gold Glove Award in 2009.

=== Return to the Phillies ===
After declaring free agency, Polanco signed a three-year contract for $18 million to return to the Phillies, with a mutual option for a fourth year. He was signed with the Phillies to replace Pedro Feliz at third base.

In 2011, Polanco was elected by fan balloting to be the starting third baseman in the All-Star game. He was unable to play in the All-Star game due to an injury, and Scott Rolen replaced him in the starting lineup. At the conclusion of the 2011 season, Polanco received his third Gold Glove, making him only the second baseball player in history to receive the award at more than one position. Darin Erstad had previously won Gold Gloves in the outfield and at first base.

On May 14, 2012, Polanco reached the 2,000 hit mark with an eighth-inning home run off David Carpenter of the Houston Astros.

On October 29, the Phillies elected to decline their half of a $5.5M mutual option, instead electing to pay Polanco a $1M buyout.

=== Miami Marlins ===
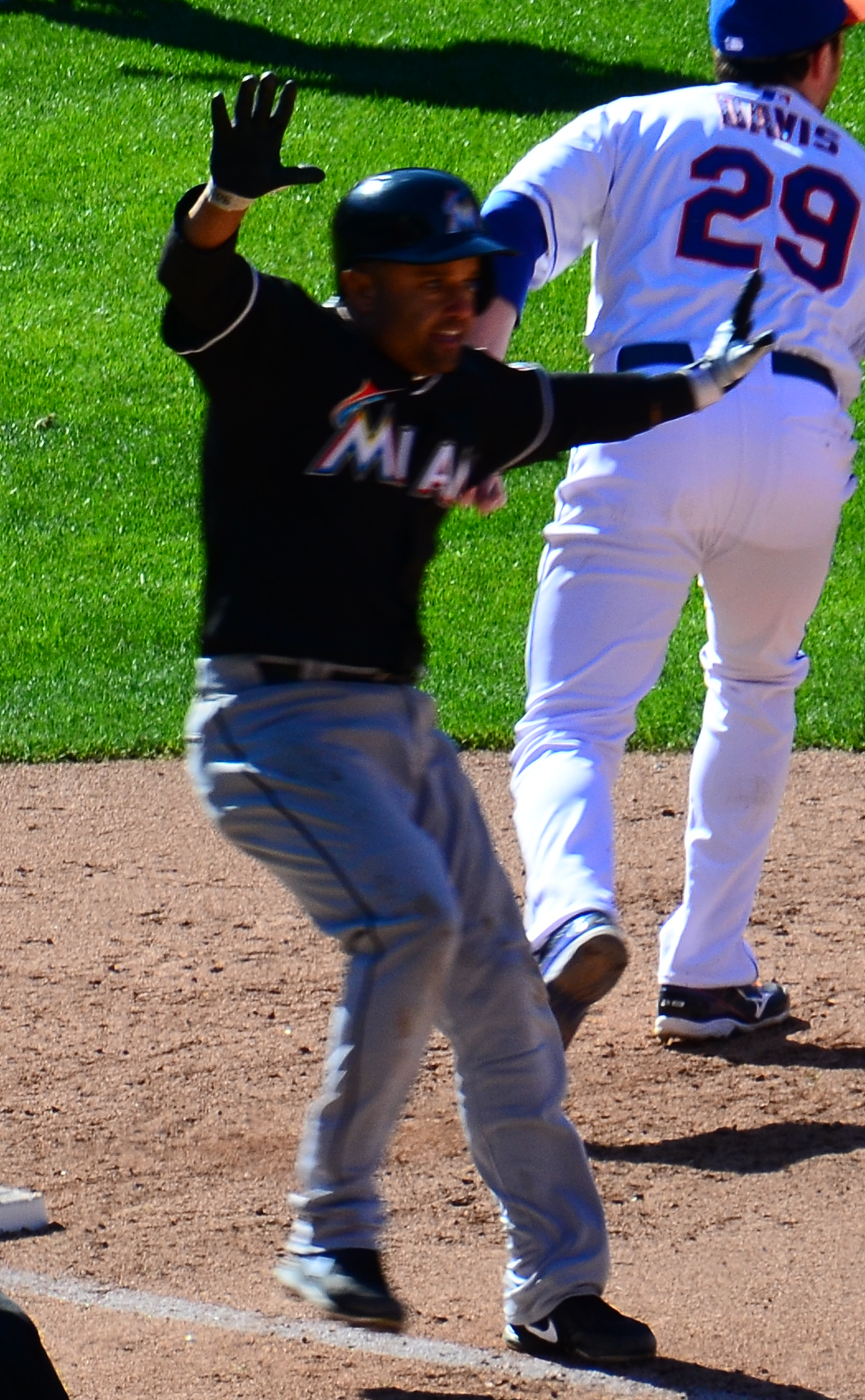
Polanco playing for the Miami Marlins in 2013

On December 20, 2012, the Miami Marlins and Polanco agreed to a one-year contract worth $2.75 million, making him the second-highest paid player on the team. The Marlins did not re-sign Polanco after the 2013 season and he was unable to find a contract in free agency for the 2014 season. In March 2015, he claimed to be "90 percent" retired but remained open to the possibility of returning to playing or launching a coaching career under the right circumstances.

=== Retirement ===
On August 14, 2016, Polanco officially retired with the Phillies.

Polanco was eligible to be elected into the Hall of Fame in 2019, but received only two votes, earning less than 5% of the vote and becoming ineligible for the 2020 ballot.

Polanco joined the Los Angeles Dodgers front office as a special assistant in player development in 2019.

=== Career statistics ===
In 1,927 games over 16 seasons, Polanco posted a .297 batting average (2142-for-7214) with 1009 runs, 348 doubles, 32 triples, 104 home runs, 723 RBI, 81 stolen bases, 429 walks, .343 on-base percentage, and .397 slugging percentage. Defensively, he finished his career with an overall .990 fielding percentage playing at second base, third base, and shortstop. In postseason play, in 38 games, he batted .248 (32-for-129) with 11 runs, 4 doubles, 13 RBI, 3 stolen bases, and 11 walks.

== Coaching career ==
Polanco with the Leones del Escogido in 2024

Prior to the 2024–25 LIDOM season, Polanco was named bench coach of the Leones del Escogido under new manager Albert Pujols. Polanco was also named the bench coach of the Dominican Republic national baseball team under Pujols at the 2026 World Baseball Classic.

== Personal life ==
Polanco and wife Lily have a daughter, Aide Rose, and a son, Ishmael. He is a close friend of former teammate Albert Pujols, who is godfather to Polanco's son.

In July 2008, while with the Tigers, Polanco became a naturalized American citizen, taking the oath of citizenship at Comerica Park.

== See also ==
- List of Major League Baseball career hits leaders
- List of Major League Baseball career runs scored leaders
- List of Gold Glove Award winners at second base
- List of Gold Glove Award winners at third base
- List of Silver Slugger Award winners at second base
