= List of Gold Glove Award winners at second base =

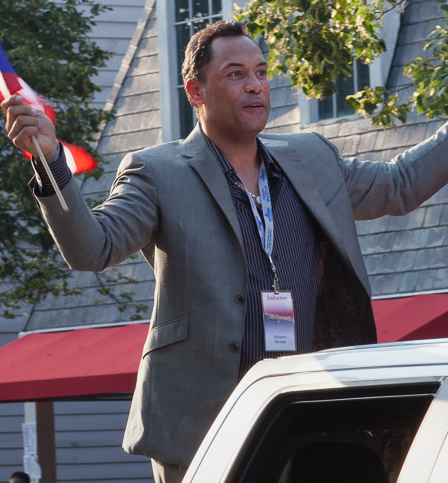
Roberto Alomar leads all second basemen with 10 Gold Glove Award wins.

The Gold Glove Award is the award given annually to the Major League Baseball players judged to have exhibited superior individual fielding performances at each fielding position in both the National League (NL) and the American League (AL), as voted by the managers and coaches in each league. Managers are not permitted to vote for their own players. Eighteen Gold Gloves are awarded each year (with the exception of 1957, 1985, 2007 and 2018), one at each of the nine positions in each league. In 1957, the baseball glove manufacturer Rawlings created the Gold Glove Award to commemorate the best fielding performance at each position. The award was created from a glove made from gold lamé-tanned leather and affixed to a walnut base. Initially, only one Gold Glove per position was awarded to the top fielder at each position in the entire league; however, separate awards were given for the National and American Leagues beginning in 1958.

Roberto Alomar leads second basemen in wins; he won 10 Gold Gloves in 11 years with three different American League teams. Ryne Sandberg has the second-highest total overall; his nine awards, all won with the Chicago Cubs, are the most by a National League player. Bill Mazeroski and Frank White are tied for the third-highest total, with eight wins. Mazeroski's were won with the Pittsburgh Pirates, and White won his with the Kansas City Royals. Joe Morgan and Bobby Richardson each won five Gold Glove Awards, and four-time winners include Craig Biggio (who won after converting to second base from catcher), Bret Boone, Bobby Grich, Orlando Hudson, Dustin Pedroia, and Brandon Phillips. Hall of Famers who won Gold Gloves at second base include Alomar, Sandberg, Mazeroski, Morgan, Biggio and Nellie Fox.

Only one winning second baseman has had an errorless season; Plácido Polanco set a record among winners by becoming the first to post a season with no errors and, therefore, a 1.000 fielding percentage. Kolten Wong in the pandemic-shortened 2020 season set the National League record among winners with two errors, and Phillips (2010) and Darwin Barney (2012) amassed a .996 fielding percentage to lead all National League winners. Grich has made the most putouts in a season, with 484 in 1974. Fox made 453 putouts and the same number of assists in the award's inaugural season; this is more putouts than any National League player has achieved. Mazeroski and Morgan set the National League mark, with 417 in 1967 and 1973 respectively. Sandberg's 571 assists in 1983 are the most among winners in the major leagues; the American League leader is Grich, who made 509 in 1973. Mazeroski turned the most double plays by a winner, collecting 161 in 1966. The American League leader is Fox (141 double plays in 1957).

== Key ==
Year	Links to the corresponding Major League Baseball season
PO	Putout
A	Assist
E	Error
DP	Double play
FPct	Fielding percentage
* or **	Winner of the most Gold Glove Awards at his position (** indicates tie)
†	Member of the National Baseball Hall of Fame and Museum

== American League winners ==
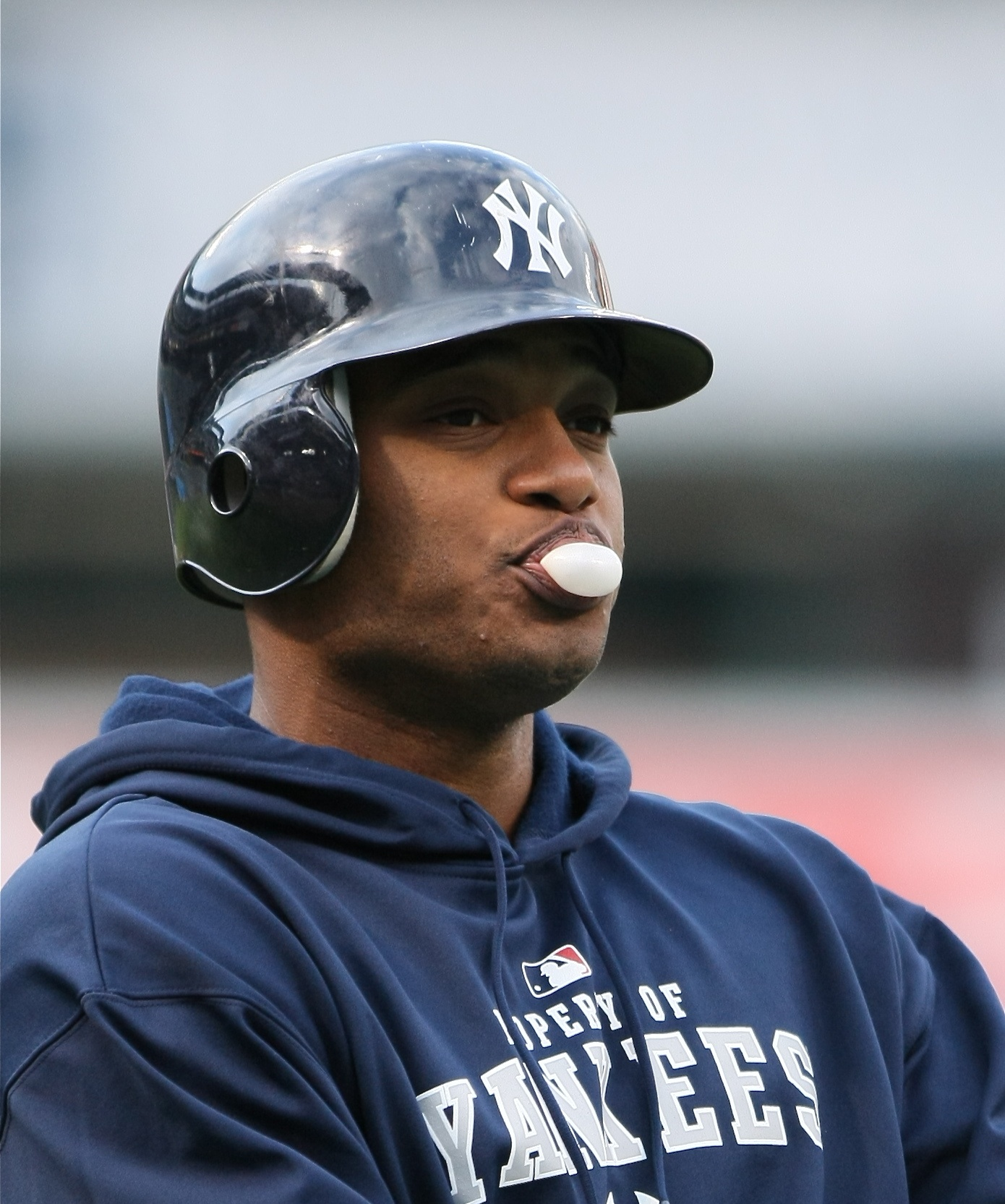
Robinson Canó (2010 and 2012 AL Gold Glove winner)

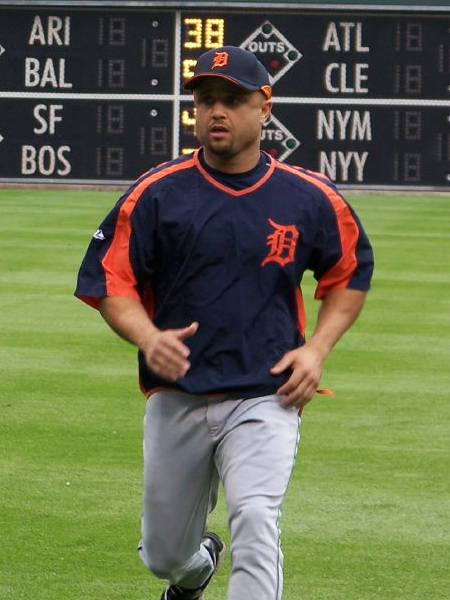
Plácido Polanco (2007, 2009 AL Gold Glove winner)

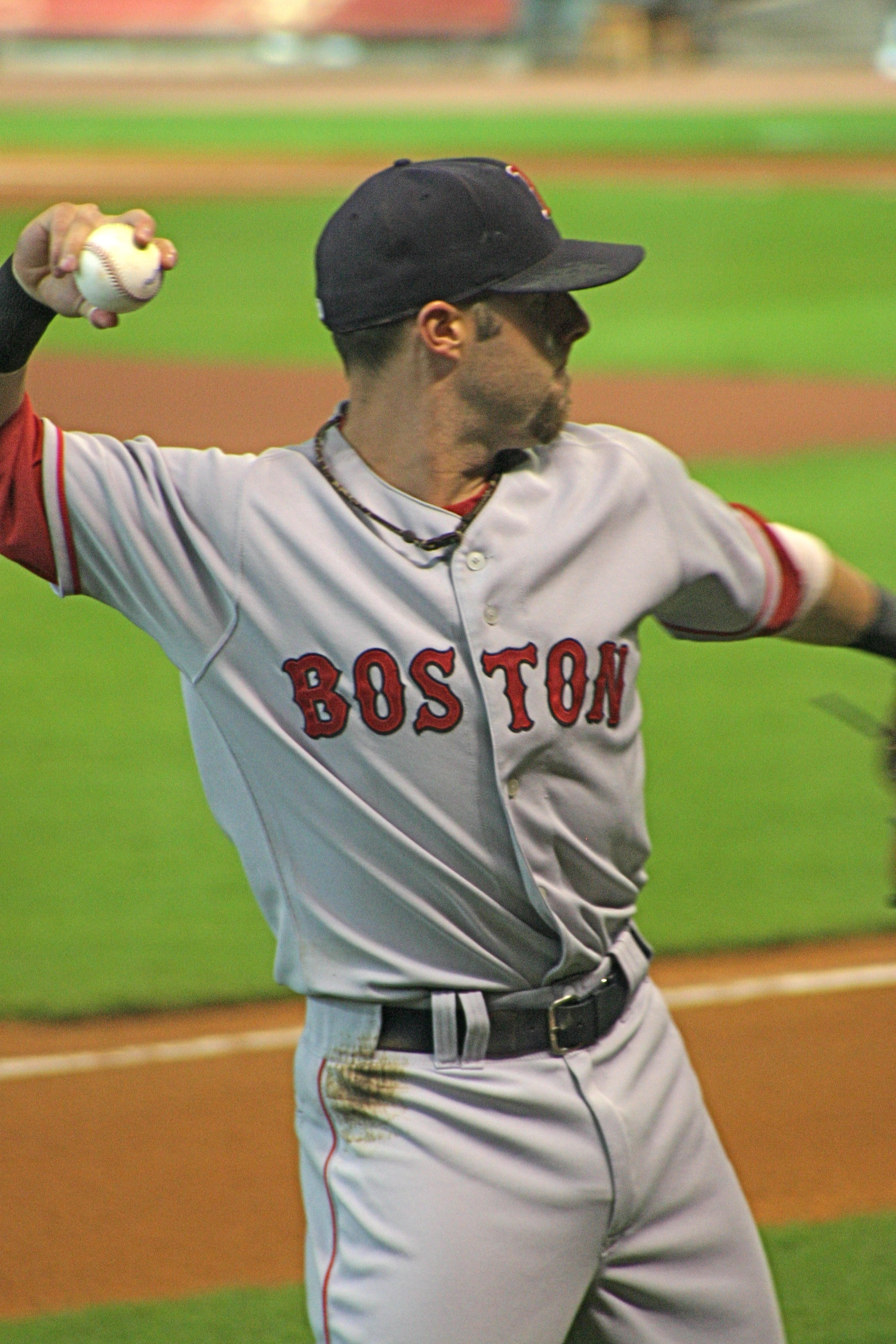
Dustin Pedroia (2008, 2011, 2013, 2014 AL Gold Glove winner)

Year	Player	Team	PO	A	E	DP	FPct	Ref
1957^{[a]}	Nellie Fox^{†}	Chicago White Sox	453	453	13	141	.986	
1958	Frank Bolling	Detroit Tigers	342	445	12	109	.985	
1959	Nellie Fox^{†}	Chicago White Sox	364	453	10	93	.988	
1960	Nellie Fox^{†}	Chicago White Sox	412	447	13	126	.985	
1961	Bobby Richardson	New York Yankees	413	376	18	136	.978	
1962	Bobby Richardson	New York Yankees	378	451	15	116	.982	
1963	Bobby Richardson	New York Yankees	335	424	12	105	.984	
1964	Bobby Richardson	New York Yankees	400	410	15	108	.982	
1965	Bobby Richardson	New York Yankees	372	403	15	121	.981	
1966	Bobby Knoop	California Angels	381	488	17	135	.981	
1967	Bobby Knoop	California Angels	386	392	11	91	.986	
1968	Bobby Knoop	California Angels	350	425	15	94	.981	
1969	Davey Johnson	Baltimore Orioles	355	369	12	93	.984	
1970	Davey Johnson	Baltimore Orioles	379	390	8	101	.990	
1971	Davey Johnson	Baltimore Orioles	361	367	12	103	.984	
1972	Doug Griffin	Boston Red Sox	321	331	15	81	.978	
1973	Bobby Grich	Baltimore Orioles	431	509	5	130	.995	
1974	Bobby Grich	Baltimore Orioles	484	453	20	132	.979	
1975	Bobby Grich	Baltimore Orioles	423	484	21	122	.977	
1976	Bobby Grich	Baltimore Orioles	389	400	12	91	.985	
1977	Frank White	Kansas City Royals	310	434	8	86	.989	
1978	Frank White	Kansas City Royals	325	385	16	96	.978	
1979	Frank White	Kansas City Royals	317	332	12	78	.982	
1980	Frank White	Kansas City Royals	395	448	10	103	.988	
1981	Frank White	Kansas City Royals	226	263	6	70	.988	
1982	Frank White	Kansas City Royals	361	389	17	99	.978	
1983	Lou Whitaker	Detroit Tigers	299	447	13	92	.983	
1984	Lou Whitaker	Detroit Tigers	290	405	15	83	.979	
1985	Lou Whitaker	Detroit Tigers	314	414	11	101	.985	
1986	Frank White	Kansas City Royals	316	439	10	91	.987	
1987	Frank White	Kansas City Royals	320	458	10	89	.987	
1988	Harold Reynolds	Seattle Mariners	303	471	18	111	.977	
1989	Harold Reynolds	Seattle Mariners	311	506	17	109	.980	
1990	Harold Reynolds	Seattle Mariners	330	499	19	110	.978	
1991	Roberto Alomar*^{†}	Toronto Blue Jays	333	447	15	79	.981	
1992	Roberto Alomar*^{†}	Toronto Blue Jays	287	378	5	66	.993	
1993	Roberto Alomar*^{†}	Toronto Blue Jays	254	439	14	92	.980	
1994	Roberto Alomar*^{†}	Toronto Blue Jays	176	275	4	71	.991	
1995	Roberto Alomar*^{†}	Toronto Blue Jays	272	367	4	84	.994	
1996	Roberto Alomar*^{†}	Baltimore Orioles	279	445	11	107	.985	
1997	Chuck Knoblauch	Minnesota Twins	283	424	11	101	.985	
1998	Roberto Alomar*^{†}	Baltimore Orioles	251	449	11	86	.985	
1999	Roberto Alomar*^{†}	Cleveland Indians	270	466	6	102	.992	
2000	Roberto Alomar*^{†}	Cleveland Indians	293	436	15	109	.980	
2001	Roberto Alomar*^{†}	Cleveland Indians	269	424	5	89	.993	
2002	Bret Boone	Seattle Mariners	251	387	7	84	.989	
2003	Bret Boone	Seattle Mariners	268	426	7	107	.990	
2004	Bret Boone	Seattle Mariners	280	350	14	90	.978	
2005	Orlando Hudson	Toronto Blue Jays	302	390	6	80	.991	
2006	Mark Grudzielanek	Kansas City Royals	261	372	4	107	.994	
2007	Plácido Polanco	Detroit Tigers	294	389	0	101	1.000	
2008	Dustin Pedroia	Boston Red Sox	279	448	6	101	.992	
2009	Plácido Polanco	Detroit Tigers	290	439	2	112	.997	
2010	Robinson Canó	New York Yankees	341	432	3	114	.996	
2011	Dustin Pedroia	Boston Red Sox	290	425	7	81	.990	
2012	Robinson Canó	New York Yankees	285	435	6	92	.992	
2013	Dustin Pedroia	Boston Red Sox	254	429	5	102	.993	
2014	Dustin Pedroia	Boston Red Sox	247	405	2	96	.997	
2015	Jose Altuve	Houston Astros	247	417	5	81	.993	
2016	Ian Kinsler	Detroit Tigers	303	432	9	109	.988	
2017	Brian Dozier	Minnesota Twins	264	405	5	109	.993	
2018	Ian Kinsler	Los Angeles Angels; Boston Red Sox	213	310	9	89	.983	
2019	Yolmer Sánchez	Chicago White Sox	248	416	9	108	.987	
2020	César Hernández	Cleveland Indians	67	139	4	33	.981	
2021	Marcus Semien	Toronto Blue Jays	202	317	8	86	.985	
2022	Andrés Giménez	Cleveland Guardians	226	317	9	70	.984	
2023	Andrés Giménez	Cleveland Guardians	259	401	6	87	.991	
2024	Andrés Giménez	Cleveland Guardians	233	396	9	93	.986	
2025	Marcus Semien	Texas Rangers	183	308	2	67	.996	
2026	Cole Young	Seattle Mariners	223	397	6	79	.990	

== National League winners ==
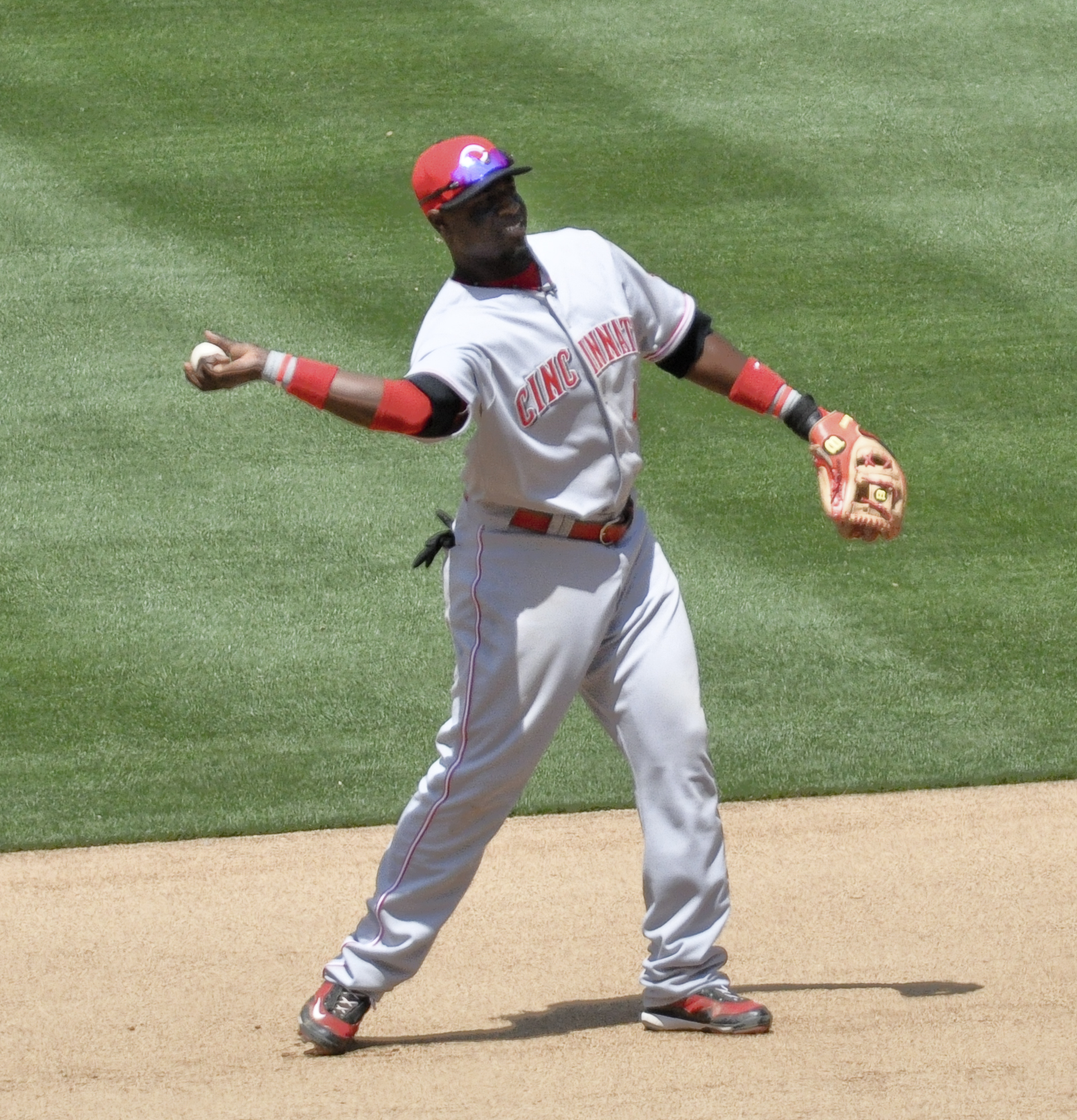
Brandon Phillips (2008, 2010–2011, 2013 NL Gold Glove winner)

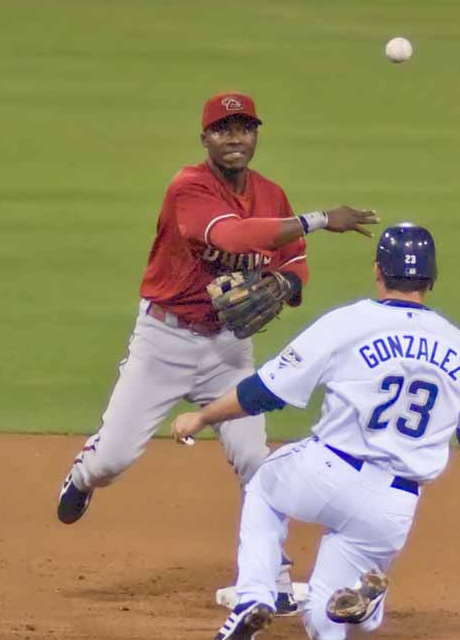
Orlando Hudson (2006–2007, 2009 NL Gold Glove winner; 2005 AL Gold Glove winner)

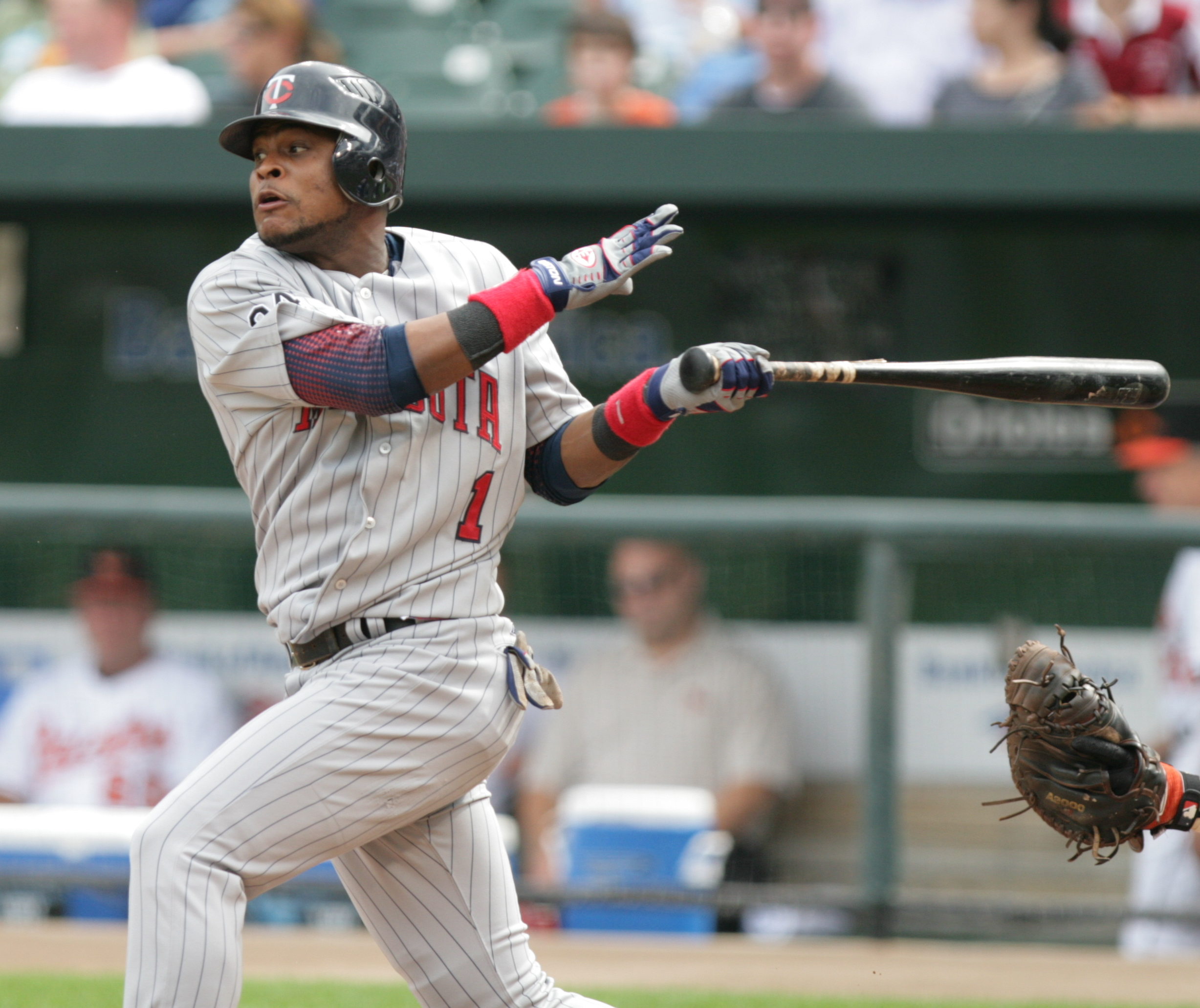
Luis Castillo (2003–2005 NL Gold Glove winner)

Year	Player	Team	PO	A	E	DP	FPct	Ref
1957^{[b]}	Nellie Fox^{†} (AL)	Chicago White Sox	453	453	13	141	.986	
1958	Bill Mazeroski^{†}	Pittsburgh Pirates	344	496	17	118	.980	
1959	Charlie Neal	Los Angeles Dodgers	386	413	9	110	.989	
1960	Bill Mazeroski^{†}	Pittsburgh Pirates	413	449	10	127	.989	
1961	Bill Mazeroski^{†}	Pittsburgh Pirates	410	505	23	144	.975	
1962	Ken Hubbs	Chicago Cubs	363	489	15	103	.983	
1963	Bill Mazeroski^{†}	Pittsburgh Pirates	340	506	14	131	.984	
1964	Bill Mazeroski^{†}	Pittsburgh Pirates	346	543	23	122	.975	
1965	Bill Mazeroski^{†}	Pittsburgh Pirates	290	439	9	113	.988	
1966	Bill Mazeroski^{†}	Pittsburgh Pirates	411	538	8	161	.992	
1967	Bill Mazeroski^{†}	Pittsburgh Pirates	417	498	18	131	.981	
1968	Glenn Beckert	Chicago Cubs	356	461	19	107	.977	
1969	Félix Millán	Atlanta Braves	373	444	17	72	.980	
1970	Tommy Helms	Cincinnati Reds	350	410	13	107	.983	
1971	Tommy Helms	Cincinnati Reds	395	468	9	130	.990	
1972	Félix Millán	Atlanta Braves	273	339	8	67	.987	
1973	Joe Morgan^{†}	Cincinnati Reds	417	440	9	106	.990	
1974	Joe Morgan^{†}	Cincinnati Reds	344	385	13	92	.982	
1975	Joe Morgan^{†}	Cincinnati Reds	356	425	11	96	.986	
1976	Joe Morgan^{†}	Cincinnati Reds	342	335	13	85	.981	
1977	Joe Morgan^{†}	Cincinnati Reds	351	359	5	100	.993	
1978	Davey Lopes	Los Angeles Dodgers	337	424	20	88	.974	
1979	Manny Trillo	Philadelphia Phillies	270	368	10	84	.985	
1980	Doug Flynn	New York Mets	283	370	6	70	.991	
1981	Manny Trillo	Philadelphia Phillies	245	286	7	61	.987	
1982	Manny Trillo	Philadelphia Phillies	343	441	5	101	.994	
1983	Ryne Sandberg^{†}	Chicago Cubs	330	571	13	126	.986	
1984	Ryne Sandberg^{†}	Chicago Cubs	314	550	6	102	.993	
1985	Ryne Sandberg^{†}	Chicago Cubs	353	500	12	99	.986	
1986	Ryne Sandberg^{†}	Chicago Cubs	309	492	5	86	.994	
1987	Ryne Sandberg^{†}	Chicago Cubs	294	375	10	84	.985	
1988	Ryne Sandberg^{†}	Chicago Cubs	291	522	11	79	.987	
1989	Ryne Sandberg^{†}	Chicago Cubs	294	466	6	80	.992	
1990	Ryne Sandberg^{†}	Chicago Cubs	278	469	8	81	.989	
1991	Ryne Sandberg^{†}	Chicago Cubs	267	515	4	66	.995	
1992	José Lind	Pittsburgh Pirates	311	428	6	78	.992	
1993	Robby Thompson	San Francisco Giants	273	384	8	95	.988	
1994	Craig Biggio^{†}	Houston Astros	225	338	7	63	.988	
1995	Craig Biggio^{†}	Houston Astros	299	419	10	78	.986	
1996	Craig Biggio^{†}	Houston Astros	361	440	10	76	.988	
1997	Craig Biggio^{†}	Houston Astros	341	504	18	108	.979	
1998	Bret Boone	Cincinnati Reds	329	416	9	100	.988	
1999	Pokey Reese	Cincinnati Reds	325	409	7	91	.991	
2000	Pokey Reese	Cincinnati Reds	289	393	14	88	.980	
2001	Fernando Viña	St. Louis Cardinals	315	383	9	100	.987	
2002	Fernando Viña	St. Louis Cardinals	287	401	13	104	.981	
2003	Luis Castillo	Florida Marlins	286	433	10	99	.986	
2004	Luis Castillo	Florida Marlins	275	406	6	97	.991	
2005	Luis Castillo	Florida Marlins	245	352	7	87	.988	
2006	Orlando Hudson	Arizona Diamondbacks	311	510	13	115	.984	
2007	Orlando Hudson	Arizona Diamondbacks	258	387	10	96	.985	
2008	Brandon Phillips	Cincinnati Reds	298	401	7	85	.990	
2009	Orlando Hudson	Los Angeles Dodgers	325	359	8	77	.988	
2010	Brandon Phillips	Cincinnati Reds	281	419	3	95	.996	
2011	Brandon Phillips	Cincinnati Reds	306	409	6	94	.990	
2012	Darwin Barney	Chicago Cubs	315	426	3	98	.996	
2013	Brandon Phillips	Cincinnati Reds	278	428	9	84	.987	
2014	DJ LeMahieu	Colorado Rockies	257	413	6	99	.991	
2015	Dee Gordon^{[a]}	Miami Marlins	293	434	6	111	.992	
2016	Joe Panik	San Francisco Giants	233	363	5	82	.992	
2017	DJ LeMahieu	Colorado Rockies	251	470	8	106	.989	
2018	DJ LeMahieu	Colorado Rockies	209	378	4	90	.993	
2019	Kolten Wong	St. Louis Cardinals	250	412	9	103	.987	
2020	Kolten Wong	St. Louis Cardinals	59	129	2	29	.989	
2021	Tommy Edman	St. Louis Cardinals	195	308	5	64	.990	
2022	Brendan Rodgers	Colorado Rockies	218	411	10	99	.984	
2023	Nico Hoerner	Chicago Cubs	226	363	7	78	.988	
2024	Brice Turang	Milwaukee Brewers	240	379	7	78	.989	
2025	Nico Hoerner	Chicago Cubs	241	367	4	75	.993	
2026	Brice Turang	Milwaukee Brewers	219	369	5	91	.992	

== See also ==
- Gold Glove middle infield duos
- List of Silver Slugger Award winners at second base

== Footnotes ==
- ^{a} ^{b} In 1957, Gold Gloves were given to the top fielders in Major League Baseball, instead of separate awards for the National and American Leagues; therefore, the winners are the same in each table.
- ^{a} Changed last name to Dee Strange-Gordon in 2020.
