= R. A. Dickey =

American baseball pitcher (born 1974)

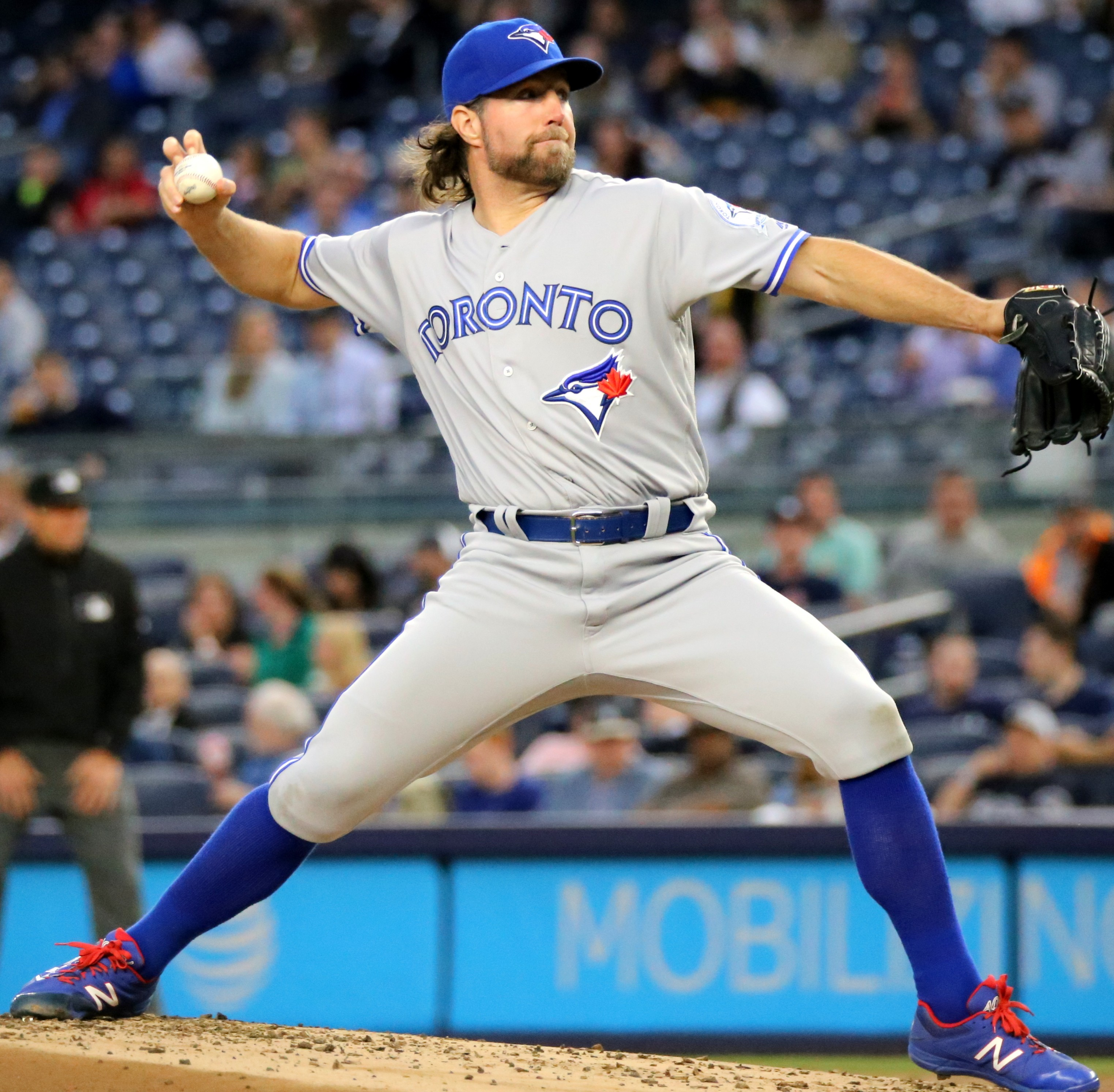
- Dickey with the Blue Jays in 2016
- Pitcher
- Born: October 29, 1974 (age 52); Nashville, Tennessee, U.S.
- Batted: Right Threw: Right

MLB debut
- April 22, 2001, for the Texas Rangers

Last MLB appearance
- September 26, 2017, for the Atlanta Braves

MLB statistics
- Win–loss record: 120–118
- Earned run average: 4.04
- Strikeouts: 1,477
- Stats at Baseball Reference

Teams
- Texas Rangers (2001, 2003–2006); Seattle Mariners (2008); Minnesota Twins (2009); New York Mets (2010–2012); Toronto Blue Jays (2013–2016); Atlanta Braves (2017)

Career highlights and awards
- All-Star (2012); NL Cy Young Award (2012); Gold Glove Award (2013); NL strikeout leader (2012)
Medals
Men's baseball
Representing United States
Olympic Games
Bronze medal – third place	1996 Atlanta	Team

Robert Allen Dickey (born October 29, 1974) is an American former professional baseball pitcher. He played in Major League Baseball (MLB) for the Texas Rangers, Seattle Mariners, Minnesota Twins, New York Mets, Toronto Blue Jays, and Atlanta Braves. Internationally, Dickey represented the United States.

After limited success in MLB as a conventional starting pitcher, Dickey learned to throw a knuckleball. In 2012, Dickey was selected to his first All-Star Game, won the Sporting News Pitcher of the Year Award, and became the first knuckleball pitcher to win the Cy Young Award after posting a 20–6 record with a league-leading 230 strikeouts. From 2013 to 2017, Dickey and Boston Red Sox pitcher Steven Wright were the only two active knuckleballers in the Majors.

== High school career ==
Dickey attended Montgomery Bell Academy in Nashville, Tennessee, where he was named the state's Gatorade Player of the Year as a senior. He was drafted by the Detroit Tigers in the 10th round (277th overall) of the 1993 MLB draft, but did not sign.

== College career ==
Dickey attended the University of Tennessee, where he played college baseball for the Tennessee Volunteers. Dickey majored in English literature at Tennessee, where he had a 3.35 GPA and was named Academic All-American. He was also named Academic All-SEC.

== Professional career ==
=== 1996–2006: Texas Rangers ===
Dickey was drafted by the Texas Rangers in the first round (18th overall) of the 1996 MLB draft. After being drafted by the Rangers, Dickey was initially offered a signing bonus of $825,000, before a Rangers team physician saw Dickey's throwing (right) arm hanging oddly in a picture of him with other Team USA players in Baseball America. The Rangers subsequently did further evaluation of Dickey, leading to the discovery of a missing ulnar collateral ligament in his right elbow joint, and reduced their offer to $75,000. Dickey has been quoted as saying, "Doctors look at me and say I shouldn't be able to turn a doorknob without feeling pain," making his ability to pitch somewhat remarkable.

Dickey debuted with the Rangers in 2001. "His stuff was dime-a-dozen, though: a high-80's fastball, an occasional fringy breaking ball, and a forkball he dubbed 'The Thing.'" The start of the 2004 season was thought to be a turning point in Dickey's career, as he managed to compile a 4–1 record through his first five starts. This hot streak was short-lived, however, and he ended up finishing the season a disappointing 6–7 with a 5.61 ERA.

==== Transition to the knuckleball ====
It was not until 2005 that Dickey discovered that his "forkball" pitch was actually a hard knuckleball, and he realized that the best way to extend his career was to perfect the pitch. At the beginning of the 2006 season, the Rangers gave Dickey a chance to try out his knuckleball at the major league level by naming him the fifth starter. However, after giving up six home runs in his first start on April 6, tying the modern era baseball record with another knuckleballer, Tim Wakefield, he was demoted to the Rangers' Triple-A minor league affiliate, the Oklahoma RedHawks.

=== 2007: Milwaukee Brewers ===
On January 13, 2007, he signed a minor league deal with the Milwaukee Brewers and spent the 2007 season with the Triple-A Nashville Sounds. After finishing the season with a 12–6 record and a 3.80 ERA, Dickey was named the Pacific Coast League Pitcher of the Year.

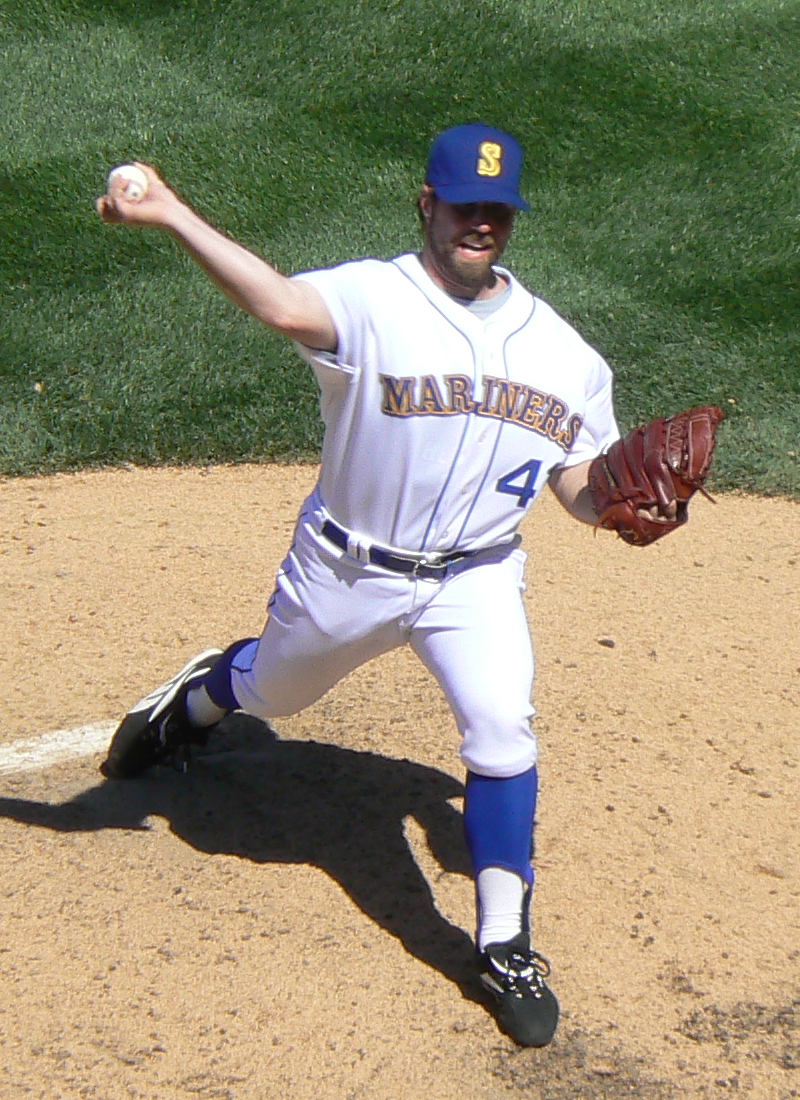
Dickey pitching for the Mariners in 2008

=== 2007–2009: Minnesota Twins & Seattle Mariners ===
Dickey became a minor league free agent after the season. On November 28, 2007, he signed a minor league contract with the Minnesota Twins that included an invitation to spring training, but he was claimed in the Rule 5 draft by the Seattle Mariners on December 6, 2007.

On March 29, 2008, the Mariners traded minor league catcher Jair Fernandez to the Twins to retain the rights for Dickey and initially optioned him to Triple-A Tacoma, recalling him to the major league club on April 14.

On August 17, 2008, Dickey tied the record for most wild pitches in an inning, with four. This came against the Twins in the fifth inning. He joins four others, including Hall of Famers Walter Johnson and fellow knuckleballer Phil Niekro, who have accomplished this feat. (Rick Ankiel threw five wild pitches in an inning during the 2000 NLDS, but postseason statistics do not count in Major League Baseball alongside those of the regular season.)

In 2008, Dickey led the majors in games started with fewer than four days of rest, with six, two ahead of teammate Miguel Batista. Dickey became a free agent after the season.

On December 23, 2008, Dickey signed a minor league contract with the Twins that included an invitation to spring training. He pitched 35 games for the Twins in 2009, starting once. He became a free agent after the season.

=== 2010–2012: New York Mets ===
On December 21, 2009, Dickey signed a minor league contract with the New York Mets, receiving an invitation to spring training. He was assigned to the Triple-A Buffalo Bisons to begin the season. While playing for the Bisons, Dickey threw a one-hitter on April 29. He gave up a single to the first batter, and then retired the next twenty-seven in a row.

On May 19, 2010, the New York Mets purchased Dickey's contract from Buffalo, and he made his first appearance as a Met against the Washington Nationals on the same day. In his debut for the Mets, Dickey pitched well, going six innings, giving up five hits, two earned runs, and striking out two, but received a no-decision. His next start, May 25 against the Philadelphia Phillies, he went six innings again, giving up 9 hits, walking 3 and striking out 7 in an 8–0 shutout for his first victory as a Met. On August 13, 2010, Dickey threw a complete game one-hit shutout of the Philadelphia Phillies — the only hit being a single surrendered to Phillies starting pitcher Cole Hamels. Dickey finished the 2010 season with a very strong ERA of 2.84, which was 7th best in the National League and 10th in all of baseball, and served as a rare bright spot on an otherwise disappointing season for the Mets. In 2010, Dickey posted career highs in Games Started (26), wins (11), complete games (2), innings pitched (174.1), strikeouts (104), ERA (2.84), WHIP (1.19), and BAA (.252).

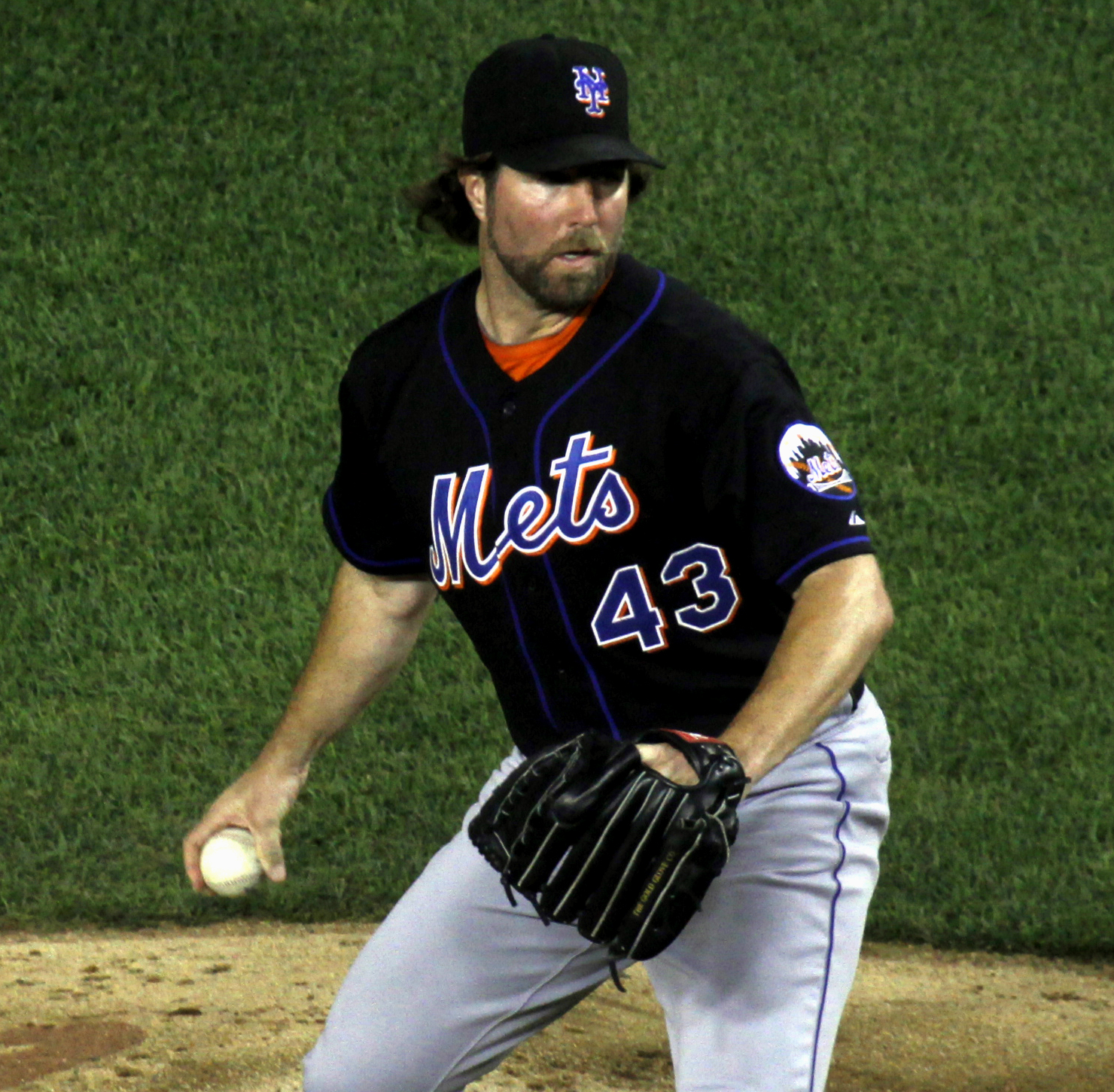
Dickey pitching for the New York Mets in 2011

On January 29, 2011, Dickey agreed to a two-year contract with the Mets. Under the agreement, Dickey received a $1 million signing bonus, $2.25 million in 2011, and $4.25 million in 2012. In addition, the Mets had a $5 million option for 2013 with a $300,000 buyout. During the 2011 season, Dickey posted career bests in game starts (32), innings pitched (208 2/3) and strikeouts (134). He finished the year with a record of only 8–13, despite a 3.28 ERA that was 12th best in the National League.

==== 2012: Cy Young Award season ====
Dickey's performance in the first half of 2012 drew comparisons to some of the most dominant pitching streaks of the last 50 years. Mets Manager Terry Collins remarked, "I've never seen anything like this. Never. I've seen some dominant pitching, but nothing like what he's going through right now." Hall of Fame pitcher and fellow knuckleballer Phil Niekro commented on Dickey, "I had a few streaks, but nothing like he's going through. I don't know if any other knuckleballer has ever been on a hot streak like he has been. He is just dynamite right now."

Dickey recorded double-digit strikeouts in back-to-back games in May, becoming the first Mets pitcher to do so since Pedro Martínez in 2006. Over the two games, Dickey allowed one run in 14 1/3 innings for an ERA of 0.63, and he was named National League Player of the Week for the week ending May 27, 2012.

In Dickey's next two starts, he pitched 16 1/3 innings, allowing no runs. During his next outing on June 13, Dickey allowed only one hit, struck out a career-high 12 batters, and walked none, facing only 29 total batters to lead the Mets to a 9–1 victory over the Tampa Bay Rays. The only hit was an infield single by B.J. Upton on a play where third baseman David Wright tried to barehand the ball but failed to field it cleanly. The Mets formally appealed the official scoring of the only hit allowed to be changed to an error on Wright, but MLB denied the appeal. Dickey was the first pitcher in the major leagues to reach 10 wins in 2012.

In his next start, Dickey pitched a complete game one-hit shutout against the Orioles, becoming the first pitcher since Dave Stieb in 1988 to throw two consecutive one-hitters. He also became only the third pitcher, after Sandy Koufax and Nolan Ryan, to have two complete game one-hitters with 12 or more strikeouts in one season, and the only pitcher to do it in back-to-back starts.

During this streak, Dickey set a new Mets franchise record of 32 2/3 consecutive scoreless innings, besting Jerry Koosman's 31 2/3 in 1973. On July 1, 2012, Dickey was named to the National League All-Star team. He was also honored with being the National League Pitcher of the Month after going 5–0 with a 0.93 ERA for the month of June. On August 31, Dickey pitched his third complete game shutout of the year. The win marked the first time a Met pitcher had reached 17 wins since Al Leiter in 1998. Dickey won his 20th game of the season on September 27, 2012, tying his career high with 13 strikeouts. For the 2012 season, Dickey set new career bests in games started (33), wins (20), complete games (5), shutouts (3), innings pitched (233 2/3), strikeouts (230), ERA (2.73), WHIP (1.05), and BAA (.226).

Dickey won the NL Cy Young Award, beating out Gio González of the Nationals and Clayton Kershaw of the Dodgers. He became the first knuckleballer in MLB history to win the award. He also became the third Met pitcher to win the award, joining Tom Seaver (1969, 1973, and 1975) and Dwight Gooden (1985).

=== 2013–2016: Toronto Blue Jays ===
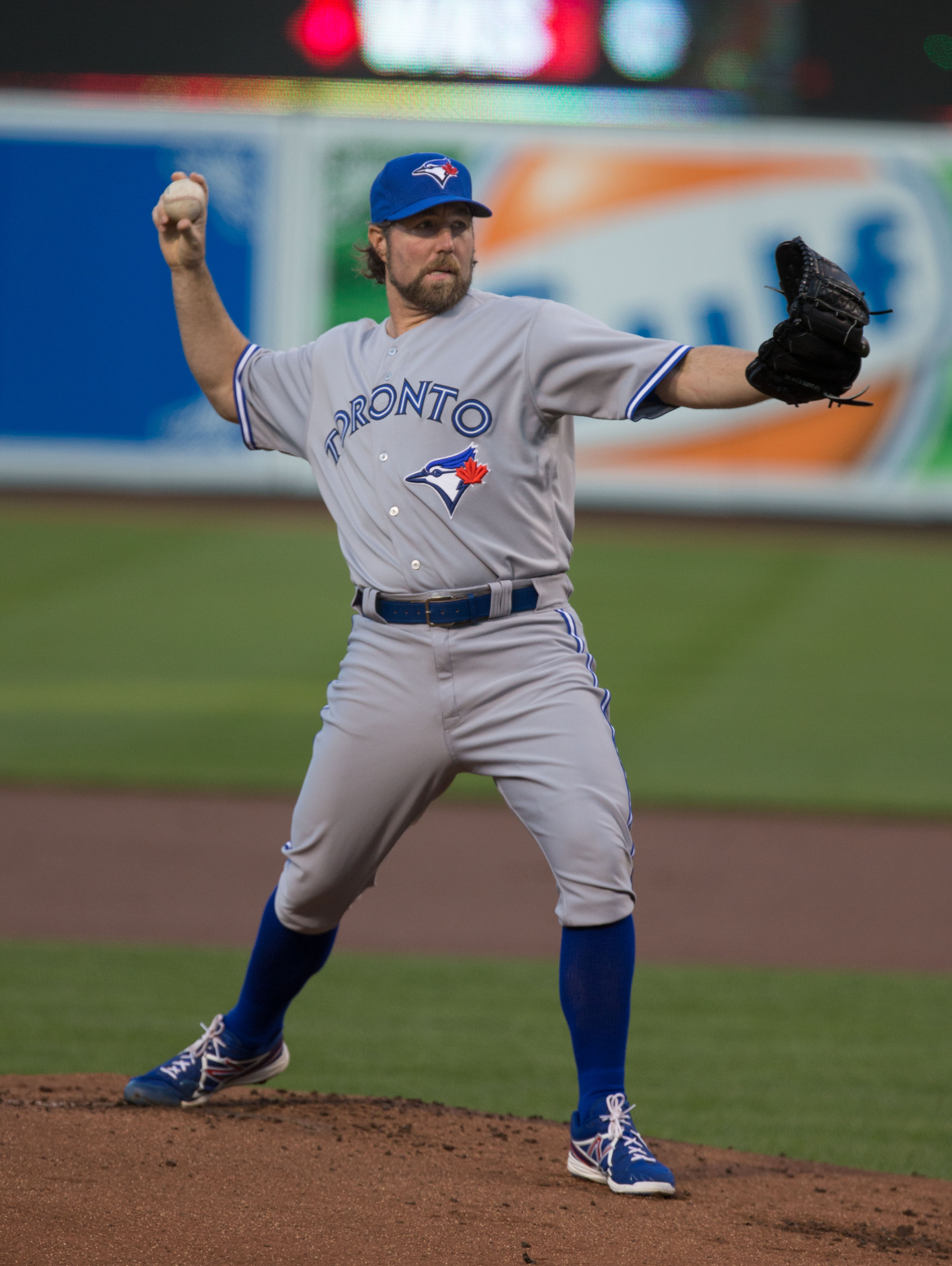
Dickey in April 2013

On December 16, 2012, the Mets agreed to trade Dickey to the Toronto Blue Jays (along with Josh Thole and Mike Nickeas) in exchange for Travis d'Arnaud, John Buck, Noah Syndergaard and Wuilmer Becerra, contingent upon his agreeing to a contract extension with the Blue Jays. The two sides agreed on December 17 to a two-year, $25 million extension with a club option for a third year in 2016 at $12 million; the deal became official once Dickey passed his physical. On February 5, 2013, manager John Gibbons said Dickey would be the opening day starter for the Blue Jays. Dickey lost his first start for his new team, giving up four runs and five hits in six innings in a loss to the Cleveland Indians. Dickey pitched his first complete game and shutout as a Blue Jay in a game against the Tampa Bay Rays on June 26. Dickey would finish his first season as a Blue Jay with a record of 14–13, an ERA of 4.21, and 177 strikeouts over 224 2/3 innings pitched.

On October 25, Dickey was announced as a finalist for the AL Pitcher's Gold Glove, along with teammate Mark Buehrle and Detroit Tigers pitcher Doug Fister. He was awarded the 2013 Pitcher's Fielding Bible on October 28, 2013, and was announced as the AL Pitcher's Gold Glove Award winner on October 29. Dickey led all American League pitchers with 40 assists and 7 defensive runs saved, and yielded only 8 stolen bases.

Dickey began the 2014 season with a 4–4 record and a 4.20 ERA through his first 10 starts. On May 24, he won his fifth game of the season, 5–2 over the AL West-leading Oakland Athletics. In doing so, he lowered his ERA to 3.95, the first time in his tenure as a Blue Jay in which his ERA had been below 4. On June 27, Dickey recorded his 1,000th career strikeout, coming against Tyler Flowers of the Chicago White Sox. He would start the final game of the Blue Jays season on September 28, against the Baltimore Orioles, and would pitch 6 innings and yield only 1 run, but Toronto would lose 1–0. Dickey finished the season with a 14–13 record, 3.71 ERA, 173 strikeouts, and a 1.23 WHIP in 34 starts totaling 215 2/3 innings.

Dickey opened the 2015 season as the number two starter in the Jays rotation. On June 18, he made his first start against the Mets since being traded in 2012, and pitched 7 1/3 innings in a 7–1 win. Dickey was placed on the bereavement list the following day after it was revealed that his father, Harry Lee Dickey, had died on June 16. At the All-Star break, Dickey had a 3–10 record and a 4.87 ERA. He would turn his season around after the break, and earned his 100th career win on September 25. Dickey pitched a little over 99 innings after the All-Star break, fourth most in the American League, resulting in eight wins with only one loss, 6th best in the AL. His ERA was a meager 2.80 over that period, which would have tied him for the best in the American League with Justin Verlander (50 inning minimum), had it not been for two other Jays starters, Marco Estrada, with a 2.78 ERA, and David Price, at 2.55. Overall Dickey finished the season with an 11–11 record, 3.91 ERA, and 126 strikeouts in 214 1/3 innings pitched. He made his postseason debut on October 12, starting game 4 of the ALDS against the Texas Rangers. At 40 years of age, Dickey became the oldest player in MLB history to make his postseason debut, pitching 4 2/3 innings before he was relieved by David Price, who would go on to earn the win. On November 3, Dickey's $12 million option for 2016 was exercised by the Blue Jays. During the offseason, he underwent surgery to repair a tear in his right meniscus.

Dickey closed the 2016 regular season with a 10–15 record, 4.46 ERA, and 126 strikeouts over 169 2/3 innings. Due to the acquisition of Francisco Liriano at the trade deadline, Dickey made only three pitching appearances in September. With the Blue Jays only needing four starters for the playoffs, Dickey was left off of the postseason roster in favor of Marcus Stroman, Aaron Sanchez, Marco Estrada, and J. A. Happ. Dickey became a free agent at the conclusion of the 2016 season. On October 27, Dickey was named a finalist for the Gold Glove Award, losing to Dallas Keuchel.

=== 2017: Atlanta Braves ===
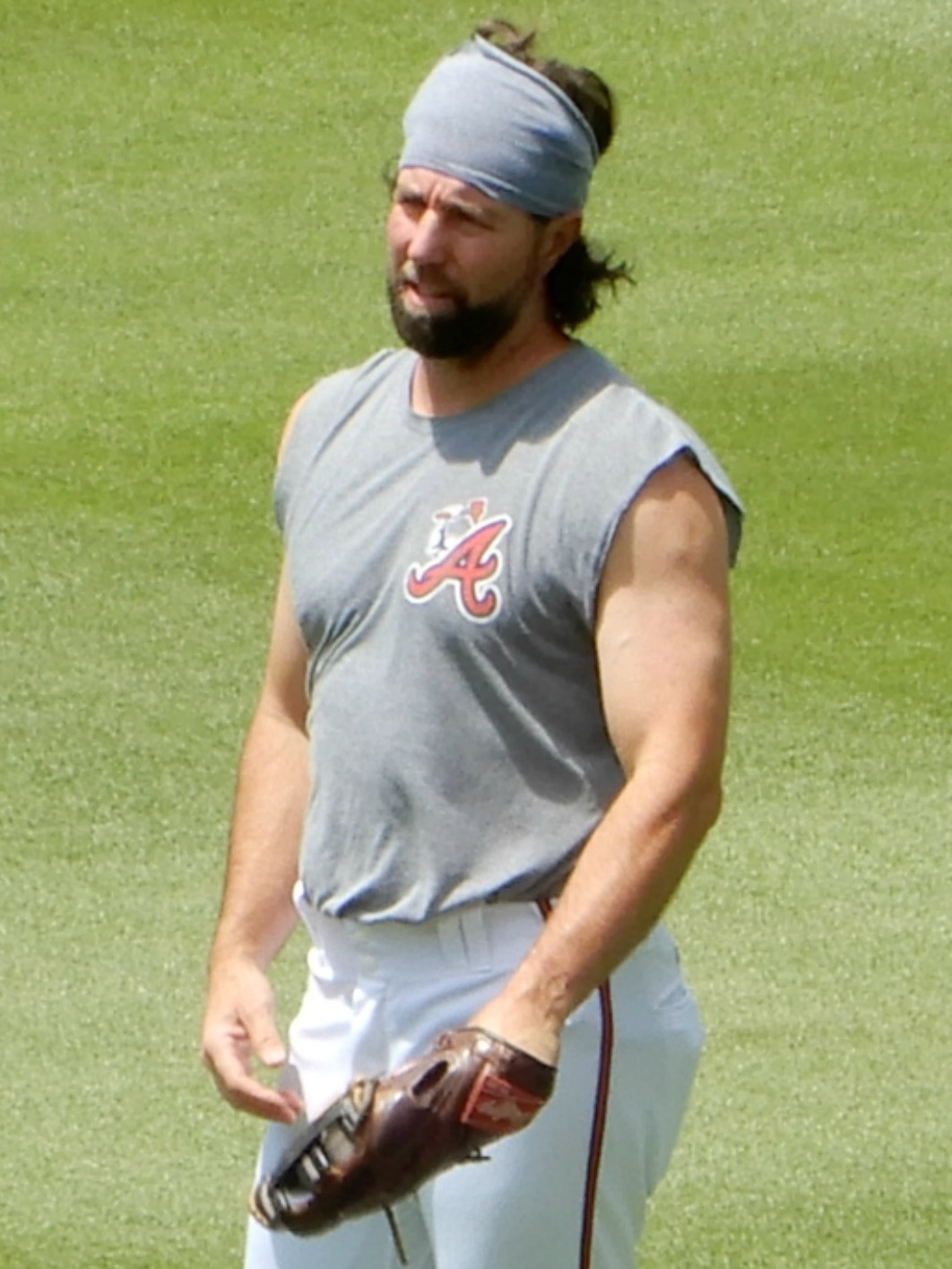
Dickey before a game with the Braves at SunTrust Park in 2017

On November 10, 2016, Dickey signed a one-year, $7.5 million contract with the Atlanta Braves that included an $8 million club option for the 2018 season, with a $500,000 buyout.

In 31 starts for the Braves in the 2017 season, Dickey had a 10–10 record with a 4.26 ERA. The Braves declined the 2018 option on Dickey, leaving him a free agent. He retired in 2018 after not being signed in free agency.

== International career ==
Dickey was a member of the Team USA at the 1996 Olympics that won a bronze medal in Atlanta. Dickey started two games, recording wins in both. Seventeen years later, Dickey once again pitched for Team USA in the 2013 World Baseball Classic. He started two games, going 0–1 after allowing 5 runs in 9 innings as the Americans finished in sixth place.

== Awards and achievements ==
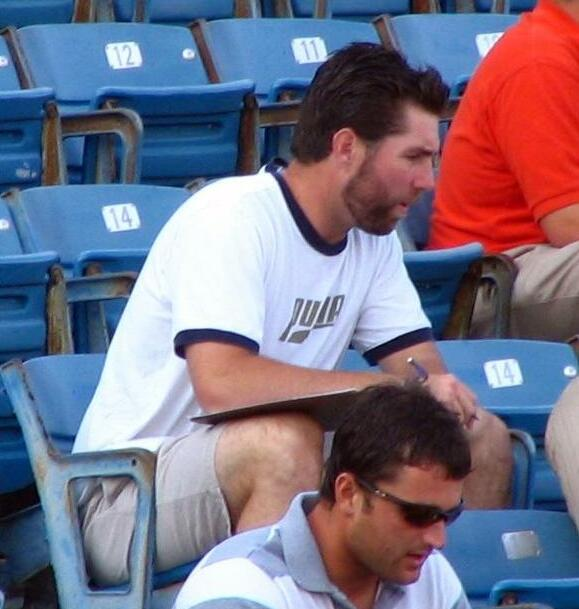
Dickey charting pitches on his day off.

- 2012 NL Cy Young Award winner
- All-Star selection (2012)
- National League Pitcher of the Month (June 2012)
- National League Player of the Week (May 27, 2012)
- Won a bronze medal at the 1996 Summer Olympics in Atlanta for Men's Baseball.
- Baseball Prospectus Cy Young Award (2012)
- Sporting News NL Pitcher of the Year (2012)
- Holds the Mets franchise record of 32 2/3 consecutive scoreless innings (set June 13, 2012). Second (to Dwight Gooden) among Mets pitchers all-time with 44 2/3 consecutive innings pitched without giving up an earned run.
- Threw two consecutive one-hitters on June 13 and 18, 2012. The last time a pitcher had thrown two consecutive one-hitters was in 1988 in the AL and 1944 in the NL. During the June 18 one-hitter, he also set a career high in strikeouts with 13. Dickey is also the only pitcher to throw consecutive one hitters and post 10+ strikeouts.
- With his June 18, 2012, win over the Orioles, he became the only pitcher in major league history to have five consecutive starts without giving up any earned runs and still getting at least eight strikeouts in each game.
- Branch Rickey Award (2012)
- National League Outstanding Pitcher of the Year (2012)
- Received an honorary degree of Doctor of Sacred Letters from Wycliffe College at the University of Toronto on May 13, 2013.

== Player profile ==
Dickey relied primarily on the knuckleball, using it around 80% of the time. His repertoire was rounded out by two-seam and four-seam fastballs (82–85 mph) and a rare changeup (76–78 mph). Dickey's knuckleball came in two forms — a "slow" knuckler in the low-to-mid 70s that has been clocked as low as 54 mph, and a "fast" one in the upper 70s, sometimes reaching as fast as 83 mph. Dickey tended to use the slow knuckleball when he was behind in the count, and used the fast one when he was ahead. However, he resorted to a fastball in most 3–0 and 3–1 counts.

== Personal life ==
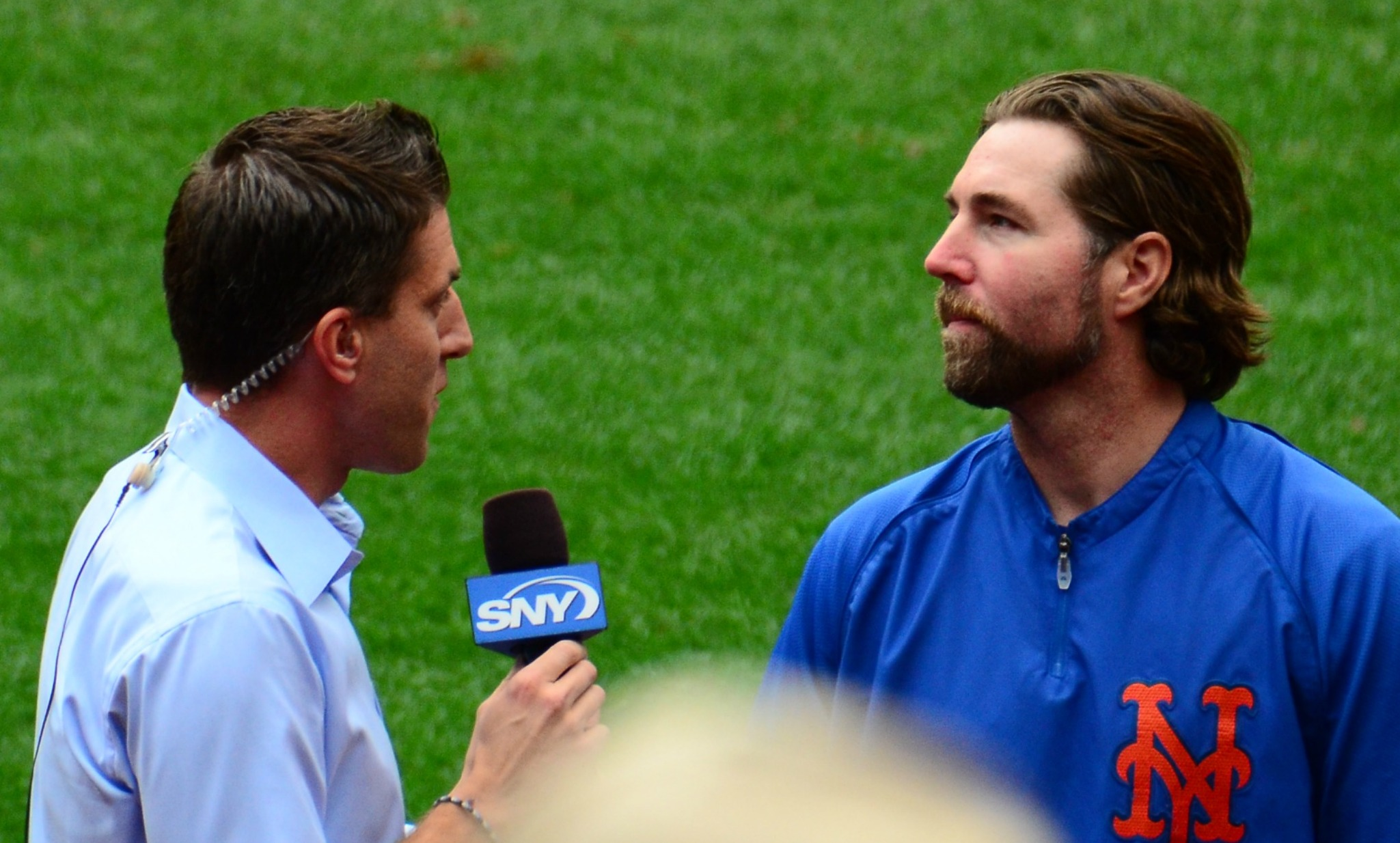
Dickey being interviewed by Kevin Burkhardt for SNY in 2012

Dickey is married and has two daughters and two sons. A born-again Christian, he helps operate the Ocala, Florida-based Honoring the Father Ministries which provides medical supplies, powdered milk, and baseball equipment to the impoverished in Latin America.

A 2010 New York Times article reported that Dickey is an avid reader; at the time, Dickey said that if he had not become a professional athlete, he would have become an English professor. Dickey named his bats for literary swords—Orcrist the Goblin Cleaver (from The Hobbit) and Hrunting (from Beowulf). Dickey mixed up Orcrist and Sting when explaining the origin of the name. Dickey's at-bat introduction song was the theme from Game of Thrones.

In November 2011, Dickey announced that he would risk his 2012 season salary ($4.25 million) to attempt to climb Mount Kilimanjaro. He credited this aspiration to his boyhood reading of Ernest Hemingway's The Snows of Kilimanjaro. While climbing Mt. Kilimanjaro, he set out to raise awareness of the issue of human trafficking in India. His climb was in support of an organization called "Bombay Teen Challenge" that ministers to victims of human trafficking and their children in the heart of the red-light districts. Dickey returned from this trip in January 2012 with Mets bullpen catcher Dave Racaniello and the Cleveland Indians starting pitcher Kevin Slowey, and together raised over $100,000.

His 2011 season was followed in the documentary film Knuckleball!

His autobiography, Wherever I Wind Up: My Quest for Truth, Authenticity and the Perfect Knuckleball, written along with New York Daily News reporter Wayne Coffey, was released in 2012. In the book Dickey wrote that, at the age of 8, a 13-year-old female babysitter sexually abused him, and subsequently a teenage male sexually abused him. He also discussed his struggles with suicidal thoughts as an adult. In September 2012, Dial Press announced a deal with Dickey to publish three books, including a children's version of his memoir.

On June 20, 2012, it was reported that Dickey was helping coach an 18-year-old knuckleball pitcher from Long Island, helping him become a walk-on pitcher for the University of Maryland Terrapins.

In 2013, Dickey appeared in a video for I Am Second describing his suicide attempt, history of abuse, and becoming a born-again Christian.

== See also ==
- List of knuckleball pitchers
- List of Major League Baseball annual shutout leaders
- List of Olympic medalists in baseball
- New York Mets award winners and league leaders
- Toronto Blue Jays award winners and league leaders

Sporting positions
Preceded by Ricky Romero	Opening Day starting pitcher for the Toronto Blue Jays; 2013–2014	Succeeded by Drew Hutchison
Preceded by Clayton Kershaw	National League Cy Young Award; 2012	Succeeded by Clayton Kershaw
