= Drew Hutchison (baseball) =

American baseball player (born 1990)

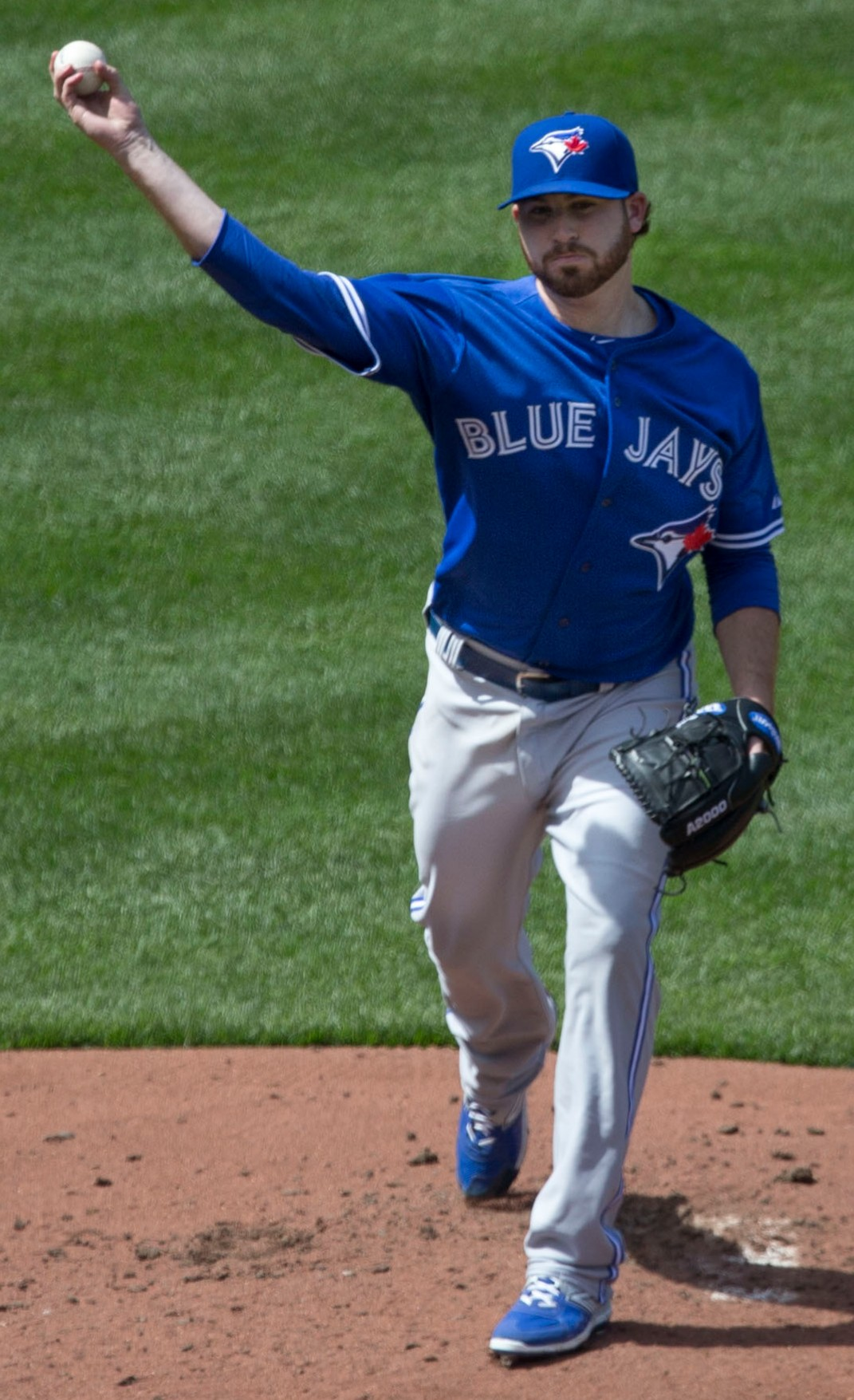
- Hutchison with the Toronto Blue Jays in 2015

Free agent
- Pitcher
- Born: August 22, 1990 (age 36); Lakeland, Florida, U.S.
- Bats: Left Throws: Right

MLB debut
- April 21, 2012, for the Toronto Blue Jays

MLB statistics (through 2022 season)
- Win–loss record: 38–33
- Earned run average: 4.89
- Strikeouts: 493
- Stats at Baseball Reference

Teams
- Toronto Blue Jays (2012, 2014–2016); Pittsburgh Pirates (2016); Philadelphia Phillies (2018); Texas Rangers (2018); Detroit Tigers (2021–2022)

Andrew Scott Hutchison (born August 22, 1990) is an American professional baseball pitcher who is a free agent. He has previously played in Major League Baseball (MLB) for the Toronto Blue Jays, Pittsburgh Pirates, Philadelphia Phillies, Texas Rangers and the Detroit Tigers.

== Career ==
=== Toronto Blue Jays ===
==== Minor leagues ====
Hutchison was drafted by the Toronto Blue Jays in the 15th round of the 2009 Major League Baseball draft from Lakeland High School in Lakeland, Florida. He made his minor league baseball debut with the Auburn Doubledays in 2010, and was later promoted to the Class-A Lansing Lugnuts. In 68 2/3 innings that year, Hutchison pitched to a 2–3 record with a 2.49 ERA and 63 strikeouts. He began the 2011 season with Lansing, and later made starts with the High-A Dunedin Blue Jays and the Double-A New Hampshire Fisher Cats. In 2011 Hutchison posted a record of 14–5 with an ERA of 2.53 and 171 strikeouts over 149 1/3 innings.

Before the 2012 season, Baseball America ranked Hutchison as the Blue Jays' ninth best prospect. He made 3 starts with New Hampshire in 2012, and posted a 2–1 record with a 2.16 ERA.

==== 2012–2013 ====
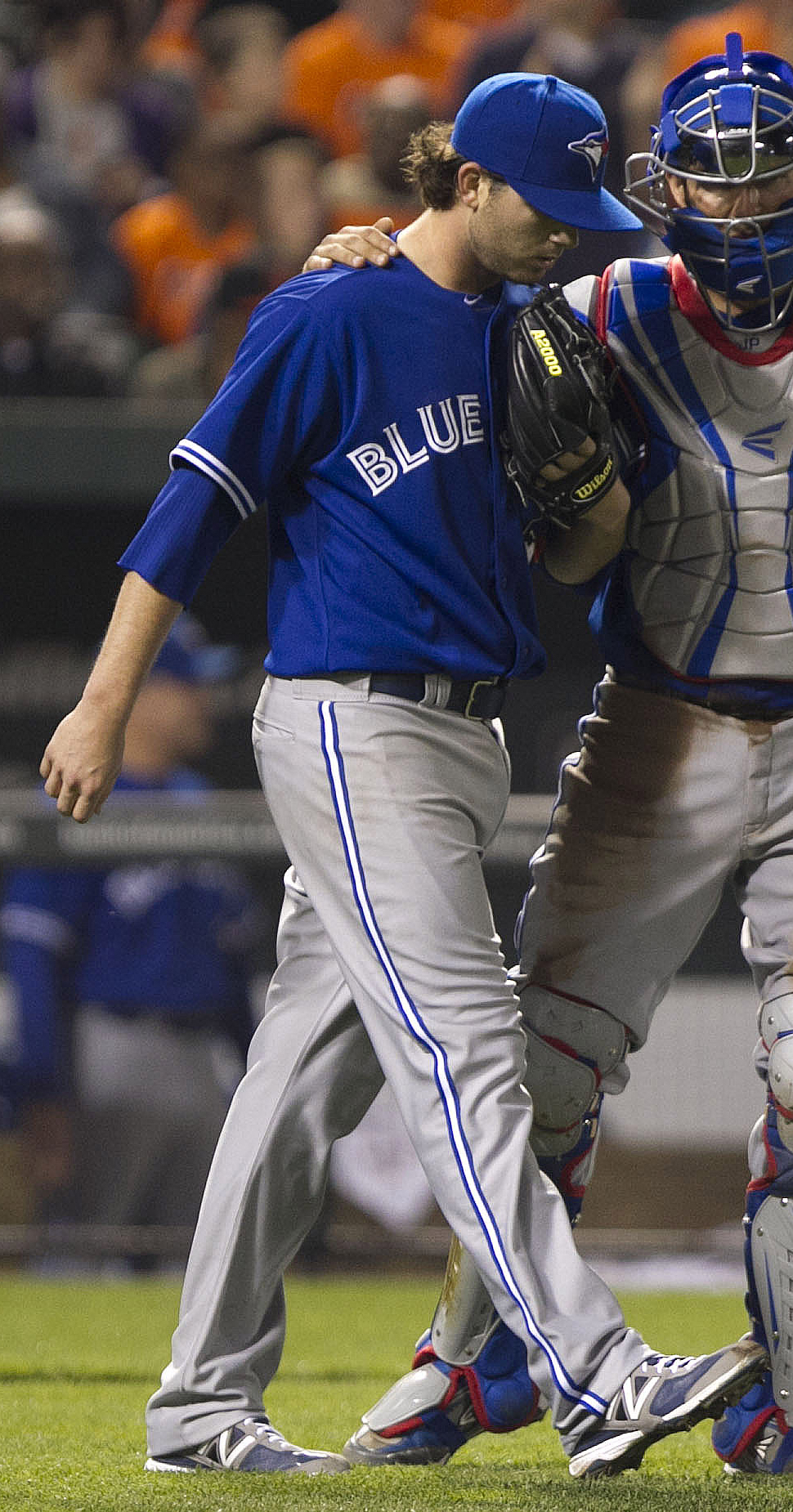
Hutchison in April 2012

The Blue Jays purchased Hutchison's contract from the Fisher Cats on April 19, 2012. He made his first MLB start on April 21, 2012, against the Kansas City Royals in Kansas City, pitching 5 1/3 innings and yielding 5 earned runs, with 4 strikeouts and 3 walks in a 9–5 win. After making 11 starts, Hutchison was placed on the 15-day disabled list with a right ulnar collateral ligament sprain. Hutchison was later transferred to the 60-day disabled list, and on August 7 it was announced that he would require Tommy John surgery to repair his injured elbow. Hutchison posted a 5–3 record with a 4.60 ERA and 49 strikeouts over 11 starts (58 2/3 innings) in his first professional season.

The Blue Jays placed Hutchison on the 60-day disabled list on March 22, 2013, to make room for Todd Redmond on their 40-man roster. On May 7, 2013, it was reported that Hutchison was on track to return in early August, one year since undergoing surgery. The Blue Jays announced on August 8 that Hutchison would start for the Triple-A Buffalo Bisons on August 9 as part of his rehab assignment. He was activated from the disabled list on August 10, and optioned to Buffalo. Hutchison did not appear for the Blue Jays in 2013, and posted a 0–4 record and 4.84 ERA in 10 minor league appearances.

==== 2014–2016 ====
Fully healthy, Hutchison entered 2014 Spring Training and earned a spot in the starting rotation. He recorded his first 2 hits in an interleague game against the Philadelphia Phillies on May 6, 2014. In a game against the Texas Rangers on May 16, Hutchison pitched his first career complete game shutout, giving up just 3 hits and 1 walk with 6 strikeouts. He established a then career-high in strikeouts, with 10, in a 4–1 win over the Milwaukee Brewers on July 1, 2014. Hutchison experienced inconsistency in his performance from June 13 to early August, posting a 6.64 ERA over 8 starts in that time span. On August 6, he pitched 8 2/3 innings and took the win against the Baltimore Orioles 5–1, yielding only 1 hit (a solo home run by Chris Davis). In doing so, he joined Dave Stieb and Roy Halladay as the only Toronto pitchers to retire 26 of 27 batters faced in a start. Hutchison struck out a career-high 11 in a game on September 16 against the Baltimore Orioles. He would record the win in his final start of the season on September 26, finishing the 2014 campaign with an 11–13 record, 4.48 ERA, and a 1.26 WHIP over 184 2/3 innings pitched. Hutchison finished 8th in the American League in both strikeouts and K/9, with 184 and 8.97 respectively.

On March 31, 2015, Hutchison was named the Opening Day starter for the Blue Jays, and became the youngest Opening Day starter in franchise history. After taking the win on Opening Day, Hutchison struggled in his next two starts. On April 23, he took a perfect game into the 6th inning against the Baltimore Orioles. He finished the day with 8 innings pitched, and yielded 2 runs on 4 hits, while striking out 8, as the Blue Jays won 7–6. On May 25, Hutchison pitched his second career complete game shutout, defeating the Chicago White Sox 6–0. He needed only 96 pitches to complete the game, yielding 4 hits and striking out 8. He would struggle with his command from that point onward, posting an ERA above 5 into August. After earning his 12th win of the season on August 16, Hutchison was optioned to Triple-A Buffalo, as the Blue Jays did not need a fifth starter until August 29. Hutchison received the most run support in the American league leading him to record 12 wins in 28 starts despite posting an ERA of 5.57.

On January 16, 2016, Hutchison and the Blue Jays avoided salary arbitration by agreeing to a one-year, $2.2 million contract. Hutchison entered spring training in competition for the fifth starter role with Aaron Sanchez, Gavin Floyd, and Jesse Chavez. On March 28, it was announced that Sanchez would be the team's fifth starter, and Hutchison would be optioned to the Triple-A Buffalo Bisons. Bisons manager Gary Allenson announced on April 5 that Hutchison would start on Opening Day against the Pawtucket Red Sox. While successful at Triple-A, Hutchison was described as "a pitcher who’s too good for the minor leagues but doesn’t have a place on the big league club", since he was placed sixth on the depth chart of the Jays' starting rotation. Hutchison was recalled by the Blue Jays on April 23 for a spot start against the Oakland Athletics the next day. He was optioned back to Buffalo after the game. On July 2, Hutchison was recalled from Triple-A. He would make two more appearances for Toronto; the latter one a start against the Detroit Tigers in place of Marco Estrada, who was unable to play due to lower back pain. He was returned to Buffalo the following day.

=== Pittsburgh Pirates ===
On August 1, 2016, the Blue Jays traded Hutchison to the Pittsburgh Pirates for Francisco Liriano, Reese McGuire, and Harold Ramírez. Hutchison was assigned to the Pirates' Triple-A affiliate, the Indianapolis Indians. He was recalled on September 6. In six appearances for Pittsburgh in 2016, Hutchison posted a 5.56 ERA and 10 strikeouts in 11 1/3 innings.

After struggling in 2017 spring training, Hutchison was optioned to Triple-A Indianapolis on March 29. He cleared waivers and was sent outright to Indianapolis on September 15 to remove him from the 40-man roster. On October 2, 2017, Hutchison elected free agency.

=== Philadelphia Phillies ===
On February 15, 2018, Hutchison signed a minor league contract with the Philadelphia Phillies that included an invitation to spring training. The Phillies added him to their active roster on March 25. He was designated for assignment on May 31, 2018. After clearing waivers, Hutchison elected free agency on June 5.

=== Los Angeles Dodgers ===
On June 16, 2018, he signed a minor league contract with the Los Angeles Dodgers. He was 4–1 with a 2.14 ERA in nine games (seven starts) for the Triple-A Oklahoma City Dodgers before he opted out of his minor league contract on July 31.

=== Texas Rangers ===
On August 4, 2018, Hutchison signed a major league contract with the Texas Rangers. He was added to the 25 man roster, and he started against the Baltimore Orioles on August 5.

=== New York Yankees ===
On January 10, 2019, Hutchison signed a minor league contract with the New York Yankees that included an invitation to spring training. He was released on June 17, 2019.

=== Minnesota Twins ===
Hutchison signed a minor league deal with the Minnesota Twins on June 21, 2019, and was assigned to the Triple-A Rochester Red Wings.

=== Los Angeles Angels ===
On August 7, 2019, Hutchison was traded to the Los Angeles Angels in exchange for cash considerations. In 4 starts for the Triple–A Salt Lake Bees, he compiled a 3–0 record and 3.97 ERA with 20 strikeouts over 22 2/3 innings pitched. Hutchison elected free agency following the season on November 4.

=== Milwaukee Milkmen ===
On August 9, 2020, Hutchison signed with the Milwaukee Milkmen of the American Association. In 6 starts, he logged a 2–2 record and 4.09 ERA with 33 strikeouts in 22.0 innings pitched. Hutchison won the American Association championship with the Milkmen in 2020. He was released by the club on November 12.

=== Detroit Tigers ===
==== 2021 ====
On February 28, 2021, Hutchison signed a minor league contract with the Detroit Tigers organization. The Tigers selected Hutchison's contract on August 15, 2021, and he made his debut with the team that afternoon in a start against the Cleveland Indians. Hutchison started 2 games for the Tigers, giving up 7 runs (2 earned) with 2 strikeouts through 6 innings pitched. On August 23, Hutchison was designated for assignment following the return of outfielder Akil Baddoo from the injured list. On August 26, Hutchison cleared waivers and was assigned outright to the Triple-A Toledo Mudhens. The Tigers again selected Hutchison's contract on September 7, 2021. He earned his first win as a Tiger on September 8 with two scoreless innings of relief against the Pittsburgh Pirates. He made 9 appearances (2 starts) for the Tigers in 2021, posting a 3–1 record and 2.11 ERA. On November 5, Hutchison was outrighted off of the 40-man roster and elected free agency.

==== 2022 ====
On March 14, 2022, Hutchison re-signed with the Tigers on a minor league deal, with an invitation to spring training. He made the Tigers opening day roster. Hutchison was designated for assignment on May 11 after appearing in 10 games. He cleared waivers and elected free agency on May 13. He re-signed a minor league deal with the Tigers on May 19. The Tigers once again selected Hutchison's contract on June 14 and added him to the active roster. Hutchison was again designated for assignment immediately after his start on June 19. Hutchison again cleared waivers and elected free agency on June 22. He once again re-signed a minor league deal with the Tigers on June 27. On July 5, 2022, the Tigers selected Hutchison's contract and added him to the active roster. This would be the fifth time in less than a year that his contract was selected. On July 10, Hutchison allowed two runs in six innings in a no-decision against the Chicago White Sox, earning his first quality start since 2015. On the season, he went 3–9 with a 4.53 ERA. He was designated for assignment again on October 11, and subsequently elected free agency.

=== Toronto Blue Jays (second stint) ===
On January 6, 2023, Hutchison signed a minor league contract with the Toronto Blue Jays organization. In 9 starts for the Triple-A Buffalo Bisons, he registered a 2–2 record and 5.66 ERA with 31 strikeouts in 35.0 innings pitched. On June 2, Hutchison was released by the Blue Jays.

=== Philadelphia Phillies (second stint) ===
On June 8, 2023, Hutchison signed a minor league contract with the Philadelphia Phillies. In 15 starts for the Triple–A Lehigh Valley IronPigs, he registered a 4–4 record and 5.62 ERA with 62 strikeouts across 75 1/3 innings pitched. Hutchison elected free agency following the season on November 6.

=== Tecolotes de los Dos Laredos ===
On March 8, 2024, Hutchison signed with the Tecolotes de los Dos Laredos of the Mexican League. In 3 starts for Dos Laredos, he struggled to a 1–2 record and 10.24 ERA with 8 strikeouts across 9 2/3 innings pitched.

In 2025, he spent the entire season on the reserve list and did not appear in a game for the club.

Sporting positions
Preceded by R. A. Dickey	Opening Day starting pitcher for the Toronto Blue Jays; 2015	Succeeded by Marcus Stroman
