= List of Toronto Blue Jays Opening Day starting pitchers =

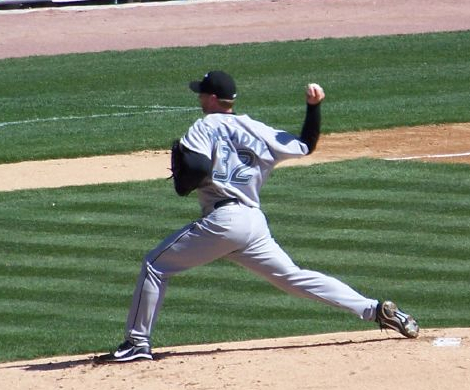
Roy Halladay, the Opening Day starting pitcher from 2003 to 2009

The Toronto Blue Jays are a Major League Baseball (MLB) team based in Toronto, Ontario. They play in the American League East division. The Blue Jays first played their home games at Exhibition Stadium until 1989, when they moved into the SkyDome, which was renamed Rogers Centre in 2005. The first game of the new baseball season for a team is played on Opening Day, and being named the Opening Day starter is an honour, which is often given to the player who is expected to lead the pitching staff that season, though there are various strategic reasons why a team's best pitcher might not start on Opening Day. The Blue Jays have used 25 different Opening Day starting pitchers in their 43 seasons. The 25 starters have a combined Opening Day record of 15 wins, 16 losses and 12 no decisions. No decisions are only awarded to the starting pitcher if the game is won or lost after the starting pitcher has left the game.

The Blue Jays first Opening Day starting pitcher was Bill Singer, who received a no decision against the Chicago White Sox. Roy Halladay holds the Blue Jays' record for most Opening Day starts with seven consecutively from 2003 to 2009, and has an Opening Day record of 3–3. Halladay also has the most starts at home with four. Dave Lemanczyk has the worst winning percentage as the Opening Day starting pitcher with a record of 0–2, both of which were pitched away from Exhibition Stadium.

Overall, the Blue Jays' Opening Day starting pitchers have a record of 0 wins and 1 loss at Exhibition Stadium, and 6 wins and 4 losses at SkyDome/Rogers Centre. In addition, although the Blue Jays were nominally the home team on Opening Day 2001, the game was played in Hiram Bithorn Stadium in Hato Rey, Puerto Rico. Esteban Loaiza started the game in Hato Rey and won, making the Blue Jays' Opening Day starting pitchers' combined home record 6 wins and 4 losses, and their away record 6 wins and 9 losses. The Blue Jays went on to play in the American League Championship Series playoff games in 1985, 1989 and 1991, and won the World Series in 1992 and 1993. Dave Stieb, Jimmy Key and Jack Morris were the Opening Day starting pitchers those years, and had a combined Opening Day record of 2 wins and 3 losses.

The Blue Jays and the Cleveland Indians currently hold the record for the longest Opening Day game in Major League history. They set that record on Opening Day 2012, when Jairo Asencio of the Indians gave up a 3-run home run in the top of the 16th inning to give the Blue Jays the win. This broke the record of 15 innings set between the Indians and the Detroit Tigers in 1960.

The Blue Jays would later participate in the ALCS in 2015 and 2016.

== Key ==
Season	Each year is linked to an article about that particular Blue Jays season.
W	Win
L	Loss
ND (W)	No decision by starting pitcher; Blue Jays won game
ND (L)	No decision by starting pitcher; Blue Jays lost game
Pitcher (#)	Number of appearances as Opening Day starter with the Blue Jays
*	Advanced to the postseason
**	American League champions
†	World Series Champions

== Pitchers ==
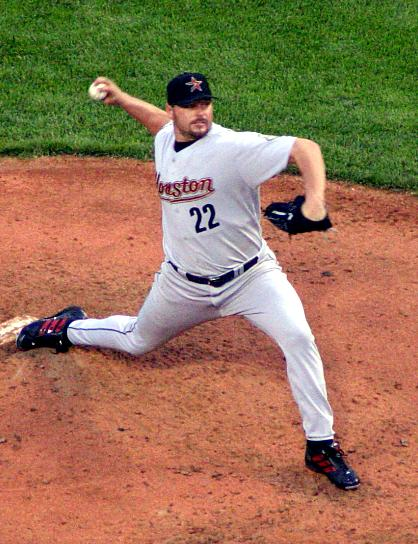
Roger Clemens, the 1998 Opening Day starting pitcher

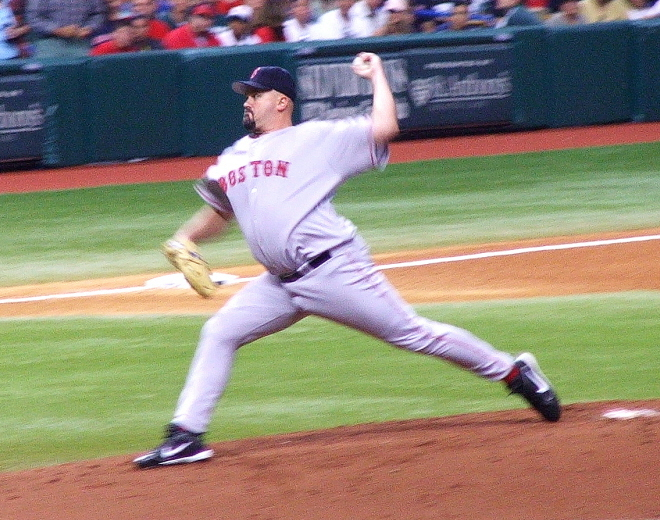
David Wells, the 2000 Opening Day starting pitcher

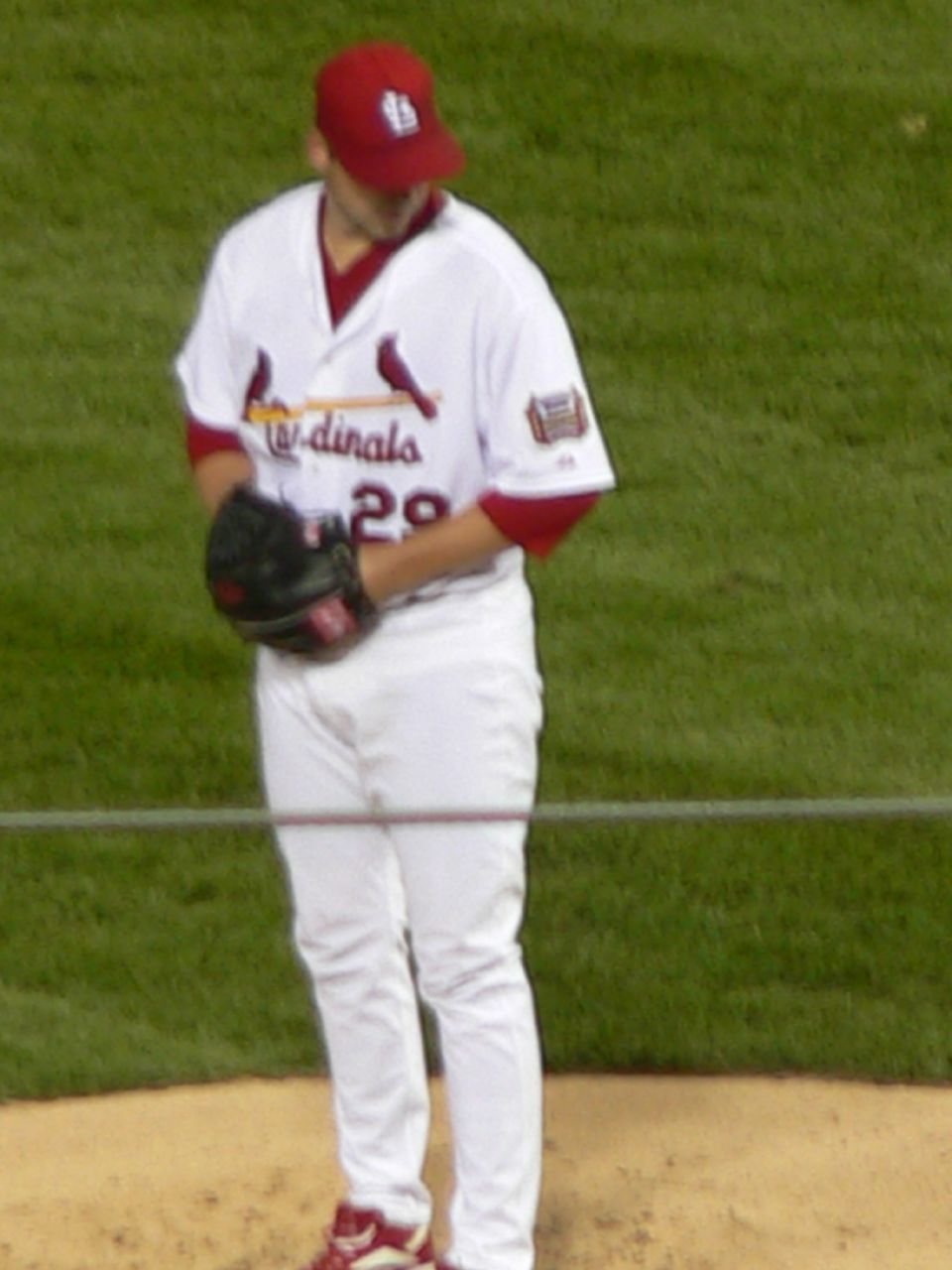
Chris Carpenter, the 2002 Opening Day starting pitcher

Season	Pitcher	Decision	Opponent	Location	Ref(s)
1977	Bill Singer	ND (W)	Chicago White Sox	Exhibition Stadium	
1978	Dave Lemanczyk	L	Detroit Tigers	Tiger Stadium	
1979	Tom Underwood	L	Kansas City Royals	Kauffman Stadium	
1980	Dave Lemanczyk (2)	L	Seattle Mariners	Kingdome	
1981	Jim Clancy	ND (L)	Detroit Tigers	Tiger Stadium	
1982	Mark Bomback	L	Milwaukee Brewers	Exhibition Stadium	
1983	Dave Stieb	W	Boston Red Sox	Fenway Park	
1984	Jim Clancy (2)	ND (L)	Seattle Mariners	Kingdome	
1985*	Dave Stieb (2)	L	Kansas City Royals	Kauffman Stadium	
1986	Dave Stieb (3)	L	Texas Rangers	Arlington Stadium	
1987	Jimmy Key	ND (W)	Cleveland Indians	Exhibition Stadium	
1988	Jimmy Key (2)	W	Kansas City Royals	Kauffman Stadium	
1989*	Jimmy Key (3)	W	Kansas City Royals	Kauffman Stadium	
1990	Todd Stottlemyre	L	Texas Rangers	Arlington Stadium	
1991*	Dave Stieb (4)	L	Boston Red Sox	SkyDome	
1992†	Jack Morris	W	Detroit Tigers	Tiger Stadium	
1993†	Jack Morris (2)	L	Seattle Mariners	Kingdome	
1994	Juan Guzmán	W	Chicago White Sox	SkyDome	
1995	David Cone	W	Oakland Athletics	SkyDome	
1996	Erik Hanson	W	Oakland Athletics	Cashman Field	
1997	Pat Hentgen	ND (L)	Chicago White Sox	SkyDome	
1998	Roger Clemens	W	Minnesota Twins	SkyDome	
1999	Pat Hentgen (2)	L	Minnesota Twins	Hubert H. Humphrey Metrodome	
2000	David Wells	ND (W)	Kansas City Royals	SkyDome	
2001	Esteban Loaiza	W	Texas Rangers	Hiram Bithorn Stadium	
2002	Chris Carpenter	ND (W)	Boston Red Sox	Fenway Park	
2003	Roy Halladay	L	New York Yankees	SkyDome	
2004	Roy Halladay (2)	L	Detroit Tigers	SkyDome	
2005	Roy Halladay (3)	W	Tampa Bay Devil Rays	Tropicana Field	
2006	Roy Halladay (4)	W	Minnesota Twins	Rogers Centre	
2007	Roy Halladay (5)	ND (W)	Detroit Tigers	Comerica Park	
2008	Roy Halladay (6)	L	New York Yankees	Yankee Stadium	
2009	Roy Halladay (7)	W	Detroit Tigers	Rogers Centre	
2010	Shaun Marcum	ND (L)	Texas Rangers	Rangers Ballpark in Arlington	
2011	Ricky Romero	W	Minnesota Twins	Rogers Centre	
2012	Ricky Romero (2)	ND (W)	Cleveland Indians	Progressive Field	
2013	R. A. Dickey	L	Cleveland Indians	Rogers Centre	
2014	R. A. Dickey (2)	L	Tampa Bay Rays	Tropicana Field	
2015*	Drew Hutchison	W	New York Yankees	Yankee Stadium	
2016*	Marcus Stroman	W	Tampa Bay Rays	Tropicana Field	
2017	Marco Estrada	ND (L)	Baltimore Orioles	Oriole Park at Camden Yards	
2018	J. A. Happ	L	New York Yankees	Rogers Centre	
2019	Marcus Stroman (2)	ND (L)	Detroit Tigers	Rogers Centre	
2020*	Hyun-jin Ryu	ND (W)	Tampa Bay Rays	Tropicana Field	
2021	Hyun-jin Ryu (2)	ND (W)	New York Yankees	Yankee Stadium	
2022*	Jose Berrios	ND (W)	Texas Rangers	Rogers Centre	
2023*	Alek Manoah	ND (W)	St. Louis Cardinals	Busch Stadium	
2024	Jose Berrios (2)	W	Tampa Bay Rays	Tropicana Field	
2025**	Jose Berrios (3)	L	Baltimore Orioles	Rogers Centre	
2026	Kevin Gausman	ND (W)	Athletics	Rogers Centre	
