= Ricky Romero =

American baseball player (born 1984)

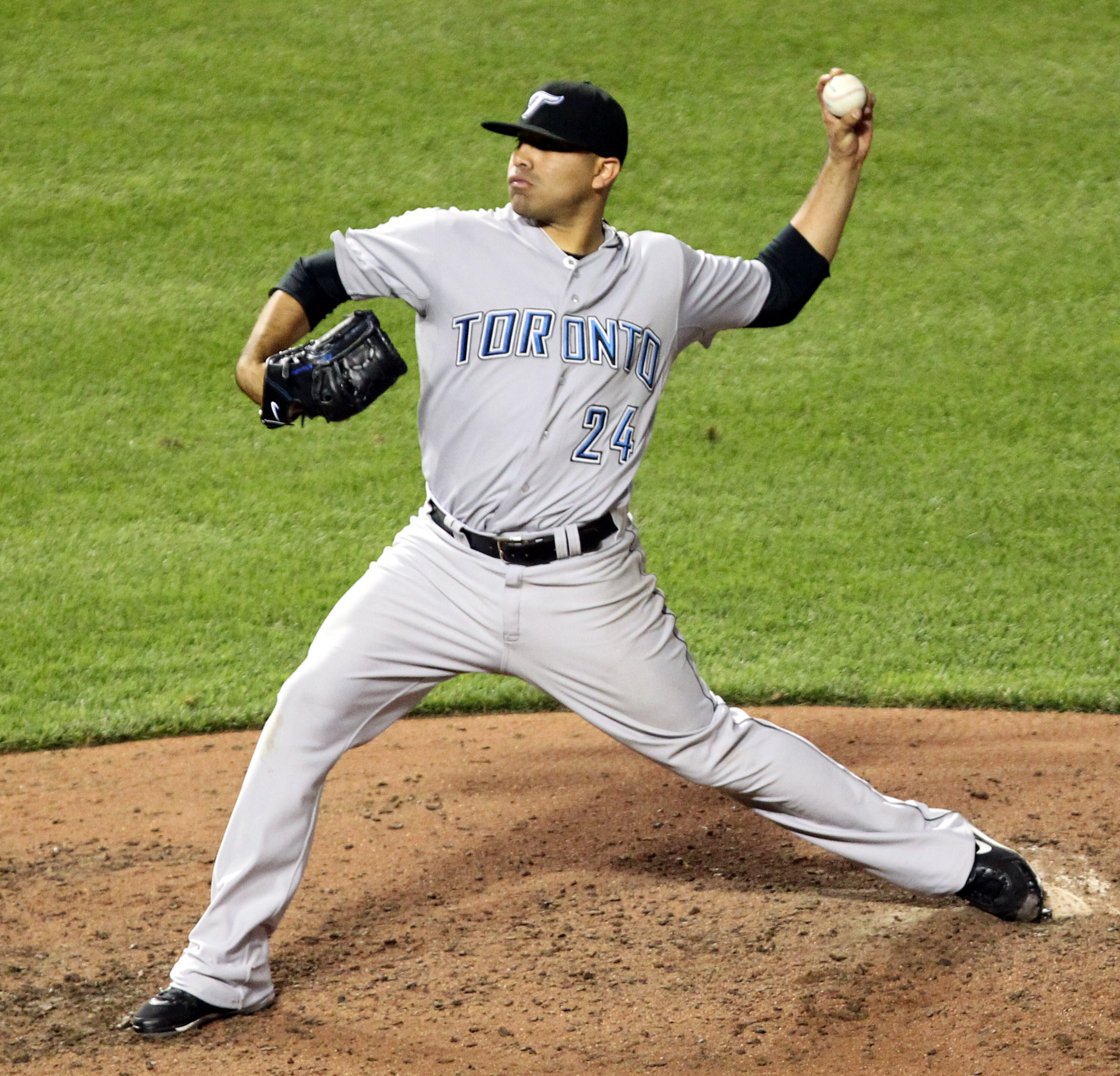
- Romero with the Toronto Blue Jays in 2011
- Pitcher
- Born: November 6, 1984 (age 42); East Los Angeles, California, U.S.
- Batted: Right Threw: Left

MLB debut
- April 9, 2009, for the Toronto Blue Jays

Last MLB appearance
- September 25, 2013, for the Toronto Blue Jays

MLB statistics
- Win–loss record: 51–45
- Earned run average: 4.16
- Strikeouts: 622
- Stats at Baseball Reference

Teams
- Toronto Blue Jays (2009–2013)

Career highlights and awards
- All-Star (2011)

Ricardo Romero Jr. (born November 6, 1984) is an American former professional baseball pitcher. He played in Major League Baseball (MLB) for the Toronto Blue Jays.

== Prep career ==
After spending three years at Garfield High School, Romero graduated from Theodore Roosevelt High School in East Los Angeles. In his senior year he was named L.A. City Section co-player of the year and Eastern League co-MVP for baseball, going (12–1) with a 0.53 ERA and 162 strikeouts for the Rough Riders.

== College career ==
Upon graduation, Romero attended Cal State Fullerton from 2001 to 2005. The lefty starter helped the Titans capture a National Title in the 2004 College World Series, pitching the team into the semifinals past Miami (FL) and winning game one of the World Series against Texas. He was also selected to the All-Tournament team for that season and played for the U.S. National Team pitching to a (3–1) record with a 1.57 ERA. In 2005, he led Fullerton in wins (13) and the Titans returned to the World Series.

== Professional career ==
=== Toronto Blue Jays ===
==== Minor leagues ====
Romero was drafted by the Toronto Blue Jays as the sixth overall pick (and first pitcher selected) in the 2005 Major League Baseball draft. After signing with Toronto in June of that year, with a signing bonus of $2.1 million, Romero made his professional debut for the Auburn Doubledays of the Low-A New York–Penn League. He was promoted to the Single-A Dunedin Blue Jays after that appearance. Both 2006 and 2007 were short, injury-riddled seasons for the southpaw, with Romero suffering from shoulder and elbow problems. Finally healthy in 2008, Romero struggled with control problems with a career high 55 walks for the Double-A New Hampshire Fisher Cats. He received a late year call up to the Triple-A Syracuse Chiefs and earned Player of the Week honors as a member of the Chiefs on September 1.

==== 2009–2010 ====
On March 30, 2009, Blue Jays manager Cito Gaston announced that Romero had earned one of the two open rotation spots for the 2009 MLB season. This came after a strong 7-inning spring training outing against the Houston Astros.

On April 9, Romero made his Major League debut against the Detroit Tigers, opposite Tigers rookie pitcher Rick Porcello. The game marked the first time in MLB history that two first-round picks faced each other in their respective debuts. Romero earned the win while surrendering two runs on seven hits over six innings in the Blue Jays' 6–2 victory. Romero pitched strongly in his next two starts, getting a no-decision against the Minnesota Twins, and defeating the Oakland Athletics. He had a 2–0 record and a 1.71 ERA in his first three starts, but was placed on the 15-day disabled list on April 20 with a strained right oblique muscle after a violent sneeze. The Jays, surprising many observers by holding first place for the month of April despite many injuries to their key pitchers, hoped he would be ready to return to their lineup by mid-May. Romero was called up from Triple A Las Vegas 51's along with Casey Janssen, after a successful rehab assignment in the minor leagues to evaluate his progress. After struggling somewhat upon his return, Romero found an outstanding run of form in late June and early July, defeating the World Series champion Philadelphia Phillies (June 26), the American League champion Tampa Bay Rays (July 1), and the perennial powerhouse New York Yankees (July 6) in three successive starts. On July 6, Romero tied the Blue Jays rookie record for consecutive scoreless innings with 24 against the NY Yankees, before giving up a home run to Eric Hinske in the fifth inning. Jays' manager Cito Gaston said Romero was by this time considered the team's #2 starter, behind Roy Halladay.

Romero was rumoured to be one of the leading candidates for the 2009 MLB Rookie of the Year award during the first half of the season. Others included Chicago White Sox infielders Gordon Beckham and Jayson Nix, as well as Detroit Tigers starting pitcher Rick Porcello.

On April 13, 2010, Romero set a new career high with 12 strikeouts while allowing only two runs on one hit over eight innings in a 4–2 victory over the Chicago White Sox. On May 15, Romero pitched his first complete game and shutout while tying a career-high 12 strikeouts in a 6–0 victory over the Texas Rangers.

==== 2011 ====
On June 26, 2011, Romero got his first major league hit, a two RBI single to right field, while pitching a complete-game shutout against the St. Louis Cardinals to complete the sweep. The five runs scored by the Jays were a welcome change for Romero, who had received two or fewer runs of support in each of his previous eight starts.

On July 10, 2011, Romero was named as a late reserve to the American League All-Star Team, just two days before the game. He replaced injured Boston Red Sox pitcher Jon Lester, who was replacing Seattle Mariners pitcher Félix Hernández, who, because of starting the last game before the All-Star break, was ineligible to play in the game.

Romero was named the AL Player of the Week for the week of August 1–7, 2011. Romero set personal highs for a single season with his second shutout and fourth complete game on August 18 against the Oakland Athletics. On September 6, Romero was named the pitcher of the month for August, after posting a record of 5–0 in 6 starts. He led the American League in ERA (2.05) and opponents batted .160 against him, a major league low for the month.

==== 2012 ====
Romero was named the opening day starter for the Blue Jays against the Cleveland Indians on April 5, 2012.

On April 11, 2012, in the fourth inning of a game against the Boston Red Sox, Romero recorded his 500th career strikeout against outfielder Darnell McDonald. He made his 100th career start on May 8, 2012 against the Oakland Athletics, receiving a no-decision.

Romero's season started out well, and as of June 22, Romero was 8–1 – albeit with an ERA of 4.34, nearly a run and a half higher than his previous season's ERA of 2.90. The rest of the season, however, was little short of disastrous, as in Romero's last 17 appearances (all starts) he went 1–13 with an ERA of 7.35. No physical reason appeared to exist for Romero's sudden turn in performance, and the Jays kept him in the rotation for the entire season. Overall, Romero finished the 2012 season with a 9–14 record along with an MLB-high 5.77 ERA and 105 walks issued.

Romero later revealed that he pitched through pain in his knees all season because he did not want to hurt the already uncompetitive team by being sidelined.

==== 2013 ====
Romero had been the starter for the previous two opening days for the Blue Jays, but in light of his second-half struggles in 2012, on February 5, 2013, manager John Gibbons said Romero would be the Jays' number 5 starter for the 2013 season. Despite Gibbons' statements about Romero's position in the starting rotation, however, on March 26, 2013, the Blue Jays optioned Romero to the Class-A Advanced Dunedin Blue Jays.

Romero claims to have begun the year with pain in his left side which forced him to compensate in his delivery by putting more pressure on his legs, which were already in pain and had been since the previous season. None of this was revealed to Jays management or the public at the time.

Romero spent time in an extended spring training camp, and was recalled from Dunedin on May 3, 2013, after having pitched only one official game in minor league play. However, back at the major league level, Romero posted an 0–2 record with a 12.46 ERA in two starts. He was subsequently optioned to the Triple-A Buffalo Bisons on May 9, 2013. Romero was then outrighted from the 40-man roster on June 1, 2013 to make room for Ramon Ortiz.

Romero spent the next several months as a Bison, compiling a 5–8 record with a 5.78 ERA over the course of 22 starts. His contract was selected by the Blue Jays on September 3 after the Bisons season ended, and the major league rosters expanded. He appeared in two games in relief for Toronto in September, giving up 3 runs in three innings. Romero's overall major league record for the 2013 season was 0–2, with an 11.05 ERA in 7 1/3 innings. Though he would try for several years afterward to restart his pitching career, 2013 was his final season in the majors. Romero never again appeared on a big league roster, nor would he ever again register a win at any level of organized baseball.

==== 2014 ====
Romero was invited to the Blue Jays spring training camp, where he walked 10 batters over 9 2/3 innings. He was sent to minor league camp on March 19, 2014. In June, he underwent season-ending knee surgery and could require a second surgery on his other knee. Up to the surgery, he had posted an 0–3 record with a 5.50 ERA and 42 walks through 37 2/3 innings pitching for the Buffalo Bisons. Romero had been pitching with torn quadriceps tendons in both legs.

=== San Francisco Giants ===
Romero began the 2015 season on the disabled list of the Double-A New Hampshire Fisher Cats. He was released by the Blue Jays organization on April 26. On May 9, Romero signed a minor league contract with the San Francisco Giants. In four starts in the Arizona Rookie league, Romero had a 0–2 record, 5.62 ERA, seven walks, and four strikeouts in eight innings. He elected free agency on November 6.

Romero re-signed a minor league contract with the Giants on November 16, 2015. He once again pitched only eight innings for the entire season, making two starts for the Giants' Triple-A Sacramento affiliate, with no decision in either start. After the 2016 season, the Giants re-signed Romero to a minor league deal. Romero was released by the Giants organization on April 29, 2017, after making four starts with Sacramento, compiling an 0-2 record.

=== Toros de Tijuana ===
On May 30, 2017, Romero signed with the Toros de Tijuana of the Mexican League. He appeared in 12 games for the Toros, all in relief, and posted a 5.40 ERA in 15 innings without recording a win, a loss or a save. In early August, Romero was placed on the Toros reserve list, rendering him inactive as a player, while still keeping his contractual rights tied to the team.

Romero did not play for any team after August 2017. On December 31, 2018, Romero officially announced on Instagram that he would be retiring from professional baseball.

== Pitching style ==
Romero threw an 87–92 miles per hour two-seam fastball, a 92–95 miles per hour four-seam fastball, an 82–87 miles per hour changeup, a curveball that ranged from 74–78 miles per hour, and lastly an 84–86 miles per hour slider.

== Personal life ==
Romero is of Mexican descent, and has a younger brother, Gabriel, who was drafted by the Blue Jays in the 47th round of the 2010 amateur draft, as a right-handed pitcher. He also has two sisters. He is married to retired Canadian soccer player Kara Lang, and they have 2 sons and a daughter.

Sporting positions
Preceded by Shaun Marcum	Opening Day starting pitcher for the Toronto Blue Jays; 2011—2012	Succeeded by R. A. Dickey
