= J. A. Happ =

American baseball player (born 1982)

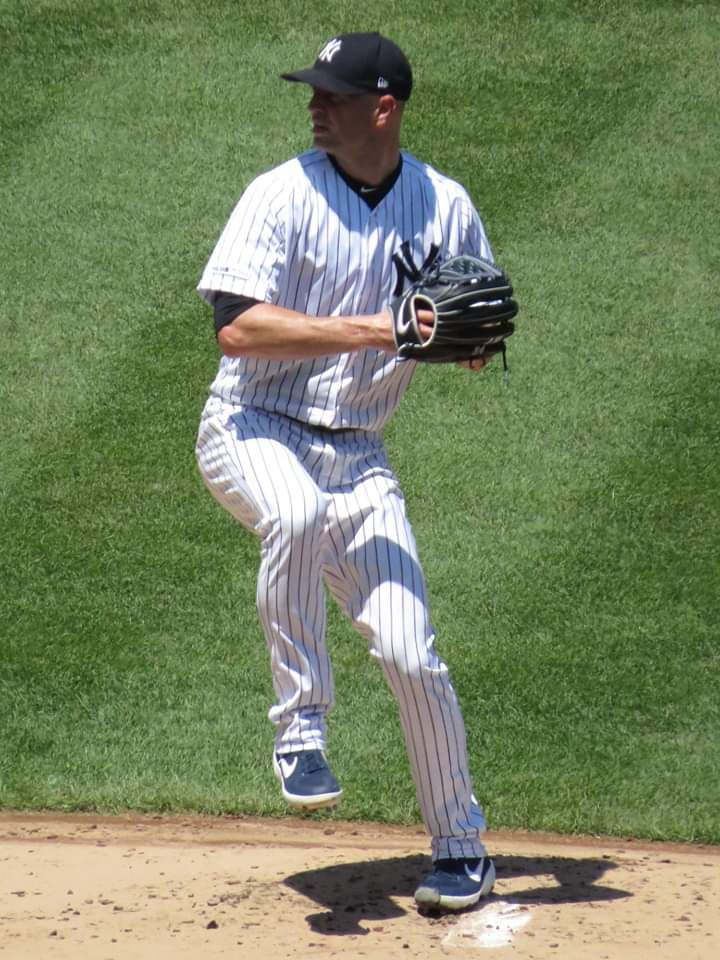
- Happ with the New York Yankees in 2019
- Pitcher
- Born: October 19, 1982 (age 44); Peru, Illinois, U.S.
- Batted: Left Threw: Left

MLB debut
- June 30, 2007, for the Philadelphia Phillies

Last MLB appearance
- September 30, 2021, for the St. Louis Cardinals

MLB statistics
- Win–loss record: 133–100
- Earned run average: 4.13
- Strikeouts: 1,661
- Stats at Baseball Reference

Teams
- Philadelphia Phillies (2007–2010); Houston Astros (2010–2012); Toronto Blue Jays (2012–2014); Seattle Mariners (2015); Pittsburgh Pirates (2015); Toronto Blue Jays (2016–2018); New York Yankees (2018–2020); Minnesota Twins (2021); St. Louis Cardinals (2021)

Career highlights and awards
- All-Star (2018); World Series champion (2008)
Medals
Men's baseball
Representing United States
World Baseball Classic
| Gold medal – first place | 2017 Los Angeles | Team |

James Anthony Happ (born October 19, 1982) is an American former professional baseball pitcher who played 15 seasons in Major League Baseball (MLB). He won the World Series as a member of the Philadelphia Phillies, and was an All-Star as a member of the Toronto Blue Jays.

== Early life and amateur career ==
Happ was born in Peru, Illinois, and raised with two older sisters. Though his name is James Anthony and his initials are "J. A.", he pronounces his name as "Jay." He attended high school at St. Bede Academy, where he was a four-year letter winner in baseball and basketball. He was named Bureau County Athlete of the Year during his senior season.

After graduating from high school in 2001, Happ enrolled at Northwestern University, where he majored in history and played college baseball for the Northwestern Wildcats. He was named to the All-Big Ten Conference First Team in his freshman, sophomore, and junior seasons, during which he compiled a 16–11 win–loss record, an earned run average (ERA) of 2.88, and 251 strikeouts to 90 walks over 228 1/3 innings pitched. In 2003, he played collegiate summer baseball with the Harwich Mariners of the Cape Cod Baseball League.

== Professional career ==
=== Philadelphia Phillies ===
==== Minor leagues ====
The Philadelphia Phillies selected Happ in the third round, with the 92nd overall selection, of the 2004 Major League Baseball draft. Happ chose to forgo his senior season and signed with the Phillies. Immediately after agreeing to terms on June 16, 2004, Happ was assigned to the Batavia Muckdogs of the Short-season A-level New York–Penn League, where he posted a 2.02 ERA in eleven starts, averaging more than one strikeout per inning pitched. Happ again impressed in 2005 with the low-A Lakewood BlueClaws. While Happ played for only half of the season, he compiled a 2.36 ERA in 72 1/3 innings. He was promoted to Double-A for a single game at the end of the season, in which he gave up only one earned run in six innings and struck out eight.

In 2006, Happ began the season for the Clearwater Threshers of the High-A Florida State League, but earned a promotion to the Double-A Reading Phillies at midseason. He also pitched one game at the end of the season for the Scranton/Wilkes-Barre Red Barons, then the Phillies' Triple-A affiliate. Combined for the year, Happ went 10–9, with an ERA of 2.69, 162 strikeouts, and 49 walks in 160 2/3 innings. He was rewarded, during the following offseason, with his first appearance in Baseball America's "Top Ten Prospects" list for the Phillies organization, in which he was ranked eighth. (Prior to this, Happ had rarely been identified as a prospect despite his impressive performances in 2004 and 2005 due to his average pitch velocity.)

After pitching in the Arizona Fall League in the fall of 2006, Happ moved with the Red Barons to Ottawa when they became the Ottawa Lynx for the 2007 season.

==== Major league debut and return to Triple-A ====
On June 30, 2007, while suffering from a spate of injuries to their starting rotation, the Phillies purchased Happ's contract from the Lynx. At the time, Happ's record in Triple-A was 1–2 with a 4.02 ERA. He made his major league debut against the New York Mets and allowed five runs, all earned, in four innings. He was then returned to the Lynx and did not pitch at the major league level again that season, thus ending the year with an 11.25 major league ERA.

Happ struggled upon his return to Ottawa. Despite striking out 36 batters over five starts in the months of July and August, Happ's ERA ballooned to 5.02 by the end of the season. It was later revealed that he had been pitching that season with elbow fatigue. As a result, he did not participate in any fall or winter leagues during the following offseason.

==== 2008 ====
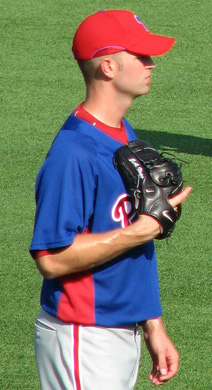
Happ with the Philadelphia Phillies in July 2008

Happ began the 2008 season with the Phillies' new Triple-A affiliate in Allentown, Pennsylvania, the Lehigh Valley IronPigs. He went 5–6 with a 3.54 ERA in his first seventeen starts, striking out 104 batters in 101 2/3 innings.

On July 4, Happ was called up to take the place of Brett Myers in the Phillies' starting rotation, after the struggling Myers went to the minors in an effort to regain his form. That same night, Happ made his season debut against Johan Santana and the Mets. He fared better in his second major league start, pitching 4 2/3 innings, giving up three hits, two earned runs, four walks while striking out three. He earned a no-decision as the Phillies went on to win the game, 3–2. Happ was also awarded a no-decision in his third career start (second of the season), in which he pitched 6 1/3 innings and gave up two runs, but the Phillies went on to defeat the Cardinals by a 4–2 score. He was then optioned back to Lehigh Valley, as the Phillies would not need a fifth starter for two weeks. Myers regained his place in the rotation on July 23.

Happ was recalled to the major leagues on July 29 when the struggling Adam Eaton was demoted to Lakewood. However, Happ never took Eaton's spot in the rotation, as the Phillies had already acquired starter Joe Blanton from the Oakland Athletics on July 17. Happ instead pitched out of the bullpen, appearing in two games (in which he struggled), and was then sent to Triple-A once again. He ended the Triple-A season at 8–7, with a 3.60 ERA. He was second among International League pitchers with 151 strikeouts in 135 innings.

Happ joined the Phillies for the third time in 2008 on September 1 when the rosters expanded. On September 16, Phillies manager Charlie Manuel announced that Happ would start on the following night against the Atlanta Braves, replacing the struggling Kyle Kendrick. Happ pitched six shutout innings in the game, earning his first major league win in a 6–1 Phillies victory. Happ was named to the postseason roster, and pitched in one game in the National League Championship Series. In total, Happ posted a 1–0 record in 2008, with an ERA of 3.69 and 26 strikeouts over 31 2/3 innings. He received a World Series ring after the Phillies defeated the Tampa Bay Rays, for their second championship.

==== 2009 ====
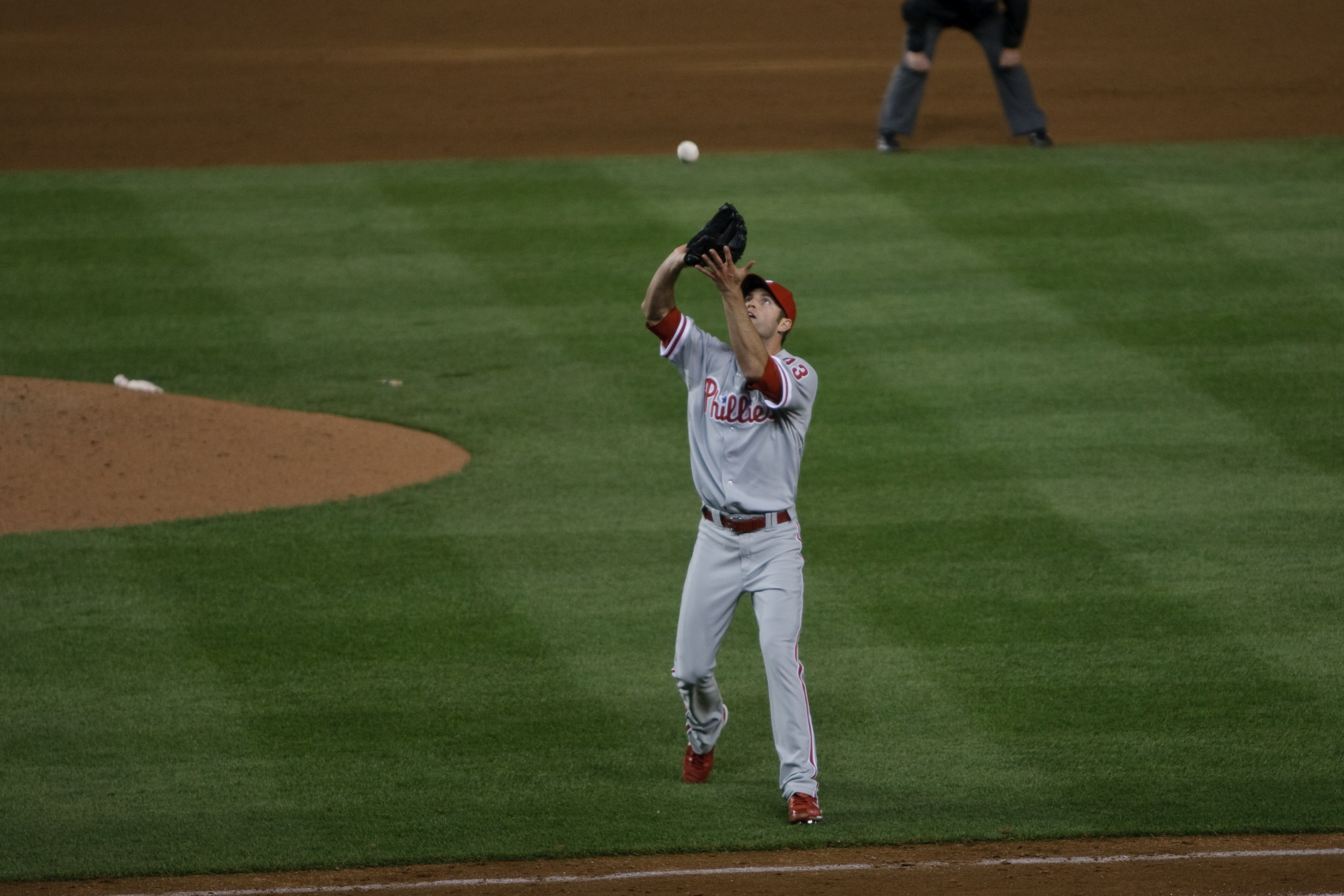
Happ fielding a pop-up on April 16, 2009

Happ became a member of the starting rotation after fifth starter Chan Ho Park struggled in his starts and was sent to the bullpen. Happ threw his first career complete game and shutout against the Toronto Blue Jays on June 27, 2009. He got his first major league hit on July 2, against the Atlanta Braves. It came during the fifth inning with two outs and no one on base. On August 5, Happ pitched his second career shutout, giving up four hits and striking out ten in a home game against the Colorado Rockies. In that game, he also collected his first career extra-base hit, an eighth-inning double off Rockies pitcher Josh Fogg. He became the first rookie pitcher to 10 wins on August 22 against the New York Mets. He made his first career postseason start against the Rockies on October 11, 2009.

On October 20, 2009, Happ was named Sporting News NL Rookie of the Year. He was also named by his fellow players as Players Choice Awards NL Outstanding Rookie. Baseball fans voted him the MLB "This Year in Baseball Awards" Rookie of the Year (in both leagues). He came in second in balloting for MLB's Jackie Robinson Rookie of the Year Award (in the NL). He was also selected as the left-handed pitcher on the Topps MLB All-Star Rookie team. Baseball America chose him as one of the five pitchers on its All-Rookie Team. The Philadelphia chapter of the Baseball Writers' Association of America presented him the "Steve Carlton Most Valuable Pitcher" award. In 2009, Happ posted a 12–4 record, 2.93 ERA, 119 strikeouts, and a 1.24 WHIP.

With the Phillies in 2010, Happ made three starts totaling 15 1/3 innings and earned a 1–0 record, 1.76 ERA, nine strikeouts, and a 1.63 WHIP.

=== Houston Astros ===
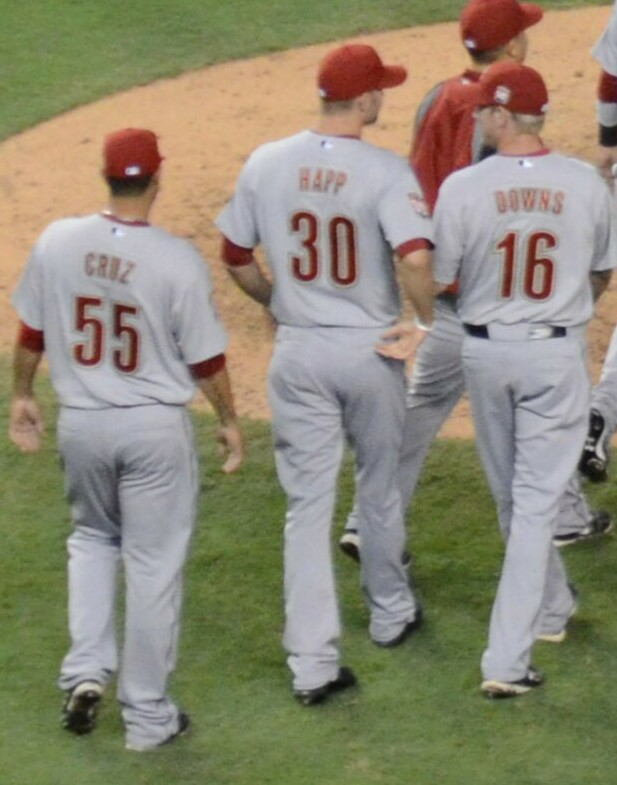
Happ (center) with the Houston Astros in 2012

On July 29, 2010, Happ was traded to the Houston Astros along with minor leaguers Anthony Gose and Jonathan Villar in exchange for Roy Oswalt. He would make 13 starts with Houston in 2010, going 5–4 with a 3.75 ERA, 61 strikeouts, and a 1.32 WHIP in 72 innings. The following season, Happ would post his worst career numbers, with a 6–15 record, a 5.35 ERA, 134 strikeouts, and a 1.54 WHIP in a career-high 156 1/3 innings pitched.

On June 13, 2012, Happ was the opposing starting pitcher for Matt Cain's perfect game. Happ pitched 3 1/3 innings, gave up 11 hits, and 8 runs, all of which were earned runs. With Houston in 2012, he posted a 7–9 record with a 4.83 ERA, 98 strikeouts, and a 1.45 WHIP in 104 1/3 innings.

=== Toronto Blue Jays ===
Happ was traded to the Toronto Blue Jays on July 20, 2012, along with Brandon Lyon, and David Carpenter, for Francisco Cordero, Ben Francisco, Asher Wojciechowski, David Rollins, Joe Musgrove, Carlos Pérez, and Kevin Comer. Happ worked as a reliever for the Blue Jays until the demotion of Brett Cecil allowed him to be promoted to the vacant starting role. On September 7, the Jays announced that Happ would undergo surgery on a fractured right foot and miss the rest of the season. Happ made 10 appearances (6 starts) with the Blue Jays in 2012, and finished with a 3–2 record and a 4.46 ERA. On January 18, 2013, it was announced that Happ avoided arbitration, agreeing to a one-year, $3.7 million contract with Toronto.

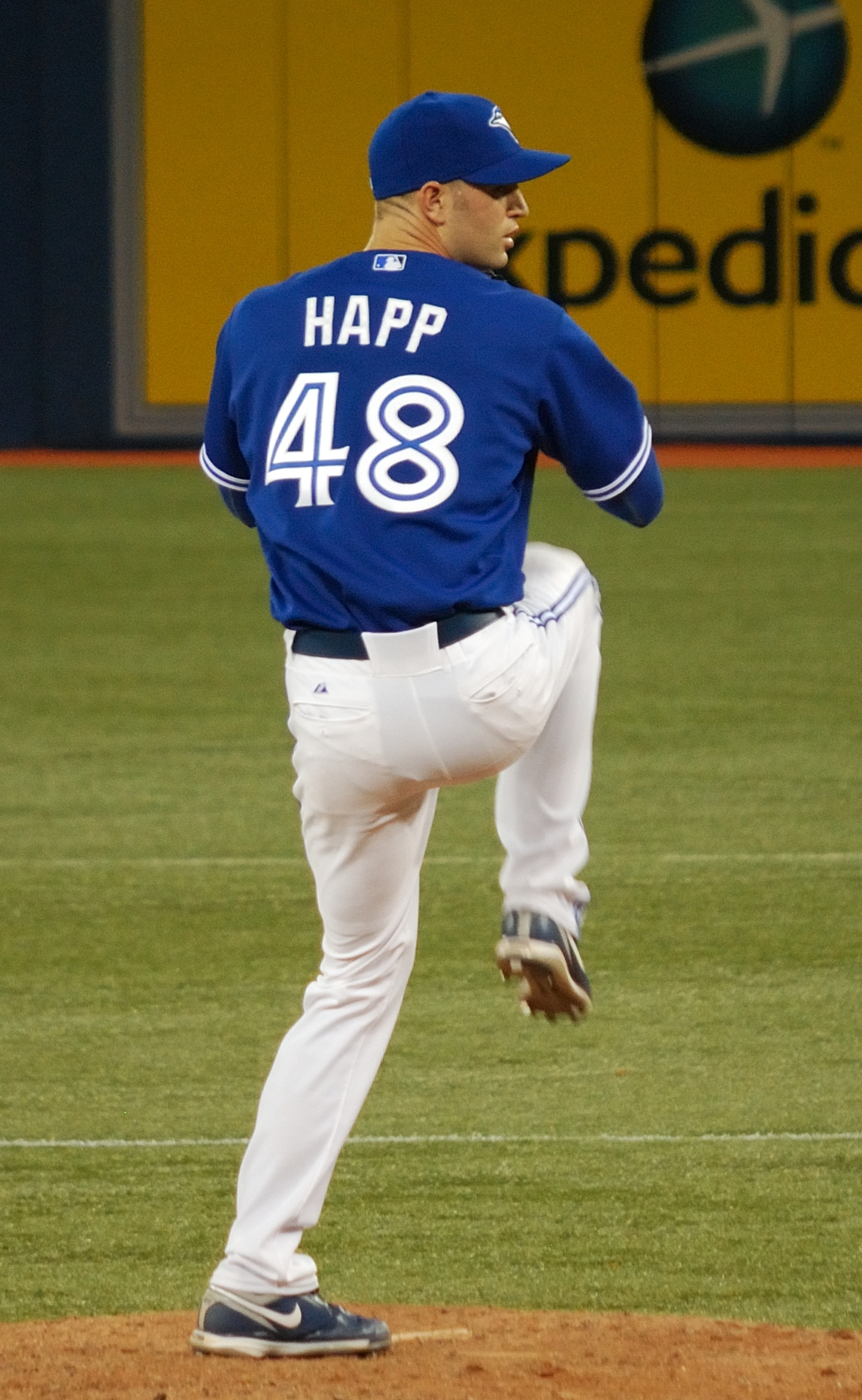
Happ in July 2012

On May 7, 2013, in a game against the Tampa Bay Rays, Happ was hit in the head by a line drive hit by Desmond Jennings. He collapsed immediately, but remained conscious and after lying on the mound for 11 minutes, he was taken off the field on a stretcher and taken to Bayfront Medical Center. The nursing supervisor told the Associated Press that Happ had been admitted to the hospital and was in stable condition. Happ remained in hospital overnight, and was released the next morning with a head contusion and a laceration to his left ear. Happ was placed on the 15-day disabled list after being released from the hospital. He was then transferred to the 60-day disabled list on May 24 to make room for Sean Nolin. Happ was activated from the disabled list on August 5, and retook his role in the starting rotation. After making his start on August 12, Happ was placed on the bereavement list due to the death of his grandfather. In his first start at Tropicana Field since he was struck by a line drive, Happ recorded the win, pitching 5 1/3 innings and giving up 2 earned runs on 5 hits with 5 strikeouts. In total in 2013, Happ made 18 starts totaling 92 2/3 innings, and posted a record of 5–7, a 4.56 ERA, 77 strikeouts, and a 1.45 WHIP.

On March 26, 2014, Happ was placed on the disabled list. He began the season pitching out of the bullpen. When Dustin McGowan was removed from the rotation, Happ was given the 5th starter spot and made his first start of the season on May 5. On August 7, he set a career-high for strikeouts, with 12, in a 2–1 loss to the Baltimore Orioles. Happ earned his 50th career win on September 22, when the Blue Jays defeated the Seattle Mariners 14–4. He pitched 7 innings and yielded 2 earned runs, while also earning his 700th strikeout. He made his final start of the 2014 season on September 27, against the Baltimore Orioles. Taking the win, 4–2, Happ leveled his record for the season at 11–11, and finished with a 4.22 ERA, 133 strikeouts, and a 1.34 WHIP in 30 appearances (26 starts) totaling 158 innings pitched. On November 1, the Blue Jays picked up Happ's $6.7 million option for the 2015 season.

=== Seattle Mariners ===
On December 3, 2014, Happ was traded to the Seattle Mariners for outfielder Michael Saunders. Happ made 20 starts and one relief appearance for the Mariners in 2015, compiling a 4–6 record with a 4.64 ERA and 82 strikeouts.

=== Pittsburgh Pirates ===
On July 31, 2015, Happ was traded to the Pittsburgh Pirates for Adrian Sampson. In 11 starts for Pittsburgh, Happ posted a 7–2 record, 1.85 ERA, and 69 strikeouts.

=== Toronto Blue Jays (second stint) ===
On November 27, 2015, Happ signed a three-year, $36 million contract with the Blue Jays. He became the Blue Jays' first pitcher to earn eleven wins prior to the All-Star break since Roy Halladay in 2008, when he defeated the Cleveland Indians 17–1 on July 3, 2016. In his next start, Happ recorded his 12th victory of the 2016 season, 6–0 over the Detroit Tigers, which tied his career-high and matched the twelve wins Halladay posted before the All-Star break in 2006. On July 24, Happ earned his 13th win of the season, defeating the Seattle Mariners 2–0 and establishing a new single-season high in wins. Happ tied Stephen Strasburg for the MLB lead in wins on August 4, and took the outright lead with his 16th victory of the season on August 10. Happ earned his 20th win of the 2016 season on September 20, defeating Seattle 10–2. In doing so, he joined Halladay, Roger Clemens, Pat Hentgen, David Wells, and Jack Morris as the only pitchers to win 20 games or more for the Blue Jays in a single season. Happ finished the 2016 season with a 20–4 record, 3.18 ERA, and 163 strikeouts in 195 innings. Happ started Game 2 of the American League Division Series (ALDS) and earned the win, pitching five innings and allowing a single run on nine hits with five strikeouts. The win gave the Blue Jays a 2–0 series lead over the Texas Rangers. Happ finished sixth in voting for the 2016 American League Cy Young Award, receiving three third-place votes, two fourth-place votes, and one fifth-place vote.

On April 18, 2017, Happ was placed on the 10-day disabled list due to left elbow inflammation. He had suffered the injury during a start against the Baltimore Orioles two days earlier. Happ ended up missing six weeks of the 2017 season.

On March 20, 2018, Happ was announced by Blue Jays manager John Gibbons as the Opening Day starter, a first for his career. The Blue Jays lost the game 6–1 to the New York Yankees.

Happ was named to the 2018 MLB All-Star Game. He played the tenth inning of the game and earned the save for the American League.

=== New York Yankees ===
On July 26, 2018, the Blue Jays traded Happ to the New York Yankees in exchange for Brandon Drury and Billy McKinney. On August 2, Happ was placed on the 10-day disabled list due to hand, foot, and mouth disease. Happ was activated on August 9 and remained in the Yankees rotation for the remainder of the season. Happ had a very strong end of the season with the Yankees, going 7–0 with a 2.69 ERA. Between the two teams, in 2018 he was 17–6 with a 3.65 ERA. He led all major league pitchers in fastball percentage (73.4%) and grand slams given up, with four.

On December 17, 2018, the Yankees re-signed Happ to a two-year, $34 million contract through the 2020 season with a vesting option for 2021.

Despite a shaky 2019, he finished strong with ERA under 2.00 for the month of September. On October 4, Happ made his first appearance as a reliever for the Yankees, pitching in the eighth inning against the Minnesota Twins in ALDS. He was initially slated to be a long reliever because CC Sabathia was not included in the 25-man roster for that round. Happ surrendered a walk-off home run in Game 2 of the American League Championship Series to Carlos Correa.

On February 22, 2020, Happ returned as a starter for the Yankees Spring Training Opener against Toronto Blue Jays, and he had his uniform number switched to no. 33 after Greg Bird was released from the team. In nine games, Happ was 2–2 with a 3.47 ERA.

On October 29, the Yankees declined their $17 million vesting option on Happ, making him a free agent.

=== Minnesota Twins ===
On January 23, 2021, Happ signed a one-year, $8 million contract with the Minnesota Twins.

=== St. Louis Cardinals ===
On July 30, 2021, Happ was traded to the St. Louis Cardinals with cash in exchange for John Gant and Evan Sisk. Happ became a free agent at the end of the season, and announced his retirement on May 26, 2022. Happ earned $97.3 million during his career and accrued 21 Wins Above Replacement, according to Baseball Reference.

== Pitching style ==
Happ threw five pitches: a four-seam fastball (89–95 mph), a two-seam fastball (89–93), a slider/cutter (83–86), a curveball (76–79), and a changeup (82–84). Happ relied on all of his pitches against right-handed hitters, but did not use the changeup against left-handers. He commonly mixed his curveball with his fastball in two-strike counts.

== Personal life ==
Happ's cousin is former Wisconsin Badgers basketball player Ethan Happ.

Happ married in November 2014. Together, they have a son and daughter. They reside in Clearwater, Florida.

Awards and achievements
| Preceded by Geovany Soto | Sporting News NL Rookie of the Year; 2009 | Succeeded by Jason Heyward |
| Preceded by Marco Estrada | Opening Day starting pitcher for the Toronto Blue Jays; 2018 | Succeeded by Marcus Stroman |
