= Marco Estrada (baseball) =

Mexican baseball player (born 1983)

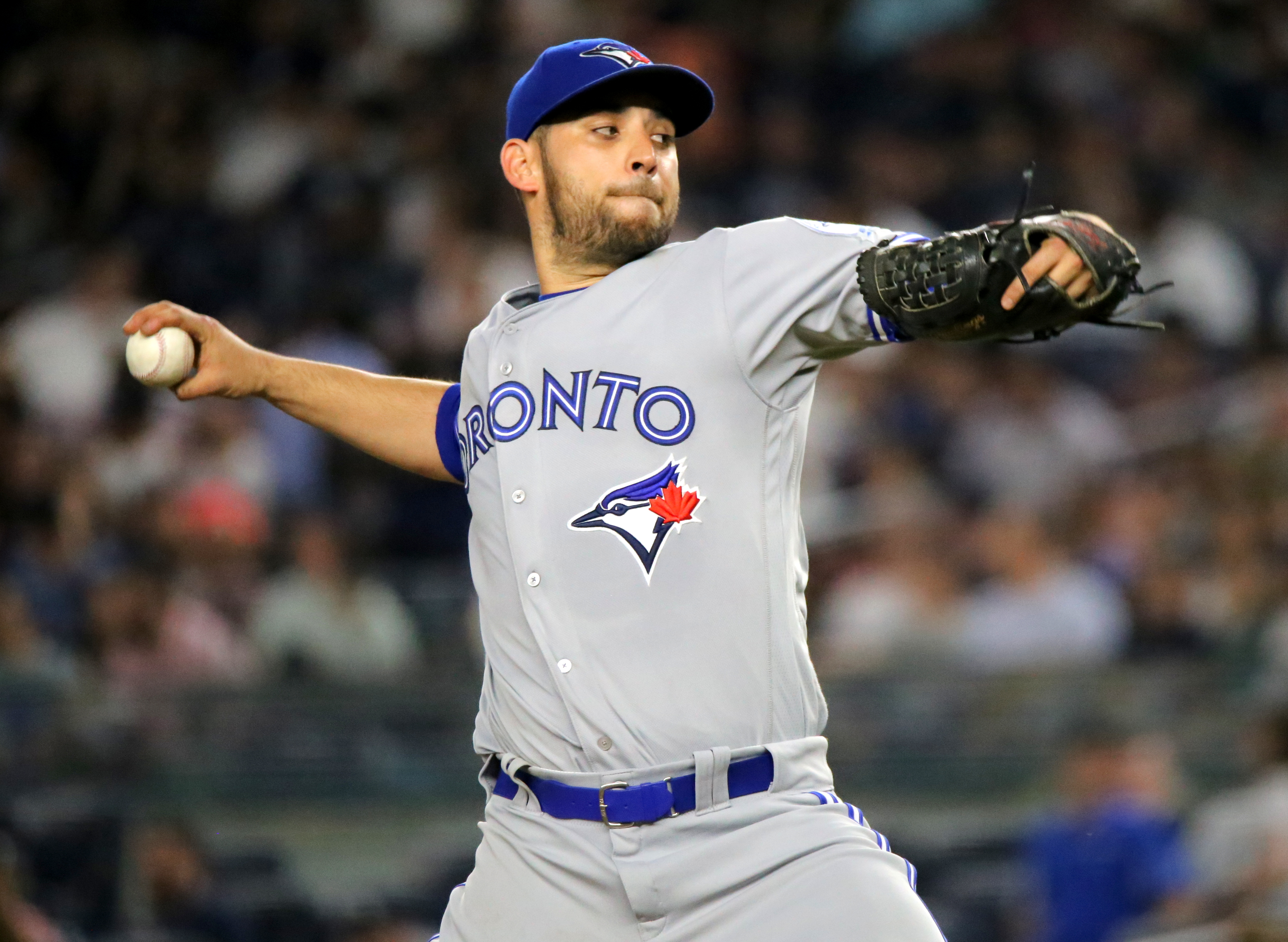
- Estrada with the Toronto Blue Jays in 2016
- Pitcher
- Born: July 5, 1983 (age 43); Ciudad Obregón, Sonora, Mexico
- Batted: Right Threw: Right

MLB debut
- August 20, 2008, for the Washington Nationals

Last MLB appearance
- April 16, 2019, for the Oakland Athletics

MLB statistics
- Win–loss record: 62–68
- Earned run average: 4.29
- Strikeouts: 1,094
- Stats at Baseball Reference

Teams
- Washington Nationals (2008–2009); Milwaukee Brewers (2010–2014); Toronto Blue Jays (2015–2018); Oakland Athletics (2019)

Career highlights and awards
- All-Star (2016)

Marco René Estrada (born July 5, 1983) is a Mexican-American former professional baseball pitcher. He played in Major League Baseball (MLB) for the Washington Nationals, Milwaukee Brewers, Toronto Blue Jays, and Oakland Athletics. He was an All-Star in 2016.

== Early life ==
Estrada graduated from Sylmar High School in Sylmar, California, and then attended Glendale Community College and Long Beach State University. In 2005 with Long Beach State, Estrada pitched to an 8–3 win-loss record and 2.43 earned run average (ERA) in 18 appearances (17 starts). He was selected by the Washington Nationals in the sixth round of the 2005 Major League Baseball draft.

== Professional career ==
=== Washington Nationals ===
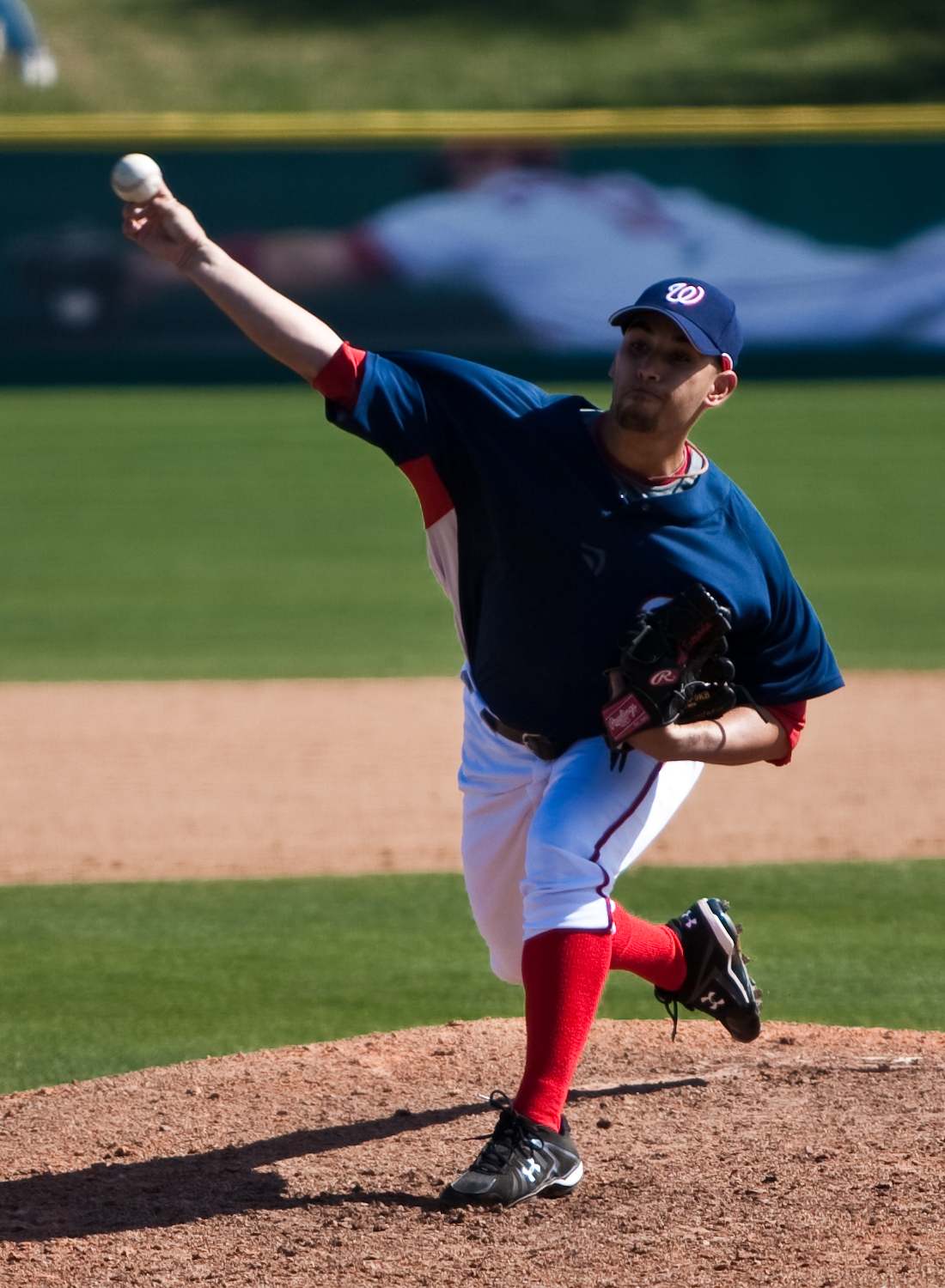
Estrada with the Nationals during spring training, 2009.

After being drafted by Washington, Estrada began his minor league career pitching for the Vermont Expos in the short-season New York–Penn League. In three starts and six relief appearances, he pitched 33 2/3 innings, compiling a win–loss record of 1–3 and an ERA of 5.08. During that time, he struck out 37 batters while issuing 16 walks.

Estrada spent the 2006 season with the Rookie-level Gulf Coast League Nationals, and the Savannah Sand Gnats of the Single-A South Atlantic League. He posted a record of 3 wins and 4 losses and a 3.98 ERA over 61 innings, consisting of 12 starts and 1 appearance in relief, striking out a total of 56 batters and walking 20.

In 2007, Estrada pitched for the GCL Nationals, the Single-A Hagerstown Suns of the South Atlantic League, and the High-A Potomac Nationals of the Carolina League. He logged 105 2/3 innings in 23 starts, winning 6, losing 8, and recording a 4.85 ERA with 102 strikeouts and 37 walks.

Estrada began the 2008 season with the Harrisburg Senators of the Double-A Eastern League, where he pitched 74 1/3 innings in 13 starts, posting an ERA of 2.66, striking out 67 batters and walking 32. In June, he was promoted to the Syracuse Chiefs of the Triple-A International League. Estrada was called up to the major leagues on August 19 and made his debut the next day. He made 11 appearances as a reliever that season. Estrada pitched in four games (including one start) for the Nationals in 2009, but played the majority of the season with Syracuse. Estrada was designated for assignment on January 28, 2010.

=== Milwaukee Brewers ===
On February 3, 2010, Estrada was claimed off waivers by the Milwaukee Brewers. He began the season with the Triple-A Pacific Coast League's Nashville Sounds. He was recalled to the big league club and made his Brewers debut on May 18, entering the game against the Cincinnati Reds as a relief pitcher in the 5th inning. He recorded nine consecutive outs through three innings before giving up a solo home run to Joey Votto in the bottom of the 8th. He also made his first official at-bat in that game, grounding out in the 6th. He was outrighted to Nashville after the season.

On April 6, 2011, Estrada was again called up to the majors, taking the injured Zack Greinke's spot in the starting rotation. Estrada became the long reliever and the backup starter for the Brewers pitching rotation.

2011 was Estrada's first successful season in the major leagues. Between being the long reliever and backup starter (starting in a total of seven games), Estrada pitched in 92.2 innings, posted a 4.08 ERA, and struck out 88 batters for an impressive 8.5 K/9. It was by far Estrada's most productive stint in the majors. From 2008 to 2010, Estrada only pitched in a total of 31.1 innings, and never posted an ERA below 6.00.

Estrada spent almost the entire 2012 season in the starting rotation after a season-ending injury to Chris Narveson and an injury and eventual release of Randy Wolf. As a result, Estrada had the best season of his career, posting a 5–7 record, a 3.64 ERA in 138.1 innings to go along with 143 strikeouts. On January 18, 2013, the Brewers announced they had avoided arbitration with Estrada, signing him to a one-year contract worth $1.955 million.

After spending three seasons as a long reliever and alternative starter, Estrada was named to the Brewers starting rotation for the 2013 season. He posted a 7–4 record in 2013, with a 3.87 ERA and 118 strikeouts in 21 starts. In 2014, Estrada made 39 appearances for the Brewers, including 18 starts. He pitched to a 7–6 record, 4.36 ERA, and 127 strikeouts in 150 2/3 innings pitched.

=== Toronto Blue Jays ===
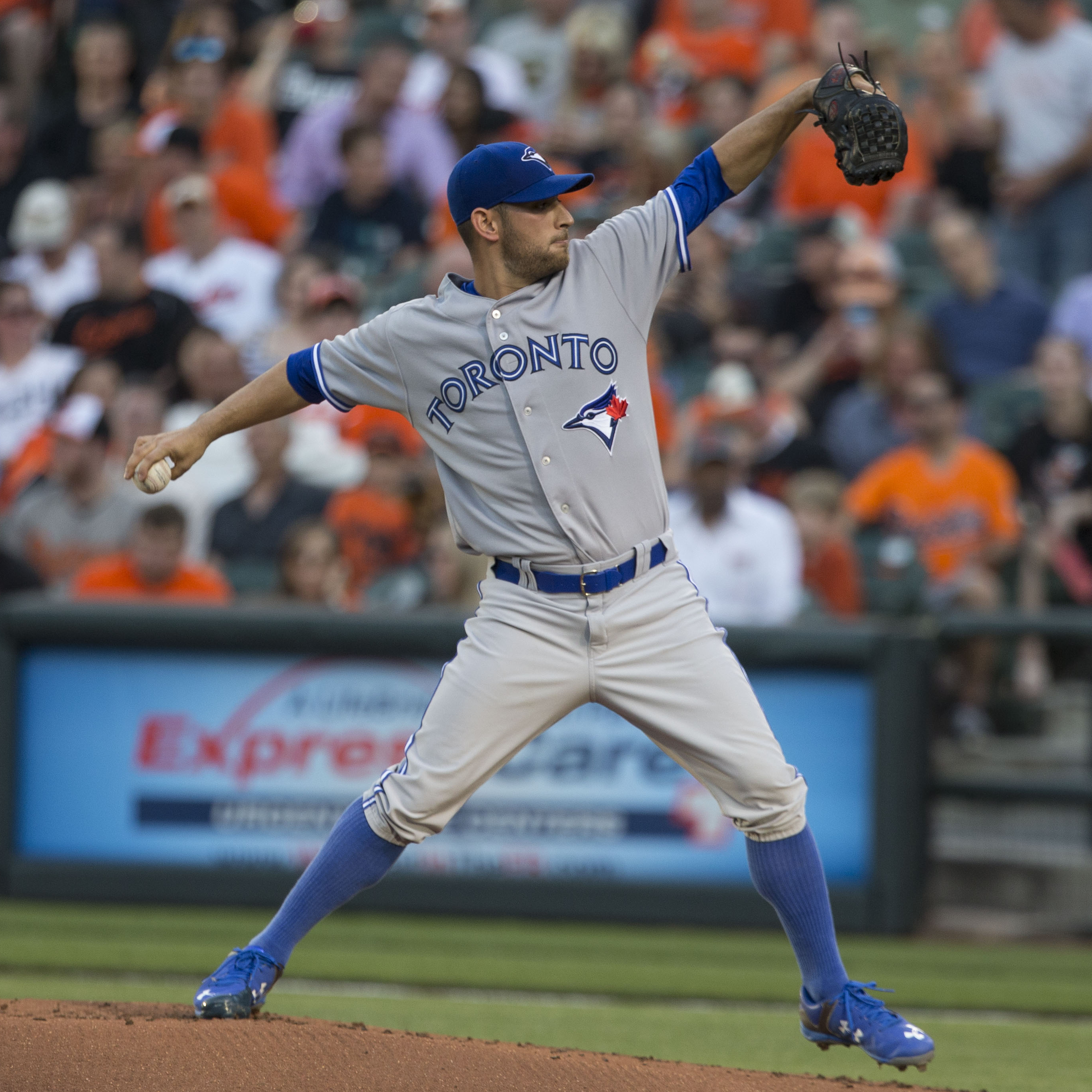
Estrada in May 2015

On November 1, 2014, Estrada was traded to the Toronto Blue Jays for Adam Lind. He and the Blue Jays avoided salary arbitration when he agreed to a one-year, $3.9 million contract on January 16, 2015. Estrada opened spring training in competition for the fifth starter role with Aaron Sanchez. He began the 2015 regular season in the bullpen, but was moved into the starting rotation after the Blue Jays optioned Daniel Norris to the Triple-A Buffalo Bisons on May 1. On June 19, he took a no-hitter into the 8th inning against the Baltimore Orioles, which was broken up by a bloop single from Jimmy Paredes. In his next start, he took a perfect game into the 8th, which ended when Logan Forsythe hit a weak infield single. Estrada became the first player to lose no-hit bids in the 8th inning or later in consecutive games since Dave Stieb did so in 1988. Estrada continued his strong play to the end of the season, and had the best season of his career, finishing with a 13–8 record, 3.13 ERA, and 131 strikeouts in a career-high 181 innings pitched. He led the major leagues in holding opposing batters to the lowest batting average on balls in play (.216).

On October 11, Estrada made his first career postseason start, and held the Texas Rangers to 1 run over 6 1/3, earning the win as the Blue Jays avoided elimination. He started game 1 of the 2015 American League Championship Series, taking the loss as the Blue Jays were shut out by the Kansas City Royals, 5–0. Down 3–1 in the series, Estrada started game 5 for Toronto on Oct. 21 and held Kansas City to 1 run over 7 2/3, avoiding elimination for the second time in the 2015 postseason with a 7–1 victory. He faced the minimum number of hitters through 6 2/3, the longest such streak for an American League starting pitcher in a postseason game since Don Larsen's perfect game in 1956.

Estrada received a $15.8 million qualifying offer from the Blue Jays on November 6, and later agreed to a two-year, $26 million contract on November 13, 2015. On November 18, Estrada finished in 10th place in the American League Cy Young Award voting, receiving one 4th place vote and one 5th place vote. On December 17, the Toronto chapter of the Baseball Writers' Association of America voted Estrada the Blue Jays' Pitcher of the Year.

Estrada opened the 2016 regular season on the disabled list with a back injury. He made his season debut on April 10, and pitched seven shutout innings against the Boston Red Sox, leading the Blue Jays to a 3–0 victory in his 100th career start. In a 7–2 victory against the Philadelphia Phillies on June 15, Estrada set a Blue Jays franchise record by allowing 5 or fewer hits in 10 consecutive starts. On June 21, he set an MLB record by having eleven straight starts pitching six innings and allowing five hits or fewer. Estrada was named an All-Star for the first time in his career on July 5. In his first 10 starts after the All-Star break, Estrada would struggle to a 3–6 record and a 5.47 ERA. In his start on September 14, he became the first Blue Jay to strikeout five consecutive batters to begin a game. The following day, Jon Morosi of MLB Network tweeted Estrada had been pitching with a herniated disk in his back since the All-Star break. For the season, he was 9–9 with a 3.48 ERA, and again led the major leagues in holding opposing batters to the lowest batting average on balls in play (.234). He also led all major league pitchers in changeup percentage (28.6%). In Game 1 of the 2016 ALDS against the Texas Rangers, Estrada came within two outs of a complete-game shutout, before an Elvis Andrus triple ended his outing. He would receive the win with one earned run allowed in the 10–1 Blue Jays victory.

On March 26, 2017, Blue Jays manager John Gibbons announced Estrada would get the start on Opening Day. Estrada finished with a career-worst 4.98 ERA, despite posting career highs in innings (186) and strikeouts (176). He had the lowest ground ball percentage among major league pitchers (30.3%), and the highest fly ball percentage (50.3%).

Estrada signed a one-year, $13 million contract extension with the Blue Jays on September 20. Estrada struggled for the second year in a row, finishing with a 7–14 record in 143 2/3 innings. He became a free agent following the season.

=== Oakland Athletics ===
On January 25, 2019, Estrada signed a one-year contract with the Oakland Athletics. He was released on August 20 after compiling a 0–2 record with a 6.85 ERA and 11 strikeouts in five appearances.

== Scouting report ==
Estrada throws a four-seam fastball with an average velocity of 86–91 MPH, a curveball averaging 76–79 MPH and an 85–87 MPH cutter. His best pitch is his changeup, which he throws averaging 76–77 MPH with considerable downward movement. His 2011 season with the Brewers is considered his breakout season, due in large part to much better command of his pitches. His 2.8 BB/9 in 2011 was a vast improvement over his previous three seasons in the majors, and has been kept under 3 in each season that has followed.

== Personal life ==
Estrada and his high school sweetheart, Janai Paula, eloped in Las Vegas in 2006 had a wedding ceremony in 2008. The couple have a son and a daughter. They reside in Phoenix, Arizona.

His nickname is "Estradabien".

Sporting positions
| Preceded by Marcus Stroman | Opening Day starting pitcher for the Toronto Blue Jays; 2017 | Succeeded by J. A. Happ |
