= 2006 Minnesota Twins season =

2006 Minnesota Twins
- American League Central champions
- League: American League
- Division: Central
- Ballpark: Hubert H. Humphrey Metrodome
- City: Minneapolis
- Record: 96–66 (.593)
- Divisional place: 1st
- Owners: Carl Pohlad
- General managers: Terry Ryan
- Managers: Ron Gardenhire
- Television: WFTC; FSN North (Bert Blyleven, Dick Bremer)
- Radio: 830 WCCO AM (Herb Carneal, John Gordon, Dan Gladden, Jack Morris)

The 2006 Minnesota Twins Season was the Minnesota Twins' 46th season playing in the Twin Cities and their 106th season in the American League. They were managed by Ron Gardenhire and played their home games in the Metrodome.

The Twins finished first in the American League Central with a 96–66 record. They were swept in three games by the Oakland Athletics in the ALDS.

== Offseason ==
- January 31, 2006: Rubén Sierra was signed as a free agent by the Twins.
- March 29, 2006: Rob Bowen was selected off waivers from the Twins by the Detroit Tigers.

== Regular season ==
The Twins stumbled out of the gate after the death of Hall of Famer Kirby Puckett in late March, accumulating a dismal 25–33 record by June 7. Around that time, the team dropped underperforming veterans like Tony Batista, Juan Castro, and Kyle Lohse, replacing them with talented rookies from the Rochester Red Wings. The Twins went 9–1 in their next ten games, evening their record at 34-34. Interleague play was particularly generous to the team; the Twins had Major League Baseball's best Interleague record at 16 wins and 2 losses. By July 26 the team had won 34 of 42 games, leaving them tied with the White Sox at 59–41, but still 8.5 games behind the division-leading Tigers.

As the season neared its conclusion, the Twins continued to put distance between them and the White Sox, while gaining on the Tigers. A key series starting on September 7 saw the Twins take three out of four from the Tigers. And after a commanding win in Boston on September 19, the Twins found themselves within a half game of the Central-leading Tigers. On September 25, the Twins beat Kansas City 8–1 to secure an American League playoff berth.

A win in a 10-inning game against the Royals on September 28 moved the Twins into a tie with the Tigers atop the AL Central. With that win, the Twins broke a major league record by moving into first place after the team's 159th game. This was the latest in a season that a team moved into first place for the first time all season. (It was a tie for first at this point.)

The Tigers led the season series, so a tie at the end of the season between the Tigers and Twins would have meant the Twins get the wild card. Instead, the Tigers were swept by 100-game-losers Kansas City to end the season, and the Twins took one of three from the White Sox, giving the Twins their fourth AL Central title in five years. It was the first time in major league history that a team clinched on the last day of the season after never having held sole possession of first place.

- The representatives of the Twins in the All-Star Game were Johan Santana, Joe Mauer, and Francisco Liriano.
- The highest paid Twin in 2006 is Torii Hunter at $10,750,000.00.
- The motto for the 2006 Twins was "Smell 'em." Backup catcher Mike Redmond coined the phrase, saying the hitters have to "smell those RBIs" when they see runners in scoring position in key situations. Hitters will tap their noses when they come through. After a 9–5 victory over the Detroit Tigers on September 8 that followed a two-week-long hitting drought, hitting coach Joe Vavra remarked: "The 'smell 'ems' were out again tonight. That's the good feeling we were missing."
- In reference to the scrappy, fleet-footed hitters that make up almost half of their lineup, many of the Twins' players have been referred to by Chicago White Sox manager Ozzie Guillén as "little piranhas". The moniker has stuck, and the team has printed and markets T-shirts bearing the nickname.
- Johan Santana won his second Cy Young Award, a unanimous decision. He also won the pitching triple crown, leading the majors in wins, strikeouts, and ERA. The last pitcher to lead both leagues in all 3 categories was Dwight Gooden in 1985.
- Justin Morneau won his first AL MVP Award, a decision won narrowly over New York Yankees shortstop Derek Jeter 320 points to 306 points, with 15 of a possible 28 first place votes. He was the first Twins MVP since Rod Carew in 1977.
- Joe Mauer was the first American League catcher ever to win the Major League Baseball batting crown.

=== Season standings ===
AL Central
Team	W	L	Pct.	GB	Home	Road
Minnesota Twins	96	66	.593	—	54‍–‍27	42‍–‍39
Detroit Tigers	95	67	.586	1	46‍–‍35	49‍–‍32
Chicago White Sox	90	72	.556	6	49‍–‍32	41‍–‍40
Cleveland Indians	78	84	.481	18	44‍–‍37	34‍–‍47
Kansas City Royals	62	100	.383	34	34‍–‍47	28‍–‍53

=== Record vs. opponents ===
2006 American League record Source: MLB Standings Grid – 2006
Team	BAL	BOS	CWS	CLE	DET	KC	LAA	MIN	NYY	OAK	SEA	TB	TEX	TOR	NL
Baltimore	—	3–15	2–5	4–2	3–3	5–1	4–6	3–6	7–12	2–4	4–6	13–6	3–6	8–11	9–9
Boston	15–3	—	4–2	3–4	3–3	4–5	3–3	1–5	8–11	3–7	4–6	10–9	5–4	7–12	16–2
Chicago	5–2	2–4	—	8–11	12–7	11–8	6–3	9–10	2–4	3–3	5–4	3–3	5–5	5–4	14–4
Cleveland	2–4	4–3	11–8	—	6–13	10–8	4–5	8–11	3–4	3–6	4–5	6–1	5–4	4–2	8–10
Detroit	3–3	3–3	7–12	13–6	—	14–4	3–5	11–8	2–5	5–4	6–3	5–3	5–5	3–3	15–3
Kansas City	1–5	5–4	8–11	8–10	4–14	—	3–7	7–12	2–7	4–5	3–5	1–5	3–3	3–4	10–8
Los Angeles	6–4	3–3	3–6	5–4	5–3	7–3	—	4–2	6–4	11–8	10–9	7–2	11–8	4–6	7–11
Minnesota	6–3	5–1	10–9	11–8	8–11	12–7	2–4	—	3–3	6–4	5–3	6–1	4–5	2–5	16–2
New York	12–7	11–8	4–2	4–3	5–2	7–2	4–6	3–3	—	3–6	3–3	13–5	8–2	10–8	10–8
Oakland	4–2	7–3	3–3	6–3	4–5	5–4	8–11	4–6	6–3	—	17–2	6–3	9–10	6–4	8–10
Seattle	6–4	6–4	4–5	5–4	3–6	5–3	9–10	3–5	3–3	2–17	—	6–3	8–11	4–5	14–4
Tampa Bay	6–13	9–10	3–3	1–6	3–5	5–1	2–7	1–6	5–13	3–6	3–6	—	3–6	6–12	11–7
Texas	6–3	4–5	5–5	4–5	5–5	3–3	8–11	5–4	2–8	10–9	11–8	6–3	—	4–2	7–11
Toronto	11–8	12–7	4–5	2–4	3–3	4–3	6–4	5–2	8–10	4–6	5–4	12–6	2–4	—	9–9

=== Notable transactions ===
- June 14, 2006: Tony Batista designated for assignment. He was released on the 19th and cleared waivers on the 21st.
- June 15, 2006: Juan Castro traded to the Cincinnati Reds for outfielder Brandon Roberts.
- July 10, 2006: Rubén Sierra was released by the Twins.
- July 31, 2006: Kyle Lohse traded to the Cincinnati Reds for Minor League RHP Zach Ward.
- August 31, 2006: The Twins acquired veteran Phil Nevin from the Chicago Cubs for a player to be named later (Adam Harben).

=== Roster ===
2006 Minnesota Twins
Roster
Pitchers: 30 Scott Baker; 26 Boof Bonser; 28 Jesse Crain; 27 Willie Eyre; 21 Matt Garza; 54 Matt Guerrier; 47 Francisco Liriano; 49 Kyle Lohse; 36 Joe Nathan; 17 Pat Neshek; 60 Glen Perkins; 22 Brad Radke; 37 Dennys Reyes; 39 Juan Rincón; 57 Johan Santana; 52 Carlos Silva; 19 Mike Smith	Catchers: 41 Chris Heintz; 7 Joe Mauer; 55 Mike Redmond; Infielders: 18 Jason Bartlett; 77 Tony Batista; 25 Alexi Casilla; 1 Luis Castillo; 17 Juan Castro; 33 Justin Morneau; 15 Phil Nevin; 8 Nick Punto; 38 Luis Rodríguez; 32 Terry Tiffee	Outfielders: 5 Michael Cuddyer; 20 Lew Ford; 48 Torii Hunter; 16 Jason Kubel; 11 Josh Rabe; 23 Shannon Stewart; 12 Jason Tyner; 24 Rondell White; Other batters: 21 Rubén Sierra	Manager: 35 Ron Gardenhire; Coaches: 40 Rick Anderson (pitching); 9 Steve Liddle (bench); 43 Rick Stelmaszek (bullpen); 45 Scott Ullger (third base); 21 Joe Vavra (hitting); 13 Jerry White (first base)

=== Game log ===
2006 game log
April

#	Date	Opponent	Score	Win	Loss	Save	Attendance	Record
1	April 4	@ Blue Jays	6–3	Halladay	Santana	Ryan	50,449	0–1
2	April 5	@ Blue Jays	13–4	Radke	Towers		18,156	1–1
3	April 6	@ Blue Jays	6–3	Chacín	Silva	Ryan	16,221	1–2
4	April 7	@ Indians	11–6	Byrd	Lohse		42,445	1–3
5	April 8	@ Indians	3–0	Johnson	Baker	Wickman	25,107	1–4
6	April 9	@ Indians	3–2	Westbrook	Santana	Wickman	23,311	1–5
7	April 11	Athletics	7–6	Radke	Haren	Nathan	48,911	2–5
8	April 12	Athletics	6–5	Silva	Loaiza	Nathan	22,603	3–5
9	April 13	Athletics	8–2	Lohse	Blanton		13,520	4–5
10	April 14	Yankees	5–1	Baker	Mussina		30,622	5–5
11	April 15	Yankees	6–5	Rincón	Rivera		42,316	6–5
12	April 16	Yankees	9–3	Wang	Radke		22,627	6–6
13	April 18	Angels	8–2	Escobar	Silva	Shields	15,757	6–7
14	April 19	Angels	12–10	Nathan	Romero		21,507	7–7
15	April 20	Angels	6–4	Gregg	Crain	Rodríguez	12,990	7–8
16	April 21	@ White Sox	7–1	Buehrle	Santana		31,287	7–9
17	April 22	@ White Sox	9–2	García	Radke		38,955	7–10
18	April 23	@ White Sox	7–3	Contreras	Silva		38,102	7–11
19	April 25	@ Royals	2–1	Liriano	Hudson	Nathan	12,911	8–11
20	April 26	@ Royals	3–1	Hernández	Baker	Burgos	9,188	8–12
21	April 27	@ Royals	7–3	Santana	Redman		11,391	9–12
22	April 28	@ Tigers	9–0	Robertson	Radke		23,263	9–13
23	April 29	@ Tigers	18–1	Verlander	Silva		24,258	9–14
24	April 30	@ Tigers	6–0	Rogers	Lohse		24,323	9–15

May

#	Date	Opponent	Score	Win	Loss	Save	Attendance	Record
25	May 1	Mariners	8–2	Piñeiro	Baker		11,796	9–16
26	May 2	Mariners	5–1	Santana	Washburn		14,513	10–16
27	May 3	Royals	6–1	Radke	Mays		15,996	11–16
28	May 4	Royals	1–0	Affeldt	Silva	Burgos	11,803	11–17
29	May 5	Tigers	9–6	Rogers	Lohse	Jones	23,892	11–18
30	May 6	Tigers	7–6	Rincón	Jones		20,907	12–18
31	May 7	Tigers	4–2	Santana	Maroth	Nathan	20,548	13–18
32	May 8	@ Rangers	6–4	Koronka	Radke	Otsuka	18,609	13–19
33	May 9	@ Rangers	15–5	Silva	Millwood		19,316	14–19
34	May 10	@ Rangers	4–3	Loshe	Padilla	Nathan	23,008	15–19
35	May 12	White Sox	10–1	Santana	Garland		30,473	16–19
36	May 13	White Sox	8–4	Radke	Vázquez		33,021	17–19
37	May 14	White Sox	9–7	Buehrle	Silva	Jenks	21,796	17–20
38	May 15	White Sox	7–3	García	Baker		19,413	17–21
39	May 16	@ Tigers	7–4	Robertson	Lohse	Jones	18,115	17–22
40	May 17	@ Tigers	2–0	Verlander	Santana	Jones	16,669	17–23
41	May 18	@ Tigers	5–3	Rogers	Radke	Jones	26,732	17–24
42	May 19	@ Brewers	7–1	Liriano	Davis		28,462	18–24
43	May 20	@ Brewers	16–10	Baker	Hendrickson		43,422	19–24
44	May 21	@ Brewers	5–3	Capuano	Crain	Turnbow	35,180	19–25
45	May 23	Indians	6–5	Nathan	Mota		19,334	20–25
46	May 24	Indians	11–0	Sabathia	Radke		22,789	20–26
47	May 26	Mariners	3–1	Liriano	Hernández	Nathan	28,082	21–26
48	May 27	Mariners	9–5	Bonser	Moyer	Rincón	25,305	22–26
49	May 28	Matiners	4–3	Nathan	Guardado		24,388	23–26
50	May 29	@ Angels	4–3	Shields	Crain		40,007	23–27
51	May 30	@ Angels	6–3	Weaver	Baker	Rodríguez	37,299	23–28
52	May 31	@ Angels	7–1	Liriano	Santana		40,001	24–28

June

#	Date	Opponent	Score	Win	Loss	Save	Attendance	Record
53	June 1	@ Athletics	4–0	Zito	Bonser		12,025	24–29
54	June 2	@ Athletics	2–1	Santana	Saarloos	Nathan	16,138	25–29
55	June 3	@ Athletics	2–1	Halsey	Radke	Street	23,194	25–30
56	June 4	@ Athletics	5–1	Halsey	Silva		25,247	25–31
57	June 6	@ Mariners	4–2	Hernández	Liriano	Putz	21,028	25–32
58	June 7	@ Mariners	10–9	Mateo	Crain		24,785	25–33
59	June 8	@ Mariners	7–3	Santana	Piñeiro		27,341	26–33
60	June 9	Orioles	7–5	Nathan	Chen		22,894	27–33
61	June 10	Orioles	9–7	Cabrera	Silva		24,478	27–34
62	June 11	Orioles	4–0	Liriano	Bédard		25,438	28–34
63	June 13	Red Sox	5–2	Reyes	Tavárez		25,531	29–34
64	June 14	Red Sox	8–1	Radke	Clement		26,492	30–34
65	June 15	Red Sox	5–3	Silva	Wakefield	Nathan	21,191	31–34
66	June 16	@ Pirates	4–2	Liriano	Snell	Nathan	33,025	32–34
67	June 17	@ Pirates	5–3	Crain	Marte	Nathan	34,085	33–34
68	June 18	@ Pirates	8–2	Santana	Pérez		25,104	34–34
69	June 20	@ Astros	6–5	Nathan	Miller		32,713	35–34
70	June 21	@ Astros	5–3	Wheeler	Lohse	Lidge	33,243	35–35
71	June 22	@ Astros	4–2	Liriano	Clemens	Nathan	43,769	36–35
72	June 23	Cubs	7–2	Santana	Mármol		34,361	37–35
73	June 24	Cubs	3–0	Bonser	Prior	Nathan	42,304	38–35
74	June 25	Cubs	8–1	Radke	Marshall		35,128	39–35
75	June 26	Dodgers	8–2	Silva	Billingsley		22,258	40–35
76	June 27	Dodgers	9–2	Liriano	Lowe		30,681	41–35
77	June 28	Dodgers	6–3	Santana	Pérez	Nathan	34,157	42–35
78	June 30	Brewers	8–2	Radke	Villanueva		28,412	43–35

July

#	Date	Opponent	Score	Win	Loss	Save	Attendance	Record
79	July 1	Brewers	10–7	Rincón	Turnbow	Nathan	35,056	44–35
80	July 2	Brewers	8–0	Liriano	Jackson		35,466	45–35
81	July 3	@ Royals	6–5	Crain	Sisco	Nathan	28,401	46–35
82	July 4	@ Royals	7–2	Gobble	Bonser	Dessens	23,996	46–36
83	July 5	@ Royals	6–3	Affeldt	Crain	Burgos	12,085	46–37
84	July 7	@ Rangers	9–4	Wasdin	Silva		30,207	46–38
85	July 8	@ Rangers	4–0	Liriano	Rheinecker		36,035	47–38
86	July 9	@ Rangers	5–2	Bauer	Santana	Otsuka	23,268	47–39
87	July 13	Indians	6–4	Lee	Liriano	Wickman	21,085	47–40
88	July 14	Indians	3–2	Nathan	Mujica		21,279	48–40
89	July 15	Indians	6–2	Santana	Sabathia		33,904	49–40
90	July 16	Indians	5–2	Silva	Sowers	Nathan	31,838	50–40
91	July 17	Devil Rays	6–3	Baker	Corcoran	Nathan	17,071	51–40
92	July 18	Devil Rays	8–1	Liriano	Kazmir		22,808	52–40
93	July 19	Devil Rays	7–2	Radke	Seo		25,866	53–40
94	July 20	Devil Rays	6–4	Santana	Shields	Nathan	25,104	54–40
95	July 21	@ Indians	14–6	Reyes	Sabathia		29,695	55–40
96	July 22	@ Indians	11–0	Sowers	Baker		26,895	55–41
97	July 23	@ Indians	3–1	Liriano	Westbrook	Nathan	25,889	56–41
98	July 24	@ White Sox	7–4	Radke	Vázquez		39,750	57–41
99	July 25	@ White Sox	4–3	Santana	Contreras	Nathan	36,984	58–41
100	July 26	@ White Sox	7–4	Silva	Buehrle	Nathan	39,387	59–41
101	July 28	Tigers	3–2	Rodney	Rincon	Jones	45,478	59–42
102	July 29	Tigers	8–6	Robertson	Radke	Jones	45,496	59–43
103	July 30	Tigers	6–4	Neshek	Bonderman	Nathan	43,204	60–43
104	July 31	Rangers	15–2	Silva	Rheinecker		19,532	61–43

August

#	Date	Opponent	Score	Win	Loss	Save	Attendance	Record
105	August 1	Rangers	9–0	Eaton	Baker		25,969	61–44
106	August 2	Rangers	10–2	Wells	Bonser		26,492	61–45
107	August 3	@ Royals	8–2	Radke	de la Rosa		12,022	62–45
108	August 4	@ Royals	8–5	Reyes	Dohmann	Nathan	19,394	63–45
109	August 5	@ Royals	14–3	Silva	Hernández		25,131	64–45
110	August 6	@ Royals	11–5	Reyes	Wellemeyer		14,064	65–45
111	August 7	@ Tigers	9–3	Miner	Liriano		34,870	65–46
112	August 8	@ Tigers	4–2	Radke	Robertson	Nathan	35,624	66–46
113	August 9	@ Tigers	4–3	Santana	Zumaya	Nathan	36,339	67–46
114	August 10	Blue Jays	5–0	Lilly	Silva		30,118	67–47
115	August 11	Blue Jays	7–1	Burnett	Garza		31,814	67–48
116	August 12	Blue Jays	4–0	Downs	Bonser		36,261	67–49
117	August 13	Blue Jays	5–0	Radke	Marcum		32,811	68–49
118	August 15	Indians	4–1	Santana	Westbrook		34,854	69–49
119	August 16	Indians	7–2	Neshek	Carmona		42,328	70–49
120	August 17	Indians	3–2	Byrd	Garza		27,664	70–50
121	August 18	White Sox	7–3	Neshek	García		43,204	71–50
122	August 19	White Sox	4–1	Garland	Radke	Jenks	46,215	71–51
123	August 20	White Sox	7–3	Santana	Vázquez		42,537	72–51
124	August 22	@ Orioles	6–3	Loewen	Silva	Ray	19,756	72–52
125	August 23	@ Orioles	4–1	Garza	López	Nathan	19,258	73–52
126	August 24	@ Orioles	11–2	Bonser	Benson		24,848	74–52
127	August 25	@ White Sox	5–4	Crain	MacDougal	Nathan	35,931	75–52
128	August 26	@ White Sox	8–7	Eyre	Thornton		38,636	76–52
129	August 27	@ White Sox	6–1	Buehrle	Silva		35,193	76–53
130	August 29	Royals	2–0	Redman	Garza		24,904	76–54
131	August 30	Royals	4–3	Hudson	Bonser	Nelson	28,668	76–55
132	August 31	Royals	3–1	Santana	de la Rosa	Nathan	21,287	77–55

September/October

#	Date	Opponent	Score	Win	Loss	Save	Attendance	Record
133	September 1	@ Yankees	8–1	Lidle	Silva		54,311	77–56
134	September 2	@ Yankees	6–1	Baker	Karstens	Crain	53,220	78–56
135	September 3	@ Yankees	10–1	Rasner	Garza		55,155	78–57
136	September 4	@ Devil Rays	2–1	Bonser	Corcoran	Nathan	15,910	79–57
137	September 5	@ Devil Rays	8–0	Santana	Seo		8,256	80–57
138	September 6	@ Devil Rays	4–2	Shawn Camp	Neshek	McClung	8,492	80–58
139	September 7	Tigers	7–2	Verlander	Baker		21,229	80–59
140	September 8	Tigers	9–5	Neshek	Ledezma		29,042	81–59
141	September 9	Tigers	2–1	Bonser	Robertson	Nathan	39,160	82–59
142	September 10	Tigers	12–1	Santana	Bonderman		40,158	83–59
143	September 11	Athletics	9–4	Silva	Blanton	Nathan	15,728	84–59
144	September 12	Athletics	7–5	Reyes	Kennedy	Nathan	20,991	85–59
145	September 13	Athletics	1–0	Haren	Garza	Street	18,902	85–60
146	September 14	@ Indians	9–4	Crain	Davis		21,424	86–60
147	September 15	@ Indians	5–4	Cabrera	Neshek		32,473	86–61
148	September 16	@ Indians	4–1	Silva	Sabathia	Nathan	26,757	87–61
149	September 17	@ Indians	6–1	Baker	Byrd	Guerrier	20,324	88–61
150	September 19	@ Red Sox	7–3	Garza	Wakefield		36,242	89–61
151	September 20	@ Red Sox	8–2	Bonser	Hansen		36,484	90–61
152	September 21	@ Red Sox	6–0	Beckett	Santana		36,434	90–62
153	September 22	@ Orioles	7–3	Cabrera	Silva		21,051	90–63
154	September 23	@ Orioles	8–5	Guerrier	Bédard	Nathan	21,980	91–63
155	September 24	@ Orioles	6–3	Garza	Loewen	Nathan	23,005	92–63
156	September 25	Royals	8–1	Bonser	de la Rosa		18,108	93–63
157	September 26	Royals	3–2	Santana	Peralta	Nathan	24,819	94–63
158	September 27	Royals	6–4	Redman	Silva	Nelson	28,540	94–64
159	September 28	Royals	2–1	Nathan	Dohmann		26,254	95–64
160	September 29	White Sox	4–3	Freddy García	Bonser	Jenks	45,439	95–65
161	September 30	White Sox	6–3	Garland	Garza		46,219	95–66
162	October 1	White Sox	5–1	Silva	Vázquez		45,182	96–66

== Team overview ==
=== Offense: Power and the Piranhas ===
For the first time since 1987, the Twins had legitimate power hitters in Justin Morneau, Torii Hunter, and Michael Cuddyer. On August 9, Morneau became the first Twin to hit 30 or more home runs since 1987, when Tom Brunansky, Gary Gaetti, and Kent Hrbek did it. The Twins led the major leagues in batting average with a team average of .287.

During the same span:

- Every other team in the majors had at least three 30-homer hitters.
- Nine teams had 20 or more 30-homer hitters.
- 478 players, including 14 in 2006, hit 30 or more home runs in a season.
- 138 players hit 40 or more homers. Twenty of those reached 50.

Morneau finished the season with 34 home runs, 130 runs batted in, and a .321 average and was named American League MVP.

Both Morneau and Joe Mauer won their first Silver Slugger Awards.

Hunter enjoyed a late season surge to also reach the 30 home run mark. On September 25, he homered off Kansas City Royals pitcher Zack Greinke in the bottom of the 7th inning and became the second Twin to hit 30 home runs in 2006. He finished the season with 31 home runs and 98 runs batted in.

Michael Cuddyer also had a breakout season as the Twins' cleanup hitter. He did not start the season as a regular player, but eventually replaced the ineffective opening day right fielder, Jason Kubel. By June, he was hitting fourth in the lineup, and he finished the season with 24 home runs, 109 runs batted in, scored 102 runs, and hit for a .284 average.

Morneau and catcher Joe Mauer may have finally earned the nickname "the M&M Boys", that had been prematurely applied to them early in the 2005 season. (This was the nickname applied to Mickey Mantle and Roger Maris in the early 1960s.) Not only did Mauer win the American League batting title, but he led the major leagues with a .347 average, finishing ahead of National League champion Freddy Sanchez. Mauer was the first catcher to lead either the American League or the majors in hitting. Two catchers did win the National League batting title. Bubbles Hargrave of the Cincinnati Reds did it in 1926. Ernie Lombardi led the National League twice: once for the Reds in 1938 and once for the Boston Braves in 1942. However, neither catcher won the major league title.

These strong hitters were complemented by the top and bottom of the Twins' order, where the players gave the hitters plenty of opportunities to drive in runs. Midway through the season, the Twins opted for a lineup that included Jason Tyner batting eighth, Jason Bartlett ninth, Luis Castillo first, and Nick Punto second. Manager Ron Gardenhire said that these players were like four leadoff hitters: all were fast and hit for average but not power. All four hit between .290 (Punto) and .312 (Tyner), but hit a combined six home runs.

Players like this caused Chicago White Sox manager Ozzie Guillén to dub the team "the piranhas." Said Guillen:

"All those little piranhas -- blooper here, blooper here, beat out a ground ball, hit a home run, they're up by four. They get up by four with that bullpen? See you at the national anthem tomorrow. When I sit down and look at the lineup, give me the New York Yankees. Give me those guys because they've got holes. You can pitch around them, you can pitch to them. These little guys? Castillo and all of them? People worry about the catcher, what's his name, Mauer? Fine, yeah, a good hitter, but worry about the little [guys], they're on base all the time."

Despite the fact that the term came from a rival manager, it was quickly embraced by both the players and the fans, as well as media outlets such as ESPN. After running a popular "Twins Territory" commercial in 2007 featuring Jason Bartlett and Nick Punto at the Mall of America's Underwater World as "Piranhas" the Minnesota Twins organization marketed official T-shirts, hats, signs, the team even had a "Little Piranha Night" in which piranha finger puppets were given to fans attending the game that evening.

The four finished their MLB careers hitting a combined .274 and just 79 HRs in 14,262 at-bats.

Team Leaders
Statistic	Player	Quantity
HR	Justin Morneau	34
RBI	Justin Morneau	130
BA	Joe Mauer	.347*
SB	Luis Castillo	25
Runs	Michael Cuddyer	102

*Major League Leader

=== Pitching ===
For much of the season, the Twins' starting rotation was its most apparent weakness. This is surprising, because the 2005 Minnesota Twins had one of the strongest rotations in baseball. The team started the season with a rotation of Johan Santana, Brad Radke, Carlos Silva, Kyle Lohse, and Scott Baker. By September, only Santana could be counted on for a full, effective start.

Baker was not effective and was quickly demoted to the minors, though he came back a couple times and had a couple competent starts. Lohse was ineffective, surly, and traded to the Cincinnati Reds midway through the season. Radke started slowly but seemed to find his form, providing some consistency to the number two spot before being sidelined with a torn labrum and a stress fracture in his right shoulder. Silva was unable to find his 2005 form, finishing the season with an ERA of 5.94. He did make a few strong starts in September before regressing.

On May 19, talented rookie Francisco Liriano entered the starting rotation. He pitched well enough to earn an All-Star berth, finishing with a 12–3 record and a minuscule ERA of 2.16. Unfortunately, he was sidelined after the All-Star break with elbow problems. He did not pitch at all in 2007, as he was recovering from Tommy John surgery. Boof Bonser had an up-and-down season, but finished strong with a 7–6 record and 4.22 ERA. This earned him a spot in the postseason rotation. Matt Garza was the team's top pitching prospect, but was inconsistent during his first partial year in the majors.

The Twins had one of baseball's bullpens. Dennys Reyes, signed to a minor-league deal during the offseason, provided a surprise with a winning season as the Twins' sole left-handed reliever. Right-handers Jesse Crain and Juan Rincón set the stage throughout the season for closer Joe Nathan, with homegrown rookie Pat Neshek contributing some innings after being recalled from the minor leagues in July. Pitchers like Willie Eyre and Matt Guerrier ate up innings when the starters faltered.

In the May 27 game against Seattle, Jesse Crain – with a lead – loaded the bases with no outs in the eighth. Juan Rincón replaced Crain, and promptly ended the threat – with just one pitch – by inducing Mariner Kenji Johjima to hit into a triple play. Rincon threw 26 more pitches in the ninth for the save.

Team Leaders
Statistic	Player	Quantity
Wins	Johan Santana	19*
Saves	Joe Nathan	36
IP	Johan Santana	233 2/3^{1}
ERA	Johan Santana	2.77^{1}
Strikeouts	Johan Santana	245^{1}

*Tied for league lead
^{1}Led league

=== Defense ===
The Twins finished tied for second place in the American League with a .986 fielding percentage. The team's defense was noticeably stronger when the left side of the infield was revamped in June, when the team traded shortstop Juan Castro to Cincinnati and released third baseman Tony Batista. Jason Bartlett and Nick Punto stepped into those roles, providing an immediate upgrade.

In center field, Torii Hunter won his sixth Gold Glove Award.

== Player stats ==
=== Batting ===
==== Starters by position ====
Note: Pos = Position; G = Games played; AB = At bats; H = Hits; Avg. = Batting average; HR = Home runs; RBI = Runs batted in

Pos	Player	G	AB	H	Avg.	HR	RBI
C	Joe Mauer	140	521	181	.347	13	84
1B	Justin Morneau	157	592	190	.321	34	130
2B	Luis Castillo	142	584	173	.296	3	49
SS	Jason Bartlett	99	333	103	.309	2	32
3B	Nick Punto	135	459	133	.290	1	45
LF	Lew Ford	104	234	53	.226	4	18
CF	Torii Hunter	147	557	155	.278	31	98
RF	Michael Cuddyer	150	557	158	.284	24	109
DH	Rondell White	99	337	83	.246	7	38

==== Other batters ====
Note: G = Games played; AB = At bats; H = Hits; Avg. = Batting average; HR = Home runs; RBI = Runs batted in

Player	G	AB	H	Avg.	HR	RBI
Jason Kubel	73	220	53	.241	8	26
Jason Tyner	62	218	68	.312	0	18
Mike Redmond	47	179	61	.341	0	23
Tony Batista	50	178	42	.236	5	21
Shannon Stewart	44	174	51	.293	2	21
Juan Castro	50	156	36	.231	1	14
Luis Rodríguez	59	115	27	.235	2	6
Josh Rabe	24	49	14	.286	3	7
Terry Tiffee	20	45	11	.244	2	6
Phil Nevin	16	42	8	.190	1	4
Rubén Sierra	14	28	5	.179	0	4
Alexi Casilla	9	4	1	.250	0	0
Chris Heintz	2	1	0	.000	0	0

=== Pitching ===
==== Starting pitchers ====
Note: G = Games pitched; IP = Innings pitched; W = Wins; L = Losses; ERA = Earned run average; SO = Strikeouts

Player	G	IP	W	L	ERA	SO
Johan Santana	34	233.2	19	6	2.77	245
Carlos Silva	36	180.1	11	15	5.94	70
Brad Radke	28	162.1	12	9	4.32	83
Francisco Liriano	28	121.0	12	3	2.16	144
Boof Bonser	18	100.1	7	6	4.22	84
Scott Baker	16	83.1	5	8	6.37	62
Matt Garza	10	50.0	3	6	5.76	38
Mike Smith	1	3.0	0	0	12.00	1

==== Other pitchers ====
Note: G = Games pitched; IP = Innings pitched; W = Wins; L = Losses; ERA = Earned run average; SO = Strikeouts

Player	G	IP	W	L	ERA	SO
Kyle Lohse	22	63.2	2	5	7.07	46

==== Relief pitchers ====
Note: G = Games pitched; W = Wins; L = Losses; SV = Saves; ERA = Earned run average; SO = Strikeouts

Player	G	W	L	SV	ERA	SO
Joe Nathan	64	7	0	36	1.58	95
Juan Rincón	75	3	1	1	2.91	65
Jesse Crain	68	4	5	1	3.52	60
Dennys Reyes	66	5	0	0	0.89	49
Willie Eyre	42	1	0	0	5.31	26
Matt Guerrier	39	1	0	1	3.36	37
Pat Neshek	32	4	2	0	2.19	53
Glen Perkins	4	0	0	0	1.59	6

== Playoffs ==
After the Twins won the division, the American League playoff matchups were decided as follows: number two seed Minnesota Twins hosting number three seed Oakland Athletics, and number one seed New York Yankees hosting the wild card Detroit Tigers.

The Twins were defeated by Oakland in a three-game sweep, ending their playoff run for 2006. The Twins got great starts from both Johan Santana and Boof Bonser (who made his first post season appearance) at the Metrodome. After losing game 1 by the score of 3–2, the Twins came back to even the score at 2 in game 2. With two outs and a runner on first in the top of the 7th inning, Mark Kotsay hit a line drive to center field that Torii Hunter made a valiant dive for. Unfortunately, the ball sailed past him all the way to the wall, resulting in an inside-the-park home run for Kotsay. This play seemed to take all the momentum away from the Twins. The Twins never led in any game in this series.

== Other post-season awards ==
- Calvin R. Griffith Award (Most Valuable Twin) – Justin Morneau
- Joseph W. Haynes Award (Twins Pitcher of the Year) – Johan Santana
- Bill Boni Award (Twins Outstanding Rookie) – Francisco Liriano
- Charles O. Johnson Award (Most Improved Twin) – Michael Cuddyer
- Dick Siebert Award (Upper Midwest Player of the Year) – Joe Mauer
- Bob Allison Award (Leadership Award) – Brad Radke
- Mike Augustin Award ("Media Good Guy" Award) – Torii Hunter
  - The above awards are voted on by the Twin Cities chapter of the BBWAA
- Carl R. Pohlad Award (Outstanding Community Service) – Michael Cuddyer
- Sherry Robertson Award (Twins Outstanding Farm System Position Player) – Alexi Casilla
- Jim Rantz Award (Twins Outstanding Farm System Pitcher) – Matt Garza
- Kirby Puckett Award (Alumni Community Service) – Harmon Killebrew
- Herb Carneal Award (Lifetime Achievement Award) – Herb Carneal

== Farm system ==
Level	Team	League	Manager
AAA	Rochester Red Wings	International League	Stan Cliburn
AA	New Britain Rock Cats	Eastern League	Riccardo Ingram
A	Fort Myers Miracle	Florida State League	Kevin Boles
A	Beloit Snappers	Midwest League	Jeff Smith
Rookie	Elizabethton Twins	Appalachian League	Ray Smith
Rookie	GCL Twins	Gulf Coast League	Nelson Prada
