= Fort Myers Mighty Mussels =

- Founded in 1962 in Miami, Florida; Based in Fort Myers, Florida since 1992
Team logo
Cap insignia

Minor league affiliations
- Class: Single-A (2021–present)
- Previous classes: Class A-Advanced (1990–2020); Class A (1964–1989); Class D (1962–1963)
- League: Florida State League (1962–present)
- Division: West Division

Major league affiliations
- Team: Minnesota Twins (1993–present)
- Previous teams: Co-op (1992); San Diego Padres (1983–1984); Baltimore Orioles (1966–1981); Philadelphia Phillies (1962–1965)

Minor league titles
- League titles (7): 1969; 1970; 1971; 1972; 1978; 2014; 2018
- Division titles (4): 1995; 2008; 2014; 2018
- First-half titles (5): 2003; 2008; 2009; 2014; 2022
- Second-half titles (5): 1995; 2000; 2006; 2009; 2018

Team data
- Name: Fort Myers Mighty Mussels (2020–present)
- Previous names: Fort Myers Miracle (1992–2019); Miami Miracle (1989–1991); Miami Marlins (1982–1988); Miami Orioles (1971–1981); Miami Marlins (1962–1970)
- Colors: Twins navy, gulf purple, sunset lavender, golden sun, yellow sand, sky blue, white
- Mascot: Mussel Man
- Ballpark: Hammond Stadium (1992–present)
- Previous parks: Pompano Beach Municipal Stadium (1990–1991); FIU Baseball Stadium (1989); Bobby Maduro Miami Stadium (1962–1988)
- Owner(s)/ Operator(s): John Martin / Kaufy Baseball, LLC
- President: Chris Peters
- General manager: Judd Loveland
- Manager: Jordan Smith
- Website: milb.com/fort-myers

The Fort Myers Mighty Mussels are a Minor League Baseball team of the Florida State League and the Single-A affiliate of the Minnesota Twins. They are located in Fort Myers, Florida, and play their home games at the Lee County Sports Complex at Hammond Stadium, which has a capacity of 9,300 and opened in 1991. The park is also used as the Minnesota Twins' spring training facility.

The majority owner is Kaufy Baseball, LLC, a privately held company managed by John Martin, who purchased a controlling interest in the club from Andrew Kaufmann of Zawyer Sports & Entertainment in January 2022.

== History ==
The Mighty Mussels franchise began in Miami during the 1961–1962 offseason to serve as the Class D affiliate of the Philadelphia Phillies. The team was named the Miami Marlins in honor of the original Marlins of the Triple-A International League who had moved to San Juan, Puerto Rico (and subsequently Charleston, West Virginia), following the 1960 season.

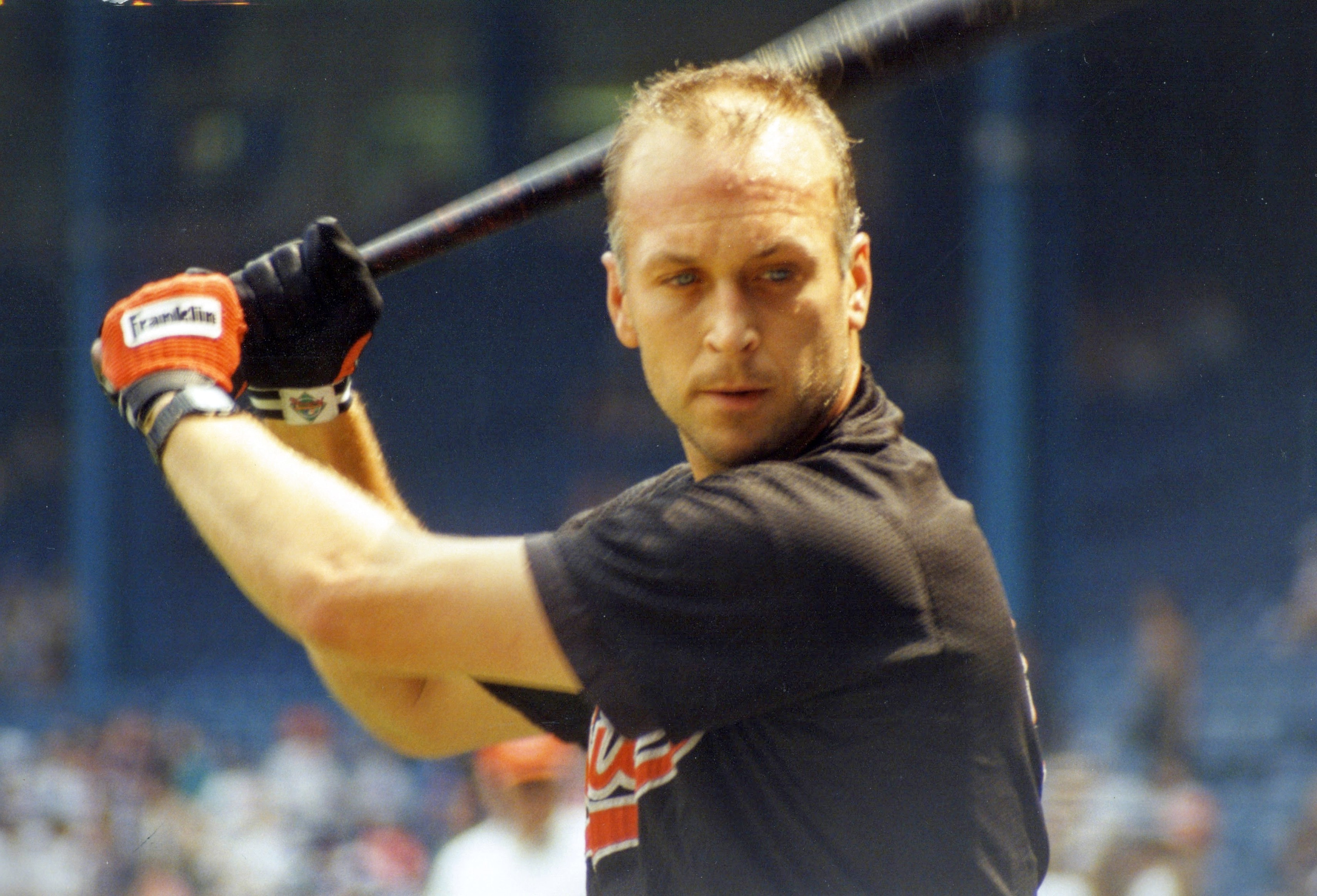
Before embarking on his Hall of Fame career with the Baltimore Orioles, Cal Ripken Jr. played for the Miami Orioles

In 1963, there was a restructuring of the classification system of all Minor League Baseball, which resulted in the FSL changing from Class D (equivalent to a Rookie-level league today) to Class A. They became a Baltimore Orioles affiliate in 1966, and were renamed the Miami Orioles after their MLB parent club from 1971 to 1981. The Orioles owned the franchise until it was sold to an investment group led by then-Class AAA American Association president Joe Ryan on January 30, 1976.

Upon the Baltimore Orioles' severing of their affiliation with the Miami Orioles following the 1981 season, the franchise reverted to the Marlins name and participated in the 1982 FSL season as an independent entry. Without a Major League affiliate, this team was composed of undrafted players from the area, free agents from various organizations and players on loan from the Baltimore Orioles, San Diego Padres, and Oakland A's organizations.

The following season the Miami Marlins became a San Diego Padres affiliate. This partnership lasted two years and the Marlins were without a parent club for the 1985 season. They filled their roster with ten former major leaguers looking to rejuvenate their careers, including Derrel Thomas, who made it back to MLB later that season with the Philadelphia Phillies. The Marlins continued this practice through the 1988 season. One of their signees in 1987, Dennis Martínez, also returned to MLB, signing with the Montreal Expos later that season. In 1987, the team started receiving some players on loan from the Tokyo Giants. This lasted through the 1988 season.

In 1988, the team began the season at Bobby Maduro Miami Stadium, but moved later in the season to the Hialeah-Miami Lakes High School field. The Marlins had per-game attendance totals of approximately 100 fans.

On February 22, 1989, the South Florida Baseball Club Limited Partnership purchased the Marlins and were renamed the Miami Miracle. They moved the team from Miami Stadium, which the team had called home for the vast majority of its time in South Florida, to Florida International University's University Park with some games to be held at Key West High School. South Florida BC LP consisted of Stuart Revo, managing partner, Marvin Goldklang, South Florida commercial real estate developer Michael M. Adler; Potamkin Television, New Age Broadcasting automobile dealership group Potamkin Companies president Alan Potamkin; Sillerman-Magee Communication Management Corp. CEO Robert Sillerman, actor Bill Murray and recording artist Jimmy Buffett. E.J. Narcise was named general manager. While having a partial affiliation with the Cleveland Indians and the Tokyo Giants of the Japanese league, the Miracle were considered an independent entry in the FSL.

The team received only nine players from the Indians for the 1989 season and had to scramble to find players like pitcher Longo Garcia who was released by the San Francisco Giants organization having been a tenth round draft pick. Jim Gattis was named manager by April 1989.

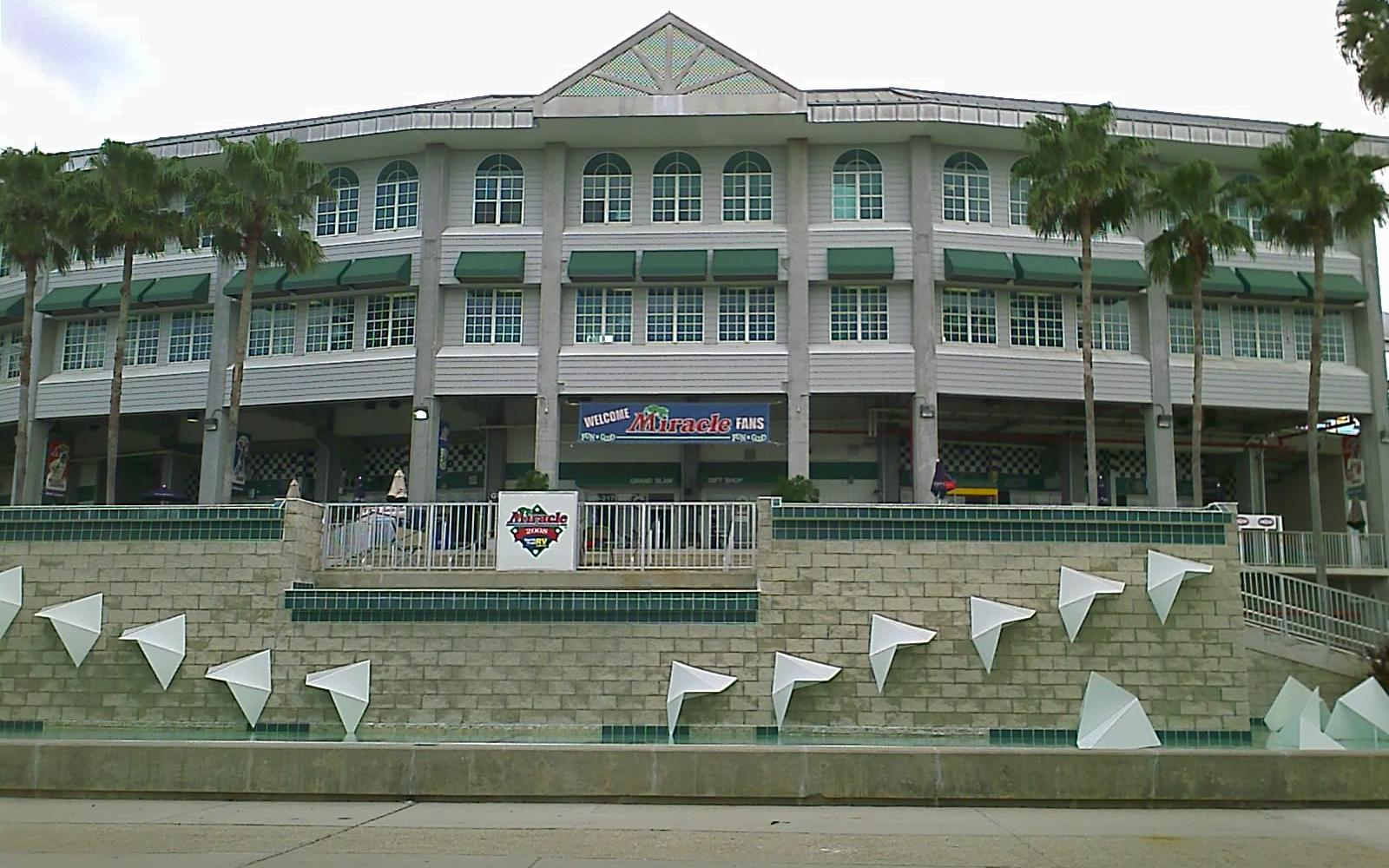
Hammond Stadium

The Miracle were sold again a year later to the Marv Goldklang Group. Mike Veeck (son of Hall of Fame inductee Bill Veeck, and author of the book, Fun is Good) also became part owner of the organization while Murray and Buffett still maintained their shares as well.

In 1990, the team moved again, playing its home games at Pompano Beach Municipal Stadium. The team spent two seasons in Pompano Beach with future big league skipper Fredi González at the helm.

In 1992, with the impending arrival of MLB's Florida Marlins, the Goldklang Group relocated the Miracle to Fort Myers. The Miracle operated as a co-op club with the Minnesota Twins that season, and became a full Twins affiliate a year later.

In December 2019, the franchise announced that it would be rebranded ahead of the 2020 season and become known as the Fort Myers Mighty Mussels.

In conjunction with Major League Baseball's restructuring of Minor League Baseball in 2021, the Mighty Mussels were organized into the Low-A Southeast at the Low-A classification. In 2022, the Low-A Southeast became known as the Florida State League, the name historically used by the regional circuit prior to the 2021 reorganization, and was reclassified as a Single-A circuit.

== Mighty Mussels in Fort Myers ==
The 2008 1st & 2nd half Western Division champions take the field in game 2 of the playoffs at Hammond Stadium

Since moving to Fort Myers for the 1992 season, the Mighty Mussels have qualified for the Florida State League Playoffs eight times. As the Miracle, the club won the FSL West Division first half in 2003 and 2008 and the FSL West second half in 1995, 2000 and 2006. In 2009, the Florida State League adopted a North–South setup of divisions. In that year, the Miracle won both the FSL South first and second half under manager Jeff Smith. Despite a regular season record of 80–58 and winning game one of a best-of-three series on the road, the Charlotte Stone Crabs defeated the Miracle in games two and three.

After a three-season hiatus, the Miracle returned to the FSL Playoffs under first-year manager Doug Mientkiewicz. Guiding a star-studded team of Twins prospects such as Miguel Sano, Kennys Vargas and Eddie Rosario, the Miracle won the first half in the FSL South with a 45–22 record. The 45 wins tied the franchise record for the most in a single half and the winning percentage of .672 marked the best for a half in team history. Posting the best overall record in the Florida State League at 79–56 during the regular season, the Miracle again fell to the Stone Crabs in the FSL South Divisional Playoff. Charlotte held the league-best Fort Myers offense, that included the consensus top prospect in baseball Byron Buxton, to just one run in a two-game sweep.

== 2014 championship season ==
Entering the 2014 season, the Miracle had appeared in the Florida State League Championship series twice; losing to the Daytona Cubs in 1995 and 2008. For a second consecutive season, Mientkiewicz led the Miracle to a first half title in the FSL South, narrowly edging the St. Lucie Mets by one game in the standings with a final day win, 4–0, over the Bradenton Marauders. Fort Myers finished with a first half record of 41–28 with a roster featuring top prospects José Berríos, Jorge Polanco and Adam Brett Walker. During the 2014 campaign, Walker broke the Miracle franchise record for home runs in a season with 25; previously held by Brock Peterson with 21 in 2006. Walker was also a 2014 FSL All-Star Game MVP and Home Run Derby Champion at the 2014 FSL All-Star Game in Bradenton, at McKechnie Field. In the second half, the Miracle posted a record of 41–29 for an overall mark of 82–57, second-best in team history.

In the FSL South Divisional Playoff, the Miracle faced Bradenton. Trailing 7–3 in the top of the fourth inning, Jason Kanzler hit an opposite field grand slam to tie the game in the first of a best-of-three series. After the fifth inning, play was halted for 58 minutes due to rain. When the game resumed in the top of the sixth, Dalton Hicks drove in the eventual game-winning run with a single. The Miracle won game one, 8–7, and Kanzler had six runs batted in. In game two, the Miracle scored six runs in the bottom of the third inning to take 6–1 lead. Miracle starter D. J. Baxendale earned the win with six innings allowing just one unearned run and five strikeouts. After a two-game sweep of the Marauders, the Miracle advanced to the FSL Championship series for the third time in team history.

Facing the Cubs again, the Miracle hosted the first two games of the best-of-five series at JetBlue Park. The Miracle pitching staff allowed just one run in a pair of wins. Fort Myers took game one, 5–1, and game two, 5–0. With a 2–0 series lead for the Miracle, the Cubs staved off elimination in game three at Jackie Robinson Ballpark in Daytona, Florida After a two-hour, seven-minute delay, the Cubs and Miracle engaged in a back-and-forth battle with Daytona eventually going on to win, 8–7. The Cubs trailed 6–5 in the bottom of the eighth inning, but took the lead on a three-run homer by Wilson Contreras. After the Cubs' win, the two teams had to wait a day after heavy storms made the field in Daytona unplayable. On Monday, September 8, the Miracle and Cubs played game four. Fort Myers built a 2–0 lead midway through the fourth inning. Daytona tied the game in the sixth. Going into extra innings, Kanzler gave the Miracle a 4–2 lead with a two-run homer in the top of the eleventh. Zack Jones recorded a perfect ninth inning, striking out Contreras for the save. The FSL Championship was the first in team history since moving to Fort Myers in 1992. The series win also marked the first time the Daytona Cubs had lost a FSL Playoff series.

== Season-by-season ==
These statistics are current through the 2022 season, and include seasons dating back to 1971.

League champions †	Finals appearance *	Division winner ^	Wild card berth ¤

Year	League	Division	Regular season										Postseason
Year	League	Division	1st half					2nd half					Postseason
Year	League	Division	Finish	Wins	Losses	Win%	GB	Finish	Wins	Losses	Win%	GB	Postseason
Miami Orioles
1971	FSL	East	1st ^	94	47	.667	—						Won semifinals (Tampa Tarpons) 2–0; Won finals (Cocoa Astros) 2–1
1972	FSL	East	1st ^	73	57	.562	—						Won semifinals (Tampa Tarpons) 2–0; Won finals (Daytona Beach Dodgers) 2–1
1973	FSL	South	2nd	77	64	.546	4.5						
1974	FSL	South	3rd	74	58	.561	8.5						
1975	FSL	South	1st ^	79	57	.581	—						Lost semifinals (Tampa Tarpons) 2–0
1976	FSL	South	1st ^	79	63	.556	—						Lost semifinals (Lakeland Flying Tigers) 2–0
1977	FSL	South	2nd	72	66	.522	8.0						Lost semifinals (Lakeland Flying Tigers) 2–0
1978	FSL	South	1st	76	65	.539	—						Won semifinals (Fort Myers Royals) 1–0; Won finals (Lakeland Flying Tigers) 2–1
1979	FSL	South	4th	60	81	.426	31.5						
1980	FSL	South	5th	51	85	.375	31.5						
1981	FSL	South	5th	44	92	.324	38.0						
Miami Marlins
1982	FSL	South	5th	53	84	.387	31.5						
1983	FSL	South	5th	44	89	.336	34.0						
1984	FSL	South	5th	64	74	.464	15.5						
1985	FSL	South	4th	58	83	.411	19.5						
1986	FSL	South	3rd	74	66	.529	8.5						
1987	FSL	South	4th	44	89	.331	38.5						
1988	FSL	East	5th	27	40	.403	15.5	5th	28	39	.418	9.0	
Miami Miracle
1989	FSL	East	5th	16	53	.232	25.5	4th	27	38	.415	10.5	
1990	FSL	East	5th	15	54	.217	34.5	4th	29	39	.426	16	
1991	FSL	East	2nd	35	29	.547	6.5	4th	28	38	.424	13.5	
Fort Myers Miracle
1992	FSL	West	6th	22	47	.319	28	6th	24	38	.387	15.5	
1993	FSL	West	6th	27	39	.409	16	6th	28	40	.412	17	
1994	FSL	West	2nd	41	27	.603	3.5	6th	30	36	.455	12	
1995	FSL	West	6th	34	34	.500	6	1st ^	41	21	.661	—	Won semifinals (Tampa) 2–1; Lost finals (Daytona) 2–3 *
1996	FSL	West	4th	36	32	.529	7	2nd	43	26	.623	0.5	
1997	FSL	West	3rd	41	28	.594	1.5	2nd	40	30	.571	4	
1998	FSL	West	7th	30	39	.435	16	6th	35	34	.507	11	
1999	FSL	West	8th	25	44	.362	21	5th	35	35	.500	7	
2000	FSL	West	2nd	38	32	.543	2.5	1st ^	45	25	.643	—	Lost semifinals (Dunedin) 0–2
2001	FSL	West	4th	32	36	.471	3	3rd	36	33	.522	10.5	
2002	FSL	West	2nd	40	32	.556	3	2nd	37	30	.552	7.5	
2003	FSL	West	1st ^	44	26	.629	—	6th	29	37	.439	9	Lost semifinals (Dunedin) 1–2
2004	FSL	West	4th	31	37	.456	9	5th	30	37	.448	9	
2005	FSL	West	3rd	37	27	.578	6.5	3rd	37	32	.536	4.5	
2006	FSL	West	2nd	38	32	.543	—^{[a]}	1st ^	42	28	.600	—	Lost semifinals (Dunedin) 1–2
2007	FSL	West	5th	30	40	.429	13	4th	40	30	.571	4	
2008	FSL	West	1st ^	45	24	.652	—	3rd	32	35	.478	15.5	Won semifinals (Dunedin) 2–0; Lost finals (Daytona) 1–3
2009	FSL	South	1st ^	43	26	.623	—	1st ^	37	32	.536	—	Lost semifinals (Charlotte) 1–2
2010	FSL	South	5th	28	42	.400	15.5	2nd	36	32	.529	1	
2011	FSL	South	2nd	34	36	.486	4	5th	29	40	.420	16	
2012	FSL	South	5th	28	39	.418	20.5	4th	32	36	.471	7	
2013	FSL	South	1st ^	45	22	.672	—	4th	34	34	.500	5.5	Lost semifinals (Charlotte) 0–2
2014	FSL	South	1st ^	41	28	.594	—	2nd	41	29	.586	2	Won semifinals (Bradenton) 2–0; Won finals (Daytona) 3–1 †
2015	FSL	South	2nd	38	32	.543	7	3rd	38	31	.551	5.5	
2016	FSL	South	3rd	34	35	.493	4.5	3rd	36	33	.522	3.5	
2017	FSL	South	5th	33	35	.485	7.5	1st ^	42	25	.627	—	Lost semifinals (Palm Beach) 0–2
2018	FSL	South	5th	28	40	.412	13	1st ^	40	29	.580	—	Won semifinals (Palm Beach) 2–0; Won finals (Daytona) 3–1 †
2019	FSL	South	1st ^	39	27	.591	—	4th	35	32	.522	11	No playoffs^{[b]}
Fort Myers Mighty Mussels
2020	FSL	South											No season - COVID pandemic^{[b]}
2021	Low-A SE	West	3rd	60	54	.526	12.0						
2022	FSL	West	1st ^	41	23	.641	—	5th	28	36	.438	10.5	Lost semifinals (Dunedin) 1–2
2023	FSL	West	3rd	34	32	.515	10.5	4th	33	32	.508	10.5	
2024	FSL	West	4th	31	34	.477	11.5	2nd	35	25	.583	0.5	
2025	FSL	West	6th	27	37	.422	11.0	6th	25	36	.410	10.5	

- ^{a} The Miracle finished with the same record as the Dunedin Blue Jays, but since the Blue Jays had the better head-to-head record in the first half (4–2), the Miracle did not win the division.
- ^{b} The playoffs were canceled due to the impending threat from Hurricane Dorian.

Statistic	Wins	Losses	Win %
All-time regular season record (1989–2022)	2453	2,398	.506
Postseason record (1989–2022)	21	23	.477
All-time regular and postseason record	2,286	2,225	.505

== Media appearances ==
The Miracle's name and logo appeared in the 1998 film Major League: Back to the Minors. Gus Cantrell (Scott Bakula) pitched for the Miracle before retiring to become the manager of the Buzz.

== Roster ==
Fort Myers Mighty Mussels roster
Players		Coaches/Other
Pitchers: 41 Matt Barr; 46 Max Bayles; 32 Matthew Becker; 32 Tyler Bryan; 25 Thomas Burns; 50 Hendry Chivilli; 12 Matthew Dalquist; -- Jack Dougherty; -- James Ellwanger; 44 Adam Falinski; 37 Callan Fang; 1 Joel Garcia; 51 Eric Hammond; 22 Cristian Hernandez; -- Jake Hunter; -- Jace Kaminska; 46 Jui-Chieh Lin; 13 Rainer Marin; 38 Jake Murray; 45 Jason Reitz; 35 Melvin Rodriguez; 16 Brad Rudis; 27 Aidan Russell; 41 Jackson Sleeper; 22 Jonathan Stevens; 15 Brian Strange; 17 Ramiro Villanueva	Catchers: 38 Jimmy Keegan; 8 Hideki Prather; 33 Carson Tinney; Infielders: 11 Bryan Acuña; 24 Isaiah Lane; -- Shai Robinson; 4 Charlie Scholvin; 21 Colby Turner; 23 Quentin Young; Outfielders: -- Eduardo Beltre; 1 Yovanny Duran; 20 Bryce Fowler; 2 Merphy Hernandez; 5 Ricardo Paez; 9 Aidan Teel	Manager: 39 Jordan Smith; Coaches: 18 Dylan Hawley (pitching); 19 Carlos Lara (hitting); 26 Richard Salazar (pitching); 7-day injured list; * On Minnesota Twins 40-man roster; ~ Development list; # Rehab assignment; ∞ Reserve list; ‡ Restricted list; § Suspended list; † Temporarily inactive list; Roster updated November 2, 2026; Transactions; → More rosters: MiLB • Florida State League; → Minnesota Twins minor league players

== FSL All-Stars ==
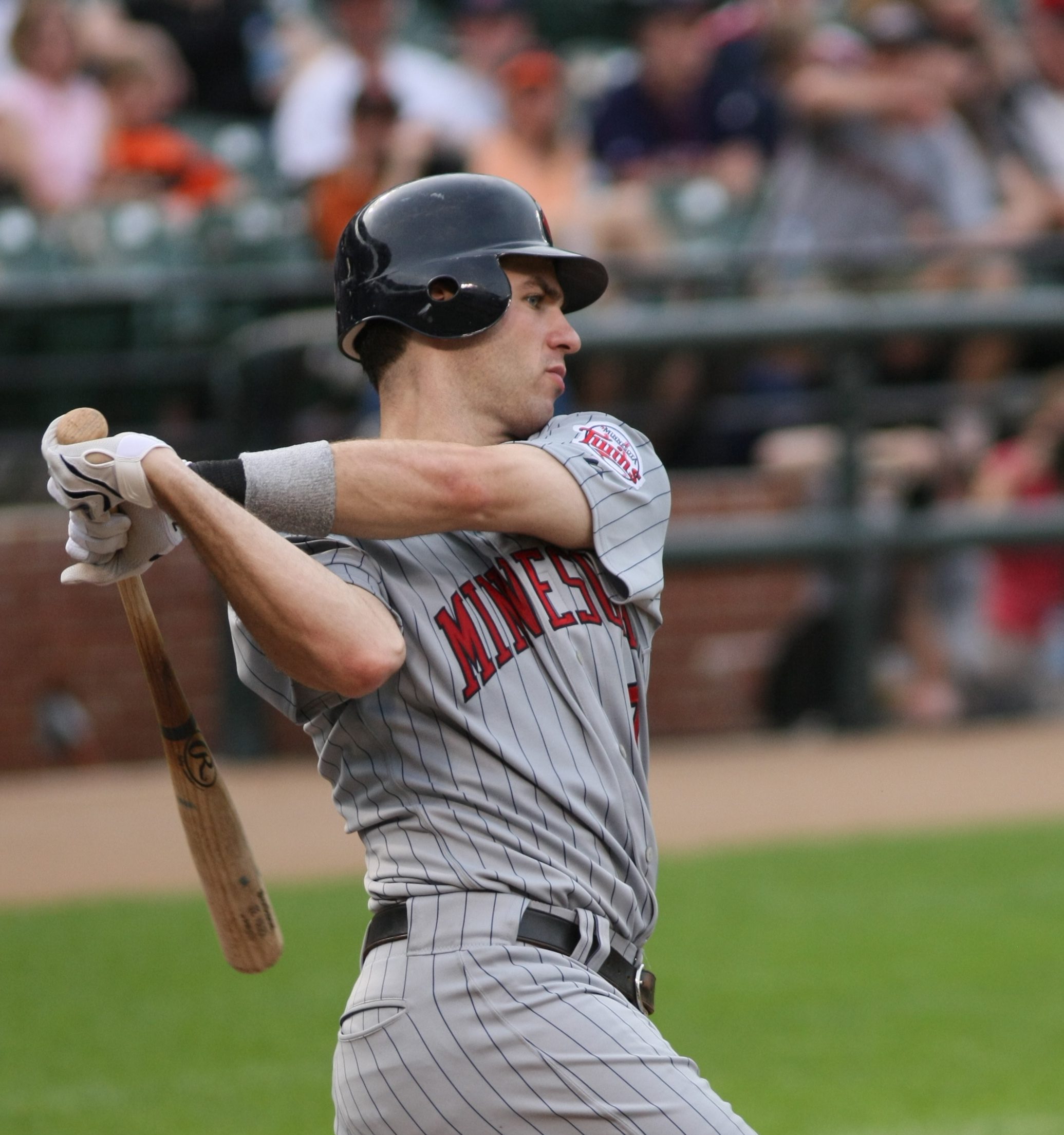
Joe Mauer was a 2003 FSL All-Star for the Fort Myers Miracle

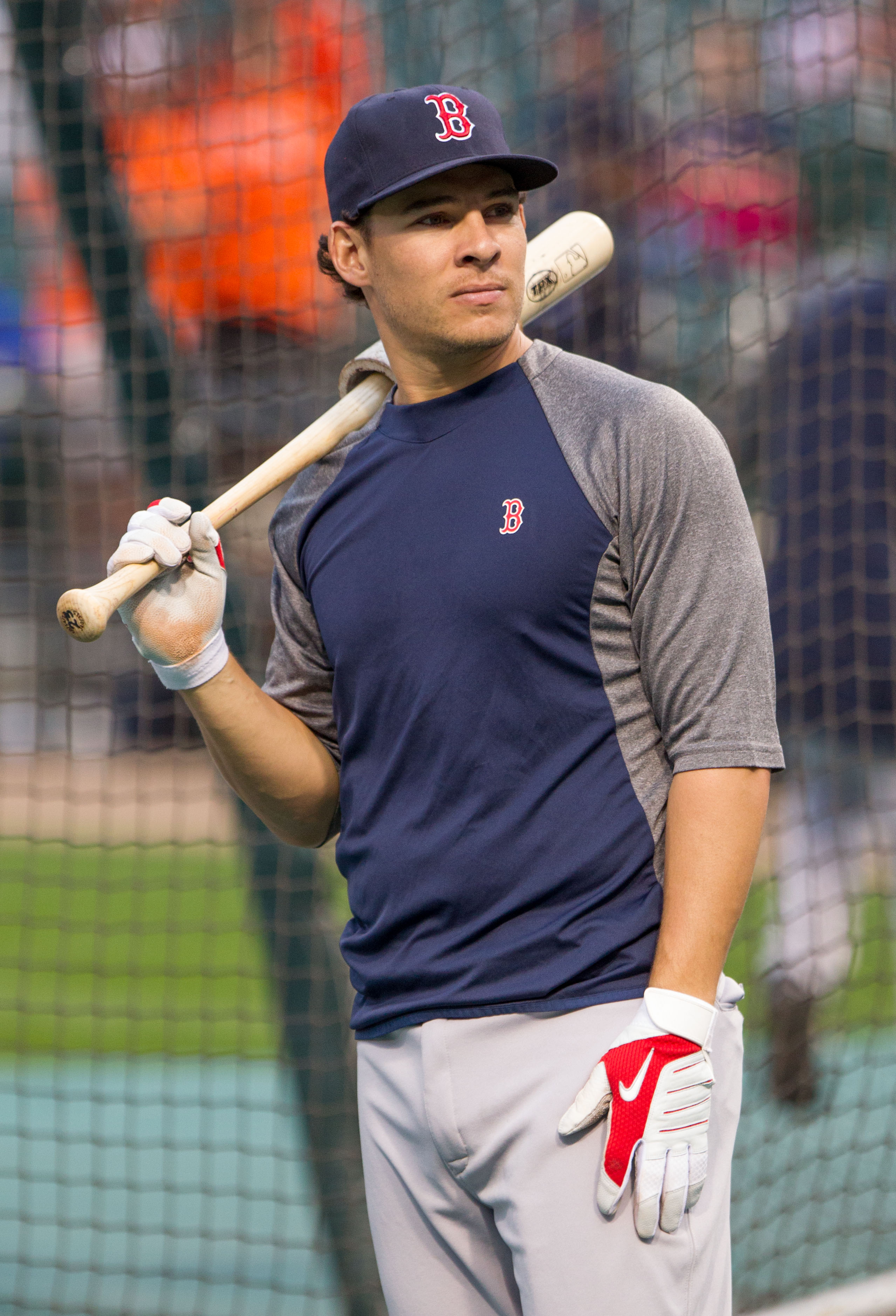
Danny Valencia

- 1992 – Troy Buckley, Brian Raabe
- 1993 – Brent Brede, Steve Hazlett†, Damian Miller
- 1994 – Gus Gandarillas, Andrew Kontorinis‡, Matt Lawton‡‡, Scott Moten, Chad Roper††
- 1995 – Shane Bowers
- 1996 – Mike Moriarty, Javier Valentín
- 1997 – Chad Allen, Phil Haigler, Jacque Jones, Brad Niedermaier, David Ortiz†† ‡‡, A. J. Pierzynski‡‡
- 1998 – Joe Mays, Chad Moeller, Tommy Peterman‡,
- 1999 – Matt LeCroy, Kyle Lohse
- 2000 – Brandon Masters, Juan Rincón, Saúl Rivera, Rubén Salazar, Brad Thomas††
- 2001 – Ronnie Corona, Juan Padilla
- 2002 – Beau Kemp, Josh Rabe, Matt Scanlon††
- 2003 – J.D. Durbin, Jason Kubel, Joe Mauer‡‡
- 2004 – Scott Baker††, Travis Bowyer††, Kaulana Kuhaulua, Francisco Liriano, José Morales, Justin Olson
- 2005 – Nick Blackburn, Matt Moses, Denard Span
- 2006 – Alexi Casilla, Matt Garza††, Kyle Geiger, Brandon Roberts, Kevin Slowey
- 2007 – Eddie Morlan, Ryan Mullins††, Oswaldo Sosa
- 2008 – Robert Delaney, Brian Dinkelman, Jeff Manship, Wilson Ramos, Anthony Slama, Rene Tosoni†, Danny Valencia
- 2009 – David Bromberg, Chris Cates, Carlos Gutierrez††, Steven Hirschfeld, Daniel Lehmann††, Chris Parmelee, Ben Revere, Steve Singleton, Spencer Steedley
- 2010 – Billy Bullock, Kyle Gibson††, Chris Herrmann, Yangervis Solarte††
- 2011 – Brian Dozier††, Bruce Pugh††, Danny Rams, Dakota Watts
- 2012 – Ricky Bowen, Pat Dean, Josmil Pinto, Daniel Santana
- 2013 – D.J. Baxendale††, Matt Koch, Zack Jones, Taylor Rogers, Miguel Sano††, Kennys Vargas, Corey Williams
- 2014 – José Berríos, David Hurlbut†, Brett Lee†, Adam Brett Walker‡
- 2015 – JT Chargois, Chih-Wei Hu, Brandon Peterson, Alex Swim
- 2016 – Edgar Corcino, Stephen Gonsalvez, Nick Gordon, Tyler Jay, Felix Jorge, Yorman Landa, Todd Van Steensel, Trey Vavra
- 2017 – Sam Clay, Max Murphy, Brian Navarreto, Chris Paul, Dereck Rodriguez
- 2018 – Travis Blankenhorn, Jaylen Davis, Taylor Grzelakowski, Jimmy Kerrigan, Andrew Vasquez
- 2019 – Lewin Diaz, Tom Hackimer, Ryan Jeffers, Trevor Larnach, Royce Lewis, Alex Phillips, Johan Quezada, Bryan Sammons
- MLB ended Minor League All Star games in 2021. Only postseason All Stars will be recognized.

† Injured & did not play
†† Promoted & did not play
‡ FSL All-Star Game MVP
‡‡ MLB All-Star

Former mascot Miss-A-Miracle poses for a picture with some young fans

== Notable franchise alumni ==
Baseball Hall of Fame franchise alumni

- Ferguson Jenkins (1962–1963) Inducted, 1991
- Eddie Murray (1974) Inducted, 2003
- Jim Palmer (1967–1968) Inducted, 1990
- Cal Ripken Jr. (1979) Inducted, 2007

Notable alumni

- Rick Aguilera (1996) 3× MLB All-Star
- John Altobelli (1985) longtime Orange Coast College coach
- Scott Baker (2004, 2008–2009, 2012)
- Don Baylor (1969) MLB All-Star; 1995 NL Manager of the Year; 1979 AL Most Valuable Player
- Jose Canseco (1982) 6× MLB All-Star; 1986 AL Rookie of the Year; 1988 AL Most Valuable Player
- Terry Crowley (1966–1967)
- Michael Cuddyer (1997) 2× MLB All-Star; 2013 NL Batting Title
- Storm Davis (1980)
- Mike Easler (1990, MGR) MLB All-Star
- Ed Farmer (1985) MLB All-Star
- Mike Flanagan (1973–1974) MLB All-Star; 1979 AL Cy Young Award
- Tim Foli (1985)
- Matt Garza (2006)
- LaTroy Hawkins (1994)
- Torii Hunter (1995–1996) 5× MLB All-Star
- Alex Johnson (1962) MLB All-Star; 1970 AL Batting Title
- Jimmy Johnston (1926)
- Jacque Jones (1997)
- Roberto Kelly (1997) 2× MLB All-Star
- Jason Kubel (2003, 2011)
- Matt Lawton (1994, 1999) 2× MLB All-Star
- Royce Lewis (2018-2019)
- Francisco Liriano (2004, 2008) MLB All-Star
- Kyle Lohse (1999)
- Dennis Martinez (1974, 1980, 1987) 4× MLB All-Star
- Joe Mauer (2003–2004, 2007, 2009, 2011) 6× MLB All-Star; 3× AL Batting Title (2006, 2008–2009); 2009 AL Most Valuable Player
- Doug Mientkiewicz (1995–1996)(2013–2014, MGR)
- Damian Miller (1993) MLB All-Star
- Eric Milton (2003) MLB All-Star
- Pat Neshek (2003–2004, 2010) 2× MLB All-Star
- Johnny Oates (1967) 1996 AL Manager of the Year
- David Ortiz (1997, 2001) 10× MLB All-Star; 2013 World Series Most Valuable Player
- Mike Pagliarulo (1992)
- Carl Pavano (2012) MLB All-Star
- Glen Perkins (2007, 2009, 2017) 3× MLB All-Star
- A. J. Pierzynski (1997) 2× MLB All-Star
- Nick Punto (2007)
- Brad Radke (1993, 2002) MLB All-Star
- J. C. Romero (1997, 2000)
- Miguel Sano (2013) MLB All-Star
- Benito Santiago (1983) 5× MLB All-Star; 1989 NL Rookie of the Year
- Bryn Smith (1975–1976)
- Denard Span (2005)
- Sammy Stewart (1976)
- Derrel Thomas (1985)
- Mike Torrez (1985)
- Todd Walker (1994)
- Rondell White (2007) MLB All-Star
- John Wockenfuss (1986)
- Chris Herrmann (2010–2011)
