= Jason Tyner =

American baseball player (born 1977)

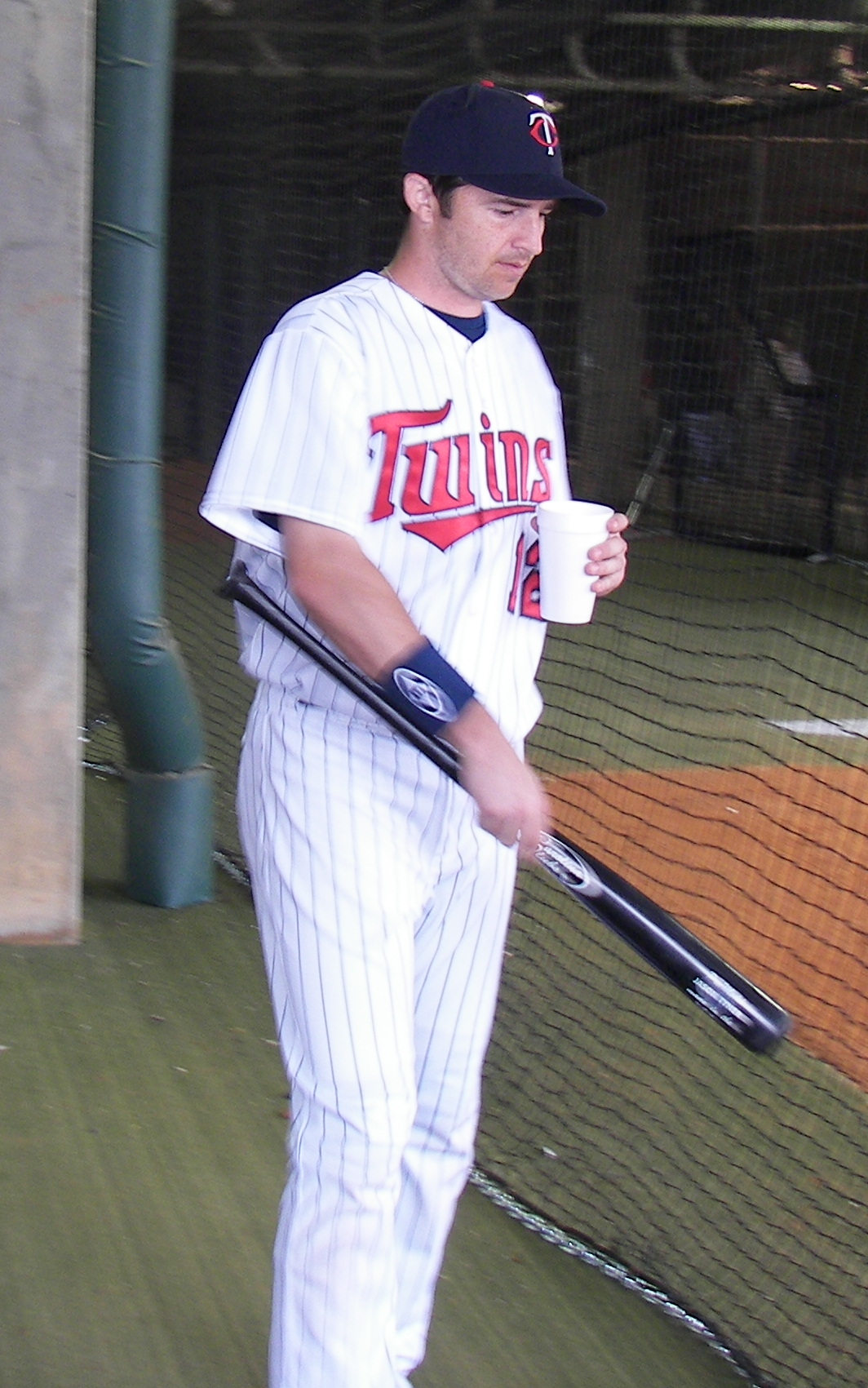
- Tyner with the Minnesota Twins
- Outfielder
- Born: April 23, 1977 (age 49); Bedford, Texas, U.S.
- Batted: Left Threw: Left

MLB debut
- June 5, 2000, for the New York Mets

Last MLB appearance
- May 12, 2008, for the Cleveland Indians

MLB statistics
- Batting average: .275
- Home runs: 1
- Runs batted in: 94
- Stats at Baseball Reference

Teams
- New York Mets (2000); Tampa Bay Devil Rays (2000–2003); Minnesota Twins (2005–2007); Cleveland Indians (2008)

Jason Renyt Tyner (born April 23, 1977) is an American former professional baseball outfielder. He played in Major League Baseball (MLB) for the New York Mets (2000), Tampa Bay Devil Rays (2000-2003), Minnesota Twins (2005-2007), and Cleveland Indians (2008). He batted and threw left-handed and played all three outfield spots, with the majority of his playing time coming in left field.

== College and high school ==
Tyner attended West Brook Senior High School in Beaumont, where he was named Beaumont Student Athlete of the Year and was a member of the National Honor Society as a junior and senior. Following high school, he attended Texas A&M University, graduating in 1998. At A&M, he was named All-Big 12 (along with Jason Jennings) and second team All-American in 1998. He finished his collegiate career first on A&M's all-time list for hits and stolen bases, was second in batting average, and third in at-bats. Making the feat even more remarkable was that he set the records in only three seasons. He also made the United States National Team in 1997.

=== New York Mets ===
Tyner was drafted in the first round (21st overall) of the 1998 Major League Baseball draft by the New York Mets. He signed with the team, earning a $1.07 million signing bonus. Tyner rose quickly through the Mets' minor league system, and was recalled by the Mets on June 5, 2000. He made his major league debut that day against the Baltimore Orioles, going 2-for-3 with a sacrifice hit and RBI in the 4–2 loss. He was optioned back to the Triple-A Norfolk Tides on June 26. In 13 games with the Mets, Tyner hit .195 with 5 RBI and a stolen base.

=== Tampa Bay Devil Rays ===
On July 28, 2000, Tyner was traded to the Tampa Bay Devil Rays along with pitcher Paul Wilson for pitcher Rick White and outfielder Bubba Trammell. Tyner played in 37 games with the Devil Rays after the trade, batting .241 with 8 RBI and six stolen bases in seven attempts.

In 2001, Tyner established himself as a good baserunner, collecting a then club record and personal career best 31 stolen bases. His bat, however, was not nearly as quick as his feet. He hit .280 with 111 hits, only 13 of which went for extra bases. These numbers along with 105 games, 396 at-bats, and 21 RBI are all career highs.

In a crowded Tampa Bay outfield, Tyner's lack of power and plate discipline cost him playing time in 2002 and cost him a job in the majors for 2003. He was the final out of Derek Lowe's no-hitter on April 27, 2002.

Tyner was noted for a failed promotional giveaway by the Devil Rays. The ballclub had arranged to honor him by presenting his bobblehead to the first 10,000 fans attending a game against the Oakland Athletics at Tropicana Field on June 2, 2002. The bobbleheads were never distributed because he had been demoted to the Durham Bulls five days prior on May 28. After sitting in storage for a while, they were given to the Pinellas County Education Foundation, who distributed them students in their business and commerce program.

=== Texas Rangers ===
On December 8, 2003, Tyner was claimed off waivers by the Texas Rangers. The Rangers released him on April 7, 2004.

=== Atlanta Braves ===
Tyner signed with the Atlanta Braves as a free agent on April 27, 2004. The Braves released him on July 25, 2004.

=== Cleveland Indians ===
Five days after his release from the Braves, Tyner signed with the Cleveland Indians. Tyner spent the entire 2004 season with two Triple-A teams, hitting .309 with a home run, 23 stolen bases and 32 RBI in 102 combined games.

=== Minnesota Twins ===
Tyner signed with the Minnesota Twins on November 15, 2004. He enjoyed a solid 2005 season with the Triple-A Rochester Red Wings, batting .286 with a home run, 18 stolen bases and 36 RBI in 133 games. On September 2, Tyner was selected to the active roster as part of the Twins' September call-ups. He batted .321, collecting 18 hits in 56 at bats with 5 RBI in 18 games.

On October 14, 2005, Tyner signed another minor league deal with Minnesota. Tyner returned to the Twins on July 14, 2006, due to injuries to outfielders Shannon Stewart and Jason Kubel. In his first game back that day, he hit a walk-off single to defeat the Cleveland Indians, 3–2.

Tyner's scrappy play, swift speed, and small ball mentality fit well with much of the Twins' mantra. Nicknamed "The Piranhas" by Chicago White Sox manager Ozzie Guillén, the Twins came to embrace the term as affirmation of their selfless, aggressive play. Formerly, Luis Castillo, who was traded to the New York Mets on July 30, 2007, Jason Bartlett, who was traded to the Tampa Bay Rays in late November 2007, and Nick Punto who left for the St. Louis Cardinals via free agency in 2011, were also known by that nickname. Tyner hit .312 with 18 RBI in 62 games with Minnesota in 2006. In the 2006 American League Division Series, he finished 0-for-6 with two walks and a stolen base in two games as the Twins went on to lose the series in a sweep to the Oakland Athletics.

Tyner finished the 2007 season batting .281 with a home run, 22 RBI and eight stolen bases in 114 games.

=== Cleveland Indians Again ===
On February 21, 2008, Tyner signed a minor league deal with the Cleveland Indians. On May 11, Tyner's contract was bought from the Triple-A Buffalo Bisons. Five days later, on May 16, Cleveland designated Tyner for assignment. The Indians released him on July 24.

=== Chicago White Sox ===
Tyner signed with the Chicago White Sox on July 26, 2008. He became a free agent at the end of the 2008 season.

=== Houston Astros ===
Tyner signed a minor league contract with the Houston Astros on January 16, 2009. He was released during spring training.

=== Milwaukee Brewers ===
Tyner signed a minor league contract with the Milwaukee Brewers in March 2009.

=== Detroit Tigers ===
On April 22, 2009, Tyner was traded to the Detroit Tigers. The Tigers released Tyner on June 15, 2009.

== The home run drought ==
Prior to 2004, Tyner had a severe home run drought until he hit one in a minor league game in Richmond in 2004.

Tyner finally hit his first (and only) major league home run against the Cleveland Indians on July 28, 2007, against Jake Westbrook. This home run came after 1,220 major league at bats in 390 career games and traveled 352 feet. At the time, Tyner had the longest home run drought in the major leagues. When he hit the home run, ex-teammate Luis Castillo took over the major league lead for a home run drought, not having hit one in 612 at-bats.

Of MLB players who made their debut in 2000 or later, Tyner has the most at bats with exactly one career home run.

== Personal life ==
Tyner is married to his high school sweetheart, Annie. The couple have three daughters; Payton, Presley and Parker. They also have a son, Reid.

Tyner awards $1,500 scholarships to southeast Texas scholar-athletes under the Juliet Tyner Memorial Scholarship Foundation. The foundation was created in honor of his mother, who died from breast cancer in 1998.

Along with former Pittsburgh Pirates minor leaguer Morgan Walker, Tyner operates the Southeast Texas Baseball Academy, which runs baseball programs for 8–12-year-olds.
