= Jason Bartlett (baseball) =

American baseball player (born 1979)

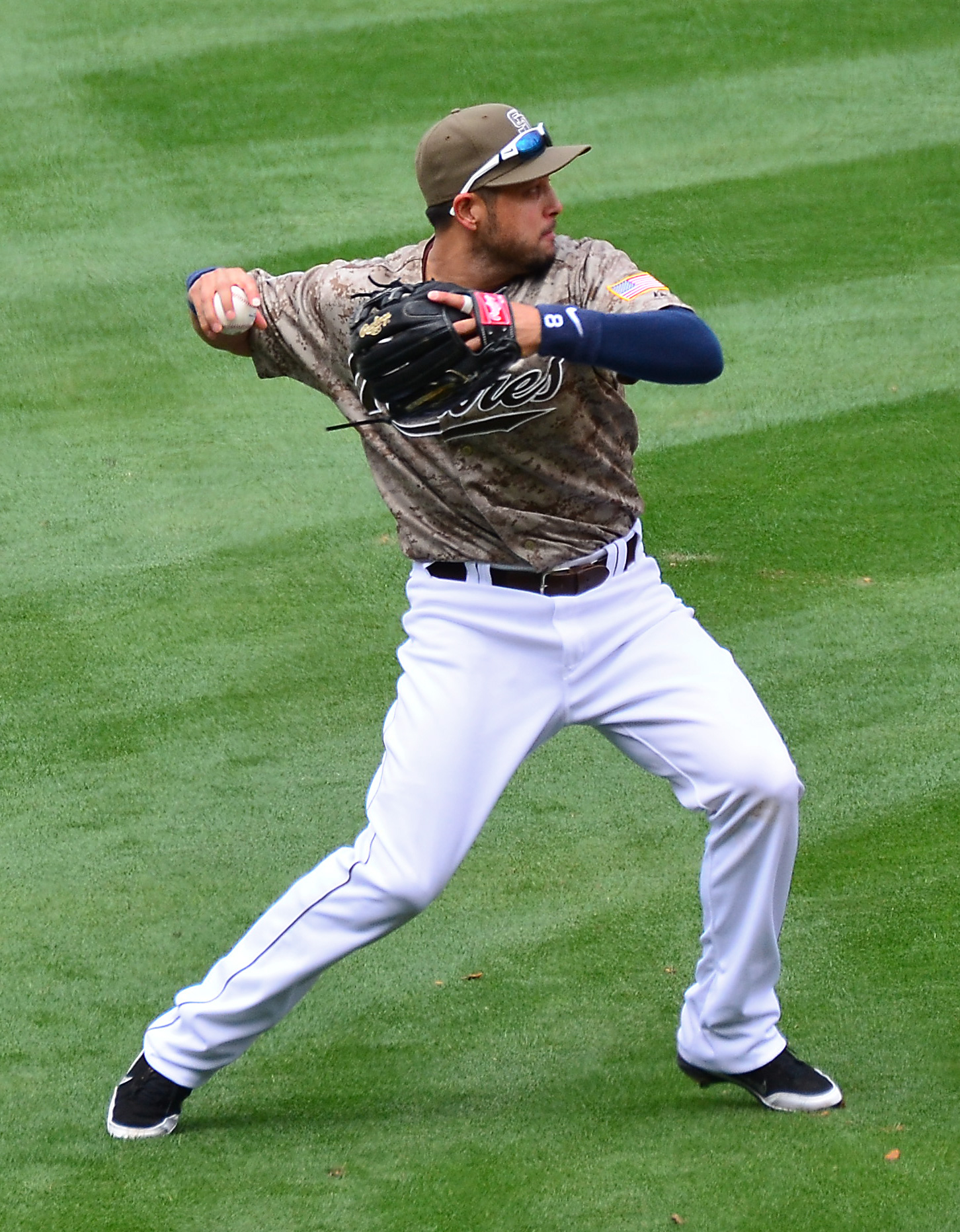
- Bartlett with the San Diego Padres
- Shortstop
- Born: October 30, 1979 (age 46); Mountain View, California, U.S.
- Batted: Right Threw: Right

MLB debut
- August 3, 2004, for the Minnesota Twins

Last MLB appearance
- April 6, 2014, for the Minnesota Twins

MLB statistics
- Batting average: .270
- Home runs: 31
- Runs batted in: 286
- Stats at Baseball Reference

Teams
- Minnesota Twins (2004–2007); Tampa Bay Rays (2008–2010); San Diego Padres (2011–2012); Minnesota Twins (2014)

Career highlights and awards
- All-Star (2009)

Jason Alan Bartlett (born October 30, 1979) is a Filipino American former professional baseball shortstop. He played in Major League Baseball (MLB) for the Minnesota Twins, Tampa Bay Rays, and San Diego Padres.

== Early life ==
Bartlett grew up in Lodi, California, and attended St. Mary's High School in Stockton, California. Bartlett went to San Joaquin Delta College and the University of Oklahoma, where he played for the Oklahoma Sooners baseball team. In 2000, he played collegiate summer baseball with the Harwich Mariners of the Cape Cod Baseball League and was named a league all-star.

== Professional career ==
Bartlett was drafted by the San Diego Padres in the 13th round (390th overall) of the 2001 Major League Baseball draft. In July 2002, he was traded to the Minnesota Twins for Brian Buchanan after the Padres had drafted shortstop Khalil Greene in the first round.

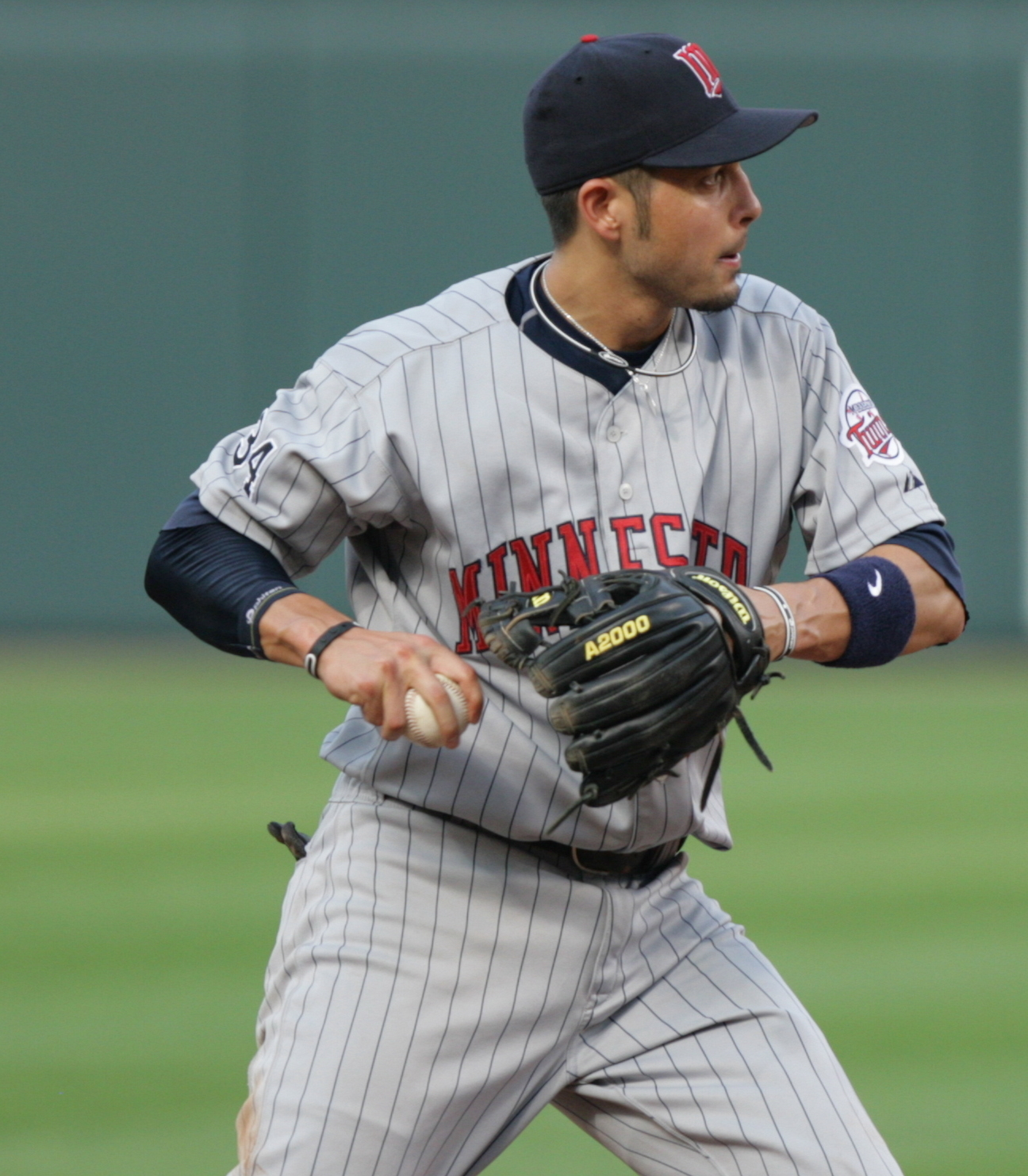
Bartlett playing for the Minnesota Twins in 2006.

Bartlett made his MLB debut on August 3, 2004. He recorded his first five-hit game in the Twins' 11-5 victory over the Kansas City Royals on August 6, 2006. When on the Twins, Bartlett was one of four players known for speed and small ball, nicknamed "the Piranhas" by Chicago White Sox manager Ozzie Guillén. The Twins embraced the term during the 2006 season. The other Piranhas were Jason Tyner, Luis Castillo, and Nick Punto.

In 2007, he led all major league shortstops in errors with 26. On November 28, 2007, the Twins traded Bartlett along with Matt Garza and Eduardo Morlan to the Tampa Bay Rays for Delmon Young, Jason Pridie, and Brendan Harris.

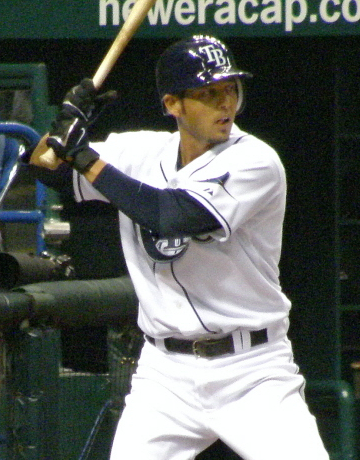
Bartlett batting for the Tampa Bay Rays in 2008.

On October 22, 2008, Bartlett stole a base in the fifth inning of Game 1 of the World Series, earning America a free taco from Taco Bell. Bartlett finished the season batting .286 with one home run, and was voted by local Tampa sportswriters as the Rays' MVP for the year.

On July 5, 2009, Bartlett was selected to represent Tampa Bay in the 2009 All Star Game. He finished the year batting .320, which was, at the time, the highest batting average in Rays history. On July 23 of the same year, against the Chicago White Sox, he grounded out to Alexei Ramírez for the final out of Mark Buehrle's perfect game. Bartlett had a 19-game hitting streak during the season, which would stay the longest hitting streak in Rays history until it was broken by Yandy Díaz in 2024.

Bartlett played in 135 games for the Rays in 2010 and posted a batting line of .254/.324/.350. On December 17, 2010, Bartlett was traded to the San Diego Padres for Adam Russell, Cesar Ramos, Brandon Gomes, and Cole Figueroa.

Bartlett was the Padres regular shortstop in 2011 and finished the season batting .245 with 2 home runs and 23 stolen bases. He had the lowest slugging percentage of all major league ballplayers with 512 or more plate appearances, at .307.

The Padres opened 2012 with Bartlett again as their everyday shortstop but he played his last game for the team on May 14, batting .133 with 4 RBI over 29 games. Three days later he was moved to the disabled list with a right knee strain. On the same day, his fellow middle infielder Orlando Hudson was released and the Padres brought up Everth Cabrera and Alexi Amarista in corresponding moves. On August 20, 2012, the Padres requested unconditional release waivers on Bartlett.

After sitting out the 2013 season, he signed a non roster contract with the Minnesota Twins on November 11, 2013. After playing in three games for the Twins, Bartlett retired on April 19, 2014.
