= Josh Rabe =

American baseball player (born 1978)

Quincy Hawks
- Outfielder / Coach / Athletic director
- Born: October 15, 1978 (age 47); Quincy, Illinois, U.S.
- Batted: Right Threw: Right

MLB debut
- July 17, 2006, for the Minnesota Twins

Last MLB appearance
- May 9, 2007, for the Minnesota Twins

MLB statistics
- Batting average: .250
- Home runs: 3
- Runs batted in: 9
- Stats at Baseball Reference

Teams
- Minnesota Twins (2006–2007)

Joshua Wayne Rabe (born October 15, 1978) is an American former Major League Baseball (MLB) outfielder with the Minnesota Twins and former head baseball coach for Quincy University in Quincy, Illinois. He is currently the athletic director for Quincy University.

== Quincy University ==
Rabe played baseball, basketball and football at Unity High School in Mendon, Illinois, where he later graduated. He'd received multiple college offers to play football and basketball, but the only school interested in him as a baseball player was Division II Quincy University, where he earned Great Lakes Valley Conference Freshman of the Year honors in 1998, and in 1999, was named to the All-Great Lakes Valley Conference team and was the GLVC Player of the Year. He's the school's all-time leader in hits (212), doubles (48) and runs (170). He's second all-time in home runs (32) and third in batting average (.377) and runs batted in (147). With Rabe, the Hawks were 104–54, made the NCAA Tournament in 1999 and won the GLVC title in 2000.

== Minor leagues ==
Rabe was drafted by the Twins in the eleventh round of the 2000 Major League Baseball draft. In his first professional season, Rabe batted .221 with a .977 fielding percentage for the Elizabethton Twins. A year later, with the Quad Cities River Bandits, he improved in both departments, batting .282 with six home runs and a .981 fielding percentage while playing all three outfield positions.

Rabe broke through in 2002 with the Fort Myers Miracle. In half a season in Fort Myers, he batted .340 with five home runs and 40 RBIs to be named to the Florida State League Western division All-Star team, and was promoted to the double A New Britain Rock Cats. In 2006, with the Rochester Red Wings, Rabe earned his third minor league All-Star nod, and a promotion up to the Twins. While with Rochester, he also volunteered his time at a clinics at Penfield Little League.

== Minnesota Twins ==
Rabe made his major league debut for the Twins on July 17, 2006, as a pinch runner for Jason Kubel in the eighth inning at the Hubert H. Humphrey Metrodome. He recorded his first Major League hit the following day against Edwin Jackson of the Tampa Bay Devil Rays.

Rabe recorded a three hit game July 27, 2006, against the Chicago White Sox, going 3-for-5 with three singles. Perhaps the finest game of his brief major league career occurred against the Detroit Tigers two days later, when Rabe went 2-for-3, hitting his first major league home run (a two run shot off Nate Robertson), and recorded four put outs in left field.

For the season, Rabe batted .286 with three home runs and seven RBIs. He started the 2007 season with the Twins, but a shoulder injury limited Rabe to only fourteen games, in which he batted .194 with no home runs and only two RBIs. He was released at the end of the season.

== Camden Riversharks ==
The Baltimore Orioles and Yomiuri Giants of the Japanese Baseball League both showed interest in Rabe, but he eventually ended up signing with the Camden Riversharks of the independent Atlantic League on March 31, 2008. He batted .361 with six home runs and thirty RBIs during his time with Camden before back injuries forced him into early retirement on June 24, 2008.
