= Nick Punto =

American baseball player (born 1977)

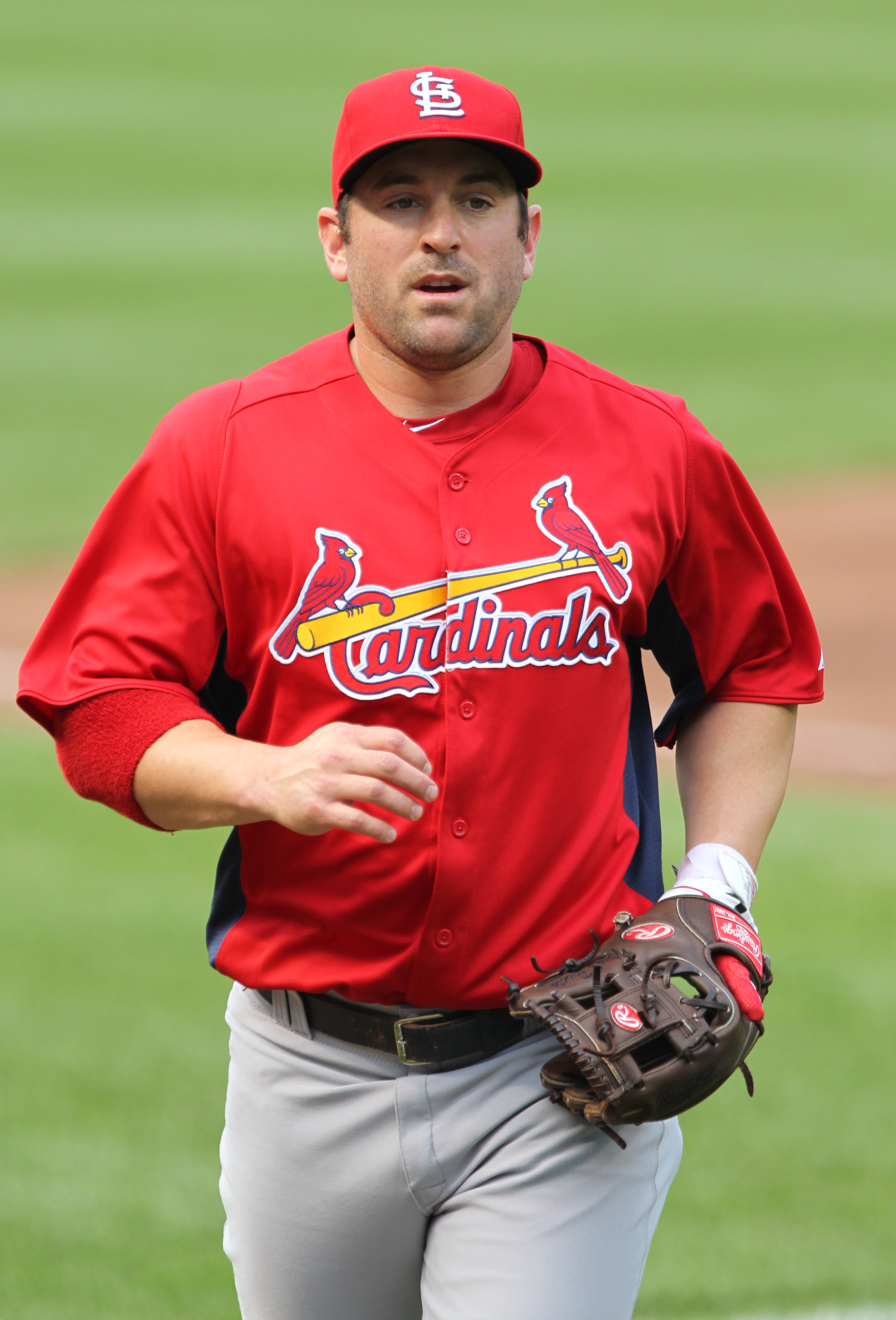
- Punto with the St. Louis Cardinals in 2011

San Diego Padres – No. 80
- Infielder / Coach
- Born: November 8, 1977 (age 49); San Diego, California, U.S.
- Batted: Switch Threw: Right

MLB debut
- September 9, 2001, for the Philadelphia Phillies

Last MLB appearance
- September 27, 2014, for the Oakland Athletics

MLB statistics
- Batting average: .245
- Home runs: 19
- Runs batted in: 263
- Stats at Baseball Reference

Teams
- As player: Philadelphia Phillies (2001–2003); Minnesota Twins (2004–2010); St. Louis Cardinals (2011); Boston Red Sox (2012); Los Angeles Dodgers (2012–2013); Oakland Athletics (2014); As coach: San Diego Padres (2025–present)

Career highlights and awards
- World Series champion (2011)

Nicholas Paul Punto (born November 8, 1977) is an American former professional baseball infielder and current coach for the San Diego Padres of Major League Baseball (MLB). He played in MLB for the Philadelphia Phillies, Minnesota Twins, St. Louis Cardinals, Boston Red Sox, Los Angeles Dodgers, and Oakland Athletics. With the Cardinals, he won the 2011 World Series over the Texas Rangers. He has also played for the Italian national baseball team in the World Baseball Classic.

== Playing career ==
=== Early career ===
Punto attended Trabuco Hills High School in Mission Viejo, California. He was drafted by the Minnesota Twins in the 33rd round (993rd overall) of the 1997 Major League Baseball draft, but did not sign. He stayed in Mission Viejo to attend Saddleback College before being drafted in the 21st round (614th overall) of the 1998 Major League Baseball draft by the Philadelphia Phillies. Punto played in the Phillies system for the Single-A Clearwater Phillies, Single-A Batavia Muckdogs, Double-A Reading Phillies and Triple-A Scranton/Wilkes-Barre Red Barons before his promotion to the majors.

=== Philadelphia Phillies (2001–2003) ===
Punto made his major league debut with the Philadelphia Phillies on September 9, 2001. He singled to right field off Bob Scanlan of the Montreal Expos as a pinch hitter in the eighth inning. He had two hits in five at-bats (.400) in just four games with the Phillies that season. In 2002 with the Scranton/Wilkes-Barre Red Barons, Punto played in 115 games and hit .271 with a home run, 29 RBI and 42 stolen bases, earning a selection as an International League All-Star.

In three years with the Phillies, Punto played in a total of 77 games and hit .223. His first, and only, home run with the Phillies was hit off Steve Trachsel of the New York Mets on July 10, 2003.

=== Minnesota Twins (2004–2010) ===
After playing in 64 major-league games in 2003, Punto was acquired by the Minnesota Twins on December 3, 2003, along with Carlos Silva and Bobby Korecky for Eric Milton. He started the season with the team, but he was injured twice and spent the majority of his time in 2004 on the disabled list. In 2005, he competed for the starting job at second base, which he eventually won, and in 2006 became the starting third baseman.

Punto was one of four Twins players nicknamed "the Piranhas" by then Chicago White Sox manager, Ozzie Guillén. The other Piranhas were Jason Tyner, Jason Bartlett, and Luis Castillo.

In 2005, Punto batted .239 with a career-high four home runs and 26 RBI in 112 games.

Punto had his best full season in Minnesota during the 2006 season when he batted .290 with a home run, 45 RBI and 17 stolen bases in 135 games.

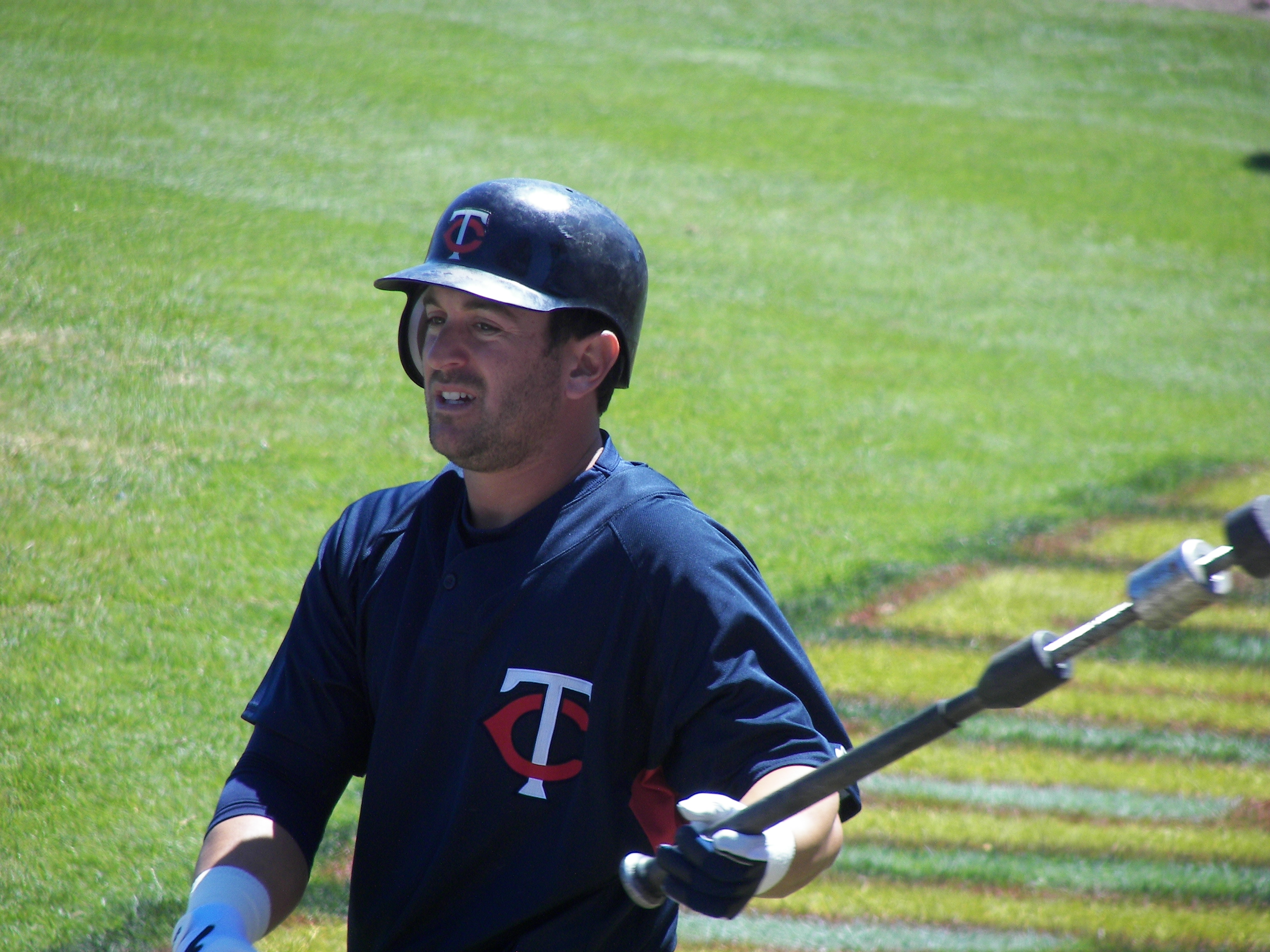
Punto with the Minnesota Twins in 2007

In 2007, Punto experienced his statistically worst full season with Minnesota, batting .210 with a home run and 25 RBI 150 games. He posted the lowest slugging percentage (.271) of any major league player with at least 200 at-bats in a single season. This was the lowest slugging percentage by a player with over 400 at-bats since José Lind recorded a .269 slugging percentage for the Pittsburgh Pirates in 1992. Punto also posted a −27.1 VORP in 2007, 8.5 runs worse than the second-worst position player in baseball, White Sox infielder Andy González. However, he has always played excellent defense and believed in his defensive abilities which the Twins are so keen on. On May 27 during an MPR broadcast Punto said, "I take too much pride in my defense to ever let (offensive struggles) affect me or affect my team. The one thing I can control is how I play defense."

After being injured most of the first half of the 2008 season, Punto was activated from the DL on June 25, 2008, and finished the season batting .284 with two home runs and 28 RBI in 99 games. Punto spent most of the 2008 season as the Twins' primary shortstop.

On December 11, 2008, Punto signed a two-year, $8.5 million deal with the Twins that included a club option for 2011 worth $5 million.

Punto represented Team Italy in the 2009 World Baseball Classic.

After struggling as the Twins regular shortstop in 2009, Punto began losing time in the lineup to fellow Twin Brendan Harris. After returning from the disabled list, Punto was re-inserted into the regular lineup at second base, following the struggles of infielders Alexi Casilla and Matt Tolbert. He finished the season batting .228 with a home run and 38 RBI in 125 games.

Punto began the 2010 season as the Twins' starting third baseman, but ended up on the disabled list before the end of April with a strained groin muscle. Punto returned to the lineup in May, playing at third base, shortstop, and second base as injuries cropped up among other players. In July, he was essentially replaced as the starter at third base by Danny Valencia, but he continued to play regularly due to injuries to Orlando Hudson and J. J. Hardy.

On October 29, the Twins declined Punto's $5 million team option, making him a free agent. In seven years with the Twins, Punto played in 747 games with a .248 batting average.

=== St. Louis Cardinals (2011) ===
On January 21, 2011, Punto signed a one-year contract with the St. Louis Cardinals worth $700,000. He played in 63 games with the Cardinals as a utility player, and hit .278 with a career high .388 on-base percentage, a home run and 20 RBI in 133 at bats. Punto had three hits in 14 at-bats (.214) with five walks in the 2011 World Series as the Cardinals defeated the Texas Rangers in seven games, giving Punto his first World Series ring.

=== Boston Red Sox (2012) ===
On December 14, 2011, Punto agreed to a two-year contract with the Boston Red Sox worth $3 million. In 65 games with the Red Sox in 2012, he hit .200 with a home run and 10 RBI while starting games at second base, third base and shortstop. He also appeared in five games at first base.

=== Los Angeles Dodgers (2012–2013) ===
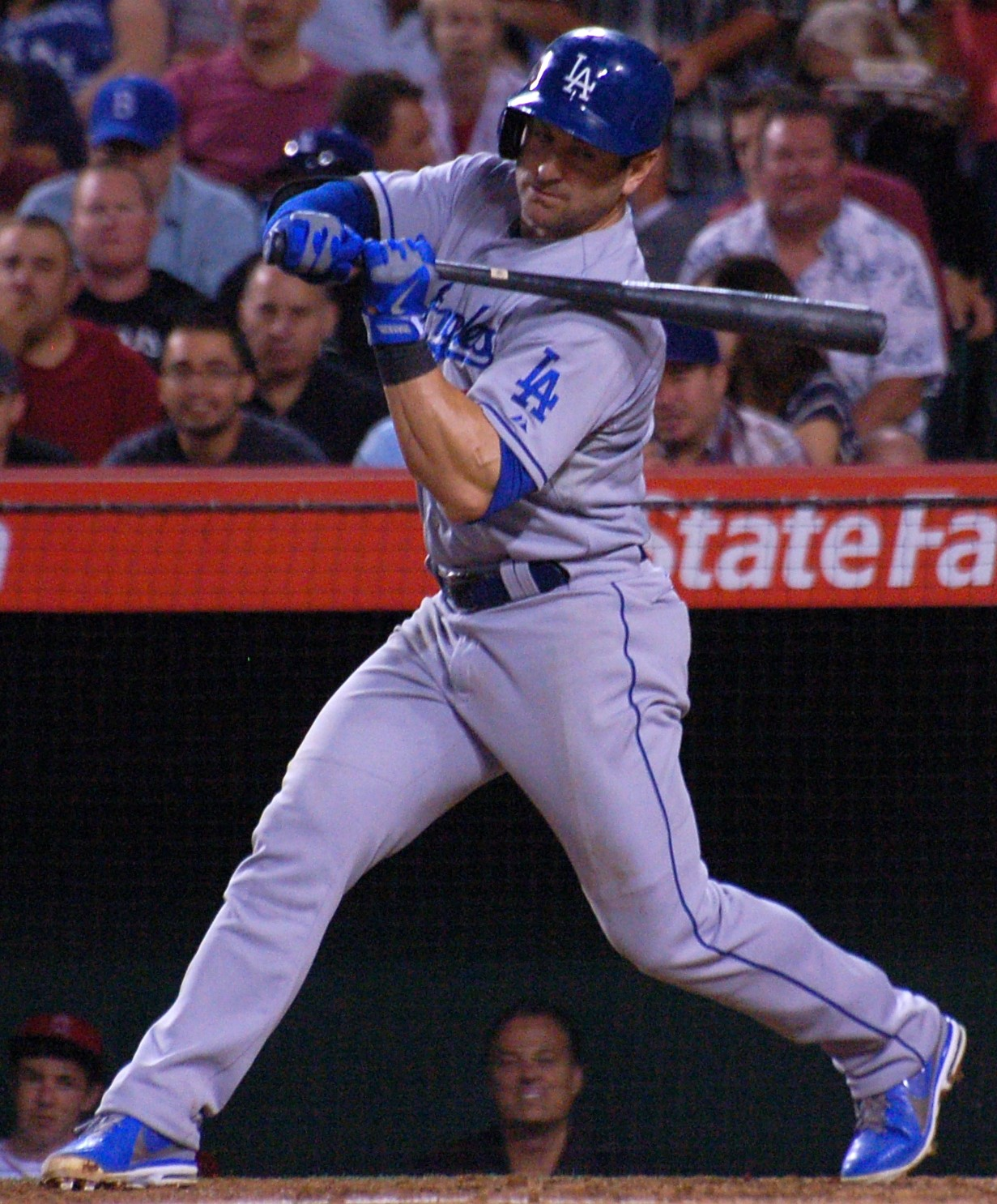
Punto with the Dodgers in 2013

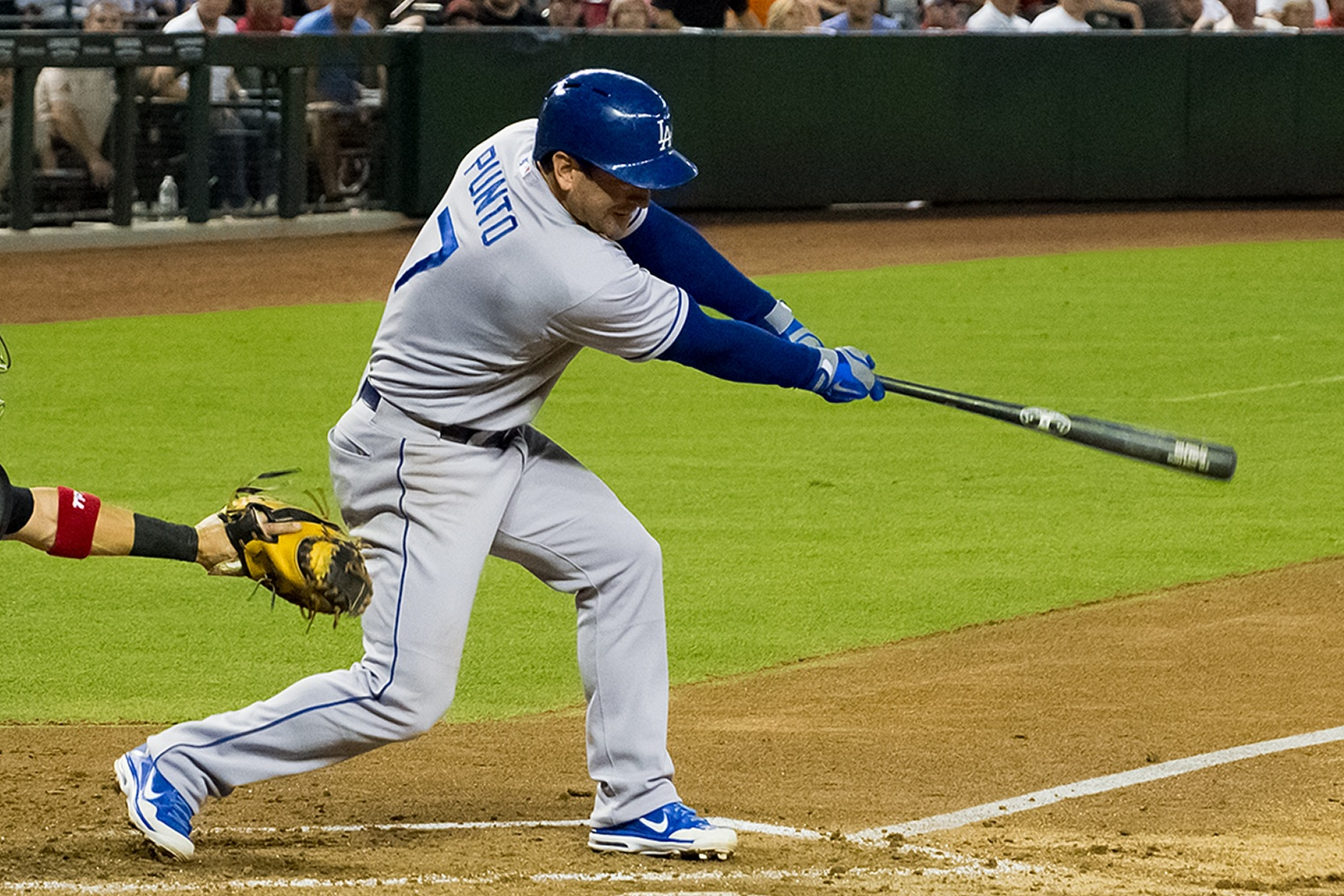
Punto with the Dodgers in 2013

On August 25, 2012, Punto was traded to the Los Angeles Dodgers (along with Josh Beckett, Carl Crawford and Adrián González and $11 million in cash) for James Loney, Iván DeJesús, Jr., Allen Webster and two players to be named later (Jerry Sands and Rubby De La Rosa). He appeared in 22 games with the Dodgers and hit .286. Due to the nature of the trade involving many high-profile and expensive players and highly-touted prospects, the trade has sometimes been ironically referred to as “The Nick Punto Trade”.

Punto represented Italy in the 2013 World Baseball Classic in March 2013. He hit .421 (8-for-19) in five games.

In the 2013 season, Punto saw extensive time at shortstop due to injuries to Hanley Ramírez. He appeared in 116 games, his most since 2009, and hit .255 with two home runs, 21 RBI and 34 runs.

On September 16, 2013, Punto led off a game against the Arizona Diamondbacks with a single to center field off of Trevor Cahill. Despite the fact that the ball traveled into the outfield, Punto made a headfirst slide into first base anyway.

=== Oakland Athletics (2014) ===
On November 13, 2013, Punto agreed to a one-year, $3 million contract with the Oakland Athletics, that included a vesting option for 2015. His numbers dropped off from the year before, as he hit just .207 with two home runs and 14 RBI in 73 games.

Punto's option for the 2015 season vested but the Athletics released him on December 19, 2014.

=== Arizona Diamondbacks ===
On January 7, 2015, Punto signed a minor league contract with the Arizona Diamondbacks that included an invitation to spring training. However, on February 20, Punto informed the Diamondbacks that he would not be reporting to spring training and would be taking the year off from baseball, though he was not officially retiring. He officially announced his retirement from baseball on February 18, 2016.

== Coaching career ==
On January 9, 2025, it was announced that Punto would be joining the major league coaching staff of the San Diego Padres. He was given the role of infield coach prior to the 2026 season.

== Honors ==
Punto was inducted into the Saddleback College Athletics Hall of Fame, joining notable former Saddleback and MLB players Tim Wallach and Mark Grace.

== Personal life ==
Punto and his wife, Natalie, have three children.
