= Michael Cuddyer =

American baseball player (born 1979)

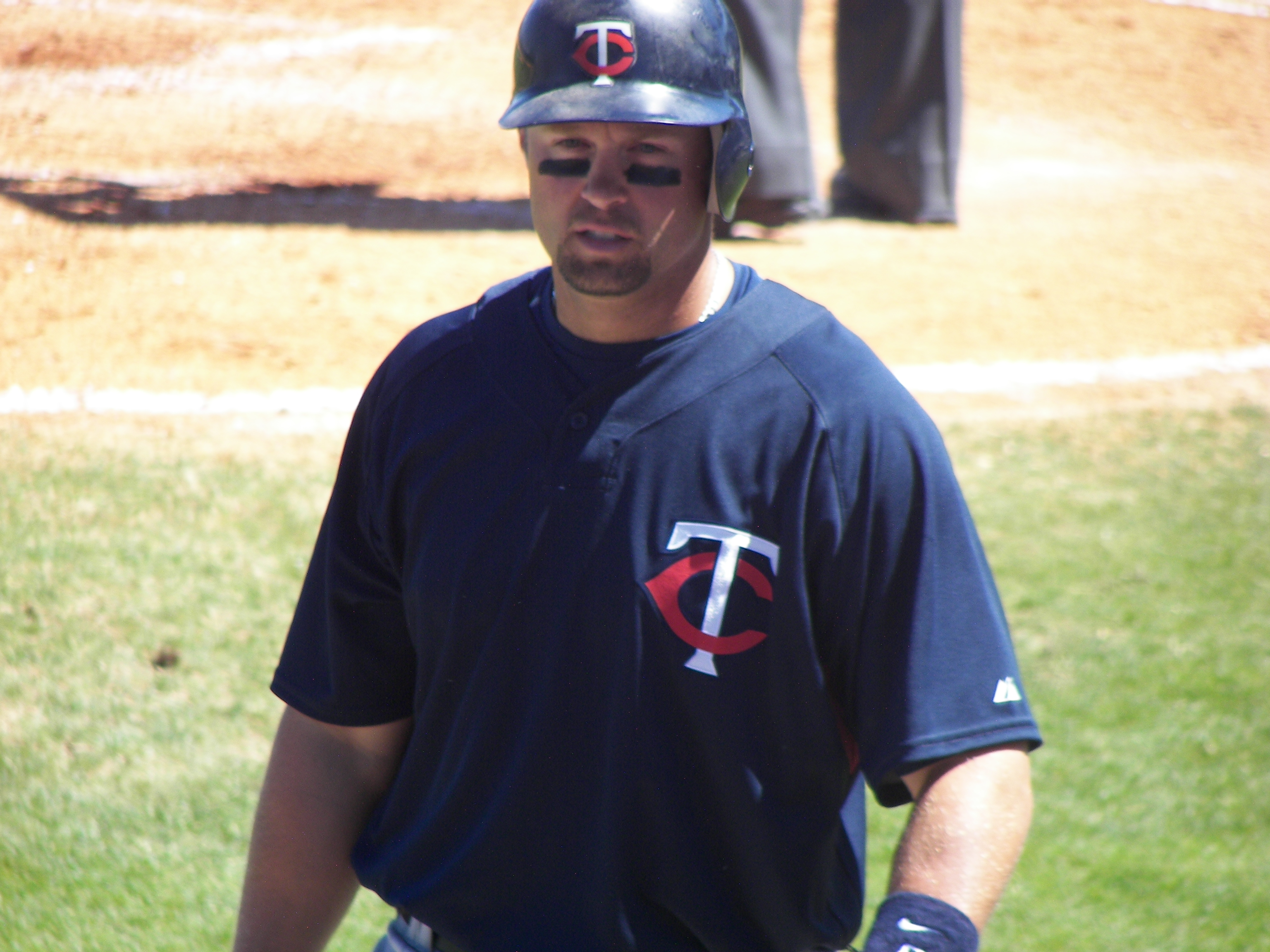
- Cuddyer with the Minnesota Twins in 2007
- Right fielder
- Born: March 27, 1979 (age 47); Norfolk, Virginia, U.S.
- Batted: Right Threw: Right

MLB debut
- September 23, 2001, for the Minnesota Twins

Last MLB appearance
- October 3, 2015, for the New York Mets

MLB statistics
- Batting average: .277
- Home runs: 197
- Runs batted in: 794
- Stats at Baseball Reference

Teams
- Minnesota Twins (2001–2011); Colorado Rockies (2012–2014); New York Mets (2015)

Career highlights and awards
- 2× All-Star (2011, 2013); Silver Slugger Award (2013); NL batting champion (2013); Minnesota Twins Hall of Fame
Medals
Men's baseball
Representing United States
World Junior Baseball Championship
Bronze medal – third place	1996 Sancti Spíritus	Team

Michael Brent Cuddyer (/kəˈdaɪər/; born March 27, 1979) is an American former professional baseball outfielder who played for 15 seasons in Major League Baseball (MLB) for the Minnesota Twins, Colorado Rockies, and New York Mets. He batted and threw right-handed. Cuddyer was a two-time MLB All-Star, and won a Silver Slugger Award in 2013, when he led the National League in batting average. Cuddyer announced his retirement after the 2015 season. He was inducted into the Minnesota Twins Hall of Fame on August 19, 2017. Primarily a right fielder, Cuddyer made starts at every defensive position except catcher and shortstop over the course of his career.

== Early life ==
Cuddyer was born in Norfolk, Virginia, and is a 1997 graduate of Great Bridge High School in Chesapeake, Virginia, where he was a standout athlete in baseball, basketball, and football as well as student body president and National Honor Society member. In 1996 and 1997, he was named to the United States national under-18 baseball team, where he played in the World Junior Baseball Championship. In 1997, he was named to the All-America First Team by the American Baseball Coaches Association and Rawlings. Cuddyer was named Virginia's Player of the Year and Gatorade National baseball Player of the Year in 1997. He was also a member of USA Today's All-Star and the USA Junior National teams in 1997.

During his high school career, he played American Legion Baseball and was named the 2014 American Legion Graduate of the Year.

Cuddyer has given back to his hometown and high school many times during his career.

== Professional career ==
Minor League miracle

Cuddyer was with the New Britain Rock Cats, a minor league affiliate of the Minnesota Twins on September 9, 2001 when he came to bat in the 9th inning with 2 outs and his team down 1 run and a runner on 1st, and he hit a walk-off homer to win the divisional playoff. His teammate Brad Thomas was scheduled to fly back to his hometown in Australia if they lost and his flight was already booked on American Airlines Flight 11, which was the 1st plane to crash into the World Trade Center on 9/11. Cuddyer's home run inadvertently saved Thomas' life.

=== Minnesota Twins ===
Cuddyer was drafted by the Minnesota Twins in the first round with the ninth overall pick of the 1997 Major League Baseball draft, but did not sign until August. Cuddyer initially committed to play college baseball at Florida State but waited for the Twins' signing bonus offer to increase from $700,000 to $1.3 million before deciding to go professional. Consequently, he did not make his professional debut until 1998 when he was assigned to the Fort Wayne Wizards in the Single-A Midwest League. Showing the tools that made him a first round draft pick and regularly named to the Baseball America's top minor league prospects, Cuddyer made steady progress through the Twins' minor league system and made his Major League Baseball debut on September 23, 2001, after hitting .301 with 30 home runs and 87 RBI in 141 games at Double-A New Britain. In his first career game, he went 1-for-2 with a walk in a 4–2 loss to the Cleveland Indians. After hitting .309 with 20 home runs and 53 RBI in 86 games at Triple-A Edmonton, Cuddyer would be called back up with the Twins for the 2002 stretch drive and would be named to the post-season roster where he would hit over .300 against the Oakland A's and the Anaheim Angels. Despite playing over half of his 676 minor league games at third base and another 166 games at second, prior to the 2004 season Cuddyer got most of his playing time as an occasional fill-in in the outfield. During 2004, Cuddyer started to see more time in the majors in the infield, playing second and third base. After the departure of veteran Twins third baseman Corey Koskie to the Toronto Blue Jays by way of free agency in 2005, Cuddyer became the Twins' starting third baseman. However, he struggled at third base and was relegated to a reserve role for much of 2005, although he did hit .263 with 12 home runs and 42 RBI in 125 games.

Cuddyer underwent surgery to repair a tear in his right lateral meniscus in October 2005. The Twins then extended his contract on January 21, 2006, giving him a one-year deal worth $1.3 million. After beginning the 2006 season on the bench, Cuddyer emerged as a regular in right field and in the cleanup spot of the Twins batting order. He finished the season batting .284 with 24 home runs and a career-high 109 RBI in 150 games. Cuddyer finished second on the Twins in RBI and third in home runs.

On January 25, 2008, Cuddyer re-signed with the Twins with a three-year $24 million contract, with a $10.5 million club option for 2011.

On April 4, 2008, Cuddyer dislocated his right index finger after sliding headfirst into third base. He also suffered a laceration on the knuckle after getting stepped on by Kansas City Royals left fielder Alex Gordon. He was put on the 15-day disabled list the next day, and was activated on April 25 against the Texas Rangers. On his second game after being activated, Cuddyer hit a three-run home run off Rangers' Scott Feldman, his first of the 2008 season.

On May 22, 2009, Cuddyer hit for the cycle in a game against the Milwaukee Brewers. Three months later, on August 23, 2009, Cuddyer hit two home runs in the same inning, the seventh inning of the Twins' game against the Kansas City Royals, becoming the 53rd player in Major League Baseball to accomplish this feat. He is the only player in major league history to have performed both offensive rarities in the same baseball season. During September and October 2009, Cuddyer moved back into the infield playing first base filling in for Justin Morneau. For the 2009 season, he batted .276 with a career-high 32 home runs and 94 RBI in 153 games.

Cuddyer returned to the outfield at the start of the 2010 season, but also found playing time at first and third base. He batted .271 with 14 home runs and 81 RBI in 157 games that season.

On July 3, 2011, Cuddyer was named an All-Star for the first time as a managers' pick. On July 25, Cuddyer became the first Twins position player to pitch in a game in 21 years when he was inserted in the eighth inning of a Twins loss against the Texas Rangers, in which they lost 20–6. The right-hander gave up a double to Mike Napoli, a bloop single to Mitch Moreland, and walked Ian Kinsler with one out to load the bases. Cuddyer then retired Elvis Andrus on a fly ball and David Murphy on a pop-up for a scoreless inning. The last Twins position player to pitch was outfielder John Moses against the California Angels on July 31, 1990.

=== Colorado Rockies ===
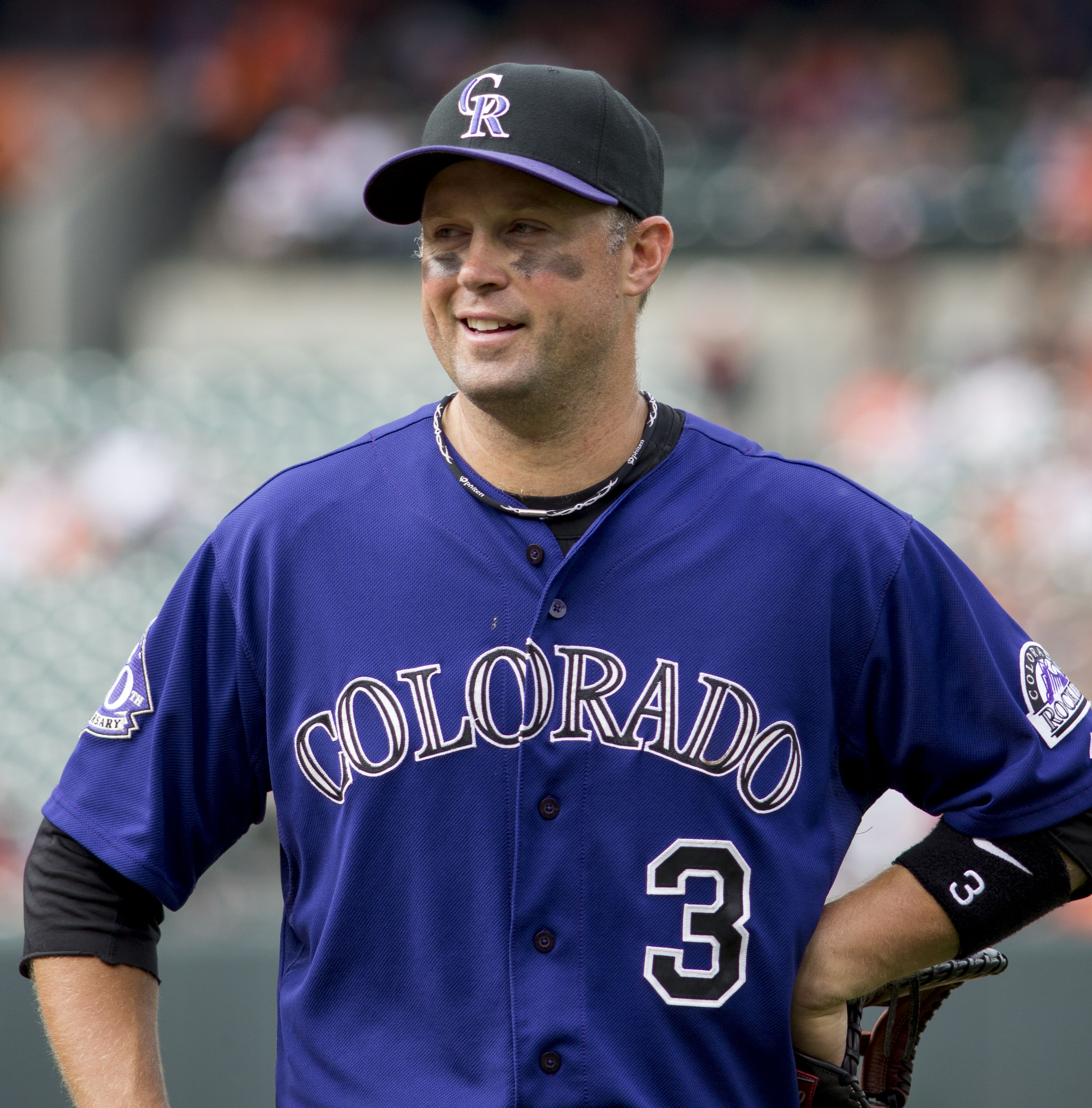
Cuddyer with the Colorado Rockies in 2013

On December 16, 2011, Cuddyer signed a three-year, $31.5 million deal with the Colorado Rockies. He chose to wear number 3 in order to honor Hall of Famer Harmon Killebrew, with whom he had grown close within the Twins organization before Killebrew's death.

In 2013, Cuddyer set a personal best with a 27-game hitting streak, the longest in Rockies history to that point. Cuddyer was also named an All-Star for the second time in his career. Cuddyer finished the 2013 regular season with a .331 batting average, 20 home runs and 84 RBI in 130 games. He won the National League batting title by 10 points over Atlanta's Chris Johnson, the first batting title of his career. Cuddyer had never hit above .300 in a season prior to winning the batting title; his previous career-high was .284.

On August 17, 2014, Cuddyer again hit for the cycle, becoming the 30th player to hit for the cycle more than once and just the third player in history, after John Olerud and Bob Watson, to hit for the cycle in both the American and National Leagues. Cuddyer was the only player to hit for the cycle during the 2014 season.

=== New York Mets ===
Cuddyer signed a two-year contract with the New York Mets on November 10, 2014, worth $21 million. On July 24, 2015, Cuddyer was put on the 15 day disabled list due to a bone bruise in his left knee. He was activated on August 10. In 117 games with the Mets in 2015, Cuddyer batted .259 with 10 home runs and 41 RBI. He appeared in the first World Series of his career, but the team would lose the series in five games to the Kansas City Royals.

On December 11, 2015, Cuddyer announced his retirement via an article on The Players' Tribune titled "Play Hard and Dream Big".

=== Career statistics ===
In 1,536 games over 15 seasons, Cuddyer posted a .277 batting average (1,522-for-5,488) with 809 runs, 333 doubles, 42 triples, 197 home runs, 794 RBI, 75 stolen bases, 527 bases on balls, .344 on-base percentage and .461 slugging percentage. He finished his career with a .986 fielding percentage playing at all three outfield positions and first, second and third base. In 28 postseason games, he hit .306 (26-for-85) with five runs, two home runs and 8 RBI.

== Coaching ==
On February 22, 2023, Cuddyer was named head manager of the United States national under-18 baseball team which he had played in 1996–1997, leading the current team for the U-18 Baseball World Cup in Tainan, Taiwan.

== Personal life ==
Michael is the son of Henry Cuddyer and Marcia Harris. He has a younger sister named Katie. He married Claudia Rente, an English teacher, on November 11, 2006. Their son was born on June 20, 2008, and fraternal twin daughters were born on December 6, 2011. They reside in Chesapeake, Virginia.

Due to a childhood virus, Cuddyer has been deaf in his left ear since he was 11 years old. However, he insists that his partial deafness has never interfered with his ability to hear teammates on the field and he does not view himself as hearing impaired.

== See also ==
- List of Major League Baseball players to hit for the cycle
- 2021 Baseball Hall of Fame balloting

Achievements
Preceded by Jason Kubel; Alex Ríos	Hitting for the cycle May 22, 2009; August 17, 2014	Succeeded by Melky Cabrera; Brock Holt
