= Jason Kubel =

American baseball player (born 1982)

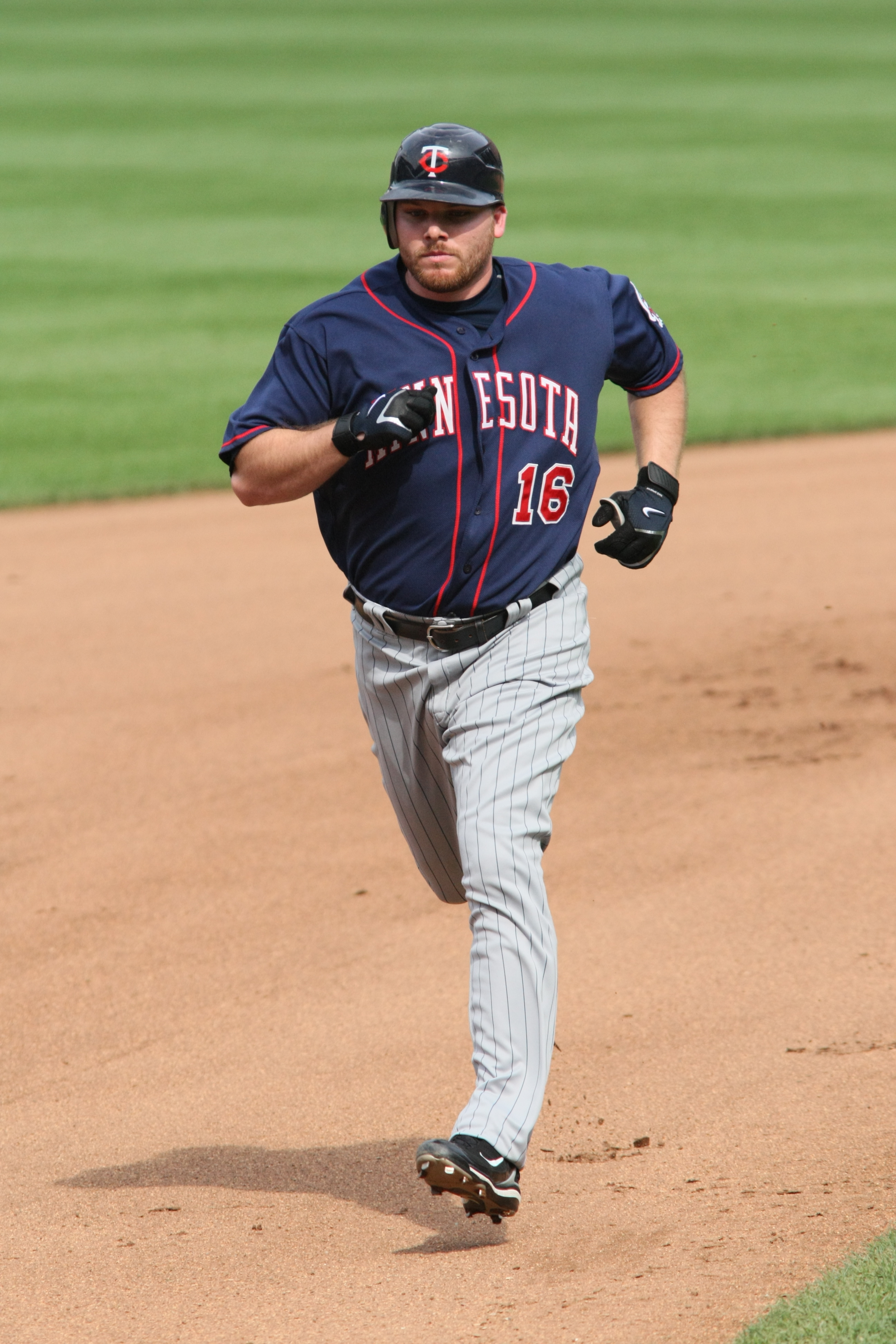
- Kubel with the Minnesota Twins
- Outfielder / Designated hitter
- Born: May 25, 1982 (age 44); Belle Fourche, South Dakota, U.S.
- Batted: Left Threw: Right

MLB debut
- August 31, 2004, for the Minnesota Twins

Last MLB appearance
- June 6, 2014, for the Minnesota Twins

MLB statistics
- Batting average: .262
- Home runs: 140
- Runs batted in: 564
- Stats at Baseball Reference

Teams
- Minnesota Twins (2004, 2006–2011); Arizona Diamondbacks (2012–2013); Cleveland Indians (2013); Minnesota Twins (2014)

Jason James Kubel (born May 25, 1982) is an American former professional baseball player. He played in Major League Baseball (MLB) for the Minnesota Twins, Arizona Diamondbacks, and Cleveland Indians.

== Early life ==
Kubel was born May 25, 1982, in Belle Fourche, South Dakota, to Myron and Debbie Kubel. His family moved to Palmdale, California, where he played baseball at Highland High School in Palmdale, California. Kubel had a .491 batting average during his sophomore and junior years at Highland. He was ranked the number 50 high school prospect by Baseball America. Kubel signed a letter of intent to play college baseball for the Long Beach State Dirtbags.

== Professional career ==
=== Minor leagues ===
The Minnesota Twins drafted Kubel in the 12th round (342nd overall) of the 2000 Major League Baseball draft. In 2004, Kubel played outfield in the Twins' minor league system, starting out with the Double-A New Britain Rock Cats, where Kubel batted .377 with six home runs and 29 RBI in 37 games before being promoted to the Twins' Triple-A affiliate, the Rochester Red Wings. He continued to excel with the Red Wings, posting a .343 average, 16 home runs and 71 RBI in 90 games. His impressive play landed him a place in the 2004 All-Star Futures Game. Kubel's play impressed manager Ron Gardenhire enough to warrant a call-up to the majors for the Twins' American League Central Division championship run in September. Kubel played well over the course of 23 games, batting .300 with two home runs and 7 RBI in 67 plate appearances.

Kubel suffered a serious knee injury in the Arizona Fall League later that year, which caused him to miss the entire 2005 season.

=== Minnesota Twins ===
Kubel's clutch June 13, 2006 grand slam.

Kubel returned to action in spring training 2006, made the Twins' Opening Day roster, and started in right field on Opening Day. However, he got off to a slow start at the plate, batting just .188 in his first seven games. On April 16, 2006, Kubel was optioned to Triple-A Rochester, and was replaced on the active roster by Rubén Sierra. Kubel returned to the Twins lineup on May 23, 2006, as a replacement for the injured Shannon Stewart. He hit well in his return, including a walk-off grand slam against the Boston Red Sox in the 12th inning at the Hubert H. Humphrey Metrodome on June 13, 2006. After that, continued soreness in his knees limited his playing time and success for the rest of the 2006 season. Kubel finished the season batting .241 with eight home runs and 26 RBI in 73 games.

Kubel's 2007 statistics showed improvement, as he finished the season with a .273 average, 13 home runs and 65 RBI in 128 games with 418 at-bats. On July 6, 2007, Kubel drove in a career high seven runs in a 20–14 victory over the Chicago White Sox.

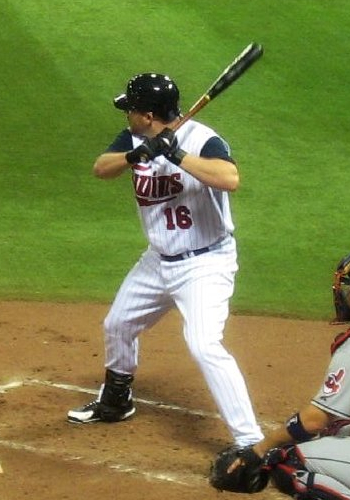
Kubel in a 2008 plate appearance at the Hubert H. Humphrey Metrodome.

During the 2008 season, Kubel primarily served as the designated hitter slot due to the acquisition of left fielder Delmon Young from the Tampa Bay Rays. Kubel hit well in the clutch and provided much needed power in the middle of the Twins' lineup. In 141 games, he batted .272 with 20 home runs and 78 RBI.

The 2009 season proved to be Kubel's most productive. On April 17, Kubel hit for the cycle against the Los Angeles Angels in the Metrodome. After a double in the first inning, single in the third, triple in the sixth, and strikeout in the seventh, Kubel capped the Twins' seven-run eighth inning with an upper deck grand slam to right-center field, which would prove decisive in the Twins' 11–9 victory. Kubel finished the game 4-for-5 with two runs scored and 5 RBI. On June 4, Kubel hit two three-run home runs in an 11–3 win over the Cleveland Indians, and hit another pair of three-run home runs to help defeat the Kansas City Royals on October 4. Kubel finished the season with career highs in batting average (.300), doubles (35), RBI (103), total bases (277), and OPS (.907), and games played (146). He also hit a then-career high 28 home runs in 514 at-bats. For his efforts, Kubel would be honored with a 24th-place finish in AL MVP voting that year.

Kubel played more often in the field for the Twins in 2010 due to a number of roster changes and injuries. Following the trade that sent center fielder Carlos Gómez to the Brewers for all-star shortstop J. J. Hardy, and the off-season acquisition of veteran slugger Jim Thome to fill the designated hitter position, Kubel found himself being used as a utility player and pinch hitter. However, due to the defensive shifting resulting from Justin Morneau's ongoing health issues, Kubel settled in as the Twins' right fielder, platooning with Michael Cuddyer. On April 12, Kubel hit the first home run in a regular-season game at Target Field, helping the Twins christen their new stadium in a 5–2 victory over the Boston Red Sox. On May 16, Kubel hit a grand slam off legendary closer Mariano Rivera to help the Twins beat the Yankees. It was only the fourth grand slam that Rivera had surrendered in his career.

Kubel started out the 2011 season hitting extremely well by peaking his batting average at .354 in May. This brought on speculation the Twins may try to trade Kubel to make room in an otherwise crowded team outfield. Due to injuries by fellow outfielders Delmon Young, Denard Span, and call-up Jason Repko, Kubel's position was critical to the Twins before finally getting hurt himself and missing all of the month of June. Kubel was limited to 99 games in 2011, batting .273 with 12 home runs and 58 RBI.

=== Arizona Diamondbacks ===
On December 19, 2011, Kubel signed a two-year, $15 million deal with an option for a third year with the Arizona Diamondbacks. For the 2012 season, Kubel served as the designated hitter during interleague play at American League ballparks. He played in 141 games with Arizona in 2012, batting .253 with a career-high 30 home runs and 90 RBI.

Kubel struggled to begin the 2013 season, batting just .220 with five home runs and 32 RBI in 89 games. The Diamondbacks designated him for assignment on August 27, 2013.

=== Cleveland Indians ===
The Diamondbacks traded Kubel to the Cleveland Indians for a player to be named later on August 30, 2013. He appeared in eight games with Cleveland, batting .167 (3-for-18).

The Indians declined their club option on Kubel's contract for the 2014 season on November 1, 2013, making Kubel a free agent.

=== Second stint with Twins ===
Kubel signed a minor league deal to return to the Twins on December 13, 2013. Kubel was designated for assignment on June 8, 2014, and released on June 16. Kubel ended his 2014 season with a .224 batting average, one home run, 13 RBI, and 59 strikeouts in 176 plate appearances.

== Personal life ==
Kubel is the brother-in-law of Michael Tonkin. They briefly played together for the Twins in 2014.

At the conclusion of his career as a professional baseball player, Kubel became a Little League coach.

== See also ==
- List of Major League Baseball players to hit for the cycle

Achievements
Preceded by Ian Kinsler	Hitting for the cycle April 17, 2009	Succeeded by Michael Cuddyer
