= 2008 Minnesota Twins season =

2008 Minnesota Twins
- League: American League
- Division: Central
- Ballpark: Hubert H. Humphrey Metrodome
- City: Minneapolis, Minnesota
- Record: 88–75 (.540)
- Divisional place: 2nd
- Owners: Carl Pohlad
- General managers: Bill Smith
- Managers: Ron Gardenhire
- Television: FSN North; WFTC (My 29) (Dick Bremer, Bert Blyleven)
- Radio: AM 1500 KSTP (John Gordon, Dan Gladden, Jack Morris, Kris Atteberry)
- Stats: ESPN.com; Baseball Reference

The 2008 Minnesota Twins season was the 48th season for the franchise in Minnesota, and the 108th overall in the American League. After tying the Chicago White Sox for first in the American League Central with an 88–74 record, the team lost a one game playoff to finish second and miss the league playoffs.

== Offseason and spring training ==
=== Player and personnel moves ===
General Manager for the previous 13 years, Terry Ryan stepped down into the role of Senior Advisor in September 2007 and was replaced by Bill Smith, formerly the assistant general manager. Scouting director Mike Radcliff was named vice president of player personnel and director of baseball operations Rob Antony was named assistant GM.

The offseason between the 2007 and 2008 seasons saw many rumors surrounding pitcher Johan Santana, but little action until shortly before the start of spring training. Typically standing still in the off-season, the Twins made some waves late November when they traded Matt Garza, Jason Bartlett and Eduardo Morlan to the Tampa Bay Rays for power-hitting outfielder Delmon Young, scrappy infielder Brendan Harris and former Twin Jason Pridie.

Prior to the Rays trade, the Twins traded for outfielder Craig Monroe of the Chicago Cubs. Monroe would later sign with the Twins and would be placed on the major league roster soon after. Monroe joined several others including Adam Everett and Mike Lamb as those new to the team who made the 2008 Opening Day roster.

On January 18, 2008, the Twins avoided arbitration with three current players: Jason Kubel, Justin Morneau and Juan Rincón. Rincón and Kubel were signed through 2008, while Morneau and Michael Cuddyer were signed to extended contracts.

The Twins also saw several players depart via free agency, roster management and trade. The Twins also released players Jason Tyner, Chris Heintz, Lew Ford, Josh Rabe and Matthew LeCroy.

Minnesota lost Carlos Silva via free agency, Silva signing with the Seattle Mariners for a four-year contract. Silva was a starting pitcher for the Twins in recent years after coming over in the Eric Milton trade.

The Twins also lost perennial Gold Glove center fielder and fan favorite Torii Hunter to free agency, who signed with the Los Angeles Angels of Anaheim for five years and $90 million.

The Twins traded ace Johan Santana to the New York Mets for four prospects: outfielder Carlos Gómez and pitchers Kevin Mulvey, Philip Humber and Deolis Guerra.

=== Spring training ===
The Twins, as per long-standing tradition, were the last team to begin spring training on February 17, 2008.

On March 27, the Twins announced they had finished signing their entire 40-man roster.

Pitcher Francisco Liriano was unable to report to camp on time due to visa problems. Shortly before the start of the season, Liriano was sent down to the minor leagues to continue his development.

Gómez beat out center field prospects Denard Span and Jason Pridie for the starting job.

The team re-signed closer Joe Nathan to a four-year contract on March 24.

== Regular season ==
=== Notable events ===
On May 7, 2008, Carlos Gómez hit for the cycle against the Chicago White Sox at U.S. Cellular Field in Chicago. He became the ninth major leaguer in history to hit for the reverse natural cycle. He also became the third-youngest player to hit for the cycle in MLB history. It had been a spell of 22 years since the last Twin hit for the cycle, Kirby Puckett in 1986.

On May 19, Bobby Korecky—with a single in the tenth inning—became the only Twins pitcher to get a hit in the Metrodome (1982–2009).

In the third inning of the June 15 game against the Milwaukee Brewers, Scott Baker became the first Minnesota Twin to strike out four men in a single inning. After Ryan Braun struck out, Prince Fielder struck out swinging at a wild pitch and made it to first base. Baker then struck out Russell Branyan and Mike Cameron to end the inning. Baker is the eighth American League pitcher to strike out the four consecutively. In 2012, Francisco Liriano will become the second Twin to accomplish the feat.

During the 2008 campaign, the Twins sent three representatives to the 2008 MLB All Star game: Joe Mauer, Justin Morneau and Joe Nathan. Morneau went on to win the home run derby and score the winning run in the 15th inning of the All-Star game.

Joe Mauer won his second American League batting title with a .328 average. Justin Morneau set a new club record with 47 doubles, and led the major leagues playing in 163 games. Carlos Gómez topped Rod Carew's 1974 team record with 30 bunt singles (Carew had 29), a total which led the majors.

Joe Mauer and Justin Morneau both won Silver Slugger Awards; Mauer added a Gold Glove Award as well.

=== Season standings ===
AL Central
Team	W	L	Pct.	GB	Home	Road
Chicago White Sox	89	74	.546	—	54‍–‍28	35‍–‍46
Minnesota Twins	88	75	.540	1	53‍–‍28	35‍–‍47
Cleveland Indians	81	81	.500	7½	45‍–‍36	36‍–‍45
Kansas City Royals	75	87	.463	13½	38‍–‍43	37‍–‍44
Detroit Tigers	74	88	.457	14½	40‍–‍41	34‍–‍47

=== Record vs. opponents ===
2008 American League record Source: MLB Standings Grid – 2008
Team	BAL	BOS	CWS	CLE	DET	KC	LAA	MIN	NYY	OAK	SEA	TB	TEX	TOR	NL
Baltimore	–	6–12	4–5	4–4	4–3	5–3	3–6	3–3	7–11	0–5	8–2	3–15	4–5	6–12	11–7
Boston	12–6	–	4–3	5–1	5–2	6–1	1–8	4–3	9–9	6–4	6–3	8–10	9–1	9–9	11–7
Chicago	5–4	3–4	–	11–7	12–6	12–6	5–5	9–10	2–5	5–4	5–1	4–6	3–3	1–7	12–6
Cleveland	4–4	1–5	7–11	–	11–7	10–8	4–5	8–10	4–3	5–4	4–5	5–2	6–4	6–1	6–12
Detroit	3–4	2–5	6–12	7–11	–	7–11	3–6	7–11	4–2	3–6	7–3	3–4	6–3	3–5	13–5
Kansas City	3–5	1–6	6–12	8–10	11–7	–	2–3	6–12	5–5	6–3	7–2	3–5	2–7	2–5	13–5
Los Angeles	6–3	8–1	5–5	5–4	6–3	3–2	–	5–3	7–3	10–9	14–5	3–6	12–7	6–3	10–8
Minnesota	3–3	3–4	10–9	10–8	11–7	12–6	3–5	–	4–6	5–5	5–4	3–3	5–5	0–6	14–4
New York	11–7	9–9	5–2	3–4	2–4	5–5	3–7	6–4	–	5–1	7–2	11–7	3–4	9–9	10–8
Oakland	5–0	4–6	4–5	4–5	6–3	3–6	9–10	5–5	1–5	-	10–9	3–6	7–12	4–6	10–8
Seattle	2–8	3–6	1–5	5–4	3–7	2–7	5–14	4–5	2–7	9–10	–	3–4	8–11	5–4	9–9
Tampa Bay	15–3	10–8	6–4	2–5	4–3	5–3	6–3	3–3	7–11	6–3	4–3	–	6–3	11–7	12–6
Texas	5–4	1–9	3–3	4–6	3–6	7–2	7–12	5–5	4–3	12–7	11–8	3–6	–	4–4	10–8
Toronto	12–6	9–9	7–1	1–6	5–3	5–2	3–6	6–0	9–9	6–4	4–5	7–11	4–4	–	8–10

=== Game log ===
2008 game log
March/April: 13–14

#	Date	Opponent	Score	Win	Loss	Save	Attendance	Record
1	March 31	Angels	3–2	Hernández (1–0)	Weaver (0–1)	Nathan (1)	49,596	1–0
2	April 1	Angels	9–1	Garland (1–0)	Bonser (0–1)		24,586	1–1
3	April 2	Angels	1–0	Saunders (1–0)	Blackburn (0–1)	Rodríguez (1)	21,932	1–2
4	April 3	Angels	5–4	Santana (1–0)	Slowey (0–1)	Rodríguez (2)	17,084	1–3
5	April 4	Royals	4–3	Baker (1–0)	Bale (0–1)	Nathan (2)	21,847	2–3
6	April 5	Royals	6–4	Hernández (2–0)	Meche (0–1)	Nathan (3)	21,262	3–3
7	April 6	Royals	3–1	Tomko (1–0)	Bonser (0–2)	Soria (3)	21,765	3–4
8	April 7	@ White Sox	7–4	Vázquez (1–1)	Guerrier (0–1)	Jenks (4)	38,082	3–5
9	April 9	@ White Sox	12–5	Baker (2–0)	Danks (0–1)	Bass (1)	16,499	4–5
--	April 10	@ White Sox	Postponed (rain) Rescheduled for June 9					
10	April 11	@ Royals	5–0	Hernández (3–0)	Meche (0–2)		16,691	5–5
11	April 12	@ Royals	2–0	Bonser (1–2)	Tomko (1–1)	Nathan (4)	36,300	6–5
12	April 13	@ Royals	5–1	Bannister (3–0)	Liriano (0–1)		13,886	6–6
13	April 14	@ Tigers	11–9	Beltrán (1–0)	Neshek (0–1)	Jones (2)	32,002	6–7
14	April 15	@ Tigers	6–5	Rapada (1–0)	Crain (0–1)	Jones (3)	30,901	6–8
15	April 16	Rays	6–5	Rincón (1–0)	Wheeler (0–2)	Nathan (5)	20,209	7–8
16	April 17	Rays	7–3	Hammel (1–1)	Bonser (1–3)	Howell (1)	14,781	7–9
17	April 18	Indians	4–0	Lee (3–0)	Liriano (0–2)		22,366	7–10
18	April 19	Indians	3–0	Blackburn (1–1)	Westbrook (1–2)	Nathan (6)	34,210	8–10
19	April 20	Indians	2–1 (10)	Guerrier (1–1)	Pérez (0–1)		27,703	9–10
20	April 22	@ Athletics	5–4	Rincón (2–0)	Blanton (1–4)	Nathan (7)	10,267	10–10
21	April 23	@ Athletics	3–0	Gaudin (2–1)	Bonser (1–4)	Street (6)	15,242	10–11
22	April 24	@ Athletics	11–2	Smith (2–0)	Liriano (0–3)		12,593	10–12
23	April 25	@ Rangers	6–5 (10)	Benoit (2–1)	Rincón (2–1)		19,016	10–13
24	April 26	@ Rangers	12–6	Reyes (1–0)	Wright (1–1)		33,053	11–13
25	April 27	@ Rangers	10–0	Padilla (3–2)	Hernández (3–1)		19,911	11–14
26	April 29	White Sox	3–1	Bonser (2–4)	Floyd (2–1)	Nathan (8)	20,891	12–14
27	April 30	White Sox	4–3	Blackburn (2–1)	Wassermann (0–1)	Nathan (9)	19,137	13–14

May: 15–13

#	Date	Opponent	Score	Win	Loss	Save	Attendance	Record
28	May 2	Tigers	11–1	Hernández (4–1)	Galarraga (2–1)		33,628	14–14
29	May 3	Tigers	4–1	Bass (1–0)	Verlander (1–5)	Nathan (10)	28,985	15–14
30	May 4	Tigers	7–6	Guerrier (2–1)	Miner (1–2)	Nathan (11)	29,821	16–14
31	May 6	@ White Sox	7–1	Floyd (3–1)	Blackburn (2–2)		23,480	16–15
32	May 7	@ White Sox	13–1	Hernández (5–1)	Buehrle (1–4)		21,092	17–15
33	May 8	@ White Sox	6–2	Danks (3–3)	Slowey (0–2)		25,193	17–16
34	May 9	Red Sox	7–6	Crain (1–1)	Papelbon (2–2)		25,477	18–16
35	May 10	Red Sox	5–2	Matsuzaka (6–0)	Perkins (0–1)	Papelbon (11)	33,839	18–17
36	May 11	Red Sox	9–8	Blackburn (3–2)	Wakefield (3–2)	Nathan (12)	26,511	19–17
37	May 12	Red Sox	7–3	Hernández (6–1)	Bucholz (2–3)		18,782	20–17
38	May 13	Blue Jays	5–3	Litsch (5–1)	Slowey (0–3)	Ryan (6)	18,110	20–18
39	May 14	Blue Jays	6–5	Halladay (4–5)	Bonser (2–5)	Downs (5)	21,026	20–19
40	May 15	Blue Jays	3–2 (11)	Camp (1–1)	Crain (1–2)	Ryan (7)	18,701	20–20
41	May 16	@ Rockies	4–2	Blackburn (4–2)	Jiménez (1–4)	Nathan (13)	35,336	21–20
42	May 17	@ Rockies	3–2	Herges (2–0)	Hernández (6–2)	Fuentes (5)	43,149	21–21
43	May 18	@ Rockies	6–2	Francis (1–4)	Slowey (0–4)		40,326	21–22
44	May 19	Rangers	7–6 (12)	Korecky (1–0)	Germán (1–3)		16,680	22–22
45	May 20	Rangers	11–4	Perkins (1–1)	Mathis (1–1)		19,376	23–22
46	May 21	Rangers	10–1	Ponson (3–0)	Blackburn (4–3)		22,032	23–23
47	May 22	Rangers	8–7 (10)	Benoit (3–1)	Bass (1–1)	Wilson (9)	23,126	23–24
48	May 23	@ Tigers	9–4	Slowey (1–4)	Galarraga (3–2)		40,732	24–24
49	May 24	@ Tigers	19–3	Robertson (2–4)	Bonser (2–6)		41,137	24–25
50	May 25	@ Tigers	6–1	Perkins (2–1)	Cruceta (0–2)		42,413	25–25
51	May 27	@ Royals	4–3 (12)	Crain (2–2)	Núñez (3–1)	Guerrier (1)	17,191	26–25
52	May 28	@ Royals	9–8 (10)	Crain (3–2)	Peralta (0–2)	Nathan (14)	13,621	27–25
53	May 29	@ Royals	5–1	Slowey (2–4)	Hochevar (3–5)		12,336	28–25
54	May 30	Yankees	6–5	Mussina (8–4)	Perkins (2–2)	Rivera (14)	30,188	28–26
55	May 31	Yankees	7–6 (12)	Ohlendorf (1–1)	Rincón (2–2)	Rivera (15)	36,441	28–27

June: 17–11

#	Date	Opponent	Score	Win	Loss	Save	Attendance	Record
56	June 1	Yankees	5–1	Bass (2–1)	Rasner (3–2)		27,479	29–27
57	June 2	Yankees	6–5	Guerrier (3–1)	Farnsworth (0–2)	Nathan (15)	20,168	30–27
58	June 3	Orioles	5–3	Liz (1–0)	Slowey (2–5)	Sherrill (19)	18,802	30–28
59	June 4	Orioles	7–5	Bonser (3–6)	Cabrera (5–2)	Nathan (16)	22,057	31–28
60	June 5	Orioles	3–2	Olson (5–2)	Bass (2–2)	Sherrill (20)	19,621	31–29
61	June 6	@ White Sox	10–6	Vázquez (6–4)	Blackburn (4–4)		26,459	31–30
62	June 7	@ White Sox	11–2	Buehrle (3–6)	Hernández (6–3)		32,930	31–31
63	June 8	@ White Sox	12–2	Floyd (7–3)	Slowey (2–6)		30,565	31–32
64	June 9	@ White Sox	7–5	Thornton (2–1)	Guerrier (3–2)	Jenks (15)	21,126	31–33
65	June 10	@ Indians	1–0	Sabathia (4–8)	Baker (2–1)		26,874	31–34
66	June 11	@ Indians	8–5	Blackburn (5–4)	Byrd (3–6)	Nathan (17)	18,742	32–34
67	June 12	@ Indians	12–2	Laffey (4–3)	Hernández (6–4)		21,716	32–35
68	June 13	@ Brewers	10–2	Slowey (3–6)	Bush (2–7)		38,586	33–35
69	June 14	@ Brewers	9–4 (12)	Bass (3–2)	Tavárez (0–2)		43,812	34–35
70	June 15	@ Brewers	4–2	McClung (4–3)	Baker (2–2)	Torres (8)	41,693	34–36
71	June 17	Nationals	2–1	Hernández (7–4)	Lannan (4–8)	Nathan (18)	20,920	35–36
72	June 18	Nationals	11–2	Slowey (4–6)	Bergmann (1–5)		23,841	36–36
73	June 19	Nationals	9–3	Perkins (3–2)	Hill (1–4)		24,793	37–36
74	June 20	D-backs	7–2	Baker (3–2)	Johnson (4–5)		29,069	38–36
75	June 21	D-backs	6–1	Blackburn (6–4)	Owings (6–6)		25,505	39–36
76	June 22	D-backs	5–3	Hernández (8–4)	Webb (11–4)	Nathan (19)	31,497	40–36
77	June 24	@ Padres	3–1	Reyes (2–0)	Hoffman (1–5)	Nathan (20)	36,948	41–36
78	June 25	@ Padres	9 – 3	Perkins (4–2)	Maddux (3–6)		22,324	42–36
79	June 26	@ Padres	4–3	Baker (4–2)	Banks (2–2)	Nathan (21)	28,789	43–36
80	June 27	Brewers	7–6	Guerrier (4–2)	Mota (2–5)	Nathan (22)	30,104	44–36
81	June 28	Brewers	5–1	Parra (8–2)	Hernández (8–5)		38,963	44–37
82	June 29	Brewers	5–0	Slowey (5–6)	Sheets (9–2)		30,655	45–37
83	June 30	Tigers	5–4	Fossum (1–0)	Guerrier (4–3)	Zumaya (1)	22,196	45–38

July: 15–10

#	Date	Opponent	Score	Win	Loss	Save	Attendance	Record
84	July 1	Tigers	6–4	Baker (5–2)	Robertson (6–7)	Nathan (23)	23,754	46–38
85	July 2	Tigers	7–0	Blackburn (7–4)	Bonine (2–1)		30,102	47–38
86	July 4	Indians	12–3	Hernández (9–5)	Byrd (3–10)		22,634	48–38
87	July 5	Indians	9–6	Slowey (6–6)	Mastny (0–2)	Nathan (24)	31,887	49–38
88	July 6	Indians	4–3	Perkins (5–2)	Lee (11–2)	Nathan (25)	30,258	50–38
89	July 7	@ Red Sox	1–0	Okajima (2–2)	Bass (3–3)	Papelbon (26)	37,912	50–39
90	July 8	@ Red Sox	6–5	Aardsma (3–2)	Guerrier (4–4)	Papelbon (27)	37,925	50–40
91	July 9	@ Red Sox	18–5	Beckett (9–5)	Hernández (9–6)		37,470	50–41
92	July 10	@ Tigers	7–6 (11)	Guerrier (5–4)	Dolsi (1–3)		41,952	51–41
93	July 11	@ Tigers	3–2	Perkins (6–2)	Galarraga (7–3)	Nathan (26)	42,352	52–41
94	July 12	@ Tigers	6–5	Baker (6–2)	Robertson (6–8)	Nathan (27)	41,301	53–41
95	July 13	@ Tigers	4–2	Verlander (7–9)	Blackburn (7–5)	Jones (17)	41,453	53–42
96	July 18	Rangers	6–0	Perkins (7–2)	Millwood (6–6)		30,134	54–42
97	July 19	Rangers	14–2	Hernández (10–6)	Harrison (1–1)		35,085	55–42
98	July 20	Rangers	1–0	Padilla (11–5)	Baker (6–3)	Wilson (22)	36,029	55–43
99	July 21	@ Yankees	12–4	Ponson (6–1)	Blackburn (7–6)		53,484	55–44
100	July 22	@ Yankees	8–2	Robertson (2–0)	Slowey (6–7)		53,406	55–45
101	July 23	@ Yankees	5–1	Mussina (13–6)	Perkins (7–3)	Rivera (25)	54,114	55–46
102	July 25	@ Indians	5–4	Lee (14–2)	Hernández (10–7)	Pérez (1)	33,512	55–47
103	July 26	@ Indians	11–4	Baker (7–3)	Carmona (4–3)		35,390	56–47
104	July 27	@ Indians	4–2	Guerrier (6–4)	Perez (1–2)	Nathan (28)	31,562	57–47
105	July 28	White Sox	7–0	Slowey (7–7)	Buehrle (8–9)		30,126	58–47
106	July 29	White Sox	6–5	Perkins (8–3)	Richard (0–1)	Nathan (29)	35,999	59–47
107	July 30	White Sox	8–3	Floyd (11–6)	Hernández (10–8)		42,705	59–48
108	July 31	White Sox	10–6	Crain (4–2)	Thornton (4–3)		31,493	60–48

August: 17–12

#	Date	Opponent	Score	Win	Loss	Save	Attendance	Record
109	August 1	Indians	4–1	Blackburn (8–6)	Sowers (1–6)	Nathan (30)	33,709	61–48
110	August 2	Indians	5–1	Byrd (6–10)	Slowey (7–8)		40,937	61–49
111	August 3	Indians	6–2	Liriano (1–3)	Ginter (1–3)		39,818	62–49
112	August 4	@ Mariners	11–6	Corcoran (2–0)	Bass (3–4)		27,758	62–50
113	August 5	@ Mariners	8–7	Putz (4–4)	Guerrier (6–5)		26,083	62–51
114	August 6	@ Mariners	7–3	Blackburn (9–6)	Washburn (5–11)		30,441	63–51
115	August 8	@ Royals	4–1	Slowey (8–8)	Davies (5–3)	Nathan (31)	33,653	64–51
116	August 9	@ Royals	7–3	Liriano (2–3)	Greinke (9–8)		27,960	65–51
117	August 10	@ Royals	5–4 (12)	Tejeda (1–2)	Breslow (0–1)		23,163	65–52
118	August 11	Yankees	4–0	Perkins (9–3)	Ponson (7–3)		30,126	66–52
119	August 12	Yankees	9–6 (12)	Veras (3–1)	Guerrier (6–6)	E. Ramírez (1)	33,036	66–53
120	August 13	Yankees	4–2	Slowey (9–8)	Rasner (5–9)	Nathan (32)	35,187	67–53
121	August 15	Mariners	9–3	Liriano (3–3)	Silva (4–14)		32,208	68–53
122	August 16	Mariners	7–6	Reyes (3–0)	Jiménez (0–2)		36,316	69–53
123	August 17	Mariners	11–8	Perkins (10–3)	Feierabend (0–1)	Nathan (33)	35,478	70–53
124	August 18	Athletics	3–2	Saarloos (1–0)	Blackburn (9–7)	Ziegler (3)	25,024	70–54
125	August 19	Athletics	13–2	Slowey (10–8)	Gallagher (4–6)		35,256	71–54
126	August 20	Athletics	3–1	Liriano (4–3)	Braden (3–3)	Nathan (34)	30,888	72–54
127	August 21	@ Angels	2–1 (12)	Crain (5–2)	Speier (1–7)	Nathan (35)	41,367	73–54
128	August 22	@ Angels	9–0	Perkins (11–3)	Saunders (14–6)		43,819	74–54
129	August 23	@ Angels	7–5	Oliver (5–1)	Blackburn (9–8)	Rodríguez (49)	43,906	74–55
130	August 24	@ Angels	5–3	Arredondo (6–1)	Crain (5–3)	Rodríguez (50)	40,011	74–56
131	August 25	@ Mariners	4–2 (11)	Dickey (4–8)	Crain (5–4)		23,277	74–57
132	August 26	@ Mariners	3–2	Rowland-Smith (3–2)	Baker (7–4)	Corcoran (1)	26,292	74–58
133	August 27	@ Mariners	6–5	Perkins (12–3)	Green (3–4)	Nathan (36)	23,581	75–58
134	August 28	@ Athletics	3–2	Devine (4–0)	Breslow (0–2)		12,357	75–59
135	August 29	@ Athletics	12–2	Slowey (11–8)	Meyer (0–3)	Breslow (1)	22,355	76–59
136	August 30	@ Athletics	3–2	Street (5–5)	Nathan (0–1)		25,238	76–60
137	August 31	@ Athletics	12–4	Baker (8–4)	Smith (6–14)		18,427	77–60

September: 11–15

#	Date	Opponent	Score	Win	Loss	Save	Attendance	Record
138	September 2	@ Blue Jays	7–5	Carlson (5–1)	Bonser (3–7)	Ryan (26)	21,254	77–61
139	September 3	@ Blue Jays	5–4 (11)	Carlson (6–1)	Guardado (3–4)		21,475	77–62
140	September 4	@ Blue Jays	9–0	Litsch (10–8)	Slowey (11–9)		25,128	77–63
141	September 5	Tigers	10–2	Liriano (5–3)	Galarraga (12–5)		24,424	78–63
142	September 6	Tigers	6–4	Rapada (3–0)	Guerrier (6–7)	Rodney (9)	42,606	78–64
143	September 7	Tigers	7–5	Lambert (1–1)	Perkins (12–4)	Rodney (10)	31,236	78–65
144	September 9	Royals	7–2	Blackburn (10–8)	Bannister (7–15)		17,015	79–65
145	September 10	Royals	7–1	Slowey (12–9)	Davies (6–7)		20,421	80–65
146	September 11	Royals	3–2 (10)	R. Ramírez (3–2)	Guerrier (6–8)	Soria (36)	20,138	80–66
--	September 12	@ Orioles	Postponed (rain) Rescheduled for September 13					
147	September 13	@ Orioles	12–2	Baker (9–4)	Cabrera (8–10)			81–66
148	September 13	@ Orioles	12–6	Korecky (2–0)	Olson (9–8)		21,712	82–66
149	September 14	@ Orioles	7–3	Liz (6–5)	Blackburn (10–9)		18,559	82–67
150	September 15	@ Indians	3–1	S. Lewis (2–0)	Slowey (12–10)	J. Lewis (9)	19,607	82–68
151	September 16	@ Indians	12–9 (11)	Mastny (2–2)	Nathan (0–2)		21,295	82–69
152	September 17	@ Indians	6–4	Mujica (3–2)	Mijares (0–1)	Lewis (10)	22,904	82–70
153	September 18	@ Rays	11–8	Guardado (4–4)	Wheeler (5–6)	Nathan (37)	17,296	83–70
154	September 19	@ Rays	11–1	Jackson (12–11)	Blackburn (10–10)		28,306	83–71
155	September 20	@ Rays	7–2	Kazmir (12–7)	Slowey (12–11)		36,048	83–72
156	September 21	@ Rays	4–1	Liriano (6–3)	Sonnanstine (13–8)	Nathan (38)	36,048	84–72
157	September 23	White Sox	9–3	Baker (10–4)	Vasquez (12–15)		35,225	85–72
158	September 24	White Sox	3–2	Blackburn (11–10)	Burhrle (14–12)	Nathan (39)	42,126	86–72
159	September 25	White Sox	7–6 (10)	Nathan (1–2)	Jenks (3–1)		43,601	87–72
160	September 26	Royals	8–1	Davies (9–7)	Liriano (6–4)		30,674	87–73
161	September 27	Royals	4–2	Meche (14–11)	Guerrier (6–9)	Soria (42)	38,072	87–74
162	September 28	Royals	6–0	Baker (11–4)	Duckworth (3–3)		42,942	88–74
163	September 30	@ White Sox*	1–0	Danks (12–9)	Blackburn (11–11)	Jenks (30)	40,354	88–75

*AL Central tiebreaker.

=== Roster ===
2008 Minnesota Twins
Roster
Pitchers: 30 Scott Baker; 60 Brian Bass; 53 Nick Blackburn; 26 Boof Bonser; 49 Craig Breslow; 28 Jesse Crain; 18 Eddie Guardado; 54 Matt Guerrier; 61 Liván Hernández; 38 Philip Humber; 41 Bobby Korecky; 47 Francisco Liriano; 50 José Mijares; 36 Joe Nathan; 17 Pat Neshek; 15 Glen Perkins; 37 Dennys Reyes; 39 Juan Rincón; 59 Kevin Slowey	Catchers: 44 Ryan Jorgensen; 7 Joe Mauer; 55 Mike Redmond; Infielders: 32 Brian Buscher; 25 Alexi Casilla; 19 Howie Clark; 12 Adam Everett; 23 Brendan Harris; 24 Mike Lamb; 18,27 Matt Macri; 33 Justin Morneau; 8 Nick Punto; 20 Matt Tolbert	Outfielders: 5 Michael Cuddyer; 22 Carlos Gómez; 16 Jason Kubel; 27 Craig Monroe; 11 Jason Pridie; 2 Denard Span; 21 Delmon Young; Other batters: 56 Randy Ruiz	Manager: 35 Ron Gardenhire; Coaches: 40 Rick Anderson (pitching); 9 Steve Liddle (bench); 43 Rick Stelmaszek (bullpen); 45 Scott Ullger (third base); 46 Joe Vavra (hitting); 13 Jerry White (first base)

=== Regular season transactions ===
- April 5, 2008: Placed outfielder Michael Cuddyer on the 15-day disabled list; recalled outfielder Denard Span from Rochester of the International League (AAA).
- April 11, 2008: Placed pitcher Kevin Slowey on the 15-day disabled list, retroactive to April 4.
- April 12, 2008: Recalled pitcher Francisco Liriano from Rochester.
- April 19, 2008: Placed shortstop Adam Everett on the 15-day disabled list, retroactive to April 15; recalled third baseman Brian Buscher from Rochester.
- April 24, 2008: Optioned outfielder Denard Span to Rochester of the International League (AAA).
- April 25, 2008: Activated outfielder Michael Cuddyer from the 15-day disabled list.
- April 26, 2008: Optioned pitcher Francisco Liriano to Rochester of the International League (AAA); recalled pitcher Bobby Korecky from Rochester.
- April 30, 2008: Optioned third baseman Brian Buscher to Rochester of the International League (AAA).
- May 2, 2008: Activated infielder Adam Everett from the 15-day disabled list.
- May 8, 2008: Placed pitcher Scott Baker on the 15-day disabled list, retroactive to May 4; activated pitcher Kevin Slowey from the 15-day disabled list.
- May 9, 2008: Placed pitcher Pat Neshek on the 15-day disabled list; recalled pitcher Glen Perkins from Rochester.
- May 11, 2008: Placed infielder Nick Punto on the 15-day disabled list; recalled infielder Alexi Casilla from Rochester.
- May 17, 2008: Placed infielder Matt Tolbert on the 15-day disabled list; purchased the contract of infielder Howie Clark from Rochester.
- May 22, 2008: Placed shortstop Adam Everett on the 15-day disabled list; recalled infielder Matt Macri from Rochester.

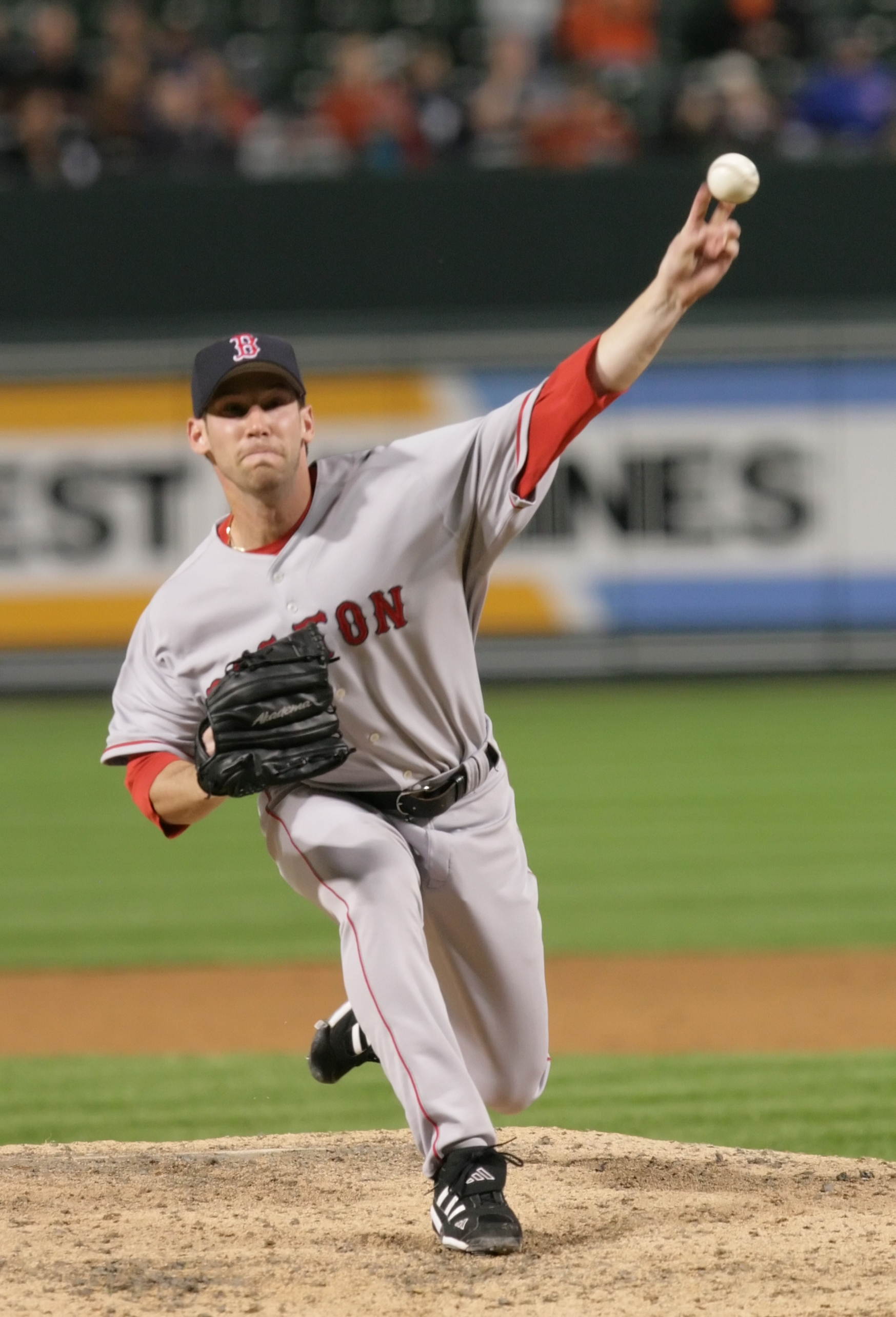
Craig Breslow

- May 29, 2008: Claimed pitcher Craig Breslow off waivers from the Cleveland Indians; transferred pitcher Pat Neshek to the 60-day disabled list; optioned pitcher Bobby Korecky to Rochester.
- May 31, 2008: Activated infielder Nick Punto from the 15-day disabled list; designated infielder Howie Clark for assignment.
- June 2, 2008: Outrighted infielder Howie Clark to the minor leagues.
- June 5, 2008: Optioned infielder Matt Macri to Rochester of the International League (AAA).
- June 6, 2008: Activated pitcher Scott Baker from the 15-day disabled list; placed infielder Nick Punto on the 15-day disabled list; recalled infielder Matt Macri from Rochester.
- June 13, 2008: Pitcher Juan Rincón designated for assignment; recalled infielder Brian Buscher from Rochester.
- June 18, 2008: Released pitcher Juan Rincón.
- June 24, 2008: Activated infielder Nick Punto from the 15-day disabled list: optioned infielder Howie Clark to Rochester.
- June 29, 2008: Placed outfielder Michael Cuddyer on the 15-day disabled list, retroactive to June 28; recalled outfielder Denard Span from Rochester of the International League (AAA).
- July 31, 2008: Placed infielder Alexi Casilla on the 15-day disabled list; activated infielder Adam Everett from the 15-day disabled list.
- August 1, 2008: Designated pitcher Liván Hernández and outfielder Craig Monroe for assignment; recalled pitcher Francisco Liriano from Rochester; purchased the contract of infielder Randy Ruiz from Rochester.
- August 11, 2008: Signed former Twin Bobby Kielty to a minor league contract.
- August 21, 2008: Activated infielder Alexi Casilla from the 15-day disabled list; assigned pitcher Brian Bass to Rochester of the International League (AAA).

== Player stats ==
=== Batting ===
Note: G = Games played; AB = At bats; R = Runs scored; H = Hits; 2B = Doubles; 3B = Triples; HR = Home runs; RBI = Runs batted in; AVG = Batting average; SB = Stolen bases

Player	G	AB	R	H	2B	3B	HR	RBI	AVG	SB
Scott Baker	28	2	1	1	0	0	0	0	.500	0
Brian Bass	44	0	0	0	0	0	0	0	.000	0
Nick Blackburn	33	3	0	1	0	0	0	0	.333	0
Boof Bonser	47	0	0	0	0	0	0	0	.000	0
Craig Breslow	42	0	0	0	0	0	0	0	.000	0
Brian Buscher	70	218	29	64	9	0	4	47	.294	0
Alexi Casilla	98	385	58	108	15	0	7	50	.281	7
Howie Clark	4	8	0	2	2	0	0	1	.250	0
Jesse Crain	66	0	0	0	0	0	0	0	.000	0
Michael Cuddyer	71	249	30	62	13	4	3	36	.249	5
Adam Everett	48	127	19	27	6	1	2	20	.213	0
Carlos Gómez	153	577	79	149	24	7	7	59	.258	33
Matt Guerrier	76	0	0	0	0	0	0	0	.000	0
Brendan Harris	130	434	57	115	29	3	7	49	.265	1
Liván Hernández	23	2	0	1	0	0	0	1	.500	0
Bobby Korecky	16	1	0	1	0	0	0	0	1.000	0
Jason Kubel	141	463	74	126	22	5	20	78	.272	0
Mike Lamb	81	236	20	55	12	3	1	32	.233	0
Matt Macri	18	34	3	11	1	0	1	4	.324	1
Joe Mauer	146	536	98	176	31	4	9	85	.328	1
Craig Monroe	58	163	22	33	9	0	8	29	.202	0
Justin Morneau	163	623	97	187	47	4	23	129	.300	0
Joe Nathan	68	0	0	0	0	0	0	0	.000	0
Glen Perkins	26	3	0	0	0	0	0	0	.000	0
Nick Punto	99	338	43	96	19	4	2	28	.284	15
Mike Redmond	38	129	14	37	6	0	0	12	.287	0
Dennys Reyes	75	0	0	0	0	0	0	0	.000	0
Juan Rincón	24	0	0	0	0	0	0	0	.000	0
Randy Ruiz	22	62	13	17	2	0	1	7	.274	0
Kevin Slowey	28	8	1	2	1	0	0	2	.250	0
Denard Span	93	347	70	102	16	7	6	47	.294	18
Matt Tolbert	41	113	18	32	6	3	0	6	.285	7
Delmon Young	152	575	80	167	28	4	10	69	.290	14
Team totals	163	5641	829	1572	298	49	111	791	.279	102

=== Pitching ===
Note: W = Wins; L = Losses; ERA = Earned run average; G = Games pitched; GS = Games started; SV = Saves; IP = Innings pitched; R = Runs allowed; ER = Earned runs allowed; BB = Walks allowed; K = Strikeouts

Player	W	L	ERA	G	GS	SV	IP	R	ER	BB	K
Scott Baker	11	4	3.45	28	28	0	172.1	66	66	42	141
Brian Bass	3	4	4.87	44	0	1	68.1	42	37	22	32
Nick Blackburn	11	11	4.05	33	33	0	193.1	102	87	39	96
Boof Bonser	3	7	5.93	47	12	0	118.1	87	78	36	97
Craig Breslow	0	2	1.63	42	0	1	38.2	9	7	14	32
Jesse Crain	5	4	3.59	66	0	0	62.2	29	25	24	50
Eddie Guardado	1	1	7.71	9	0	0	7.0	6	6	2	5
Matt Guerrier	6	9	5.19	76	0	1	76.1	47	44	37	59
Liván Hernández	10	8	5.48	23	23	0	139.2	93	85	29	54
Philip Humber	0	0	4.63	5	0	0	11.2	6	6	5	6
Bobby Korecky	2	0	4.58	16	0	0	17.2	9	9	8	6
Francisco Liriano	6	4	3.91	14	14	0	76.0	40	33	32	67
José Mijares	0	1	0.87	10	0	0	10.1	1	1	0	5
Joe Nathan	1	2	1.33	68	0	39	67.2	13	10	18	74
Pat Neshek	0	1	4.73	15	0	0	13.1	7	7	4	15
Glen Perkins	12	4	4.41	26	26	0	151.0	81	74	39	74
Dennys Reyes	3	0	2.33	75	0	0	46.1	12	12	15	39
Juan Rincón	2	2	6.11	24	0	0	28.0	21	19	16	20
Kevin Slowey	12	11	3.99	27	27	0	160.1	74	71	24	123
Team totals	88	75	4.16	163	163	42	1459.0	745	675	406	995

== Other post-season awards ==
- Calvin R. Griffith Award (Most Valuable Twin) – Justin Morneau
- Joseph W. Haynes Award (Twins Pitcher of the Year) – Joe Nathan
- Bill Boni Award (Twins Outstanding Rookie) – Denard Span
- Charles O. Johnson Award (Most Improved Twin) – Alexi Casilla
- Dick Siebert Award (Upper Midwest Player of the Year) – Joe Mauer
- Bob Allison Award (Leadership Award) – Justin Morneau
- Mike Augustin Award ("Media Good Guy" Award) – Joe Nathan
  - The above awards are voted on by the Twin Cities chapter of the BBWAA
- Carl R. Pohlad Award (Outstanding Community Service) – Joe Mauer
- Sherry Robertson Award (Twins Outstanding Farm System Position Player) – Ben Revere
- Jim Rantz Award (Twins Outstanding Farm System Pitcher) – Anthony Slama
- Kirby Puckett Award (Alumni Community Service) – Kent Hrbek
- Herb Carneal Award (Lifetime Achievement Award) – Carl Pohlad

== Farm system ==
Level	Team	League	Manager
AAA	Rochester Red Wings	International League	Stan Cliburn
AA	New Britain Rock Cats	Eastern League	Bobby Cuellar
A	Fort Myers Miracle	Florida State League	Jeff Smith
A	Beloit Snappers	Midwest League	Nelson Prada
Rookie	Elizabethton Twins	Appalachian League	Ray Smith
Rookie	GCL Twins	Gulf Coast League	Jake Mauer

LEAGUE CHAMPIONS: Elizabethton
