= Terry Ryan (baseball) =

American baseball executive

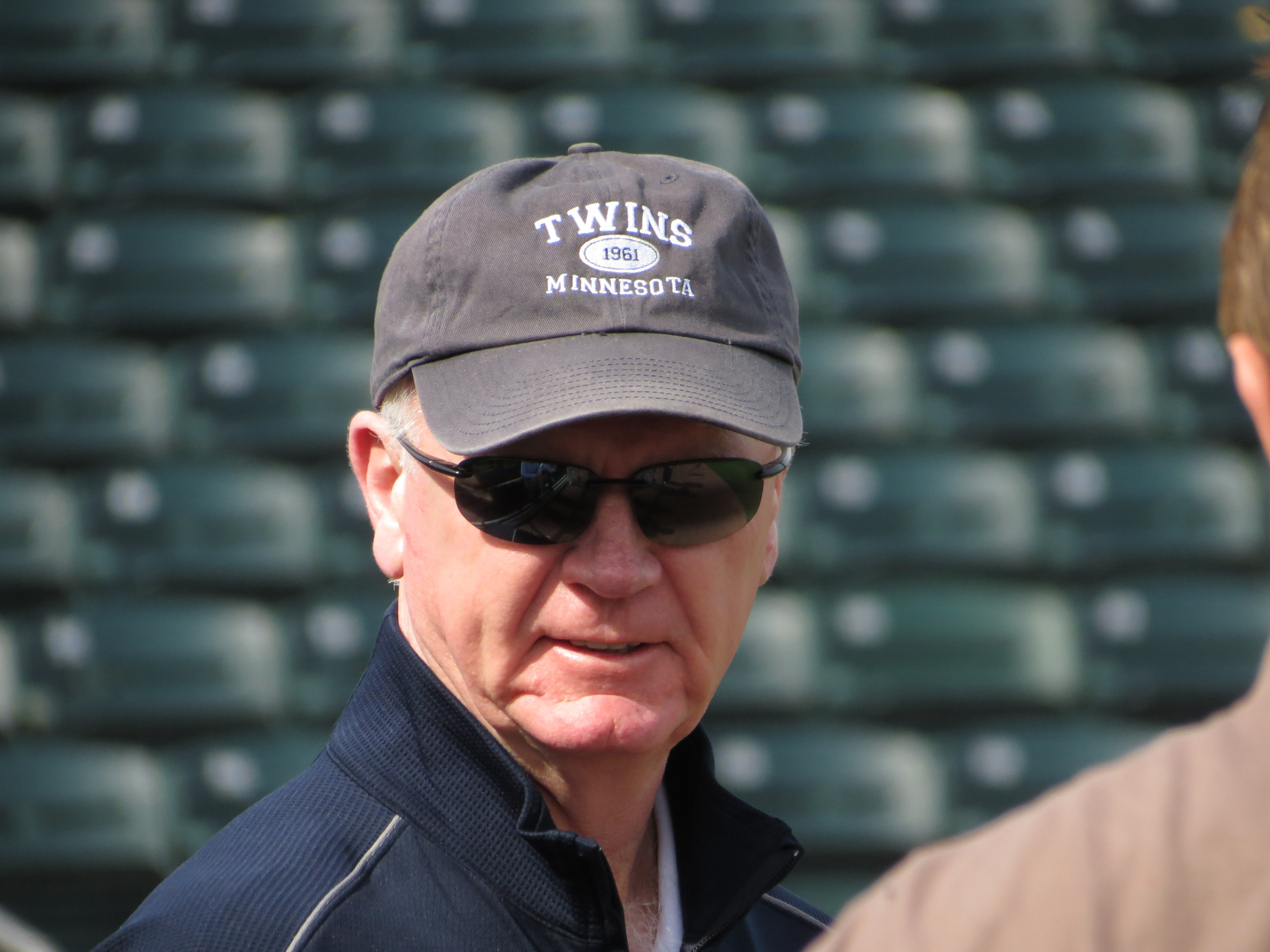

Philadelphia Phillies
- Special Assistant To The General Manager
- Born: October 26, 1953 (age 72); Janesville, Wisconsin, U.S.
- Stats at Baseball Reference

Career highlights and awards
- Minnesota Twins Hall of Fame

Terry W. Ryan (born October 26, 1953) is an American professional baseball executive and former general manager for the Minnesota Twins of Major League Baseball. Ryan was known for using a low payroll and building up the minor league system to put up contending teams. He resigned as general manager of the Twins on October 1, 2007, but returned to his former post on November 7, 2011, until being relieved of his duties on July 18, 2016. Ryan was hired as a special assignment scout by the Philadelphia Phillies on November 30, 2016.

== Early life and career ==
Ryan attended George S. Parker High School in Janesville, and was drafted in the 35th round by the Minnesota Twins in 1972.

== Playing career ==
Ryan pitched briefly in the Twins organization in the mid-70s. His playing career started with promise: Ryan posted a 10–0 record and 1.70 ERA in 43 games at Class A Wisconsin Rapids in 1973. However, he subsequently battled injuries and was released by the Twins' AA team in June 1976.

== Administrative career ==
After graduating from the University of Wisconsin–Madison in 1979, with a degree in physical education, Ryan quickly earned respect as an evaluator of talent in baseball. In 1980, the New York Mets hired him as a scout. He spent six seasons as a scout for the Mets before the Twins again showed interest in him. The team hired him as scouting director, a position he held for six years. He was then promoted to vice president and player personnel director under general manager Andy MacPhail. When MacPhail left for the Chicago Cubs in 1994, Ryan was chosen to replace him.

Ryan's organization relies heavily on constant scouting and analysis of every player in major and minor league baseball. As a result, the team made some startling and at the time questioned acquisitions of players who turned out to be drastically underrated and who became star players in the Twins organization.

Ryan had the unenviable task of succeeding MacPhail, architect of the Twins' 1987 and 1991 world champion teams. Ryan would endure losing seasons until 2001, but his trades turned out to have the future in mind. In 2002, the Twins began a sequence of winning their division.

His early years as GM had several lowlights. For example, during the 1995 season, he was forced to unload several high-priced veterans when the team was not contending. The unloaded veterans included Rick Aguilera, Scott Erickson, Mark Guthrie, and Kevin Tapani. To make matters worse, the prospects he received in these trades did not pan out. In particular, Scott Klingenbeck and Frank Rodriguez were expected to be solid major league players. Instead, they were busts who did not last in the majors.

In 1996, Ryan botched the signing of first baseman Travis Lee during the amateur draft. Lee exploited a never-before used clause that allows a draft pick to become a free agent if a team does not make an offer within 15 days of the draft. After the Twins failed to do this, Lee left for the Arizona Diamondbacks, who gave him a $10 million signing bonus.

=== Success as general manager ===
Things started looking up for Ryan only a couple of months later, when he traded veteran Dave Hollins to the Seattle Mariners for a player to be named later. On September 30, the Mariners sent David Ortiz to the Twins to complete the trade. Unfortunately for the Twins, Ortiz would not show MVP-caliber numbers until he left the Twins a few years later. Similarly, in August 1997, Ryan unloaded another aging veteran for a future All-Star. This time it was Roberto Kelly for Joe Mays. In 1998, he sent the disgruntled Chuck Knoblauch to the New York Yankees for four players, including two future All-Stars: shortstop Cristian Guzman and pitcher Eric Milton. In 1999, he again unloaded Rick Aguilera and received future starter Kyle Lohse. At the end of the year, he traded for future Cy Young Award winner Johan Santana, who was picked up in the Rule 5 Draft by the Florida Marlins from the Houston Astros. In July 2001, the Twins traded outfielder Matt Lawton to the New York Mets for pitcher Rick Reed.

=== Postseason success ===
Ryan continued making strong trades that enable the team to remain competitive. For example, in July 2002, he traded little-used outfielder Brian Buchanan (also acquired in the Knoblauch trade) to the San Diego Padres for Jason Bartlett. That year, the team made the postseason for the first time since the 1991 World Champion team and defeated the heavily favored Oakland Athletics in the 2002 American League Division Series. After the 2002 season, the Twins organization was named Organization of the Year by Baseball America and SportsTicker, while Ryan was named Executive of the Year by The Sporting News.

In 2003, Ryan swapped outfielder Bobby Kielty for accomplished veteran leadoff hitter Shannon Stewart. This move was credited with jump-starting the team and enabling them to repeat as division champions. In November 2003, Ryan sent popular catcher A. J. Pierzynski to the San Francisco Giants, gaining closer Joe Nathan, and starting pitchers Francisco Liriano and Boof Bonser. Another strong trade occurred a month later, when Ryan sent starter Eric Milton to the Philadelphia Phillies for starter Carlos Silva and infielder Nick Punto. His most recent trades affecting the current team were in December 2005, when he received second baseman Luis Castillo from the Florida Marlins for two minor leaguers. He also traded pitcher J.C. Romero to the Los Angeles Angels of Anaheim for Alexi Casilla.

=== Notable trades ===
- July 6, 1995: Traded closer Rick Aguilera to the Boston Red Sox for pitcher Frank Rodriguez and a player to be named later. The Twins were able to re-sign Aguilera on December 11.
- July 7, 1995: Traded pitcher Scott Erickson to the Baltimore Orioles for pitcher Scott Klingenbeck and a player to be named later.
- July 31, 1995: Traded pitchers Kevin Tapani and Mark Guthrie to the Los Angeles Dodgers for infielder Ron Coomer, pitchers Greg Hansell and José Parra, and a player to be named later. The Dodgers sent outfielder Chris Latham to the Twins on October 30 to complete the trade.
- August 29, 1996: Traded Dave Hollins to the Seattle Mariners for a player to be named later. On September 31, the Mariners sent David Ortiz to the Twins to complete the trade.
- August 20, 1997: Traded Roberto Kelly to the Seattle Mariners for players to be named later. On October 9, the Mariners sent the Twins future all-star Joe Mays and a minor leaguer to complete the deal.
- February 16, 1998: Traded second baseman Chuck Knoblauch to the New York Yankees in exchange for outfielder Brian Buchanan, shortstop Cristian Guzman, pitcher Eric Milton, pitcher Danny Mota, and cash.
- May 21, 1999: Traded Rick Aguilera and Scott Downs to the Chicago Cubs for pitchers Kyle Lohse and Jason Ryan.
- December 13, 1999: Under the Rule 5 Draft, the Twins sent minor leaguer Jared Camp and cash to the Florida Marlins in exchange for future Cy Young Award winner Johan Santana.
- September 9, 2000: Traded pitcher Héctor Carrasco to the Boston Red Sox for outfielder Lew Ford.
- July 30, 2001: Traded outfielder Matt Lawton to the New York Mets for pitcher Rick Reed.
- July 12, 2002: Traded Brian Buchanan to the San Diego Padres for shortstop Jason Bartlett.
- July 16, 2003: Traded Bobby Kielty to the Toronto Blue Jays for Shannon Stewart.
- November 14, 2003: Traded catcher A. J. Pierzynski and cash to the San Francisco Giants. Received pitchers Joe Nathan, Francisco Liriano, and Boof Bonser.
- December 3, 2003: Traded pitcher Eric Milton to the Philadelphia Phillies for pitcher Carlos Silva, infielder Nick Punto, and a player to be named later (Bobby Korecky).
- December 2, 2005: Traded Travis Bowyer and Scott Tyler to the Florida Marlins for second baseman Luis Castillo.
- December 9, 2005: Traded J.C. Romero to the Los Angeles Angels of Anaheim for infielder Alexi Casilla.
- July 30, 2007: Traded second baseman Luis Castillo to the New York Mets for minor league prospects Drew Butera (catcher) and Dustin Martin (center fielder).

=== Stepping down ===
On September 13, 2007, it was announced that Ryan would be stepping down as general manager for the Twins after 12 seasons. He was replaced by assistant general manager Bill Smith, but remained in the Twins organization as a senior adviser.

=== Return in November 2011 ===
On November 7, 2011, Twins owner Jim Pohlad fired Smith after a 99-loss season - the first time that the Twins had fired a general manager since relocating from Washington, D.C. Ryan, who had remained with the team in a consultant role since stepping down as GM after the 2007 season, returned to the job, officially on an interim basis. On October 6, 2012, Ryan announced that he had removed the "interim" from his title and would return as Minnesota's long-term general manager for the 2013 season. On Monday, February 10, 2014, Ryan revealed that he had been diagnosed with and is being treated for carcinoma, and would miss spring training.

=== 2016 firing ===
Ryan was relieved of his general manager duties July 18, 2016. Assistant GM Rob Antony took over as interim general manager. In joining the Phillies as a scout in November 2016, Ryan was reunited with Andy MacPhail, the Phillies' president/baseball operations since October 2015.

== Honors and awards ==
After he retired as general manager in 2007, Play Ball! Minnesota—sponsored by the Minnesota Twins Community Fund—renamed its highest honor, the "Play Ball! Minnesota Award", as the "Terry Ryan Award".

Preceded by Andy MacPhail; Bill Smith	Minnesota Twins General Manager; 1994–2007; 2011–2016	Succeeded by Bill Smith; Rob Anthony (interim)
