= Brian Buscher =

American baseball player (born 1981)

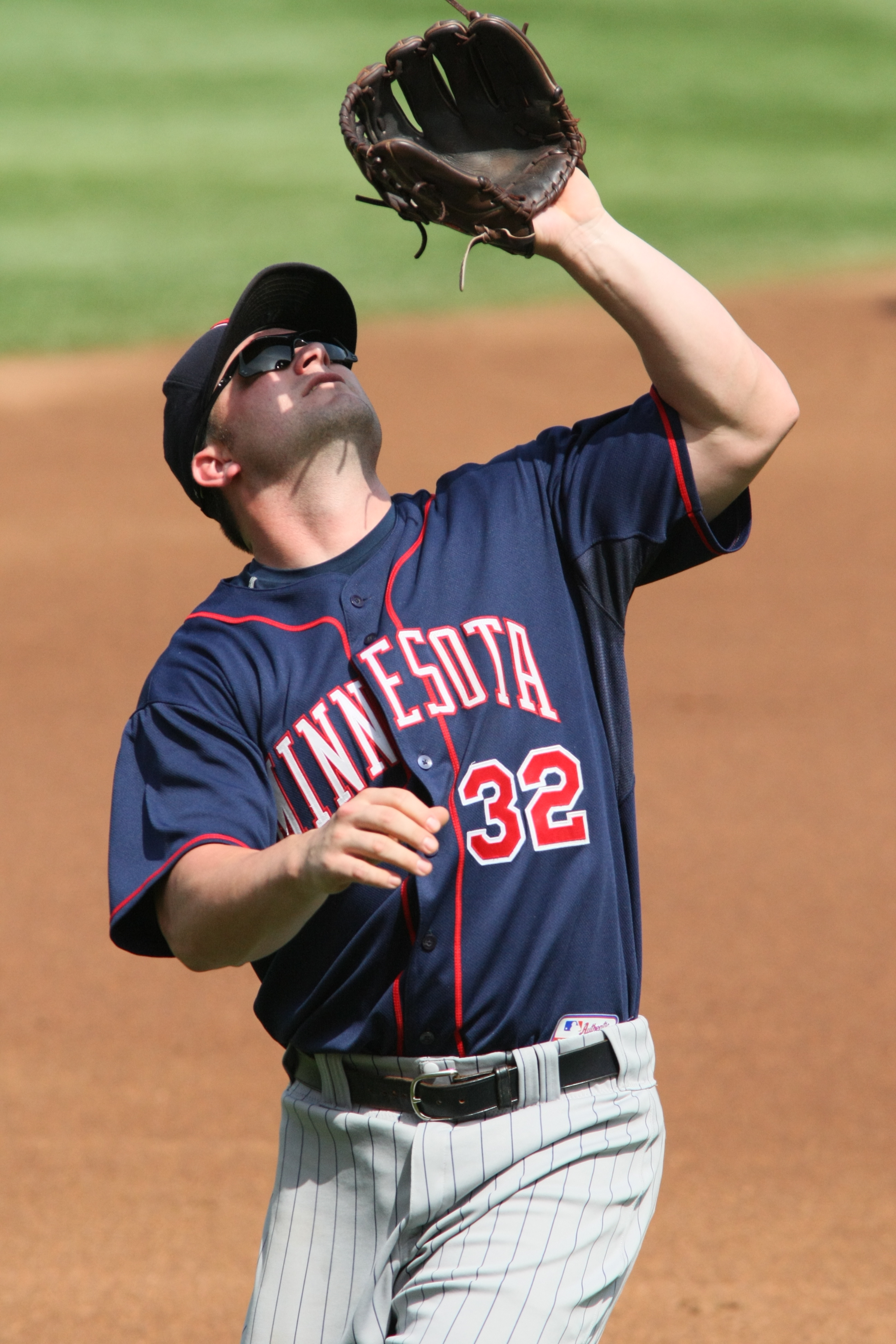
- Buscher with the Minnesota Twins
- Third baseman
- Born: April 18, 1981 (age 45); Jacksonville, Florida, U.S.
- Batted: Left Threw: Right

MLB debut
- July 27, 2007, for the Minnesota Twins

Last MLB appearance
- October 4, 2009, for the Minnesota Twins

MLB statistics
- Batting average: .266
- Home runs: 8
- Runs batted in: 69
- Stats at Baseball Reference

Teams
- Minnesota Twins (2007–2009)

Brian Phillip Buscher (born April 18, 1981) is an American former professional baseball player. He spent his entire career in Major League Baseball (MLB) with the Minnesota Twins. After his playing career, he became an undergraduate assistant coach for the South Carolina Gamecocks baseball team in 2011, remaining in the position until 2017.

== Professional career ==
Drafted by the San Francisco Giants in the third round (93rd overall) of the 2003 Major League Baseball draft, Buscher spent 2003–2006 in the Giants farm system, reaching as high as Double-A with the Connecticut Defenders. In December 2006, he was taken by the Minnesota Twins in the Rule 5 draft. The Twins purchased his contract on July 26, 2007, and Buscher made his major league debut the following day. Buscher finished his rookie campaign with a .244 batting average, two home runs, and 10 runs batted in (RBI) over the course of 33 games.

During the 2008 season, Buscher did not make the Opening Day roster and started the year with the Twins' Triple–A affiliate, the Rochester Red Wings. He was later called up to the Twins on April 20, and sent back on May 1 after batting .250 in eight at-bats. Buscher was recalled again on June 12, taking former Twins reliever Juan Rincón's roster spot. At the time of his recall, Buscher was batting .328 (58-for-177) with 12 doubles, seven home runs and 27 RBI in 51 games for the Red Wings. Upon arriving in Minneapolis, Justin Morneau took Buscher under his wing, allowing him to stay at him apartment and showing him how things worked in the major leagues. After his June callup, Buscher replaced struggling veteran Mike Lamb as the everyday third baseman. He finished the season batting .294 with four home runs and 47 RBI in 70 games.

In 2009, Buscher played sparingly, making 136 at-bats while batting .235 with two home runs and 12 RBI in 61 games. He served as a platoon DH alongside Brendan Harris. Buscher did not make the Twins' 2009 playoff roster. He was outrighted off the team's 40-man on November 3, 2009.

On December 2, 2009, Buscher signed a minor league contract with the Cleveland Indians that included an invitation to spring training. He did not make the major league club and was assigned to minor league camp on April 2, 2010. After spending the first half of the season with the Triple-A Columbus Clippers, Buscher was transferred to the Low–A Mahoning Valley Scrappers on June 13. He was transferred back to the Clippers and released from the Indians' organization on June 29. Buscher went on to be manager of the Columbia Blowfish.

== See also ==
- Rule 5 draft results
