= Matt Guerrier =

American baseball player (born 1978)

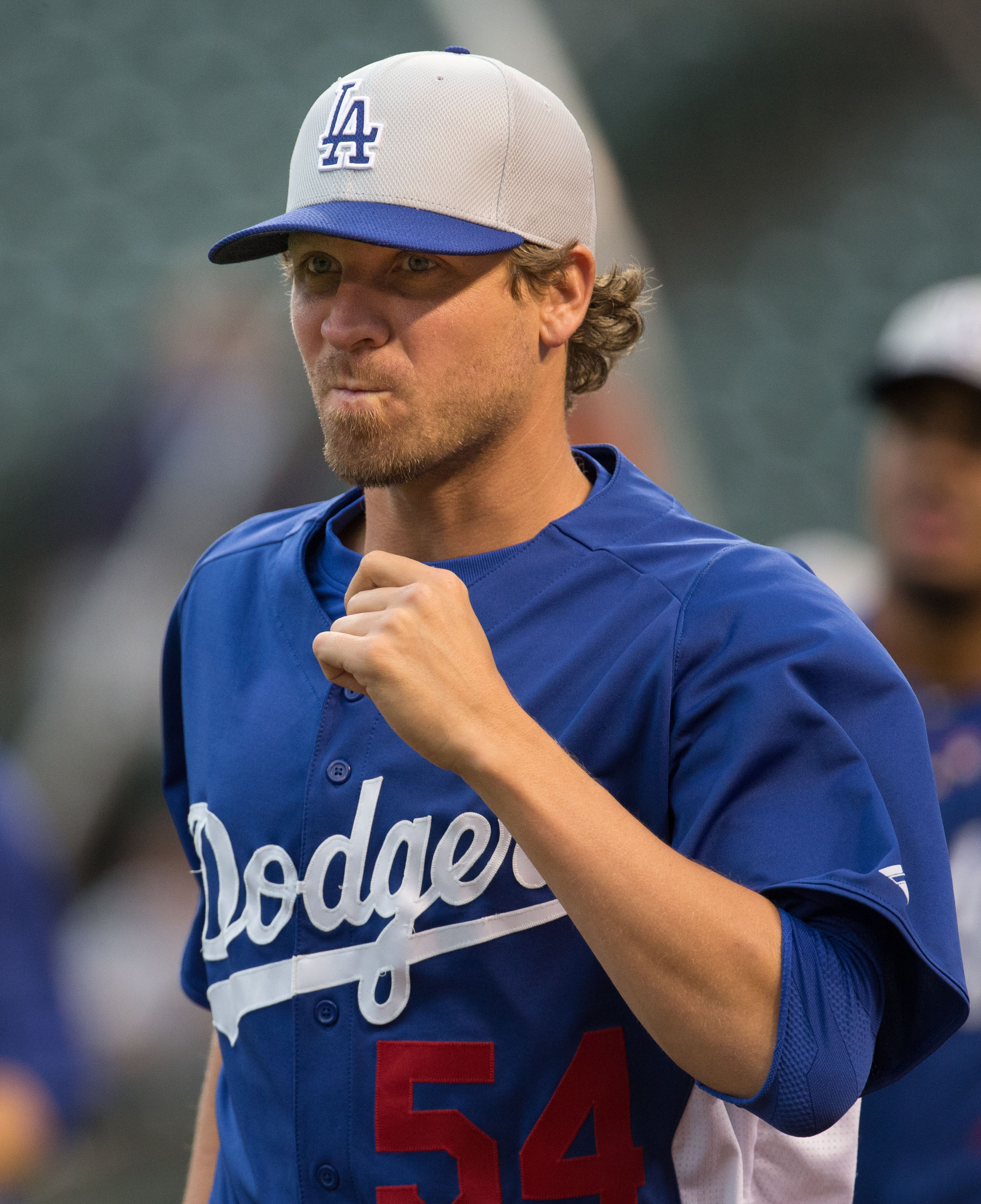
- Guerrier with the Los Angeles Dodgers in 2013
- Pitcher
- Born: August 2, 1978 (age 48); Shaker Heights, Ohio, U.S.
- Batted: Right Threw: Right

MLB debut
- June 17, 2004, for the Minnesota Twins

Last appearance
- July 22, 2014, for the Minnesota Twins

MLB statistics
- Win–loss record: 27–35
- Earned run average: 3.52
- Strikeouts: 411
- Stats at Baseball Reference

Teams
- Minnesota Twins (2004–2010); Los Angeles Dodgers (2011–2013); Chicago Cubs (2013); Minnesota Twins (2014)

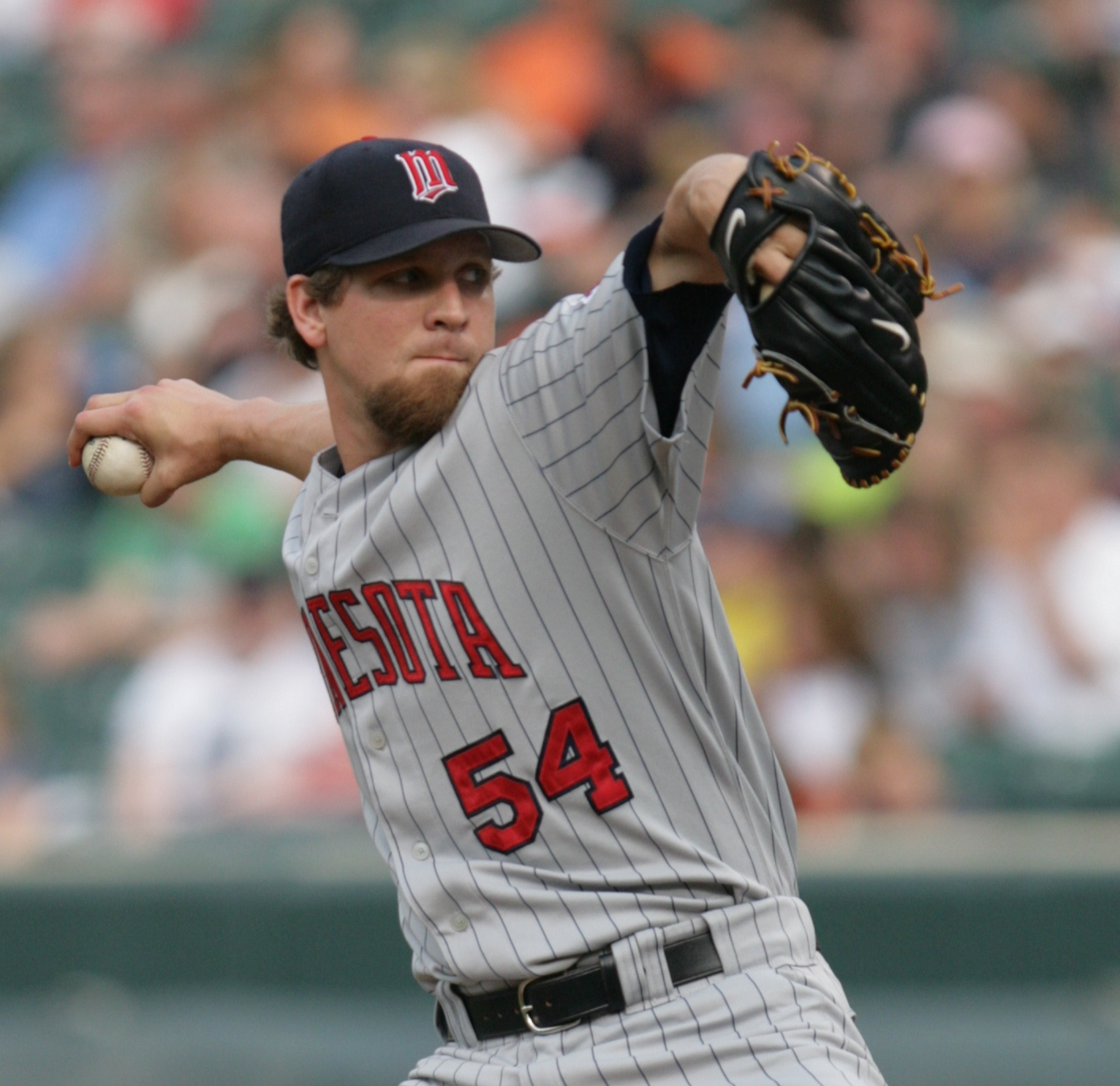
Guerrier pitching for the Minnesota Twins in 2006

Matthew Olson Guerrier (born August 2, 1978) is an American former professional baseball relief pitcher. He played in Major League Baseball (MLB) for the Minnesota Twins, Los Angeles Dodgers, and Chicago Cubs.

== Amateur career ==
A native of Cleveland, Ohio, Guerrier attended Shaker Heights High School. He was selected by the Kansas City Royals in the 33rd round (979th overall) of the 1996 Major League Baseball draft, but did not sign, opting instead to play college baseball at Kent State University. While at Kent State in 1997, he played collegiate summer baseball in the Cape Cod Baseball League for the Yarmouth-Dennis Red Sox.

== Professional career ==
=== Chicago White Sox ===
Guerrier was drafted by the Chicago White Sox in the 10th round (309th overall) of the 1999 MLB draft. He pitched in the White Sox minor league system through 2001, reaching Triple-A with the Charlotte Knights.

=== Pittsburgh Pirates ===
On March 27, 2002, Guerrier was traded by the White Sox to the Pittsburgh Pirates for Dámaso Marte. He spent the next two seasons pitching in Triple-A for the Nashville Sounds.

=== Minnesota Twins ===
On November 20, 2003, Guerrier was selected off waivers by the Minnesota Twins. Guerrier made his Major League debut on June 17, 2004 against the Montreal Expos as the starting pitcher. He worked four innings and allowed two earned runs while striking out three. For the season, he appeared in nine games (two starts), going 0–1 with a 5.68 ERA.

Guerrier did not pick up his first win until September 23, 2006 against the Baltimore Orioles. In 2007, he became a mainstay of the Twins bullpen, finishing the season 2–4 with one save and a 2.35 ERA in 73 relief appearances.

In 2008, the Twins lost primary setup pitcher Pat Neshek to injury early in the season and Guerrier took over part of that role for a short time. He pitched poorly in the second half, however, sporting an 8.88 ERA. Guerrier made 76 appearances in 2008, finishing 6–9 with one save and a 5.19 ERA 76 1/3 innings. He improved greatly in 2009, posting a 5–1 record with one save and a 2.36 ERA in 79 relief appearances. He also led the American League with 33 holds. He became a free agent following the 2010 season.

=== Los Angeles Dodgers ===
On December 16, 2010, Guerrier agreed to a three-year deal with the Los Angeles Dodgers. He appeared in a team high 70 games for the Dodgers, the fifth straight season he pitched in at least 70 games. He finished the season 4–3 with a 4.07 ERA in 66 1/3 innings worked and became the first pitcher in baseball history with exactly one save in six straight seasons.

In 2012, Guerrier pitched in seven games in April and was then shut down with right elbow tendinitis. He was placed on the 60-day disabled list and did not rejoin the Dodgers until the last week of August, ending his string of five straight seasons with at least 70 games pitched. Due to the injury, he only appeared in 16 games for the Dodgers in 2012, going 0–2 with a 3.86 ERA.

Guerrier pitched in 34 games with the Dodgers in 2013, posting a 2–3 record with a 4.80 ERA before he was designated for assignment on June 30.

=== Chicago Cubs ===
On July 1, 2013, Guerrier was traded to the Chicago Cubs in exchange for Carlos Mármol. He appeared in 15 games for the Cubs, and was 2–1 with a 2.13 ERA in 12 2/3 innings. He was shut down for the season in August after tearing the flexor muscle in his right forearm. He became a free agent following the season.

=== Minnesota Twins (second stint) ===
On January 29, 2014, Guerrier signed a minor league contract to rejoin the Minnesota Twins organization. The Twins released Guerrier on March 24, a week prior to the end of spring training. He was re-signed the next day. Guerrier had his contract selected to the major league roster on May 8. Guerrier was designated for assignment on July 24. At the time, he was 0–1 with a 3.86 ERA in 27 appearances. He elected free agency on July 29.

== Coaching career ==
On June 3, 2025, Guerrier was announced as a coach for the United States national under-18 baseball team's development program in Cary, North Carolina.

== Pitching repertoire ==
Guerrier's most commonly thrown pitch is alternately called cutter thrown in the high 80s. He also has a four-seam and two-seam fastball (low 90s), a curveball (78-80), and an occasional changeup to left-handed hitters.
