= Randy Ruiz =

American baseball player and coach (born 1977)

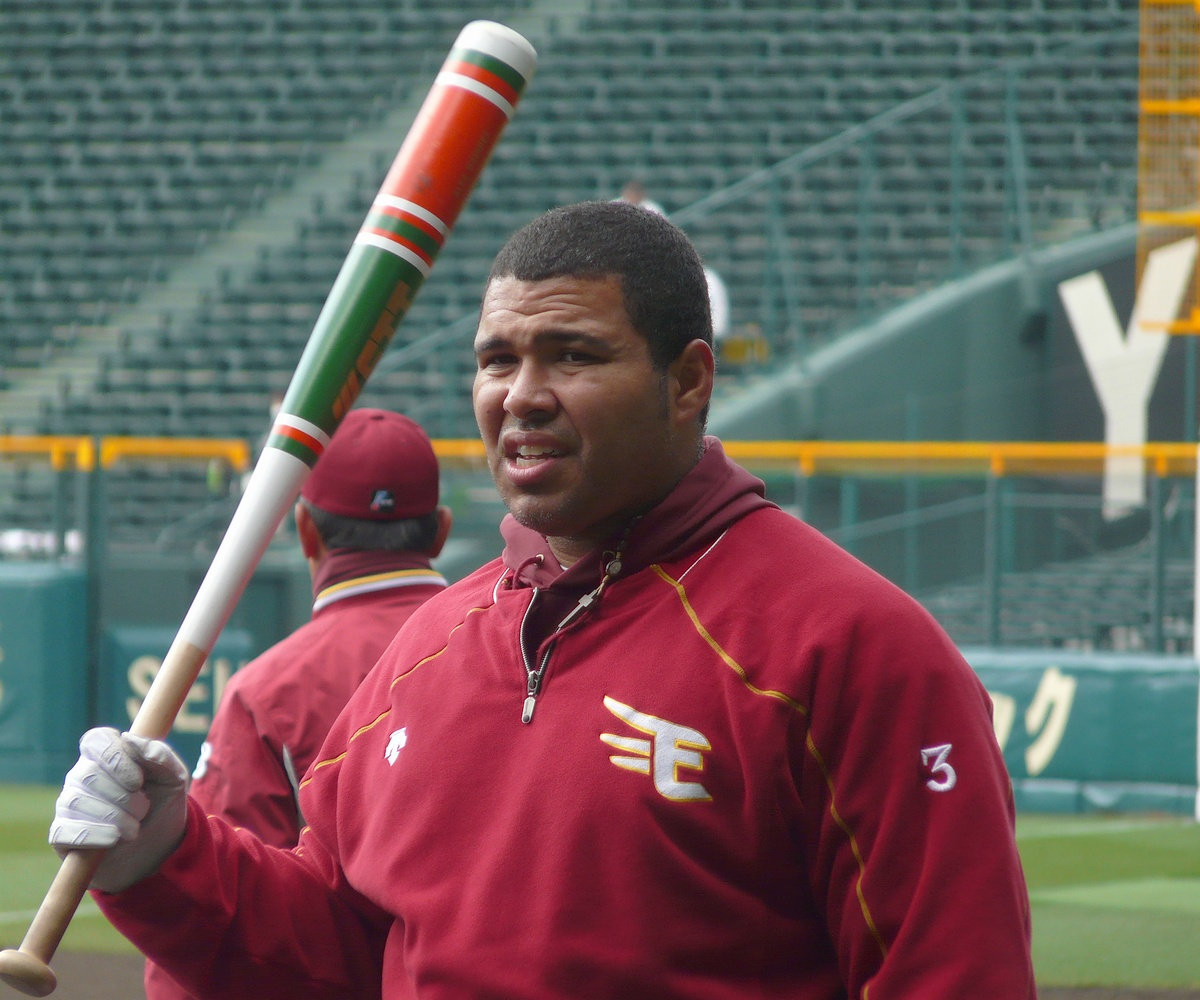
- First baseman / Hitting coach
- Born: October 19, 1977 (age 48); The Bronx, New York, U.S.
- Batted: Right Threw: Right

Professional debut
- MLB: August 1, 2008, for the Minnesota Twins
- NPB: June 1, 2010, for the Tohoku Rakuten Golden Eagles

Last appearance
- MLB: May 17, 2010, for the Toronto Blue Jays
- NPB: August 22, 2012, for the Yokohama DeNA BayStars

MLB statistics
- Batting average: .272
- Home runs: 12
- Runs batted in: 25

NPB statistics
- Batting average: .239
- Home runs: 20
- Runs batted in: 60
- Stats at Baseball Reference

Teams
- Minnesota Twins (2008); Toronto Blue Jays (2009–2010); Tohoku Rakuten Golden Eagles (2010–2011); Yokohama DeNA BayStars (2012)
Medals
Men's baseball
Representing Puerto Rico
Central American and Caribbean Games
Gold medal – first place	2018 Barranquilla	Team

Randy Radames Ruiz (born October 19, 1977) is an American former professional baseball designated hitter and first baseman. He stands 6'1" and weighs 240 pounds. Born in The Bronx, New York to parents from Santurce, Puerto Rico, he attended James Monroe High School, and played baseball under coach Mike Turo. He then attended Bellevue University in Bellevue, Nebraska, where he played college level baseball. Ruiz was originally drafted by the New York Mets in the 36th round (1,068th overall) of the 1996 Major League Baseball draft, but did not sign.

In Minor League Baseball, he played in the Cincinnati Reds, Baltimore Orioles, Philadelphia Phillies (twice), New York Yankees, Kansas City Royals, Pittsburgh Pirates, and San Francisco Giants organizations. Ruiz holds the record for the longest hitting streak by a Rochester Red Wings player since 1979, with 24 consecutive games. He also won the Rookie of the Year Award in the International League at the age of 30. In 2008, Ruiz was called up to play in Major League Baseball with the Minnesota Twins, and he also later spent time with the Toronto Blue Jays. During the offseason, he played for the Indios de Mayagüez in the Puerto Rico Baseball League.

== Career ==
=== Cincinnati Reds ===
Ruiz spent nine baseball seasons with seven different franchises in Minor League Baseball. On July 11, 1999, he was signed to the Cincinnati Reds organization as a non-drafted free agent. He made his professional debut that year, playing in 33 games for the Gulf Coast Reds and two games for Single-A Clinton LumberKings.

In 2000, Ruiz won the Pioneer League batting title with the Billings Mustangs, and was named to the league's post-season All-Star squad. He batted .381 with 10 home runs and 55 RBI in just 61 games. Ruiz also ranked fourth in the league in hits (88) and slugging percentage (.584).

In 2001, Ruiz tied for third in the league in extra base hits with 57, fourth in runs batted in (RBI) with 92, and fifth in doubles with 34. The Reds released him during spring training on March 24, 2003.

=== Baltimore Orioles ===
Five days after his release from the Reds, Ruiz signed with the Baltimore Orioles organization on March 29, 2003. He was assigned to begin the season with the Single-A Frederick Keys, batting .250 with a home run and 8 RBI in 17 games before being transferred to the Single-A Delmarva Shorebirds. In 67 games with the Shorebirds, Ruiz hit .302 with 11 home runs and 51 RBI. From May 28 to June 8, he posted a season-best 11-game hitting streak.

=== Philadelphia Phillies ===
In 2005, Ruiz won the Eastern League batting title while playing with the Reading Phillies in the Philadelphia Phillies organization. During that season, he had two violations of the MLB substance abuse policy, of the minor league drug prevention, and treatment program, which lowered the chances of him reaching the major leagues. He had to serve two suspensions, testing positive for an anabolic steroid, Stanozolol. Ruiz denied he ever used the drug, and instead alleged his positive tests were the result of his use of Sildenafil. Failing the first drug test, he served a 15-day suspension. Failing a second drug test, Ruiz had to serve a 30-day suspension under the guidelines of the substance abuse policy again. He made an appeal about the drug test, but it was denied. Due to Ruiz being suspended from playing baseball, the Reading Phillies received Nate Grindell from the Triple-A Scranton/Wilkes Barre Red Barons roster to replace him until his suspension expired.

=== Kansas City Royals and New York Yankees ===
In 2006, Ruiz signed with the Kansas City Royals organization as a minor league free agent. He began the season with the Double-A Wichita Wranglers, batting .217 with two home runs and 3 RBI in six games before being released on April 14. On April 23, Ruiz signed a minor league contract with the New York Yankees. He was assigned to the Double-A Trenton Thunder, where he batted .286 with 26 home runs and 87 RBI in 119 games.

=== Pittsburgh Pirates, return to Philadelphia, San Francisco Giants ===
On January 20, 2007, Ruiz signed a minor league contract with the Pittsburgh Pirates. The Pirates assigned him to the Double-A Altoona Curve, where he batted .290 with seven home runs and 30 RBI in 47 games. On June 1, Ruiz was acquired by the Phillies as part of a conditional deal, and he returned to Double-A Reading. He batted .378 with three home runs and 12 RBI in 22 games with Reading, which earned a promotion to the Triple-A Ottawa Lynx. In 22 games with Ottawa, Ruiz hit .215 with four home runs and 11 RBI. On July 23, Ruiz was released by the Phillies, and he was signed by the San Francisco Giants two days later. He concluded the season with the Double-A Connecticut Defenders, batting .291 with eight home runs and 27 RBI in 39 games.

=== Minnesota Twins ===
On November 16, 2007, Ruiz was signed by the Minnesota Twins as a minor league free agent. He began the 2008 season with the Rochester Red Wings, the Twins' Triple-A affiliate. From June 22 – July 19 of that season, Ruiz had hits in 24 consecutive games, the longest hitting streak by a Red Wings player since 1979, when the team began keeping daily statistics for individual players. The Twins recognized Ruiz as the organization's Minor League Player of the Month of June. He had a batting average of .441, with three home runs and 12 RBI during his last ten games with the Red Wings, before being called up by the Twins to play in the major leagues. In 111 games with Rochester, Ruiz posted a .320 batting average, 33 doubles, 17 home runs, and 68 RBI.

Ruiz's contract was purchased by the Twins on August 1, 2008. In addition, the team also recalled Francisco Liriano from Triple-A Rochester. Liriano and Ruiz were eating together at a restaurant when they heard about the call-up. The Twins designated them to replace right-handed pitcher Liván Hernández and outfielder Craig Monroe, making them free agents. That night, he made his major league debut for the Twins at age 30 as the designated hitter. The Cleveland Indians were playing against the Twins at Hubert H. Humphrey Metrodome with 33,709 people attending the game. Ruiz had three plate appearances, getting his first major league hit on his third at bat off of a pitch by starting pitcher Jeremy Sowers in the seventh inning. He also hit his first major league home run on August 27, 2008, off of Seattle Mariners' pitcher, Ryan Rowland-Smith, only hours after he was named the International League Rookie of the Year. "Feels great, but I'm really down right now because we lost," Ruiz said. "We had a runner at second there and no outs. I should have been up there moving him over." Ruiz played in 22 games with Minnesota, finishing with a .274 average, a home run and 7 RBI.

Ruiz was released by the Twins on December 3, 2008.

=== Toronto Blue Jays ===
Ruiz signed a minor league contract with the Toronto Blue Jays on December 17, 2008. He began the season playing with the Las Vegas 51s in the Pacific Coast League, where he was selected to play in the 2009 Triple-A All-Star Game. Through 114 games with Las Vegas, Ruiz was having one of the best offensive seasons of any player in the PCL, with a .320 batting average, 81 runs scored, 43 doubles, 25 homers, 106 runs batted in, 270 total bases, a .392 on-base percentage, and a .584 slugging average. His marks in doubles, RBIs, and total bases led the league, when he was called up to Toronto on August 11. On September 4, Ruiz was selected as MVP of the PCL.

Ruiz was called up to the Blue Jays major league roster on August 11, replacing Alex Ríos, who was claimed on waivers by the Chicago White Sox. Toronto was in New York at the time, to face the New York Yankees at the new Yankee Stadium, only a few blocks from where Ruiz had grown up. After striking out in his first at bat, Ruiz hit his first home run as a Blue Jay off Yankees pitcher Joba Chamberlain in the third inning of a 7–5 loss. Ruiz duplicated the feat the next day, homering in the second inning off ex-Jay A. J. Burnett. On September 6, in a home game against the Yankees, former Blue Jay Josh Towers threw a ball up and in that hit Ruiz in the face. He walked off on his own power, receiving a standing ovation and waving to the crowd. He finished the 2009 season batting .313 with 10 home runs and 17 RBI in 33 games.

Ruiz returned to the Blue Jays for the 2010 season, and was included on the team's Opening Day roster. However, he struggled to begin the season, batting just .150 with a home run in 13 games. In May 2010, Ruiz asked for his release from the Blue Jays organization due to receiving a contract offer in Japan.

=== Tohoku Rakuten Eagles ===
After being granted his release from Toronto on May 19, 2010, Ruiz subsequently signed a one-year, $493,000 contract with the Tohoku Rakuten Golden Eagles of the Nippon Professional Baseball (NPB). In 81 games with the Eagles, he batted .266 with 12 home runs and 38 RBI. On November 29, 2011, he became a free agent.

=== Arizona Diamondbacks ===
On March 7, 2012, Ruiz signed a minor league contract with the Arizona Diamondbacks. He was optioned to the Triple-A Reno Aces, where he started strong, batting .372 with three doubles, six home runs and 23 RBI in 21 April games. On May 2, the Diamondbacks announced that Ruiz had been named their Minor League Player of the Month for his performance in April. Ruiz was released by the Diamondbacks organization on June 11. In 49 games with Reno, he hit .332 with 14 home runs and 53 RBI.

=== Yokohama BayStars ===
After his release from the Diamondbacks, Ruiz signed with the Yokohama DeNA BayStars for an estimated ¥15 million contract. He played in 32 games with the BayStars, batting .210 with two home runs and 5 RBI.

=== Chicago White Sox ===
On January 1, 2013, Ruiz signed a minor league contract with the Chicago White Sox. He was released on March 23.

=== New York Yankees (second stint) ===
On June 17, 2013, Ruiz signed a minor league contract with the New York Yankees and was assigned to their Triple-A affiliate, the Scranton/Wilkes-Barre RailRiders. In 71 games for the RailRiders, Ruiz posted a .274 batting average, 17 home runs and 42 RBI.
