= Brian Bass =

American baseball player (born 1982)

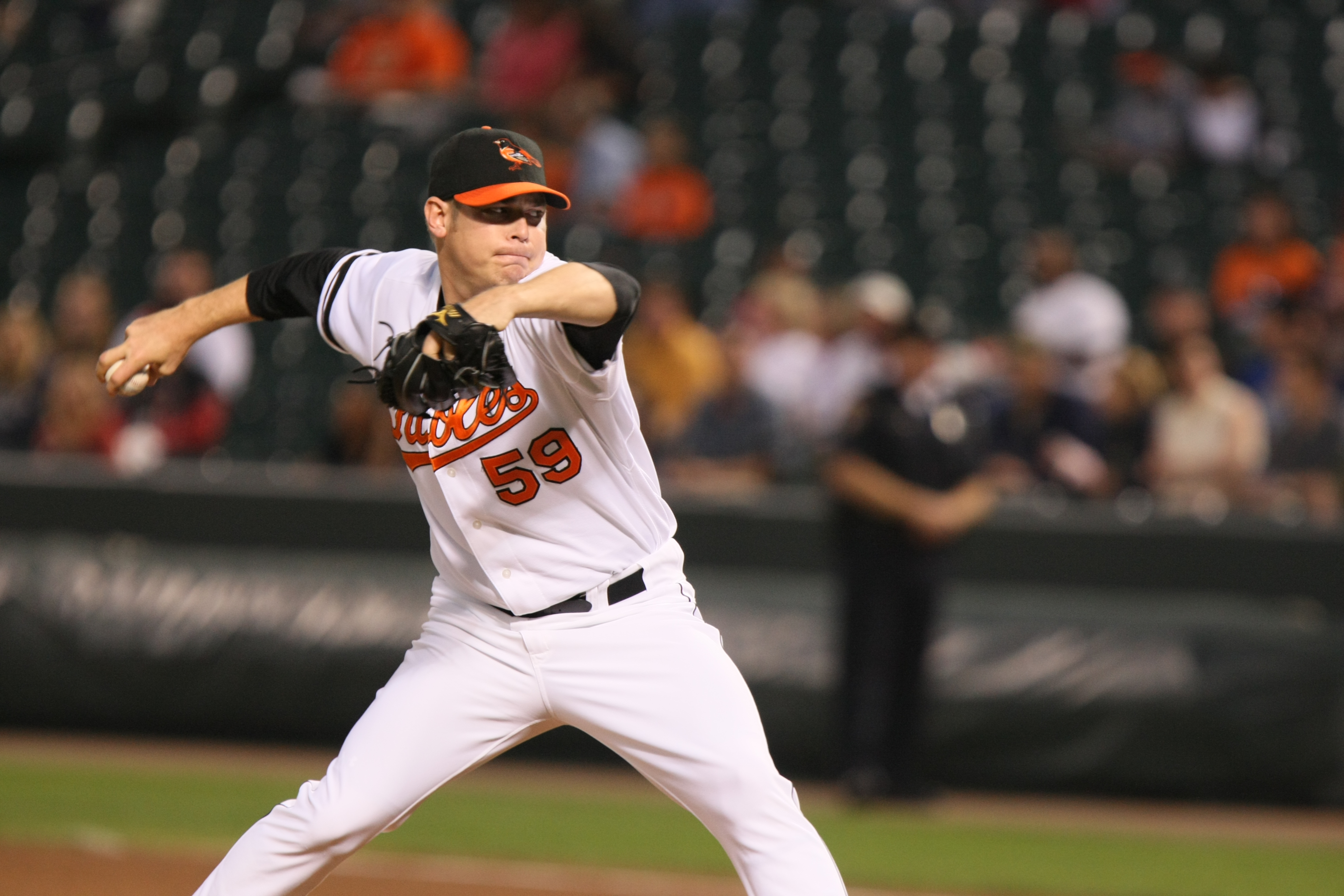
- Bass with the Baltimore Orioles in 2008
- Pitcher
- Born: January 6, 1982 (age 44); Pinehurst, North Carolina, U.S.
- Batted: Right Threw: Right

Professional debut
- MLB: April 1, 2008, for the Minnesota Twins
- KBO: April 15, 2012, for the Hanwha Eagles

Last appearance
- MLB: September 8, 2010, for the Pittsburgh Pirates
- KBO: April 18, 2012, for the Hanwha Eagles

MLB statistics
- Win–loss record: 9–7
- Earned run average: 5.16
- Strikeouts: 104

KBO statistics
- Win–loss record: 0–1
- Earned run average: 48.60
- Strikeouts: 1
- Stats at Baseball Reference

Teams
- Minnesota Twins (2008); Baltimore Orioles (2008–2009); Pittsburgh Pirates (2010); Hanwha Eagles (2012)

Brian Michael Bass (born January 6, 1982) is an American former professional baseball pitcher who played in Major League Baseball (MLB) for the Minnesota Twins, Baltimore Orioles, and Pittsburgh Pirates.

== Playing career ==
=== Kansas City Royals (2000–2006) ===
Bass, a graduate of Robert E. Lee High School in Montgomery, Alabama, was selected by the Kansas City Royals in the sixth round (164th overall) of the 2000 Major League Baseball draft.

After signing with the Royals, Bass played for the Rookie League Gulf Coast Royals in 2000. He went 3–5 with a 3.89 ERA in 12 games (nine starts). Bass also made one start at the Single-A level for the Charleston Alley Cats.

In 2001, Bass played for the Single-A Burlington Bees. Making 26 starts, he had a 4.65 ERA and went 3–10; his 10 losses are still an all-time high for him. Bass played the entire 2002 season for the Bees again, improving his performance on the previous season, making 20 starts and finishing 5–7 with a 3.83 ERA.

Bass had the best season of his minor league career in 2003 while playing for the Single-A Wilmington Blue Rocks. Making 26 starts, he went 9–8 with a 2.84 ERA. He was third on the team in wins (9), second in the team in games started (26) and innings pitched (152 1/3), and led the team in strikeouts with 119. On August 6, against the Winston-Salem Warthogs, Bass came within one out of a no-hitter. Baseball America named Bass as the Royals eighth best prospect.

Bass went winless in 2004 while playing for the Rookie League Arizona Royals and the Double-A Wichita Wranglers. Losing a combined 5 games, he had a 5.94 ERA in 14 starts. In 2005, while playing for the Wranglers again, Bass had a 12–8 record and a 5.24 ERA in 27 starts.

In 2006, Bass split the season between the Arizona Royals, the Wichita Wranglers, and the Triple-A Omaha Royals. Making a combined 15 starts in 16 games, Bass went 6–7 with a 5.70 ERA. Bass became a minor league free agent after the season.

=== Minnesota Twins (2007–2008) ===
Bass, after leaving the Royals organization, signed a minor league contract with the Minnesota Twins for the 2007 season. Bass played the entire season for the Triple-A Rochester Red Wings. Bass made 10 starts and 27 relief appearances, finishing the season 7–3 with a 3.48 ERA. Included in his 10 starts was a complete game shutout, the second in his career and the first since 2001. Bass became a minor league free agent after the season; but, was re-signed by the Twins to a major league contract on November 29, 2007.

Bass won a long relief role out of spring training with the Minnesota Twins. He made his major league debut on April 1 against the Los Angeles Angels of Anaheim, pitching 1.1 innings in relief in a 9–1 loss. Bass appeared in 44 games as a reliever for the Twins, going 3–4 with an ERA of 4.87 with one save before being sent outright to the minors on August 20.

=== Baltimore Orioles (2008–2009) ===
Bass was traded to the Baltimore Orioles on September 5, 2008, for a PTBNL or cash considerations.

On December 12, 2009, Bass was non-tendered by the Orioles, making him a free agent.

=== Pittsburgh Pirates (2010) ===
On January 12, 2010, Bass signed a minor-league contract with Pittsburgh which included an invitation to spring training. He appeared in four games and was designated for assignment on September 13.

=== Philadelphia Phillies (2011) ===
On January 6, 2011, Bass signed a minor league contract with the Philadelphia Phillies.

=== Hanwha Eagles (2012) ===
On January 18, 2012, Bass signed with the Hanwha Eagles of the Korea Baseball Organization. However, he was sent to their minor leagues and released after just a few games.

=== Houston Astros (2012) ===
On May 27, 2012, Bass signed with the Houston Astros, and he was assigned to the Triple-A Oklahoma City RedHawks. In 17 games (13 starts) with the RedHawks, Bass went 2–5 with a 5.56 ERA.

=== Philadelphia Phillies (second stint) (2013) ===
On January 16, 2013, Bass signed a minor league contract to return to the Phillies.

=== Camden Riversharks (2013) ===
On May 10, 2013, Bass signed with the Camden Riversharks of the Atlantic League of Professional Baseball. Bass retired on July 6, 2013. In 14 starts 75 innings he struggled going 2–10 with a 5.88 ERA with 58 strikeouts.

== Coaching career ==
On October 9, 2013, Bass accepted the pitching coach job at Stevenson University. He left after the 2019 season.
