= Howie Clark =

American baseball player (born 1974)

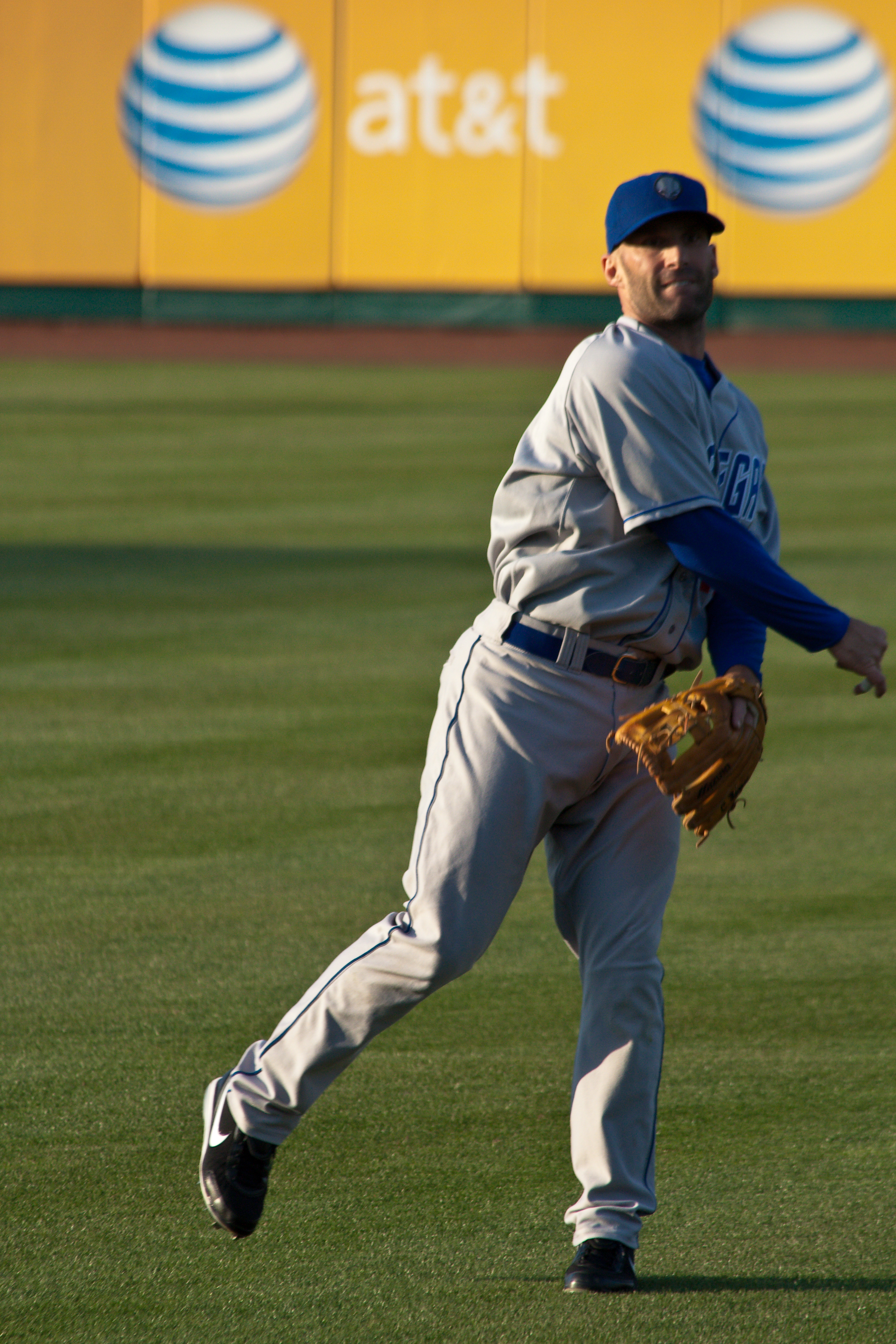
- Clark with the Las Vegas 51s in 2009
- Utility player / Coach
- Born: February 13, 1974 (age 52); San Diego, California, U.S.
- Batted: Left Threw: Right

MLB debut
- July 16, 2002, for the Baltimore Orioles

Last MLB appearance
- May 18, 2008, for the Minnesota Twins

MLB statistics
- Batting average: .262
- Home runs: 3
- Runs batted in: 26
- Stats at Baseball Reference

Teams
- As player: Baltimore Orioles (2002); Toronto Blue Jays (2003–2004); Baltimore Orioles (2006); Toronto Blue Jays (2007); Minnesota Twins (2008); As coach: Baltimore Orioles (2017–2019); Chicago White Sox (2021–2022)

Howard Roddy Clark (born February 13, 1974) is an American professional baseball coach and former utility player. He played in Major League Baseball (MLB) for the Baltimore Orioles, Toronto Blue Jays, and Minnesota Twins, and coached for the Orioles and Chicago White Sox. He is currently the hitting coach for the Memphis Redbirds.

== Playing career ==
Clark was selected by the Baltimore Orioles in the 27th round (744th overall) of the 1992 Major League Baseball draft. He would spend ten years in Baltimore's minor league system before making an appearance in the majors. During this time, Clark played in parts of four seasons with the Rochester Red Wings, the Orioles' Triple-A affiliate, from 1998 to 2002 and was named the team captain. After his contract was purchased by the Orioles on July 16, 2002, he finally made his major-league debut as a designated hitter batting leadoff that same day in a 6–1 victory over the Seattle Mariners at Camden Yards. He was given a standing ovation after his first at bat resulted in a double off Joel Piñeiro. Clark eventually scored the first run of the contest. He played in 14 games with the Orioles in his first major league action, batting .302 with 4 RBI. He became a free agent after the 2002 season and signed with the Toronto Blue Jays on November 12, 2002.

After two seasons with the Blue Jays, Clark signed a minor league contract with the Pittsburgh Pirates on November 1, 2004. He spent the 2005 season with the Rookie-level Gulf Coast League Pirates and the Double-A Altoona Curve, batting a combined .394 with two home runs and 17 RBI in 39 games. Clark re-signed with Baltimore before the 2006 season. Clark played most of the year with their Triple-A affiliate, the Ottawa Lynx, but was called up to Baltimore for a brief stretch during the months of June and July. He played in seven games, recording one hit in seven at-bats (.143).

Clark signed with the San Diego Padres on January 10, 2007. He was released at the end of Spring Training on March 31. On May 12, Clark signed a contract to return to the Blue Jays.

On May 30, 2007, while playing third base for the Blue Jays, Clark let an easy pop fly fall after Alex Rodriguez yelled "Mine" in order to distract the infielders. Sports telecasts aired this play numerous times in the following days as part of discussions on Rodriguez's poor sportsmanship.

Clark was cited in the 2007 Mitchell Report on performance-enhancing drugs in baseball, but was later acquitted when it was discovered his GH was bunk because he bought it from a false Mexican source.

Clark was outrighted to Triple-A by the Blue Jays on August 7, 2007. He then signed a minor league contract with the Minnesota Twins on November 21, 2007. He began the 2008 season with the Rochester Red Wings, now the Triple-A affiliate of the Twins. Clark was called up to Minnesota on May 16 to replace the injured Matt Tolbert, but was designated for assignment to Rochester on May 31. He accepted the assignment, stating that one of his reasons for returning to Rochester was his good relationship with the fans. He became a free agent at the end of the season and signed a minor league contract with the Toronto Blue Jays on January 16, 2009.

== Coaching career ==
In February 2015, Clark was named the hitting coach of the Delmarva Shorebirds, the Class-A affiliate of the Baltimore Orioles. In February 2017, Clark was named the assistant hitting coach for the Orioles. He was not retained by the ballclub following the 2019 season. He was named hitting coach of the Charlotte Knights, Triple-A affiliate of the Chicago White Sox, for the 2020 season. On December 1, 2020, Clark was named assistant hitting coach for the Chicago White Sox. In January 2023, Clark became the hitting coach of the Memphis Redbirds, Triple-A affiliate of the St. Louis Cardinals.

== See also ==
- List of Major League Baseball players named in the Mitchell Report
