= J. C. Romero =

Puerto Rican baseball player (born 1976)

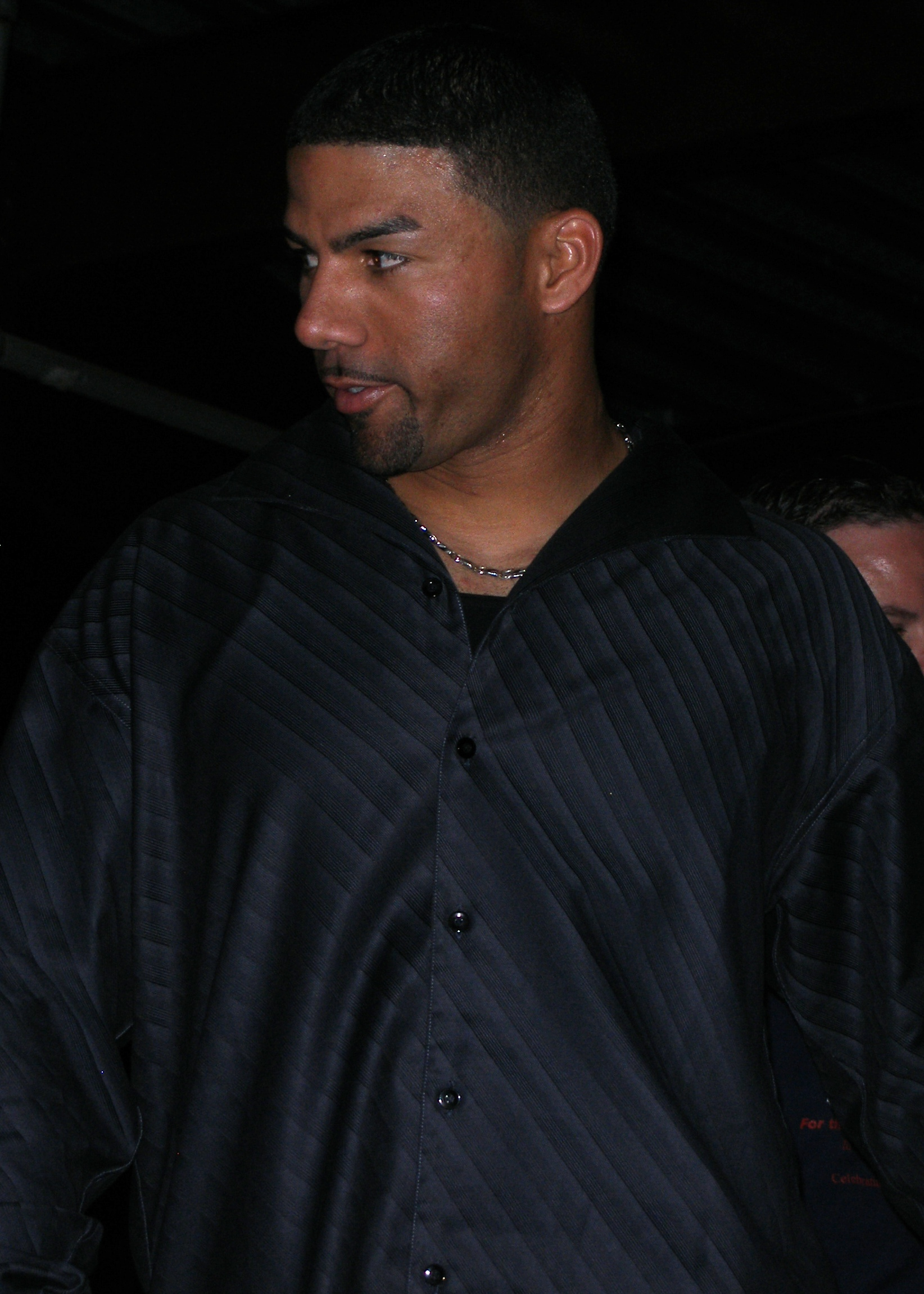
- Romero at Phillies Photo Day in 2008
- Pitcher
- Born: June 4, 1976 (age 49); Rio Piedras, Puerto Rico
- Batted: Switch Threw: Left

MLB debut
- September 15, 1999, for the Minnesota Twins

Last MLB appearance
- August 22, 2012, for the Baltimore Orioles

MLB statistics
- Win–loss record: 34–28
- Earned run average: 4.16
- Strikeouts: 526
- Stats at Baseball Reference

Teams
- Minnesota Twins (1999–2005); Los Angeles Angels of Anaheim (2006); Boston Red Sox (2007); Philadelphia Phillies (2007–2011); Colorado Rockies (2011); St. Louis Cardinals (2012); Baltimore Orioles (2012)

Career highlights and awards
- World Series champion (2008)
Medals
Men's baseball
Representing United States
Pan American Games
Silver medal – second place	1999 Winnipeg	Team
Representing Puerto Rico
World Baseball Classic
Silver medal – second place	2013 San Francisco	Team
Silver medal – second place	2017 Los Angeles	Team

Juan Carlos Romero (born June 4, 1976) is a Puerto Rican former professional baseball pitcher. He played in Major League Baseball (MLB) for the Minnesota Twins, Los Angeles Angels of Anaheim, Boston Red Sox, Baltimore Orioles, Philadelphia Phillies, Colorado Rockies, and the St. Louis Cardinals.

== Playing career ==
Romero played college baseball at the University of Mobile. He was drafted by the Minnesota Twins in the 21st round of the 1997 MLB draft.

Romero was traded by the Twins to the Angels on December 9, 2005, for infielder Alexi Casilla.

Romero was one of the Puerto Rican players to agree to play for Puerto Rico in the 2006 World Baseball Classic.

On October 6, 2006, the Angels declined his contract option for 2007, making him a free agent. On December 15, he signed a one-year deal with the Boston Red Sox. However, on June 9, 2007, he was designated for assignment, and subsequently released on June 19.

=== Philadelphia Phillies ===
On June 23, 2007, Romero signed with the Philadelphia Phillies. Romero finished the 2007 season with a stellar ERA of 1.81 in 56.1 innings pitched. Romero improved a weak Phillies' bullpen plagued by inconsistency and injuries, which posted a 3.17 ERA in the final stretch of September. He also played a crucial role in the Phillies' triumph on the last day of the season, when in a 6–1 victory over the Washington Nationals that capped the team's comeback against the New York Mets, Romero pitched one inning and struck out two. Romero was named the Phillies' top reliever for the postseason. On September 10, 2007, Romero agreed to an multi-year deal to remain with the Phillies.

On October 29, 2008, Romero was the winning pitcher in Game 5 of the 2008 World Series, which clinched the first major championship in the city of Philadelphia in 25-years. Along with his win in Game 3, he became the first Puerto Rican pitcher to win two games in one World Series.

His club option for the 2011 season was declined by the Phillies at the end of the 2010 season, but he agreed to return to the team by signing a one-year contract. He was designated for assignment on June 16. and was released on June 24.

=== Drug suspension ===
Prior to the 2009 season, Romero was suspended 50-games for testing positive for androstenedione, a performance-enhancing drug banned by MLB. Romero said that he bought a supplement named 6-OXO Extreme from a GNC store at the Cherry Hill Mall in Cherry Hill, New Jersey, and that he was cleared to take it by two nutritionists. Romero actually tested positive on August 26, 2008, but he took the case to arbitration, allowing him to pitch in the postseason and World Series; after he stopped taking the supplement, he tested negative before the playoffs. Due to the suspension, Romero lost $1.25-million, so he sued the makers of the supplement Ergopharm, Inc, along with The Vitamin Shoppe and GNC for his lost salary and punitive damages. Following the 50-game suspension, Romero returned to the Phillies' Triple-A affiliate, the Lehigh Valley IronPigs in May 2009. Romero returned to the Phillies on June 3, 2009.

=== Washington Nationals ===
On June 29, 2011, Romero signed a minor league contract with the Washington Nationals. Only July 24, 2011, Romero was granted his release by the Nationals.

=== New York Yankees ===
On July 14, 2011, Romero signed a minor league contract with the New York Yankees. He made 11 appearances for the Triple-A Scranton/Wilkes-Barre Yankees, facing 55 batter, striking out 10, and allowing four earned runs. He requested and was granted his release from the Yankees on August 8.

=== Colorado Rockies ===
On August 15, 2011, Romero signed a major league contract with the Colorado Rockies.

=== St. Louis Cardinals ===
On December 15, 2011, Romero signed a one-year contract with the St. Louis Cardinals.

On May 14, 2012, Romero was released by the Cardinals.

=== Baltimore Orioles ===
On May 24, 2012, Romero signed a minor league contract with the Baltimore Orioles. He elected free agency on July 10.

=== Cleveland Indians ===
On July 21, 2012, Romero signed a minor league contract with the Cleveland Indians, and was assigned to the Triple-A Columbus Clippers.

=== Second stint with the Baltimore Orioles ===
On August 13, 2012 Romero was traded to the Baltimore Orioles for Triple-A infielder Carlos Rojas.

=== Second stint with the Washington Nationals ===
On March 22, 2013, Romero signed a minor league contract with an invitation to spring training with the Washington Nationals.

=== Pericos de Puebla ===
In 2015, after sitting out the entire 2014 season, he signed with the Pericos de Puebla of the Mexican League

== International career ==
=== World Baseball Classic (Puerto Rico) ===
Romero has appeared in three editions of the World Baseball Classic (2006, 2009, 2013) and did play for Team Puerto Rico in the 2017 World Baseball Classic, despite his retirement.

== Post Baseball ==
On July 9, 2017, Romero was on the Phillies radio broadcast team doing color commentary. He also is now a pitching coach in Alabama.

== See also ==
- List of Major League Baseball players from Puerto Rico
