= Bill Smith (baseball executive) =

Baseball executive from the United States

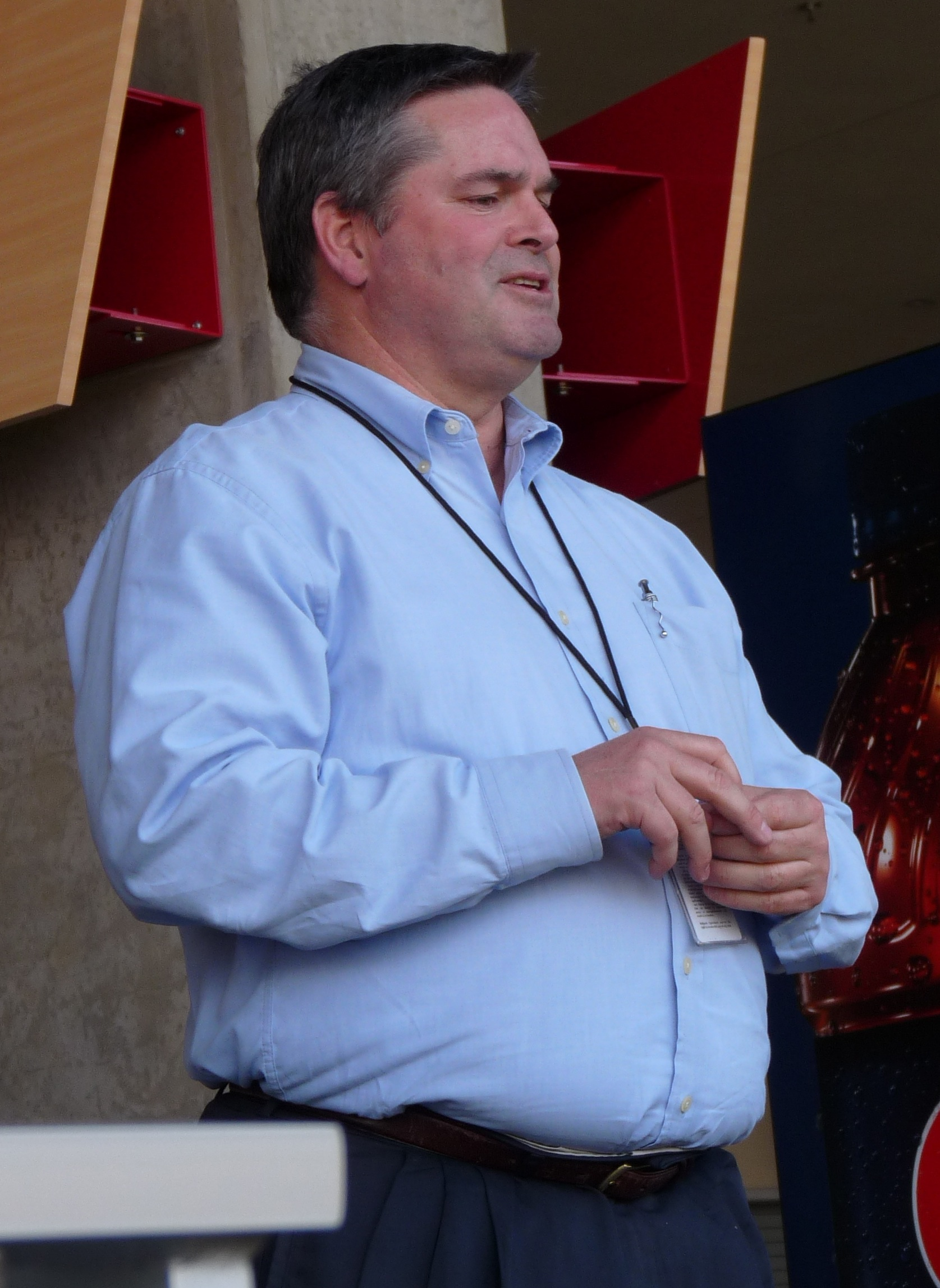
- Smith in 2010.
- Born: 1958 (age 67–68)
- Education: Hamilton College - 1980
- Spouse: Becky
- Children: 3

Bill Smith (born 1958) is an American sports executive, who served as the fifth general manager for the Minnesota Twins. He took over October 1, 2007 from longtime manager and mentor Terry Ryan. The Twins fired Smith as general manager on November 7, 2011, and replaced him with his predecessor, Ryan. Six weeks later, Smith was given a new role in the Minnesota organization as assistant to both GM Ryan and club president Dave St. Peter.

Smith graduated from Hamilton College in 1980.

After leaving the Minnesota Twins organization in January 2017 he became assistant to the president in the Minor League Baseball Office in May.

He lives in Bloomington, Minnesota, with his wife Becky and their three daughters.
