= Alexi Casilla =

Dominican baseball player (born 1984)

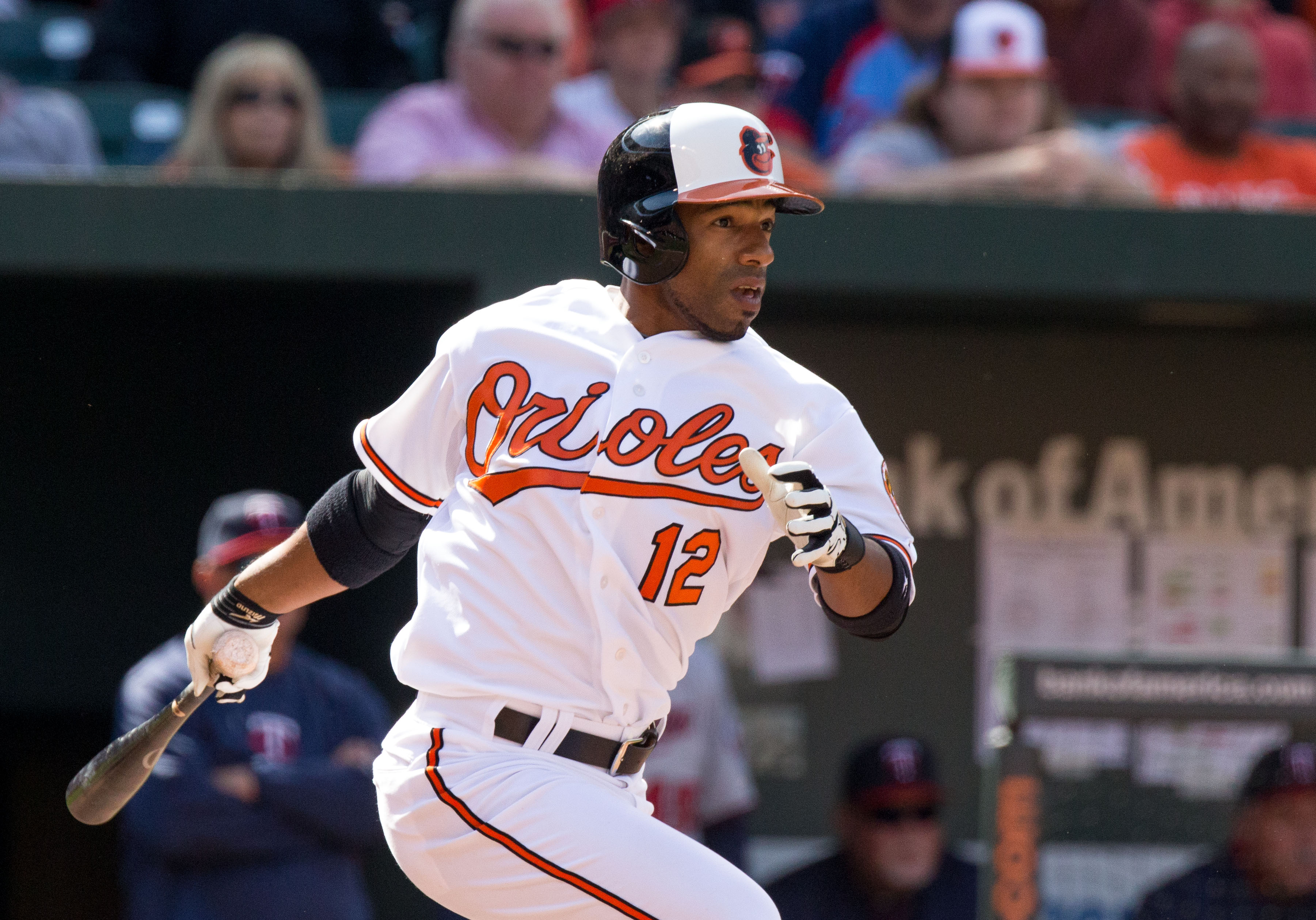
- Casilla with the Baltimore Orioles in 2013
- Second baseman
- Born: July 20, 1984 (age 42); San Cristóbal, Dominican Republic
- Batted: Switch Threw: Right

MLB debut
- September 1, 2006, for the Minnesota Twins

Last MLB appearance
- September 27, 2014, for the Baltimore Orioles

MLB statistics
- Batting average: .247
- Home runs: 12
- Runs batted in: 157
- Stats at Baseball Reference

Teams
- Minnesota Twins (2006–2012); Baltimore Orioles (2013–2014)

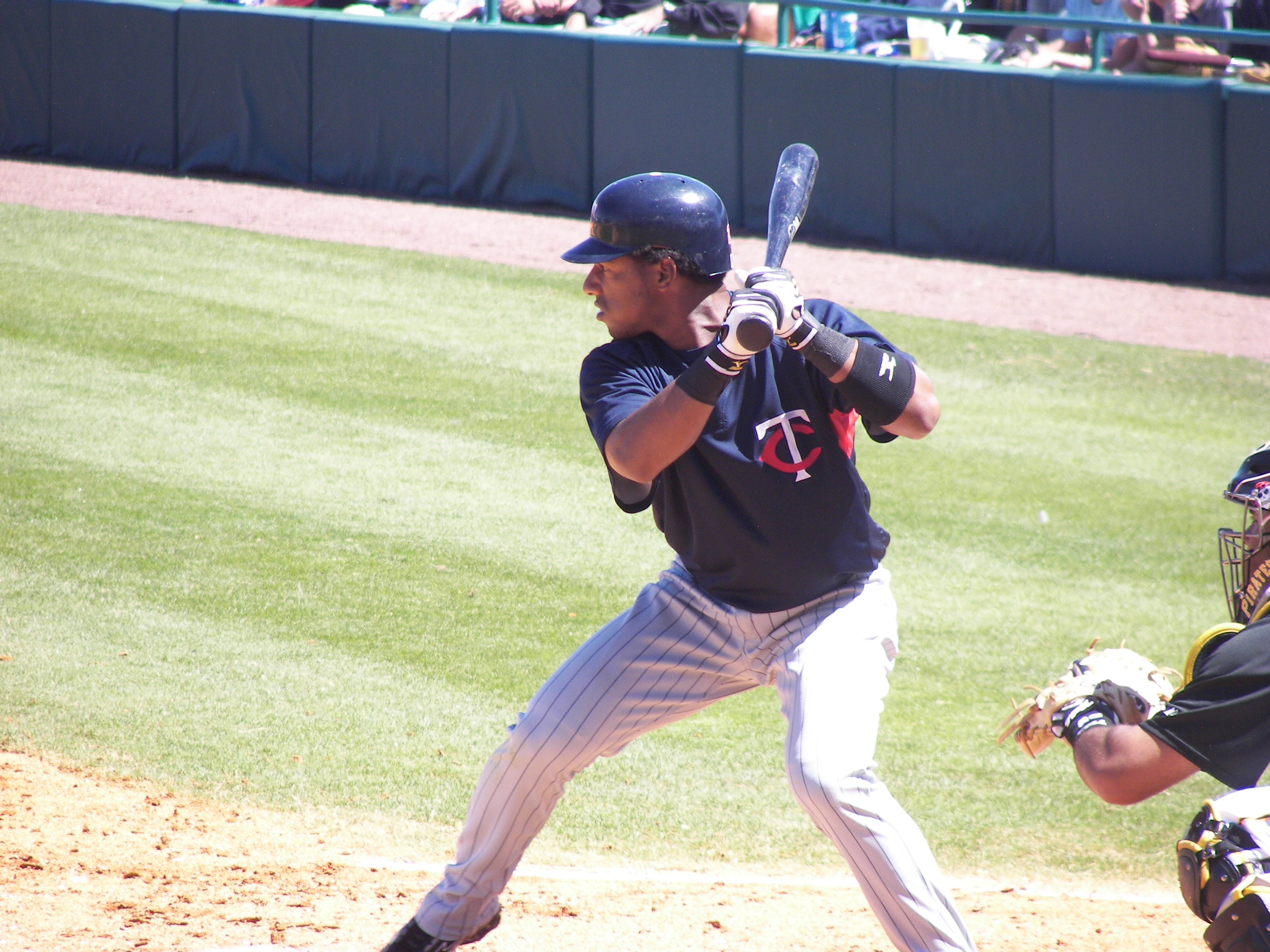
Casilla batting for the Minnesota Twins in 2007 spring training

Alexi Casilla Lora (born July 20, 1984) is a Dominican former professional baseball second baseman. He played in Major League Baseball (MLB) for the Minnesota Twins and Baltimore Orioles.

== Playing career ==
=== Minnesota Twins ===
Casilla was signed as a free agent by the Anaheim Angels in 2003. On December 9, 2005, the Angels traded Casilla to the Minnesota Twins for pitcher J. C. Romero. Casilla made his major league debut with the Twins on September 1, 2006, appearing as a pinch-hitter in the seventh inning and drawing a walk in his first plate appearance. In nine games with the Twins, Casilla was 1-for-4 (.250) with two walks.

In 2007, after a brief call-up with the Twins, Casilla became the everyday second baseman after Luis Castillo was traded to the New York Mets. Casilla struggled, producing a .222 batting average with no home runs and 9 runs batted in (RBI) in 56 games.

In 2008, Casilla did not make the Twins Opening Day roster and instead started for the Twins Triple-A affiliate, the Rochester Red Wings. After an injury to infielder Nick Punto, Casilla was called up in May. On May 19, 2008, Casilla hit a three-run homer, his first career MLB home run against Texas Rangers. It was also his first hit of the 2008 season. Casilla spent the rest of the 2008 season as the Twins' starting second baseman and second hitter in the lineup. He finished the season batting .281 with seven home runs and 50 RBI in 98 games.

Casilla struggled to begin the 2009 season. After hitting only .167 in his first 84 at-bats, he was optioned to Triple-A Rochester. He was recalled and had a .202 average, 17 RBI, a .280 on-base percentage, and a .259 slugging percentage in 80 games. He had the most at-bats without a home run in the AL.

In 2009, during the 2009 AL Central tie-breaker game featuring the Twins against the Detroit Tigers, Casilla became the unlikely hero, hitting a game-winning walk-off single to score Carlos Gómez from second base in the bottom of the 12th inning.

Prior to the 2010 season, Casilla changed his number from 25 to 12, giving number 25 to Jim Thome, who had worn the number for almost his entire 21-year career.

For most of the 2011 season, Casilla switched between second base and shortstop, sometimes filling in for Tsuyoshi Nishioka, who was injured for the first two months of the season. In 97 games, Casilla hit .260 with two home runs and 21 RBI.

Casilla made the Twins' Opening Day roster in 2012 and got off to a relatively slow start in his first 16 games. For the season, he played in a career high 106 games, hitting .241 with a home run and 30 RBI.

=== Baltimore Orioles ===
On November 2, 2012, Casilla was claimed off waivers by the Baltimore Orioles. On November 30, Casilla signed a one-year, $1.7 million deal with a club option for 2014 to avoid arbitration with Baltimore.

Casilla made the Opening Day roster with the Orioles in 2013. After Brian Roberts went down with an injury three games into the season, Casilla entered a platoon with Ryan Flaherty at second base. Through June, Casilla was hitting .222 with 8 RBI and 10 runs scored. When Roberts returned on June 30, Casilla's playing time drastically diminished, leading to only four appearances in all of July, and 20 appearances after June despite being healthy. In 62 games (31 starts) in 2013, Casilla hit .214 with a home run, 10 RBI and 15 runs scored. He did not make an error in 170 chances in the field, with 169 of those being at second base.

On November 4, Casilla had his $3 million club option declined, and was instead paid the $200,000 buyout, becoming a free agent.

On January 10, 2014, Casilla re-signed with the Orioles on a minor league contract. By April 17, he was replaced by Jonathan Schoop due to his strained hamstring.

=== Tampa Bay Rays ===
Casilla signed a minor league deal with the Tampa Bay Rays on February 2, 2015. He was released on March 31. The Rays re-signed him to a minor league contract on April 9.

=== Detroit Tigers ===
On June 29, 2015, the Tampa Bay Rays traded Casilla to the Detroit Tigers in exchange for a player to be named later. He elected free agency on November 6.

=== Toronto Blue Jays ===
On March 9, 2016, Casilla signed a minor league contract with the Toronto Blue Jays organization. In 83 games for the Triple–A Buffalo Bisons, he batted .241/.296/.319 with two home runs, 16 RBI, and five stolen bases. Casilla elected free agency following the season on November 7.

=== York Revolution ===
On May 24, 2017, Casilla signed with the York Revolution of the Atlantic League of Professional Baseball. On November 1, 2017, he became a free agent. In 62 games he hit .358/.410/.496 with 4 home runs, 34 RBIs and 6 stolen bases.

On February 16, 2018, Casilla re-signed with the Revolution. In 108 games he hit .336/.384/.418 with 3 home runs, 36 RBIs and 16 stolen bases.

He re-signed again for the 2019 season on February 27, 2019, and became a free agent after the season. In 32 games he hit .300/.331/.431 with 3 home runs, 9 RBIs and 1 stolen base.

== Coaching career ==
On January 16, 2024, Casilla was announced as the hitting coach for the Long Island Ducks of the Atlantic League of Professional Baseball.
