= Juan Rincón =

Venezuelan baseball player (born 1979)

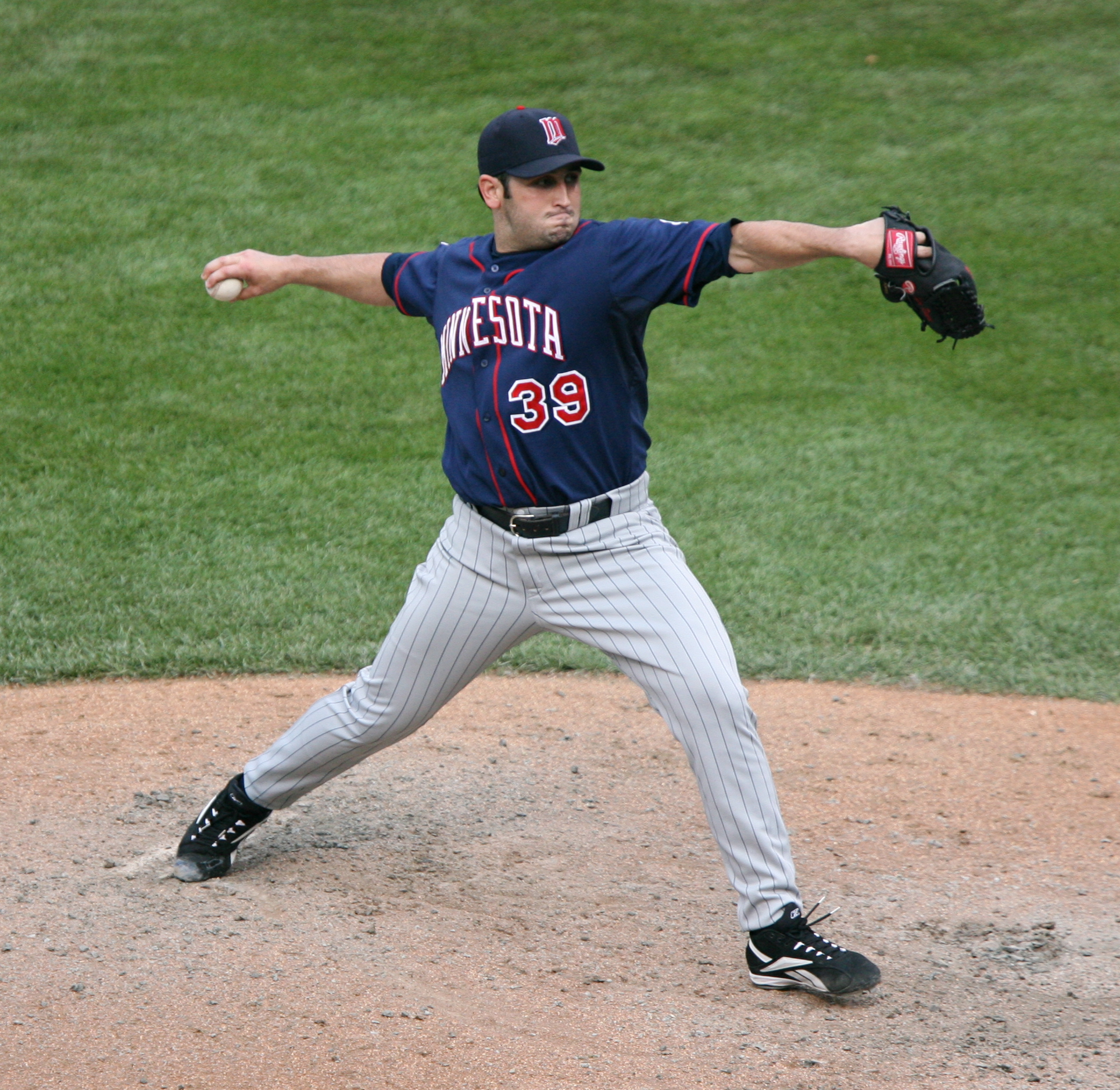
- Rincón with the Minnesota Twins
- Pitcher
- Born: January 23, 1979 (age 46); Maracaibo, Zulia State, Venezuela
- Batted: Right Threw: Right

MLB debut
- June 7, 2001, for the Minnesota Twins

Last MLB appearance
- June 20, 2010, for the Colorado Rockies

MLB statistics
- Win–loss record: 35–29
- Earned run average: 4.03
- Strikeouts: 469
- Stats at Baseball Reference

Teams
- Minnesota Twins (2001–2008); Cleveland Indians (2008); Detroit Tigers (2009); Colorado Rockies (2009–2010)

Juan Manuel Rincón (born January 23, 1979) is a Venezuelan professional baseball coach and former relief pitcher. Rincón bats and throws right-handed. He throws a low 90s fastball and a mid to low 80s slider. In his career, Rincón posted a .208 BAA against left-handed hitters and a .248 BAA against right-handed hitters.

== Career ==
=== Minnesota Twins ===
Rincón was originally signed by the Minnesota Twins as an amateur free agent in 1996. He worked his way up through the Twins farm system and was selected as a Midwest League All-Star in 1999 when he went 14–8 with a 2.92 ERA in 28 starts with the Single-A Quad Cities River Bandits.

Rincón made his major league debut with the Twins on June 7, 2001, against the Cleveland Indians, striking out two in a scoreless inning in relief. He spent eight seasons with the Twins, appearing in 386 games (three starts), ending with a 30–26 record and 3.69 ERA.

On May 2, 2005, Rincón became the fifth baseball player to be suspended for testing positive for illegal performance-enhancing drugs under Major League Baseball's drug policy. He was suspended for ten days without pay as the policy dictates for a first offense.

On June 12, 2008, Rincón was designated for assignment after refusing an outright assignment to the Triple-A Rochester Red Wings. He was released on June 22.

=== Cleveland Indians ===
Rincón signed a minor league contract with the Cleveland Indians on June 24, 2008. He was 1–1 with a 5.60 ERA in 23 appearances for the Indians.

=== Detroit Tigers ===
On January 20, 2009, Rincón was signed by the Detroit Tigers to a minor league contract. He made the major league roster after spring training, but was designated for assignment on May 13, 2009, to make room on the active roster for Dontrelle Willis. Rincón had three days to accept an outright assignment to the Triple-A Toledo Mud Hens or become a free agent. On May 17, 2009, Rincon rejected an assignment to Toledo and elected free agency. Rincon posted a 5.23 ERA and was 1–0 in seven appearances with the Tigers.

=== Colorado Rockies ===
On May 25, 2009, Rincón signed a minor league deal with the Colorado Rockies. He appeared in 26 games with the Rockies, going 3–2 with an ERA of 7.52.

Rincón was re-signed by the Rockies to a minor league deal on December 18, 2009. On May 1, 2010, he was designated for assignment to make room for spot starter Esmil Rogers. On May 3, he was assigned to the Triple-A Colorado Springs Sky Sox. He became a free agent on October 15 after he refused an assignment to the minor leagues.

=== Los Angeles Dodgers ===
On February 11, 2011, Rincón signed a minor league contract with the Los Angeles Dodgers. He was released at the conclusion of spring training and signed with the Bridgeport Bluefish of the Atlantic League of Professional Baseball, where he went 2–1 with 23 saves and a 2.98 ERA in 42 relief appearances.

=== Los Angeles Angels ===
Rincón signed a split contract with the Los Angeles Angels on February 24, 2012, which did not include an invitation to spring training. Rincón hired Burton Rocks as his agent in 2013 to seek a job as player/coach with a big league organization.

== Coaching ==
On February 23, 2016, the Toronto Blue Jays hired Rincón to be their new pitching coach for the Gulf Coast Blue Jays, their rookie team, for the 2016 season.

== See also ==
- List of doping cases in sport
- List of Major League Baseball players from Venezuela
