= Bobby Korecky =

American baseball player (born 1979)

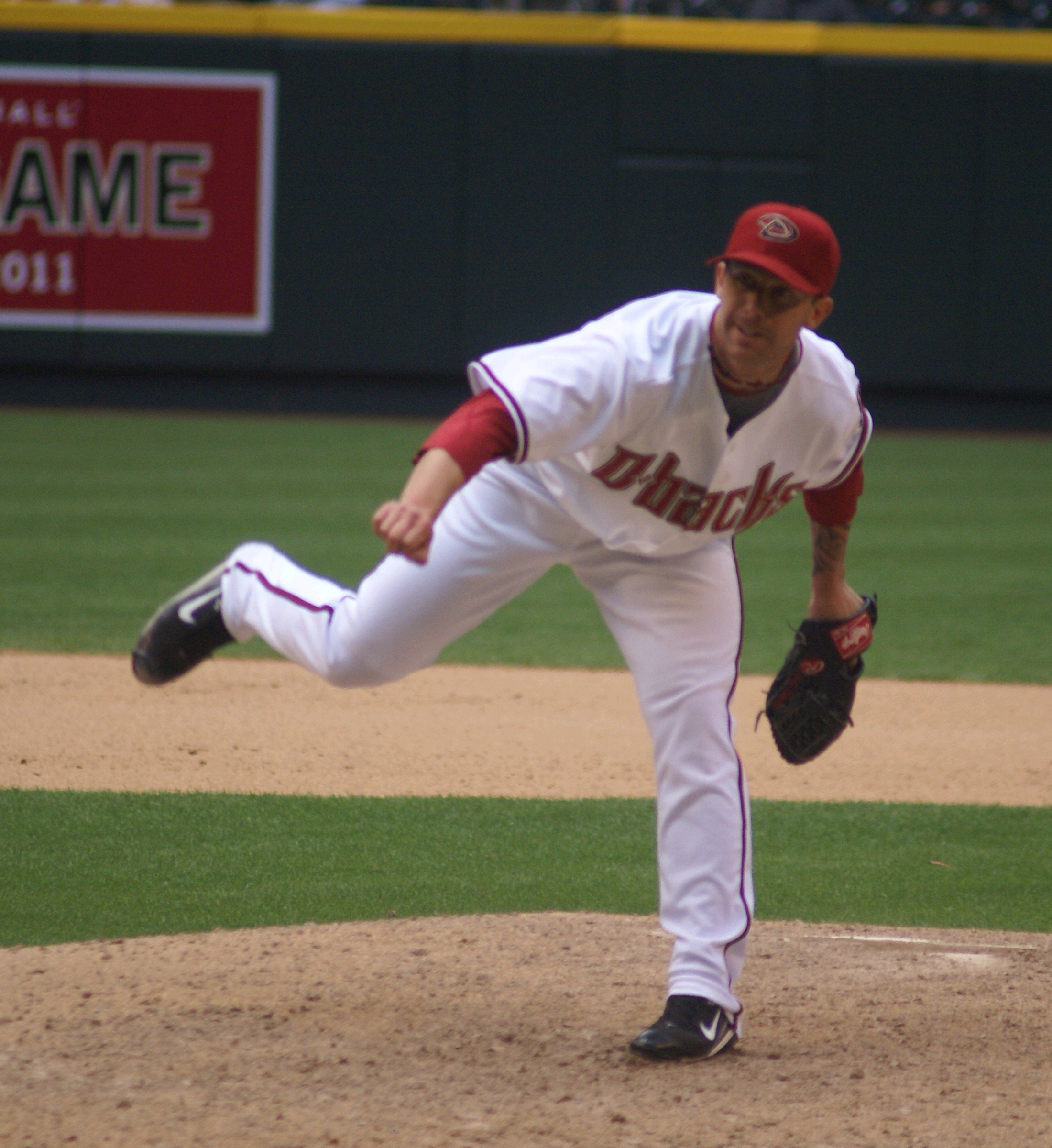
- Korecky with the Arizona Diamondbacks
- Relief pitcher
- Born: September 16, 1979 (age 47); Hillside, New Jersey, U.S.
- Batted: Right Threw: Right

MLB debut
- April 26, 2008, for the Minnesota Twins

Last MLB appearance
- June 11, 2014, for the Toronto Blue Jays

MLB statistics
- Win–loss record: 2–0
- Earned run average: 7.39
- Strikeouts: 11
- Stats at Baseball Reference

Teams
- Minnesota Twins (2008); Arizona Diamondbacks (2009); Toronto Blue Jays (2012, 2014)

Robert John Korecky (born September 16, 1979) is an American former professional baseball relief pitcher. He played in Major League Baseball (MLB) for the Minnesota Twins, Arizona Diamondbacks, and Toronto Blue Jays.

== High school ==
Korecky graduated from Saline High School (Michigan) in 1998, where he led the Hornets to the Division 1 state championship game. During his senior season, he led the team with an 11–1 record on the mound with a 1.43 Earned run average and 118 strikeouts in 78 1/3 innings pitched. Korecky also had a .516 batting average striking out only once in 155 at bats on his way to setting the Michigan High School Baseball record for most hits in a season with 80.

== College ==
Korecky is a graduate of the University of Michigan, which he attended for four years. His best season came in 2001, when he went 6–4 with a 3.39 ERA over 12 starts and one relief appearance. In 2001, he played collegiate summer baseball in the Cape Cod Baseball League for the Chatham A's, and returned to the league in 2002 to play for the Yarmouth-Dennis Red Sox.

== Professional career ==
=== Philadelphia Phillies ===
Korecky was drafted by the Philadelphia Phillies in the 19th round (569th overall) in the 2002 Major League Baseball draft. He split his first professional season between the Single–A for the Batavia Muckdogs and the Lakewood BlueClaws, going a combined 4–4 with one save and a 2.61 ERA in 15 games (nine starts).

In 2003, Korecky pitched for the Single–A Clearwater Phillies. Converting full-time to a relief pitcher, Korecky went 5–4 with a 2.26 ERA in 49 relief appearances, and led the team with 25 saves as their primary closer.

=== Minnesota Twins ===
On December 17, 2003, Korecky was traded to the Minnesota Twins as a player to be named later, completing an earlier trade that sent Carlos Silva and Nick Punto to the Twins for Eric Milton.

In 2004, Korecky played for the Double–A New Britain Rock Cats and served as their closer. Making a team-high 55 relief appearances, he went 3–4 with a 3.36 ERA and had 31 saves. Korecky was also named to the Eastern League postseason All-Star game. Korecky played for the Rock Cats again in 2005, but was limited to just two games after undergoing Tommy John surgery.

Korecky returned in 2006 and played for the Rock Cats again and the Triple-A Rochester Red Wings. In a combined 50 games, he went 6–5 with 13 saves and a 3.30 ERA. In 2007, Korecky played for the Red Wings again. Appearing in a career high 66 games, he went 5–6 with a career-high 35 saves and a 3.71 ERA. Korecky was named to the International League midseason All-Star game that year. On November 20, 2007, Korecky's contract was purchased by the Twins, protecting him from the Rule 5 Draft.

On April 25, 2008, Korecky was promoted to Minnesota from Rochester for the first time when All-Star Francisco Liriano was sent down. He made his Major League debut April 26 against the Texas Rangers, pitching one inning, giving up one run on one hit and two walks.

In only his sixth major league appearance, on May 19, 2008, he made a name for himself in the Twins organization by becoming the first Twins pitcher to get a hit in an American League game since the introduction of the designated hitter, while also picking up his first major league victory in a 7–6, 12-inning victory over the Texas Rangers. The hit—and the at-bat—occurred in the only ML plate appearance of Korecky's career.

=== Arizona Diamondbacks ===
On February 18, 2009, Korecky was claimed off waivers by the Arizona Diamondbacks. He pitched five games in relief for Arizona in 2009, posting a 13.50 ERA.

=== Winnipeg Goldeyes ===
Korecky signed as a free agent with the Los Angeles Angels of Anaheim on February 9, 2010. However, the Angels were unaware that Korecky had surgery while with Arizona, and they released him on May 27. He subsequently spent the season with the independent Winnipeg Goldeyes of the Northern League, going 0–2 with 10 saves and a 5.32 ERA in 23 relief appearances.

=== Toronto Blue Jays ===
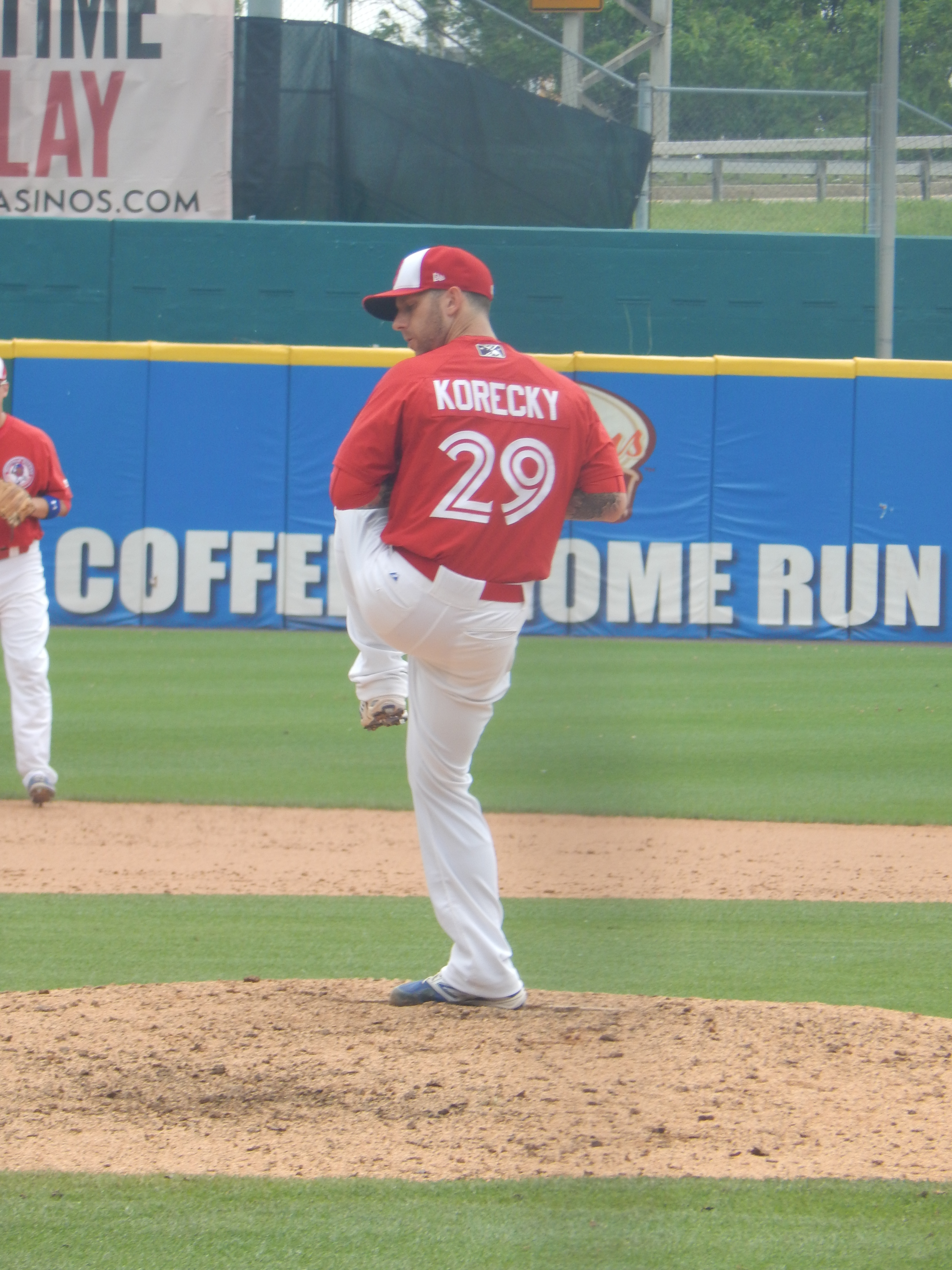
Korecky pitching for the Bisons on June 11, 2015

Korecky signed a minor league contract with the Toronto Blue Jays on March 6, 2011. He split the 2011 season between the Double–A New Hampshire Fisher Cats and the Triple–A Las Vegas 51s, posting a 4–3 record with 13 saves and a 2.04 ERA in 44 combined appearances. He appeared in one game for the Blue Jays in the 2012 season, and spent the rest of that season with the 51s.

On October 4, 2012, Korecky was outrighted to the Blue Jays' Triple-A affiliate, the Buffalo Bisons. He became a free agent on October 10.

On April 6, 2013, Korecky was assigned to Triple–A Buffalo. On April 8, he was placed on the disabled list. He was activated from the disabled list on April 16.

The Blue Jays re-signed Korecky on December 16, 2013. His contract was selected from Triple-A Buffalo on May 30, 2014. Korecky retired the four Kansas City Royals batters that he faced that night, and he was then placed on optional waivers in order to send him back to Buffalo. He was designated for assignment on July 11 to make room for Dan Johnson on the Blue Jays' 40-man roster. After clearing waivers, he was assigned to the Bisons again on July 13. Korecky made just two appearances for Toronto in 2014, posting an 8.10 ERA with two strikeouts in 3 1/3 innings pitched. He elected free agency after the season ended.

Korecky signed another minor league deal with the Blue Jays on November 1, 2014. He elected free agency on November 7, 2015.

On November 9, 2015, Korecky re–signed with the Blue Jays organization on a new minor league contract. In 13 appearances for Triple–A Buffalo, he compiled a 4.30 ERA with 21 strikeouts across 23 innings pitched. Korecky elected free agency following the season on November 7, 2016.
