= 2007 Minnesota Twins season =

2007 Minnesota Twins
- League: American League
- Division: Central
- Ballpark: Hubert H. Humphrey Metrodome
- City: Minneapolis
- Record: 79–83
- Divisional place: 3rd
- Owners: Carl Pohlad
- General managers: Terry Ryan, Bill Smith
- Managers: Ron Gardenhire
- Television: FSN North; WFTC (My 29) (Dick Bremer, Bert Blyleven)
- Radio: AM 1500 KSTP (John Gordon, Dan Gladden, Jack Morris, Kris Atteberry)
- Stats: ESPN.com; Baseball Reference

The 2007 Minnesota Twins season was the 47th season for the Minnesota Twins franchise in the Twin Cities of Minnesota, their 26th season at Hubert H. Humphrey Metrodome and the 107th overall in the American League. They were managed by Ron Gardenhire.

The Twins finished the season with a 79–83 record, their first losing record since 2000.

On September 13, Twins general manager Terry Ryan resigned. He was replaced by Assistant General Manager Bill Smith.

== Offseason ==
- January 11, 2007: Agreed to terms with Ramón Ortiz on a one-year contract.
- February 2, 2007: Re-signed Justin Morneau, Lew Ford and Juan Rincón to one-year contracts and Nick Punto to a two-year contract.
- February 11, 2007: Agreed to terms with Joe Mauer on a four-year contract.

== Regular season ==
For the third year in a row, an important Twins personality died just before the beginning of the season. In 2005, long-time stadium announcer Bob Casey fell to heart failure. In 2006, Hall of Fame center fielder Kirby Puckett died from a massive bilateral stroke brought on by hypertension. In 2007, Herb Carneal, the team's radio play-by-play announcer for 45 years, died from heart failure on April 1, the day before Opening Day. The Twins announced that they would dedicate the 2007 season to Carneal's memory.

- With a first-inning 'E4' on June 6, the Twins' Luis Castillo's major league record for consecutive errorless games by a second baseman ended at 143. Over 647 chances, he never erred. Detroit's Plácido Polanco had a similar streak running concurrently, and it ended a few months later at 186 games, the new record.
- The Twins' representatives to the All-Star Game were Morneau, Hunter, and Santana. Reliever Pat Neshek was chosen to be one of five players in the final vote for an All-Star player. However, this spot went to Boston Red Sox pitcher Hideki Okajima, despite a campaign by Twins fans and national sports blogs to "Vote For Pat".
- The collapse of the I-35W Mississippi River bridge occurred prior to the August 1, 2007 home game against the Kansas City Royals at the Metrodome. Public safety officials told the team that canceling the game could hamper rescue and recovery efforts, since a cancellation would send up to 25,000 people back into traffic just blocks from the collapsed bridge (I-35W runs behind the Metrodome). Before the game, a moment of silence was held for the victims of the collapse. The team rescheduled their August 2 game against the Royals to the afternoon of August 31. Traditional groundbreaking ceremonies for the team's forthcoming stadium (also located in downtown Minneapolis) had been scheduled to take place after the game, but were postponed to August 30.
- Johan Santana broke the club record for most strikeouts in a game, with 17 against the Texas Rangers on August 19, 2007.
- On September 7, the Twins and the Chicago White Sox entered the ninth inning tied 4-4 and left the inning tied 10-10. It's the first time in the major leagues that both teams each scored six runs each in the ninth to force extra innings. Chicago won 11–10 after thirteen innings.
- With the loss to Boston on September 28, the Twins were assured of a losing season, the first after six straight winners (a record). Before those six, they'd suffered through eight consecutive losing years (also a record).
- Torii Hunter won his seventh straight Gold Glove award, the most for any position player on the Twins, and second in club history only to pitcher Jim Kaat's eleven.

=== Offense ===
While the 2006 team was known for the "piranhas"—gritty hitters lacking power but possessing speed and guile—the 2007 team saw the continued the development of power hitters such as 2006 league MVP Justin Morneau, Torii Hunter, and Jason Kubel. After the Twins swept a July 6 doubleheader with the Chicago White Sox by a combined score of 32–14, White Sox manager Ozzie Guillén, the man who coined the term "piranhas" in 2006, stated: "They're not piranhas no more. They're a shark attack now." In the second game of that doubleheader, Morneau became the first Twin to hit three home runs in a game since Tony Oliva against the Kansas City Royals on July 3, 1973. The Twins scored the most runs by one team in a doubleheader since the Boston Red Sox totaled 35 in a sweep of the Philadelphia Athletics on July 4, 1939. Nick Punto, as of August 22, 2007 has the lowest batting average among qualified batters in the American League, at .201.

=== Pitching ===
The Twins entered the season with a problem in the starting rotation after Twins staple Brad Radke retired and Francisco Liriano had Tommy John surgery. The Twins signed Ramón Ortiz and Sidney Ponson to start. Ponson was released in May and was replaced by Scott Baker, Ramón Ortiz was moved to the bullpen shortly after and replaced in the rotation by Kevin Slowey. However, Slowey was sent to the minors in early July, replaced by Matt Garza. Ramón Ortiz was traded in August to the Colorado Rockies. On August 31, Baker took a perfect game into the ninth inning against the Kansas City Royals, before giving up a leadoff walk to catcher John Buck. His no-hitter also ended when he gave up a 1-out single to Mike Sweeney in the 9th inning. The game was won by the Twins 5–0.

Starter Johan Santana won a Gold Glove Award, the only one of his career.

=== Season standings ===
AL Central
Team	W	L	Pct.	GB	Home	Road
Cleveland Indians	96	66	.593	—	51‍–‍29	45‍–‍37
Detroit Tigers	88	74	.543	8	45‍–‍36	43‍–‍38
Minnesota Twins	79	83	.488	17	41‍–‍40	38‍–‍43
Chicago White Sox	72	90	.444	24	38‍–‍43	34‍–‍47
Kansas City Royals	69	93	.426	27	35‍–‍46	34‍–‍47

=== Record vs. opponents ===
2007 American League record Source: MLB Standings Grid – 2007
Team	BAL	BOS	CWS	CLE	DET	KC	LAA	MIN	NYY	OAK	SEA	TB	TEX	TOR	NL
Baltimore	—	6–12	5–3	3–4	1–5	7–0	3–7	0–7	9–9	4–4	2–7	11–7	4–6	8–10	6–12
Boston	12–6	—	7–1	5–2	3–4	3–3	6–4	4–3	8–10	4–4	4–5	13–5	6–4	9–9	12–6
Chicago	3–5	1–7	—	7–11	11–7	12–6	5–4	9–9	4–6	4–5	1–7	6–1	2–4	3–4	4–14
Cleveland	4–3	2–5	11–7	—	12–6	11–7	5–5	14–4	0–6	6–4	4–3	8–2	6–3	4–2	9–9
Detroit	5–1	4–3	7–11	6–12	—	11–7	3–5	12–6	4–4	4–6	6–4	3–4	5–4	4–3	14–4
Kansas City	0–7	3–3	6–12	7–11	7–11	—	5–2	9–9	1–9	6–4	3–6	4–3	5–4	3–4	10–8
Los Angeles	7–3	4–6	4–5	5–5	5–3	2–5	—	6–3	6–3	9–10	13–6	6–2	10–9	3–4	14–4
Minnesota	7–0	3–4	9–9	4–14	6–12	9–9	3–6	—	2–5	5–2	6–3	3–4	7–2	4–6	11–7
New York	9–9	10–8	6–4	6–0	4–4	9–1	3–6	5–2	—	2–4	5–5	10–8	5–1	10–8	10–8
Oakland	4–4	4–4	5–4	4–6	6–4	4–6	10–9	2–5	4–2	—	5–14	4–6	9–10	5–4	10–8
Seattle	7–2	5–4	7–1	3–4	4–6	6–3	6–13	3–6	5–5	14–5	—	4–3	11–8	4–5	9–9
Tampa Bay	7–11	5–13	1–6	2–8	4–3	3–4	2–6	4–3	8–10	6–4	3–4	—	5–4	9–9	7–11
Texas	6–4	4–6	4–2	3–6	4–5	4–5	9–10	2–7	1–5	10–9	8–11	4–5	—	5–5	11–7
Toronto	10–8	9–9	4–3	2–4	3–4	4–3	4–3	6–4	8–10	4–5	5–4	9–9	5–5	—	10–8

=== Notable transactions ===
After their great amount of success in 2006, in which they came from behind to win the AL Central, the Twins wanted to be sure to lock up their 3-4-5 hitters (Joe Mauer, Michael Cuddyer, and Justin Morneau) to multi-year deals. The Twins were able to sign Mauer to a four-year deal worth $33 million, but Morneau and Cuddyer only agreed to sign one-year contracts, worth $4.5 million and $3.575 million respectively.

- April 9 – Placed Jeff Cirillo (medial meniscus tear in left knee) on the 15-day disabled list, retroactive to April 9; Placed Rondell White (strained right calf) on the 15-day disabled list, retroactive to April 5; Recalled Alexi Casilla from Triple-A Rochester.
- April 12 – Recalled Glen Perkins from Triple-A Rochester; optioned Chris Heintz.
- May 1 – Activated Jeff Cirillo from the 15-day disabled list and optioned Alexi Casilla to Triple-A Rochester.
- May 6 – Placed Joe Mauer on the 15-day disabled list with a strained left quad.
- May 8 – Recalled Chris Heintz from Triple-A Rochester.
- May 13 – Designated Sidney Ponson for assignment.
- May 16 – Placed Jesse Crain on the 15-day disabled list with right shoulder inflammation and recalled Julio DePaula from Triple-A Rochester.
- May 18 – Recalled Scott Baker from Triple-A Rochester. and optioned Garrett Jones to Rochester.
- May 22 – Placed Glen Perkins on the 15-day disabled list with a mild muscle strain in the back of his left shoulder; Purchased the contract of Carmen Cali from Triple-A Rochester.
- May 24 – Placed Dennys Reyes on the 15-day disabled list, retroactive to May 21, with inflammation in his left shoulder; Purchased the contract of Jason Miller from Triple-A Rochester and transferred Alejandro Machado from the 15-day to the 60-day disabled list.
- May 30 – Optioned Julio DePaula to Triple-A Rochester; Transferred Jesse Crain to the 60-day disabled list; purchased the contract of Kevin Slowey from Triple-A Rochester.
- June 28–29 – Heintz sent to minors; Matt Garza recalled.
- July 5 – Sent Slowey to minors; recalled Cali.
- July 22 – Activated Rondell White from the disabled list and optioned Garrett Jones to Triple-A Rochester.
- July 30 – Traded Luis Castillo to the New York Mets in exchange for minor leaguers Drew Butera and Dustin Martin. Recalled Alexi Casilla.
- August 3 – Jeff Cirillo claimed by Arizona on waivers.
- August 8 – Called up Tommy Watkins. Brian Buscher put on the 15-day DL.
- August 15 – Traded Ramón Ortiz to the Colorado Rockies for minor league infielder Matt Macri

=== Game log ===
2007 game log
April: 14–11

#	Date	Opponent	Score	Win	Loss	Save	Attendance	Record
1	April 2	Orioles	7–4	Santana (1–0)	Bédard (0–1)	Nathan (1)	48,711	1–0
2	April 3	Orioles	3–2	Neshek (1–0)	Cabrera (0–1)	Nathan (2)	24,439	2–0
3	April 4	Orioles	7–2	Ortiz (1–0)	Wright (0–1)		27,539	3–0
--	April 6	@ White Sox	Postponed (cold weather) rescheduled for July 6					3–0
4	April 7	@ White Sox	3–0	Vázquez (1–0)	Silva (0–1)	Jenks (1)	33,278	3–1
5	April 8	@ White Sox	3–1	Santana (2–0)	Danks (0–1)	Nathan (3)	27,653	4–1
6	April 9	Yankees	8–2	Pavano (1–0)	Ponson (0–1)		26,047	4–2
7	April 10	Yankees	10–1	Pettitte (1–0)	Bonser (0–1)		24,552	4–3
8	April 11	Yankees	5–1	Ortiz (2–0)	Farnsworth (0–1)		30,131	5–3
9	April 12	Devil Rays	3–2	Nathan (1–0)	Stokes (0–2)		15,869	6–3
10	April 13	Devil Rays	4–2	Kazmir (2–0)	Santana (2–1)	Reyes (3)	27,783	6–4
11	April 14	Devil Rays	12–5	Ponson (1–1)	Jackson (0–2)		35,269	7–4
12	April 15	Devil Rays	6–4	Stokes (1–2)	Nathan (1–1)	Reyes (4)	27,024	7–5
13	April 17	@ Mariners	11–2	Ortiz (3–0)	Weaver (0–2)		19,015	8–5
14	April 18	@ Mariners	5–4	Silva (1–1)	Hernández (2–1)	Nathan (4)	20,871	9–5
15	April 19	@ Mariners	6–5	Santana (3–1)	Washburn (0–2)	Nathan (5)	19,350	10–5
16	April 20	@ Royals	11–7	Pérez (1–2)	Ponson (1–2)	Riske (2)	31,813	10–6
17	April 21	@ Royals	7–5	Neshek (2–0)	Peralta (0–2)	Nathan (6)	20,566	11–6
18	April 22	@ Royals	3–1	de la Rosa (2–1)	Ortiz (3–1)	Soria (2)	14,801	11–7
19	April 23	Indians	7–3 (12)	Hernández (2–1)	Crain (0–1)		16,076	11–8
20	April 24	Indians	5–3	Carmona (1–1)	Santana (3–2)	Borowski (8)	20,849	11–9
21	April 25	Royals	4–3	Pérez (2–2)	Ponson (1–3)	Soria (3)	21,496	11–10
22	April 26	Royals	1–0 (11)	Rincón (1–0)	Wellemeyer (0–1)		18,520	12–10
23	April 27	@ Tigers	5–3	Crain (1–1)	Zumaya (0–1)	Nathan (7)	31,147	13–10
24	April 28	@ Tigers	11–3	Silva (2–1)	Verlander (1–1)		39,547	14–10
25	April 29	@ Tigers	4–3	Jones (1–1)	Crain (1–2)		36,483	14–11

May: 13–14

#	Date	Opponent	Score	Win	Loss	Save	Attendance	Record
26	May 1	@ Devil Rays	9–1	Ponson (2–3)	Jackson (0–4)		8,773	15–11
27	May 2	@ Devil Rays	4–3 (10)	Reyes (1–0)	Guerrier (0–1)		9,101	15–12
28	May 3	@ Devil Rays	6–4	Shields (3–0)	Ortiz (3–2)	Reyes (10)	8,793	15–13
29	May 4	Red Sox	2–0	Wakefield (3–3)	Silva (2–2)	Papelbon (9)	34,951	15–14
30	May 5	Red Sox	2–1	Santana (4–2)	Tavárez (1–3)	Nathan (8)	40,088	16–14
31	May 6	Red Sox	4–3	Schilling (4–1)	Ponson (2–4)	Papelbon (10)	27,807	16–15
32	May 8	White Sox	7–4 (10)	Rincón (2–0)	Sisco (0–1)		21,979	17–15
33	May 9	White Sox	6–3	Danks (1–4)	Ortiz (3–3)		24,367	17–16
34	May 10	White Sox	3–0	Contreras (3–3)	Silva (2–3)		23,663	17–17
35	May 11	Tigers	7–3	Maroth (3–0)	Santana (4–3)		31,458	17–18
36	May 12	Tigers	8–2	Durbin (3–1)	Ponson (2–5)		32,176	17–19
37	May 13	Tigers	16–4	Bonser (1–1)	Vasquez (0–1)		25,037	18–19
38	May 15	@ Indians	15–7	Byrd (3–1)	Ortiz (3–4)		23,325	18–20
39	May 16	@ Indians	7–1	Sabathia (6–1)	Silva (2–4)		17,678	18–21
40	May 17	@ Indians	2–0	Carmona (5–1)	Santana (4–4)		28,609	18–22
41	May 18	@ Brewers	8–1	Bonser (2–1)	Capuano (5–2)		44,759	19–22
42	May 19	@ Brewers	5–2	Baker (1–0)	Bush (3–4)		44,427	20–22
43	May 20	@ Brewers	6–5	Wise (1–1)	Reyes (0–1)	Cordero (17)	39,119	20–23
44	May 21	@ Rangers	14–4	Padilla (2–6)	Silva (2–5)		24,814	20–24
45	May 22	@ Rangers	7–1	Santana (5–4)	Loe (1–4)		27,013	21–24
46	May 23	@ Rangers	5–3	Bonser (3–1)	Tejeda (4–4)	Nathan (9)	24,370	22–24
47	May 25	Blue Jays	4–3	Guerrier (1–1)	Downs (1–1)	Nathan (10)	26,781	23–24
48	May 26	Blue Jays	9–8 (13)	Tallet (1–1)	Guerrier (1–2)		31,434	23–25
49	May 27	Blue Jays	4–2	Silva (3–5)	Burnett (5–4)	Nathan (11)	25,781	24–25
50	May 28	White Sox	10–4	Santana (6–4)	Contreras (4–5)		27,090	25–25
51	May 29	White Sox	9–2	Bonser (4–1)	Danks (3–5)		23,771	26–25
52	May 30	White Sox	7–6	Nathan (2–1)	MacDougal (1–2)		29,042	27–25

June: 15–12

#	Date	Opponent	Score	Win	Loss	Save	Attendance	Record
53	June 1	@ Athletics	3–2 (10)	Neshek (3–0)	Calero (0–4)	Nathan (12)	20,219	28–25
54	June 2	@ Athletics	1–0	Blanton (5–3)	Silva (3–6)		30,576	28–26
55	June 3	@ Athletics	4–2	Gaudin (6–1)	Santana (6–5)	Embree (4)	25,388	28–27
56	June 4	@ Angels	16–3	Weaver (5–3)	Bonser (4–2)		37,380	28–28
57	June 5	@ Angels	5–1	Escobar (7–3)	Baker (1–1)		42,001	28–29
58	June 6	@ Angels	8–5	Slowey (1–0)	Lackey (9–4)	Nathan (13)	36,453	29–29
59	June 8	Nationals	8–5	Simontacchi (3–4)	Silva (3–7)	Rivera (2)	25,144	29–30
60	June 9	Nationals	3–1	Speigner (2–2)	Santana (6–6)	Cordero (8)	39,742	29–31
61	June 10	Nationals	6–3	Bonser (5–2)	Bacsik (1–3)	Nathan (14)	31,035	30–31
62	June 12	Braves	7–3	Slowey (2–0)	Davies (3–5)		25,868	31–31
63	June 13	Braves	6–0	Silva (4–7)	James (5–6)		27,903	32–31
64	June 14	Braves	3–2	Reyes (1–1)	Wickman (1–2)		26,714	33–31
65	June 15	Brewers	11–3	Vargas (5–1)	Baker (1–2)	Shouse (1)	27,977	33–32
66	June 16	Brewers	5–2	Bush (4–6)	Bonser (5–3)	Cordero (25)	37,117	33–33
67	June 17	Brewers	10–9	Nathan (3–1)	Spurling (1–1)		31,624	34–33
68	June 18	@ Mets	8–1	Maine (7–4)	Silva (4–8)		37,319	34–34
69	June 19	@ Mets	9–0	Santana (7–6)	Sosa (6–3)		40,935	35–34
70	June 20	@ Mets	6–2	Baker (2–2)	Pérez (7–6)		44,517	36–34
71	June 22	@ Marlins	5–4	Benítez (2–3)	Rincón (2–1)	Gregg (14)	15,271	36–35
72	June 23	@ Marlins	11–1	Silva (5–8)	Johnson (0–2)		21,368	37–35
73	June 24	@ Marlins	7–4	Santana (8–6)	Kim (3–4)		15,035	38–35
74	June 25	Blue Jays	8–5	Halladay (9–2)	Guerrier (1–3)	Accardo (9)	24,240	38–36
75	June 26	Blue Jays	2–1 (12)	Rincón (3–1)	Tallet (2–2)		27,000	39–36
76	June 27	Blue Jays	5–4	Towers (3–5)	Bonser (5–4)	Accardo (10)	30,959	39–37
77	June 28	Blue Jays	8–5	Silva (6–8)	Frasor (1–3)	Nathan (15)	31,038	40–37
78	June 29	@ Tigers	11–1	Santana (9–6)	Verlander (9–3)		42,361	41–37
79	June 30	@ Tigers	8–5	Slowey (3–0)	Miller (3–2)	Nathan (16)	41,588	42–37

July: 13–15

#	Date	Opponent	Score	Win	Loss	Save	Attendance	Record
80	July 1	@ Tigers	1–0	Bonderman (9–1)	Baker (2–3)	Jones (20)	41,078	42–38
81	July 2	@ Yankees	5–1	Clemens (2–3)	Bonser (5–5)		53,036	42–39
82	July 3	@ Yankees	8–0	Wang (8–4)	Silva (6–9)		53,862	42–40
83	July 4	@ Yankees	6–2	Santana (10–6)	Mussina (4–6)		52,040	43–40
84	July 5	@ Yankees	7–6	Farnsworth (1–1)	Neshek (3–1)	Rivera (11)	52,471	43–41
85	July 6	@ White Sox	20–14	Baker (3–3)	Garland (6–6)		31,543	44–41
86	July 6	@ White Sox	12–0	Garza (1–0)	Floyd (0–1)		32,426	45–41
87	July 7	@ White Sox	3–1	Buehrle (6–4)	Bonser (5–6)	Jenks (23)	36,791	45–42
88	July 8	@ White Sox	6–3	Vázquez (6–5)	Silva (6–10)		32,724	45–43
89	July 12	Athletics	6–2	Baker (4–3)	Gaudin (8–4)		25,207	46–43
90	July 13	Athletics	5–3	Santana (11–6)	DiNardo (3–6)	Nathan (17)	36,338	47–43
91	July 14	Athletics	4–3	Silva (6–10)	Blanton (8–6)	Nathan (18)	36,066	48–43
92	July 15	Athletics	4–3	Neshek (4–1)	Kennedy (2–8)		36,737	49–43
93	July 17	Tigers	1–0	Robertson (6–6)	Garza (1–1)	Jones (24)	30,939	49–44
94	July 18	Tigers	3–2	Miller (5–3)	Santana (10–7)	Jones (25)	38,070	49–45
95	July 19	Tigers	4–3 (10)	Miner (1–1)	Nathan (3–2)	Jones (26)	36,551	49–46
96	July 20	Angels	7–5	Silva (8–10)	Lackey (12–6)	Nathan (19)	35,794	50–46
97	July 21	Angels	5–2	Neshek (5–1)	Shields (2–3)	Nathan (20)	33,868	51–46
98	July 22	Angels	7–2	Saunders (4–0)	Garza (1–2)		33,217	51–47
99	July 23	@ Blue Jays	6–4	Marcum (6–4)	Santana (11–8)	Accardo (16)	26,091	51–48
100	July 24	@ Blue Jays	7–0	McGowan (7–5)	Baker (4–4)		30,669	51–49
101	July 25	@ Blue Jays	13–1	Litsch (3–4)	Silva (8–11)		37,342	51–50
102	July 27	@ Indians	10–4	Byrd (9–4)	Bonser (5–7)		37–292	51–51
103	July 28	@ Indians	3–2	Neshek (6–1)	Borowski (2–4)	Nathan (21)	41,203	52–51
104	July 29	@ Indians	4–1	Reyes (2–1)	Sabathia (13–6)	Nathan (22)	37,102	53–51
105	July 30	Royals	3–1	Baker (5–4)	Meche (7–8)	Nathan (23)	23,628	54–51
106	July 31	Royals	5–3	Silva (9–11)	de la Rosa (8–11)	Nathan (24)	22,890	55–51

August: 13–16

#	Date	Opponent	Score	Win	Loss	Save	Attendance	Record
107	August 1	Royals	5–3 (10)	Greinke (5–5)	Rincón (3–2)	Soria (11)	24,880	55–52
--	August 2	Royals	Postponed (I-35W bridge collapse) rescheduled for August 31					55–52
108	August 3	Indians	5–4	Sabathia (14–6)	Santana (11–9)	Borowski (30)	31,664	55–53
109	August 4	Indians	3–2	Ortiz (4–4)	Laffey (0–1)	Nathan (25)	33,663	56–53
110	August 5	Indians	1–0	Baker (6–4)	Carmona (13–6)	Nathan (26)	38,334	57–53
111	August 6	Indians	4–0	Byrd (10–4)	Silva (9–12)		28,314	57–54
112	August 7	@ Royals	5–1	Bannister (8–6)	Bonser (5–8)		15,648	57–55
113	August 8	@ Royals	11–4	Santana (12–9)	Pérez (6–11)		21,503	58–55
114	August 9	@ Royals	1–0	Davies (1–0)	Garza (1–3)	Soria (12)	14,569	58–56
115	August 10	@ Angels	10–1	Escobar (12–6)	Baker (6–5)		43,810	58–57
116	August 11	@ Angels	4–3	Lackey (15–6)	Neshek (6–2)	Rodríguez (29)	44,064	58–58
117	August 12	@ Angels	6–2	Jer Weaver (8–5)	Bonser (5–9)		43,911	58–59
118	August 13	@ Mariners	4–3	Putz (2–1)	Guerrier (1–4)		37,902	58–60
119	August 14	@ Mariners	11–3	Garza (2–3)	Ramírez (7–4)		33,729	59–60
120	August 15	@ Mariners	6–1	Neshek (7–2)	Washburn (8–10)		42,921	60–60
121	August 17	Rangers	2–1 (10)	Guerrier (2–4)	Wright (3–5)		30,924	61–60
122	August 18	Rangers	5–0	Loe (6–9)	Bonser (5–10)		41,037	61–61
123	August 19	Rangers	1–0	Santana (13–9)	Millwood (8–10)	Nathan (27)	36,353	62–61
124	August 20	Mariners	9–4	Ramírez (8–4)	Garza (2–4)		31,755	62–62
125	August 21	Mariners	7–2	Washburn (9–10)	Baker (6–6)		42,373	62–63
126	August 22	Mariners	8–4	Silva (10–12)	Batista (13–9)		29,881	63–63
127	August 23	@ Orioles	5–2	Bonser (6–10)	Trachsel (6–8)	Guerrier (1)	19,389	64–63
128	August 24	@ Orioles	7–4	Santana (14–9)	Hoey (1–2)	Nathan (28)	29,742	65–63
129	August 25	@ Orioles	8–1	Garza (3–4)	Liz (0–1)		28,700	66–63
130	August 26	@ Orioles	11–3	Baker (7–6)	Bédard (13–5)		30,876	67–63
131	August 27	@ Indians	8–3	Byrd (13–5)	Silva (10–13)		23,178	67–64
132	August 28	@ Indians	6–5	Westbrook (5–7)	Bonser (6–11)	Borowski (38)	24,784	67–65
133	August 29	@ Indians	4–3	Sabathia (15–7)	Santana (14–10)	Borowski (39)	27,303	67–66
134	August 31	Royals	9–4	Davies (6–11)	Garza (3–5)		15,736	67–67
135	August 31	Royals	5–0	Baker (8–6)	Meche (7–12)		24,986	68–67

September: 11–16

#	Date	Opponent	Score	Win	Loss	Save	Attendance	Record
136	September 1	Royals	6–4	Silva (11–13)	Duckworth (2–4)	Nathan (29)	21,738	69–67
137	September 2	Royals	8–1	Bannister (12–7)	Bonser (6–12)		26,454	69–68
138	September 3	Indians	5–0	Sabathia (16–7)	Santana (14–11)		24,105	69–69
139	September 4	Indians	7–5 (11)	Betancourt (4–0)	DePaula (0–1)	Borowski (40)	16,218	69–70
140	September 5	Indians	6–2	Carmona (15–8)	Baker (8–7)	Pérez (1)	13,977	69–71
141	September 7	@ White Sox	11–10 (13)	Phillips (1–1)	Rincón (3–3)		34,104	69–72
142	September 8	@ White Sox	8–7	Myers (4–0)	Cali (0–1)	Thornton (2)	31,747	69–73
143	September 9	@ White Sox	5–2	Santana (15–11)	Garland (9–11)	Nathan (30)	32,250	70–73
144	September 10	@ Royals	4–2	Bonser (7–12)	Buckner (0–1)	Nathan (31)	10,525	71–73
145	September 11	@ Royals	6–3	Baker (9–7)	Davies (6–13)	Nathan (32)	12,891	72–73
146	September 12	@ Royals	6–3	Meche (8–12)	Silva (11–14)		10,102	72–74
147	September 14	Tigers	4–2	Robertson (8–11)	Garza (3–6)	Jones (35)	22,282	72–75
148	September 15	Tigers	4–3	Zumaya (2–3)	Santana (15–12)	Jones (36)	35,230	72–76
149	September 16	Tigers	6–4	Jurrjens (3–1)	Baker (9–8)	Jones (37)	21,771	72–77
150	September 17	Rangers	5–4	Nathan (4–2)	Benoit (7–4)		14,197	73–77
151	September 18	Rangers	4–2	Silva (12–14)	Millwood (9–13)	Nathan (33)	18,226	74–77
152	September 19	Rangers	4–2	Garza (4–6)	Padilla (6–10)	Nathan (34)	17,842	75–77
153	September 21	White Sox	6–4	Buehrle (10–9)	Santana (15–13)	Jenks (39)	27,928	75–78
154	September 22	White Sox	8–3	J. Vázquez (14–8)	Baker (9–9)		31,737	75–79
155	September 23	White Sox	7–1	Slowey (4–0)	Floyd (1–5)		29,382	76–79
156	September 24	@ Tigers	2–0	Silva (13–14)	Robertson (8–13)	Nathan (35)	32,716	77–79
157	September 25	@ Tigers	8–0	Bazardo (2–1)	Garza (4–7)		31,394	77–80
158	September 26	@ Tigers	9–4 (6)	Byrdak (3–0)	Blackburn (0–1)		35,375	77–81
159	September 27	@ Red Sox	5–4	Bonser (8–12)	Beckett (20–7)	Nathan (36)	36,743	78–81
160	September 28	@ Red Sox	5–2	Matsuzaka (15–12)	Slowey (4–1)	Papelbon (37)	36,843	78–82
161	September 29	@ Red Sox	6–4	Wakefield (17–12)	Blackburn (0–2)	Okajima (5)	36,619	78–83
162	September 30	@ Red Sox	3–2	Garza (5–7)	Tavárez (7–11)	Nathan (37)	36,364	79–83

=== Roster ===
2007 Minnesota Twins
Roster
Pitchers: 30 Scott Baker; 53 Nick Blackburn; 26 Boof Bonser; 56 Carmen Cali; 28 Jesse Crain; 51 Julio DePaula; 21 Matt Garza; 54 Matt Guerrier; 49 Jason Miller; 36 Joe Nathan; 17 Pat Neshek; 44 Ramón Ortiz; 60 Glen Perkins; 19 Sidney Ponson; 37 Dennys Reyes; 39 Juan Rincón; 57 Johan Santana; 52 Carlos Silva; 59 Kevin Slowey	Catchers: 41 Chris Heintz; 23 Matthew LeCroy; 7 Joe Mauer; 58 José Morales; 55 Mike Redmond; Infielders: 18 Jason Bartlett; 32 Brian Buscher; 25 Alexi Casilla; 1 Luis Castillo; 27 Jeff Cirillo; 50 Garrett Jones; 33 Justin Morneau; 8 Nick Punto; 38 Luis Rodríguez; 61 Tommy Watkins	Outfielders: 5 Michael Cuddyer; 20 Lew Ford; 48 Torii Hunter; 16 Jason Kubel; 31 Darnell McDonald; 11 Josh Rabe; 12 Jason Tyner; 24 Rondell White	Manager: 35 Ron Gardenhire; Coaches: 40 Rick Anderson (pitching); 9 Steve Liddle (bench); 43 Rick Stelmaszek (bullpen); 45 Scott Ullger (third base); 46 Joe Vavra (hitting); 13 Jerry White (first base)

== Player stats ==
=== Batting ===
==== Starters by position ====
Note: Pos = Position; G = Games played; AB = At bats; H = Hits; Avg. = Batting average; HR = Home runs; RBI = Runs batted in

Pos	Player	G	AB	H	Avg.	HR	RBI
C	Joe Mauer	109	406	119	.293	7	60
1B	Justin Morneau	157	590	160	.271	31	111
2B	Luis Castillo	85	349	106	.304	0	18
SS	Jason Bartlett	140	510	135	.265	5	43
3B	Nick Punto	150	472	99	.210	1	25
LF	Jason Kubel	128	418	114	.273	13	65
CF	Torii Hunter	160	600	172	.287	28	107
RF	Michael Cuddyer	144	547	151	.276	16	81
DH	Jason Tyner	114	304	87	.286	1	22

==== Other batters ====
Note: G = Games played; AB = At bats; H = Hits; Avg. = Batting average; HR = Home runs; RBI = Runs batted in

Player	G	AB	H	Avg.	HR	RBI
Mike Redmond	82	272	80	.294	1	38
Alexi Casilla	56	189	42	.222	0	9
Luis Rodríguez	68	155	34	.219	2	12
Jeff Cirillo	50	153	40	.261	2	21
Lew Ford	55	116	27	.233	3	14
Rondell White	38	109	19	.174	4	20
Brian Buscher	33	82	20	.244	2	10
Garrett Jones	31	77	16	.208	2	5
Chris Heintz	24	56	14	.250	0	7
Josh Rabe	14	31	6	.194	0	2
Tommy Watkins	9	28	10	.357	0	0
Matt LeCroy	7	20	3	.150	0	0
Darnell McDonald	4	10	1	.100	0	0
José Morales	1	3	3	1.000	0	0

=== Pitching ===
==== Starting pitchers ====
Note: G = Games pitched; IP = Innings pitched; W = Wins; L = Losses; ERA = Earned run average; SO = Strikeouts

Player	G	IP	W	L	ERA	SO
Johan Santana	33	219.0	15	13	3.33	235
Carlos Silva	33	202.0	13	14	4.19	89
Boof Bonser	31	173.0	8	12	5.10	136
Scott Baker	24	143.2	9	9	4.26	102
Matt Garza	16	83.0	5	7	3.69	67
Kevin Slowey	13	66.2	4	1	4.73	47
Sidney Ponson	7	37.2	2	5	6.93	23

==== Other pitchers ====
Note: G = Games pitched; IP = Innings pitched; W = Wins; L = Losses; ERA = Earned run average; SO = Strikeouts

Player	G	IP	W	L	ERA	SO
Ramón Ortiz	28	91.0	4	4	5.14	44

==== Relief pitchers ====
Note: G = Games pitched; W = Wins; L = Losses; SV = Saves; ERA = Earned run average; SO = Strikeouts

Player	G	W	L	SV	ERA	SO
Joe Nathan	68	4	2	37	1.88	77
Pat Neshek	74	7	2	0	2.94	74
Matt Guerrier	73	2	4	1	2.35	68
Juan Rincón	63	3	3	0	5.13	49
Dennys Reyes	50	2	1	0	3.99	21
Carmen Cali	24	0	1	0	4.71	14
Glen Perkins	19	0	0	0	3.14	20
Jesse Crain	18	1	2	0	5.51	10
Julio DePaula	16	0	1	0	8.55	8
Nick Blackburn	6	0	2	0	7.71	8
Jason Miller	4	0	0	0	18.00	2

== Other post-season awards ==
- Calvin R. Griffith Award (Most Valuable Twin) – Torii Hunter
- Joseph W. Haynes Award (Twins Pitcher of the Year) – Johan Santana
- Bill Boni Award (Twins Outstanding Rookie) – Matt Garza
- Charles O. Johnson Award (Most Improved Twin) – Carlos Silva
- Dick Siebert Award (Upper Midwest Player of the Year) – Pat Neshek
- Bob Allison Award (Leadership Award) – Mike Redmond
- Mike Augustin Award ("Media Good Guy" Award) – Torii Hunter
  - The above awards are voted on by the Twin Cities chapter of the BBWAA
- Carl R. Pohlad Award (Outstanding Community Service) – Johan Santana
- Sherry Robertson Award (Twins Outstanding Farm System Position Player) – Brian Buscher
- Jim Rantz Award (Twins Outstanding Farm System Pitcher) – Kevin Slowey
- Kirby Puckett Award (Alumni Community Service) – Tony Oliva
- Herb Carneal Award (Lifetime Achievement Award) – Tom Mee

== Farm system ==
Level	Team	League	Manager
AAA	Rochester Red Wings	International League	Stan Cliburn
AA	New Britain Rock Cats	Eastern League	Riccardo Ingram
A	Fort Myers Miracle	Florida State League	Kevin Boles
A	Beloit Snappers	Midwest League	Jeff Smith
Rookie	Elizabethton Twins	Appalachian League	Ray Smith
Rookie	GCL Twins	Gulf Coast League	Nelson Prada

LEAGUE CHAMPIONS: Elizabethton
