= Carlos Silva (baseball) =

Venezuelan baseball player (born 1979)

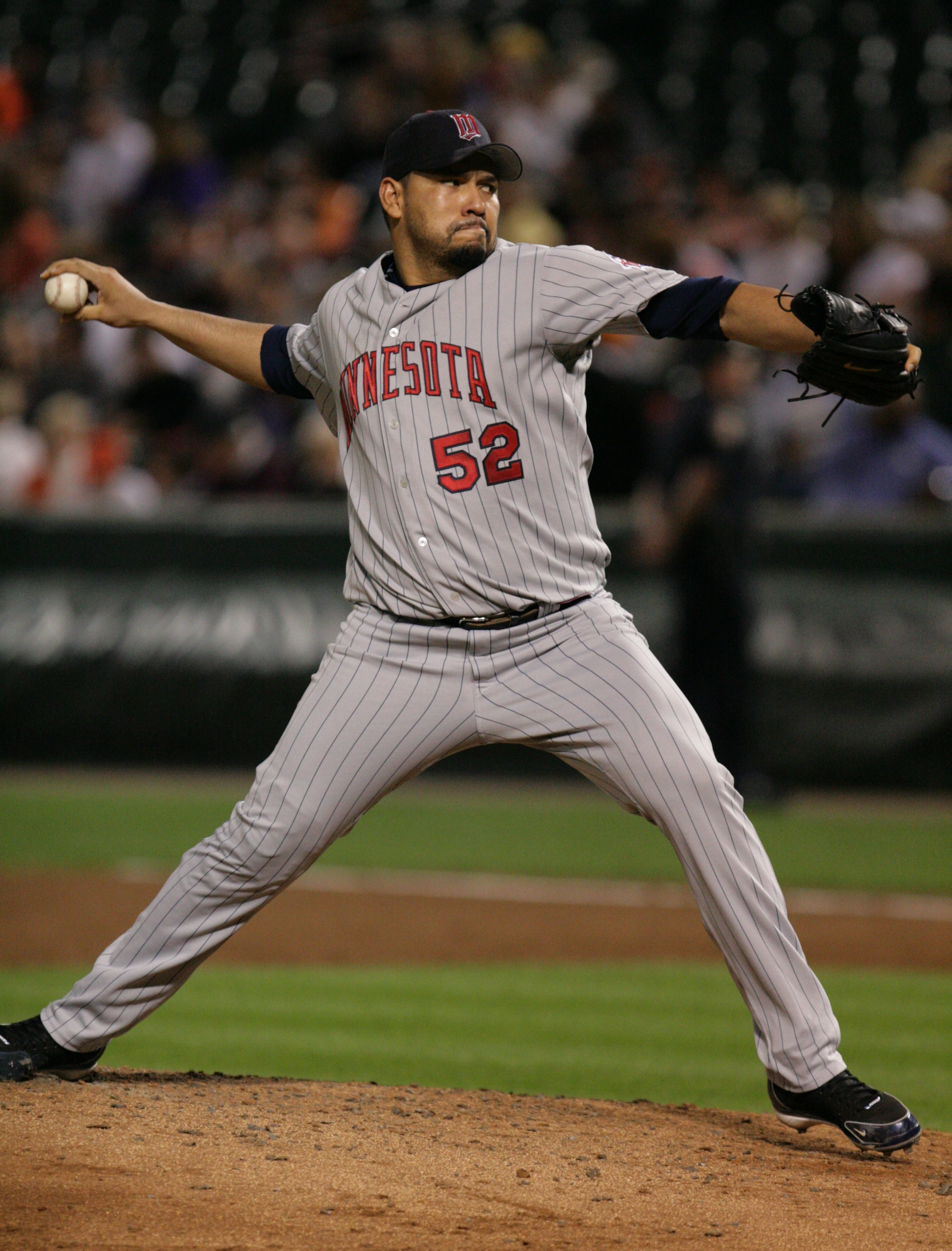
- Silva with the Minnesota Twins
- Pitcher
- Born: April 23, 1979 (age 47); Bolívar, Venezuela
- Batted: Right Threw: Right

MLB debut
- April 1, 2002, for the Philadelphia Phillies

Last MLB appearance
- September 7, 2010, for the Chicago Cubs

MLB statistics
- Win–loss record: 70–70
- Earned run average: 4.68
- Strikeouts: 554
- Stats at Baseball Reference

Teams
- Philadelphia Phillies (2002–2003); Minnesota Twins (2004–2007); Seattle Mariners (2008–2009); Chicago Cubs (2010)

Carlos Silva (born April 23, 1979) is a Venezuelan former professional baseball pitcher, who played in Major League Baseball (MLB) for the Philadelphia Phillies (2002–2003), Minnesota Twins (2004–2007), Seattle Mariners (2008–2009), and Chicago Cubs (2010).

== Professional career ==
=== Philadelphia Phillies ===
Silva signed with the Philadelphia Phillies as an amateur free agent in 1996. He made his major league debut in 2002, pitching the entire season out of the bullpen. Silva appeared in 68 games for the Phillies, going 5–0 with a 3.21 ERA and 41 strikeouts. In 2003, he went 3–1 despite an ERA of 4.43 in 62 games and 1 start.

=== Minnesota Twins ===
In December 2003, the Twins acquired Silva from Philadelphia along with Nick Punto and Bobby Korecky for starting pitcher Eric Milton.

With the Twins, Silva made a successful conversion from reliever to starter, in one of the biggest surprises in the 2004 season. He posted a 14–8 mark in 203 innings pitched and finished second in the rotation behind Cy Young winner Johan Santana. In 2005, he set the record for fewest walks allowed per 9 innings in the modern era with an average of 0.43 walks per 9 innings pitched. On May 20, Silva set a record since 1957 for the fewest pitches thrown (74) in a nine-inning complete game. In 2005, he also induced more double plays (34) than any other pitcher in the majors.

In May 2006, Silva was demoted to the bullpen after struggling through the beginning of the season. In June, he re-entered the rotation when struggling starter Scott Baker was demoted to Triple-A Rochester. Silva gave up a major-league-worst 1.90 home runs per 9 innings, giving up 38 (the most in MLB) and had a major-league-worst batting average against of .326. However, he issued only 32 walks. In the previous season, he gave up 25 homers and just 9 walks. Through the 2010 season, Silva had two of the only 15 seasons in which a pitcher qualified for the ERA title and allowed more home runs than walks.

Through 2006, Silva posted a 42–32 record with 306 strikeouts and a 4.35 ERA in 743 innings. In 2007, Silva started as the fifth starter behind Johan Santana, Boof Bonser, Ramón Ortiz, and Sidney Ponson. In his final season with the Twins, Silva finished 13-14 in 33 starts with a career-high 89 strikeouts.

Silva allowed Frank Thomas's 500th career home run on June 28, 2007, at the Metrodome.

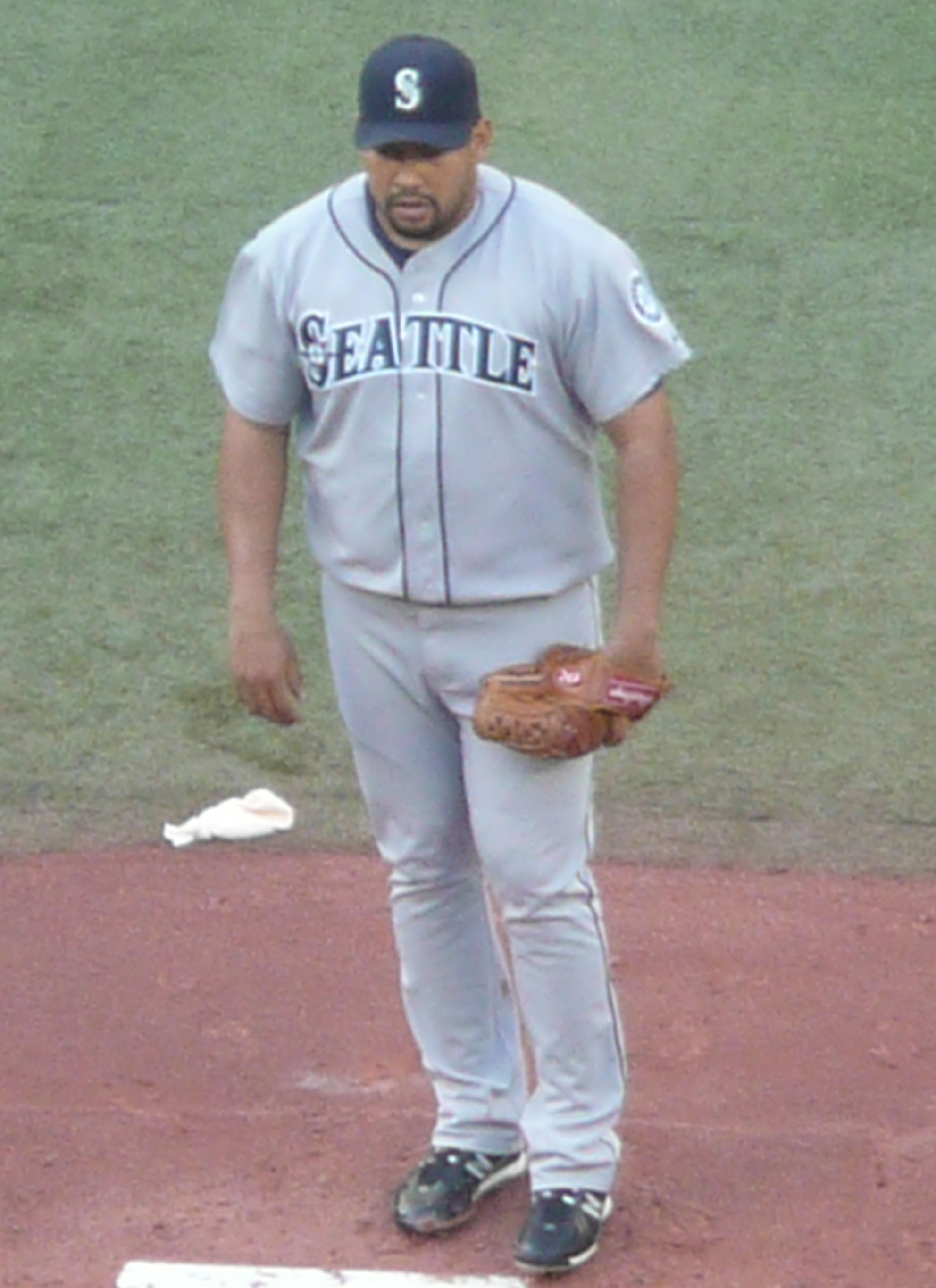
Silva with the Mariners in 2008.

=== Seattle Mariners ===
On December 20, 2007, Silva signed a four-year, $48 million contract with the Seattle Mariners.

In his first season as a Mariner, Silva posted the worst ERA for a full-time starter in 2008 with a 6.46 ERA in 28 starts. He also spent time on the DL with a sore elbow. He finished 4–15 as he managed to win just one game after the month of April. While playing poorly, Silva also publicly criticized some teammates for "being interested only in padding their stats."

Fresh off the WBC, Silva started the 2009 season slower than expected, with poor control and a high ERA. He sat out most of the season with a shoulder injury. Silva returned at near the end of the season for 2 appearances in relief, giving up one run in 2/3 innings to the Yankees on September 19 and one run in one inning on September 25 in Toronto.

=== Chicago Cubs ===
On December 18, 2009, Silva was traded along with $9 million to the Chicago Cubs for outfielder Milton Bradley. Silva appeared to turn around his career around early in 2010, becoming the first Cubs starter since 1967 to begin a season with an 8–0 record. Despite fighting a stomach virus on June 7, he held the Pittsburgh Pirates to one run over seven innings, picking up his eighth win of the year in a 6–1 triumph. It was the best start by any Cub pitcher since Ken Holtzman began the 1967 season with nine straight wins, a feat matched by Jake Arrieta in 2016. However, Silva's success was very limited for the remainder of the season, and he was cut from the Cubs towards the end of spring training in 2011.

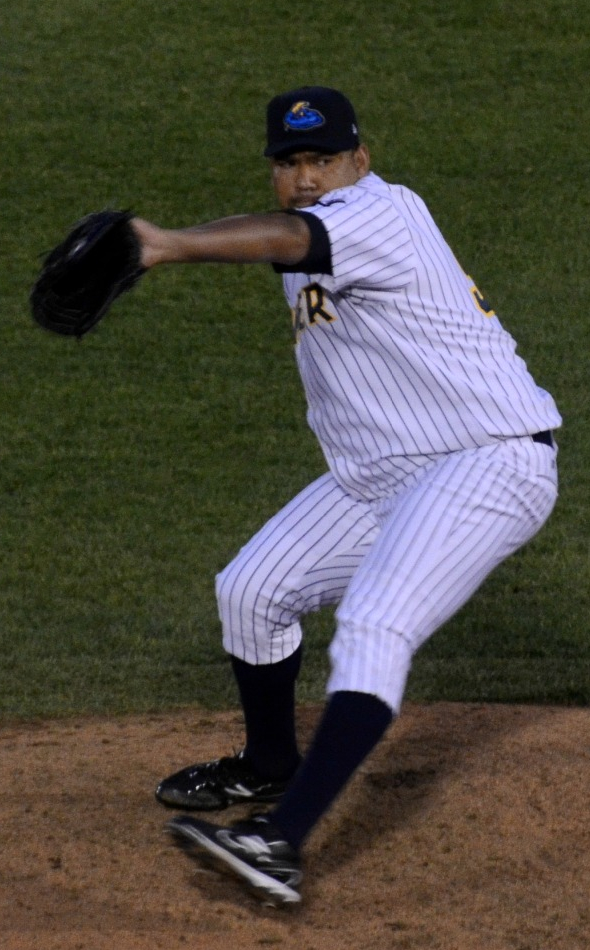
Silva pitching for the Trenton Thunder in 2011.

=== New York Yankees ===
On April 9, 2011, the New York Yankees signed Silva to a minor league deal. He was released on July 2 after pitching in seven minor league games and dealing with a shoulder injury.

=== Boston Red Sox ===
On January 3, 2012, Silva signed a minor league deal with the Boston Red Sox. He was released on March 17.

== International career ==
Silva pitched for Venezuela in the 2006 World Baseball Classic (WBC) and 2009 WBC. In 2006, he allows no runs in 5 2/3 innings in two games. In 2009, he was 1–1, starting a blowout semifinal loss to South Korea, with a 5.11 ERA in a team-high 12 1/3 innings in 3 games.

== Pitching style ==
Silva threw a low 90s sinking fastball, a slider, a changeup, and a splitter. He was known for his relatively quick pace, taking very short breaks between pitches.

== Personal life ==
Silva is married and has two children.

== See also ==
- List of Major League Baseball players from Venezuela
