= 2002 Eastern League season =

The 2002 Eastern League season began on approximately April 1 and the regular season ended on approximately September 1.

The Norwich Navigators defeated the Harrisburg Senators 3 games to 2 to win the Eastern League Championship Series.

== Regular season ==
=== Standings ===
Eastern League - Northern Division
Team	Win	Loss	%	GB
**Norwich Navigators**	76	64	.543	–
New Haven Ravens	74	65	.532	1.5
Binghamton Mets	73	68	.518	3.5
New Britain Rock Cats	67	72	.482	8.5
Portland Sea Dogs	63	77	.450	13.0
Trenton Thunder	63	77	.450	13.0

Eastern League - Southern Division
Team	Win	Loss	%	GB
Akron Aeros	93	48	.660	–
**Harrisburg Senators**	79	63	.556	14.5
Reading Phillies	76	66	.535	17.5
Altoona Curve	72	69	.511	21.0
Bowie Baysox	55	85	.393	37.5
Erie SeaWolves	52	89	.369	41.0

Notes:

Green shade indicates that team advanced to the playoffs
Bold indicates that team advanced to ELCS
Italics indicates that team won ELCS

=== Statistical league leaders ===
==== Batting leaders ====
Stat	Player	Total
AVG	Víctor Martínez (Akron Aeros)	.336
HR	Val Pascucci (Harrisburg Senators)	27
RBI	Dee Haynes (New Haven Ravens)	98
R	Víctor Martínez (Akron Aeros)	84

==== Pitching leaders ====
Stat	Player	Total
W	Ryan Madson (Reading Phillies)	16
ERA	Danny Borrell (Norwich Navigators)	2.31
SO	Julio DePaula (Norwich Navigators)	152
SV	Juan Padilla (New Britain Rock Cats)	29

== Playoffs ==
=== Divisional Series ===
==== Northern Division ====
The Norwich Navigators defeated the New Haven Ravens in the Northern Division playoffs 3 games to 0.

==== Southern Division ====
The Harrisburg Senators defeated the Akron Aeros in the Southern Division playoffs 3 games to 2.

=== Championship Series ===
The Norwich Navigators defeated the Harrisburg Senators in the ELCS 3 games to 2.
