= Kevin Slowey =

American baseball player (born 1984)

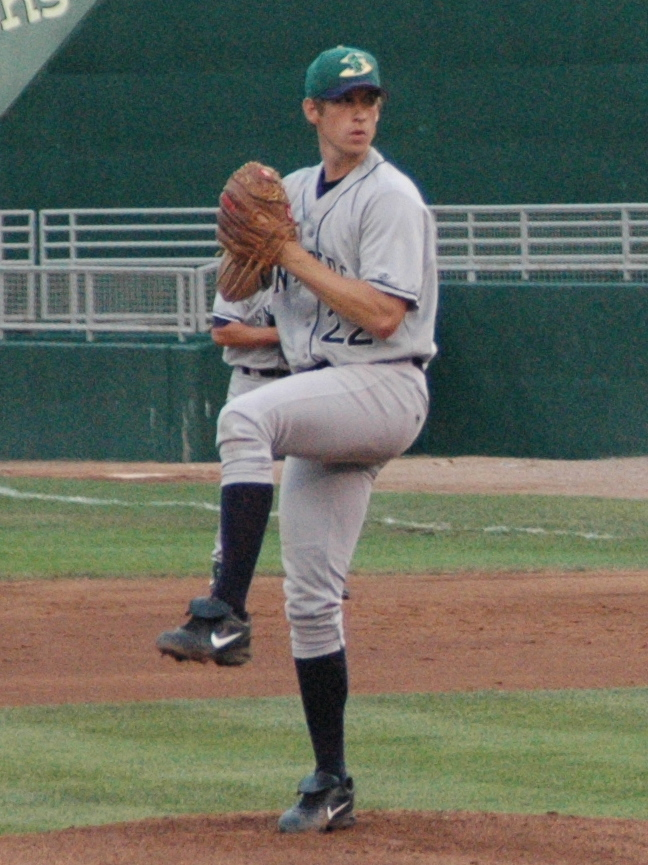
- Slowey with the Beloit Snappers in 2005
- Pitcher
- Born: May 4, 1984 (age 42); Conroe, Texas, U.S.
- Batted: Right Threw: Right

MLB debut
- June 1, 2007, for the Minnesota Twins

Last MLB appearance
- June 14, 2014, for the Miami Marlins

MLB statistics
- Win–loss record: 43–36
- Earned run average: 4.62
- Strikeouts: 495
- Stats at Baseball Reference

Teams
- Minnesota Twins (2007–2011); Miami Marlins (2013–2014)

Kevin Michael Slowey (born May 4, 1984) is an American former professional baseball pitcher. Slowey was selected by the Minnesota Twins in the second round (73rd overall) of the 2005 Major League Baseball draft. He also played for the Miami Marlins. After his playing career ended, Slowey joined the Major League Baseball Players Association as an assistant.

== College ==
Slowey drew little attention from NCAA Division I schools and ended up attending Winthrop University on an academic scholarship after scoring a 1420 on his SAT. He went on to be named as a third-team All-American by Baseball America in 2005 when he had 14–2 record with 126 strikeouts, only 13 walks issued, and a 2.16 ERA. In his three seasons at Winthrop, he set school records with 331 strikeouts and 29 wins.

== Playing career ==
=== Minnesota Twins ===
==== 2007 season ====
Slowey ascended rapidly through the Twins minor league system and after failing to make the team as a dark horse candidate out of spring training, he began the 2007 season with the Triple-A Rochester Red Wings. In nine starts, Slowey was 6–2 with a 1.54 ERA, 57 strikeouts, and five walks for the Red Wings. Due to his strong start, he was called up to the Twins and made his major league debut on June 1, 2007, as a replacement for struggling Ramón Ortiz in the starting rotation.

In his first major league start against the Oakland Athletics, Slowey received a no decision in a Twins 3–2 win. He gave up one run, five hits, struck out three, and walked two in six complete innings. The lone run came off of a solo home run in the sixth inning by the A's Eric Chavez. A highlight of the start occurred early in the game when in the first inning, Slowey showed excellent poise in working out of a bases loaded jam.

In his second start on June 6, 2007, Slowey earned the first win of his MLB career against the Los Angeles Angels of Anaheim. He pitched five innings, giving up five runs, (four earned), striking out two, and walking none as the Twins won 8–5.

After an excellent start against the Atlanta Braves on June 12, 2007, in which he gave up two earned runs in six innings, Slowey began to struggle through his remaining starts. On July 5, 2007, after giving up five earned runs in 3 2/3 innings against the New York Yankees, Slowey was optioned back to the Triple-A Rochester Red Wings, exchanging his roster spot with Carmen Cali.

==== 2008 season ====
Slowey pitched 23 2/3 innings for the Minnesota Twins in spring training, posting a 3–2 record and 4.94 ERA, earning him a spot on the starting rotation.

On April 11, 2008, Slowey was placed on the 15-day disabled list with a strained right biceps. On May 8, 2008, he was activated from the DL.

On May 29, 2008, Slowey pitched his first MLB complete game. In that game against the Kansas City Royals, he was one out away from a shutout as well; however, he up gave an RBI double to Alex Gordon. In his 101st pitch of the night, he retired the next batter and finished the night with a victory after nine innings of work.

On June 29, 2008, Slowey pitched his first big league complete shutout game against the Milwaukee Brewers. He finished the season 12–11 with a 3.99 ERA, 24 walks, and 123 strikeouts in 27 starts. He achieved an 0–2 count on 32.7% of all batters he faced, the second-highest percentage in the majors.

==== 2009 season ====
In 16 starts, Slowey posted a very impressive 10–3 record, but recorded a 4.86 ERA and a WHIP of 1.412. Slowey's season was cut short when he was placed on the disabled list for a strained right wrist on July 4. Tests revealed that a pre-existing bone fragment was responsible for the aggravation. Slowey had season-ending surgery on his wrist in late July.

==== 2010 season ====
Despite having wrist surgery, Slowey was able to start the season in the Twins rotation, winning in his first start of the year against the Los Angeles Angels. On July 1, 2010, he left a game against the Detroit Tigers after he was hit in the ankle by a batted ball, but did not miss any time on the mound.

On August 9, 2010, Slowey missed a start against the Chicago White Sox due to elbow soreness. On August 15, 2010, he pitched seven no-hit innings against the Oakland Athletics before being removed in the top of the eighth for Jon Rauch. Rauch retired the first batter he faced before giving up a double to Cliff Pennington. Addressing the questionable move, manager Ron Gardenhire said, "It's the way it is. It's sad. I'd be booing too because I want to see a no-hitter, but I also know I'm responsible for this guy's arm", as he alluded to the elbow tendinitis that caused Slowey to miss his last start. Slowey had thrown 106 pitches through his seven innings. He ended the season going 13–6 with a 4.45 ERA in a career-high 30 games (28 starts).

==== 2011 season ====
In Spring Training 2011, Slowey was given a chance to win a spot in the Twins starting rotation, but he was unsuccessful. He began the 2011 season in the bullpen.

Slowey had a rough season in 2011, losing all eight starts he pitched in and going 0–8 with a 6.67 ERA in 14 games (eight starts). This season marked Slowey's last with the team.

=== Colorado Rockies ===
On December 6, 2011, Slowey was traded to the Colorado Rockies in exchange for a player to be named later. He agreed to a one-year, $2.75 million deal to avoid arbitration on December 12.

=== Cleveland Indians ===
On January 20, 2012, Slowey was traded to the Cleveland Indians in exchange for Zach Putnam. He was optioned to the Triple-A Columbus Clippers and subsequently spent the entire season on the minor-league disabled list. Slowey was outrighted to Columbus and removed from the Indians' 40-man roster on October 31, 2012. He subsequently elected to become a free agent on November 7.

=== Miami Marlins ===
On January 15, 2013, Slowey signed a minor league deal with the Miami Marlins as a non-roster invitee with an invitation to spring training. Slowey had a strong spring training, pitching to a 2.41 ERA and a WHIP of 1.13 in six games (two starts). Due to his strong performance, Slowey made the team and was named their #3 starter to start the season.

==== 2013 season ====
Slowey started the 2013 season with several quality starts, and was the Marlins' best statistical starting pitcher in April. Unfortunately, he lacked the run support to earn a victory until May 5, 2013, against the Philadelphia Phillies. It was Slowey's first win at the major league level since September 2010, snapping a 15-start winless streak. On June 8, Slowey got the win in a 20 inning game against the Mets, pitching seven scoreless innings. After his start against Milwaukee on June 12, he was demoted to the bullpen and was replaced in the rotation by Nathan Eovaldi. After Tom Koehler was optioned and Ricky Nolasco was traded, Slowey got the start on July 8 against the Braves, pitching five scoreless innings. After the break, Koehler was recalled and Slowey returned to the bullpen. On July 28, Slowey was placed on the disabled list and missed the rest of the season due to a right flexor strain. In 20 games for the Marlins (14 starts), he went 3–6 with a 4.11 ERA, striking out 76 in 92 innings.

==== 2014 season ====
On December 27, 2013, Slowey re-signed with the Marlins on a minor league contract. He had his contract selected to the major league roster on March 30, 2014. He was designated for assignment on June 16. At the time, he was 1–1 with a 5.30 ERA and 24 strikeouts in 17 games (two starts). On June 24, the Marlins officially released Slowey.

On December 22, 2014, Slowey signed a minor league contract with the Philadelphia Phillies that included an invitation to spring training. He competed with several other pitchers for a spot in the back of the Phillies' starting rotation. He was released on March 31, 2015.

On June 2, 2015, Slowey announced his retirement from professional baseball. He has taken a position in the Major League Baseball Player's Association as a special assistant to Tony Clark, the executive director.

== Pitches ==
Slowey was considered to be a control pitcher and his repertoire included a low 90s fastball considered to be his best pitch, a good changeup, a good slow curveball, and a tight slider. He was known for his exceptional control and command of the strike zone and was often compared to former Minnesota Twins pitcher Brad Radke, due to his excellent control. Slowey's delivery was much simpler than Radke's, however, mainly due to the absence of Radke's high leg kick.

== Family ==
Slowey's cousin, Rob Madore, is a professional ice hockey goaltender who has played in the American Hockey League. He last played with the South Carolina Stingrays of the ECHL.
