= Kris Atteberry =

American baseball broadcaster

Kris Atteberry is an American sports television and radio broadcaster. Starting with the 2024 season, Atteberry will be the head radio play-by-play announcer for the Minnesota Twins.

== Early life and education ==
Atteberry grew up in Bozeman, Montana. He graduated from Stanford University with a degree in English literature. While in college, Atteberry was awarded the National Association of Athletic Directors post-graduate scholarship for his broadcast work for Stanford Cardinal athletics.

== Career ==
Atteberry began his career as lead broadcaster for three seasons for the Sioux Falls Canaries. From 2002 to 2006, Atteberry called games on television and radio for the St. Paul Saints. He additionally has served as a broadcaster for Cal State Fullerton, Pepperdine University, and Montana State University athletics. Atteberry has also called men's and women's college basketball on CBS Sports Network.

In 2007, Atteberry joined John Gordon and Dan Gladden as the pre- and post-game host and backup play-by-play broadcaster for the Minnesota Twins Radio Network.

For the 2024 season, Atteberry will be the head radio play-by-play announcer for the Minnesota Twins.

== Personal life ==
Atteberry resides in Southwest Minneapolis with his wife Jennifer and their daughter.
