= Ramón Ortiz =

Dominican baseball player (born 1973)

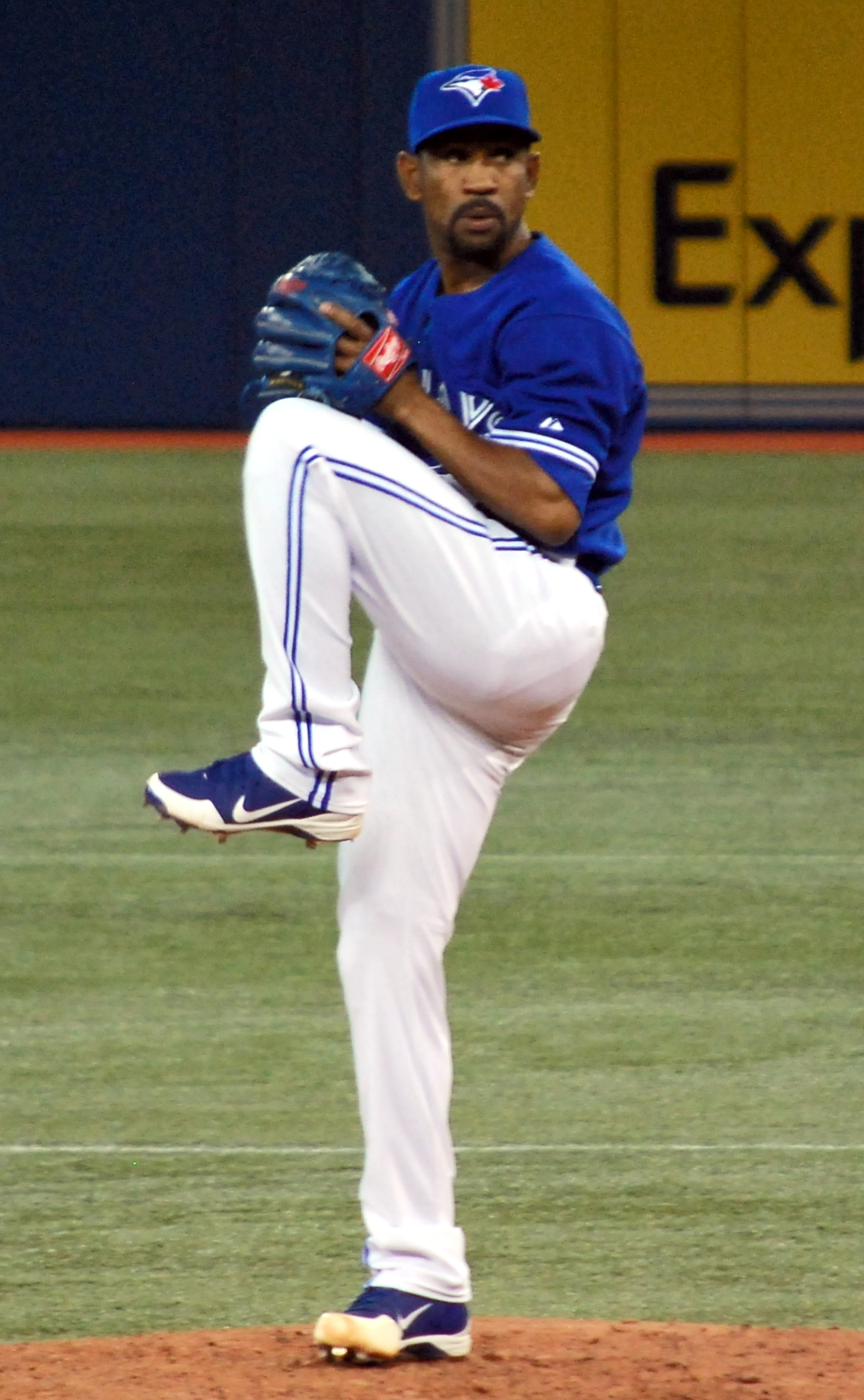
- Ortiz with the Toronto Blue Jays
- Pitcher
- Born: May 23, 1973 (age 53); Cotuí, Dominican Republic
- Batted: Right Threw: Right

Professional debut
- MLB: August 19, 1999, for the Anaheim Angels
- NPB: May 2, 2008, for the Orix Buffaloes

Last appearance
- MLB: June 2, 2013, for the Toronto Blue Jays
- NPB: September 26, 2008, for the Orix Buffaloes

MLB statistics
- Win–loss record: 87–86
- Earned run average: 4.95
- Strikeouts: 895

NPB statistics
- Win–loss record: 4–7
- Earned run average: 5.82
- Strikeouts: 32
- Stats at Baseball Reference

Teams
- Anaheim Angels (1999–2004); Cincinnati Reds (2005); Washington Nationals (2006); Minnesota Twins (2007); Colorado Rockies (2007); Orix Buffaloes (2008); Los Angeles Dodgers (2010); Chicago Cubs (2011); Toronto Blue Jays (2013)

Career highlights and awards
- World Series champion (2002)

Ramón Diógenes Ortiz (born May 23, 1973) is a Dominican former professional baseball pitcher. He played in Major League Baseball (MLB) for the Anaheim Angels, Cincinnati Reds, Washington Nationals, Minnesota Twins, Colorado Rockies, Los Angeles Dodgers, Tampa Bay Rays, Chicago Cubs, and Toronto Blue Jays. Ortiz also played for the Orix Buffaloes of Nippon Professional Baseball (NPB).

== Professional career ==
=== 1999–2005 ===
Ortiz was signed as an undrafted free agent by the Anaheim Angels in 1995. He made his Major League debut on August 19, 1999, starting for the Angels against the Chicago White Sox. He pitched eight innings, allowing four hits and one run to pick up the victory. His best season was 2002, when he went 15–9 with a 3.77 earned run average (ERA) for the Angels. He earned the win in Game 3 of the 2002 World Series against the San Francisco Giants. In 2003, he set a career high with 16 victories.

Ortiz earned an estimated $20.5 million, signing six contracts throughout his career, each for less than $6.1 million.

On December 14, 2004, the Angels traded Ortiz to the Cincinnati Reds for Dustin Moseley. He went 9–11 with a 5.36 ERA in 30 starts for the Reds.

=== 2006–2009 ===
Ortiz signed with the Washington Nationals as a free agent before the 2006 season. On September 4, 2006, he took a no-hitter into the 9th inning against the Cardinals before having it broken up by the first batter in the 9th, Aaron Miles. Ortiz also hit his first career home run in that game, a solo shot off of St. Louis reliever Jorge Sosa. Ortiz was three outs away from becoming the fifth no-hit pitcher in Major League Baseball who had homered in the same game, joining Wes Ferrell (1931), Jim Tobin (1944), Earl Wilson (1962) and Rick Wise (1971).

On January 19, 2007, Ortiz signed with the Minnesota Twins for a one-year deal worth $3.1 million. He began the season as the third starter, behind Johan Santana and Boof Bonser and ahead of Sidney Ponson and Carlos Silva. After a disappointing start to the season, Ortiz was moved to the bullpen.

On August 15, 2007, Ortiz was traded to the Colorado Rockies in return for minor leaguer Matt Macri. He appeared in relief in 10 games for the Rockies and then became a free agent.

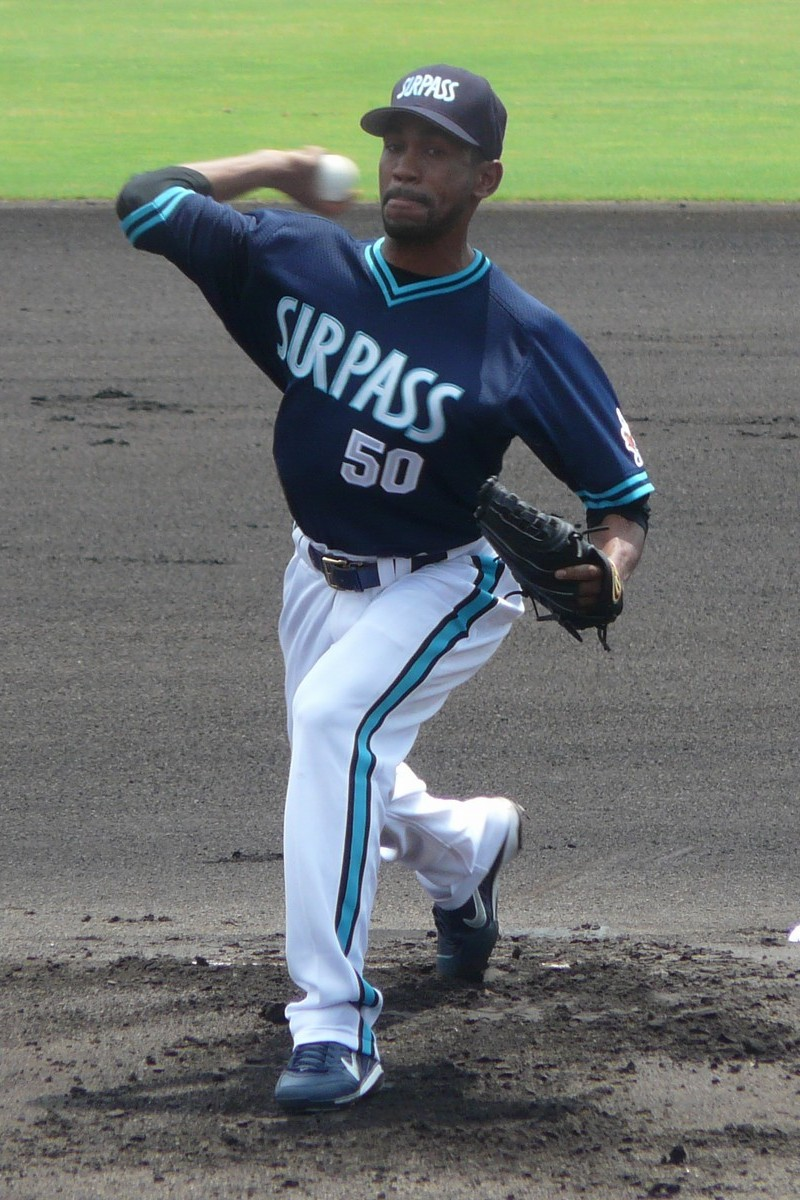
Ortiz pitching for the Orix Buffaloes' farm team in 2008

On April 1, 2008, Ortiz was signed by the Orix Buffaloes of Japan's Nippon Professional Baseball. He started 17 games for Orix and was 4–7 with a 5.82 ERA.

On February 10, 2009, Ortiz signed a minor-league contract with an invitation to spring training with the San Francisco Giants. He spent the season with the Triple-A Fresno Grizzlies, going 5–4 with a 3.05 ERA in 35 games (16 starts).

=== 2010–2015 ===
Ortiz signed a minor-league contract with the Los Angeles Dodgers before the 2010 season, with an invitation to spring training. After good performances in spring training games, he was added to the Dodgers Major League roster to start the season. He picked up his first win since 2007 with a relief performance on May 1. On May 15, Ortiz started for the Dodgers against the San Diego Padres, his first major league start since 2007. He was designated for assignment on May 27, 2010, and on June 3, 2010, he was released. Ortiz signed a minor league contract with the New York Mets on June 22, 2010. He pitched well for the Mets' Triple A affiliate, posting a 3.94 ERA with 6.0 K/9 and 1.5 BB/9 in Buffalo but was later released. The Tampa Bay Rays then signed Ortiz and assigned him to Triple A Durham Bulls. He made 4 starts for Durham, and was 0–1 with a 6.35 ERA before being released.

On April 10, 2011, the Chicago Cubs signed Ortiz to a minor league deal. He had his contract purchased by the Cubs on July 5, and appeared in 22 games for the Cubs going 1–2 with a 4.86 ERA. He was granted free agency on October 30, 2011.

Ortiz signed a minor league contract with the San Francisco Giants on February 15, 2012. He also received an invitation to spring training, but was released on March 26. Ortiz spent the 2012 season playing for the New York Yankees Triple-A affiliate Scranton/Wilkes-Barre Yankees.

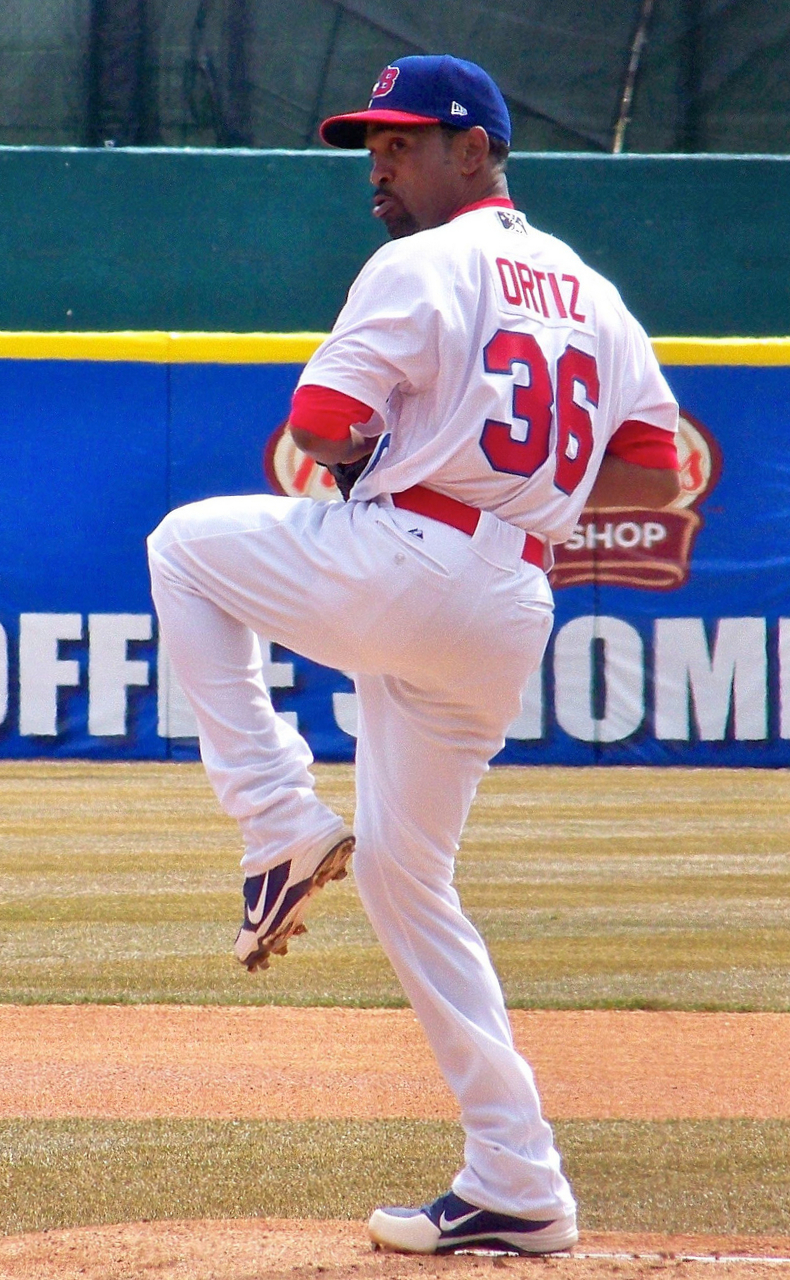
Ortiz pitching for the Buffalo Bisons in 2013

On December 18, 2012, The Toronto Blue Jays announced that Ortiz had been signed to a minor league contract with an invitation to major league spring training. On April 15, the Blue Jays selected his contract from the Buffalo Bisons. Ortiz was designated for assignment on April 23 to make room for Aaron Laffey on the roster. Ortiz cleared waivers, and returned to the Buffalo Bisons on April 25. Ortiz was brought up to the Blue Jays on May 9. He got his first win since 2011 in his start on May 15, 2013, against the Giants. The start was also Ortiz's first start of 7 innings or more since 2007. Ortiz was designated for assignment by the Blue Jays on May 28. He cleared waivers and was assigned back to the Buffalo Bisons on May 31.

Ortiz had his contract purchased again by the Blue Jays on June 1 when Brandon Morrow was placed on the disabled list. Ricky Romero was outrighted from the 40-man roster to open space for Ortiz. He made his third start of the season for the Blue Jays on June 2, against the San Diego Padres. After pitching to a 2–1 count against Chase Headley, Ortiz suffered an apparent elbow injury and became visibly emotional, leaving the field in tears. He was replaced in the game by Brad Lincoln and the Blue Jays won the game 7–4 in 11 innings. Concerns were raised about the severity of Ortiz's injury and whether it would end his career. Ortiz was placed on the 15-day disabled list with a right elbow strain on June 4, while the team awaited the results of an MRI. Ortiz's MRI revealed no tears in his ulnar collateral ligament. Ortiz was transferred to the 60-day disabled list on June 25. His season ended on the disabled list with a 1–2 record, 6.04 earned run average, and 8 strikeouts over 25 1/3 innings.

Ortiz signed with the Toros de Tijuana for the 2014 season. On June 2, 2015, Ortiz signed with the Tigres de Quintana Roo. He was released by the Tigres on December 18, 2015.
