= Jason Miller (baseball) =

American baseball player (born 1982)

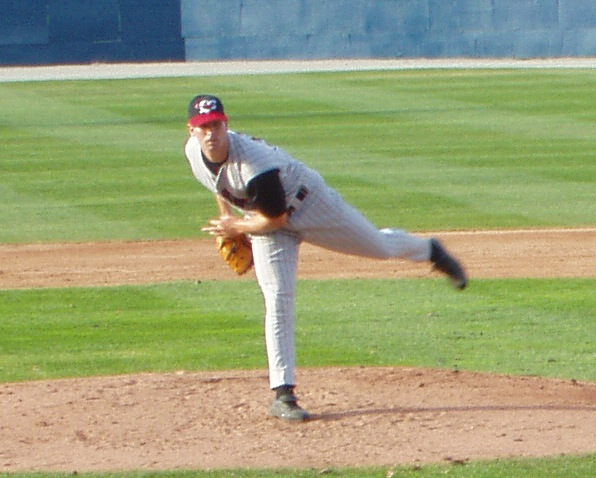
- Miller with the Quad City River Bandits in 2003
- Pitcher
- Born: July 20, 1982 (age 44); Sarasota, Florida, U.S.
- Batted: Left Threw: Left

MLB debut
- May 26, 2007, for the Minnesota Twins

Last MLB appearance
- June 4, 2007, for the Minnesota Twins

MLB statistics
- Win–loss record: 0–0
- Earned run average: 18.00
- Strikeouts: 2
- Stats at Baseball Reference

Teams
- Minnesota Twins (2007)

Jason Douglas Miller (born July 20, 1982) is an American former left-handed Major League Baseball (MLB) pitcher. He played nine seasons in the Minnesota Twins organization until becoming a free agent at the end of the 2008 season. He made his major league debut with the Twins in 2007.

In January 2009, he signed a minor league contract with the Detroit Tigers, but was released in April.
