= Boof Bonser =

American baseball player (born 1981)

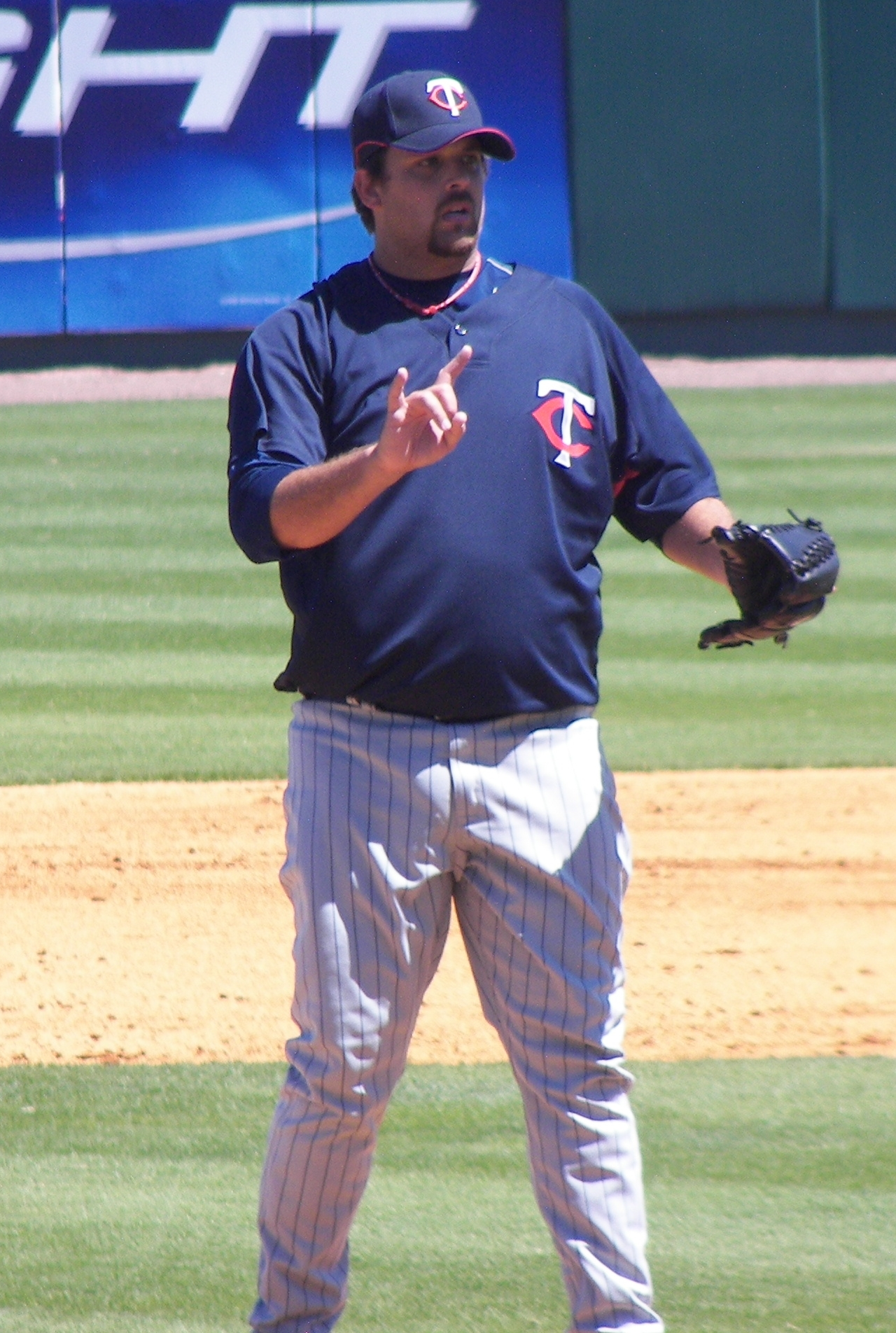
- Bonser with the Minnesota Twins in 2007
- Pitcher
- Born: October 14, 1981 (age 44); St. Petersburg, Florida, U.S.
- Batted: Right Threw: Right

Professional debut
- MLB: May 21, 2006, for the Minnesota Twins
- CPBL: September 4, 2013, for the Uni-President 7-Eleven Lions

Last appearance
- MLB: October 4, 2010, for the Oakland Athletics
- CPBL: August 9, 2014, for the Uni-President 7-Eleven Lions

MLB statistics
- Win–loss record: 19–25
- Earned run average: 5.18
- Strikeouts: 334

CPBL statistics
- Win–loss record: 4–3
- Earned run average: 2.82
- Strikeouts: 36
- Stats at Baseball Reference

Teams
- Minnesota Twins (2006–2008); Boston Red Sox (2010); Oakland Athletics (2010); Uni-President 7-Eleven Lions (2013–2014)

Career highlights and awards
- Taiwan Series champion (2013)

John Paul "Boof" Bonser (born October 14, 1981) is an American former professional baseball pitcher. He played in Major League Baseball (MLB) for the Minnesota Twins, Boston Red Sox, and Oakland Athletics.

== High school career ==
Bonser attended Gibbs High School, compiling a record of 24–9 and a 1.99 earned run average. In his senior year, he went 7–3 with a 1.88 ERA and hit .523 with 11 home runs. He was named the 2000 Pinellas County High School Player of the Year and played in the 2000 Florida State All-Star game.

== Minor league career ==
Bonser was selected out of high school by the San Francisco Giants in the first round (21st overall) of the 2000 Major League Baseball draft. He made his professional baseball debut at age 18 for the Single-A Salem-Keizer Volcanoes, going 1–4 with a 6.00 ERA in 10 games (nine starts). In 2001, he had a breakout season for the Single-A Hagerstown Suns, leading the South Atlantic League in wins (16), and finishing second in strikeouts (178), which earned him South Atlantic League Most Valuable Pitcher and post-season All-Star honors. After the season, he had his first name legally changed to his childhood nickname, "Boof".

From 2002 through 2003, Bonser progressed steadily through the Giants' system, reaching the Triple-A level at the end of the 2003 season with the Fresno Grizzlies. On November 14, 2003, Bonser was traded to the Minnesota Twins organization, along with pitchers Joe Nathan and Francisco Liriano, for catcher A. J. Pierzynski, and cash. Bonser was assigned to Double-A New Britain for 2004, and was promoted to the Triple-A Rochester Red Wings for a spot start at the end of the season. He then spent the entire 2005 season in Rochester.

As Bonser continued to pitch in the minors without any further breakout seasons, his status as an elite prospect faded, but after a fast start at Rochester in 2006 in which he posted an earned run average of 2.01, he was promoted to the majors.

Bonser was inducted into the Hagerstown Suns Hall of Fame on May 14, 2016.

== Major league career ==
=== Rookie season ===
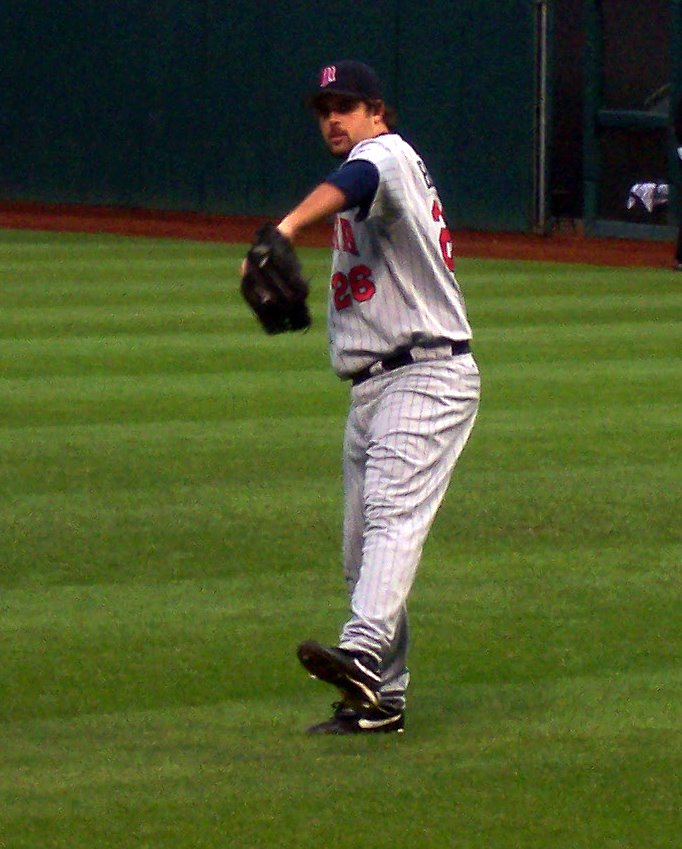
Bonser warming up in Cleveland in 2006

On May 17, 2006, Bonser was called up to the Twins to replace struggling starter Kyle Lohse in the rotation, with Lohse going to Triple-A. Bonser made his major league debut on May 21, as the starting pitcher against the Milwaukee Brewers. In six innings, he allowed one run and struck out eight. On May 27, his second start, Bonser earned his first major league victory in a 9–5 win over the Seattle Mariners. Bonser pitched five innings, giving up eight hits and four runs, including a home run. His second win came against the Chicago Cubs on June 24. He pitched 6 1/3 scoreless innings, allowing six hits and no walks, with one strikeout.

After a disappointing start against the Kansas City Royals on July 4, Bonser was returned to Triple-A Rochester. He had made seven major league starts, going 2–2 with a 5.30 ERA. After a month at Rochester, he was called up to make an emergency start on August 2 in place of the injured Francisco Liriano, then sent back to Rochester after the game, in which he gave up seven runs in four innings.

By August 12, Liriano had been placed on the disabled list, and Bonser was back in Minneapolis to face the Toronto Blue Jays. Although he lost the game, allowing seven hits and three runs over 5 2/3 innings, Twins manager Ron Gardenhire decided to keep him in the starting rotation. As the Twins pushed for a playoff spot in 2006, Bonser solidified the fifth starter's job. Then, a string of injuries and ineffective pitching by other Twins pitchers and Bonser's commanding recent performances earned him the #2 spot in the Twins' postseason rotation. In his postseason start, he pitched six innings, allowing two runs, to pick up a no-decision as the Twins lost to the Oakland Athletics.

Bonser was named the AL Rookie of the Month for September 2006 for his performances in the final month of the season. He finished the season 7–6 with a 4.22 ERA in 18 starts.

=== 2007: First full season ===
Bonser began the 2007 season as the second pitcher in the Twins rotation, behind Johan Santana. Bonser's first two starts were dramatically different, as he followed a six inning start in which he allowed two earned runs by allowing six earned runs in 4 1/3 innings. He then responded with a string of quality starts, but was 2–9 after Memorial Day. In 31 games (30 starts), Bonser posted an 8–12 record with a 5.10 ERA, and had 136 strikeouts in 173 innings pitched.

=== 2008 season ===
After the 2007 season, the Twins organization became worried about Bonser's weight. He had struggled with stamina and pitching late into ball games during the 2007 season, so the Twins encouraged him to lose weight, which he accomplished by a healthier diet, combined with more intense exercise. He lost thirty pounds by the start of the 2008 regular season. Bonser pitched the second game in the 2008 Twins' season, and was the only returning starter who had pitched at least twelve games for the Twins during the previous season.

However, Bonser's weight loss did not help his starting pitching performances through May 31, as he compiled a mark of 2–6 with a 6.16 earned run average, and was demoted to the bullpen to make room for Scott Baker.

After his demotion, Bonser made his first relief appearance for the Twins on June 4 against the Baltimore Orioles. In that game, he pitched 2 2/3 scoreless innings, striking out four and picking up the win.

Through August 23, Bonser's earned run average was 6.22 overall and 6.96 as a reliever.

=== 2009 season ===
On February 25, 2009, Bonser underwent surgery to repair tears in his labrum and rotator cuff, and missed the entire 2009 season.

He was designated for assignment by the Twins on December 8, 2009. On December 10, Bonser was traded to the Boston Red Sox for a player to be named later. That player was minor league right-handed pitcher Chris Province.

=== 2010 season ===
Bonser started the year on the disabled list, and was not activated until June 8. He made two appearances for the Red Sox, giving up two walks, six hits, and four earned runs in two innings pitched. He recorded no outs in the first appearance, accumulating an earned run average of 18.00 in the two appearances. The Red Sox designated him for assignment on June 18, but he elected to become a free agent after refusing minor league assignment on June 28. He signed a minor league contract with the Oakland Athletics and spent July at Triple-A Sacramento. On July 31, Bonser was called up by the A's.

After the A's outrighted Bonser to Sacramento on November 2, he refused the assignment, and elected to become a free agent again.

=== 2011 season ===
On December 7, 2010, Bonser signed a minor league deal with the New York Mets. He made his pitching debut for the Triple-A Buffalo Bisons on April 10, 2011. He pitched 3 2/3 innings, giving up one run on three hits with two walks and four strikeouts. He threw 59 pitches, 35 for strikes. Bonser left the game with an injury in the fourth inning. He underwent Tommy John surgery and did not pitch the rest of the year.

=== 2012 season ===
Bonser signed a minor league contract with the San Francisco Giants on December 28, 2011. He did not pitch in 2012 while still recovering from elbow surgery.

=== 2013 season ===
After posting a 5.87 earned run average at Triple-A Fresno, the Giants released Bonser from his minor league contract on June 27. Just three days later, on June 30, he signed a minor league contract with the Cleveland Indians. The Indians released Bonser on August 2 after he went 0–2 with a 6.00 ERA in three games (one start) with the Triple-A Columbus Clippers of the International League. He finished the season in Taiwan with the Uni-President 7-Eleven Lions of the Chinese Professional Baseball League, going 1–0 with a 1.76 ERA in 11 relief appearances.

=== 2014 season ===
Bonser joined the Bridgeport Bluefish of the Atlantic League of Professional Baseball Clubs where he appeared in 12 games, pitched 16.2 innings, and struck out 15 batters while going 2–0 with a 2.16 earned run average.

Bonser retired on January 4, 2015.
