= Julio DePaula =

Dominican baseball player (born 1982)

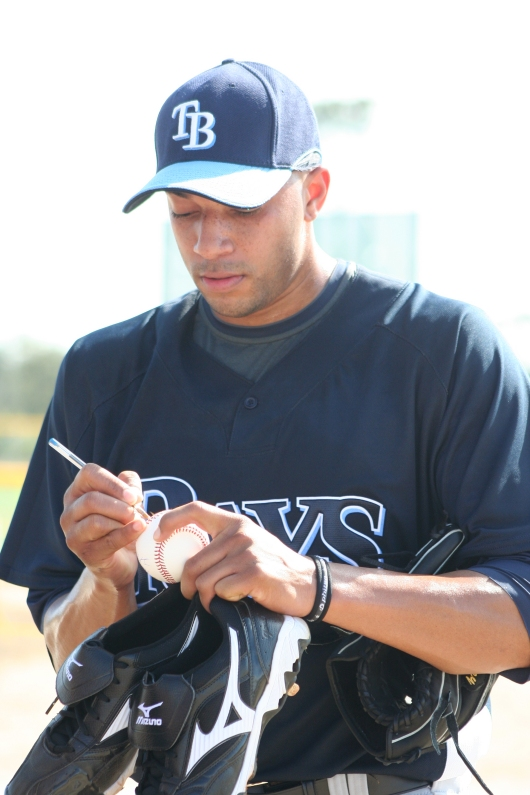
- DePaula with the Tampa Bay Rays
- Pitcher
- Born: December 31, 1982 (age 43); Santo Domingo, Dominican Republic
- Batted: Right Threw: Right

Professional debut
- MLB: May 16, 2007, for the Minnesota Twins
- KBO: March 28, 2010, for the Hanwha Eagles

Last appearance
- MLB: September 29, 2007, for the Minnesota Twins
- KBO: May 27, 2011, for the Hanwha Eagles

MLB statistics
- Win–loss record: 0–1
- Earned run average: 8.55
- Strikeouts: 8

KBO statistics
- Win–loss record: 7–15
- Earned run average: 4.81
- Strikeouts: 102
- Stats at Baseball Reference

Teams
- Minnesota Twins (2007); Hanwha Eagles (2010–2011)

Julio César DePaula (born December 31, 1982) is a Dominican former professional baseball pitcher. He played in Major League Baseball (MLB) for the Minnesota Twins and in the KBO League for the Hanwha Eagles.

== Career ==
=== Minnesota Twins ===
On July 10, 1999, DePaula signed with the Minnesota Twins as an international free agent. He made his professional debut in 2002, splitting the year between the rookie-level Gulf Coast League Twins and Elizabethton Twins. DePaula returned to Elizabethton in 2003, recording a 1.71 ERA with 24 strikeouts and 5 saves across 22 appearances.

DePaula spent 2004 with the Single-A Quad Cities River Bandits, compiling a 12–7 record and 3.05 ERA with 88 strikeouts and 9 saves across 49 appearances. In 2005, he played for the High-A Fort Myers Miracle, accumulating a 2.24 ERA with 51 strikeouts across 36 contests.

DePaula split the 2006 campaign between Fort Myers and the Double-A New Britain Rock Cats. In 51 appearances split between the two affiliates, he compiled a 2.09 ERA with 53 strikeouts and 10 saves across 82 innings pitched. On October 18, 2006, the Twins added DePaula to their 40-man roster to prevent him from reaching minor league free agency.

On May 16, 2007, DePaula was promoted to the major leagues for the first time. He appeared in 16 games for the Twins in his only major league action, struggling to an 8.55 ERA with 8 strikeouts in 20 innings. In 49 appearances for the Triple-A Rochester Red Wings, DePaula pitched to a 12–5 record and 2.90 ERA with 63 strikeouts across 83 2/3 innings pitched.

DePaula spent the entirety of the 2008 season with Triple-A Rochester, accumulating a 5.70 ERA and 65 strikeouts in 77 1/3 innings. On October 24, 2008, he was removed from the 40-man roster and sent outright to Triple-A. DePaula elected free agency following the season on November 3.

=== Tampa Bay Rays ===
On January 6, 2009, DePaula signed a minor league contract with the Tampa Bay Rays. He received an invitation to major league spring training but did not make the club and was assigned to the Triple-A Durham Bulls. In 48 appearances for Durham, DePaula registered a 3.87 ERA with 57 strikeouts across 79 innings pitched. With the Bulls, he won the Triple-A championship, besting the Memphis Redbirds.

=== Hanwha Eagles ===
On December 10, 2009, DePaula signed with the Hanwha Eagles of the KBO League. He made 41 appearances for the Eagles in 2010, accumulating a 6–12 record and 4.58 ERA with 68 strikeouts across 131 2/3 innings pitched. In 2011, DePaula struggled to a 5.48 ERA across 17 games, and was released by Hanwha on June 4, 2011.

=== St. Paul Saints ===
On August 21, 2011, DePaula signed with the St. Paul Saints of the American Association. In four games for the team, he posted a 3.86 ERA with 10 strikeouts across 11 2/3 innings.

=== Rojos del Águila de Veracruz ===
On February 13, 2012, DePaula signed with the Rojos del Águila de Veracruz of the Mexican League. He was released by the team on May 1, after he logged an 2.91 ERA and 15 strikeouts in 21 games.

=== Diablos Rojos del México ===
On May 15, 2012, DePaula signed with the Diablos Rojos del México of the Mexican League. In 11 games for the team, he struggled to an 8.53 ERA with 11 strikeouts across 12 2/3 innings, and was released on June 14.

=== Bridgeport Bluefish ===
On June 29, 2012, DePaula signed with the Bridgeport Bluefish of the Atlantic League. In 31 appearances out of the bullpen, he recorded a 3.03 ERA with 38 strikeouts across 35 2/3 innings of work.

=== York Revolution ===
DePaula remained in the Atlantic League in 2013, signing with the York Revolution. In 50 relief appearances for York, DePaula pitched to a 2.89 ERA with 36 strikeouts across 56 innings pitched.

In 2014, DePaula made 28 appearances out of the bullpen, compiling a 3–2 record and 2.48 ERA with 30 strikeouts across 29 innings of work.

=== Baltimore Orioles ===
On June 26, 2014, DePaula signed a minor league contract with the Baltimore Orioles. On July 7, the Orioles selected his contract, adding him to their active roster. DePaula did not appear in a game for the Orioles, and he was designated for assignment following the activation of Bud Norris the following day. He cleared waivers and was sent outright to the Double-A Bowie Baysox on July 11. In 21 appearances for the Baysox, DePaula compiled a 4.97 ERA with 43 strikeouts and 3 saves across 38 innings pitched. He elected free agency following the season on October 15.

=== Arizona Diamondbacks ===
On November 14, 2014, DePaula signed a minor league contract with the Arizona Diamondbacks. He began the year with the Triple-A Reno Aces, struggling to a 12.71 ERA across three appearances. DePaula was released by the Diamondbacks organization on April 17, 2015.

=== York Revolution (second stint) ===
On May 1, 2015, DePaula signed with the York Revolution of the Atlantic League of Professional Baseball, marking his second stint with the team. In nine appearances for York, he registered a 3.86 ERA with nine strikeouts and two saves in 9 1/3 innings.

=== Rieleros de Aguascalientes ===
On May 21, 2015, DePaula signed with the Toros de Tijuana of the Mexican League, but was released two days later without appearing for the team. On May 24, DePaula signed with the Rieleros de Aguascalientes. In 36 appearances, he compiled a 5–3 record and 3.21 ERA with 42 strikeouts and 8 saves across 53 1/3 innings pitched.

DePaula initially re–signed with the York Revolution for the 2016 season, but on April 8, 2016, he re–signed with Aguascalientes. After allowing one run in 2/3 of an inning in his only appearance, he was released on April 15.

=== York Revolution (third stint) ===
Following his release from Aguascalientes, DePaula signed with the York Revolution of the Atlantic League of Professional Baseball for his third stint with the club. In 42 games, he posted a 4.74 ERA with 21 strikeouts in 43 2/3 innings. On March 15, 2017, DePaula re–signed with York. He made nine appearances for the team in 2015, but struggled to a 6.75 ERA in 9 1/3 innings.

=== Sugar Land Skeeters ===
On May 27, 2017, DePaula was traded from York to the Sugar Land Skeeters. In 41 games for the Skeeters, he recorded a 3.40 ERA with 37 strikeouts and 2 saves. DePaula became a free agent after the 2017 season.

=== Road Warriors ===
On July 24, 2018, DePaula signed with the Road Warriors of the Atlantic League. During the season, he served as the team's pitching coach. In 23 games as a player, DePaula compiled a 1–5 record and 6.89 ERA with 31 strikeouts across 32 2/3 innings of work. He became a free agent following the 2018 season.
