= Carmen Cali =

American baseball player (born 1978)

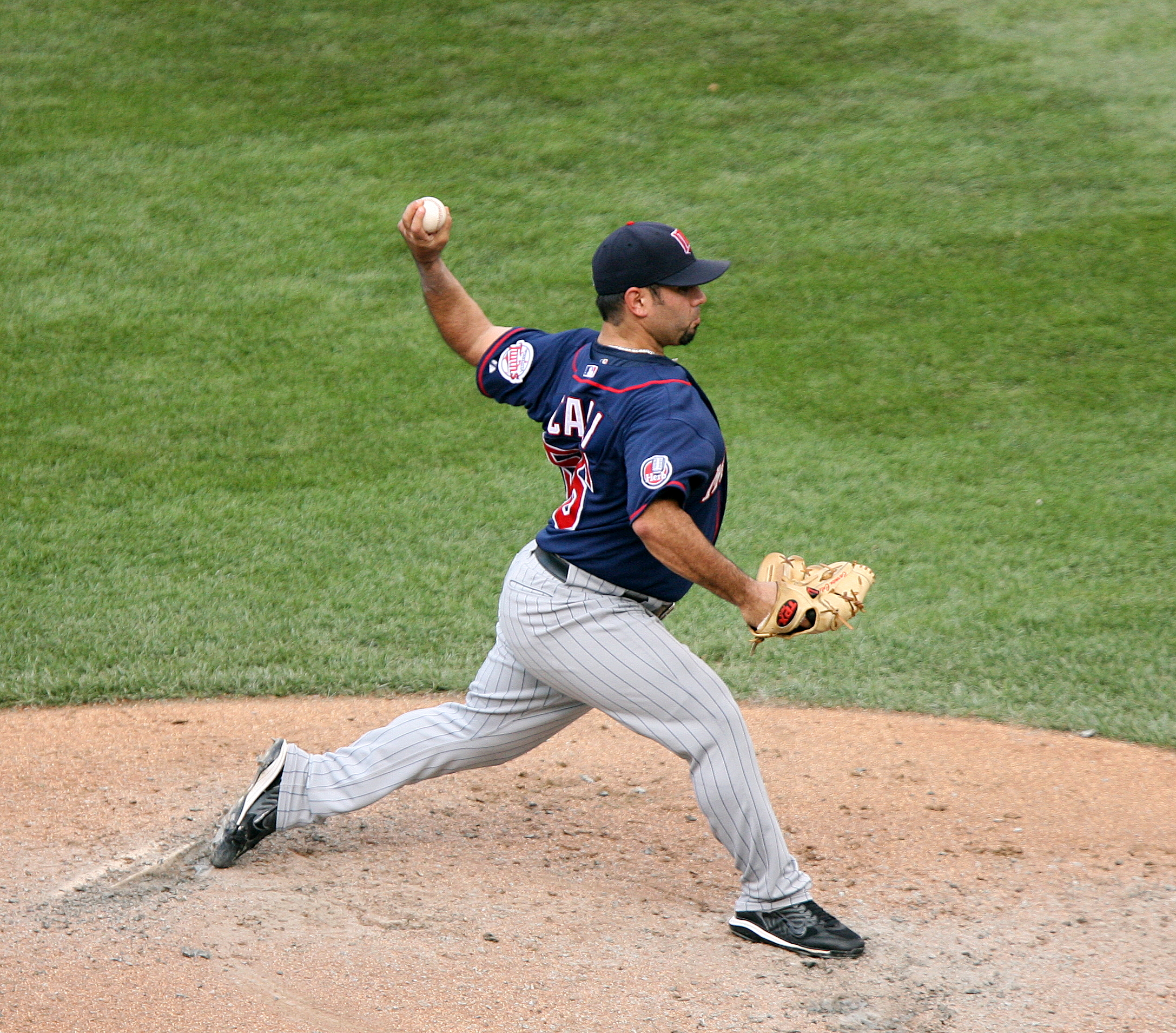
- Cali with the Minnesota Twins in 2007
- Relief pitcher
- Born: November 2, 1978 (age 47); Cleveland, Ohio, U.S.
- Batted: Left Threw: Left

MLB debut
- September 8, 2004, for the St. Louis Cardinals

Last MLB appearance
- September 16, 2007, for the Minnesota Twins

MLB statistics
- Win–loss record: 0–1
- Earned run average: 6.55
- Strikeouts: 27
- Stats at Baseball Reference

Teams
- St. Louis Cardinals (2004–2005); Minnesota Twins (2007)

Carmen Salvatore Cali (born November 2, 1978) is an American former Major League Baseball relief pitcher.

Cali graduated in 1997 from Naples High School in Naples, Florida, after lettering and starring four years in both football and baseball. He went on to graduate from Florida Atlantic University, where he played baseball for the Owls under head coach Kevin Cooney.

He was selected by the St. Louis Cardinals in the 10th round of the 2000 MLB draft and made his minor league debut with the New Jersey Cardinals. He continued through the Cardinals' minor league system, playing with the Peoria Chiefs, Potomac Cannons, Palm Beach Cardinals and Memphis Redbirds.

Cali made his major league debut with the St. Louis Cardinals on September 8, 2004, against the San Diego Padres, working 2/3 of an inning and giving up three runs. He appeared in 10 games for the Cards that September and another six in 2005.

He spent the whole 2006 season in the minors and went on to sign a minor league deal with the Minnesota Twins on December 7, 2006. He spent the season splitting time between the Triple-A Rochester Red Wings and the Twins, appearing in 24 games in the Majors with a record of 0–1 and a 4.71 ERA.

After spending 2008 back in the minors, he became a free agent and signed a minor league contract with the Los Angeles Dodgers. He pitched in seven games for the Double-A Chattanooga Lookouts and nine games for the Triple-A Albuquerque Isotopes before he was released on June 27.
