= Scott Baker (right-handed pitcher) =

American baseball player (born 1981)

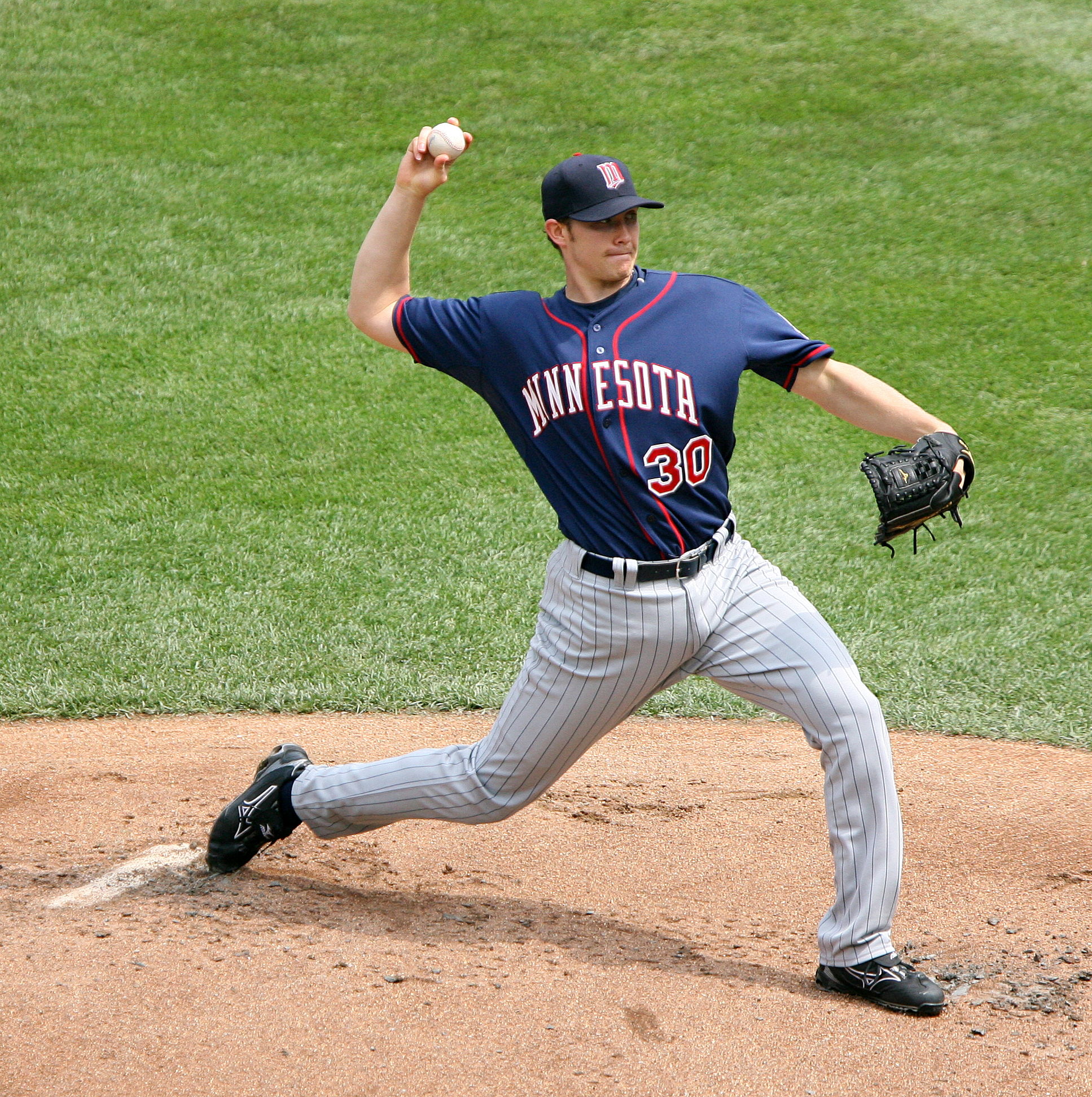
- Baker with the Minnesota Twins
- Pitcher
- Born: September 19, 1981 (age 45); Shreveport, Louisiana, U.S.
- Batted: Right Threw: Right

MLB debut
- May 7, 2005, for the Minnesota Twins

Last MLB appearance
- May 2, 2015, for the Los Angeles Dodgers

MLB statistics
- Win–loss record: 66–53
- Earned run average: 4.26
- Strikeouts: 839
- Stats at Baseball Reference

Teams
- Minnesota Twins (2005–2011); Chicago Cubs (2013); Texas Rangers (2014); Los Angeles Dodgers (2015)

Timothy Scott Baker (born September 19, 1981) is an American former professional baseball player. A starting pitcher, he played in Major League Baseball (MLB) for the Minnesota Twins, Chicago Cubs, Texas Rangers and Los Angeles Dodgers. He bats and throws right-handed.

Baker grew up in Shreveport, Louisiana, and attended Oklahoma State University. He was drafted by the Twins in the second round of the 2003 Major League Baseball draft and reached the major leagues in 2005. In 2006, he made their starting rotation out of Spring training but struggled and was sent to the minor leagues for most of the rest of the season. Beginning 2007 in the minors, he was called up in May and nearly threw a perfect game on August 31. He went 11–4 in 2008 and posted a 3.45 earned run average (ERA). In 2009, Baker logged a career-high 200 innings and started the American League (AL) tiebreaker game against the Detroit Tigers which the Twins won to advance to the postseason. He had a 12–9 record in 2010 but battled injuries towards the end of the year and was left out of the Twins' postseason rotation. Injuries limited Baker in 2011 again, but he was the only Twins' pitcher to post a winning record. He missed 2012 after undergoing Tommy John surgery; this also caused him to miss most of 2013, which he spent with the Chicago Cubs. He began 2014 in the minor leagues but was later added to the Texas Rangers' roster. Baker started eight games for the Rangers but was used mainly as a relief pitcher. In 2015, he signed with the New York Yankees but was released before the season started. Signed by the Los Angeles Dodgers, he started two games for them, the last appearances of his major league career.

== Early years ==
Baker was born September 19, 1981, in Shreveport, Louisiana. He attended Captain Shreve High School in Shreveport, graduating in 2000. He was selected to the All-State team his senior year and played college baseball at Oklahoma State University. In the 2001 season, he was named a Louisville Slugger Freshman All-American. In 2002, he played collegiate summer baseball for the Orleans Cardinals of the Cape Cod Baseball League, and was named a league all-star. In the 2003 season, he was named to the second team All-Big 12. In 2009–10, Baker became part of Captain Shreve's "Circle of Honor."

== Draft and minor league career ==
Baker was drafted by the Minnesota Twins in the second round (58th overall) of the 2003 Major League Baseball draft. He began his minor league career with the Class A Quad Cities River Bandits that same year. In 2004, he played for the Class A-Advanced Fort Myers Miracle, Double-A New Britain Rock Cats, and Triple-A Rochester Red Wings, where he would spend the rest of his minor league career outside of rehab assignments until 2014. In 2004, Baker went a combined 10–8 with a 3.24 ERA in 26 minor league starts. He pitched the majority of his 2005 and 2006 seasons with Rochester. He pitched just seven games in 2007 for the Red Wings before being called up to pitch the rest of his 2007 season with the Twins.

== Major league career ==
=== Minnesota Twins ===
==== 2005 season ====
Baker was called up on May 2, 2005; Baseball Prospectus speculated he might make starts in place of Kyle Lohse; Twins' manager Ron Gardenhire said he might be used to start if Lohse did not continue to improve. Baker did not wind up starting, making his MLB debut by pitching one scoreless inning out of the bullpen in an 8–1 victory over the Tampa Bay Devil Rays on May 7. That was his only appearance with the Twins in May. He was recalled in July to make his first major league start. On July 5, he pitched five innings, giving up just two runs on five hits and striking out five; however, he took the loss in a 2–1 defeat to the Los Angeles Angels of Anaheim. Though he was expected to get sent back to Rochester, Twins' manager Ron Gardenhire had praise for him, saying after the game, "We think we have a quality major leaguer ready to go, and he kind of proved that theory again." A few weeks later, on July 23, Baker had his first career win in Detroit with a 5–2 victory over the Tigers in Game 2 of a doubleheader. He started and pitched seven strong innings, allowing just two runs, but was sent back to Rochester immediately after the game, as he had been called up specifically to start in the doubleheader. On August 29, he returned to the Twins starting rotation for the remainder of the year, making seven consecutive starts to close the season as he replaced Joe Mays in the rotation. Baker finished his rookie year with a record of 3–3 and an earned run average (ERA) of 3.35 in 10 games (nine starts).

==== 2006 season ====
Baker beat out Francisco Liriano to earn the Twins' No. 5 starting spot out of Spring training. However, he struggled with his command, was unable to keep the ball down, and did not live up to the expectations following his rookie season. The 2–5 start with a 6.06 ERA caused Baker to be demoted to Rochester on June 1.

Baker ended up spending nearly the entire second half with the Rochester Red Wings, making only a handful of starts after the demotion. While the Twins played great baseball after a 25–33 start by winning the division on the last game of the regular season, Baker's season was a major disappointment. He finished the year with a 5–8 record and a 6.37 ERA in 16 starts and 83.1 innings, with two of the wins coming against the New York Yankees. Baker did not make the Twins' postseason roster.

==== 2007 season ====
Baker struggled in 2007 spring training, opening the season with Rochester. In May, though, the Twins removed Sidney Ponson from the rotation, giving Baker a chance to start again. In his first start of the season, on May 19, he pitched into the ninth inning, allowing two runs in a 5–2 victory over the Milwaukee Brewers. On July 26, after scuffling in several starts, he struck out a career-high nine hitters over seven innings in a 12-inning, 2–1 victory over the Toronto Blue Jays. He pitched a complete game on July 1, allowing only a home run to Marcus Thames, but that run was the only run of the game in a 1–0 loss to Detroit. He threw eight shutout innings on August 5, earning the victory in a 1–0 win over the Cleveland Indians. On August 31, Baker took a perfect game into the ninth inning against the Kansas City Royals at the Hubert H. Humphrey Metrodome during the second game of a doubleheader, but lost his bid for perfection when he issued a walk to the first batter he faced in the ninth, John Buck. The second hitter after Buck that he faced, Mike Sweeney, hit a single, ending Baker's bid for a no-hitter. Baker finished the game by beating the Royals 5-0 allowing just one hit and completing his second complete game of his career. In 24 games (23 starts), Baker had a 9–9 record, a 4.26 ERA, and 102 strikeouts in 143 2/3 innings.

==== 2008 season ====
Baker opened the 2008 season as the Twins' fifth starter. He won his first two starts of the season, the first coming on April 4 and the second coming on April 9. However, he placed was on the disabled list (DL) on May 7 with a strained right groin. This was the first DL stint of his career, and it lasted until June 5. On June 15, 2008, Baker became the first Twins pitcher to ever throw four strikeouts in the same inning. In the third inning against the Milwaukee Brewers, Baker struck out Ryan Braun, then struck out Prince Fielder, but the ball bounced away from catcher Mike Redmond, so Fielder went to first base. Baker then proceeded to strike out Russell Branyan and Mike Cameron. The last pitcher to record such a feat was Los Angeles Dodgers pitcher Brad Penny, who did it on September 23, 2006, against the Arizona Diamondbacks.

Baker picked up his first career hit against Josh Banks on June 26 and earned the win in a 4–3 victory over the San Diego Padres. On July 20, Baker opened a game against the Texas Rangers with 5 2/3 perfect innings but again wound up losing a game in which he pitched eight innings 1–0 when he allowed a solo home run to Taylor Teagarden. On August 21, he allowed one run in eight innings and earned a no-decision in a 12-inning, 2–1 victory over the Angels. Baker finished the season 11–4 with a 3.45 ERA and 141 strikeouts in 28 starts. His 0.48 ground ball/fly ball ratio was the lowest in the major leagues for 2008. The Twins finished the season tied with the Chicago White Sox for the American League (AL) Central lead, but the White Sox won a one-game playoff, eliminating the Twins.

==== 2009 season ====
Baker was expected to be the Twins' Opening Day starter, but he opened the 2009 season on the disabled list with right shoulder stiffness and posted a 9.15 ERA in his first four starts when he returned. On May 3, he no-hit the Royals through six innings, but he gave up five runs in the seventh inning of that game. He earned his first win on May 8, pitching seven shutout innings in an 11–0 victory over the Seattle Mariners. On May 24, he gave up three runs in 8 1/3 innings and earned the win in a 6–3 victory over Milwaukee. Baker began trying to stand taller in his delivery, and on June 4 he struck out a career-high 10 batters in an 11–3 victory over the Indians. Baker went 4–0 in June, and from July 12 through September 5, he set a career-high with seven straight wins. On August 14, he had a two-hit shutout in an 11–0 win over Cleveland. After sitting seven games out of the AL Central lead on September 6, the Twins forced a tiebreaker with the Tigers, and Baker made the start. He allowed three runs over six innings, left eligible for the win, but took a no-decision. However, the Twins won 6–5 in 12 innings to clinch a trip to the playoffs. He led the Twins with 15 wins, 162 strikeouts, and finished second on the team behind Nick Blackburn with a 4.37 ERA, while pitching a career high 200 innings. However, the Twins were swept in three games in the AL Division Series (ALDS) against the Yankees, preventing Baker from making any playoff appearances.

==== 2010 season ====
Baker started on Opening Day for the Twins to kick off the 2010 season against the Angels but allowed four earned runs in 4 2/3 innings, taking the loss in a 6–3 defeat. He won his next start, allowing one run in seven innings in a 2–1 victory over the Chicago White Sox on April 10. Through May 8, he went 4–2. On June 16, Baker struck out a career-best 12 batters through seven innings in a 2–1 victory over the Colorado Rockies. He picked up his 50th career win on July 2, allowing one earned run in seven innings in a 2–1 victory over the Tampa Bay Rays. On August 10, he allowed five runs (four earned) in six innings but earned his 10th win of the season in a 12–6 victory over the White Sox. He left a start with elbow pain on September 2 and did not pitch again until September 21. Baker finished the season on a 9–1 stretch and helped the Twins repeat as winners of the AL Central. In 29 starts, he had a 12–9 record, a 4.49 ERA, and 148 strikeouts in 170 1/3 innings. During the season, he moved from 22nd to 12th all-time on the Twins' strikeout list. Baker was left out of the Twins' postseason rotation, though he was a member of their bullpen. He made his playoff debut in Game 3 of the ALDS, allowing one run in 2 1/3 innings as the Twins were again swept by the Yankees.

==== 2011 season ====
Baker had to compete with Kevin Slowey for the starting rotation in 2011, but he won the competition and entered the season as the Twins' No. 5 starter. He threw seven shutout innings on April 21 in a 3–1 victory over the Baltimore Orioles. He threw a complete game on June 11, allowing one run and striking out seven in an 8–1 victory over the Rangers. One week later, he threw eight shutout innings and had 10 strikeouts in a 1–0 victory over the San Diego Padres. Baker had a strong season before missing time with injuries. His ERA at the end of July was 2.86, and he made two starts in August before spending much of the rest of the season on the disabled list with an injured elbow. He finished the season with an 8–6 record and a 3.14 ERA in 23 games (21 starts). Baker was the Twins only starting pitcher to have a winning record in 2011, and he led the team in ERA, strikeouts (123), and WHIP (1.17).

==== 2012 season ====
Baker began 2012 on the disabled list due to elbow tendinitis. He made a rehab start with the Class A Fort Myers Miracle in their first game of the season but threw just 11 pitches in the start before leaving the game after talking to the trainers. It was announced on April 11 that Baker would miss the entire 2012 season with Tommy John surgery. Baker said:

It's something that I've been battling for a while. I don't mind pitching through pain, as long as you don't have the chance to further the injury. But when it comes to a point where your velocity's not there and you don't have the ability to finish pitches like you know you're capable of doing, then something's got to be done.

On October 29, the Twins announced they declined their club option for Baker worth $9.25 million, ending Baker's tenure with the team.

=== Chicago Cubs ===
On November 13, 2012, the Chicago Cubs announced they signed Baker to a one-year deal worth $5.5 million with $1.5 million in possible bonuses. Due to various setbacks and injuries that lingered throughout the season, Baker did not pitch for the Cubs until September. He made his first start since 2011 on September 8, pitching five shutout innings in a 3–1 loss to the Brewers. "It felt very good," Baker said after the game.

There were some emotions there. It's been a long road and I was happy my family was here to share this moment because they're just as much a part of this as I am. Rehab process is hard on everyone just not the player himself. It's been a long road so that definitely plays into it being a very special day for me and my family.

He started three games for the Cubs, with no record and a 3.60 ERA in 15 innings.

=== Seattle Mariners ===
On January 29, 2014, Baker signed a minor-league deal with the Seattle Mariners. After posting a 6.75 ERA in four Spring training starts with the Mariners and refusing a minor league assignment, Baker was released on March 24.

=== Texas Rangers ===
On March 25, 2014, Baker signed a minor league deal with the Texas Rangers. He was brought up to the Rangers on May 7, to serve as a long reliever. He was designated for assignment after throwing 5 1/3 innings of relief in a game, with the Rangers needing more-rested arms in their bullpen, but he was soon recalled. He was added to the rotation on May 23 when the Rangers moved Robbie Ross to the bullpen. However, Baker returned to a long relief role after two starts when Joe Saunders came off the DL. Late in the season, Baker was again used as a starter, making starts August 24, August 29, September 5, and September 27. In 25 games (eight starts), Baker had a 3–4 record, a 5.47 ERA, 55 strikeouts, and 14 walks in 80 2/3 innings. On October 30, he became a free agent.

=== New York Yankees ===
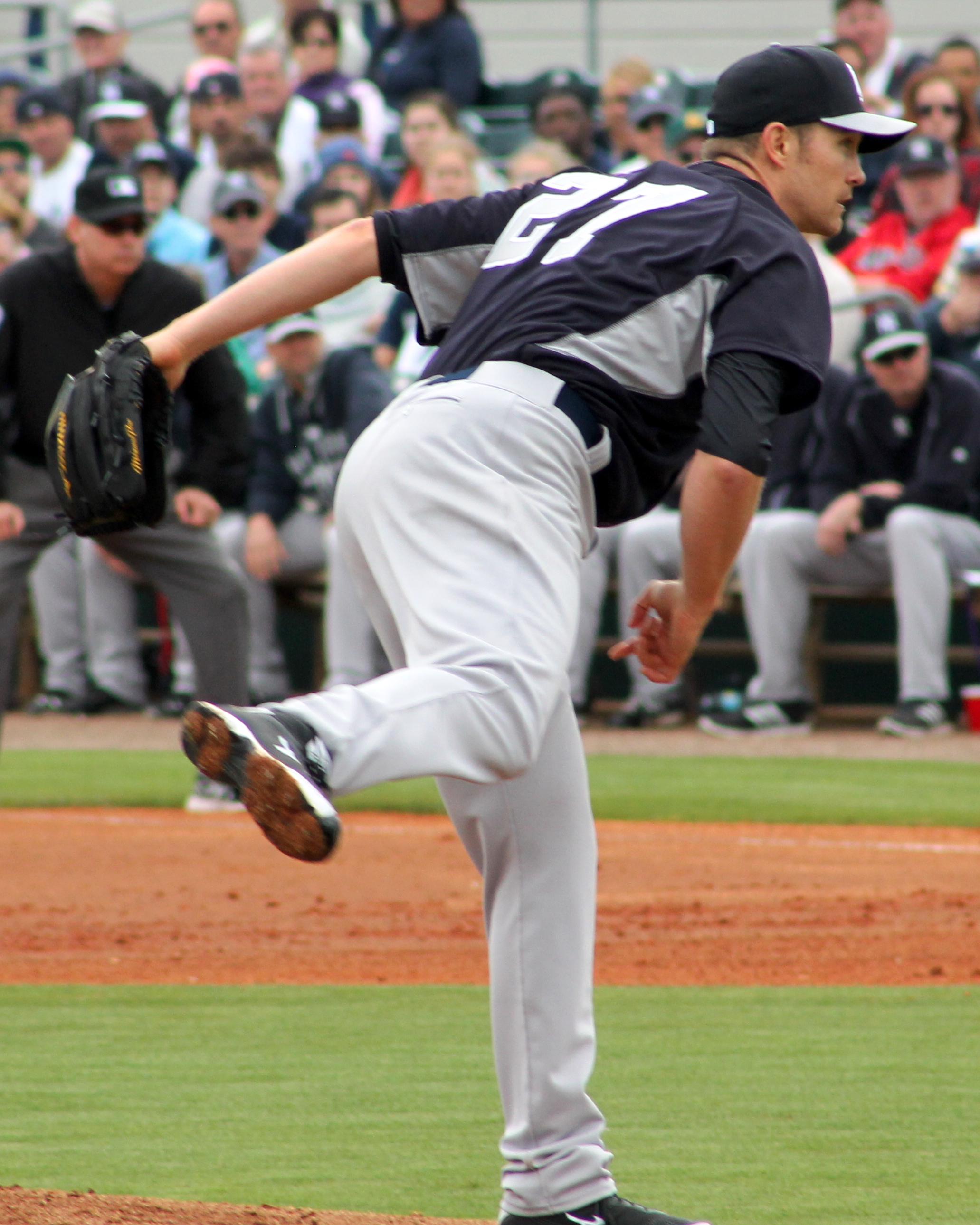
Baker with the New York Yankees

On January 23, 2015, Baker signed with the New York Yankees to a minor league contract worth $1.5 million if he made the major league roster. He struggled in spring training, allowing nine earned runs in 10 1/3 innings before drawing his release on March 29.

=== Los Angeles Dodgers ===
On April 9, 2015, he signed a minor league contract with the Los Angeles Dodgers and was assigned to the Triple-A Oklahoma City Dodgers. He made three starts for Oklahoma City in April and was 1–1 with a 1.06 ERA. In a seven inning game (shortened due to it being the first game of a doubleheader) against the Iowa Cubs on April 20, Baker came within one strike of pitching a perfect game, retiring the first 20 batters he faced before Addison Russell's double up the middle with two strikes on him. The Dodgers purchased his contract and called him up to the Majors to make a spot start against the San Diego Padres on April 26. He made two starts for the Dodgers and was 0–1 with a 5.73 ERA before he was designated for assignment on May 3, 2015, he cleared waivers and was sent outright to Triple-A Oklahoma City Dodgers on May 5. He made 13 starts in Triple-A and was 7–3 with a 3.39 ERA. He left a start in July because of injury and spent the rest of the season on the disabled list. He elected free agency on October 6.

== Pitching style ==
Baker threw a fastball, a cut fastball, a slider, a changeup, and a curveball. The fastball was his main pitch, which he threw over 60 percent of the time; it had an average velocity in the high nineties for much of his career. After Baker's return in 2013, his average fastball velocity had dropped to the high eighties, and he stopped throwing the curveball after the 2013 season.

Baker has been a good control pitcher throughout his career, finishing in the top 10 in the American League in strikeout-to-walk ratio three times. He has the fourth-best strikeout-to-walk ratio in the history of the Twins, including their time as the Washington Senators, at 3.438 (behind Slowey's 4.702, Jim Merritt's 3.904, and Johan Santana's 3.794); he also has the eighth-best strikeouts per 9 innings pitched number in Twins' history (7.234).

== Personal life ==
Baker and his wife Leann have three children. His wife died of ALS on June 15, 2025. He is known for being soft-spoken. Since a "young age", Baker has been a Christian. He says, "I can't tell you how much I appreciated my parents for [bringing me to church]" and that he is "eternally grateful." He especially enjoys Paul's letters to the churches, saying, "It gives you hope... insight... peace in our daily lives." He credited his faith with helping him after he was sent to the minor leagues in 2006.

== See also ==
- List of Major League Baseball single-inning strikeout leaders
