= 2008 Detroit Tigers season =

Major League Baseball season

2008 Detroit Tigers
- League: American League
- Division: Central
- Ballpark: Comerica Park
- City: Detroit
- Record: 74–88 (.457)
- Divisional place: 5th
- Owners: Mike Ilitch
- General managers: Dave Dombrowski
- Managers: Jim Leyland
- Television: Fox Sports Detroit (Mario Impemba, Rod Allen)
- Radio: Detroit Tigers Radio Network (Dan Dickerson, Jim Price)
- Stats: ESPN.com; Baseball Reference

The Detroit Tigers 2008 season was the team's 108th season in Major League Baseball's American League. After being picked by many to win the American League Central and the World Series, the Tigers started the season a disappointing 0–7 after being swept by the Kansas City Royals and Chicago White Sox. Their first victory of the season came against the Boston Red Sox. The Tigers did not reach a .500 winning percentage until their 80th game of the season.

Although they were eliminated from the pennant race by the season's final day (September 29), they nonetheless had to play a makeup game against the White Sox (who were trailing the Minnesota Twins by half a game), which Detroit had lost 8–2. The Tigers finished the season in last place in the AL Central for the first time since 2003, trailing the White Sox (who won the division by beating Minnesota in a one-game playoff the following day) by 14.5 games. This was the Tigers' first losing season since 2005.

Despite the disappointing performance, the Tigers drew a franchise-record home attendance of 3,202,645 for the season. The team ranked third in the American League and eighth in Major League Baseball for home attendance in 2008.

== Offseason ==
The Tigers started the offseason by trading prospects Jair Jurrjens and Gorkys Hernández to the Atlanta Braves for shortstop Édgar Rentería. Rentería took over the everyday shortstop job with Carlos Guillén moving to first base.

Reliever Joel Zumaya underwent surgery on October 31, 2007, for an AC joint reconstruction and was expected to miss half the 2008 season.

The Tigers continued their offseason trading by acquiring Miguel Cabrera and Dontrelle Willis from the Florida Marlins in exchange for highly touted prospects Cameron Maybin and Andrew Miller, along with Mike Rabelo, Eulogio De La Cruz, Burke Badenhop and Dallas Trahern. Willis would sign a three-year, $29 million contract extension, while Cabrera would receive an eight-year, $152.3 million deal, the biggest contract in Tigers history.

During the offseason, the Tigers traded Omar Infante to the Chicago Cubs for Jacque Jones. They re-signed Todd Jones, and Kenny Rogers to one-year contracts. The Tigers also signed free agent Francisco Cruceta from the Texas Rangers organization to a one-year contract. Cruceta and Jacque Jones were eventually released during the season, and Todd Jones retired at the end of the season. The Tigers declined the option to sign Édgar Rentería at the end of the season.

== Regular season ==
=== Season standings ===
AL Central
Team	W	L	Pct.	GB	Home	Road
Chicago White Sox	89	74	.546	—	54‍–‍28	35‍–‍46
Minnesota Twins	88	75	.540	1	53‍–‍28	35‍–‍47
Cleveland Indians	81	81	.500	7½	45‍–‍36	36‍–‍45
Kansas City Royals	75	87	.463	13½	38‍–‍43	37‍–‍44
Detroit Tigers	74	88	.457	14½	40‍–‍41	34‍–‍47

=== Record vs. opponents ===
2008 American League record Source: MLB Standings Grid – 2008
Team	BAL	BOS	CWS	CLE	DET	KC	LAA	MIN	NYY	OAK	SEA	TB	TEX	TOR	NL
Baltimore	–	6–12	4–5	4–4	4–3	5–3	3–6	3–3	7–11	0–5	8–2	3–15	4–5	6–12	11–7
Boston	12–6	–	4–3	5–1	5–2	6–1	1–8	4–3	9–9	6–4	6–3	8–10	9–1	9–9	11–7
Chicago	5–4	3–4	–	11–7	12–6	12–6	5–5	9–10	2–5	5–4	5–1	4–6	3–3	1–7	12–6
Cleveland	4–4	1–5	7–11	–	11–7	10–8	4–5	8–10	4–3	5–4	4–5	5–2	6–4	6–1	6–12
Detroit	3–4	2–5	6–12	7–11	–	7–11	3–6	7–11	4–2	3–6	7–3	3–4	6–3	3–5	13–5
Kansas City	3–5	1–6	6–12	8–10	11–7	–	2–3	6–12	5–5	6–3	7–2	3–5	2–7	2–5	13–5
Los Angeles	6–3	8–1	5–5	5–4	6–3	3–2	–	5–3	7–3	10–9	14–5	3–6	12–7	6–3	10–8
Minnesota	3–3	3–4	10–9	10–8	11–7	12–6	3–5	–	4–6	5–5	5–4	3–3	5–5	0–6	14–4
New York	11–7	9–9	5–2	3–4	2–4	5–5	3–7	6–4	–	5–1	7–2	11–7	3–4	9–9	10–8
Oakland	5–0	4–6	4–5	4–5	6–3	3–6	9–10	5–5	1–5	-	10–9	3–6	7–12	4–6	10–8
Seattle	2–8	3–6	1–5	5–4	3–7	2–7	5–14	4–5	2–7	9–10	–	3–4	8–11	5–4	9–9
Tampa Bay	15–3	10–8	6–4	2–5	4–3	5–3	6–3	3–3	7–11	6–3	4–3	–	6–3	11–7	12–6
Texas	5–4	1–9	3–3	4–6	3–6	7–2	7–12	5–5	4–3	12–7	11–8	3–6	–	4–4	10–8
Toronto	12–6	9–9	7–1	1–6	5–3	5–2	3–6	6–0	9–9	6–4	4–5	7–11	4–4	–	8–10

=== Game log ===
Legend
Tigers win	Tigers loss	Game postponed

2008 Game Log (74–88)
March (0–1)

#	Date	Opponent	Score	Win	Loss	Save	Attendance	Record
1	March 31	Royals	5 – 4 (11)	Núñez (1–0)	Bautista (0–1)	Soria (1)	44,934	0–1

April (13–14)

#	Date	Opponent	Score	Win	Loss	Save	Attendance	Record
2	April 2	Royals	4–0	Bannister (1–0)	Rogers (0–1)		32,348	0–2
3	April 3	Royals	4–1	Greinke (1–0)	Bonderman (0–1)	Soria (2)	32,735	0–3
4	April 4	White Sox	8–5	Logan (1–0)	Grilli (0–1)	Jenks (2)	34,569	0–4
5	April 5	White Sox	5–3	Floyd (1–0)	Miner (0–1)	Jenks (3)	42,381	0–5
6	April 6	White Sox	13–2	Buehrle (1–0)	Verlander (0–1)		35,230	0–6
7	April 8	@ Red Sox	5–0	Matsuzaka (2–0)	Rogers (0–2)		36,567	0–7
8	April 9	@ Red Sox	7–2	Bonderman (1–1)	Lester (1–2)		37,190	1–7
9	April 10	@ Red Sox	12–6	Wakefield (1–0)	Robertson (0–1)	Papelbon (3)	37,612	1–8
10	April 11	@ White Sox	5–2	López (1–0)	Contreras (0–1)	Jones (1)	26,094	2–8
11	April 12	@ White Sox	7–0	Floyd (2–0)	Verlander (0–2)		29,649	2–9
12	April 13	@ White Sox	11–0	Vázquez (2–1)	Rogers (0–3)		26,294	2–10
13	April 14	Twins	11–9	Beltrán (1–0)	Neskek (0–1)	Jones (2)	32,002	3–10
14	April 15	Twins	6–5	Rapada (1–0)	Crain (0–1)	Jones (3)	30,901	4–10
15	April 16	@ Indians	13–2	Galarraga (1–0)	Sabathia (0–3)		17,644	5–10
16	April 17	@ Indians	11–1	Carmona (2–1)	Verlander (0–3)		21,547	5–11
17	April 18	@ Blue Jays	8–4	Rogers (1–3)	Accardo (0–3)		24,294	6–11
18	April 19	@ Blue Jays	3–2	McGowan (1–1)	Bonderman (1–2)	Ryan (2)	31,052	6–12
19	April 20	@ Blue Jays	5–3	Burnett (2–1)	Robertson (0–2)	Accardo (4)	30,139	6–13
20	April 21	@ Blue Jays	5–1	Galarraga (2–0)	Marcum (2–1)		25,287	7–13
21	April 22	Rangers	10–2	Verlander (1–3)	Padilla (2–2)		33,629	8–13
22	April 23	Rangers	19–6	Rapada (2–0)	Francisco (0–1)		34,245	9–13
23	April 24	Rangers	8–2	Miner (1–1)	Jennings (0–4)		39,058	10–13
24	April 25	Angels	4–3	Santana (4–0)	Robertson (0–3)	Rodríguez (10)	40,380	10–14
25	April 26	Angels	6–4	López (2–0)	O'Day (0–1)	Jones (4)	42,068	11–14
26	April 27	Angels	6–2	Weaver (2–3)	Verlander (1–4)		36,347	11–15
27	April 29	@ Yankees	6–4	Rogers (2–3)	Hughes (0–4)	Jones (5)	49,194	12–15
28	April 30	@ Yankees	6–2	Bonderman (2–2)	Pettitte (3–3)		49,513	13–15

May (10–17)

#	Date	Opponent	Score	Win	Loss	Save	Attendance	Record
29	May 1	@ Yankees	8–4	Robertson (1–3)	Albaladejo (0–1)		50,993	14–15
30	May 2	@ Twins	11–1	Hernández (4–1)	Galarraga (2–1)		33,628	14–16
31	May 3	@ Twins	4–1	Bass (1–0)	Verlander (1–5)	Nathan (10)	28,985	14–17
32	May 4	@ Twins	7–6	Guerrier (2–1)	Miner (1–2)	Nathan (11)	29,821	14–18
33	May 5	Red Sox	6–3	Matsuzaka (5–0)	Bonderman (2–3)	Papelbon (10)	39,478	14–19
34	May 6	Red Sox	5–0	Wakefield (3–1)	Robertson (1–4)		38,564	14–20
35	May 7	Red Sox	10–9	Jones (1–0)	Papelbon (2–1)		38,062	15–20
36	May 8	Red Sox	5–1	Beckett (4–2)	Verlander (1–6)		38,952	15–21
37	May 9	Yankees	6–5	Rogers (3–3)	Igawa (0–1)		44,062	16–21
38	May 10	Yankees	5–2	Rasner (2–0)	Bonderman (2–4)	Rivera (10)	44,580	16–22
–	May 11	Yankees	Postponed (rain) – Rescheduled for September 1					
39	May 13	@ Royals	3–2	Núñez (3–0)	Cruceta (0–1)	Soria (9)	11,703	16–23
40	May 14	@ Royals	2–0	Hochevar (3–2)	Verlander (1–7)	Soria (10)	14,053	16–24
41	May 15	@ Royals	8–4	Meche (3–5)	Rogers (3–4)		34,734	16–25
42	May 16	@ D-backs	4–3	Haren (5–2)	Miner (1–3)	Peña (1)	33,531	16–26
43	May 17	@ D-backs	3–2	Galarraga (3–1)	Scherzer (0–2)	Jones (6)	48,804	17–26
44	May 18	@ D-backs	4–0	Johnson (4–1)	Robertson (1–4)		38,793	17–27
45	May 20	Mariners	12–8	Verlander (2–7)	Silva (3–3)	Jones (7)	39,463	18–27
46	May 21	Mariners	9–4	Rogers (4–4)	Washburn (2–6)		36,495	19–27
47	May 22	Mariners	9–2	Bonderman (3–4)	Batista (3–6)	Dolsi (1)	40,166	20–27
48	May 23	Twins	9–4	Slowey (1–4)	Galarraga (3–2)		40,732	20–28
49	May 24	Twins	19–3	Robertson (2–4)	Bonser (2–6)		41,137	21–28
50	May 25	Twins	6–1	Perkins (2–1)	Cruceta (0–2)		42,413	21–29
51	May 26	@ Angels	1–0	Arredondo (1–0)	Dolsi (0–1)		41,031	21–30
52	May 27	@ Angels	3–2	Santana (7–2)	López (2–1)		36,569	21–31
53	May 28	@ Angels	6–2	Galarraga (4–2)	Saunders (8–2)		42,191	22–31
54	May 30	@ Mariners	7–4	Robertson (3–5)	Silva (3–5)	Jones (8)	34,019	23–31
55	May 31	@ Mariners	5–0	Hernández (3–5)	Verlander (2–8)		33,441	23–32

June (19–8)

#	Date	Opponent	Score	Win	Loss	Save	Attendance	Record
56	June 1	@ Mariners	7–5	Miner (2–3)	Putz (2–3)		38,610	24–32
57	June 2	@ Athletics	3–2	Street (1–1)	Cruceta (0–3)		11,772	24–33
58	June 3	@ Athletics	5–4	Gaudin (5–3)	Seay (0–1)		10,871	24–34
59	June 4	@ Athletics	10–2	Duchscherer (5–4)	Robertson (3–6)		19,258	24–35
60	June 6	Indians	4–2	Byrd (3–5)	Verlander (2–9)	Borowski (5)	40,990	24–36
61	June 7	Indians	8–4	Miner (3–3)	Kobayashi (3–3)	Jones (9)	42,193	25–36
62	June 8	Indians	5–2	Galarraga (5–2)	Sowers (0–1)	Jones (10)	39,941	26–36
63	June 9	Indians	8–2	Lee (10–1)	Willis (0–1)		38,440	26–37
64	June 10	White Sox	6–4	Robertson (4–6)	Contreras (6–4)	Jones (11)	38,295	27–37
65	June 11	White Sox	4–1	Verlander (3–9)	Vázquez (6–5)		38,693	28–37
66	June 12	White Sox	2–1	Jones (2–0)	Dotel (3–3)		40,297	29–37
67	June 13	Dodgers	5–0	Galarraga (6–2)	Lowe (4–6)	Dolsi (2)	40,430	30–37
68	June 14	Dodgers	12–7	Bonine (1–0)	Penny (5–9)		42,348	31–37
69	June 15	Dodgers	5–4	Robertson (5–6)	Park (2–2)	Jones (12)	41,189	32–37
70	June 16	@ Giants	8–6	Yabu (3–3)	Dolsi (0–2)		33,317	32–38
71	June 17	@ Giants	5–1	Rogers (5–4)	Sánchez (6–4)		33,636	33–38
72	June 18	@ Giants	7–2	Galarraga (7–2)	Zito (2–11)		38,194	34–38
73	June 20	@ Padres	6–2	Bell (5–3)	Rodney (0–1)		40,683	34–39
74	June 21	@ Padres	7–5	Robertson (6–6)	Baek (1–2)	Jones (13)	34,749	35–39
75	June 22	@ Padres	5–3	Verlander (4–9)	Wolf (5–6)	Jones (14)	28,779	36–39
76	June 24	Cardinals	8–4	Looper (9–5)	Rogers (5–5)		44,446	36–40
77	June 25	Cardinals	8–7	Jones (3–0)	McClellan (0–3)		40,091	37–40
78	June 26	Cardinals	3–2	Seay (1–1)	Parisi (0–4)		41,022	38–40
79	June 27	Rockies	7–1	Bonine (2–0)	Jiménez (2–8)		40,842	39–40
80	June 28	Rockies	7–6	Dolsi (1–2)	Fuentes (1–3)		42,729	40–40
81	June 29	Rockies	4–3	Rogers (6–5)	Reynolds (2–6)	Jones (15)	41,305	41–40
82	June 30	@ Twins	5–4	Fossum (1–0)	Guerrier (4–3)	Zumaya (1)	22,196	42–40

July (13–13)

#	Date	Opponent	Score	Win	Loss	Save	Attendance	Record
83	July 1	@ Twins	6–4	Baker (5–2)	Robertson (6–7)	Nathan (23)	23,754	42–41
84	July 2	@ Twins	7–0	Blackburn (7–4)	Bonine (2–1)		30,102	42–42
85	July 3	@ Mariners	8–4	Verlander (5–9)	Silva (4–10)	Rodney (1)	22,523	43–42
86	July 4	@ Mariners	4–1	Bédard (6–4)	Rogers (6–6)	Morrow (6)	30,564	43–43
87	July 5	@ Mariners	3–2	Batista (4–10)	Rodney (0–2)	Morrow (7)	30,373	43–44
88	July 6	@ Mariners	2 – 1 (15)	López (3–1)	Burke (0–1)	Jones (16)	29,083	44–44
89	July 8	Indians	9–2	Verlander (6–9)	Sowers (0–5)		40,443	45–44
90	July 9	Indians	8–6	Jones (4–0)	Lewis (0–3)		41,062	46–44
91	July 10	Twins	7 – 6 (11)	Guerrier (5–4)	Dolsi (1–3)		41,952	46–45
92	July 11	Twins	3–2	Perkins (6–2)	Galarraga (7–3)	Nathan (26)	42,352	46–46
93	July 12	Twins	6–5	Baker (6–2)	Robertson (6–8)	Nathan (27)	41,301	46–47
94	July 13	Twins	4–2	Verlander (7–9)	Blackburn (7–5)	Jones (17)	41,453	47–47
95	July 17	@ Orioles	6–5	Rogers (7–6)	Olson (6–5)	Jones (18)	23,224	48–47
96	July 18	@ Orioles	7–4	Guthrie (6–7)	Galarraga (7–4)	Sherrill (29)	29,111	48–48
97	July 19	@ Orioles	11 – 10 (10)	Sherrill (3–4)	Dolsi (1–4)		31,525	48–49
98	July 20	@ Orioles	5–1	Verlander (8–9)	Burres (7–6)		23,278	49–49
99	July 21	@ Royals	19–4	Miner (4–3)	Hochevar (6–8)		14,137	50–49
100	July 22	@ Royals	7–1	Rogers (8–6)	Davies (3–2)		22,074	51–49
101	July 23	@ Royals	7–1	Galarraga (8–4)	Greinke (7–7)		16,594	52–49
102	July 25	White Sox	6–5	Carrasco (1–0)	Jones (4–1)	Jenks (20)	44,393	52–50
103	July 26	White Sox	7–6	Danks (8–4)	Verlander (8–10)	Jenks (21)	45,280	52–51
104	July 27	White Sox	6–4	Miner (5–3)	Vázquez (7–9)		41,790	53–51
105	July 28	@ Indians	5–0	Byrd (5–10)	Rogers (8–7)		24,689	53–52
106	July 29	@ Indians	8–5	Galarraga (9–4)	Ginter (1–2)		30,625	54–52
107	July 30	@ Indians	14–12	Fossum (2–0)	Rincón (2–3)		26,596	55–52
108	July 31	@ Indians	9–4	Carmona (5–3)	Verlander (8–11)		34,186	55–53

August (11–17)

#	Date	Opponent	Score	Win	Loss	Save	Attendance	Record
109	August 1	@ Rays	5–2	Balfour (3–1)	Miner (5–4)	Percival (24)	26,403	55–54
110	August 2	@ Rays	9–3	Sonnanstine (11–6)	Rogers (8–8)		36,048	55–55
111	August 3	@ Rays	6 – 5 (10)	Miller (1–0)	Rodney (0–3)		33,438	55–56
112	August 5	@ White Sox	10 – 8 (14)	Russell (4–0)	Zumaya (0–1)		35,371	55–57
113	August 6	@ White Sox	5–1	Danks (9–4)	Verlander (8–12)		34,124	55–58
114	August 7	@ White Sox	8–3	Miner (6–4)	Vázquez (8–10)	Rodney (2)	36,383	56–58
115	August 8	Athletics	4–2	Braden (3–2)	Rogers (8–9)	Ziegler (1)	41,457	56–59
116	August 9	Athletics	10–2	Galarraga (10–4)	Meyer (0–1)		41,308	57–59
117	August 10	Athletics	6–1	Robertson (7–8)	Smith (5–11)	Rodney (3)	40,743	58–59
118	August 11	Blue Jays	7–2	Marcum (7–5)	Verlander (8–13)		39,718	58–60
119	August 12	Blue Jays	6–4	Burnett (15–9)	Zumaya (0–2)	Ryan (23)	39,790	58–61
120	August 13	Blue Jays	4–3	Purcey (2–3)	Rogers (8–10)	League (1)	39,073	58–62
121	August 14	Blue Jays	5–1	Galarraga (11–4)	Frasor (1–2)		41,259	59–62
122	August 15	Orioles	11–2	Cormier (2–3)	Robertson (7–9)		40,546	59–63
123	August 16	Orioles	5–3	Verlander (9–13)	Sarfate (4–3)	Rodney (4)	41,727	60–63
124	August 17	Orioles	16–8	Cabrera (2–1)	Fossum (2–1)		40,586	60–64
125	August 18	@ Rangers	8–7	Rogers (9–10)	Francisco (2–5)	Rodney (5)	17,786	61–64
126	August 19	@ Rangers	11–3	Galarraga (12–4)	Padilla (12–7)		18,470	62–64
127	August 20	@ Rangers	9–1	Millwood (7–7)	Robertson (7–10)		19,403	62–65
128	August 22	@ Royals	4–3	Verlander (10–13)	Bannister (7–13)	Rodney (6)	18,361	63–65
129	August 23	@ Royals	4–0	Miner (7–4)	Davies (5–5)		27,346	64–65
130	August 24	@ Royals	7–3	Duckworth (1–0)	Rogers (9–11)		16,663	64–66
131	August 25	Indians	4 – 3 (10)	Donnelly (1–0)	Glover (1–3)	Lewis (7)	39,196	64–67
132	August 26	Indians	10–4	Lee (19–2)	Lambert (0–1)		38,774	64–68
133	August 27	Indians	9–7	Carmona (7–5)	Verlander (10–14)		38,519	64–69
134	August 29	Royals	6–3	Miner (8–4)	Davies (5–6)		40,206	65–69
135	August 30	Royals	13–3	Duckworth (2–0)	Rogers (9–12)		40,623	65–70
136	August 31	Royals	4–2	Glover (2–3)	Wells (0–1)	Rodney (7)	39,782	66–70

September (8–18)

#	Date	Opponent	Score	Win	Loss	Save	Attendance	Record
137	September 1	Yankees	13–9	Bruney (2–0)	Verlander (10–15)		44,336	66–71
138	September 2	Angels	5–4	Shields (6–4)	Rodney (0–4)	Rodríguez (54)	35,320	66–72
139	September 3	Angels	9–6	Farnsworth (2–2)	Arredondo (7–2)	Rodney (8)	36,671	67–72
140	September 4	Angels	7–1	Santana (15–5)	Rogers (9–13)		37,890	67–73
141	September 5	@ Twins	10–2	Liriano (5–3)	Galarraga (12–5)		24,424	67–74
142	September 6	@ Twins	6–4	Rapada (3–0)	Guerrier (6–7)	Rodney (9)	42,606	68–74
143	September 7	@ Twins	7–5	Lambert (1–1)	Perkins (12–4)	Rodney (10)	31,236	69–74
144	September 8	Athletics	14–8	Fossum (3–1)	Gonzalez (1–4)		37,981	70–74
145	September 9	Athletics	3–2	Devine (5–1)	Rodney (0–5)	Ziegler (7)	37,240	70–75
146	September 10	Athletics	5–2	Street (6–5)	Galarraga (12–6)	Ziegler (8)	37,194	70–76
–	September 12	@ White Sox	Postponed (rain) Rescheduled for September 13					
–	September 13	@ White Sox	Postponed (rain) Rescheduled for September 14					
–	September 13	@ White Sox	Postponed (rain) Rescheduled for September 29					
147	September 14	@ White Sox	4–2	Vázquez (12–13)	Verlander (10–16)		N/A	70–77
148	September 14	@ White Sox	11–7	Thornton (5–3)	Seay (1–2)		28,238	70–78
149	September 15	@ Rangers	11–8	Francisco (3–5)	Farnsworth (2–3)		13,536	70–79
150	September 16	@ Rangers	5–4	Wright (7–6)	Rodney (0–6)		14,659	70–80
151	September 17	@ Rangers	17–4	García (1–0)	Nippert (3–5)		17,808	71–80
152	September 19	@ Indians	6–5	Perez (4–3)	Dolsi (1–5)		33,733	71–81
153	September 20	@ Indians	6–3	Sowers (4–8)	Verlander (10–17)	Lewis (11)	36,869	71–82
154	September 21	@ Indians	10–5	Lewis (3–0)	Willis (0–2)		36,957	71–83
155	September 22	Royals	6–2	Meche (13–11)	Miner (8–5)		36,428	71–84
156	September 23	Royals	5–0	Greinke (13–10)	García (1–1)		35,121	71–85
157	September 24	Royals	10–4	Bannister (9–16)	Robertson (7–11)		35,899	71–86
158	September 25	Rays	7–5	Galarraga (13–6)	Kazmir (12–8)	Rodney (11)	36,259	72–86
159	September 26	Rays	6–4	Verlander (11–17)	Sonnanstine (13–9)	Rodney (12)	39,617	73–86
160	September 27	Rays	4–3	López (4–1)	Niemann (2–2)	Rodney (13)	40,756	74–86
161	September 28	Rays	8 – 7 (11)	Jackson (14–11)	Lambert (1–2)	Hammel (2)	40,373	74–87
162	September 29	@ White Sox	8–2	Floyd (17–8)	Galarraga (13–7)		35,923	74–88

== Player stats ==
=== Batting ===
Note: Pos. = Position; G = Games played; AB = At bats; H = Hits; Avg. = Batting average; HR = Home runs; RBI = Runs batted in

Player	Pos.	G	AB	H	Avg.	HR	RBI
Dusty Ryan	C	15	44	14	.318	2	7
Magglio Ordóñez	RF	146	561	178	.317	21	103
Plácido Polanco	2B	141	580	178	.307	8	58
Mike Hessman	3B	12	27	8	.296	5	7
Iván Rodríguez *	C	82	302	89	.295	5	32
Miguel Cabrera	1B, 3B	160	616	180	.292	37	127
Carlos Guillén	3B, 1B, LF	113	420	120	.286	10	54
Clete Thomas	LF, CF, RF	40	116	33	.284	1	9
Ramón Santiago	SS, 2B, 3B	58	124	35	.282	4	18
Curtis Granderson	CF	141	553	155	.280	22	66
Édgar Rentería	SS	138	503	136	.270	10	55
Michael Hollimon	2B, SS	11	23	6	.261	1	2
Jeff Larish	DH, 1B, 3B	42	104	27	.260	2	16
Matt Joyce	LF, RF	92	242	61	.252	12	33
Marcus Thames	LF, DH, 1B	103	316	76	.241	25	56
Ryan Raburn	LF, RF, 2B, 3B, CF	92	182	43	.236	4	20
Gary Sheffield	DH, LF	114	418	94	.225	19	57
Brent Clevlen	LF, CF, RF	11	24	5	.208	0	1
Brandon Inge	C, 3B, CF, LF	113	347	71	.205	11	51
Jacque Jones *	LF	24	79	13	.165	1	5
Dane Sardinha	C	17	44	7	.159	0	3
Pitcher totals	—	162	16	0	.000	0	0
Team totals	—	162	5641	1529	.271	200	780

Note: Individual pitchers' batting statistics not included

=== Starting pitchers ===
Player	G	IP	W	L	ERA	SO
Armando Galarraga	30	178 2/3	13	7	3.73	126
Freddy García	3	15	1	1	4.20	12
Jeremy Bonderman	12	71 1/3	3	4	4.29	44
Justin Verlander	33	201	11	17	4.84	163
Eddie Bonine	5	26 2/3	2	1	5.40	9
Kenny Rogers	30	173 2/3	9	13	5.70	82
Nate Robertson	28	168 2/3	7	11	6.35	108
Dontrelle Willis	8	24	0	2	9.38	3

=== Relief pitchers ===
Player	G	IP	W	L	SV	HLD	ERA	SO
Jason Grilli *	9	13 2/3	0	1	0	1	3.29	10
Denny Bautista *	16	19	0	1	0	3	3.32	10
Joel Zumaya	21	23 1/3	0	2	1	5	3.47	22
Aquilino López	48	78 2/3	4	1	0	4	3.55	61
Freddy Dolsi	42	47 2/3	1	5	2	7	3.97	29
Clay Rapada	25	21 1/3	3	0	0	2	4.22	15
Zach Miner (13 starts)	45	118	8	5	0	6	4.27	62
Gary Glover *	18	20 1/3	1	1	0	3	4.43	15
Bobby Seay	60	56 1/3	1	2	0	13	4.47	58
Francis Beltrán	11	13	1	0	0	2	4.85	9
Fernando Rodney	38	40 1/3	0	6	13	5	4.91	49
Todd Jones	45	41 2/3	4	1	18	0	4.97	14
Francisco Cruceta	13	11 2/3	0	3	0	1	5.40	11
Casey Fossum	31	41 1/3	3	1	0	6	5.66	28
Chris Lambert (3 starts)	8	20 2/3	1	2	0	0	5.66	15
Kyle Farnsworth *	16	16	0	1	1	3	6.75	18
Yorman Bazardo	3	3	0	0	0	0	24.00	3
Team Pitching Totals	162	1445	74	88	34	61	4.90	991

* Statistics only include games with Tigers

=== Roster ===
2008 Detroit Tigers
Roster
Pitchers: 52 Denny Bautista; 40 Yorman Bazardo; 53 Francis Beltrán; 38 Jeremy Bonderman; 49 Eddie Bonine; 41 Francisco Cruceta; 32 Freddy Dolsi; 48 Kyle Farnsworth; 49 Casey Fossum; 58 Armando Galarraga; 34 Freddy García; 41 Gary Glover; 49 Jason Grilli; 59 Todd Jones; 40 Chris Lambert; 45 Aquilino López; 31 Zach Miner; 50 Clay Rapada; 29 Nate Robertson; 56 Fernando Rodney; 37 Kenny Rogers; 44 Bobby Seay; 35 Justin Verlander; 21 Dontrelle Willis; 54 Joel Zumaya	Catchers: 15 Brandon Inge; 7 Iván Rodríguez; 52 Dusty Ryan; 57 Dane Sardinha; Infielders: 24 Miguel Cabrera; 9 Carlos Guillén; 26 Mike Hessman; 46 Mike Hollimon; 19 Jeff Larish; 14 Plácido Polanco; 8 Édgar Rentería; 39 Ramón Santiago	Outfielders: 27 Brent Clevlen; 28 Curtis Granderson; 19 Jacque Jones; 20 Matt Joyce; 30 Magglio Ordóñez; 25 Ryan Raburn; 3 Gary Sheffield; 33 Marcus Thames; 36 Clete Thomas	Manager: 10 Jim Leyland; Coaches: 17 Rafael Belliard (infield); 55 Chuck Hernandez (pitching); 51 Jeff Jones (bullpen); 22 Gene Lamont (third base); 12 Lloyd McClendon (hitting); 18 Andy Van Slyke (first base)

== Farm system ==
Level	Team	League	Manager
AAA	Toledo Mud Hens	International League	Larry Parrish
AA	Erie SeaWolves	Eastern League	Tom Brookens
A	Lakeland Flying Tigers	Florida State League	Andy Barkett
A	West Michigan Whitecaps	Midwest League	Joe DePastino
A-Short Season	Oneonta Tigers	New York–Penn League	Ryan Newman
Rookie	GCL Tigers	Gulf Coast League	Basilio Cabrera
