= Sheffield (surname) =

Sheffield is an Anglo-Saxon surname, widespread mainly in the city of Sheffield in South Yorkshire, England (formerly in the West Riding of Yorkshire). The surname Sheffield's meaning is said to be originated from the city in South Yorkshire.

Notable people with the surname include:

- Sheffield Baronets
- Bill Sheffield (1928-2022) American politician, governor of Alaska
- Bryan Sheffield (born 1978), American billionaire businessman, son of Scott
- Carrie Sheffield, American columnist, broadcaster and policy analyst
- Charles Sheffield (1935–2002), physicist and science fiction author
- David Sheffield (born 1948), American comedy writer
- Dan Moody Sheffield (1925–2010), American professional wrestler
- Edward Sheffield (1908–1971), English cricketer
- Emily Sheffield (born 1973), British journalist, former editor of the Evening Standard
- Fred Sheffield (1923–2009), American basketball player
- Gary Sheffield (born 1968), Major League Baseball player
- Gary Sheffield (historian), military historian
- Georgia Sheffield (born 2005), British para swimmer
- Grace Sheffield, fictional character in The Nanny
- J. D. Sheffield (born 1960), American politician
- Jack Sheffield (footballer) (1879–1915), English footballer
- Johnny Sheffield (1931–2010), American former child actor
- Jordan Sheffield (born 1995), American baseball player
- Joseph Earl Sheffield (1793–1882), railroad magnate and philanthropist
- Jeremy Sheffield (born 1966), English actor and former professional ballet dancer
- Justus Sheffield (born 1996), Major League Baseball player
- Karen Sheffield (born 1961), Canadian judo champion
- Kendall Sheffield (born 1996), American football player
- LaTanya Sheffield (born 1963), American hurdler
- Linda Sheffield, American scholar of mathematics education
- Magnus Sheffield (born 2002), American cyclist
- Mary Sheffield (born 1987), American politician
- Ralph Sheffield (born 1955), American politician
- Ricardo Sheffield (born 1966), Mexican politician
- Rob Sheffield (born 1966), American music journalist
- Robert Sheffield (1462–1518), English lawyer and member of parliament
- Ronald Lee Sheffield (born 1946), associate justice of the Arkansas Supreme Court
- Roy Sheffield (1906–1997), English cricketer
- Samantha Sheffield (born 1971), wife of former UK Prime Minister David Cameron
- Scott D. Sheffield (born 1952/53), American businessman
- Skip Sheffield, an early ring name of American professional wrestler Ryan Reeves (born 1981), now better known as Ryback
- Tamie Sheffield (born 1970), American actress and model
- William Paine Sheffield Sr. (1820–1907), U.S. Representative and Senator from Rhode Island
- William Paine Sheffield Jr. (1857–1919), U.S. Representative from Rhode Island
