= Melsheimer =

Melsheimer is a surname. Notable people with the surname include:

- Ernst Melsheimer (1897–1960), German lawyer
- Frederick Valentine Melsheimer (1749–1814), American entomologist and Lutheran clergyman
- Frederick Ernst Melsheimer (1782–1873), American entomologist
- Thomas M. Melsheimer, American lawyer and managing partner of Winston & Strawn LLP's Dallas office

== See also ==
- Melsheimer FM-1, is an American single-seat, high-wing, FAI Open Class glider
