= Sheffield Township =

Sheffield Township may refer to several places:

In Canada

- Sheffield Township, Lennox and Addington County, Ontario (a former township)

In the United States

- Sheffield Township, Tippecanoe County, Indiana
- Sheffield Township, Ashtabula County, Ohio
- Sheffield Township, Lorain County, Ohio
- Sheffield Township, Pennsylvania

See also

- Sheffield (disambiguation)
