= FM1 =

FM1, FM 1 or FM-1 may refer to:

- Bell YFM-1 Airacuda, an American heavy fighter aircraft
- Farm to Market Road 1, a state-maintained highway in Texas
- FM1 (radio station), a radio station in the Philippines
- FM1, a dwarf galaxy in the M81 Group
- Front Mission, a tactical role-playing game
- General Motors FM-1 Wildcat, an American carrier-borne fighter aircraft
- Melsheimer FM-1, an American glider
- Socket FM1, an accelerated processing unit (APU) socket for AMD processors
- Forza Motorsport (2005 video game), a racing game
