= Jesuit College Preparatory School of Dallas =

Location
- 12345 Inwood Road; Dallas, Texas 75244; United States; 32°55′05″N 96°49′07″W

Information
- Other name: Dallas Jesuit
- Former name: Jesuit High School (1942–1969)
- Type: Private, college-preparatory school
- Motto: Men for Others; Ad Majorem Dei Gloriam (For the Greater Glory of God)
- Religious affiliations: Catholic; Jesuit
- Established: 1942; 84 years ago
- Sister school: Ursuline Academy
- President: Michael A. Earsing
- Principal: Thomas E. Garrison
- Teaching staff: 181.0 (FTE) (2019–20)
- Grades: 9–12
- Gender: Male
- Enrollment: 1,119 (2019–20)
- Student to teacher ratio: 6.2 (2019–20)
- Campus size: 34 acres (14 ha; 140,000 m^{2})
- Colors: Blue and gold
- Athletics: 19 sports, 54 teams
- Athletics conference: UIL Region 2 District 7
- Mascot: Rangers
- Accreditation: Southern Association of Colleges and Schools
- Publication: Jesuit Journal (student literary magazine); Jesuit Now (weekly newsletter); Jesuit Today (community magazine); Jesuit Parents' Newsletter
- Newspaper: The Roundup
- Yearbook: The Last Roundup
- Tuition: $26,350 (2025–26)
- Affiliation: Jesuit Schools Network; National Catholic Educational Association
- Website: www.jesuitdallas.org

Jesuit College Preparatory School of Dallas (commonly referred to as Jesuit Dallas or Dallas Jesuit, and formerly known as Jesuit High School) is a private, college-preparatory school for young men under the direction of the Society of Jesus and home to the Jesuit Dallas Museum in Dallas, Texas. While Jesuit operates independently of the Catholic Diocese of Dallas, it exists and serves the Catholic community with the leave of the bishop.

== History ==
=== Timeline ===
Jesuit High School opened on September 14, 1942. Located on the former grounds of Holy Trinity College on 3872 Oak Lawn Avenue in Dallas, Texas, the school had 195 students registered. September 1, 1955, it was the first school in Dallas to integrate, when sophomore Charles Edmond and freshman Arthur Allen, both African-Americans, enrolled.

On August 1, 1963, the school opened its current campus at 12345 Inwood Road. In 1969 Jesuit High School became Jesuit College Preparatory School of Dallas under school president Rev. Paul Schott, S.J. The new name was meant to describe more accurately the school's character and curriculum.

In 1983 the Jesuit Dallas Museum was established with a rather unusual collection for a high school, including Salvador Dalí, Joan Miró, Braque, and Moore.

In 1986 the "Leaders for Dallas" wing of the school added 25% more square footage to the school. It included a lecture hall, computer labs, and departmental offices.

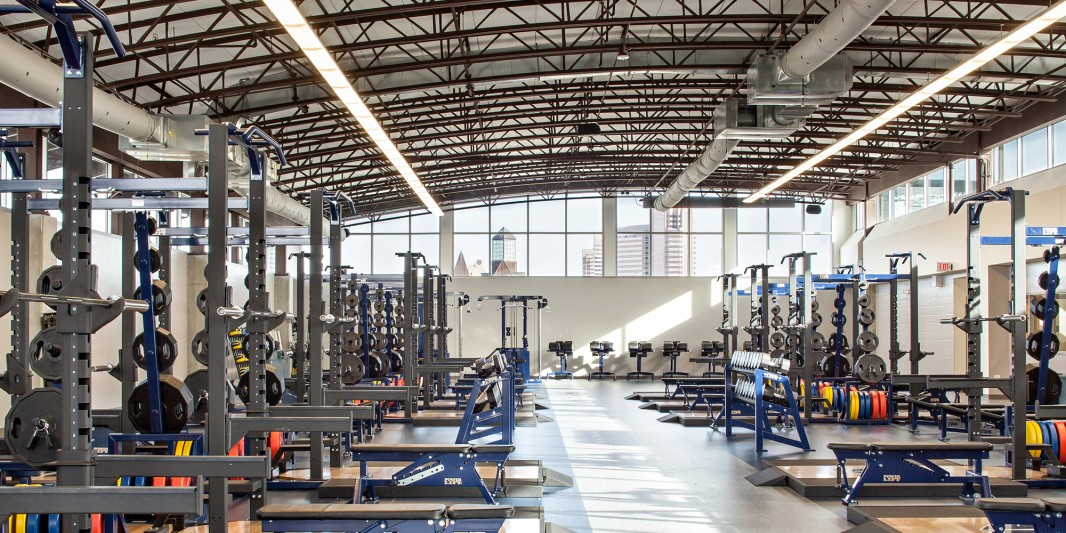
Dell Performance Center

In 2008 the school began the first of a series of major renovations stemming from its $26.5 million "We Are Jesuit" campaign. Many rooms, including the old student commons, were converted into classrooms. The auditorium was also demolished and filled with concrete, amphitheater style seating. Upstairs, new student commons and counselors' offices were built. The Arts, Assembly, and Athletic Building (AAA) was renamed as The Terry Center (or Mike and Mary Terry Family Foundation Center). In 2010, Postell Stadium completed renovation, named in honor of former school President Rev. Phillip Postell, S.J.. The stadium is now called Ranger Stadium, after light was spread on Postell's past actions. The new facilities feature elevated viewing areas, increased spectator seating (over 5000), new concession stands and press box, and upgraded lighting and sound systems. In 2011 the three-story Athletic Tower was completed, creating space to house over 2,500 sqft. of athletic office space and lockers for over 20 sports teams, as well as the 9,000 sqft. Dell Performance Center.

=== Lawsuits ===
In October 2019 a former student sued the school after alleging that the school's former president, Patrick Koch, sexually abused him. Two other lawsuits against the school alleging abuse by Koch where filed in August and September 2019 as well. Koch, who died in 2006, is among those named on the Diocese of Dallas' list of "credibly accused" clergy. In 2022 a lawsuit alleging deceased Fr. Donald Dickerson of sexually assaulting John Doe in 1978 in a religious trip to Mobile Alabama. The president of Jesuit Dallas College Prep asked him to be relieved of his duty, however did not report him to law enforcement authority.

== Campus ==
The 34-acre (14 ha; 140,000 m^{2}) school campus is located on Inwood Road in North Dallas, Texas, adjacent to St. Rita Catholic School, south-west of the intersection of the Dallas North Tollway and Interstate 635 (LBJ Freeway).

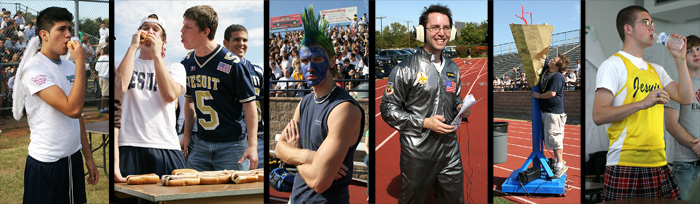
Ranger Day panorama

== Extracurricular activities ==
=== Athletics ===
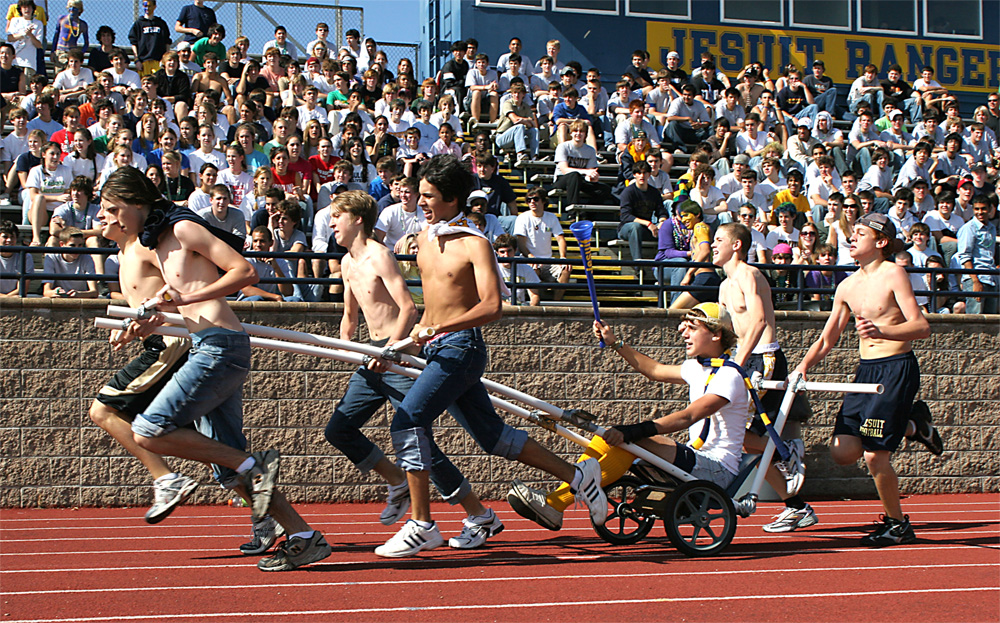
Freshman chariot on Ranger Day

Jesuit in Dallas and Strake Jesuit in Houston are the only private schools in Texas that compete in the University Interscholastic League (UIL), the athletic and extracurricular governing body for the state's public and charter schools. Jesuit currently competes in District 9-6A, the state's largest classification.

Jesuit teams have won 113 team state championships dating back to 1954. Most of the titles were won as members of the Texas Christian Interscholastic League (TCIL), a precursor to the Texas Association of Private and Parochial Schools (TAPPS) of which Jesuit was a member until 2000.

In 2010, the Jesuit Dallas soccer team, which finished the year 25-0-0 and was ranked No. 1 in the nation according to ESPN FAB 50 and the NSCAA, became the first private school team in the history of the state to capture a UIL championship. The historic 2010 team was declared "National Champions" by ESPN FAB 50 after winning 17 of its 25 games against teams ranked Top 50 in the nation according to the FAB 50 poll. Additionally, the team scored 67 goals, conceded 7, and boasted a roster consisting of 10 players that went on to play college soccer (with 8 of them playing NCAA Division 1). Dallas Jesuit won their second soccer state title in 2016–17.

The School also competes in sports outside of the UIL's jurisdiction. Ice hockey has won six state titles (1998, 2008, 2013, 2015, 2019, 2020, 2021, 2022, 2023, 2024) rugby has captured six Texas Rugby Union State Championship (2001, 2010, 2015, 2021, 2023, 2024), and cycling won the Texas High School Cycling League State Road Championships in 2015. Following its third state crown in 2013, Jesuit hockey became the first program in the state of Texas to be invited to the USA Hockey High School National Championships. Since 1996, Jesuit's Lacrosse team has advanced to the state Division I semi-finals 13 times, reached the state championship six times and won titles in 2016, 2017 and 2021.

The 2015–16 academic year proved to be a historic milestone for the Jesuit Dallas athletic program, with the Rangers capturing eight out of a possible 10 UIL 9-6A District Championships. The Ranger tennis doubles team of senior Campbell Frost and Hayden Kissee became the first duo to advance to the UIL 6A State Championship in program history, and the year was punctuated by a pair of state championships. Lacrosse won the first THSLL state championship in program history, 9–4, over Highland Park on May 15, followed by baseball which survived eight elimination games en route to a 6–2 win over Lady Bird Johnson High School in the UIL 6A State Championship game, winning the first UIL state title in team history. Additionally, crew captured second in the Boys Senior 8+ at the Stotesbury Cup Regatta in Philadelphia, Pennsylvania, also securing a berth in the Princess Elizabeth Challenge Cup at the Henley Royal Regatta in Henley-on-Thames, England before being eliminated by eventual runner-up St. Paul's School in heats.

In the 2018–2019 and 2019–2020 seasons, Jesuit's bowling team had a phenomenal run going 20–0 in district play, winning regionals in 2019 and placing second in 2020. With a qualification for state in 2019, the team composed of primarily Juniors placed 26th. In 2020, the team was considered one of the favorites to win the State Championship before it was canceled due to concerns centered around the outbreak of the COVID-19 virus.

=== Debate ===
Debate is one of the oldest and most competitive activities at Jesuit Dallas, and in most decades since the 1940s the school's debaters have reached a top 20 ranking in the country. Dallas Jesuit has won four Texas Forensic Association State Debate Championships since 2000, with back-to-back titles in 2010 and 2011. In addition, Jesuit has finished inside the top 10 at the state championships nine times since 2001.

=== Robotics ===
Jesuit Dallas has offered a competitive robotics program since 2009. Earning the FIRST Rookie All-Star Award in 2009, the team qualified for the National Championships the following year, winning top honors at the VEX Robotics Regional Championships. In 2011 the program won the Dallas Regional Championship and secured a 16th-place finish at the FIRST National Championships. In the summer of 2013, Jesuit's team won the Texas Roundup Off-Season Event and claimed the unofficial Texas state championship. In 2014, Jesuit Dallas was part of the winning alliance at the FIRST World Championship.

== Jesuit Dallas Museum ==
Jesuit Dallas has a gallery and museum with 500 pieces in the visual arts including ceramics, painting, prints, kinetic and stationary sculpture, and featuring artists such as Salvador Dalí and Dale Chihuly, as well as some pieces created especially for the school.

== Administrators ==
=== Presidents ===
Source: Presidents at jesuitdallas.org

- Rev. Nicolas J. Roth, S.J. 1939–1945
- Rev. D. Ross Druhan, S.J. 1945–1951
- Rev. J. A. Sweeney, S.J. 1952–1953
- Rev. Thomas J. Shields, S.J. 1953–1959
- Rev. Robert A. Tynan, S.J. 1959–1965
- Rev. Paul W. Schott, S.J. 1965–1973
- Rev. Thomas J. Naughton, S.J. 1973–1979
- Rev. Patrick H. Koch, S.J. 1979–1980
- Rev. Larion J. Elliot, S.J. 1980–1981
- Rev. Clyde LeBlanc, S.J. 1982–1986
- Rev. Michael Alchediak, S.J. 1987–1992
- Rev. Philip S. Postell, S.J. 1992–2011
- Mr. Michael A. Earsing, 2011–present

=== Principals ===
Source: Principals at jesuitdallas.org

- Rev. Joseph C. Mulhern, S.J. 1942–1945
- Rev. D. Ross Druhan, S.J. 1945–1951
- Rev. Edward P. Curry, S.J. 1951–1954
- Rev. Michael P. Kammer, S.J. 1954–1959
- Rev. Walter C. McCauley, S.J. 1959–1963
- Rev. Albert C. Louapre, S.J. 1963–1970
- Rev. Joseph. B. Leininger, S.J. 1970–1972
- Rev. Patrick H. Koch, S.J. 1972–1979
- Rev. Brian F. Zinnamon, S.J. 1979–1985
- Rev. Geoffrey R. Dillon, S.J. 1985–1993
- Rev. Paul Deutsch, S.J. 1993–1997
- Mr. Michael A. Earsing, 1997–2011
- Mr. Thomas E. Garrison, 2011–present

== Notable alumni ==
Jesuit College Preparatory School of Dallas Notable Alumni
Name	Class Year	Notability	Ref.
J. D. Roberts	1950	former football player and coach, serving as head coach of the New Orleans Saints 1970–1973	
Jerry Pettibone	1958	former football player and coach. Head football coach at Northern Illinois University (1985–1990) and Oregon State University (1991–96)	
L. M. Kit Carson	1959	American actor, screenwriter, director and film producer	
Tom Pauken	1961	American politician and former chairman of the Republican Party of Texas	
John Arnone	1966	Tony Award winning theatrical set designer	
Nic Nicosia	1969	American art photographer	
Tom Bernard	1970	American film distributor specializing in art cinema	
Beau Hill	1971?	record producer best known for work with Alice Cooper, Kix, Winger, Streets, Warrant, Fiona, Europe and Ratt.	
Patrick M. Walsh	1973	former United States Navy four-star admiral, Commander (U.S. Pacific Fleet), Vice Chief of Naval Operations, and Blue Angels pilot	
Timothy Dove	1975	American business executive	
Chris Donahue	1977	film and television producer	
Tom Melsheimer	1979	trial lawyer and managing partner of Winston & Strawn LLP's Dallas office	
Michael McCaul	1980	U.S. Representative, Texas's 10th congressional district	
Rich Hull	1989	American media and entertainment executive, and film and television financier/producer. He is the Founder and CEO of Pongalo, which controls one of the largest libraries of Spanish-language content in the world.	
Trey Ratcliff	1990	American photographer, public speaker, and writer	
Wyatt Cenac	1994	comedian, actor, producer and Emmy Award-winning writer	
Ryan Cabrera	2000	singer-songwriter and musician	
Phil Bolton	2001	rugby union and Rugby Seven's player.	
Kevin Hart	2001	former professional baseball pitcher who played in Major League Baseball (MLB) for the Chicago Cubs and Pittsburgh Pirates.	
Mike Hollimon	2001	former Major League Baseball (MLB) second baseman and shortstop	
Scott Jones	2002	soccer player	
Kenny Cooper	2003	soccer player	
Andrew Combs	2005	singer, songwriter, and guitarist	
Reggie Stephens	2005	football center and guard, formerly with the Cincinnati Bengals, Buffalo Bills, Chicago Bears and Baltimore Ravens	
Chris Udofia	2010	professional basketball player who last played for the Santa Cruz Warriors of the NBA Development League	
Kingsley Bryce	2011	professional soccer player who last played for Chicago Fire in Major League Soccer	
Jordan Spieth	2011	professional golfer on the PGA Tour and former world number one in the Official World Golf Ranking, three-time major champion	
Josh Bell	2011	professional baseball first baseman for the Minnesota Twins.	
Kyle Muller	2016	professional baseball pitcher for the Oakland Athletics	
Jake Palisch	2018	professional baseball pitcher for the Chicago White Sox	
E. J. Smith	2020	college football running back for the Texas A&M Aggies (formerly for Stanford) and son of Pro Football Hall of Famer Emmitt Smith	
Jordan Lawlar	2021	professional baseball shortstop for the Arizona Diamondbacks.	

== See also ==
- List of Jesuit sites
