= Sheffield (disambiguation) =

Sheffield is a city in South Yorkshire, England.

Sheffield may also refer to:

== Academic organisations ==
- University of Sheffield, Sheffield, England
  - Sheffield Academic Press, an academic imprint of the university until 2003
- Sheffield Phoenix Press, an academic imprint based in the UK city specialising in Bible studies
- Sheffield Scientific School, Yale College, U.S.

== Places ==
=== United Kingdom ===
- Sheffield (European Parliament constituency), 1979–1984
- Sheffield (UK Parliament constituency), 1832–1885

=== United States ===
- Sheffield, Alabama
- Sheffield, Illinois
- Sheffield, Iowa
- Sheffield, Massachusetts
- Sheffield, Kansas City, Missouri
- Sheffield, Ohio
  - Sheffield Lake, Ohio
- Sheffield, Pennsylvania
- Sheffield, Texas
- Sheffield, Vermont, a New England town
  - Sheffield (CDP), Vermont, census-designated place in the town
- Sheffield, North Carolina

=== Other countries ===
- Sheffield, Tasmania, Australia
- Sheffield Parish, New Brunswick, Canada
- Sheffield, New Zealand
- Sheffield, Cornwall, England
- City of Sheffield, a district of South Yorkshire, England
- Sheffield Beach, a coastal village in KwaZulu-Natal, South Africa
- Sheffield Manor, Burghfield, England
- Sheffield Park and Garden, a landscape garden in East Sussex, England
  - Sheffield Park railway station

== People ==
- Sheffield (surname), including a list of people with the surname
- Sheffield baronets, a title in the Baronetage of Great Britain

== Sports ==
- Sheffield F.C., an English football club
- Sheffield United F.C., an English football club
- Sheffield Wednesday F.C., an English football club
- Sheffield Eagles, an English rugby league club
- Sheffield RUFC, an English rugby union club
- Sheffield Tigers RUFC, an English rugby union club
- Sheffield Shield, an Australian cricket competition
- Sheffield Steelers, an English ice hockey team
- Sheffield Tigers, an English speedway team

== Other uses ==
- HMS Sheffield, the name of several warships in the Royal Navy
- Sheffield (album), by Scooter, 2000
- "Sheffield" (Walking Britain's Lost Railways), a TV documentary episode
- Sheffield stand, a type of bicycle rack

== See also ==
- Sheffield station (disambiguation)
