= Phil Bolton =

American rugby union

Philip Bolton (born April 5, 1983) is an American rugby union and Rugby Seven's player.

== Early life and education ==
Phil Bolton began his rugby career at Jesuit College Preparatory School of Dallas. After a year playing in Europe, Bolton accepted a rugby scholarship to University of New Mexico in Albuquerque, New Mexico. Bolton was selected as an All American in 2006, 2007.

== Professional career ==
Bolton began his professional career when he joined Clive Rugby Football Club in Hawke's Bay, New Zealand. In 2008 he was part of a Clive team that won the Nash Cup in Napier, New Zealand.
