= E. Glenadine Gibb =

Mathematics education researcher

Elizabeth Glenadine Gibb
- Born: June 8, 1919; Biggsville, Illinois
- Died: 1984 (aged 64–65)
- Occupation: Professor
- Employer: University of Texas in Austin

Academic background
- Education: Western Illinois University (B.Ed); George Peabody College for Teachers (MA); University of Wisconsin (PhD)

Academic work
- Doctoral students: Linda Sheffield

E. Glenadine Gibb was a mathematics education researcher who studied children's thinking about arithmetic operations. She served as the president of National Council of Teachers of Mathematics (NCTM) from 1974 to 1976.

Gibb was the first faculty member of the University of Texas Department of Curriculum and Instruction to be appointed to an endowed professorship, the Catherine Mae Parker Centennial Professorship in Education.
