= Bryan Sheffield =

American businessman

- Born: 1978 (age 47–48)
- Education: Southern Methodist University (2001)
- Occupation: Businessman
- Known for: Founder and CEO of Parsley Energy
- Children: 2
- Parent: Scott D. Sheffield

Bryan Sheffield (born 1978) is an American businessman in the oil and gas industry. He founded Parsley Energy in 2008, which was sold to his father Scott D. Sheffield's company Pioneer Natural Resources in 2021.

Since then, Sheffield has operated a private equity company. Sheffield is a major donor to Donald Trump's presidential campaigns.

== Early life and education ==
Bryan Sheffield is the son of Scott D. Sheffield, chief executive officer (CEO) of Pioneer Natural Resources. In 2001, he received a Bachelor of Business Administration in Finance from Southern Methodist University.

== Career ==
In 2008, Sheffield founded Parsley Energy, taking over 109 old wells that his grandfather Joe Parsley had drilled in the Midland, Texas area. He had no previous experience in the energy business, just "family connections" and a "trader's taste for risk".

gas producer. In May 2014, the company completed an initial public offering on the New York Stock Exchange. The shares rose about 20% on their first day of trading.

In 2017, Parsley purchased oil and gas assets in the Midland Basin from Double Eagle Energy Permian for approximately $2.8 billion in cash and stock.

In March 2017, Forbes estimated his net worth at US$1.3 billion.

In January 2018, Sheffield announced he would resign from his role as CEO of Parsley Energy and become the executive chairman of the company.

In 2020, Parsley acquired Jagged Peak Energy in an all-stock transaction valued at about $1.62 billion.

In October 2020, Pioneer Natural Resources agreed to acquire Parsley in an all-stock deal valued at about $4.5 billion. The acquisition closed in January 2021; including Parsley debt assumed by Pioneer, the deal was valued at approximately $7.6 billion.

=== Formentera Partners ===
After Parsley's sale, Sheffield co-founded Formentera Partners in 2020, a private equity firm that acquires and operates oil and gas assets. In 2021, the firm made its first acquisition, purchasing oil wells in the Texas Panhandle for about $121 million.

Formentera is also active in Australia's Beetaloo Basin through its wholly owned subsidiary Daly Waters Energy. In March 2026, Formentera formed a joint venture with Japanese energy company INPEX to develop natural gas in the basin for the Australian domestic market and LNG export.

== Political Contributions ==
Sheffield donated more than $1 million to Donald Trump's 2024 presidential campaign. After Trump's re-election, Sheffield said he hoped that Trump would not push American oil companies to expand oil production, saying "Our stocks will be absolutely crushed if we start growing our production the way Trump is talking about it."

In 2023, he contributed to Nikki Haley's presidential campaign and to SFA Fund, a super PAC supporting her candidacy. According to a 2024 analysis by Public Citizen, Sheffield and his wife, Sharoll, have also given to Democrats, including $75,000 to Stand Together Austin, a political action committee supporting Austin mayor Kirk Watson, a centrist Democrat, and contributions to Chrysta Castaneda, a Democratic candidate for the Railroad Commission of Texas.

In 2024, Sheffield gave about $47,500 to the Austin Leadership PAC, which also supported Watson's re-election.

== Philanthropy ==
In 2014, Sheffield and his wife, Sharoll, committed to create the Scott Sheffield Energy Investment Lab at SMU's Maguire Energy Institute, named in honor of his father. In 2021, the couple committed $15 million to SMU's Cox School of Business to establish Bryan S. Sheffield Hall, which is the hub of the school's BBA program. SMU gave Sheffield a Cox Outstanding Young Alumni Award in 2016.

== Personal life ==
Sheffield is married, with two children, and lives in Austin, Texas.

In August 2019, Sheffield became a minority owner in Austin FC, a Major League Soccer expansion team based in Austin.

He is on the boards of the Texas Economic Development Corporation and the Greater Austin Crime Commission.
