= Casey Fossum =

American baseball player (born 1978)

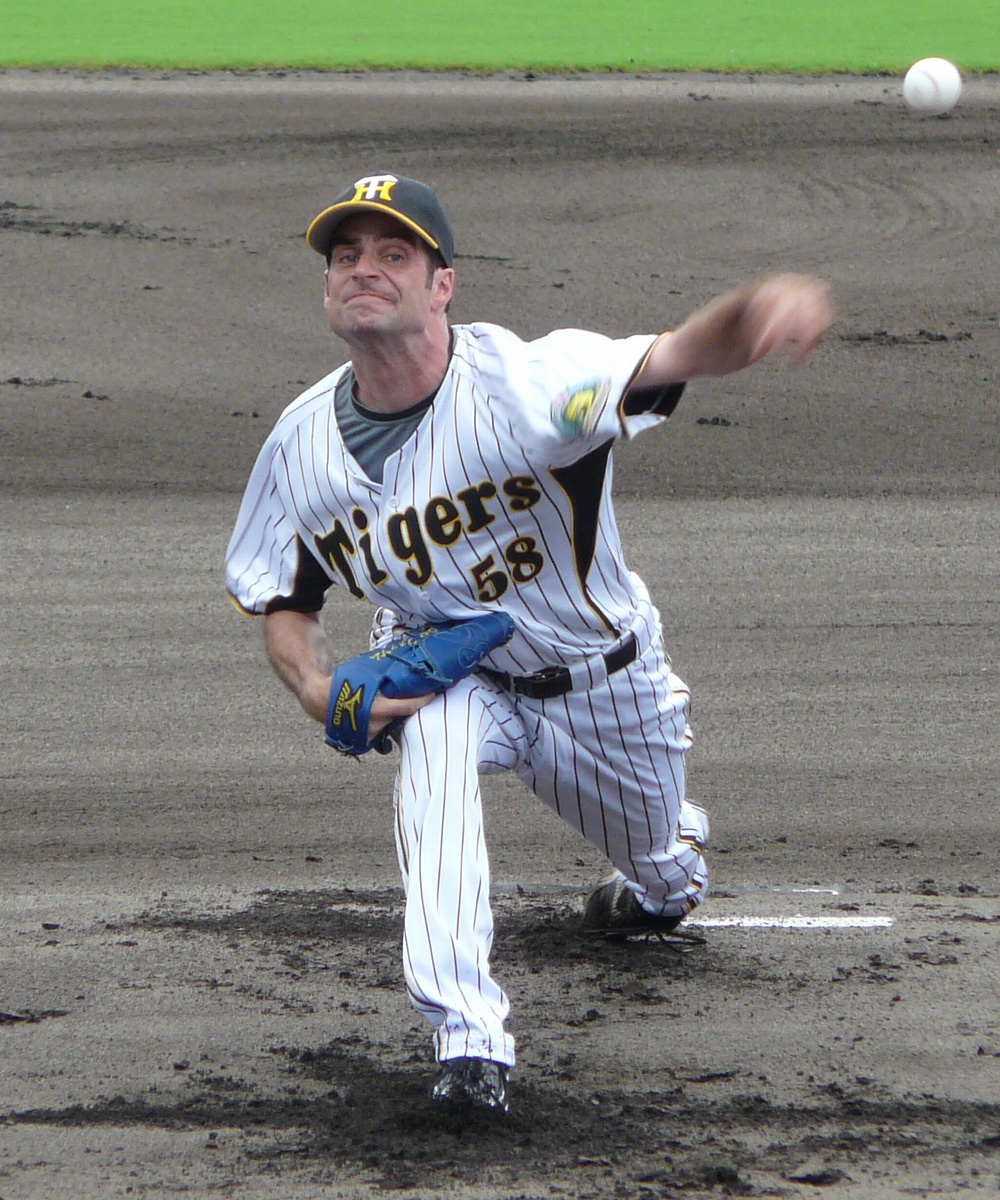
- Fossum with the Hanshin Tigers
- Pitcher
- Born: January 6, 1978 (age 48); Cherry Hill, New Jersey, U.S.
- Batted: Left Threw: Left

Professional debut
- MLB: July 29, 2001, for the Boston Red Sox
- NPB: April 15, 2010, for the Hanshin Tigers

Last appearance
- MLB: April 26, 2009, for the New York Mets
- NPB: July 4, 2010, for the Hanshin Tigers

MLB statistics
- Win–loss record: 40–53
- Earned run average: 5.45
- Strikeouts: 607

NPB statistics
- Win–loss record: 2–5
- Earned run average: 5.72
- Strikeouts: 48
- Stats at Baseball Reference

Teams
- Boston Red Sox (2001–2003); Arizona Diamondbacks (2004); Tampa Bay Devil Rays (2005–2007); Detroit Tigers (2008); New York Mets (2009); Hanshin Tigers (2010)

Casey Paul Fossum (born January 6, 1978) is an American former professional baseball pitcher. He played for the Boston Red Sox (2001–2003), Arizona Diamondbacks (2004), Tampa Bay Devil Rays (2005–2007), Detroit Tigers (2008), and New York Mets (2009) of Major League Baseball and the Hanshin Tigers (2010) of Nippon Professional Baseball.

== Early years and amateur career ==
Fossum was born in Cherry Hill, New Jersey. He attended Midway High School in Waco, Texas, where he was a two time Central Texas Player of the Year, 1st team all state in '95 and '96, Baseball America High School second team All American in '96 with 210 strikeouts in 105 innings.

Fossum then attended Texas A&M University where he was also a Freshman All American and still holds the all-time career strikeout record in a single season and career. He also helped lead the Aggies to the 1999 College World Series in Omaha, Nebraska. He earned All-Big 12 honors in both 1998 and 1999, highlighted by a 12–7 record and 3.64 earned run average (ERA) during his junior campaign, establishing a single-season school mark with 162 strikeouts. Fossum also won the C. E. "Pat" Olsen Outstanding Pitcher Award in 1999 and was a second team All-American in 1998.

== Professional career ==
=== Boston Red Sox (1999–2003) ===
Fossum was selected by the Boston Red Sox in the 1999 June draft as the 18th pick in the first supplemental round (48th overall), and reached the majors in 2001.

During three years with Boston, Fossum moved between the bullpen and the rotation, compiling 14 victories with two saves in 75 games. Both of Fossum's major league saves preserved wins for John Burkett (May 29, 2002 and July 21, 2003). After a recurrence of tendinitis in his pitching shoulder, Fossum underwent surgery in September 2003. Two months after the surgery, he was sent to the Arizona Diamondbacks in the trade that brought Curt Schilling to the Red Sox.

=== Arizona Diamondbacks (2004) ===
In 2004, Fossum played for the Diamondbacks and, for the first time in his career, was used exclusively as a starting pitcher. He missed the first five weeks to recover from surgery, but finished third on the team in starts, innings pitched, and strikeouts.

=== Tampa Bay Devil Rays (2005–2007) ===
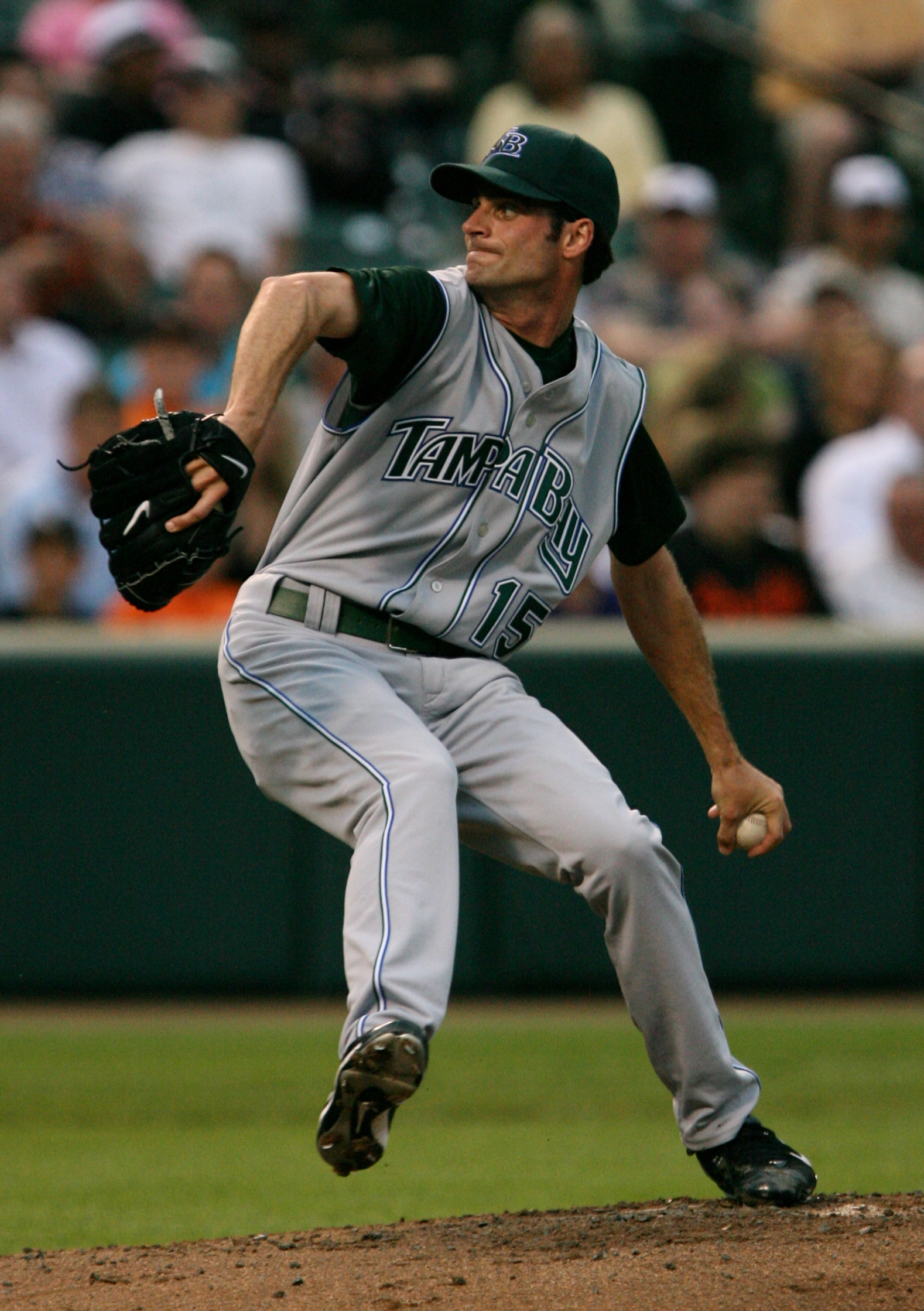
Fossum with the Devil Rays

Before the 2005 season, Fossum was traded to the Tampa Bay Devil Rays for outfielder José Cruz Jr. In 2006, Fossum was 6-6, with a 5.33 ERA in 25 starts.

On August 10, 2007, the Devil Rays released Fossum. At the time of his release, his ERA was 7.70 in 40 games.

=== San Diego Padres (2007) ===
Fossum signed a minor league contract with the San Diego Padres on August 22, 2007 but never pitched for them in the majors.

=== Detroit Tigers ===
On January 24, 2008, Fossum signed a minor-league contract with an invitation to spring training with the Pittsburgh Pirates. At the end of spring training, he declined his assignment to the minors and elected free agency. On April 8, Fossum signed a minor league contract with the Detroit Tigers. On June 3, his contract was purchased by the Tigers, after designating pitcher Francisco Cruceta, and he was added to the active roster. Fossum had a 5.66 ERA in 31 games for the Tigers.

=== New York Mets, New York Yankees, and Chicago Cubs (2009) ===
On January 16, 2009, Fossum signed a minor league contract with the New York Mets. He pitched three innings for the Mets, allowing one run, and was then designated for assignment.

On May 2, Fossum signed a minor league contract with the New York Yankees, making his first start for the Triple-A Scranton/Wilkes-Barre Yankees that day. On June 24, Fossum opted out of his contract and became a free agent.

On July 3, Fossum signed a minor league contract with the Chicago Cubs.

=== Hanshin Tigers (2010) ===
Fossum pitched for the Hansin Tigers of Nippon Professional Baseball in 2010, going 2–5 with a 5.72 ERA in 12 starts.

=== New York Mets (second stint) (2011) ===
On February 9, 2011, Fossum signed a contract with the New York Mets. He pitched in 9 games in Triple-A.

=== Baltimore Orioles (2012) ===
On February 2, 2012, Fossum signed a minor league contract with the Baltimore Orioles. He was released on April 16.

=== Lancaster Barnstormers (2015) ===
On May 19, 2015, after three years out of baseball, Fossum signed with the Lancaster Barnstormers of the Atlantic League of Professional Baseball. In two starts for Lancaster, he had an 0–1 record and 4.91 ERA with 4 strikeouts across 3 2/3 innings pitched. He became a free agent following the season.

== Pitching style ==
Fossum threw three different overhand curveballs. The first curveball was a tight-rotating 1–7 curveball with a velocity in the low to mid 70s, but a pitch that Fossum struggles to throw effectively over the plate for strikes and at times remains too flat. The second curveball was also a 1–7 pitch, has a moderate break while clocking in between 65 and 70 MPH, and he could effectively throw for strikes. The third curveball was a 12–6 curveball with a large break, making it difficult to hit. While the pitch was a very effective pitch for him, often landing for strikes or causing popouts, he regulated the pitch as a change-of-pace pitch to prevent batters from becoming used to it. Fossum dubbed this pitch the "Fossum flip", and it was a form of an eephus pitch. He also had a decent fastball in the 88–92 mph range and a changeup that while effective, did not drop as well as the average changeup. Fossum was also a good fielder and has an above-average pickoff move.

Fossum's biggest knock was his stamina. Weighing in at 160 lbs, Fossum had a somewhat violent throwing style and was injured a few times in his career. In 2004, he missed the first five weeks of the season with a sore elbow, and near the end of the 2005 season his effectiveness was reduced, which he and manager Lou Piniella attributed to lower back pain. For a relief pitcher, Fossum was also very good at holding runners on base. In 2004, baserunners managed to steal 15 bases out of 23 attempts (a 65.2% success rate), and in 2005, only 10 base stealers out of 14 attempts were successful (a 71.4% rate). The league averages in those seasons were 69% and 70% respectively, but relievers tend to allow higher rates than starters.

== Personal life ==
Fossum is married and has three children.
