= Timothy Dove =

- Born: Timothy L. Dove
- Education: Jesuit College Preparatory School of Dallas; Massachusetts Institute of Technology (BS); University of Chicago (MBA)
- Known for: Former CEO of Pioneer Natural Resources

Timothy L. Dove (born 1956/57) is the former chief executive officer of Pioneer Natural Resources.

== Early life and education ==
In 1975, Dove graduated from the Jesuit College Preparatory School of Dallas, where he was the valedictorian.

In 1979, Dove received a bachelor's degree in mechanical engineering from Massachusetts Institute of Technology. In 1981, he received a Master of Business Administration from the University of Chicago.

== Career ==
Early in his career, Dove worked for Diamond Shamrock and Maxus Energy. He then joined Parker & Parsley first as vice president of business development and then as senior vice president.

In 1997, Parker & Parsley merged with MESA Inc. to form Pioneer, which Dove joined as vice president of business development.

In May 2016, Scott D. Sheffield, the CEO and chairman of Pioneer, retired and was succeeded by Dove.

In February 2019, Dove retired.

== Personal life ==
Dove serves on the board of trustees of the Jesuit Dallas Foundation and the MIT Corporate Development Committee. He has previous served on the Dream Dallas Advisory Council for Habitat for Humanity, as trustee for the KidLinks Foundation, as chairman for the Dallas Wildcat Committee, and as president of the Dallas Petroleum Club.

While in graduate school, Dove married Jenny Vilfordi. They have four children, including a son and 3 daughters, all of whom attended Catholic private school in Dallas.
