= Richard Hull (executive) =

American film producer

Richard Hull is an American media and entertainment executive, and film and television financier/producer. He is the Founder and CEO of Pongalo (formerly known as Latin Everywhere), which controls one of the largest libraries of Spanish-language content in the world.

He has led to the creation of and produced more than 25 films and television shows, including She's All That starring Freddie Prinze, Jr. and Rachael Leigh Cook. In 2011, he won the NAACP Image Award for his film For Love of Liberty: The Story of America’s Black Patriots, which he produced with Halle Berry with an introduction by Colin Powell.

In 2000, he and Matthew McConaughey produced The Story of Darrell Royal about legendary University of Texas football coach Darrell Royal. The film featured President George W. Bush, Willie Nelson, Ed Marinaro, Keith Jackson, Mack Brown and Tom Hicks. He contributed an essay to the book Dancing with Digital Natives: Staying in Step with the Generation That's Transforming the Way Business Is Done. The book won the 2012 Axiom Bronze Award in the General Business category and it was a 2011 USA Awards Best Books finalist.

== Personal ==
In July 2014, he married Kelly Straub at the Aspen Valley Polo Club in Aspen, CO. There was a professional polo game after his wedding. He graduated with honors from Vanderbilt University, where he sits on the Alumni Board. He is the co-founder of Vanderbilt in Hollywood, which places current Vanderbilt students into summer entertainment internships in Los Angeles. He grew up in Dallas, Texas and attended high school at Jesuit College Preparatory School. His father, Richard M. Hull Sr, was a prominent attorney in Dallas, TX who was the CEO of President Lyndon Johnson’s LBJ Company in Austin, TX. He had no intentions to get into the entertainment business, but sparked to it when, 20 minutes before curtain, he was given the chance to appear in a theater show after college. He lived in a tent for a summer on an archaeological expedition in Alaska.

== Filmography ==
Producer

| Year | Film | Notes |
|---|---|---|
| 2018 | The Public | Featured Film |
| 2018 | Extracurricular Activities | Featured Film |
| 2017 | Girl Flu | Featured Film |
| 2008 | Tenure | |
| 2007 | On Set, On Edge | TV mini-series |
| 2007 | Daddy Day Camp | |
| 2007 | MTV's Payoff | Short |
| 2007 | Spin | |
| 2004 | He's the Mayor | TV series |
| 2004 | Campus Cops | TV series |
| 2003 | Free For All | TV series |
| 2002 | American Psycho II: All American Girl | Video |
| 2001 | On the Line | |
| 2001 | Get Over It | |
| 1999 | The Story of Darrell Royal | Video documentary |
| 1999 | She's All That | |
| 1998 | Race | |
| 1998 | Jekyll Island | |
| 1997 | Mulligan Men | |
| 1996 | The Spartans | Short |
| 1996 | Within the Lines | |
