= Sheffield station (disambiguation) =

Sheffield station is a railway station and tram stop in Sheffield, England.

Sheffield station may also refer to:

- Bridgehouses railway station (1845–1965), Burngreave, Sheffield
- Sheffield Victoria railway station (1851–1970), Wicker, Sheffield
- Sheffield Wicker railway station or Wicker Goods railway station (1838–1965), Wicker, South Yorkshire
