= Pioneer Natural Resources =

American energy company

Pioneer Natural Resources Company
- Company type: Subsidiary
- Traded as: NYSE: PXD
- Industry: Petroleum industry
- Founded: 1997; 29 years ago
- Defunct: May 3, 2024; 22 months ago
- Fate: Acquired by ExxonMobil
- Headquarters: Irving, Texas, U.S.
- Key people: Richard P. Dealy, President & CEO
- Products: Petroleum; Natural gas; Natural-gas condensate
- Production output: 617 thousand barrels of oil equivalent (3,770,000 GJ) per day (2022)
- Revenue: ▲US$24.294 billion (2022)
- Net income: ▲US$7.845 billion (2022)
- Total assets: ▼US$35.740 billion (2022)
- Total equity: ▼US$22.541 billion (2022)
- Number of employees: 2,213 (December 2023)
- Parent: ExxonMobil
- Website: pxd.com

Pioneer Natural Resources Company, headquartered in Irving, Texas, was a company engaged in hydrocarbon exploration. It operated in the Cline Shale, which is part of the Spraberry Trend of the Permian Basin, where the company was the largest acreage holder. In May 2024, the company was acquired by ExxonMobil.

As of December 31, 2022, the company had 2.376 billion barrels of oil equivalent (1.454×10^{10} GJ) of proved reserves, of which 41% was petroleum, 23% was natural gas liquids, and 28% was natural gas. In 2022, the company produced 649 thousand barrels of oil equivalent (3,970,000 GJ) per day, of which 58% was petroleum, 23% was natural gas liquids, and 19% was natural gas.

== History ==
Pioneer Natural Resources was created in 1997 by the merger of Parker & Parsley Petroleum Company and MESA Inc., owned by Thomas Boone Pickens.

In May 2016, CEO and chairman Scott D. Sheffield was succeeded by Timothy Dove. Sheffield returned to the roles in 2019 after Dove's retirement. In January 2024, Richard P. Dealy was named as CEO.

=== Divestitures and acquisitions ===
| # | Year | Acquisition / Divestiture | Buyer / Seller | Price | Description of Assets | Ref(s). |
|---|---|---|---|---|---|---|
| 1 | May 2004 | Acquisition | Evergreen Resources Inc. | $2.1 billion in cash and stock | Natural gas assets in Colorado | |
| 2 | April 2012 | Acquisition | Carmeuse Industrial Sands | $297 million | Producer of Hickory frac sand | |
| 3 | May 2013 | Divestiture | Sinochem Group | $1.7 billion | 40% interest in approximately 207,000 net acres (84,000 net hectares) leased in horizontal Wolfcamp Shale | |
| 4 | October 2013 | Divestiture | Caelus Energy Alaska | $550 million | Interests in Alaska. In 2002, Pioneer made discoveries in its offshore Oooguruk field, west of Prudhoe Bay, Alaska. In 2008, Pioneer became the first independent operator to produce oil on the Alaska North Slope. | |
| 5 | August 2014 | Divestiture | Linn Energy | $340 million | Non-producing assets in the Hugoton Basin | |
| 6 | June 2015 | Divestiture | Enterprise Products Partners | $2.15 billion | Midstream joint venture with Reliance Industries for assets in the Eagle Ford Group. JV was formed in 2010. | |
| 7 | September 2016 | Acquisition | Devon Energy | $435 million | 28,000 acres in the Midland Basin | |
| 8 | March 2017 | Divestiture | Undisclosed | $266 million | 2,000 acres in Martin County, Texas | |
| 9 | January 2021 | Acquisition | Parsley Energy | $7 billion in stock | Assets in the Permian Basin | |
| 10 | April 2021 | Acquisition | DoublePoint Energy | $6.4 billion in cash and stock | Assets in the Midland Basin | |

=== Acquisition by ExxonMobil ===
In May 2024, in the largest merger in the petroleum industry in 20 years, Pioneer was acquired by ExxonMobil, making ExxonMobil the largest producer of shale gas in the Permian Basin.

Approval for the transaction from the Federal Trade Commission (FTC) was accompanied by a consent decree alleging that former Pioneer CEO Scott D. Sheffield colluded with OPEC to raise oil prices and making the merger conditional on Sheffield's being barred from joining ExxonMobil's board of directors or serving as an advisor to Exxon after the merger.

=== Antitrust lawsuit ===
In January 2024, a class action lawsuit was filed by drivers in three US states accusing Pioneer, along with seven other oil and gas producers, of an illegal price fixing scheme to constrain production of shale oil that led to American drivers paying more for gasoline than they would have in a competitive market. In May 2024, plaintiffs asked for the communications records of former CEO Scott Sheffield. Philanthropy Pioneer Natural Resources operated an extensive philanthropic program focused on education, disaster relief, and community development through various charitable initiatives and partnerships. In 2022, the company contributed nearly $8 million in social investments and employee-led giving to hundreds of charities in the Permian Basin and Dallas-Fort Worth area.
