= Mike Hollimon =

American baseball player (born 1982)

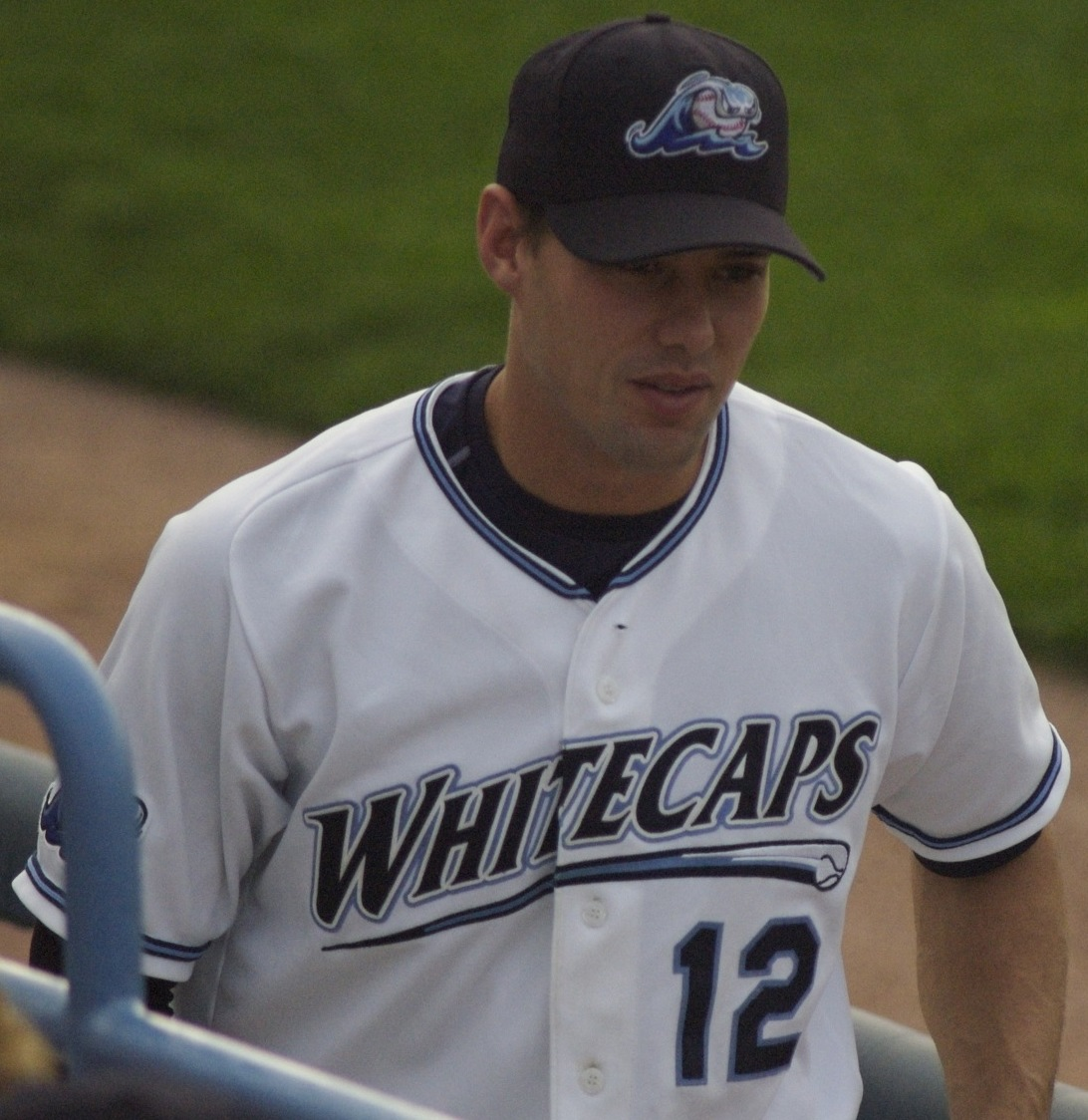
- Hollimon with the West Michigan Whitecaps in 2006
- Shortstop / Second base
- Born: June 14, 1982 (age 43); Dallas, Texas, U.S.
- Batted: Switch Threw: Right

MLB debut
- June 9, 2008, for the Detroit Tigers

Last MLB appearance
- July 6, 2008, for the Detroit Tigers

MLB statistics
- Batting average: .261
- Home runs: 1
- Runs batted in: 2
- Stats at Baseball Reference

Teams
- Detroit Tigers (2008)
Medals
Men's baseball
Representing the United States
Baseball World Cup
Gold medal – first place	2007 Tianmu	Team
World Youth Baseball Championship
Gold medal – first place	1998 Fairview Heights	Team

Michael T. Hollimon (born June 14, 1982) is an American former Major League Baseball (MLB) second baseman and shortstop. After a collegiate baseball career at the University of Texas and Oral Roberts University, Hollimon entered professional baseball with the Detroit Tigers organization in 2005. He played professionally through 2012, including a short stint with the 2008 Tigers, during which he played 11 major-league games.

== Early life ==
Hollimon was born in Dallas in 1982 to Stuart and Jan Hollimon. He attended Jesuit College Preparatory School in Dallas. As a senior in 2001, Hollimon batted .446 and was recognized by Baseball America as a Third–Team All–American.

Before the 2001 MLB draft, Baseball America said that Hollimon might be drafted somewhere between the second and fifth rounds, but they noted that three factors might cause him to enter the University of Texas rather than signing a major-league contract: he had not had an overly impressive senior season; he was being advised by player agent Scott Boras; and he was looking for a $2 million signing bonus. The Los Angeles Dodgers picked Hollimon in the 32nd round, but he attended the University of Texas instead of joining the Dodgers organization.

== College ==
As a freshman, Hollimon hit for a .262 average, with 4 homers and 37 RBI. His average fell to .236 during his sophomore year, and following that season Hollimon batted only .197 while playing for the Wareham Gatemen of the Cape Cod League. The Minnesota Twins picked Hollimon in the 49th round of the 2003 draft, but he chose to stay at Texas. As a junior in 2004, Hollimon saw his average drop to .225. Hollimon saw action in the Texas Collegiate League that summer and earned an all–star designation with his .323 batting average and 7 home runs. Hollimon transferred to Oral Roberts University for his senior season, batting .304 and leading all players in the Mid-Continent Conference with 14 home runs and 55 RBI. He was recognized as conference co–player of the year. Hollimon signed with the Detroit Tigers after being drafted in the 16th round of the 2005 draft.

== Career ==
=== Detroit Tigers ===
In 2005, Hollimon made his professional debut with the Single–A Oneonta Tigers of the New York–Penn League. In 72 games, he posted a batting average of .275, along with 10 triples, 13 home runs, and 53 runs batted in. In July, Hollimon was honored as Detroit's Minor League Player of the Month.

Hollimon moved on to the West Michigan Whitecaps of the Midwest League for the 2006 season. Appearing in 128 games, he batted .278 with 15 homers and 54 RBI. He also tallied 29 doubles, 13 triples, and 19 stolen bases. Hollimon compiled a 10–game hitting streak in June and was named an all–star both during and after the season.

Hollimon spent the majority of the 2007 season with the Double–A Erie SeaWolves of the Eastern League. Across 127 appearances, he batted .282. He hit 14 home runs, drove in 76 runs, stole 17 bases, and hit 34 doubles. On August 31, Hollimon joined the Toledo Mud Hens, Detroit's Triple–A affiliate. He appeared in 5 regular season games with Toledo, and also saw action in three postseason games. Following the season, Hollimon was named an Eastern League all–star and was listed by Baseball America as Detroit's fourth–ranked minor league prospect.

Hollimon began the 2008 season in the International League with Toledo. For the season, he batted only .211 in 91 games with Toledo, hitting 15 homers and driving in 33 runs. He was called up to the Detroit Tigers from the Triple–A Toledo Mud Hens on June 6, 2008, to replace injured shortstop Ramón Santiago. Hollimon made his MLB debut on June 9 against the Cleveland Indians. His first big–league hit, a 5th–inning single off of St. Louis Cardinals pitcher Todd Wellemeyer, came on June 26. During a game played at Safeco Field on July 3, Hollimon hit his first MLB home run against Seattle Mariners pitcher Mark Lowe. Overall, Hollimon batted .261 in 11 games at the major league level, with one homer and two RBI.

Hollimon spent an abbreviated 2009 season at Erie, batting .212, with 3 home runs and 21 RBI, in 29 games. He sustained a right shoulder strain and was placed on the disabled list on June 30. Hollimon had surgery to correct the injury on July 8 and missed the remainder of the season.

On March 6, 2010, Detroit released Hollimon. He spent 2010 with the Grand Prairie AirHogs, a member of an independent league. Hollimon saw action in 55 games, batting .256, hitting 6 home runs, driving in 36 runs, and stealing 10 bases.

=== Minnesota Twins ===
Hollimon signed a contract with the Minnesota Twins on December 18, 2010. He split the 2011 season between the Double-A New Britain Rock Cats and the Triple-A Rochester Red Wings. Hollimon appeared in 97 games for New Britain, batting .223 and tallying 16 homers and 52 RBI. He had a .257 average with Rochester, totaling 2 home runs and 10 RBI over 29 games.

Hollimon appeared in 59 games for Rochester during the 2012 season. He hit 5 homers, drove in 14 runs, and posted a .223 batting average. After the season, he became a free agent.
