= Scott D. Sheffield =

American business executive

- Born: 1952 or 1953 (age 72–73)
- Occupation: Businessman
- Title: President & CEO, Pioneer Natural Resources
- Term: August 1997 - December 2016; February 2019 - December 2023
- Successor: Timothy Dove; Richard Dealy
- Board member of: The Williams Company, Inc.
- Spouse: Kimberley Sheffield
- Children: 5, including Bryan Sheffield

Scott Douglas Sheffield (born 1952) is an American businessman in the oil and gas industry. He is best known as the founder and former chief executive officer (CEO) of Pioneer Natural Resources.

== Early life ==
Sheffield was born in 1952. He spent his high school years in Tehran, Iran, where his father worked as a petroleum executive. Sheffield studied pre-law, later shifting to Petroleum Engineering at the University of Texas. He graduated in 1975.

== Career ==
After graduation, Sheffield began his career as a production and reservoir engineer for Amoco Production Co. He subsequently joined Parker & Parsley as a petroleum engineer in 1979 and was promoted to vice president-engineering in September 1981. In April 1985, he was elected president and director, and on January 19, 1989, he became chairman of the board and CEO.

In August 1997, Pioneer Natural Resources was established through the merger of Parker & Parsley Petroleum Company and MESA Inc, with Sheffield becoming the company's first CEO. He oversaw the company into becoming one of the biggest crude producer in Texas.

Between 2010 and 2014, Sheffield helped Pioneer Natural Resources in raising billions of dollars from investors in India, China, and Wall Street. This capital was used to enhance modern drilling and fracking techniques on Pioneer's Permian Basin land. As a result, the company's oil production more than doubled, reaching approximately 90,000 barrels per day, during a period when U.S. oil production increased by 60% to 8.8 million barrels per day.

In 2015, Scott Sheffield publicly advocated for lifting the U.S. crude export ban during the significant oil price crash that occurred the following year.

At the end of 2016, Timothy Dove replaced Sheffield as CEO. He remained on the board as executive chairman through 2017, and in 2018 moved to non-executive chairman until returning as CEO in 2019.

In February 2019, Sheffield returned to Pioneer as president & CEO upon the retirement of Timothy Dove. Upon his return, he implemented new return of capital framework for the exploration and production industry; reducing capital spending, scaling back drilling plans, and increasing returns to investors through dividends and share buyback schemes. During his tenure, Pioneer acquired Permian producers Parsley Energy—founded by Sheffield’s son, Bryan—and Double Point Energy in 2021, making Pioneer one of the largest oil producers in Texas. Later in 2021, Sheffield stepped down as president but continued as CEO until 2023.

Sheffield retired the end of 2023 with Richard Dealy succeeding him. From January 2024, he remained on Pioneer's board of directors and as special advisor to the CEO until the merger of Pioneer and ExxonMobil in May.

Sheffield is on the advisory board of L1 Energy and the board of directors of The Williams Company, Inc.

Since 2020, Sheffield has ramped up his political contributions to Republican campaigns.

== Collusion allegations ==
During the COVID pandemic, Sheffield petitioned the Texas Railroad Commission to curtail oil production in order to raise oil prices.

In May 2024, during its antitrust review of ExxonMobil's acquisition of Pioneer Natural Resources, the Federal Trade Commission (FTC) alleged that Scott Sheffield had illegally colluded with OPEC and OPEC+, a related cartel of oil-producing countries, to raise oil prices at the expense of U.S. households and businesses. The FTC's complaint cited a quote from Sheffield acknowledging his tactics. Pioneer Natural Resources countered that the FTC misunderstood Sheffield's actions. The FTC reiterated the allegations, citing Sheffield's communications urging production limits. Consequently, the FTC approved the $60 billion merger between Exxon and Pioneer Natural Resources in May 2024 but imposed a settlement condition that barred Scott Sheffield from joining Exxon's board after the merger. In July 2025, the FTC announced that they reopened and reversed the decision barring Sheffield from Exxon's board. He stated he has no interest in joining the board, though he does remain one of Exxon’s largest shareholders.

According to a report by Politico, Sheffield claimed the FTC leaked information about referring the allegations to the Justice Department. His legal team filed paperwork demanding the FTC drop the complaint and rescind the order barring him from Exxon's board.

== Personal life ==
Sheffield is married to Kimberley, they have five children. In retirement, Sheffield lives in Santa Fe, N.M. and spends time on a charity called First Serve-New Mexico.
