= Linda Sheffield =

American mathematics educator

Linda Rae Jensen Sheffield (born 1949) is a retired American scholar of mathematics education, and an expert on gifted education in mathematics. She is a professor emeritus and former Regents Professor of Mathematics Education at Northern Kentucky University, and former president of the School Science and Mathematics Association.

== Education and career ==
Sheffield graduated in 1970 from Iowa State University. She continued her studies at the University of Texas at Austin, where she received a master's degree in education in 1971 and completed her Ph.D. in 1973. Her doctoral dissertation, The Relationships Among Mathematical Creativity, Numerical Aptitude and Mathematical Achievement was supervised by E. Glenadine Gibb.

She was promoted to full professor at Northern Kentucky University in 1983, and named as Regents Professor in 1995. She has since retired as a professor emerita.

== Books ==
As well as primary and middle school mathematics textbooks and teacher guides, Sheffield's books include:

- Developing Mathematically Promising Students (edited, NCTM, 1999)
- Extending the Challenge in Mathematics: Developing Mathematical Promise in K—8 Students (Corwin Press, 2003)
- The Peak in the Middle: Developing Mathematically Gifted Students in the Middle Grades (edited with Mark Saul and Susan Assoulinem NCTM, 2010)
