= Chris Lambert (baseball) =

American baseball player (born 1983)

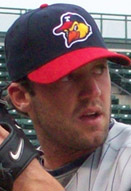
- Lambert with the Toledo Mud Hens in 2009
- Pitcher
- Born: March 8, 1983 (age 43); Burlingame, California, U.S.
- Batted: Right Threw: Right

MLB debut
- August 26, 2008, for the Detroit Tigers

Last MLB appearance
- September 27, 2009, for the Baltimore Orioles

MLB statistics
- Win–loss record: 1–3
- Earned run average: 7.36
- Strikeouts: 26
- Stats at Baseball Reference

Teams
- Detroit Tigers (2008–2009); Baltimore Orioles (2009)

Christopher Raymond Lambert (born March 8, 1983) is an American former professional baseball pitcher. He played in Major League Baseball (MLB) for the Detroit Tigers and Baltimore Orioles.

== High school and college ==
Although born in California, Lambert moved to Manchester, New Hampshire, where he attended Manchester Memorial High School. Lambert initially planned to attend Holderness School, but while playing American Legion baseball the summer out of high school his 90–95 mph fastball attracted attention from college recruiters. With offers from Florida State University, Clemson, LSU and Boston College, Lambert opted for Boston College, praising its "great academic reputation", "very good baseball program" and its closeness to Manchester. Lambert started at BC in early 2002, and immediately made a strong impression, going 9–3 with a 2.76 ERA. The Big East conference named him "Rookie of the Year" and "Pitcher of the Year", while Baseball America granted him "Freshman All-America honors." In the summer of 2002, Lambert pitched for the Concord Quarry Dogs of the New England Collegiate Baseball League, going 3–2 with a 1.55 ERA in nine appearances. Lambert remained strong for the 2002-2003 academic year, posting an 8–2 record with a 2.71 ERA and continuing to receive accolades. After the 2003 season, he played collegiate summer baseball with the Chatham A's of the Cape Cod Baseball League. Lambert returned to Boston College for a third year, going 6–4 with a 3.02 ERA. Impressed, the St. Louis Cardinals selected Lambert as their No. 1 draft pick, 19th pick overall.

== Professional career ==
=== St. Louis Cardinals ===
The Cardinals assigned Lambert to the Single-A Peoria Chiefs in the Midwest League and began playing immediately, posting a 1–1 record with an ERA of 2.38 in nine starts. Promoted to the Single-A Palm Beach Cardinals for the 2005 season he continued to dominate, going 7–1 with a 2.63 ERA in ten starts and earning a quick promotion to the Double-A Springfield Cardinals in the Texas League. The transition to Double-A baseball proved difficult; Lambert went 3–8 with a 6.35 ERA. In an interview, Lambert admitted that he "hadn't pitched that well, yet." A bright spot came at the end of the year when he was named to the United States national baseball team.

Lambert returned to Double-A for the 2006 season and showed improvement, posting a winning record (10–9) and a lowered ERA of 5.30. Lambert made a single appearance at the end of the season with the Triple-A Memphis Redbirds, but was tagged for a loss, giving up three runs in four innings. After stints in spring training and minor league camp to open the 2007 season, Lambert was back in Springfield again. After a strong start, however, the Cardinals promoted him to Memphis, this time for good. However, for the first time, Lambert would be working out of the bullpen: after years in the minors, he was no longer the power pitcher he had been in college. Lambert was philosophical about the change: "I guess that's just the way they thought I'd get to the big leagues. I've had my good innings and bad innings." Lambert would not, however, reach the majors with the Cardinals; on August 30, 2007, he was traded to the Detroit Tigers as the player to be named later to complete the deal which sent pitcher Mike Maroth to the Cardinals. The Tigers assigned Lambert to the Toledo Mud Hens, their Triple-A club.

=== Detroit Tigers ===
Lambert's time as a relief pitcher for Memphis had not been a success: in 28 appearances he was 1–4 with an ERA of 7.49. The Tigers, accordingly, returned Lambert to a starting role. He made one start at the tail end of the 2007 season; a six-inning performance in which he allowed just one hit while striking out ten. The Tigers invited Lambert to 2008 spring training, but he did not make the major league cut and returned to Toledo, where he went 5–3 with an ERA of 3.37 in his first 12 starts. On August 23, the Tigers announced their intention to recall Lambert to start on the 26th in place of the struggling Nate Robertson. Lambert made his first major league debut for the Tigers on August 26, against the Cleveland Indians. He struck out the first batter he faced, Indians outfielder Grady Sizemore, but would end up going 2-1, with an ERA of 5.66 to finish out the year.

Lambert was designated for assignment August 18, 2009.

=== Baltimore Orioles ===
Lambert was claimed off waivers by the Baltimore Orioles on August 20, 2009. He would appear in four major-league games with Baltimore at the end of that season, pitching a total of 5 2/3 innings, all in relief. On October 29, Lambert was removed from the 40-man roster a sent outright to the Triple-A Norfolk Tides. His contract expired following the season, and he did not return to the minor leagues, consequently ending his professional baseball career.
