= Freddy Dolsi =

Dominican baseball player (born 1983)

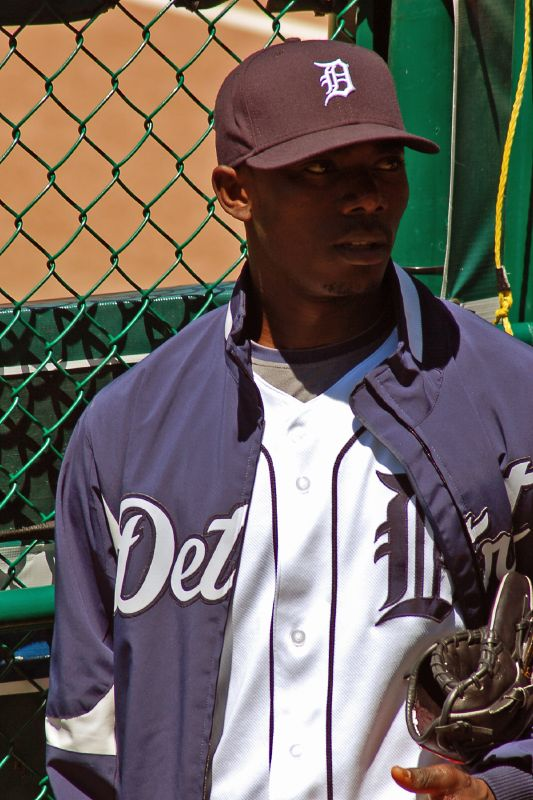
- Dolsi with the Detroit Tigers
- Relief pitcher
- Born: January 6, 1983 (age 43); San Pedro de Macorís, Dominican Republic
- Batted: Right Threw: Right

MLB debut
- May 6, 2008, for the Detroit Tigers

Last MLB appearance
- August 12, 2009, for the Detroit Tigers

MLB statistics
- Win–loss record: 2–5
- Earned run average: 3.55
- Strikeouts: 32
- Stats at Baseball Reference

Teams
- Detroit Tigers (2008–2009)

Freddy Dolsi (born January 6, 1983) is a Dominican former Major League Baseball pitcher.

In May 2008, Dolsi was called up to the Tigers from the Double-A Erie SeaWolves to replace injured Denny Bautista. Dolsi made his major league debut on May 6, 2008, in relief against the Boston Red Sox. His first major league pitch was hit over the center-field fence in Comerica Park for a home run by Manny Ramirez.

Dolsi started the 2009 season with the Triple-A Toledo Mud Hens and has spent most of portions of the season with both the Tigers and the Mud Hens. Then on December 9, 2009, Dolsi was designated for assignment. He was claimed off waivers by the Chicago White Sox on December 18.
