= Francisco Cruceta =

Dominican baseball player (born 1981)

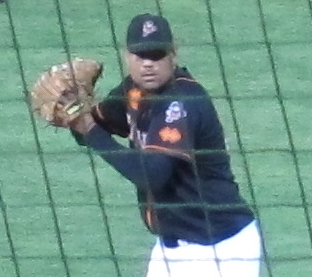
- Cruceta playing for Rimini, Italy, in 2012
- Starting pitcher
- Born: July 4, 1981 (age 45); La Vega, Dominican Republic
- Batted: Right Threw: Right

Professional debut
- MLB: September 21, 2004, for the Cleveland Indians
- KBO: April 7, 2009, for the Samsung Lions

Last appearance
- MLB: June 2, 2008, for the Detroit Tigers
- KBO: October 8, 2010, for the Samsung Lions

MLB statistics
- Win–loss record: 0–4
- Earned run average: 7.96
- Strikeouts: 22

KBO statistics
- Win–loss record: 15–20
- Earned run average: 4.70
- Strikeouts: 205
- Stats at Baseball Reference

Teams
- Cleveland Indians (2004); Seattle Mariners (2006); Detroit Tigers (2008); Samsung Lions (2009–2010)

Francisco Alberto Cruceta (born July 4, 1981) is a Dominican former professional baseball pitcher. He has played in Major League Baseball (MLB) for the Cleveland Indians, Seattle Mariners and Detroit Tigers, in the Korea Baseball Organization (KBO) for the Samsung Lions and in the Mexican Baseball League for the Saraperos de Saltillo.

== Career ==
=== Los Angeles Dodgers ===
Cruceta was signed by the Los Angeles Dodgers as an amateur free agent, on May 20, 1999. He spent the next three seasons with the DSL Dodgers in the Dominican Summer League; in his last year he went 0–4 with 1.50 ERA. For 2002, the Dodgers brought Cruceta over to the Single-A South Georgia Waves, where he went 8–5, with a 2.80 ERA and three complete games. On July 28, 2002, the Dodgers, in the midst of a pennant race, traded Cruceta with Terry Mulholland and Ricardo Rodríguez to the Cleveland Indians for veteran pitcher Paul Shuey. The Indians assigned Cruceta to the Single-A Kinston Indians.

=== Cleveland Indians ===
At Kinston, Cruceta started seven games, going 2–0 with a 2.50 ERA. In November, the Indians added him their 40-man roster, indicating their confidence in him. Nevertheless, Cruceta would not pitch in a major league game for the Indians until the end of the 2004 season. Cruceta began the 2003 season with the Double-A Akron Aeros. At the time, Cruceta had in his arsenal a fastball (which topped out at 94 miles per hour (151 km/h)), slider, and changeup. John Farrell, then the Indians director of player development, praised Cruceta's mechanics: "He throws the ball on a downward plane. It allows the action of all his pitches to work down and force ground-ball outs. We're ecstatic that we got him in the Rodriguez trade." Cruceta enjoyed a strong year at Akron, going 13–9 with a 3.09 ERA. Cruceta returned to the Aeros for the 2004 season, and in mid-June the Indians promoted him to the Triple-A Buffalo Bisons, where he went 6–5 with a 3.25 ERA as the Bisons defeated the Richmond Braves for the International League championship and the Governors' Cup. Following the series Cruceta was one of six Bisons players called up by the Indians for the fall expansion.

Cruceta replaced the injured CC Sabathia in the starting rotation, and made his major league debut against the Detroit Tigers on September 21, 2004. Cruceta gave up five runs in four innings, but did not figure in the decision, as the Indians mounted a comeback and defeated the Tigers 8–7. He pitched in one more game that season, this time giving up four runs on five hits in 3 2/3 innings on September 26, 2004, in a 6–2 loss to the Minnesota Twins, where Cruceta received the loss.

Cruceta returned to Buffalo for the 2005 season, but doubts developed about his role. He struggled as a starter, and attempts to convert him into a relief pitcher met with mixed results. Manager Marty Brown was open in his criticism of Cruceta's efforts to become a reliever, and acknowledged that, when he had Cruceta start a game in mid-August, "You could see he felt more comfortable in that starting role than out of the bullpen. That's a real positive for him." Just a few days after that start, the Indians designated him for assignment. The Seattle Mariners claimed him off waivers and sent him to the Triple-A Tacoma Rainiers.

=== Seattle Mariners ===
Cruceta spent time with the Mariners during 2006 spring training, but opened the year at Tacoma, where he started 28 games and compiled a 13–9 record with an ERA of 4.38 and led the Pacific Coast League (PCL) in strikeouts. In a start against the Colorado Springs Sky Sox in late May, Cruceta pitched eight shutout innings, allowing two hits and no walks while striking out 11. Cruceta continued to pitch strongly, but was passed over for the PCL All-Star team, a decision criticized by the Rainiers' manager, Dave Brundage, who called Cruceta "dominant" and said that he had been "snubbed." The Mariners called Cruceta up in September to make a spot start, but he did not get out of the first inning against the Kansas City Royals, giving up five runs, including a grand slam, in one inning of work. Commented Mariners' manager Mike Hargrove: "It was one of those nights. He'll pitch again. Out of the bullpen." Cruceta made three relief appearances, giving up three runs in five innings of work, but at the end of the year waived him. The Texas Rangers claimed Cruceta and assigned him to the Triple-A Oklahoma RedHawks.

=== Texas Rangers ===
In 2007, Cruceta was suspended for 50 games at the start of the season for violating the minor league ban on steroids. When he returned though, he performed well for the Triple-A Oklahoma RedHawks, going 3–0 in 25 games, with a 3.02 ERA, while striking out 60 batters in 65 2/3 innings. He also pitched well in a winter league stint in the Dominican Winter League for Gigantes del Cibao going 1–1 with a 1.08 ERA. These performances impressed the Detroit Tigers, who signed him on November 30, 2007.

=== Detroit Tigers ===
Cruceta was expected to compete for the vacant spots in the Tigers bullpen during spring training 2008, left by Joel Zumaya and Fernando Rodney after they suffered shoulder injuries. Cruceta's chances of making the Tigers bullpen was dealt a blow when his visa was withheld, allegedly due to his suspension in 2007. After two months of waiting, Cruceta was granted his visa on April 9, allowing for him to come to the U.S. from his native Dominican Republic. After returning to the United States, Cruceta was brought up to the Tigers on April 30, 2008, when Jason Grilli was traded to the Colorado Rockies. Cruceta made 13 appearances for the Tigers, going 0–3 with an ERA of 5.40. On June 3, Cruceta was designated for assignment; after clearing waivers, he joined the Triple-A Toledo Mud Hens. He became a free agent at the end of the season.

=== Foreign career ===
Cruceta signed with the Samsung Lions in the Korea Baseball Organization for the 2009 season. He showed fine performances in his first Korean pro league season, going 9–10 with a 4.36 ERA as a starting pitcher.

In June 2011, Crueta was found cheating again, this time by using an illegal substance on his glove. It was discovered by home plate umpire Stephen Lockhart, who promptly tossed him out.

Francisco Cruceta signed a minor league contract with New York Yankees on June 28, 2011 & was waived thereafter. He spent the 2012 season with Rimini Baseball, in Italy, his last professional stop.

He signed with the Saraperos de Saltillo of the Mexican Baseball League for the 2016 season.
