= Melsheimer FM-1 =

1968 American glider

FM-1
- The FM-1 in its original prototype configuration with the T-tail

General information
- Type: Glider
- National origin: United States
- Designer: Frank Melsheimer
- Status: Production completed
- Number built: One

History
- Introduction date: 1968
- First flight: 1968

The Melsheimer FM-1 is an American single-seat, high-wing, FAI Open Class glider that was designed and constructed by Frank Melsheimer.

== Design and development ==
The FM-1 was first flown in 1968. The designation indicates the designer's initials.

The FM-1 features mixed construction. The aft fuselage and wings are constructed from wood, with the forward fuselage made from welded steel tubing, covered in fibreglass. The wing employs a NACA 4400R airfoil. The aircraft was originally constructed with a T-tail, but this was later changed to a conventional low tail. The cockpit accommodation is one seat in a semi-reclining position.

Only one example was completed and registered in the Experimental - Amateur-built category.

== Operational history ==
As of May 2011 the FM-1 was still on the Federal Aviation Administration registry.

== Specifications (FM-1) ==
Data from Sailplane Directory and Soaring

General characteristics

- Crew: one
- Wingspan: 51 ft 0 in (15.54 m)
- Wing area: 125 sq ft (11.6 m^{2})
- Aspect ratio: 21:1
- Airfoil: NACA 4400R
- Empty weight: 500 lb (227 kg)
- Gross weight: 750 lb (340 kg)

Performance

- Maximum glide ratio: Estimated 35:1 at 60 mph (97 km/h)
- Rate of sink: 108 ft/min (0.55 m/s) at 40 mph (64 km/h)
- Wing loading: 6.0 lb/sq ft (29 kg/m^{2})

== See also ==
Related lists

- List of gliders
