= Thomas M. Melsheimer =

American lawyer (born 1961)

Thomas Melsheimer
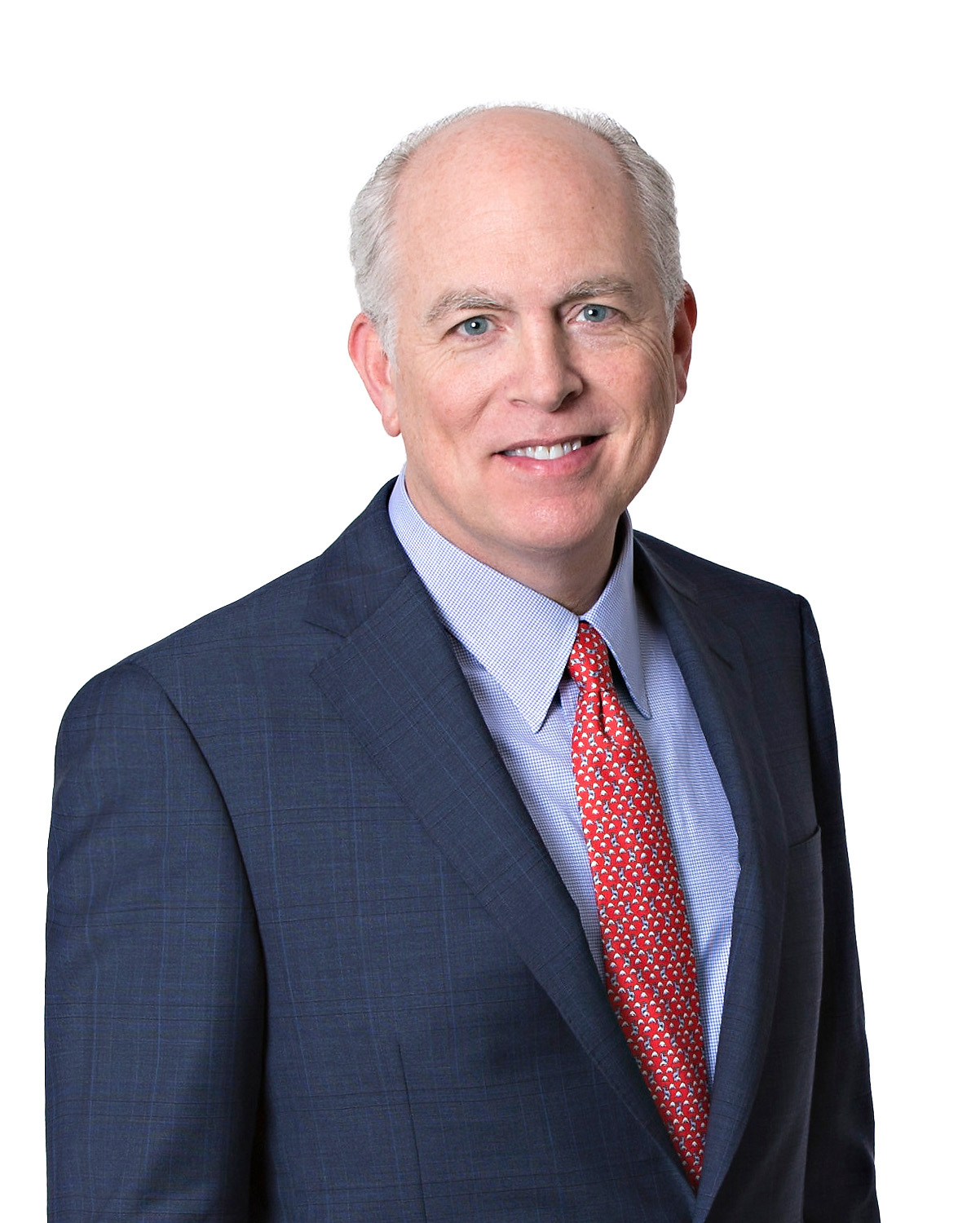
- Born: Thomas Matthias Melsheimer; 1961 (age 64–65)
- Education: University of Notre Dame University of Texas School of Law
- Employer: King & Spalding
- Website: Lawyer profile

Thomas M. Melsheimer is a trial lawyer at King & Spalding. He is also managing partner of King & Spalding's Dallas office and global head of trial work. His trial experience encompasses civil and criminal litigation, including False Claims Act (FCA) violations. His clients have included Mark Cuban, Microsoft, Bank of America, and Texas Instruments. He was on law review, and afterwards was a law clerk in a United States District Court. He is a fellow in The American College of Trial Lawyers, member of the International Academy of Trial Lawyers, and a member of the American Board of Trial Advocates.

== Early life and education ==
Melsheimer graduated magna cum laude from the University of Notre Dame in 1983. He later attended The University of Texas School of Law in Austin, also graduating magna cum laude in 1986. There, he served as a member of the Texas Law Review and, following law school, Melsheimer served as a law clerk for Homer Thornberry at the U.S. Court of Appeals for the Fifth Circuit.

== Professional career ==
In 1987, Melsheimer joined Akin Gump Strauss Hauer & Feld as an Associate in the Litigation Section. In 1990, he became an Assistant U.S. Attorney for the Northern District of Texas.

In 1993, he co-founded a Dallas litigation boutique law firm. In 2000, he opened the Dallas office of Fish & Richardson, a global intellectual property law firm. In 2017, he helped open the Dallas office of Winston & Strawn.

He is a fellow in The American College of Trial Lawyers, and the International Academy of Trial Lawyers, and is a member of the American Board of Trial Advocates.

As of 2026, Melshaimer serves as a trial lawyer at King & Spalding in Dallas.

== Notable cases ==
=== Ramirez v. Exxon Mobil Corp. ===
In 2026, Melsheimer defended ExxonMobil Corp. in a 10-year old securities class action lawsuit about the company's executive who allegedly lied or pressured subordinates to mislead investors. The company was cleared of any wrongdoing.

=== Ruel Hamilton case ===
In 2025, Melsheimer represented the Dallas developer Ruel Hamilton during his retrial concerning a 2021 verdict that found Hamilton guilty of bribing members of the Dallas City Council. The retrial ended with Hamilton being acquitted of all charges.

=== United States v. DaVita, Inc and Kent Thiry ===
In 2022, Melsheimer represented Kent Thiry, the former CEO of the health care giant, DaVita, Inc, in the defense under Section 1 of the Sherman Act. After an 8 day jury trial in federal court in Denver, the jury acquitted Melsheimer's client.

=== Texas Heart Hospital of the Southwest Litigation ===
In 2020, Melsheimer was counsel for whistleblowers Mitchell Magee and Todd Dewey in a qui tam Medicare fraud case filed in the Eastern District of Texas, alleging that Texas Heart Hospital of the Southwest LLP and others violated federal statutes. The case resulted in a $48 million settlement and fees.

=== Forest Park case ===
In 2019, Melsheimer represented Nick Nicholson, a bariatric surgeon, in an indictment alleging a massive conspiracy to pay and receive $40 million in health care kickbacks. After a seven-week trial in federal court in Dallas with the nine remaining defendants, Nicholson was acquitted.

=== Securities and Exchange Commission v. Mark Cuban ===
In 2013, Melsheimer served as lead trial counsel in the successful defense of Texas billionaire Mark Cuban in an insider trading. The three-week trial concluded on October 16, 2013, when jurors issued a verdict finding Cuban not guilty.

=== IRCC v. NL Industries ===
Melsheimer’s $178 million jury trial win on behalf of the plaintiff in IRCC v. NL Industries, et al., included nearly $150 million in punitive damages. The jury award in the breach of fiduciary duty case was named one of the Top Verdicts of 2009 by The National Law Journal.

== Publications ==
Melsheimer's written work includes the following:

- Thomas M. Melsheimer & Judge Craig Smith, On the Jury Trial: Principles and Practices of Effective Advocacy, University of North Texas Press, October 2017. The book received a review from Judge Alan Albright.
- Stephen D. Susman & Thomas M. Melsheimer, "Trial By Agreement: A Professional Approach Improves Results and Saves the Jury System", Texas Bar Journal, October 2015.
- "A Response to 'The Collapse of the Jury Trial'", The Jury Expert: The Art and Science of Litigation Advocacy, August 28, 2015.
- Mark Cuban & Thomas M. Melsheimer, "It is time to rein in the SEC", The Washington Post, December 19, 2014.
- Stephen D. Susman & Thomas M. Melsheimer, Trial by Agreement: How Trial Lawyers Hold the Key to Improving Jury Trials in Civil Cases, 32 REV. LITIG. 431 (2013).
- "Tom Melsheimer and Craig Smith: Scouts' tentative decision fails leadership challenge", The Dallas Morning News, April 25, 2013.
- "Privacy laws evolving in new era of technology", Houston Chronicle, March 23, 2012.
- "Trial's Over, But Issues Remain", Preston Hollow People newspaper, October 7, 2011.
- "Businesses' Fear of U.S. Jury System Is Irrational", Houston Chronicle, July 30, 2011.
- "Guest Column: Why 'Loser Pays' is a Loser", The Dallas Morning News, May 13, 2011.
- "Melsheimer and Smith: Hybrid bill offers best blueprint for Texas judicial selection", The Dallas Morning News, March 14, 2011.
- "Thomas Melsheimer: Pope's first step to restoring my faith", The Dallas Morning News, May 14, 2010.
- "Smith and Melsheimer: We’re all better for Merrill Hartman", The Dallas Morning News, October 25, 2010.
- "Trashing Supreme Court not appropriate for Obama", Houston Chronicle, March 2, 2010.
- "Web-savvy Jurors Create New Problem for Courts", Houston Chronicle, June 21, 2009.
- "Melsheimer and Smith: One crime but not the other?" The Dallas Morning News, December 5, 2008.
