= 2009 Boston Red Sox season =

Major League Baseball season

2009 Boston Red Sox
- American League Wild Card winners
- League: American League
- Division: East
- Ballpark: Fenway Park
- City: Boston, Massachusetts
- Record: 95–67 (.586)
- Divisional place: 2nd
- Owners: John W. Henry (New England Sports Ventures)
- President: Larry Lucchino
- General manager: Theo Epstein
- Manager: Terry Francona
- Television: New England Sports Network (Don Orsillo, Jerry Remy, Dennis Eckersley, Dave Roberts, Buck Martinez, Tony Massarotti, Rance Mulliniks, Rex Hudler, Ron Coomer, Ken Rosenthal, Kevin Kennedy, Dwight Evans, Sean Casey, Jim Kaat, Gordon Edes, Bob Montgomery, Frank Viola, Sean McAdam, Brian Daubach, Rick Dempsey)
- Radio: WRKO/WEEI (English) (Joe Castiglione, Dave O'Brien, Jon Rish, Dale Arnold)
- Stats: ESPN.com; Baseball Reference

The 2009 Boston Red Sox season was the 109th season in the franchise's Major League Baseball history. The Red Sox finished second in the American League East with a record of 95–67, eight games behind the New York Yankees, who went on to win the 2009 World Series. The Red Sox qualified for the postseason as the AL wild card but were swept by the American League West champion Los Angeles Angels of Anaheim in the ALDS.

== Roster ==
2009 Boston Red Sox
Roster
Pitchers: 60 Daniel Bard; 19 Josh Beckett; 64 Michael Bowden; 61 Clay Buchholz; 36 Paul Byrd; 53 Fernando Cabrera; 17 Manny Delcarmen; 51 Enrique González; 62 Hunter Jones; 31 Jon Lester; 48 Javier López; 63 Justin Masterson; 18 Daisuke Matsuzaka; 37 Hideki Okajima; 58 Jonathan Papelbon; 36 Brad Penny; 56 Ramón Ramírez; 54 Dustin Richardson; 24 Takashi Saito; 29 John Smoltz; 63 Junichi Tazawa; 40 Billy Traber; 13 Billy Wagner; 49 Tim Wakefield	Catchers: 50 Dusty Brown; 16 George Kottaras; 41 Víctor Martínez; 33 Jason Varitek; Infielders: 55 Jeff Bailey; 50 Aaron Bates; 13,3 Álex González; 22 Nick Green; 11 Casey Kotchman; 11 Mark Kotsay; 23 Adam LaRoche; 25 Mike Lowell; 12 Jed Lowrie; 23 Julio Lugo; 15 Dustin Pedroia; 51 Gil Velazquez; 30 Chris Woodward; 20 Kevin Youkilis	Outfielders: 32 Brian Anderson; 5 Rocco Baldelli; 44 Jason Bay; 54 Chris Carter; 7 J. D. Drew; 46 Jacoby Ellsbury; 23 Joey Gathright; 68 Josh Reddick; 30 Jonathan Van Every; Other batters: 34 David Ortiz	Manager: 47 Terry Francona; Coaches: 10 Tim Bogar (first base); 52 John Farrell (pitching); 35 DeMarlo Hale (third base); 29 Dave Magadan (hitting); 2 Brad Mills (bench); 57 Gary Tuck (bullpen)

== Regular season ==
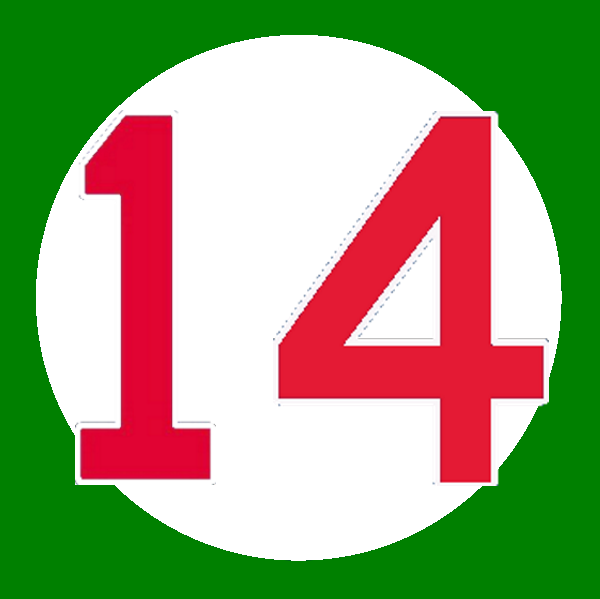
Jim Rice's number 14 was retired by the Boston Red Sox in 2009.

The team introduced blue alternate jerseys, worn on some road games in place of their traditional gray tops.

The Red Sox opened the season with a postponement due to rain. However, on April 7, the season began at Fenway with the first pitch being thrown by Edward Kennedy, who later died in August. The Red Sox got off to a slow start, going 2–6 in the first eight games. However, the Sox won 11 straight games beginning on April 15. The win streak was Boston's longest since 2006 when they had a 12-game win streak. A highlight of the streak was Jacoby Ellsbury's steal of home on April 26 to cap off a three-game sweep of the New York Yankees. They finished April with a record of 14–8 and tied with the Toronto Blue Jays for the division lead. Also, Jerry Remy, NESN color commentator, had surgery to remove a small area of cancer on his lung. While recovering he also got pneumonia. He also was suffering from fatigue and depression. These are the people who filled in for him: Dennis Eckersley, Dave Roberts, Buck Martinez, Tony Massarotti, Rance Mulliniks, Rex Hudler, Ron Coomer, Ken Rosenthal, Kevin Kennedy, Dwight Evans, Sean Casey, Jim Kaat, Gordon Edes, Bob Montgomery, Frank Viola, Sean McAdam, Brian Daubach, and Rick Dempsey.

The team flattened out in May, going 15–14 in the month and falling to third in the division behind the Yankees and the Blue Jays. Through the first two months of the season, slugger David Ortiz struggled, batting .185 with one home run. Additionally, pitcher Daisuke Matsuzaka was placed on the disabled list after just two starts with an injury that manager Terry Francona attributed to his participation in the 2009 World Baseball Classic. Off the field, announcer Jerry Remy, of NESN television, was replaced by Dennis Eckersley beginning on May 6 as Remy began undergoing cancer treatment. Despite these struggles, the Red Sox set an American League record, tying the Major League record, on May 7 by scoring 12 runs without recording an out during the 6th inning of a game against the Cleveland Indians.

The Red Sox took the division lead, and improved to the second-best record in MLB, during June. Through the first half of the month, the Sox played four division leaders, the Detroit Tigers, Texas Rangers, New York Yankees, and Philadelphia Phillies, winning three of the four series and sweeping both the Tigers and Yankees. By sweeping the Yankees, the Sox improved to 8–0 against the team, the best record against them since sweeping the 14-game season series against them in 1912. At the All-Star break, the Red Sox had the second best record in Major League Baseball and held a three-game lead in the division.

The Red Sox faltered after the All-Star break, losing five of six on the road to the Toronto Blue Jays and Texas Rangers and batting .192 and scoring 13 runs. In response to the poor offensive performance and to make room for Jed Lowrie's return from injury, Julio Lugo was traded to the St. Louis Cardinals for cash and two minor-league players were traded to the Pittsburgh Pirates for Adam LaRoche on July 22, and on July 25, Mark Kotsay was designated for assignment. The Red Sox made a move at the trade deadline, July 31, to acquire catcher Victor Martinez from the Cleveland Indians for pitchers Justin Masterson, Nick Hagadone, and Bryan Price. They also traded Adam LaRoche to the Atlanta Braves for Casey Kotchman. After winning the first eight games of the season against their rival Yankees in the first half of the season, the Red Sox lost nine of the next ten to finish the season 9–9 against them.

One of the stranger victories for the Sox came on August 14 against the Texas Rangers. Going into the top of the 9th inning, the home Rangers were leading 4–2. Jacoby Ellsbury drove in David Ortiz to pull within one run and Jason Varitek was left on second base with no outs. Pitcher Clay Buchholz came in to pinch run for Varitek with no outs. Dustin Pedroia doubled, but the inexperienced, and potentially tying run, Buchholz, was thrown out at the plate as he hesitated between second and third before attempting to score. All was shortly forgotten when the team scored five more runs to win 8–4. On August 21, Jacoby Ellsbury tied the record for the Red Sox single season record for stolen bases (54), in a game against the New York Yankees, a record previously held by Tommy Harper. Ellsbury then broke the record with his 55th steal on August 25, against the Chicago White Sox.

=== Opening Day lineup ===
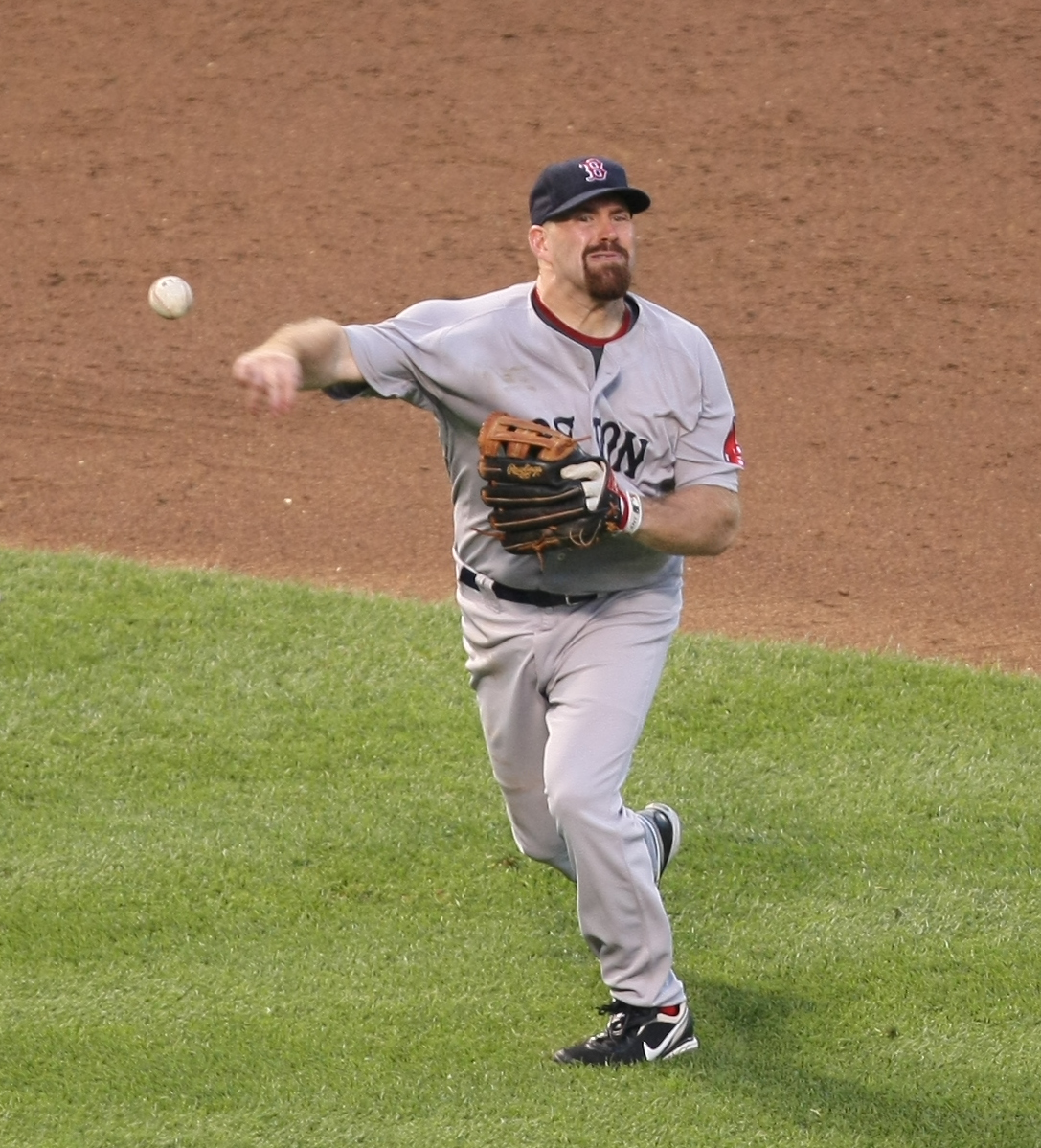
Gold Glove first baseman Kevin Youkilis

46	Jacoby Ellsbury	CF
15	Dustin Pedroia	2B
34	David Ortiz	DH
20	Kevin Youkilis	1B
7	J. D. Drew	RF
44	Jason Bay	LF
25	Mike Lowell	3B
12	Jed Lowrie	SS
33	Jason Varitek	C
19	Josh Beckett	P

=== Season standings ===
AL East
Team	W	L	Pct.	GB	Home	Road
New York Yankees	103	59	.636	—	57‍–‍24	46‍–‍35
Boston Red Sox	95	67	.586	8	56‍–‍25	39‍–‍42
Tampa Bay Rays	84	78	.519	19	52‍–‍29	32‍–‍49
Toronto Blue Jays	75	87	.463	28	44‍–‍37	31‍–‍50
Baltimore Orioles	64	98	.395	39	39‍–‍42	25‍–‍56

AL Wild Card	W	L	Pct.	GB	Strk.	E#
Boston Red Sox	95	67	.586	—	W4	—
Texas Rangers	87	75	.537	8	L2	E

=== Record vs. opponents ===
2009 American League record Source: MLB Standings Grid – 2009
Team	BAL	BOS	CWS	CLE	DET	KC	LAA	MIN	NYY	OAK	SEA	TB	TEX	TOR	NL
Baltimore	–	2–16	5–4	2–5	3–5	4–4	2–8	3–2	5–13	1–5	4–5	8–10	5–5	9–9	11–7
Boston	16–2	–	4–4	7–2	6–1	5–3	4–5	4–2	9–9	5–5	2–4	9–9	2–7	11–7	11–7
Chicago	4–5	4−4	–	10–8	9–9	9–9	5–4	6−12	3–4	4–5	4–5	6–2	2–4	1–6	12–6
Cleveland	5–2	2–7	8–10	–	4–14	10–8	2–4	8–10	3–5	2–5	6–4	5–3	1–8	4–4	5–13
Detroit	5–3	1–6	9–9	14–4	–	9–9	5–4	7–12	1–5	5–4	5–4	5–2	7–2	3–5	10–8
Kansas City	4–4	3–5	9–9	8–10	9–9	–	1–9	6–12	2–4	2–6	5–4	1–9	3–3	4–3	8–10
Los Angeles	8–2	5–4	4–5	4–2	4–5	9–1	–	6–4	5–5	12–7	10–9	4–2	8–11	4–4	14–4
Minnesota	2–3	2–4	12–6	10–8	12–7	12–6	4–6	–	0–7	4–6	5–5	3–3	6–4	3–5	12–6
New York	13–5	9–9	4–3	5–3	5–1	4–2	5–5	7–0	–	7–2	6–4	11–7	5–4	12–6	10–8
Oakland	5–1	5–5	5–4	5–2	4–5	6–2	7–12	6–4	2–7	–	5–14	6–4	11–8	3–6	5–13
Seattle	5–4	4–2	5–4	4–6	4–5	4–5	9–10	5–5	4–6	14–5	–	5–3	8–11	3–4	11–7
Tampa Bay	10–8	9–9	2–6	3–5	2–5	9–1	2–4	3–3	7–11	4–6	3–5	–	3–6	14–4	13–5
Texas	5–5	7–2	4–2	8–1	2–7	3–3	11–8	4–6	4–5	8–11	11–8	6–3	–	5–5	9–9
Toronto	9–9	7–11	6–1	4–4	5–3	3–4	4–4	5–3	6–12	6–3	4–3	4–14	5–5	–	7–11

- Source: MLB Standings Grid – 2009

Red Sox vs. National League East
Team	ATL	FLA	NYM	PHI	WSH
Boston	4–2	2–1	1–2	2–1	2–1

=== Notable transactions ===
- November 19, 2008: Ramón Ramírez was acquired by the Red Sox from the Royals in exchange for Coco Crisp.
- December 28, 2008: Brad Penny signed as a free agent with the Red Sox.
- January 5, 2009: Nick Green signed as a free agent with the Red Sox.
- January 8, 2009: Rocco Baldelli signed as a free agent with the Red Sox.
- January 9, 2009: Mark Kotsay signed as a free agent with the Red Sox.
- January 10, 2009: Takashi Saito signed as a free agent with the Red Sox.
- January 12, 2009: John Smoltz signed as a free agent with the Red Sox.
- July 8, 2009: Jonathan Van Every was released by the Red Sox.
- July 22, 2009: Adam LaRoche was acquired by the Red Sox from the Pirates in exchange for Argenis Díaz and Hunter Strickland. In a separate trade, Chris Duncan was acquired by the Red Sox from the St. Louis Cardinals in exchange for Julio Lugo.
- July 28, 2009: Brian Anderson was acquired by the Red Sox from the Chicago White Sox in exchange for Mark Kotsay.
- July 31, 2009: Casey Kotchman was acquired by the Red Sox from the Braves in exchange for Adam LaRoche. In a separate trade, Víctor Martínez was acquired by the Red Sox from the Indians in exchange for Nick Hagadone, Justin Masterson, and Bryan Price.
- August 5, 2009: Paul Byrd signed as a free agent with the Red Sox.
- August 7, 2009: Chris Woodward was selected off waivers by the Red Sox from the Mariners.
- August 14, 2009: Álex González was acquired by the Red Sox from the Reds in exchange for Kristopher Negrón.
- August 17, 2009: John Smoltz was released by the Red Sox.
- August 21, 2009: Chris Duncan was released by the Red Sox.
- August 25, 2009: Billy Wagner was acquired by the Red Sox from the Mets in exchange players to be named later.
- August 27, 2009: Brad Penny was released by the Red Sox.
- August 29, 2009: Joey Gathright was purchased by the Red Sox from the Orioles.

=== Detailed record ===
Team	Home	Away	Total	Pct.	Gms Left
AL East
Baltimore Orioles	8–1	8–1	16–2	0.889	–
New York Yankees	7–2	2–7	9–9	0.500	–
Tampa Bay Rays	6–3	3–6	9–9	0.500	–
Toronto Blue Jays	6–3	5–4	11–7	0.611	–
	26–9	18–18	44–27	0.620	–
AL Central
Chicago White Sox	3–1	1–3	4–4	0.500	–
Cleveland Indians	5–1	2–1	7–2	0.750	–
Detroit Tigers	3–1	3–0	6–1	0.857	–
Kansas City Royals	3–1	2–2	5–3	0.625	–
Minnesota Twins	2–0	2–2	4–2	0.667	–
	16–4	10–8	26–12	0.684	–
AL West
Los Angeles Angels	2–1	2–4	4–5	0.444	–
Oakland Athletics	4–3	1–2	5–5	0.500	–
Seattle Mariners	1–2	1–2	2–4	0.333	–
Texas Rangers	1–2	1–5	2–7	0.222	–
	8–8	5–13	13–21	0.382	–
National League
Atlanta Braves	2–1	2–1	4–2	0.667	–
Florida Marlins	2–1	N/A	2–1	0.667	–
New York Mets	1–2	N/A	1–2	0.333	–
Philadelphia Phillies	N/A	2–1	2–1	0.667	-
Washington Nationals	N/A	2–1	2–1	0.667	-
	5–4	6–3	11–7	0.611	–

Month	Games	Won	Lost	Pct.
April	22	14	8	0.636
May	29	15	14	0.517
June	26	18	8	0.692
July	25	13	12	0.520
August	28	16	12	0.571
September	28	15	13	0.536
October	4	4	0	1.000
	162	95	67	0.586

== Game log ==
Legend
Red Sox win	Red Sox loss	Game postponed

2009 game log
April (14–8)

#	Date	Opponent	Score	Win	Loss	Save	Attendance	Record
	April 6	Rays	Postponed					
1	April 7	Rays	5–3	Beckett (1–0)	Shields (0–1)	Papelbon (1)	37,057	1–0
2	April 8	Rays	7–2	Kazmir (1–0)	Lester (0–1)	Balfour (1)	37,552	1–1
3	April 9	Rays	4–3	Garza (1–0)	Matsuzaka (0–1)	Percival (1)	37,784	1–2
4	April 10	@ Angels	6–3	Weaver (1–0)	Wakefield (0–1)	Shields (1)	41,385	1–3
5	April 11	@ Angels	5–4	Penny (1–0)	Saunders (1–1)	Papelbon (2)	40,163	2–3
6	April 12	@ Angels	5–4	Moseley (1–0)	Beckett (1–1)	Fuentes (2)	38,076	2–4
7	April 13	@ Athletics	8–2	Braden (1–1)	Lester (0–2)		21,331	2–5
8	April 14	@ Athletics	6–5 (12)	Gallagher (1–0)	López (0–1)		22,132	2–6
9	April 15	@ Athletics	8–2	Wakefield (1–1)	Anderson (0–2)		35,067	3–6
10	April 17	Orioles	10–8	Ramírez (1–0)	Báez (0–1)	Papelbon (3)	38,266	4–6
11	April 18	Orioles	6–4	Beckett (2–1)	Eaton (0–2)	Papelbon (4)	37,559	5–6
12	April 19	Orioles	2–1	Lester (1–2)	Uehara (2–1)	Saito (1)	37,869	6–6
13	April 20	Orioles	12–1	Masterson (1–0)	Hendrickson (1–2)		37,865	7–6
	April 21	Twins	Postponed					
14	April 22	Twins	10–1 (8)	Wakefield (2–1)	Baker (0–2)			8–6
15	April 22	Twins	7–3	Penny (2–0)	Liriano (0–4)		37,494	9–6
16	April 24	Yankees	5–4 (11)	Ramírez (2–0)	Marte (0–1)		38,163	10–6
17	April 25	Yankees	16–11	Okajima (1–0)	Albaladejo (1–1)		37,699	11–6
18	April 26	Yankees	4–1	Masterson (2–0)	Pettitte (2–1)	Saito (2)	38,154	12–6
19	April 27	@ Indians	3–1	Delcarmen (1–0)	Wood (0–1)	Papelbon (5)	18,652	13–6
20	April 28	@ Indians	9–8	Wood (1–1)	López (0–2)		19,613	13–7
21	April 29	@ Indians	6–5 (10)	Okajima (2–0)	Lewis (2–3)	Papelbon (6)	19,137	14–7
22	April 30	@ Rays	13–0	Garza (2–2)	Beckett (2–2)		20,341	14–8

May (15–14)

#	Date	Opponent	Score	Win	Loss	Save	Attendance	Record
23	May 1	@ Rays	6–2	Sonnanstine (1–3)	Masterson (2–1)		27,045	14–9
24	May 2	@ Rays	10–6	Wakefield (3–1)	Niemann (2–3)		34,910	15–9
25	May 3	@ Rays	5–3	Shields (3–2)	Penny (2–1)	Percival (3)	32,332	15–10
26	May 4	@ Yankees	6–4	Lester (2–2)	Hughes (1–1)	Papelbon (7)	46,426	16–10
27	May 5	@ Yankees	7–3	Beckett (3–2)	Chamberlain (1–1)		46,810	17–10
28	May 6	Indians	9–2	Pavano (2–3)	Masterson (2–2)	Laffey (1)	37,888	17–11
29	May 7	Indians	13–3	Wakefield (4–1)	Sowers (0–1)		37,541	18–11
30	May 8	Rays	7–3	Penny (3–1)	Shields (3–3)		37,745	19–11
31	May 9	Rays	14–5	Kazmir (4–3)	Lester (2–3)	Cormier (1)	37,773	19–12
32	May 10	Rays	4–3	Ramírez (3–0)	Shouse (1–1)	Papelbon (8)	37,759	20–12
33	May 12	@ Angels	4–3	Ramírez (4–0)	Shields (1–3)	Papelbon (9)	33,411	21–12
34	May 13	@ Angels	8–4	Palmer (4–0)	Wakefield (4–2)		35,666	21–13
35	May 14	@ Angels	5–4 (12)	Bulger (1–1)	Delcarmen (1–1)		35,124	21–14
36	May 15	@ Mariners	5–4	Jakubauskas (2–4)	Lester (2–4)	Aardsma (4)	34,952	21–15
37	May 16	@ Mariners	5–3	Beckett (4–2)	Olson (0–1)	Papelbon (10)	42,589	22–15
38	May 17	@ Mariners	3–2	Aardsma (1–1)	Ramírez (4–1)		40,833	22–16
39	May 19	Blue Jays	2–1	Wakefield (5–2)	Tallet (2–2)	Papelbon (11)	37,830	23–16
40	May 20	Blue Jays	8–3	Penny (4–1)	Cecil (2–1)		38,099	24–16
41	May 21	Blue Jays	5–1	Lester (3–4)	Ray (1–2)		38,347	25–16
42	May 22	Mets	5–3	Santana (6–2)	Matsuzaka (0–2)	Rodríguez (12)	38,092	25–17
43	May 23	Mets	3–2	Feliciano (1–1)	Papelbon (0–1)	Putz (2)	37,871	25–18
44	May 24	Mets	12–5	Wakefield (6–2)	Redding (0–1)		37,446	26–18
45	May 25	@ Twins	6–5	Penny (5–1)	Liriano (2–6)	Papelbon (12)	27,636	27–18
46	May 26	@ Twins	5–2	Blackburn (4–2)	Lester (3–5)	Nathan (7)	20,019	27–19
47	May 27	@ Twins	4–2	Slowey (7–1)	Matsuzaka (0–3)	Nathan (8)	28,221	27–20
48	May 28	@ Twins	3–1	Beckett (5–2)	Swarzak (1–1)	Papelbon (13)	23,958	28–20
49	May 29	@ Blue Jays	6–3	Janssen (1–1)	Wakefield (6–3)	Downs (6)	32,026	28–21
50	May 30	@ Blue Jays	5–3	Tallet (3–3)	Ramírez (4–2)	Downs (7)	35,484	28–22
51	May 31	@ Blue Jays	8–2	Lester (4–5)	Romero (2–2)		30,496	29–22

June (18–8)

#	Date	Opponent	Score	Win	Loss	Save	Attendance	Record
52	June 2	@ Tigers	5–1	Matsuzaka (1–3)	Porcello (6–4)		25,914	30–22
53	June 3	@ Tigers	10–5	Beckett (6–2)	Galarraga (3–6)		29,240	31–22
54	June 4	@ Tigers	6–3	Wakefield (7–3)	Willis (1–3)	Papelbon (14)	31,353	32–22
55	June 5	Rangers	5–1	Millwood (5–4)	Penny (5–2)		37,519	32–23
56	June 6	Rangers	8–1	Lester (5–5)	Holland (1–3)		37,828	33–23
57	June 7	Rangers	6–3	Padilla (4–3)	Matsuzaka (1–4)	Wilson (5)	37,537	33–24
58	June 9	Yankees	7–0	Beckett (7–2)	Burnett (4–3)		37,883	34–24
59	June 10	Yankees	6–5	Wakefield (8–3)	Wang (0–4)	Papelbon (15)	38,121	35–24
60	June 11	Yankees	4–3	Saito (1–0)	Sabathia (5–4)	Papelbon (16)	38,153	36–24
61	June 12	@ Phillies	5–2 (13)	Saito (2–0)	Kendrick (0–1)	Bard (1)	45,321	37–24
62	June 13	@ Phillies	11–6	Okajima (3–0)	Bastardo (2–1)		45,202	38–24
63	June 14	@ Phillies	11–6	Park (3–1)	Beckett (7–3)		45,141	38–25
64	June 16	Marlins	8–2	Wakefield (9–3)	Volstad (4–7)		38,149	39–25
65	June 17	Marlins	6–1	Penny (6–2)	Miller (2–3)		38,196	40–25
66	June 18	Marlins	2–1 (6)	Nolasco (3–6)	Lester (5–6)		37,577	40–26
67	June 19	Braves	8–2	Kawakami (4–6)	Matsuzaka (1–5)		37,703	40–27
68	June 20	Braves	3–0	Beckett (8–3)	Lowe (7–5)		38,029	41–27
69	June 21	Braves	6–5	Papelbon (1–1)	Bennett (2–4)		37,243	42–27
70	June 23	@ Nationals	11–3	Delcarmen (2–1)	Tavárez (3–5)		41,517	43–27
71	June 24	@ Nationals	6–4	Lester (6–6)	Stammen (1–3)	Papelbon (17)	41,530	44–27
72	June 25	@ Nationals	9–3	Zimmermann (3–3)	Smoltz (0–1)		41,985	44–28
73	June 26	@ Braves	4–1	Beckett (9–3)	Jurrjens (5–6)		48,418	45–28
74	June 27	@ Braves	1–0	Wakefield (10–3)	Vázquez (5–7)	Papelbon (18)	48,151	46–28
75	June 28	@ Braves	2–1	Hanson (4–0)	Penny (6–3)	González (9)	41,463	46–29
76	June 29	@ Orioles	4–0	Lester (7–6)	Berken (1–5)	Papelbon (19)	36,548	47–29
77	June 30	@ Orioles	11–10	Hendrickson (3–4)	Saito (2–1)	Sherrill (17)	31,969	47–30

July (13–12)

#	Date	Opponent	Score	Win	Loss	Save	Attendance	Record
78	July 1	@ Orioles	6–5 (11)	Ramírez (5–2)	Báez (4–2)	Papelbon (20)	29,391	48–30
79	July 3	Mariners	7–6 (11)	Jakubauskas (5–5)	Ramírez (5–3)	Lowe (1)	38,078	48–31
80	July 4	Mariners	3–2	Corcoran (2–0)	Saito (2–2)	Aardsma (17)	37,656	48–32
81	July 5	Mariners	8–4	Masterson (3–2)	Batista (5–3)		37,691	49–32
82	July 6	Athletics	6–0	Anderson (5–7)	Smoltz (0–2)		38,294	49–33
83	July 7	Athletics	5–2	Beckett (10–3)	Eveland (1–3)	Papelbon (21)	37,676	50–33
84	July 8	Athletics	5–4	Wakefield (11–3)	Cahill (5–8)	Papelbon (22)	37,981	51–33
85	July 9	Royals	8–6	Hochevar (5–3)	Masterson (3–3)	Soria (14)	38,189	51–34
86	July 10	Royals	1–0	Lester (8–6)	Bannister (6–7)	Papelbon (23)	38,116	52–34
87	July 11	Royals	15–9	Smoltz (1–2)	Meche (4–9)		37,825	53–34
88	July 12	Royals	6–0	Beckett (11–3)	Chen (0–4)		37,612	54–34
All-Star Break: AL def. NL at Busch Stadium, 4–3
89	July 17	@ Blue Jays	4–1	Buchholz (1–0)	Romero (7–4)	Papelbon (24)	32,928	55–34
90	July 18	@ Blue Jays	6–2	Rzepczynski (1–1)	Penny (6–4)		36,926	55–35
91	July 19	@ Blue Jays	3–1	Halladay (11–3)	Lester (8–7)		36,534	55–36
92	July 20	@ Rangers	6–3	Millwood (9–7)	Smoltz (1–3)	Wilson (8)	28,916	55–37
93	July 21	@ Rangers	4–2	Hunter (9–7)	Beckett (11–4)	Wilson (9)	28,555	55–38
94	July 22	@ Rangers	3–1	Nippert (2–0)	Buchholz (1–1)	Mathis (1)	39,778	55–39
95	July 24	Orioles	3–1	Penny (7–4)	Bergesen (6–5)	Papelbon (25)	38,058	56–39
96	July 25	Orioles	7–2	Lester (9–7)	Guthrie (7–9)		38,063	57–39
97	July 26	Orioles	6–2	Hernandez (3–2)	Smoltz (1–4)		37,606	57–40
98	July 27	Athletics	8–2	Beckett (12–4)	Cahill (6–9)		37,955	58–40
99	July 28	Athletics	9–8 (11)	Berslow (4–4)	Delcarmen (2–2)	Bailey (12)	38,084	58–41
100	July 29	Athletics	8–6	Anderson (6–8)	Penny (7–5)	Bailey (13)	38,193	58–42
101	July 30	Athletics	8–5	Delcarmen (3–2)	Breslow (4–5)	Papelbon (26)	37,919	59–42
102	July 31	@ Orioles	6–5	Smoltz (2–4)	Guthrie (7–10)	Papelbon (27)	44,091	60–42

August (16–12)

#	Date	Opponent	Score	Win	Loss	Save	Attendance	Record
103	August 1	@ Orioles	4–0	Beckett (13–4)	Hernandez (3–3)		49,384	61–42
104	August 2	@ Orioles	18–10	Delcarmen (4–2)	Berken (1–9)		43,115	62–42
105	August 4	@ Rays	4–2 (13)	Cormier (2–1)	Saito (2–3)		29,873	62–43
106	August 5	@ Rays	6–4	Price (5–4)	Penny (7–6)	Howell (12)	31,517	62–44
107	August 6	@ Yankees	13–6	Chamberlain (8–2)	Smoltz (2–5)		49,005	62–45
108	August 7	@ Yankees	2–0 (15)	Coke (3–3)	Tazawa (0–1)		48,262	62–46
109	August 8	@ Yankees	5–0	Sabathia (12–7)	Buchholz (1–2)		48,796	62–47
110	August 9	@ Yankees	5–2	Coke (4–3)	Bard (0–1)	Rivera (32)	48,190	62–48
111	August 10	Tigers	6–5	Ramírez (6–3)	Miner (5–2)	Papelbon (28)	37,960	63–48
112	August 11	Tigers	7–5	Tazawa (1–1)	Lambert (0–1)		38,013	64–48
113	August 12	Tigers	8–2	Beckett (14–4)	Miner (5–3)		38,124	65–48
114	August 13	Tigers	2–0	Verlander (13–6)	Buchholz (1–3)	Rodney (24)	37,556	65–49
115	August 14	@ Rangers	8–4	Saito (3–3)	Francisco (2–2)		40,311	66–49
116	August 15	@ Rangers	7–2	Holland (6–7)	Penny (7–7)	Feliz (1)	48,201	66–50
117	August 16	@ Rangers	4–3	Nippert (4–1)	Tazawa (1–2)	Francisco (17)	27,155	66–51
118	August 18	@ Blue Jays	10–9	Okajima (4–0)	Janssen (2–4)	Papelbon (29)	25,472	67–51
119	August 19	@ Blue Jays	6–1	Buchholz (2–3)	Halladay (13–6)		25,925	68–51
120	August 20	@ Blue Jays	8–1	Lester (10–7)	Cecil (5–2)		22,817	69–51
121	August 21	Yankees	20–11	Pettitte (10–6)	Penny (7–8)		37,869	69–52
122	August 22	Yankees	14–1	Tazawa (2–2)	Burnett (10–7)		37,277	70–52
123	August 23	Yankees	8–4	Sabathia (15–7)	Beckett (14–5)		38,008	70–53
124	August 24	White Sox	12–8	Ramírez (6–3)	Contreras (5–7)		37,812	71–53
125	August 25	White Sox	6–3	Delcarmen (5–2)	Linebrink (3–6)	Papelbon (30)	38,059	72–53
126	August 26	White Sox	3–2	Bard (1–1)	Peña (6–5)		37,839	73–53
127	August 27	White Sox	9–5	Danks (12–8)	Tazawa (2–3)		38,003	73–54
128	August 28	Blue Jays	6–5	Okajima (5–0)	Tallet (5–8)	Papelbon (31)	37,844	74–54
129	August 29	Blue Jays	3–2	Buchholz (3–3)	Romero (11–6)	Papelbon (32)	37,452	75–54
130	August 30	Blue Jays	7–0	Byrd (1–0)	Halladay (13–8)		37,560	76–54

September (15–13)

#	Date	Opponent	Score	Win	Loss	Save	Attendance	Record
131	September 1	@ Rays	8–4	Lester (11–7)	Sonnanstine (6–8)	Papelbon (33)	17,692	77–54
132	September 2	@ Rays	8–5	Howell (7–4)	Ramírez (7–4)	Wheeler (2)	19,148	77–55
133	September 3	@ Rays	6–3	Buchholz (4–3)	Price (7–7)	Papelbon (34)	20,823	78–55
134	September 4	@ White Sox	12–2	García (1–2)	Byrd (1–1)		28,839	78–56
135	September 5	@ White Sox	5–1	Floyd (11–9)	Wakefield (11–4)		33,239	76–57
136	September 6	@ White Sox	6–1	Lester (12–7)	Danks (12–9)		32,134	79–57
137	September 7	@ White Sox	5–1	Buehrle (12–7)	Beckett (14–6)		22,511	79–58
138	September 8	Orioles	10–0	Buchholz (5–3)	Hernandez (4–7)		37,647	80–58
139	September 9	Orioles	7–5	Wagner (1–0)	Albers (2–5)	Papelbon (35)	37,712	81–58
	September 11	Rays	Postponed					
140	September 12	Rays	9–1 (6)	Beckett (15–6)	Davis (0–1)		37,755	82–58
141	September 13	Rays	3–1	Okajima (6–0)	Garza (7–10)	Papelbon (36)	38,228	83–58
142	September 13	Rays	4–0	Lester (13–7)	Shields (9–11)		37,271	84–58
143	September 15	Angels	4–1	Matsuzaka (2–5)	Lackey (10–8)		37,942	85–58
144	September 16	Angels	9–8	Bard (2–1)	Fuentes (1–5)		37,706	86–58
145	September 17	Angels	4–3	Jepsen (6–3)	Wagner (1–1)	Fuentes (42)	38,157	86–59
146	September 18	@ Orioles	3–1	Buchholz (6–3)	Guthrie (10–15)	Papelbon (37)	26,812	87–59
147	September 19	@ Orioles	11–5	Lester (14–7)	Albers (2–6)		39,285	88–59
148	September 20	@ Orioles	9–3	Matsuzaka (3–5)	Berken (5–12)		27,546	89–59
149	September 21	@ Royals	12–9	Yabuta (2–1)	Bard (2–2)	Soria (27)	16,770	89–60
150	September 22	@ Royals	5–1	Greinke (15–8)	Byrd (1–2)	Soria (28)	21,228	89–61
151	September 23	@ Royals	9–2	Beckett (16–6)	Hochevar (7–11)		18,989	90–61
152	September 24	@ Royals	10–3	Buchholz (7–3)	Lerew (0–1)		20,807	91–61
153	September 25	@ Yankees	9–5	Chamberlain (9–6)	Lester (14–8)		48,449	91–62
154	September 26	@ Yankees	3–0	Sabathia (19–7)	Matsuzaka (3–6)	Rivera (43)	48,809	91–63
155	September 27	@ Yankees	4–2	Pettitte (14–7)	Byrd (1–3)	Rivera (44)	47,576	91–64
156	September 28	Blue Jays	11–5 (7)	Richmond (8–10)	Bowden (0–1)		37,591	91–65
157	September 29	Blue Jays	8–7	Romero (13–9)	Buchholz (7–4)	Frasor (11)	37,618	91–66
158	September 30	Blue Jays	12–0	Halladay (17–10)	Wakefield (11–5)		37,246	91–67

October (4–0)

#	Date	Opponent	Score	Win	Loss	Save	Attendance	Record
159	October 1	Indians	3–0	Lester (15–8)	Carrasco (0–4)	Papelbon (38)	37,459	92–67
160	October 2	Indians	6–2	Matsuzaka (4–6)	Sowers (6–11)		37,787	93–67
161	October 3	Indians	11–6	Beckett (17–6)	Laffey (7–9)		37,562	94–67
162	October 4	Indians	12–7	Bowden (1–1)	Ohka (1–5)		37,247	95–67

2009 postseason game log
ALDS vs. Los Angeles Angels of Anaheim (0–3)

#	Date	Opponent	Score	Win	Loss	Save	Stadium	Attendance	Record	Box
1	October 8	@ Angels	5–0	Lackey (1–0)	Lester (0–1)		Angel Stadium of Anaheim	45,070	0–1	
2	October 9	@ Angels	4–1	Weaver (1–0)	Beckett (0–1)	Fuentes (1)	Angel Stadium of Anaheim	45,223	0–2	
3	October 11	Angels	7–6	Oliver (1–0)	Papelbon (0–1)	Fuentes (2)	Fenway Park	38,704	0–3	

== Player stats ==
=== Batting ===
Note: G = Games played; AB = At bats; R = Runs scored; H = Hits; 2B = Doubles; 3B = Triples; HR = Home runs; RBI = Runs batted in; AVG = Batting average; SB = Stolen bases

Player	G	AB	R	H	2B	3B	HR	RBI	AVG	SB
Brian Anderson	21	17	7	5	0	0	2	5	.294	0
Jeff Bailey	26	77	14	16	3	2	3	9	.208	0
Rocco Baldelli	62	150	23	38	4	1	7	23	.253	1
Daniel Bard	5	0	0	0	0	0	0	0	.---	0
Aaron Bates	5	11	2	4	2	0	0	2	.364	0
Jason Bay	151	531	103	142	29	3	36	119	.267	13
Josh Beckett	2	5	1	1	0	0	1	1	.200	0
Dusty Brown	6	3	1	1	0	0	1	1	.333	0
Clay Buchholz	1	0	0	0	0	0	0	0	.---	0
Chris Carter	4	5	0	0	0	0	0	1	.000	0
Manny Delcarmen	3	0	0	0	0	0	0	0	.---	0
J. D. Drew	137	452	84	126	30	4	24	68	.279	2
Jacoby Ellsbury	153	624	94	188	27	10	8	60	.301	70
Joey Gathright	17	16	7	5	0	0	0	0	.313	1
Álex González	44	148	26	42	10	0	5	15	.284	2
Nick Green	103	276	35	65	18	0	6	35	.236	1
Casey Kotchman	39	87	9	19	3	0	1	7	.218	1
Mark Kotsay	27	74	4	19	2	0	1	5	.257	1
George Kottaras	45	93	15	22	11	0	1	10	.237	0
Adam LaRoche	6	19	2	5	2	0	1	3	.263	0
Jon Lester	2	3	0	0	0	0	0	0	.000	0
Javier López	1	0	0	0	0	0	0	0	.---	0
Mike Lowell	119	445	54	129	29	1	17	75	.290	2
Jed Lowrie	32	68	5	10	2	0	2	11	.147	0
Julio Lugo	37	109	16	31	4	1	1	8	.284	3
Víctor Martínez	56	211	32	71	12	0	8	41	.336	1
Justin Masterson	4	0	0	0	0	0	0	0	.---	0
Daisuke Matsuzaka	1	2	0	0	0	0	0	0	.000	0
Hideki Okajima	5	1	0	0	0	0	0	0	.000	0
David Ortiz	150	541	77	129	35	1	28	99	.238	0
Jonathan Papelbon	4	0	0	0	0	0	0	0	.---	0
Dustin Pedroia	154	626	115	185	48	1	15	72	.298	20
Brad Penny	2	5	0	0	0	0	0	0	.000	0
Ramón Ramírez	3	1	0	0	0	0	0	0	.000	0
Josh Reddick	27	59	5	10	4	0	2	4	.169	0
Takashi Saito	5	0	0	0	0	0	0	0	.---	0
John Smoltz	1	2	0	0	0	0	0	0	.000	0
Jonathan Van Every	7	11	1	4	0	0	1	3	.364	0
Jason Varitek	109	364	41	76	24	0	14	51	.209	0
Gil Velazquez	6	2	0	0	0	0	0	0	.000	0
Tim Wakefield	1	2	0	1	0	0	0	0	.500	0
Chris Woodward	13	12	0	1	0	0	0	0	.083	0
Kevin Youkilis	136	491	99	150	36	1	27	94	.305	7
Team totals	162	5543	872	1495	335	25	212	822	.270	126

- Source: Boston Red Sox batting stats

=== Pitching ===
Note: W = Wins; L = Losses; ERA = Earned run average; G = Games pitched; GS = Games started; SV = Saves; IP = Innings pitched; R = Runs allowed; ER = Earned runs allowed; HR = Home Run Allowed; BB = Walks allowed; K = Strikeouts

Player	W	L	ERA	G	GS	SV	IP	R	ER	HR	BB	K
Daniel Bard	2	2	3.65	49	0	1	49.1	24	20	5	22	63
Josh Beckett	17	6	3.86	32	32	0	212.1	99	91	25	55	199
Michael Bowden	1	1	9.56	8	1	0	16.0	17	17	3	6	12
Dusty Brown	0	0	9.00	1	0	0	1.0	1	1	0	0	1
Clay Buchholz	7	4	4.21	16	16	0	92.0	44	43	13	36	68
Paul Byrd	1	3	5.82	7	6	0	34.0	22	22	4	11	11
Fernando Cabrera	0	0	8.44	6	0	0	5.1	5	5	0	4	8
Manny Delcarmen	5	2	4.53	64	0	0	59.2	34	30	5	34	44
Enrique González	0	0	4.91	2	0	0	3.2	2	2	1	2	1
Nick Green	0	0	0.00	1	0	0	2.0	0	0	0	3	0
Hunter Jones	0	0	9.24	11	0	0	12.2	13	13	3	7	9
Jon Lester	15	8	3.41	32	32	0	203.1	80	77	20	64	225
Javier López	0	2	9.26	14	0	0	11.2	13	12	1	9	5
Justin Masterson	3	3	4.50	31	6	0	72.0	38	36	7	25	67
Daisuke Matsuzaka	4	6	5.76	12	12	0	59.1	38	38	10	30	54
Hideki Okajima	6	0	3.39	68	0	0	61.1	23	23	8	21	53
Jonathan Papelbon	1	1	1.85	66	0	38	68.0	15	14	5	24	76
Brad Penny	7	8	5.61	24	24	0	131.2	89	82	17	42	89
Ramón Ramírez	7	4	2.84	70	0	0	69.2	26	22	7	32	52
Dustin Richardson	0	0	0.00	3	0	0	3.1	0	0	0	1	1
Takashi Saito	3	3	2.43	56	0	2	55.2	16	15	6	25	52
John Smoltz	2	5	8.33	8	8	0	40.0	37	37	8	9	33
Junichi Tazawa	2	3	7.46	6	4	0	25.1	23	21	4	9	13
Billy Traber	0	0	12.27	1	0	0	3.2	5	5	2	1	1
Jonathan Van Every	0	0	0.00	1	0	0	0.2	0	0	0	1	0
Billy Wagner	1	1	1.98	15	0	0	13.2	5	3	1	7	22
Tim Wakefield	11	5	4.58	21	21	0	129.2	67	66	12	50	72
Team totals	95	67	4.35	162	162	41	1436.2	736	695	167	530	1230

- Source: Boston Red Sox pitching stats

== Awards and honors ==
Awards

- Jason Bay – Silver Slugger Award (OF)
- Josh Beckett – AL Player of the Week (July 6–12)
- Mike Lowell – AL Player of the Week (April 20–26)

All-Star Game

Starters

- Dustin Pedroia 2B (did not attend)
- Jason Bay OF
Reserves

- Josh Beckett SP
- Jonathan Papelbon RP
- Tim Wakefield SP
- Kevin Youkilis 1B

Other

- Victor Martinez C/1B (acquired after all-star break)

Recognition

- On December 22, 2009, Sports Illustrated named general manager Theo Epstein as No. 3 on its list of the Top 10 GMs/Executives of the Decade. The list's only other MLB general managers were Seattle and Philadelphia's Pat Gillick (at No. 7) and Oakland's Billy Beane (at No. 10).

== Farm system ==
The Class A-Advanced affiliate changed from the Lancaster JetHawks to the Salem Red Sox.

Level	Team	League	Manager
AAA	Pawtucket Red Sox	International League	Ron Johnson
AA	Portland Sea Dogs	Eastern League	Arnie Beyeler
A-Advanced	Salem Red Sox	Carolina League	Chad Epperson
A	Greenville Drive	South Atlantic League	Kevin Boles
A-Short Season	Lowell Spinners	New York–Penn League	Gary DiSarcina
Rookie	GCL Red Sox	Gulf Coast League	Dave Tomlin
Rookie	DSL Red Sox	Dominican Summer League	José Zapata
