= Scott Feldman =

American baseball player (born 1983)

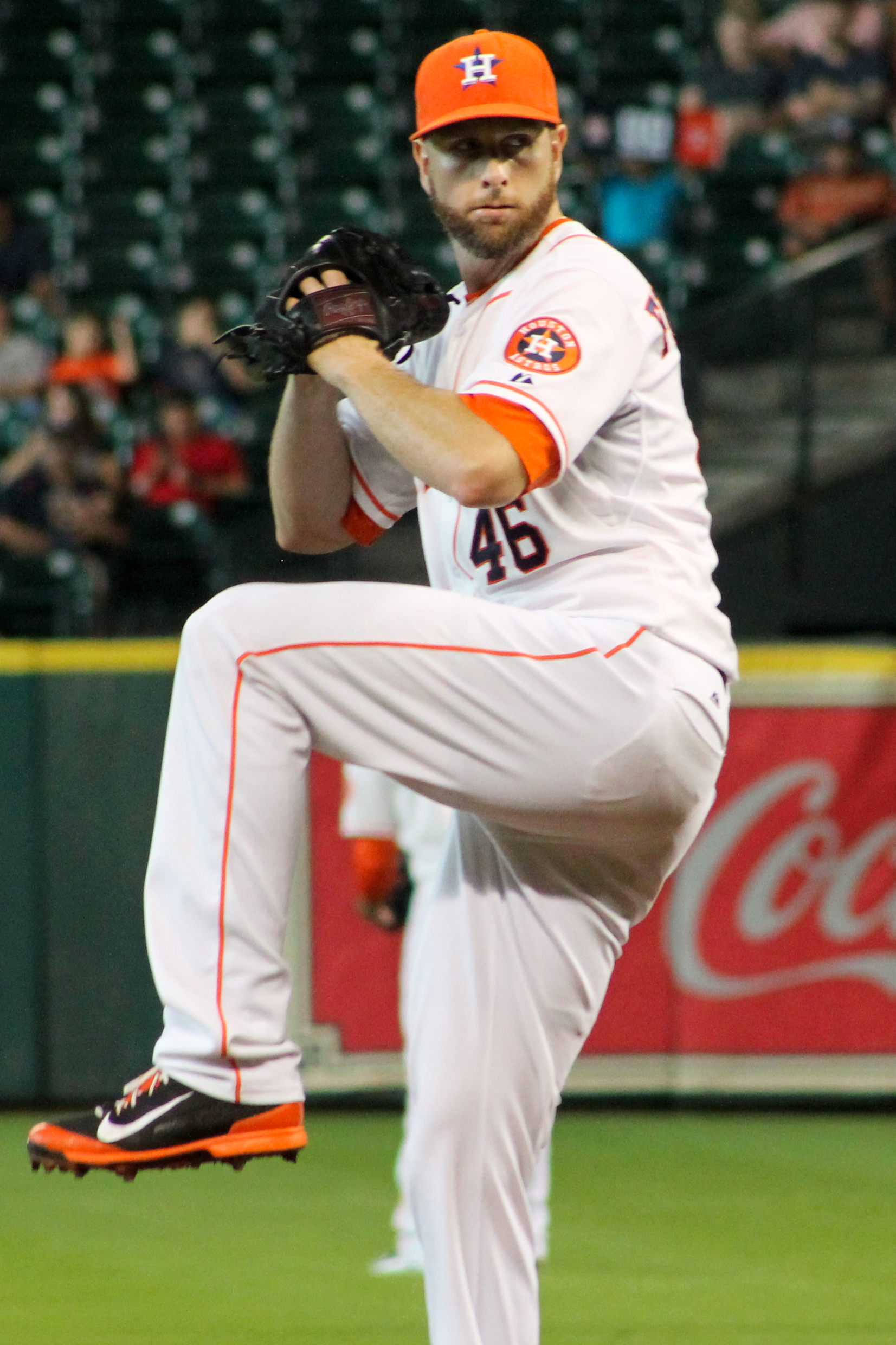
- Feldman with the Houston Astros in 2014
- Pitcher
- Born: February 7, 1983 (age 43); Kailua, Hawaii, U.S.
- Batted: Left Threw: Right

MLB debut
- August 31, 2005, for the Texas Rangers

Last MLB appearance
- August 17, 2017, for the Cincinnati Reds

MLB statistics
- Win–loss record: 78–84
- Earned run average: 4.43
- Strikeouts: 882
- Stats at Baseball Reference

Teams
- Texas Rangers (2005–2012); Chicago Cubs (2013); Baltimore Orioles (2013); Houston Astros (2014–2016); Toronto Blue Jays (2016); Cincinnati Reds (2017)

Scott Wynne Feldman (born February 7, 1983) is an American former professional baseball pitcher. He played in Major League Baseball (MLB) for the Texas Rangers, Chicago Cubs, Baltimore Orioles, Houston Astros, Toronto Blue Jays, and Cincinnati Reds.

After going 25–2 in his first two years of college baseball, he was drafted in the 30th round by the Texas Rangers in 2003. Feldman had Tommy John surgery later that year. He followed it up with a minor league career in which he had a 2.70 ERA, and held batters to only 6.6 hits per 9 innings, pitching almost exclusively in relief.

After pitching out of the bullpen while bouncing back and forth between Texas and its Triple-A affiliate in 2005–07, Feldman converted to a starter in 2008. He established himself in 2009 with a breakout season for the Rangers. He was 17–8, tied for 4th in the American League in wins, and tied the major league record with 12 victories on the road. As the Reds' Opening Day starter in 2017, he became one of 52 pitchers to have started Opening Day for at least three major league teams.

== Early and personal life ==
Feldman was born in Kailua, Hawaii, and grew up in Burlingame, California. He is Jewish, as is his father, and the family belonged to Peninsula Temple Sholom in Burlingame for a period of time. His father, an FBI agent who grew up in a Pennsylvania coal mining town and played college baseball at Duquesne, coached Feldman in youth baseball in Northern California.

The 6-foot-5-inch (196 cm) Feldman was big from an early age. "His second-grade teacher made a comment to my wife that it was like 'Alice in Wonderland,' because Scott was always too big for his seat", his father recalls.

As for Feldman's road to the major leagues, "The dream started off like any other kid", Feldman said. "You’d think about it as you were watching games in front of the TV, and you’d think about it playing in the neighborhood park with your friends. You always hope, but you just don’t know if it's ever going to happen."

He went to Lincoln Elementary, Burlingame Intermediate School, and later Burlingame High School in Burlingame, where he pitched a no-hitter. Feldman led the Peninsula Athletic League in batting average in his junior year. He was overweight in high school; at one point he was up to 265 pounds (120 kg).

In 2018, Feldman was one of 42 players born in Hawaii to have made it to the majors. In 2014, he and Jerome Williams joined Brian Fisher (1990) and Sid Fernandez (1997) as the only Hawaiian-born players to ever pitch for the Astros.

== College ==
Feldman lost 40 pounds (18 kg) before the start of his freshman year at the College of San Mateo, and walked on to the team. In two seasons, he went 25–2, with a 1.30 ERA and a strikeout-to-walk ratio of 8-to-1. "When Feldman pitched", said Bulldogs coach Doug Williams, "the game was 95% over." He earned Coast Conference Pitcher of the Year honors both as a freshman in 2002 and as a sophomore in 2003, and was also an All-American both years. "He has a gift", Williams said.

Picked in the 41st round (1,241st overall) of the 2002 Major League Baseball draft by the Houston Astros, he did not sign. He was then drafted again, in the 30th round (886th overall) of the 2003 Draft by the Texas Rangers, 13 rounds behind future teammate Ian Kinsler, and this time he signed with the Rangers after they offered him a lucrative contract.

== Minor leagues ==
Feldman underwent reconstructive elbow surgery for a torn ulnar collateral ligament in October 2003. In his four appearances in 2004 for the Arizona League Rangers in the Arizona League, he pitched seven scoreless innings. He began the 2005 season with the Single-A Bakersfield Blaze, but after nine scoreless innings in relief was quickly promoted to the Double-A Frisco RoughRiders.

On July 28, 2005, Feldman and two teammates threw a perfect game against the Corpus Christi Hooks. It was the first combined nine-inning perfect game in Texas League history, and the third overall. Feldman was tasked with getting the last three outs, and with two outs in the ninth he let the count get to 3–1. "I was just telling myself, 'Don't walk him,'" Feldman said. "Once it got to 3–1, I threw it right down the middle. If they got a hit, they got a hit. But they're not going to break up a perfect game on a walk." The batter grounded out. On July 31, the three pitchers shared the Texas League Pitcher of the Week Award.

With the RoughRiders, he held opposing batters to a .202 batting average in 46 relief appearances, led the team with 14 saves (which tied for fifth-most in the league), and had a 2.36 ERA. For the 2005 season, between the two teams he had a 2.06 ERA and 17 saves in 52 appearances, all in relief. Baseball America tabbed him as having the best control of all minor league pitchers in the Rangers' organization.

Prior to the 2006 season, MLB.com beat reporter T. R. Sullivan opined that Feldman was the Rangers' top minor league relief prospect. In 2006, in 23 relief appearances for the Rangers' Triple-A affiliate, the Oklahoma RedHawks, he had a 1.98 ERA, and in 2007 in 21 relief appearances for the team he had a 4.50 ERA. Later in 2007, he pitched in the Arizona Fall League, to work on a new three-quarters delivery.

In 2008, as the Rangers decided to convert Feldman to a starter, he started and won a game for Frisco, taking a perfect game into the fifth and a no-hitter into the seventh ("For my first start, it was a lot of fun", Feldman said). He also started and won the two games that he pitched for Oklahoma.

Overall, through 2008 Feldman had a minor league career ERA of 2.70 in 153.1 innings in 105 games (all but six as a reliever), and gave up on average only 6.6 hits per every 9 innings.

== Major leagues ==
=== Texas Rangers (2005–2012) ===
==== 2005: Breaking in ====
Feldman was a late-season call-up in 2005. "The night before, I didn’t sleep a minute. I didn’t know what to expect, but when I walked in [the locker room], I saw a lot of the guys I had seen on TV all these years, and was like, 'Holy cow, I’m in the big leagues'", he remembers.

He made his major league debut against the Chicago White Sox on August 31, 2005. In eight relief appearances with the Rangers, he compiled a record of 0–1, with an ERA of 0.91 in 9.1 innings of work. He struck out Aaron Rowand for his first Major League strikeout.

==== 2006: Brawl ====
Towards the end of the spring training in 2006, Feldman was feeling confident that he was going to make the parent club's 25-man roster. A week before Opening Day he was called into Manager Buck Showalter's office. But instead of telling Feldman he had made the team, for the first 10 minutes Showalter and the team's pitching coach Mark Connor spoke on and on about how Feldman had had a solid spring training — but needed to work on some things. Feldman couldn't believe it but eventually thought, "Holy smoke, I’m going down [to the minors]." Suddenly, unable to continue the prank any longer, Showalter burst out laughing: "Pack your bags, rookie, you’re coming with us!"

During the regular season, Feldman bounced back and forth between the Rangers and Oklahoma.

The national spotlight shone briefly on Feldman on August 16, 2006, when he sparked a bench-clearing brawl in the ninth inning of a game between the Rangers and the Los Angeles Angels of Anaheim. Tensions between the two division rivals were already high after two Ranger starting pitchers — Adam Eaton and Vicente Padilla — had been ejected in previous games that month for throwing at Angel hitters, along with Texas manager Buck Showalter. Before Feldman took the mound in relief, on a night with a game-time temperature of 101 °F (38 °C), two Angel pitchers (Kevin Gregg and Brendan Donnelly) had already been thrown out of the game for hitting Ranger batters, and Angel manager Mike Scioscia and acting manager/bench coach Ron Roenicke had been ejected as well.

Feldman hit Angel second baseman Adam Kennedy in the buttocks with a fastball with two outs and the Rangers up 9–3. Kennedy charged the mound as the 6-foot-5-inch (1.96 m) Feldman stood atop it and threw down his glove. When Kennedy, who is 6 feet 1 inch (1.85 m), reached him, Feldman punched him in the armpit. An announcer describing the fight said, "[Feldman] even punches like he throws — sidearm and underhand." Rangers play-by-play announcer Josh Lewin even commented on Feldman's side arm punch, stating "He's a sidearm puncher too." "I didn't charge him", Feldman said in his defense. "I couldn't just stand there." Feldman was suspended for six games. As to others' reactions, Feldman said: "Everybody is telling me to take boxing lessons."

In 36 relief appearances in 2006, he had an ERA of 3.92. In games that were late and close, Feldman held the sixteen batters he faced hitless.

==== 2007: First win ====
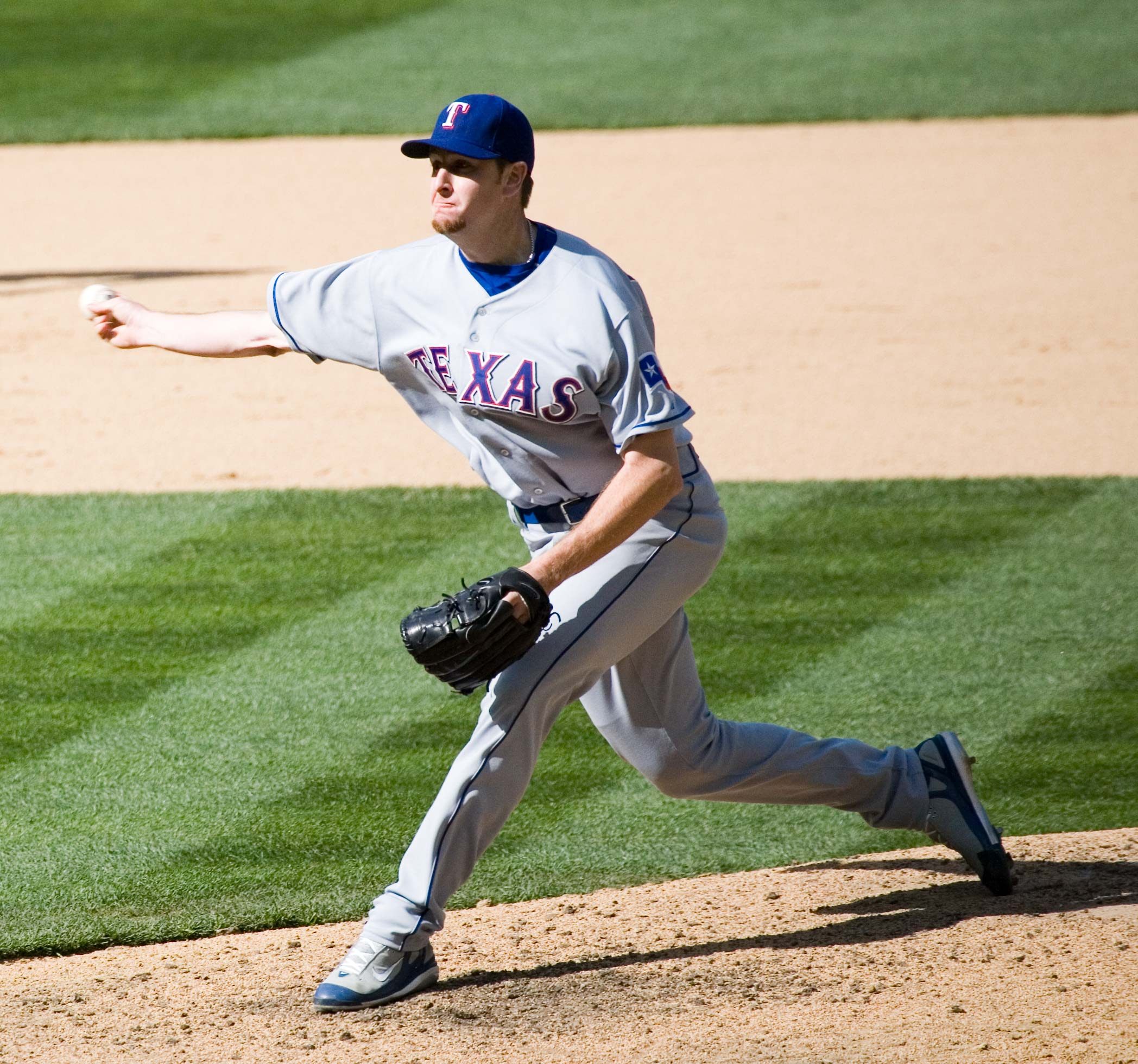
Feldman pitching in April 2007.

Feldman was in the Rangers' 2007 spring training camp, and won the final spot in the Texas bullpen. He picked up his first Major League victory on April 11 in his 47th big-league appearance. "I'll always remember it, no doubt about it", Feldman said.

He was sent down, however, on May 1. That began a trend, as he was called up and send down five more times during the season.

He made some changes in his delivery in September. Instead of throwing sidearm, he raised his arm angle and threw from a three-quarters delivery, which pitching coach Mark Connor observed gave him more sink on his fastball and downward movement on his breaking ball. "This has a chance to be pretty good", Connor said. "He was busting his fastball 94–95, the ball was sinking, and his four-seamer was cutting."

He was 1–2 for the season, with a 5.77 ERA in 29 games. He held the first batter he faced in each game to a .160 batting average, and his "ground ball:fly ball ratio" of 1.39 was the highest on the team.

==== 2008: Conversion to starter ====
In spring training in 2008, Feldman changed his release point, and used the three-quarter delivery that he had begun to use late in 2007. Manager Ron Washington noted: "It makes his ball heavier, and his movement a little more pronounced."

In late March, he was one of three pitchers vying for one long relief spot on the team, though the Rangers also began experimenting with converting him to be a starter. General Manager Jon Daniels observed: "Toward the end of spring training something clicked with his new [three-quarter] arm slot." On March 22, despite Feldman's success with his new, higher arm angle, the Rangers optioned him to Oklahoma, where he was a starter. In April he bounced back and forth between Texas and Frisco.

In his first Major League start, on April 13, he allowed three runs in six innings and did not receive a decision. "Feldman was outstanding", manager Washington said. "He hung in there and battled." Feldman recorded his first major league hit on June 13 against Óliver Pérez of the New York Mets.

On August 12, against the Boston Red Sox, he allowed 10 runs in the first inning (a team record). This was the first time a major league pitcher gave up at least 12 runs without taking a loss since Gene Packard of the St. Louis Cardinals did it on August 3, 1918).

T. R. Sullivan of MLB.com wrote towards the end of the season: "He's going to win the bronze medal for innings pitched on the Rangers this season. ... He has exceeded all expectations, and his lack of history as a starter makes it difficult to figure where this great experiment is headed." General Manager Daniels noted: "Feldman has really saved our pen this year, and he wasn't a guy we were counting on in the beginning of the season." The Rangers wanted to limit his use towards the end of the seaton, but had to keep him in the rotation because of injuries to the other pitchers.

For the season, he was 6–8 in 25 starts and three relief appearances, over 151.1 innings — just two innings fewer than he had pitched in his entire minor league career. He also led the Rangers' pitching staff in quality starts (13), quality start percentage (52%), strikes looking (29%), "grounded into double plays" (24), and "grounded into double play rate" (21%). His 13 unearned runs tied for the third-highest total in the AL.

During the off-season, club president Nolan Ryan emphasized conditioning for the Rangers pitchers. Feldman and nine other of the team's top young pitchers were brought to Arlington in November for a week-long conditioning camp. "It's different", Feldman said. "In the past, it was a little more of 'this is what you need to do, now go out and do it.' Most guys would do it, but this is their way of overseeing it and making sure everybody is ready."

==== 2009: Breakout season ====
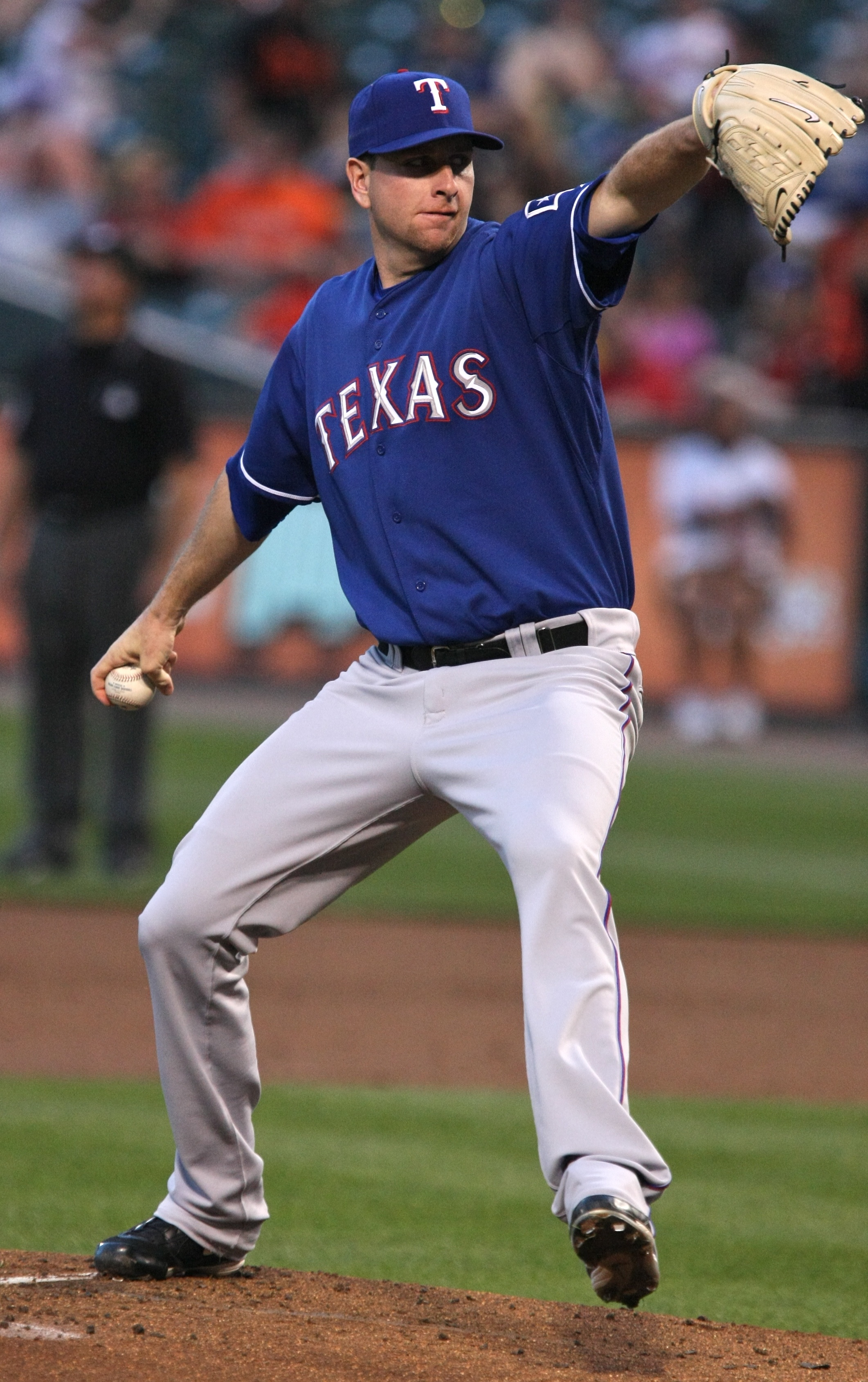
Feldman pitching in April 2009

The Rangers decided that Feldman would begin 2009 as a middle reliever, and Kris Benson would be a starter. "Feldman makes us a better team in the bullpen", explained Washington. "He goes down there with better stuff than he had before." Feldman was disappointed at the change.

Within a month Benson was injured, however, and Feldman took his place in the rotation on April 25. "I'm excited", said Feldman. "I love starting." At the suggestion of pitching coach Mike Maddux, he changed his windup to a full windmill. He remained in the rotation thereafter. In early May, Washington noted: "He has real life on his fastball, his slider is harder than it has been, his breaking ball is much crisper, and he's getting a good feel for his changeup. He's got four pitches he can throw over the plate."

Feldman began the 2009 season 5–0. He sported better mechanics and a different repertoire (a new and improved cut fastball), threw 1–2 mph harder, and kept the ball down — forcing more ground balls. "Scott Feldman has been great since we put him in the starting rotation", said Manager Washington. "He always does what you need him to do, keep you in the ballgame."

At the All Star break, despite not having moved into the starting rotation until nearly a month into the season, Feldman was 8–2, led the AL in won-lost percentage (.800), and was 9th in hits per nine innings (7.75) and walks + hits per inning pitched (1.18). "He's going to get better", said Nolan Ryan on July 20, noting Feldman's youth and his recent change in pitching style.

On July 25, Feldman outpitched Kansas City All-Star and AL ERA leader Zack Greinke with eight innings of four-hit, shutout ball, leading the Rangers to a 2–0 victory. "Feldman matched the best pitcher in baseball", Washington said. "I’m so happy for him. Two pitchers went at it pretty good, and our's won the battle." The eight innings were Feldman's major-league high, as he mixed in a changeup, curveball, and slider with his fastball.

As of the end of July, opposing batters were hitting .228 against Feldman (and only .217 in his starts), the fourth-lowest batting average in the league. In his starts through the end of July he had a 3.04 ERA, and 12 of his 17 starts were quality starts.

After he beat the Mariners on short (three days') rest at the beginning of August for the team lead in wins, Seattle manager Don Wakamatsu said: "I thought Feldman was awfully tough. I have seen this kid, and he gets better every year. I think you have to tip your hat."

As of mid-August, Feldman's cut fastball was the most effective in the major leagues. And it was the third-most-effective pitch overall, behind only Tim Lincecum's change-up and Clayton Kershaw's fastball. While in 2008 he used his cutter 13.4% of the time, in 2009 he was throwing it 30.4% of the time. The only starting pitchers who were throwing cutters more often were Brian Bannister, Doug Davis, and Halladay.

The press began to take notice. On August 14 Matthew Berry of ESPN noted that: "since April 25, when Scott Feldman ... rejoined the Rangers' rotation, only Justin Verlander has more wins than Feldman's 12." And two days later, Phil Rogers wrote for The Chicago Tribune: "Scott Feldman is creeping into consideration for the bottom of Cy Young ballots."

On August 23, Feldman threw seven scoreless innings while allowing only four hits in a win over the Tampa Bay Rays. It was his 13th win of the season (tied for third in the AL) and put his season record at 13–4. It was Feldman's ninth road win of the season (bringing him to 9–1 on the road), tying him with Sabathia for best in the AL. The win put the Rangers two games ahead of the Rays in the AL wild card standings, and one game behind the Red Sox. His career-high 11 strikeouts were the most by a Ranger since Matt Perisho struck out 12 in 1999 (see video of parts of Feldman's 11 strikeouts). Commenting on Feldman's last strikeout, Carlos Peña said: "I was on second base, and I saw a pitch that he made to B. J. [Upton], and I was like, 'Wow.' I thought to myself, 'That's unhittable right there.'" Rays manager Joe Maddon called Feldman's performance "the best-pitched game against us all year", in spite of Mark Buehrle's perfect game against them earlier in the season.

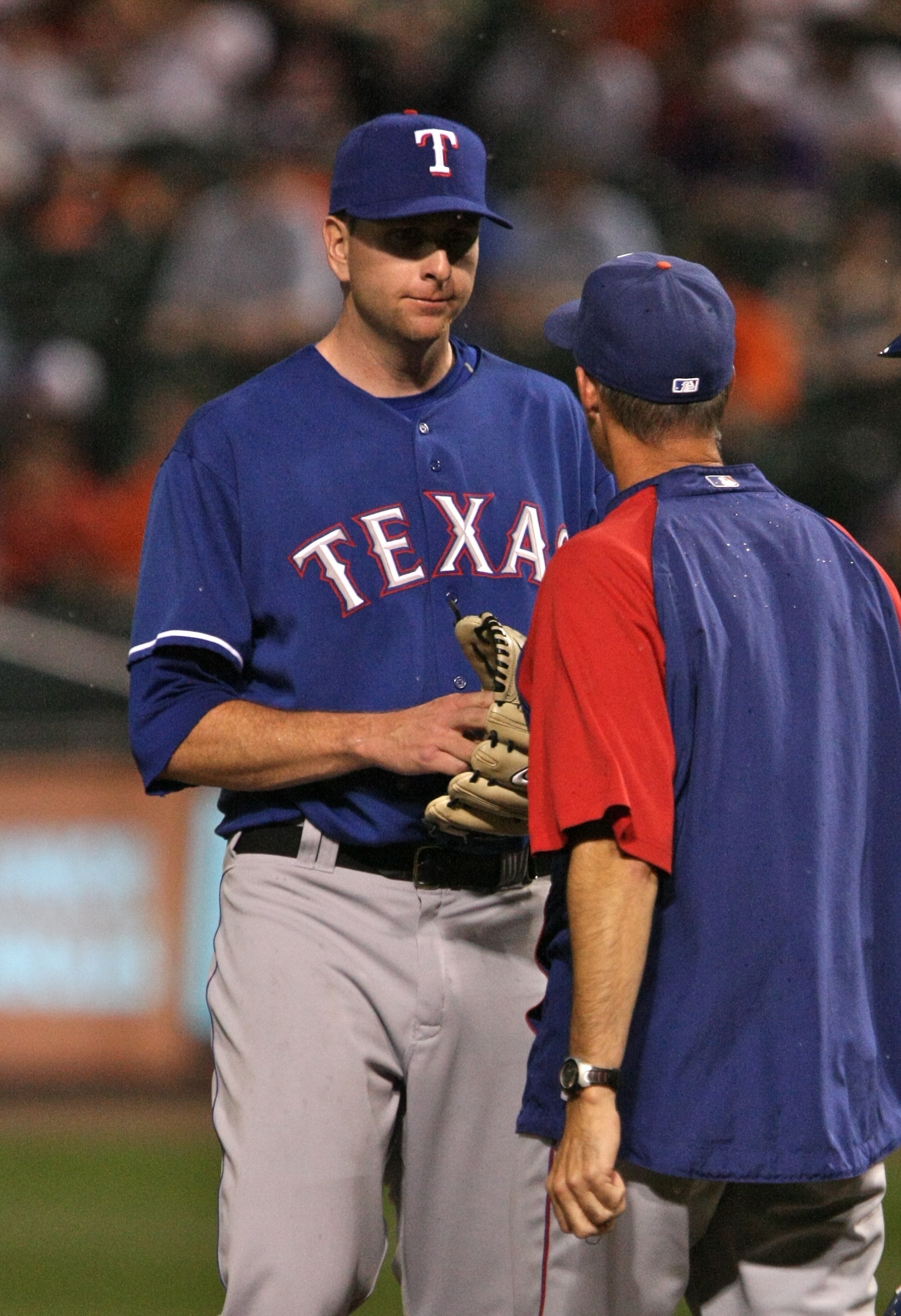
Feldman mound conference in April 2009.

On August 29, he again held the opposition scoreless, this time the Twins for 5.2 innings in a 3–0 victory. "His ball was definitely moving all over the place, with a great breaking ball", Twins manager Ron Gardenhire said. "He throws a nasty cutter, and the ball sinks. He was tough on us." It was good for his 14th win of the season (tied for second in the AL behind Sabathia), raising his record to 14–4. His cutter was more dominant than any other thrown over a single season since Baseball Info Solutions first began collecting cutter data in 2004.

On September 4, he extended his scoreless streak to 18.1 innings before giving up a run to the Baltimore Orioles in the sixth inning at Camden Yards; that was the only run he gave up over 6.2 innings in a 5–1 win, to bring his record to 15–4. It was also his 11th road victory (matching the club record held by Rick Helling (1998) and Padilla (2008)), and he matched the club record set by Bobby Witt (1990) with his 7th consecutive road win of the season. Evan Grant, writing for D Magazine, asked rhetorically: "At some point, RHP Scott Feldman is going to have to enter the Cy Young Award conversation, isn't he?"

On September 9, Feldman threw seven innings of shutout ball against the Cleveland Indians, leading Texas to a 10–0 win. He struck out five, while giving up five singles, raising his record to 16–4, and tying Sabathia and Verlander for the AL lead in victories. He became the first Rangers pitcher to win 16 games since Kevin Millwood in 2006. It was his seventh win in a row, eighth straight road victory (a new Texas record), and 12th road win overall in 2009 (another new club record, and tops in the AL). "I'm not doing anything different on the road than I am at home", said Feldman, who had allowed only one run in the last 26.1 innings. "The preparation is the same. I think it's a pretty humbling game, so you can't get too high or too low." He became the first Rangers right-hander to allow just one run over four consecutive starts. Outfielder Marlon Byrd said: "When you have your ace on the mound, you expect to win. You get a couple of runs early, and you feel you have a 'W' in hand. He has been unbelievable this year when he steps on the mound. ... He just keeps getting better."

The Boston Herald reported: "Scott Feldman started the season in the bullpen. He'll end it as a Cy Young Award candidate." Phil Rogers of the Chicago Tribune referred to him as " an under-the-radar Cy Young candidate." And Jennifer Floyd Engel of The Fort Worth Star-Telegram wrote: "Is there a more likable "stud player" on any of the locals than Scott Feldman? Dude is amazing, wins freakishly a lot on the road, is Boy Scout-ishly dependable, has been an ace on what is really a pretty good staff, and is humble as hell. He's certainly deserving to be in Cy Young conversations." Manny Navarro of The Miami Herald also referred to him as a Cy Young Award candidate.

Through September 10, he was leading the AL in won-lost percentage (.800), tied with Sabathia and Verlander for the league lead in wins (16), had the 3rd-lowest "slugging percentage against" (.359; behind Félix Hernández and Greinke), was tied for 4th in double plays induced (20), and had the 7th-lowest "OPS-against" (.670). Feldman was holding lefties to a .220 batting average, and as a starter he had kept batters to the 2nd-lowest batting-average-against on balls that they had put in play (.261) among AL starters (behind only Washburn), had the 4th-best ERA in the league (3.10; behind Greinke, Hernández, and Halladay), was tied for the 4th-lowest batting-average-against (.236), had stranded the 5th-highest percentage of runners (78.3%), and had the 5th-highest ground ball/fly ball ratio (1.48). He had the most effective cutter of all major league starters, and had thrown it 33% of the time (behind only Brian Bannister (52%) and Halladay (42%) among AL starters). Feldman had also pitched at least five innings in all but one of his 26 starts in 2009. As of mid-September, Feldman's cutter was still the third-most-effective pitch in the major leagues, behind only Tim Lincecum's changeup and Randy Wolf's fastball.

For the season, Feldman was 17–8 with a 4.08 ERA in 34 games, 31 of them starts. Despite not having become a starter until the end of April, he tied for 4th in the American League in wins, and only four pitchers in the majors had more victories. His club-record 12 victories on the road tied the major league record. Feldman became the third player in Rangers history to win at least 17 games in 31 starts or fewer, joining Kenny Rogers (17 wins in 31 starts in 1995) and Ferguson Jenkins (18 wins in 30 starts in 1978).

He was named the Texas Rangers' Pitcher of the Year for 2009 by the Dallas-Fort Worth Chapter of the Baseball Writers' Association of America.

==== 2010: Opening Day starter ====
The Rangers and Feldman agreed to a $2.425 million, one-year contract in January 2010, thereby avoiding arbitration.

On March 27, manager Ron Washington announced that Feldman would be the opening day starter for the Rangers. On April 2, the Rangers signed Feldman to a two-year, $11.5 million extension through the 2012 season, with a $9.25 million option for 2013.

Feldman was 7–11 for the season, as he started 22 games and pitched seven games out of the bullpen.

==== 2011; Injuries, and scoreless postseason ====
Feldman, had microfracture surgery performed on his right knee during the off-season. To rehab, he made two appearances for the Double-A Frisco RoughRiders and eight appearances for the Triple-A Round Rock Express. On July 8, he was transferred from the 15-day disabled list to the 60-day disabled list. He was outrighted to the minors on July 13. However, on July 14, after he cleared waivers, Feldman rejected the assignment giving the Rangers the option of activating him from the disabled list or releasing him. They opted to activate him off the disabled list, which re-added him to the 40-man roster.

In 2011, Feldman was 2–1 with a 3.94 ERA for Texas in 11 games, two of which were starts. In 32 innings he gave up 25 hits, while walking 10 and striking out 22. He limited left-handed hitters to a .155 batting average.

Brought in during the first game of the playoffs against the Tampa Bay Rays, he pitched three scoreless innings, allowing two hits while striking out four. In Game 2 of the ALCS he pitched 4 1/3 scoreless innings in relief, allowing the Detroit Tigers only one hit and no walks. He became the third pitcher in 20 years to throw at least four scoreless innings of relief in a postseason game. He pitched another scoreless inning in Game 4, and through the first two rounds of the postseason his playoff record was 8.2 innings pitched with nine strikeouts, three hits, and no walks.

In the first game of the World Series, he pitched another 1.2 innings of scoreless baseball to extend his postseason record to 10.1 scoreless innings pitched. Only eight relief pitchers had pitched more scoreless innings in a postseason, with Goose Gossage holding the record (14.1 in 1981). His postseason record in 2011 was 10.1 innings pitched with 10 strikeouts, 4 hits, and no walks.

==== 2012 ====
In 2012, Feldman was 6–11, with a 5.09 ERA in 123.2 innings. He had a 96/32 K/BB ratio. He walked one-or-fewer batters in 10-straight starts; the only Ranger with a longer single-season streak was Ferguson Jenkins with 12-straight starts in 1974.

He became a free agent on October 30, 2012, when the Rangers declined his $9.25 million 2013 option.

=== Chicago Cubs (2013) ===
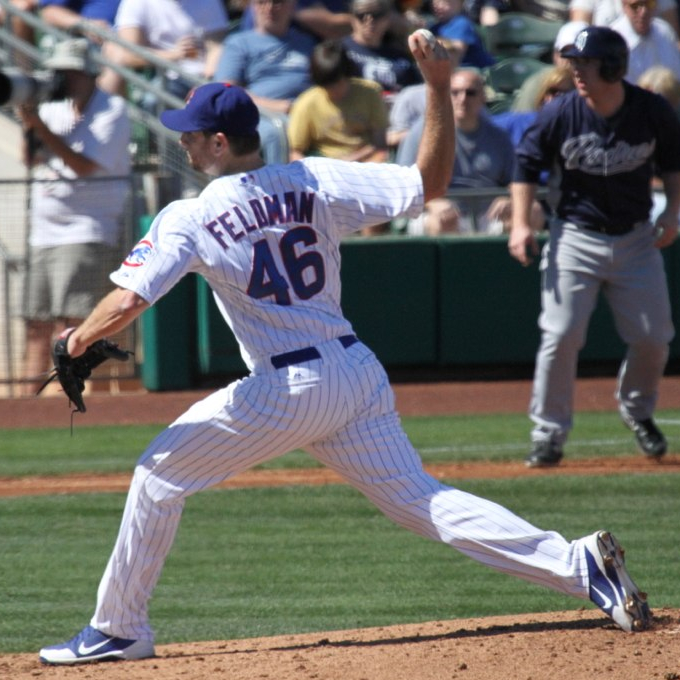
Feldman pitching for the Chicago Cubs in 2013 spring training.

On November 27, 2012, Feldman signed a one-year deal with the Chicago Cubs worth $6 million with a possible $1 million in additional incentives. General Manager Jed Hoyer indicated that the team planned to use him as a starter. On May 24, 2013, Feldman hit his first career home run off of Cincinnati Reds pitcher Bronson Arroyo. He was 7–6 with a 3.46 ERA for the Cubs until he was traded mid-season.

=== Baltimore Orioles (2013) ===
On July 2, 2013, Feldman and Steve Clevenger were traded to the Baltimore Orioles for pitchers Jake Arrieta and Pedro Strop. There, Feldman reunited with his first big league manager, Buck Showalter. His first start was on July 3, 2013, against the Chicago White Sox, a game the Orioles won 4–2 although Feldman did not get the decision. Feldman had his best start as an Oriole August 18, and was borderline dominant the entire outing. Through his first six innings, Feldman had allowed just two hits, while not allowing a single run to score. The Orioles took the victory 7–2 against the Rockies. He improved upon that outing by tossing the first complete game shutout of his career on September 6, holding the White Sox to 5 hits.

He finished the season with a combined 12–12 win–loss record and 3.86 ERA in 30 starts that included one shutout. He allowed only a .234 opponent's batting average, tied for 10th-best in the Major Leagues among righty pitchers, and a .207 average with two outs. After falling behind batters 2–0, he held them to a .131 average, the lowest in the Major Leagues. He became a free agent following the season.

=== Houston Astros (2014–2016) ===
On December 6, 2013, Feldman signed a three-year, $30 million contract with the Houston Astros.

He was the Astros' opening day starter, and beat the New York Yankees by blanking them into the seventh inning. On August 30, 2014, Feldman threw a 3-hit shutout against the Texas Rangers, giving up just 1 walk while striking 5. The Astros went on to win 2–0, winning the Silver Boot for the club for the first time since 2006.

For the season, he was 8–12 with a 3.74 ERA (the lowest over a full season in his career), in 29 starts (tied for the club lead). He was tied for sixth in the AL in complete games (2). He threw the highest percentage of curveballs among all Major League pitchers (28.9%), ahead of Sonny Gray. At 6'7, Feldman was the third-tallest pitcher in Astros history behind Randy Johnson (6' 10") and J. R. Richard (6' 8"). He received the Astros 2014 Darryl Kile Good Guy Award, voted by the Houston Chapter of the Baseball Writers' Association of America. After a successful 2014 season, Feldman struggled in 2015 and in 2016, the latter having him sent to the bullpen by the Astros.

=== Toronto Blue Jays (2016) ===
On August 1, 2016, Feldman was traded by the Astros to the Toronto Blue Jays for minor league pitcher Guadalupe Chavez. He struggled in 14 appearances for Toronto, pitching to a 2–1 record, 8.40 ERA, and 14 strikeouts in 15 innings. Feldman was on the Blue Jays' Wild Card and Division Series rosters, but was left off their Championship Series roster. He became a free agent following the season.

=== Cincinnati Reds (2017) ===
On January 26, 2017, Feldman signed a one-year, $2.3 million contract (on which he earned an additional $1.7 million in incentives) with the Cincinnati Reds. Feldman was originally assigned to pitch out of the bullpen, but with an injury to Homer Bailey, Feldman was given a chance to audition for the Reds' rotation. The preparation for the Reds' rotation made Feldman withdraw from Israel's national baseball team during the 2017 World Baseball Classic.

On March 20, Feldman was named the Reds' Opening Day starter. Having started Opening Day for the Rangers in 2010 and the Astros in 2014, he became the 52nd pitcher to start Opening Day for at least three major league teams. In the first three months of the season he had a 3.78 ERA in 97.2 innings, but then a knee injury led to him pitching in significant pain in the final four months of the season, and allowing 18 earned runs in 13 innings. He had arthroscopic surgery on his right knee to clean out damaged cartilage in August that ended his season. In 2017, Feldman was 7-7 (including one shutout), with a 4.77 ERA, in 21 starts (which led the team), and had the best strikeout rate of his career (7.5 per 9 IP). Feldman elected to become a free agent on November 2.

== Pitching ==
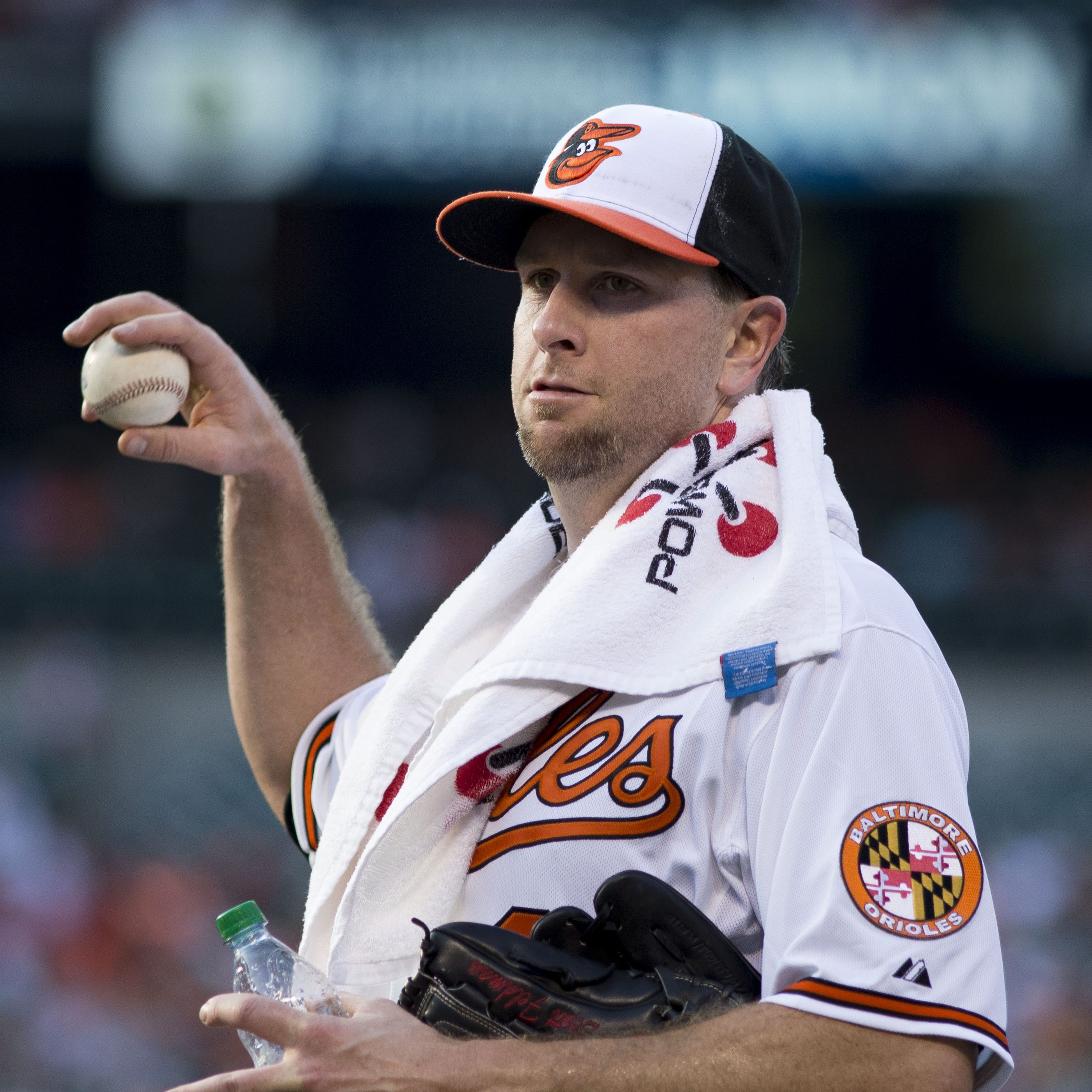
Feldman with Baltimore (2013)

Feldman is a three-quarters pitcher with a sinker, a low-to-mid-90s fastball, a hard dropping slider, a curve, a changeup, and a 90 mph cut fastball.

He changed the angle of his arm from sidearm to three-quarters in September 2007. In August 2009 a scout described him as having three "above-average pitches", and a "filthy" cutter.

== Jewish heritage ==
As of March 2007, Feldman was one of 13 Jewish baseball players in the major leagues, along with teammate Ian Kinsler. He was featured in the edition of Jewish Major Leaguers Baseball Cards, licensed by Major League Baseball, commemorating the Jewish major leaguers from 1871 through 2008. He joined, among others, Kinsler, Brad Ausmus, Kevin Youkilis, Ryan Braun, Gabe Kapler, Jason Marquis, John Grabow, Craig Breslow, Scott Schoeneweis and Jason Hirsh. In 2009, Feldman was named the Jewish Major Leaguers Pitcher of the Year, in a year in which he had more wins than any other Jewish pitcher since Steve Stone in 1980. Through 2017, he was seventh of all Jewish major leaguers in career strikeouts, behind Barry Latman, and seventh in career wins, behind Dave Roberts.

== See also ==
- Houston Astros award winners and league leaders
- List of baseball players who underwent Tommy John surgery
- List of Jewish Major League Baseball players
- List of Houston Astros Opening Day starting pitchers
- List of Texas Rangers Opening Day starting pitchers
