= Peninsula Temple Sholom =

Reform Jewish synagogue in Burlingame, California, US

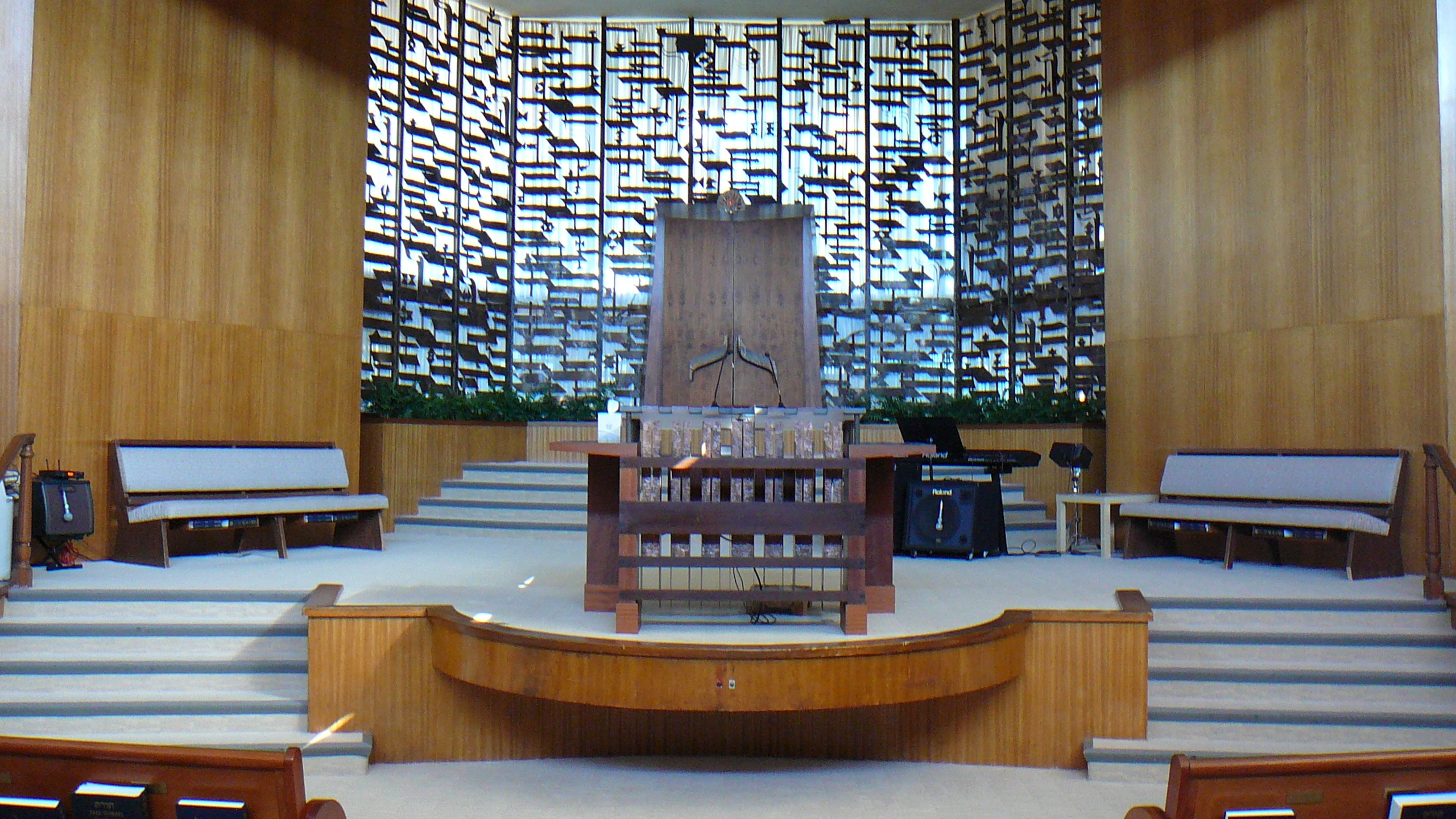
- The synagogue sanctuary and ark in 2013

- Location in San Francisco Bay Area, California

Religion
- Affiliation: Reform Judaism
- Ecclesiastical or organizational status: Synagogue
- Leadership: Rabbi Daniel Feder
- Status: Active

Location
- Location: 1655 Sebastian Drive, Burlingame, California 94010
- Country: United States
- Interactive map of Peninsula Temple Sholom
- Coordinates: 37°34′49″N 122°23′37″W

Architecture
- Type: Synagogue architecture
- Established: 1955 (as a congregation)
- Completed: 1961

Website
- sholom.org

Peninsula Temple Sholom (abbreviated as PTS) is a Reform Jewish congregation and synagogue in Burlingame, California, in the United States. Founded in 1955, and the congregation has expanded its facilities over the years to include a social hall, a religious school and a preschool.

== Rabbinical leaders ==
The following individuals have served as senior rabbi of Peninsula Temple Sholom:

Ordinal	Officeholder	Term start	Term end	Time in office	Notes
1	Gerald Raiskin, z’’l	1956	2006	49–50 years	
2	Daniel Feder	July 1, 2006	incumbent	20 years, 29 days	

== Notable members ==
- Dianna Agron, an actress
- Scott Feldman, a professional baseball player
- Bruce Pasternack, a businessman and former president of Special Olympics International

== Religious school and preschool ==
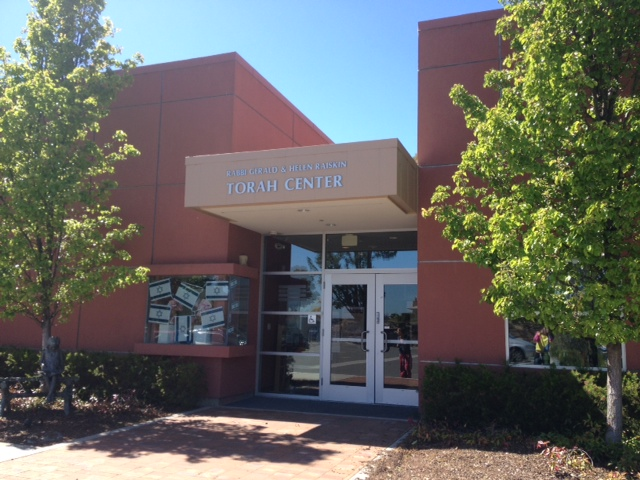
The congregation's Torah Center

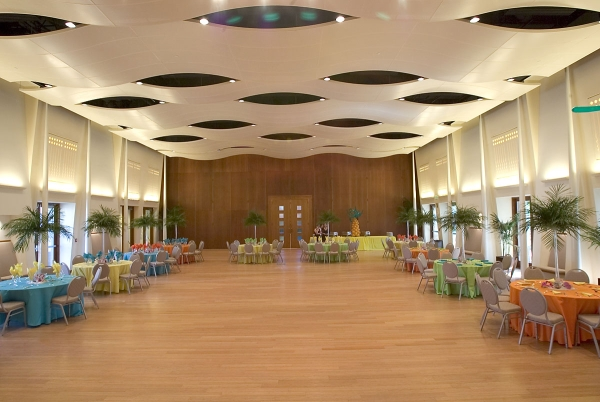
The congregation's social hall

The religious school was established in January, 1956, and 136 students were enrolled. On November 19, 1957 PTS was given the right to purchase property on Sebastian Drive for the construction of a new synagogue and religious school. In 1958, Chester Zeff was hired to be the first religious school director. In the 1982 a new preschool was added to the temple. By 2004, the temple was completely reconstructed, and a new school building opened.

Once a month each grade in the religious school has the opportunity to lead a service. The religious school curriculum includes the study of sacred texts, Jewish life cycle, Jewish ethics, Jewish holidays, the history of Israel, the holocaust, modern-day Israel, and Hebrew language.
