= Jonathan Van Every =

American baseball player (born 1979)

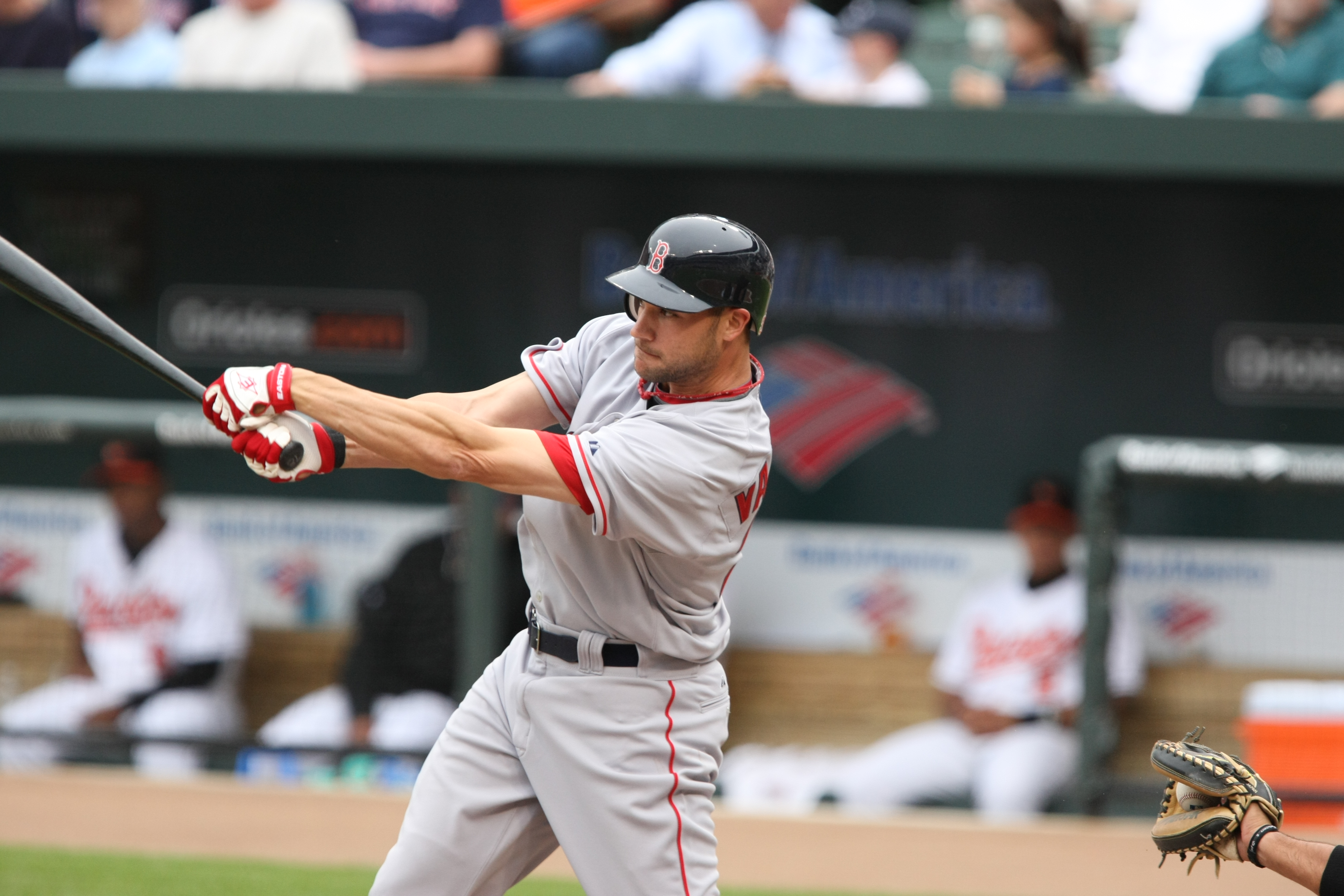
- Van Every with the Boston Red Sox
- Outfielder
- Born: November 27, 1979 (age 46); Greenwood, Mississippi, U.S.
- Batted: Left Threw: Left

MLB debut
- May 14, 2008, for the Boston Red Sox

Last MLB appearance
- May 20, 2010, for the Boston Red Sox

MLB statistics
- Batting average: .255
- Home runs: 2
- Runs batted in: 9
- Stats at Baseball Reference

Teams
- Boston Red Sox (2008–2010)

Jonathan Eugene Van Every (born November 27, 1979) is a former professional baseball outfielder. He played in Major League Baseball (MLB) from 2008 to 2010 for the Boston Red Sox.

== Amateur career ==
Van Every attended Itawamba Community College in Fulton, Mississippi where he played college baseball. At Itawamba CC, Van Every had a career batting average of .375 with 16 home runs over two seasons.

== Professional career ==
=== Cleveland Indians ===
Van Every was drafted by the Cleveland Indians in the 29th round (876th overall) of the 2000 Major League Baseball draft. He did not play in 2000 because he did not sign until May 19, 2001.

From 2001 to 2007, Van Every played in the Indians organization. His best season came in 2004, when he played for the Single-A Kinston Indians. That year, he hit .276 with 21 home runs. In 2005, he was an Eastern League All-Star.

Following the 2007 season, Van Every became a minor league free agent.

=== Boston Red Sox ===
On December 1, 2007, the Boston Red Sox signed Van Every to a minor league contract. Van Every made his major league debut on May 14, 2008, against the Baltimore Orioles, starting in center field. In his second career at-bat, he singled to center in the fifth inning off Daniel Cabrera for his first major league hit.

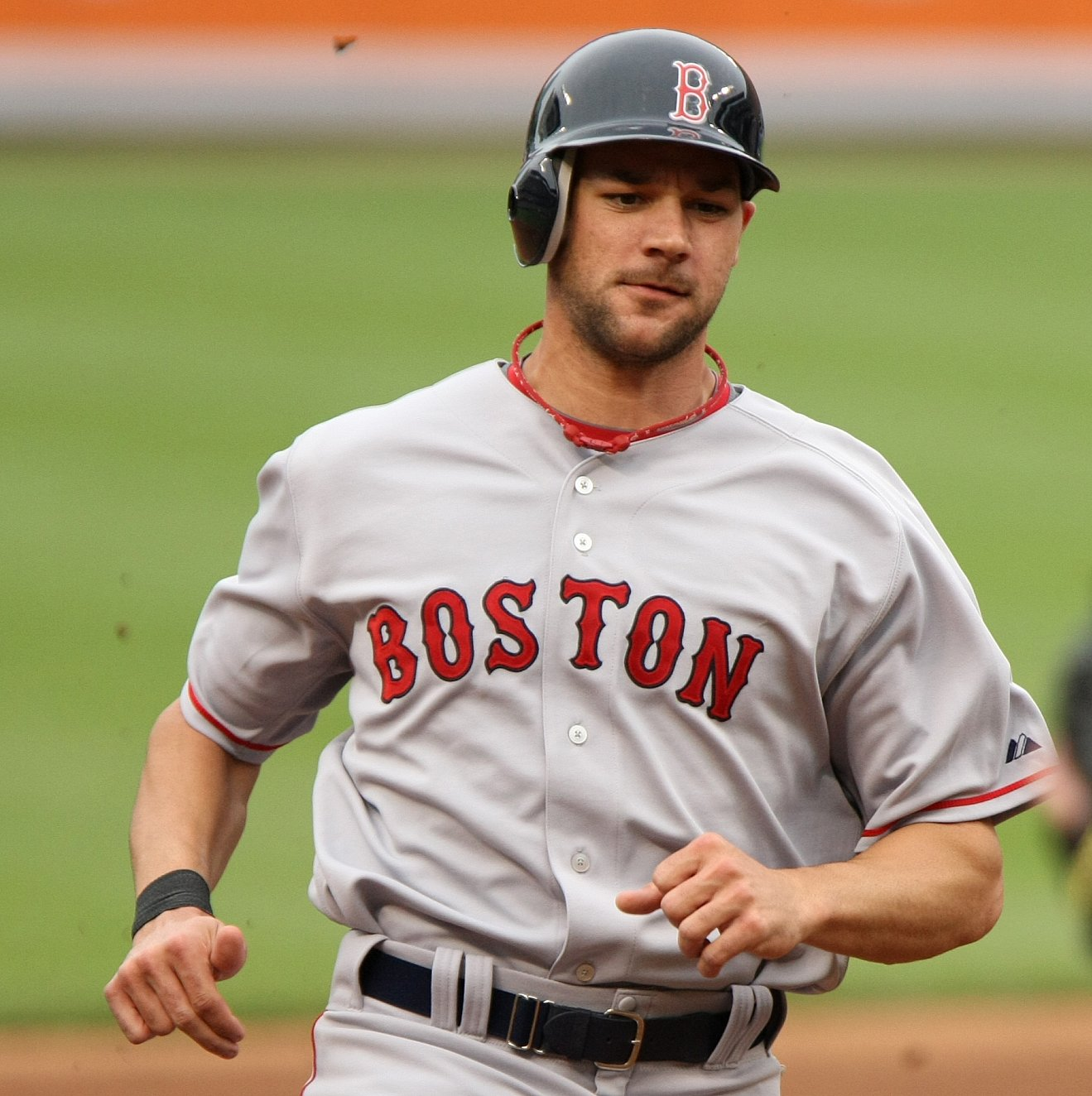
Van Every with the Boston Red Sox.

Van Every hit his first career home run on April 29, 2009 at Progressive Field against the Cleveland Indians. The solo shot during the top of the 10th inning turned out to be the winning hit as the Red Sox went on to win the game 6–5. The following day on April 30, Van Every pitched the final 2/3 of the eighth inning in a 13–0 loss to the Tampa Bay Rays. On July 8, Van Every was designated for assignment by the Red Sox to make room on the 40-man roster for Jed Lowrie, who was activated off the 60-day disabled list. On July 18, he was released by the Red Sox, after the 10 days of his waiver period expired.

=== Pittsburgh Pirates ===
On July 29, 2009, Van Every was signed by the Pittsburgh Pirates as a minor league free agent, and he was assigned to the Triple-A Indianapolis Indians. Knee surgery prevented Van Every from appearing for the Pirates organization.

=== Boston Red Sox (second stint) ===
On April 24, 2010, Van Every was traded back to the Boston Red Sox in exchange for a player to be named later. On May 8, in a game against the New York Yankees in which Boston would go on to lose 14–3, Van Every pitched for the second time in his career, striking out one batter, and giving up a two-run home run to Mark Teixeira. In a game against the Baltimore Orioles, he hit a solo home run in a game in which the Red Sox would lose. On May 22, he was designated for assignment by the Red Sox to clear roster space for the returning Jacoby Ellsbury.

=== Pittsburgh Pirates (second stint) ===
On May 31, 2010, the Red Sox traded Van Every to the Pittsburgh Pirates in exchange for catching prospect Josue Peley. He was assigned to the Triple–A Indianapolis Indians, where he hit .214 with 10 home runs in 74 games.

=== Washington Nationals ===
In December 2010, Van Every signed with the Washington Nationals organization. He was released prior to the 2011 season.

=== St. Paul Saints ===
Van Every signed with the St. Paul Saints of the American Association of Independent Professional Baseball and played for them during the 2011 season. In 85 appearances for the Saints, he slashed .265/.358/.517 with 19 home runs, 50 RBI, and one stolen base.

== Personal life ==
Van Every earned his bachelor's degree in business administration from the University of Southern Mississippi in the fall of 2013. He currently resides in Nashville with his wife Morgan. As of 2019, he serves as the volunteer Director of Operations for the College of the Holy Cross baseball team in Worcester, MA.
