= Hunter Jones =

American baseball player (born 1984)

- Pitcher
- Born: January 10, 1984 (age 42); Palm Beach Gardens, Florida, U.S.
- Batted: Left Threw: Left

MLB debut
- April 20, 2009, for the Boston Red Sox

Last appearance
- May 6, 2010, for the Florida Marlins

MLB statistics
- Win–loss record: 0–0
- Earned run average: 8.16
- Strikeouts: 12
- Stats at Baseball Reference

Teams
- Boston Red Sox (2009); Florida Marlins (2010)

David Hunter Jones (born January 10, 1984) is an American former professional baseball pitcher. He played in Major League Baseball (MLB) for the Boston Red Sox in 2009 and the Florida Marlins in 2010.

== Amateur career ==
Jones played college baseball at Florida State University in 2004 and 2005, but missed much playing time due to a fractured arm. Jones had successful surgery but went undrafted. In 2005, he played collegiate summer baseball with the Orleans Cardinals of the Cape Cod Baseball League.

== Professional career ==
=== Boston Red Sox ===
Jones signed as a free agent with the Boston Redsox and spent 2005–2009 in their minor league system. Jones was called up on April 15, 2009 and five days later made his major league debut against the Baltimore Orioles.

=== Florida Marlins ===
On November 5, 2009, Jones was traded to the Florida Marlins with minor league pitcher Jose Alvarez for Jeremy Hermida. The Florida Marlins released Jones on June 22, 2010 and he spent the rest of the season recovering from Tommy John surgery after a June 5 injury.

After rehabbing for the entire 2011 MLB season, Jones played winterball for the Aguilas del Zulia in the Venezuelan Professional Baseball League (Liga Venezolana de Béisbol Profesional) for the 2011–2012 season.

=== Second Stint with the Red Sox ===
On February 23, 2012 Jones signed a minor league deal with the Red Sox and was seen by reporters at the Red Sox spring training facility in Fort Myers, Florida. He was later cut by the Red Sox and signed by the Laredo Lemurs of the American Association of Independent Professional Baseball.

=== Southern Maryland Blue Crabs ===
Jones spent the second half of the 2012 season pitching for the Southern Maryland Blue Crabs helping them reach the playoffs.

=== Bridgeport Bluefish ===
Jones pitched for the Bridgeport Bluefish of the Atlantic League of Professional Baseball in 2014.

== Pitching ==
Jones throws a 92–96 miles per hour fastball and an 89–93 miles per hour two-seam fastball. He used to throw a circle changeup and a curveball but in 2007 he stopped throwing the changeup and the curveball developed into a slider which almost acts like a slurve. He has had good success versus righties.
