= Sean McAdam (journalist) =

American sports journalist

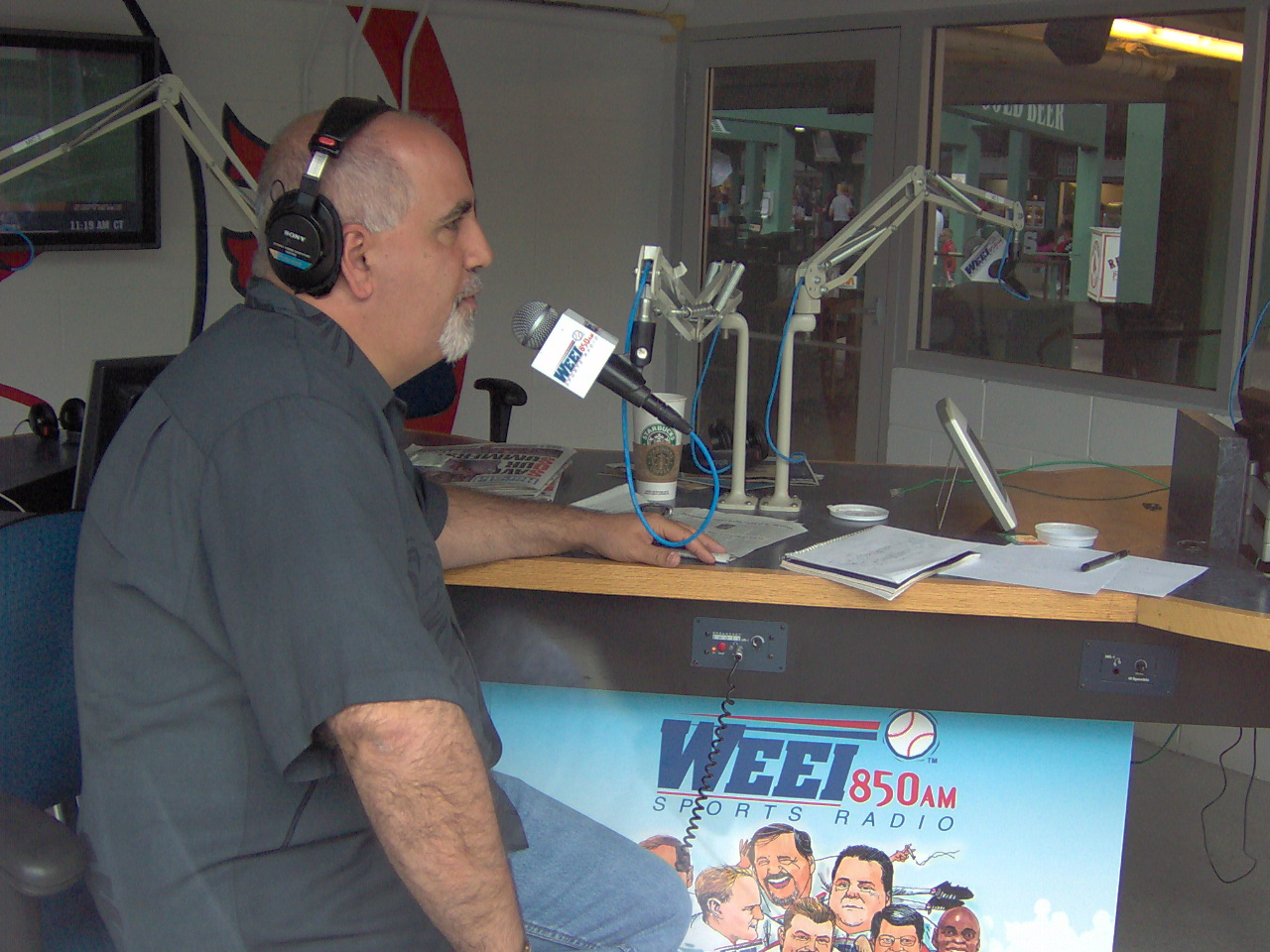
Sean McAdam on WEEI

Sean McAdam is a sports writer and author from the Boston area. He covers the Boston Red Sox for Boston Sports Journal and is a radio and television analyst and commentator. His first book, Boston: America's Best Sports Town, was released in April 2018.

McAdam is a member of the Baseball Writers' Association of America and is eligible to vote in Baseball Hall of Fame balloting.

Before joining Boston Sports Journal, McAdam covered local sports for outlets including FoxSports.com, CSNNE.com, and The Boston Herald, in addition to The Providence Journal and ESPN.com.

== Sports Writing ==
Following his graduation from Providence College in 1981, McAdam spent four years covering sports at WEAN, a Rhode Island radio talk station, before joining The Providence Journal as a reporter. After 23 years with The Journal, with most of that tenure covering the Red Sox beat, he left to take a similar position with The Herald in October 2008.

McAdam resigned from ESPN.com to join FoxSports.com in May 2009.

== Broadcasting ==
McAdam made regular appearances on WEEI-FM sports talk radio in Boston. He was a co-host on the Big Show (weekdays 2–6 p.m.) and he co-hosted The Baseball Show with ex-major leaguer Lou Merloni and colleagues Steve Buckley and Rob Bradford (Sundays 9–12 p.m.).

Since 2004, Sean has also been a guest analyst during Red Sox pregame and discussion shows on NESN, the team's satellite channel. On April 10, 2009, he filled for the ill Jerry Remy as a color commentator, working in the NESN booth alongside Don Orsillo for the first two innings of Boston's 6–3 loss to the Los Angeles Angels in Anaheim, California.

== Author ==
McAdam wrote Boston: America's Best Sports Town, a book that chronicles the rich history of Boston sports. The book, published by Press Box Books, was released in April 2018 to coincide with the beginning of the Red Sox's season. With a foreword written by former Red Sox ace Pedro Martinez, Boston: America's Best Sports Town covers the history of the city's major pro and college sports teams, as well as local traditions such as the Boston Marathon and the Beanpot.

== Personal ==
McAdam went to Chelmsford High School in Chelmsford, Massachusetts and is a member of the Chelmsford High School Alumni Association Hall of Fame and was inducted in 2010. McAdam resides in Littleton, Massachusetts.
