= Jed Lowrie =

American baseball player (born 1984)

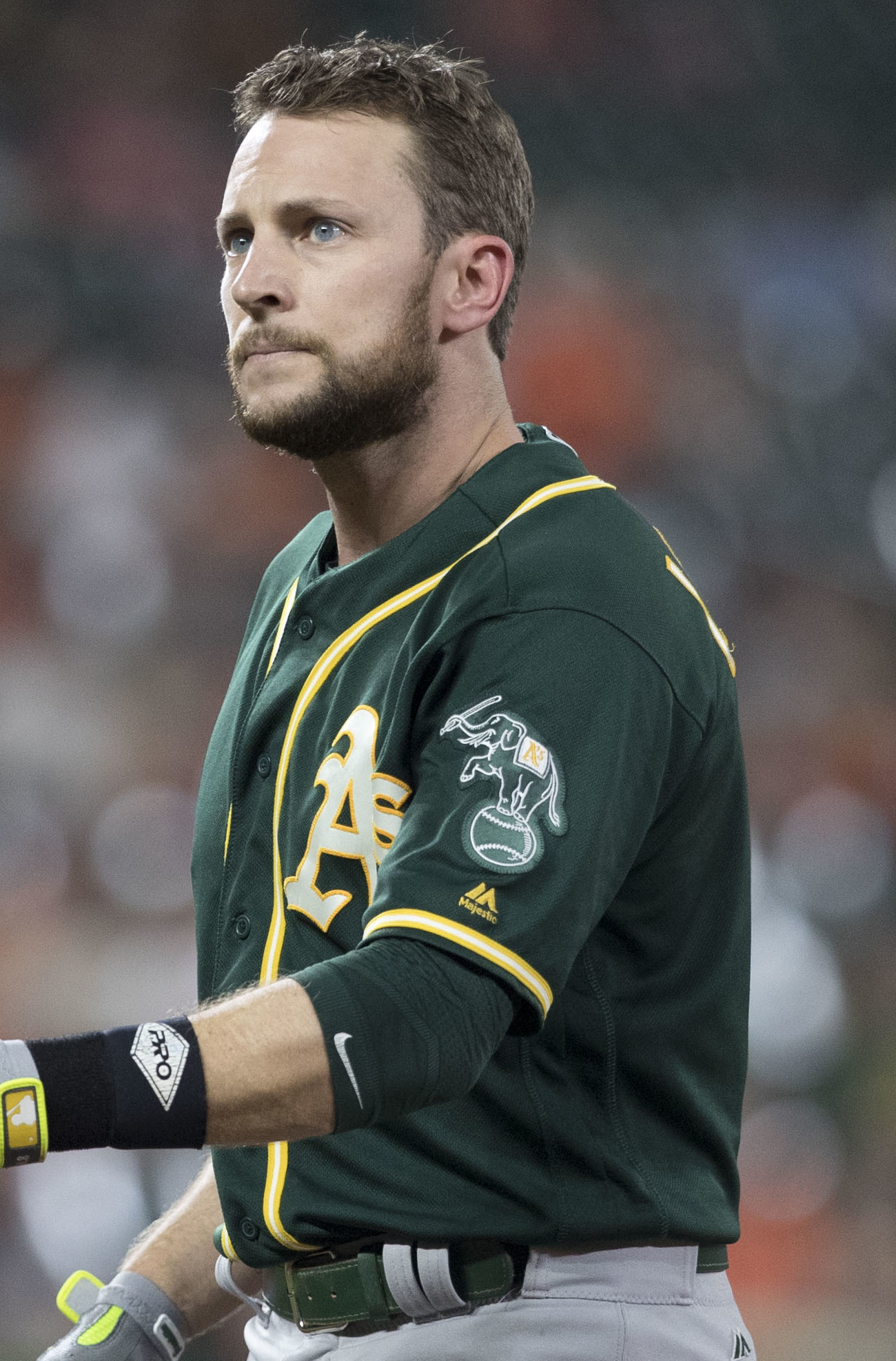
- Lowrie with the Athletics in 2017
- Infielder
- Born: April 17, 1984 (age 42); Salem, Oregon, U.S.
- Batted: Switch Threw: Right

MLB debut
- April 15, 2008, for the Boston Red Sox

Last MLB appearance
- August 7, 2022, for the Oakland Athletics

MLB statistics
- Batting average: .257
- Home runs: 121
- Runs batted in: 594
- Stats at Baseball Reference

Teams
- Boston Red Sox (2008–2011); Houston Astros (2012); Oakland Athletics (2013–2014); Houston Astros (2015); Oakland Athletics (2016–2018); New York Mets (2019); Oakland Athletics (2021–2022)

Career highlights and awards
- All-Star (2018)
Medals
Men's baseball
Representing United States
World University Championship
Gold medal – first place	2004 Tainan	Team

Jed Carlson Lowrie (born April 17, 1984) is an American former professional baseball infielder. He played 14 seasons in Major League Baseball (MLB) for the Boston Red Sox, Houston Astros, Oakland Athletics, and New York Mets.

== Early life ==
Lowrie was born on April 17, 1984, in Salem, Oregon, and later attended North Salem High School. In 2004, while playing for the Stanford University Cardinal baseball team, Lowrie earned Pacific-10 Conference Player of the Year honors. He was a First Team All-American in 2004 and 2005. At Stanford, future major league outfielders Sam Fuld, John Mayberry Jr., and Carlos Quentin were among Lowrie's teammates.

== Professional career ==
=== Boston Red Sox ===
From 2005 through 2007, Lowrie played for Boston at three different minor league levels. During the 2007 season, he made the Eastern League All-Star team, was named the Portland Sea Dogs' Most Valuable Player, and the Red Sox Minor League Offensive Player of the Year. He was promoted to the Pawtucket Red Sox of the Class AAA International League late in the season.

Lowrie was called up from the minor leagues on April 10, 2008, after Mike Lowell was placed on the disabled list (DL). He made his debut on April 15, driving home three runs in a 5–3 victory in Cleveland.

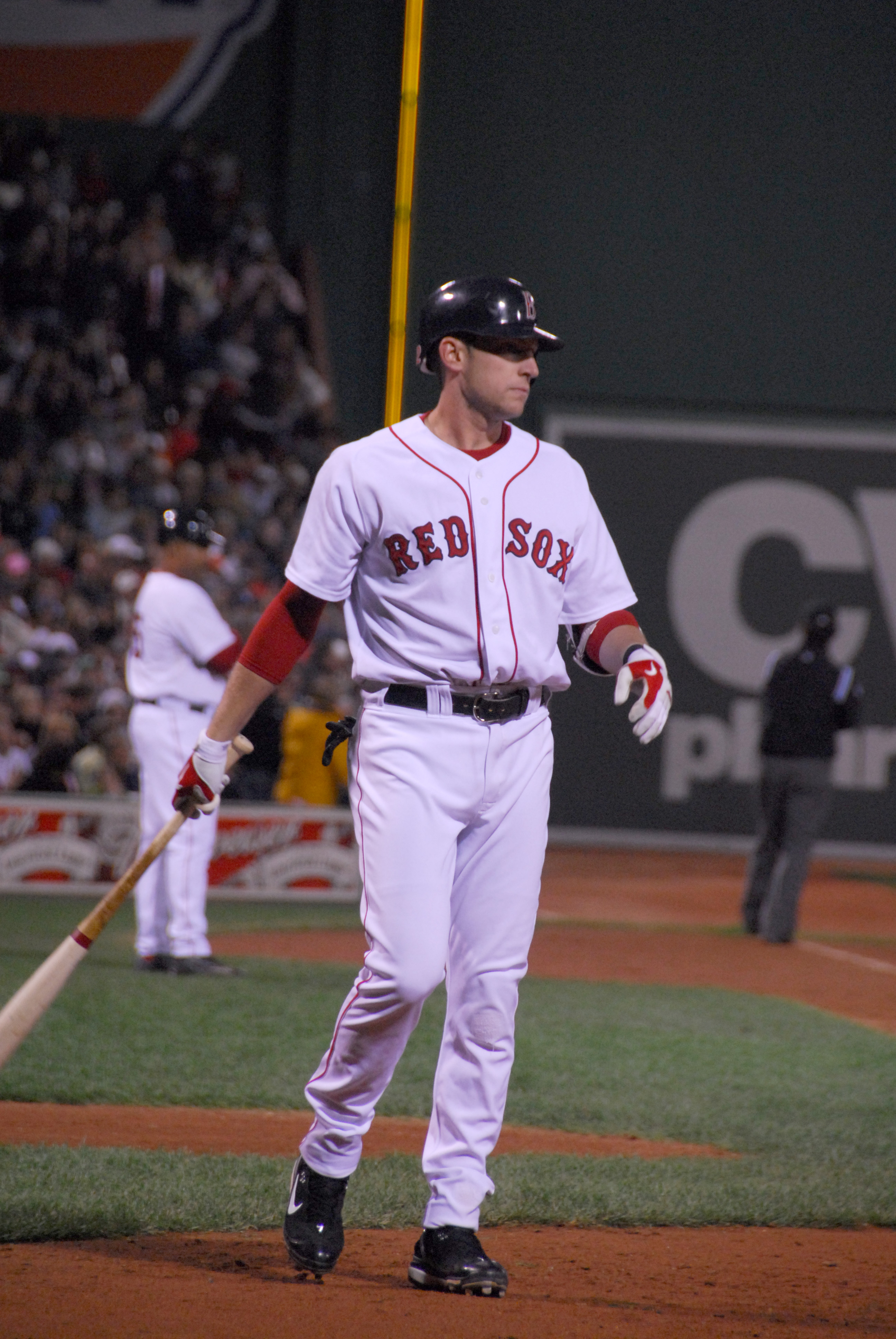
Lowrie with the Boston Red Sox in 2008

Lowrie was called up to replace Julio Lugo when he went on the DL. On August 1, 2008, in teammate Jason Bay's first game on the Red Sox, Lowrie hit a game winning infield single in the 12th inning to knock in Bay with the decisive run and upend the Oakland Athletics, 2–1. Lowrie was responsible for the other Red Sox run in that game, as a sacrifice fly in the second inning allowed Bay to score from third. On August 24, he hit his second home run of the season, a game-winner, as the Sox won 6–5. He committed no errors in 49 games played at shortstop during the regular season, and played regularly in the 2008 postseason as one of Boston's two starting shortstops. Lowrie hit his first major league home run against the Twins inside the Metrodome. On October 6, 2008, Lowrie drove in the series-winning run against the Los Angeles Angels of Anaheim.

Lowrie's pre-season grand slam on April 4, 2009, was the first major league home run at Citi Field. During the 2009 regular season, Lowrie appeared in five games for Boston before landing on the 15-day disabled list with a left wrist sprain on April 13, retroactive to April 12. On April 21, the switch-hitter underwent an ulnar styloid excision and arthroscopic ligament repair on his left wrist performed by Dr. Donald Sheridan which landed him on the 60-day disabled list. Lowrie began a minor league rehab assignment on June 21 and on July 8 the Red Sox activated him from the 60-day DL. Lowrie came off the DL July 18. However, on August 8, he was placed on the disabled list again with ulnar neuritis in his left wrist. On September 8, he was re-activated from the DL when the Red Sox expanded their 40-man roster. In his first game back against the Blue Jays in Toronto he hit a home run batting right-handed. On October 4, he hit his first career grand slam against the Cleveland Indians.

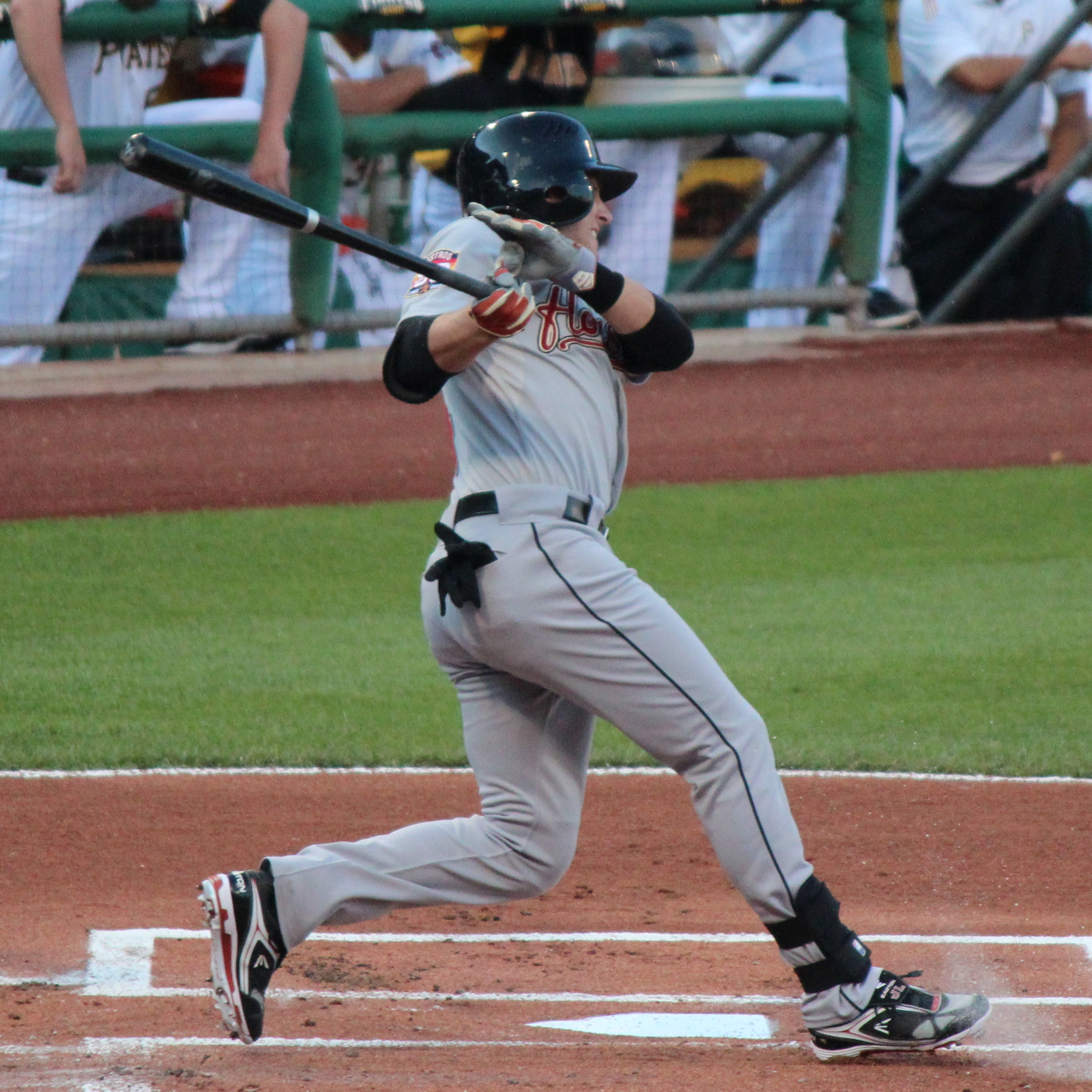
Lowrie batting for the Houston Astros in 2012

During spring training, Lowrie suffered from mononucleosis, and as a result, he missed the start of the season. He made his season debut on July 21, 2010 against the Oakland Athletics. On August 21, 2010, he hit a walk-off home run against the Toronto Blue Jays in the 11th inning off of Casey Janssen. He also made his debut as a first baseman during the 2010 season, initially as a late-innings replacement for Mike Lowell; the Red Sox planned to give him opportunities to start at first base in the future. During the final weeks of the season, he had the first multi-home run games of his career, hitting two home runs against the Seattle Mariners on September 14, followed by two more home runs against the Yankees in the season's final game. Although having less than 200 PA's during the 2010 season, Lowrie's productivity was still substantial; his .904 OPS ranked behind only Troy Tulowitzki among all MLB shortstops.

Entering 2011, needing to contend with shortstop Marco Scutaro for the starting shortstop position in the Red Sox lineup, Lowrie began the season on a tear, hitting .516 through his first 31 at-bats. On April 18, 2011, he went 4-for-5 with a home run and 4 RBIs. On August 16, 2011, Lowrie started a triple play with help of Dustin Pedroia and Adrián González against the Tampa Bay Rays.

=== Houston Astros ===
On December 14, 2011, he was traded along with Kyle Weiland to the Houston Astros for reliever Mark Melancon.

Lowrie was about to head to an arbitration hearing, but he and the Astros agreed on a one-year, $1.15 million deal with bonuses for performance and awards on February 8, 2012. He filed for $1.5 million, but the Astros countered with $900,000. Had Lowrie gone to a hearing, he would not have had bonuses in his contract.

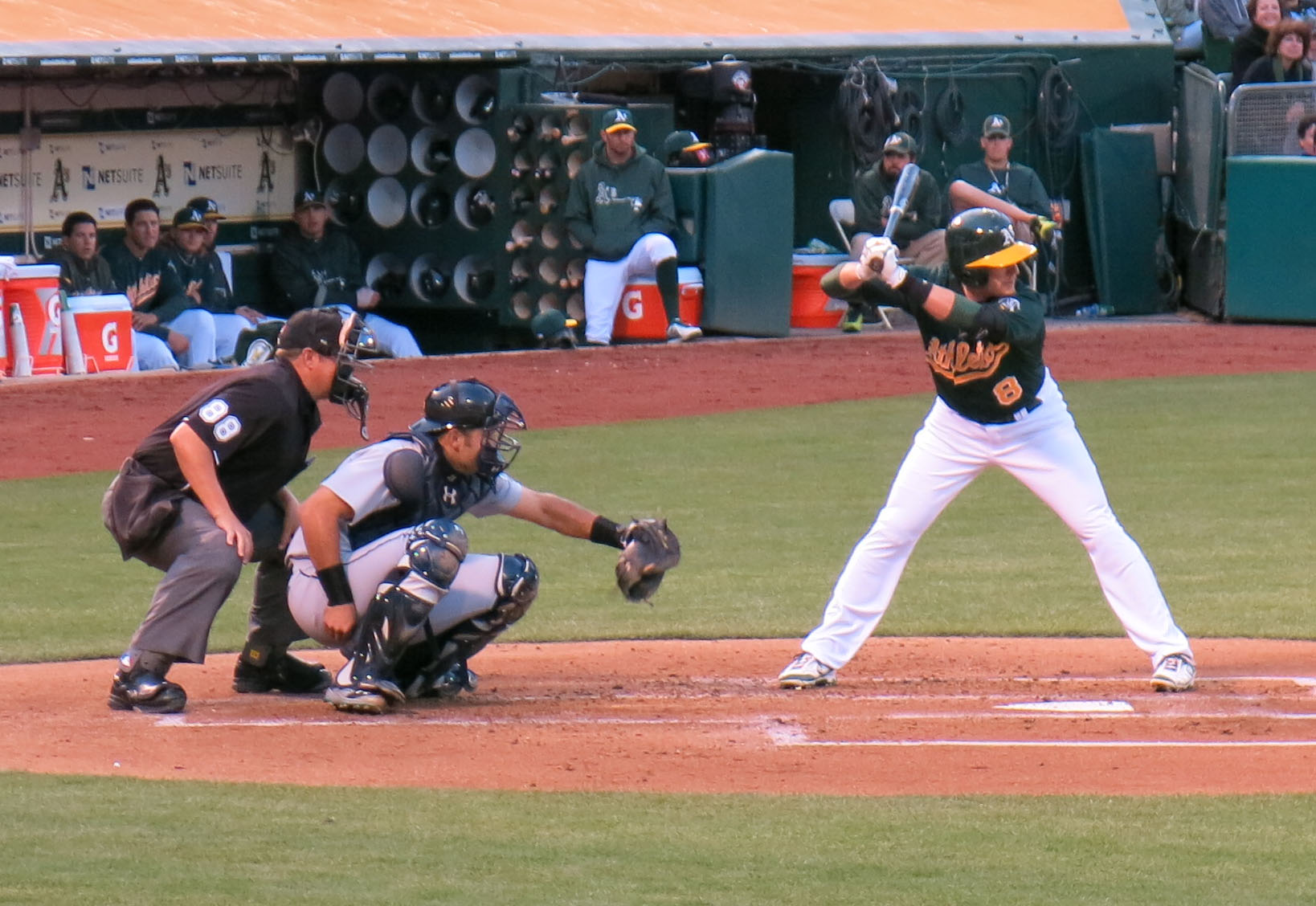
Lowrie batting for the Oakland Athletics in 2013

=== Oakland Athletics ===
The Astros on February 4, 2013 traded Lowrie and Fernando Rodriguez to the Oakland Athletics for Chris Carter, Brad Peacock, and Max Stassi. The trade reunited him with former Red Sox teammate Josh Reddick.

Lowrie was initially expected to play second base, but due to the struggles and injury of shortstop Hiroyuki Nakajima, Lowrie was placed at shortstop, and was the regular starter there throughout the 2013 season.

Lowrie continued as Oakland's starting shortstop during the 2014 season. On August 4, Lowrie broke his right index finger while fielding a ground ball—after attempting to play through the injury, Lowrie went to the disabled list on August 15. He was hitting a career-low .238 with five home runs.

=== Second stint with Astros ===
The Astros announced on December 15, 2014, that they had agreed to a three-year contract with Lowrie. There was a club option for a fourth year. The deal was worth as much as $28 million. Astros general manager Jeff Luhnow said that Lowrie fit well with one of the main objectives for the 2015 Astros, which was to improve the defensive skills of the team's infield.

Some teams had explored signing Lowrie to play second base or third base. The Astros had a need at his preferred position, shortstop, though minor league prospect and shortstop Carlos Correa had a chance to make the major league team at some point during the 2015 season. Astros leadership had said that Correa will stay at shortstop; Astros beat writer Evan Drellich predicted that Lowrie might move to third base if Correa were called up to the major leagues. This did in fact occur, with Correa being promoted early in the year, which resulted in him winning AL Rookie of the Year.

=== Second stint with Athletics ===
On November 25, 2015, Lowrie was traded back to the Athletics for minor league pitcher Brendan McCurry. After the Athletics acquired shortstop Marcus Semien in a trade with the White Sox, Lowrie moved to second base. His 2015 season was cut short due to numerous injuries, allowing him to play in 69 games only. His 2016 season would be cut short due to injury as well, as he was diagnosed with a season ending toe injury, ending his season short to 87 games. In 2017, Lowrie set a new Oakland record for most doubles in a season, with 49.

On July 10, 2018, owning a .288 batting average with 16 home runs and 62 RBI, Lowrie was named as an All-Star for the first time in his career, replacing injured Gleyber Torres on the team. On August 12, 2018, Lowrie recorded hit number 1,000 against the Los Angeles Angels in Anaheim with a double in the first inning. Lowrie would later hit his 100th career home run against Félix Hernández of the Seattle Mariners in Oakland on August 14, 2018, in the form of a two-run homer.

=== New York Mets ===
On January 10, 2019, Lowrie signed a two-year deal with the New York Mets. He was placed on the disabled list to begin the season with a knee sprain. Ultimately, Lowrie saw 7 pinch-hit at-bats in 2019 with one walk and no hits. He saw no field time that season.

Lowrie later stated that he wished to have knee surgery, but the Mets denied his request, and Lowrie alleged that the Mets threatened to void his contract if he went forward with it.

Lowrie did not appear in a game with the Mets in 2020 and became a free agent after the year, at which point he went forward with successful knee surgery.

=== Third stint with the Athletics ===
On February 10, 2021, Lowrie signed a minor league deal with the Oakland Athletics with an invitation to Spring Training. On April 1, 2021, Lowrie was selected to the 40-man roster.

On March 27, 2022, Lowrie signed a one-year contract to remain with the Athletics.

On August 10, 2022, Lowrie was designated for assignment. He was released the next day.

On March 23, 2023, Lowrie announced his retirement from professional baseball via his Instagram account where he wrote: “To every organization, that believed in me and gave me the opportunity to play, and to the fans in Boston, Houston, New York, and Oakland, it wasn’t always perfect, but I gave my all and I’m grateful for the opportunity to play for you. Thank you... Love never dies though, so I look forward to new opportunities in the game.”

== Personal life ==
Lowrie and his wife Milessa have a daughter and a son. Lowrie collects wines and has a collection of "several hundred bottles" in his home in Salem.

Following his retirement, Lowrie told the San Francisco Chronicle that he intended to spend more time with his family to include serving as an assistant coach for his daughter’s softball team.
