= 2009 Tampa Bay Rays season =

2009 Tampa Bay Rays
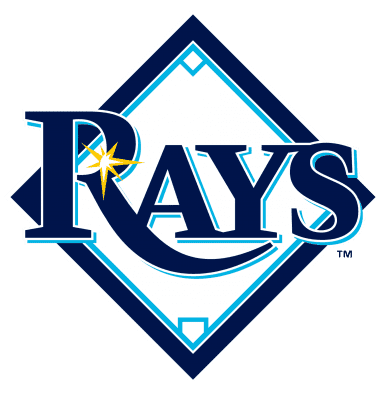
- League: American League
- Division: East
- Ballpark: Tropicana Field
- City: St. Petersburg, Florida
- Record: 84–78 (.519)
- Divisional place: 3rd
- Owners: Stuart Sternberg
- General managers: Andrew Friedman (de facto)
- Managers: Joe Maddon
- Television: FS Florida; Sun Sports; Dewayne Staats, Todd Kalas, Kevin Kennedy, Brian Anderson
- Radio: Tampa Bay Rays Radio Network (English); Andy Freed, Todd Kalas, Dave Wills, Rich Herrera; WGES (Spanish)

The Tampa Bay Rays' 2009 season was their 12th season of baseball on the Gulf Coast of Florida. The team attempted to defend their American League Championship they won in the previous season. Although they missed the playoffs, they still finished with a winning record (84–78) – only the second in franchise history.

== Summary ==
=== Offseason ===
For the most part, the Rays' main roster remained intact. Eric Hinske's contract expired at the end of the 2008 season, and the team did not exercise options on Rocco Baldelli, Cliff Floyd or Trever Miller, making all four free agents. None were offered salary arbitration. In addition, Jonny Gomes was non-tendered on December 12, 2008, making him a free agent as well.

During the offseason, starting pitcher Edwin Jackson was traded to the Detroit Tigers for corner outfielder and Tampa native Matt Joyce. Prior to that, the Rays also considered a trade with the Florida Marlins for corner outfielder Jeremy Hermida, but declined to make a deal. They also considered trading with the Minnesota Twins to re-acquire center fielder Delmon Young, whom they traded (along with Brendan Harris) to the Twins in the 2007–08 offseason for Matt Garza and Jason Bartlett.

The Rays signed relief pitcher Joe Nelson to a one-year, $1.3-million deal on December 30.

The Rays had discussions with free agents for a designated hitter, including Jason Giambi, Bobby Abreu and Milton Bradley. They also considered re-signing Baldelli as a full-time DH. However, on January 5, 2009, they signed ex-Phillie left fielder Pat Burrell to a two-year deal worth $16 million.

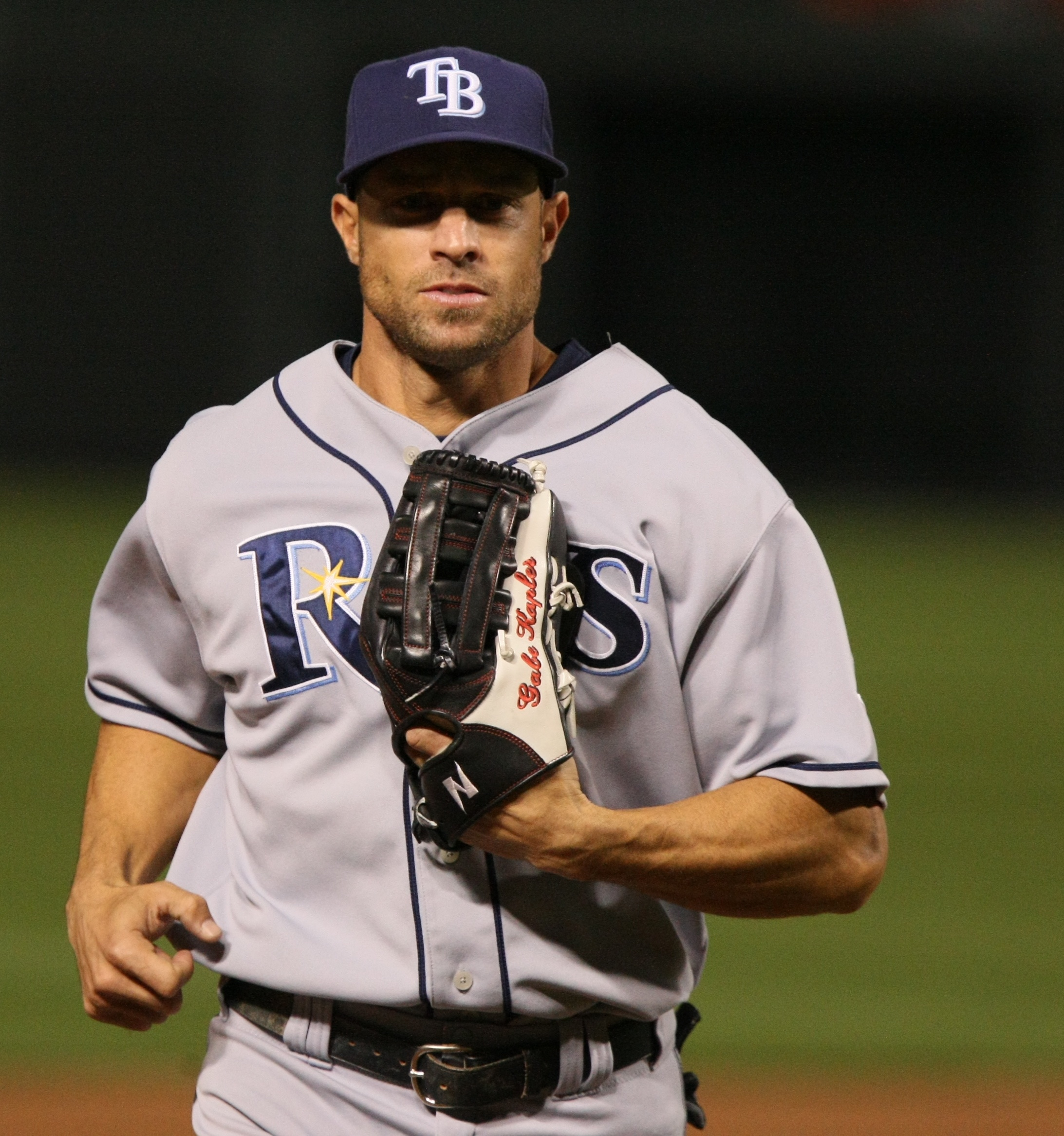
Gabe Kapler

On January 12, outfielder Gabe Kapler was signed to a one-year, $1-million deal.

On February 17, free agent infielder Adam Kennedy was signed to a minor-league contract and invited to spring training.

The only player who was eligible for salary arbitration that went to a hearing was catcher Dioner Navarro. He lost his hearing on February 10, and was given $2.1 million for 2009; he sought $2.5 million. Two players avoided arbitration: shortstop Jason Bartlett, who signed a one-year contract just short of $2 million on January 20; and Willy Aybar, who signed a two-year deal with an option for 2011 worth up to $4.5 million on February 18.

Matt Garza, Andy Sonnanstine and B. J. Upton all had their contracts renewed, and the Rays signed 15 other players on February 25.

At the end of spring training, starting pitcher Jason Hammel was traded to the Colorado Rockies for pitching prospect Aneury Rodríguez. Jeff Niemann joined James Shields, Scott Kazmir, Matt Garza and Andy Sonnanstine in the starting rotation to begin the season, as David Price was optioned to Triple-A Durham.

=== Organizational changes ===
Quality control coach Tim Bogar was hired by the Boston Red Sox to be their first base coach. Todd Greene signed on to replace Bogar in Tampa Bay.

The Rays unveiled a new third jersey to be used in 2009, which is a dark blue shirt with the Rays logo. The color is similar to the main color of their batting practice jersey, but without the different-colored panels on the sides. The manta ray logo will not appear on the alternate jersey.

The team's spring training operations will move from St. Petersburg to the rebuilt Charlotte County Stadium in Port Charlotte. Previously, they used Al Lang Field in St. Petersburg for spring training, and the Vince Naimoli Sports Complex for extended spring training.

Charlotte County Stadium will also be home of their Advanced-A Florida State League minor league franchise, the former "Vero Beach Devil Rays", who will be renamed to the Charlotte Stone Crabs. In addition, their regular Class A franchise in the South Atlantic League will move from Columbus, Georgia, to Bowling Green, Kentucky, and become the Bowling Green Hot Rods. Their Appalachian League Rookie-class team, previously known as the "Princeton Devil Rays", will become known as the Princeton Rays, excising the "Devil" from the name and adopting the team colors and typeface after previously using the green-based color scheme from 2001, and the original typeface from 1998. The only minor league teams that will not change are the Double-A Montgomery Biscuits and the Short-A Hudson Valley Renegades.

The Rays will also open a second Rookie-class team in the Gulf Coast League, the Gulf Coast Rays, which will also play at Charlotte County Stadium.

=== Media changes ===
Fox Sports Florida will take over the entire television contract, the beginning of an eight-year exclusive contract, and will broadcast 75 games, with another 75 games broadcast on sister network Sun Sports. It is unknown how much of the schedule will be broadcast in HD. Some cable networks have not begun to air games that are on Sun Sports, because of a disagreement on what fees the networks will pay the station for the games. The companies still in dispute will not broadcast games airing on Sun Sports.

Dewayne Staats returned as the play-by-play announcer, but Joe Magrane moved to MLB Network. On February 16, it was made official that Kevin Kennedy would split time in the booth with Brian Anderson, as well as Todd Kalas, who is currently the Rays' pre-, post- and in-game host.

At least five games will appear as Saturday afternoon games nationally on MLB on Fox: May 9 at Boston, May 16 hosting Cleveland, May 30 hosting Minnesota, June 20 at the New York Mets, and August 29 at Detroit. The May 10 game at Boston aired on ESPN's Sunday Night Baseball, just the second time the Rays appeared on the premier primetime package. More games may be moved to national coverage during the season. The season opener at Boston on April 6 was scheduled to air on ESPN, but was postponed to the next day, April 7, and the rescheduled game was not picked up by ESPN. The July 5 game at Texas aired on ESPN's Sunday Night Baseball.

620 WDAE was announced as the new radio flagship. Sister station 1250 WHNZ had been the previous flagship station since 2005, but WDAE aired some Monday night games in 2008. Andy Freed and Dave Wills will return to do play-by-play with Rich Herrera serving as pre- and post-game host. All three will be in their fifth season with the team, after replacing the team's original radio announcers, Paul Olden and Charlie Slowes, after the 2004 season.

== Regular season ==
=== April ===
The Rays began their American League title defense on the road against division rival Boston. Before a pitch was even thrown, the Rays already had a franchise first. Their scheduled Opening Day was postponed due to inclement weather, making it the first time that the first game of the season for the Rays had been postponed. After dropping the rescheduled season opener the following day, the Rays ended up winning the next two games of the series. This was the first opening series win for the Rays since 2002, when they swept the Detroit Tigers in a 3-game set.

The Rays came home after splitting their first two series, opening Tropicana Field against the New York Yankees, and raising their American League East and AL Championship banners on April 13. B. J. Upton returned to the team having started the season on the disabled list. There was also a moment of silence held for Harry Kalas, Phillies radio announcer and father of Rays television analyst Todd Kalas, who died earlier in the day. The Rays won their home opener, 15–5.

Matt Garza lost a bid for a perfect game in the 7th inning against the Boston Red Sox when Jacoby Ellsbury hit an infield single. Retiring the first 18 batters, this was the furthest any Ray pitcher had taken a perfect game, as well as the first time any Ray pitcher had retired 18 batters consecutively.

Evan Longoria, with a .369 batting average, 6 home runs, a tie for the American League lead in RBI with 24, and a slugging percentage of .714, was awarded with the Player of the Month award for the American League. This was the first time a member of the Rays had won the award.

The Rays finished the month 9–14, and were 5 1/2 games behind first place. They had not won a series since the opening series in Boston. Their longest win streak was two, which occurred twice.

=== May ===
On May 3, Carl Crawford set a team record and tied a modern-day league record with six stolen bases. The last player to steal six bases was Eric Young while he was a member of the Colorado Rockies on June 30, 1996. It was only the fifth time since 1912 that a player had stolen that many bases, which was also the last year it had happened in the American League. After the game Crawford stated that he didn't know he had tied a record, or else he would have made an attempt for seven.

On May 15, the Rays trailed the Cleveland Indians 7–0 after the top of the 4th inning, but would rally to score eight unanswered runs over the remainder of the game to win, capped off by a walk-off home run by B. J. Upton to lead off the bottom of the 9th inning. At the time, this was the largest come from behind win in franchise history, but remains the largest deficit overcome at home. Previously, the Rays had never won a game in which they had trailed by at least seven runs. They had come back from a six-run deficit on five occasions.

Prior to a game against the Cleveland Indians on May 17, Rays manager Joe Maddon incorrectly filled out a lineup card that listed Evan Longoria and Ben Zobrist both as the third baseman. As the plan was to have Zobrist play the position at third base and have Longoria as the designated hitter, having them both as the third baseman left the Rays without a player listed as the designated hitter in their official lineup card. As stated in part of Rule 6.10(b) in the official rulebook of the league, "It is not mandatory that a club designate a hitter for the pitcher, but failure to do so prior to the game precludes the use of a Designated Hitter for that game." Indians manager Eric Wedge brought the error to the attention of the umpires at the beginning of the bottom of the first inning. Because there was no designated hitter, and since Zobrist had already taken the field as the third baseman, the Rays would have to use starting pitcher Andy Sonnanstine as the third batter in the lineup where Longoria would normally bat. Longoria would enter the game later, in the seventh inning as a triple-switch when Sonnanstine was relieved from the game, moving Zobrist to right field in place of Gabe Kapler and shifting the pitcher's spot to seventh. Almost a week after the game, MLB umpiring vice president Mike Port stated that the umpires were wrong in allowing Longoria to come into the game at any point after it began. The Rays ultimately won the game, 7–5. Sonnanstine went 1-for-3 with an RBI double.

On May 22, the Rays placed Troy Percival and Scott Kazmir on the 15-day disabled list, and called up infielder Reid Brignac and relief pitcher Dale Thayer. The move left the Rays with four starting pitchers, suggesting another move may be made later on to fill the vacant starting role later on.

The Rays lost starting second baseman Akinori Iwamura for the season to a leg injury that occurred on May 24 against the Florida Marlins. While Iwamura was making an effort to turn a double play, Marlins infielder Chris Coghlan awkwardly slid into Iwamura's leg in an attempt to disrupt the throw to first base. Iwamura fell to the ground and had to be taken off the field on a cart. The next day after an MRI, it was announced that he suffered a torn ACL, "involvement" on the MCL, in addition to torn ligaments in his ankle. Even before the announcement was made, hopes of a speedy recovery were not promising, as Iwamura was seen around the clubhouse on crutches "saying goodbye", and as Rays shortstop Jason Bartlett put it, "From what I heard, he's not going to be back soon." Bartlett himself would be put on the disabled list one day later, with a sprained ankle.

David Price, the team's first overall pick in the 2007 MLB draft, made his season debut on the road against the Cleveland Indians on May 25. After 100 pitches in 3 1/3 innings, Price was taken out of the game.

On the same night as Price's first start of the 2009 season, the Rays jumped out to a 10–0 lead over the Indians, but were unable to win the game, as their opponents rallied for 11 unanswered runs. The Rays allowed 7 runs to cross the plate in the bottom of the 9th inning, ended by a walk-off 2-run single by Víctor Martínez. The Indians scored their last five runs with two outs, as the game's last six batters reached base. This having been the first of a 4-game set for the Rays on the road, the Indians eventually won every game in the series, extending the Rays' losing streak for road games against Cleveland to 17 games. The last time the Rays won in Cleveland was September 28, 2005.

At the end of May, the Rays were 25–28, 4th place in the division, and 5 1/2 games out of first place. They were 5 games behind first place for the Wild Card.

=== June ===
On June 22, Akinori Iwamura underwent surgery to repair the injuries suffered the month before. It was discovered that his ACL was only partially torn, meaning he would not require reconstructive surgery. Instead, an arthroscopic surgery was performed, and a report on the successful operation stated that he could return in 6–8 weeks.

On June 28, the Rays became the fastest team to hit 100 home runs and steal 100 bases in a single season, needing only 77 games. They were the fifth to do it before the all-star break, and the first since the Florida Marlins in 2003 to do so.

The Rays would go 19–7 in the month, improving their overall record to 44–35, and riding a seven-game winning streak into July. They set a new franchise record for home runs in one month with 41. While not having gained much ground on the division lead, finishing the month 4 games behind, in the wild card race, they went into July only 1 1/2 games behind.

Carlos Peña led the American League in home runs at the end of June with 23, which was third best in the entire league.

For the second time in the season, a Rays player was named the American League's Player of the Month. B. J. Upton, with a .324 batting average, 5 home runs, 22 RBI, 10 doubles, a .562 slugging percentage, a .395 on-base percentage, and league best 14 stolen bases, won the award this time.

=== July ===
Unfortunately the Rays' winning streak did not carry over into the next month. They lost their first four games in July, including being swept on the road by the Texas Rangers, and did not win until their first home game of the month. By the All-Star break, the Rays were 48–41. They were 6 1/2 games behind first place in the division, and 3 1/2 behind for the Wild Card.

Four Rays were selected to make the All-Star Game. Evan Longoria, after having to rely on the All-Star Final Vote to take the final spot on the roster in his rookie year in 2008, was elected as the starting 3rd baseman by the fans. Longoria had the third highest votes out of players in the American League, but did not participate in the game due to an infection in his finger. Making the All-Star roster by means of player voting, was Carl Crawford, his third selection, and Jason Bartlett, his first selection. As manager of the American League champions in the previous season's World Series, Joe Maddon automatically became a manager of the American League All-Stars. Part of his job as manager was to select players for the team after the fans and players voted. One of Maddon's selections was the Rays' own Ben Zobrist, which was his first selection to the midsummer classic.

The Rays would send a fifth player, making it the most they had ever sent to one All-Star Game, which was a record that had been set the previous season. Carlos Peña, who had never been to the All-Star Game, was a nominee for the All-Star Final Vote, a process in which fans choose one of five players in each league to take the final roster spots on the All-Star squads. Voting began after the initial All-Star rosters were announced. To help garner votes for Peña, the Rays started the "Vote for 'Los" campaign, having T-shirts made with Peña's face on them which players wore during batting practice. The Rays asked fans to bring their laptop computers to Tropicana Field and vote online during the game, as well as using advertisements, online commercials, fliers, merchandise, and even a video message from comedian Rob Schneider. Despite all efforts, Peña would ultimately finish fourth in the voting. Brandon Inge of the Detroit Tigers received the most votes to get the last remaining spot. Even though he didn't win, Peña said he was flattered and humbled to see how many were in support of him to make the All-Star Game. Peña would eventually make the team anyway as a replacement to Dustin Pedroia, who would have been the starting 2nd baseman, as he pulled out due to a "serious family health matter" involving his wife.

Peña would also take part in the Home Run Derby. In the first round, he hit 5 home runs, good enough for fourth place. Two other participants would do the same, and so a "swing-off" was needed to determine who would advance to the next round. In the tiebreaker, Peña would only hit one home run, and was eliminated after Albert Pujols hit two.

Crawford was named MVP of the All-Star Game, for taking a home run away from Brad Hawpe in the bottom of the 7th inning. Had Crawford not made the catch, Hawpe would have broken a 3–3 tie in favor of the National League. Crawford's grab turned out to be a major factor in the game, as the American League would go on to win 4–3.

On July 23, Mark Buehrle of the Chicago White Sox threw a perfect game against the Rays. It was only the eighteenth perfect game in Major League Baseball history.

On the road against the Toronto Blue Jays on July 25, the Rays were down 8–0 after four innings, and losing 9–1 entering the 7th inning. However the Rays would score eight runs over the next 3 innings to tie the game, including two solo home runs in the 9th inning. The game would enter extra innings, where the Rays would take a one-run lead into the bottom of the 12th inning. Joe Nelson would come in to pitch as the Rays' last remaining relief pitcher available. The Blue Jays would load the bases with one out, but could not capitalize. This became the largest come from behind win in franchise history for the Rays, a record previously set earlier in the season.

Finishing the month with an even 12–12 record, the Rays had an overall record of 56–47. Even with the fifth-most wins in the American League, they were 6 games behind for the lead in the division, and 4 1/2 games behind for the wild card. They made no big moves on the July 31 trade deadline, though they were rumored to be interested in several players, including Victor Martinez and Cliff Lee of the Indians. Ultimately, Martinez would be traded to Boston, while Lee was sent to Philadelphia.

=== August ===
On August 7, the Rays acquired catcher Gregg Zaun from the Baltimore Orioles for a player to be named later. To make room for Zaun, the Rays designated another catcher, Michel Hernández.

On August 29, the Rays sent starting pitcher Scott Kazmir to the Los Angeles Angels of Anaheim in exchange for two minor league prospects and a player to be named later. Initially, there was confusion about whether or not a deal had been made, or if it had been in the works before falling through. Kazmir himself said he knew nothing about a trade, asking reporters who were questioning him if they were joking. The Rays would not confirm that a trade was being made, but a leak to the news by the Angels reportedly almost led the Rays to call it off because of their policy to notify the player first. The websites for ESPN and MLB reported in the afternoon that the trade had been completed, however MLB took down their report and replaced it with a story stating that the trade would not occur. Kazmir was in uniform for the Rays that night as they played the Detroit Tigers, but was not the starting pitcher in the game. After the conclusion of the game, it was confirmed by the Rays that Kazmir had been dealt. Drafted by the New York Mets, the Rays acquired Kazmir in a trade considered to be one of the best in franchise history. In his six seasons with the Rays, Kazmir became the club's all-time leader in wins, strikeouts, and games started. He was also the team's record holder for ERA and strikeouts in a single season. In 2007, Kazmir led the majors in strikeouts with 239. He was also a two-time all-star, and the winning pitcher in the 2008 All-Star Game. Andrew Friedman, the Rays' Executive Vice President of Baseball Operations, said that Kazmir's contract was not the primary reason that he was traded, but was an element in the decision.

A day after the Kazmir trade, the Rays activated Akinori Iwamura from the disabled list.

Going 15–12 for the month, the Rays had a 71–59 record overall, assuring themselves of having at least the second best season in franchise history. The Rays had fallen behind the New York Yankees for the division lead by 11 1/2 games, but were still within reach of the wild card, trailing the Boston Red Sox by only 5 games.

=== September/October ===
When rosters expanded on the first day of September, the Rays called up four players. Relief pitcher Jeff Bennett, outfielder Fernando Perez, catcher Shawn Riggans, and starting pitcher Andy Sonnanstine, with Sonnanstine scheduled to start for the Rays that night.

The Rays were struggling to keep up in the wild card race, but took a blow to their lineup on September 7 when Carlos Peña, who was leading the American League in home runs, was hit on his fingers by a pitch during the first game of a doubleheader. It wasn't until after that first game that the Rays announced Peña had two fractured fingers and would be out for the remainder of the season. Peña said that it was a wonder that he didn't pass out from the pain of taking a fastball to the fingers, and that the X-ray of his middle finger looked like "a pencil snapped in half", but upon the realization of having to miss the rest of the year, "hurt more than the hit by pitch itself."

If losing Peña wasn't bad enough for the Rays, their losing streak at the time reached 11 games before it was snapped, although they never fell below a .500 record. On September 22, the Rays were officially eliminated from postseason contention, but would still finish with the second winning season in team history, winning their 82nd game of the season on September 30. They went 11–17 in the month of September.

B. J. Upton became the first player in franchise history to hit for the cycle, doing so on October 2, against the New York Yankees. Upton hit a triple, a double, a home run, and a single, in that order, all before five innings were completed. He would later add another single to finish the night 5 for 5 with a career-high 6 RBIs.

Though they were not successful in defending the division and league championships won in 2008, the Rays did finish the season 3rd place in the AL East with an 84–78 record. Average attendance, as well as overall attendance at Tropicana Field increased again to become the highest since their inaugural season in 1998.

Evan Longoria was given a Gold Glove award for third base in the American League on November 10. Longoria, who was the AL's 2008 Rookie of the Year, became the second player in Rays history to win a gold glove after first baseman Carlos Peña, who won in 2008.

=== Season standings ===
AL East
Team	W	L	Pct.	GB	Home	Road
New York Yankees	103	59	.636	—	57‍–‍24	46‍–‍35
Boston Red Sox	95	67	.586	8	56‍–‍25	39‍–‍42
Tampa Bay Rays	84	78	.519	19	52‍–‍29	32‍–‍49
Toronto Blue Jays	75	87	.463	28	44‍–‍37	31‍–‍50
Baltimore Orioles	64	98	.395	39	39‍–‍42	25‍–‍56

=== Record vs. opponents ===
2009 American League record Source: MLB Standings Grid – 2009
Team	BAL	BOS	CWS	CLE	DET	KC	LAA	MIN	NYY	OAK	SEA	TB	TEX	TOR	NL
Baltimore	–	2–16	5–4	2–5	3–5	4–4	2–8	3–2	5–13	1–5	4–5	8–10	5–5	9–9	11–7
Boston	16–2	–	4–4	7–2	6–1	5–3	4–5	4–2	9–9	5–5	2–4	9–9	2–7	11–7	11–7
Chicago	4–5	4−4	–	10–8	9–9	9–9	5–4	6−12	3–4	4–5	4–5	6–2	2–4	1–6	12–6
Cleveland	5–2	2–7	8–10	–	4–14	10–8	2–4	8–10	3–5	2–5	6–4	5–3	1–8	4–4	5–13
Detroit	5–3	1–6	9–9	14–4	–	9–9	5–4	7–12	1–5	5–4	5–4	5–2	7–2	3–5	10–8
Kansas City	4–4	3–5	9–9	8–10	9–9	–	1–9	6–12	2–4	2–6	5–4	1–9	3–3	4–3	8–10
Los Angeles	8–2	5–4	4–5	4–2	4–5	9–1	–	6–4	5–5	12–7	10–9	4–2	8–11	4–4	14–4
Minnesota	2–3	2–4	12–6	10–8	12–7	12–6	4–6	–	0–7	4–6	5–5	3–3	6–4	3–5	12–6
New York	13–5	9–9	4–3	5–3	5–1	4–2	5–5	7–0	–	7–2	6–4	11–7	5–4	12–6	10–8
Oakland	5–1	5–5	5–4	5–2	4–5	6–2	7–12	6–4	2–7	–	5–14	6–4	11–8	3–6	5–13
Seattle	5–4	4–2	5–4	4–6	4–5	4–5	9–10	5–5	4–6	14–5	–	5–3	8–11	3–4	11–7
Tampa Bay	10–8	9–9	2–6	3–5	2–5	9–1	2–4	3–3	7–11	4–6	3–5	–	3–6	14–4	13–5
Texas	5–5	7–2	4–2	8–1	2–7	3–3	11–8	4–6	4–5	8–11	11–8	6–3	–	5–5	9–9
Toronto	9–9	7–11	6–1	4–4	5–3	3–4	4–4	5–3	6–12	6–3	4–3	4–14	5–5	–	7–11

- Source: MLB Standings Grid – 2009

== Game log ==
2009 game log
April (9–14)

#	Date	Opponent	Score	Win	Loss	Save	Attendance	Record
	April 6	@ Red Sox	Postponed					
1	April 7	@ Red Sox	5–3	Beckett (1–0)	Shields (0–1)	Papelbon (1)	37,057	0–1
2	April 8	@ Red Sox	7–2	Kazmir (1–0)	Lester (0–1)	Balfour (1)	37,552	1–1
3	April 9	@ Red Sox	4–3	Garza (1–0)	Matsuzaka (0–1)	Percival (1)	37,784	2–1
4	April 10	@ Orioles	5–4	Hendrickson (1–0)	Sonnanstine (0–1)	Sherrill (2)	22,866	2–2
5	April 11	@ Orioles	6–0	Guthrie (2–0)	Niemann (0–1)		15,108	2–3
6	April 12	@ Orioles	11–3	Shields (1–1)	Eaton (0–1)		15,531	3–3
7	April 13	Yankees	15–5	Kazmir (2–0)	Wang (0–2)		36,973	4–3
8	April 14	Yankees	7–2	Burnett (2–0)	Howell (0–1)		36,973	4–4
9	April 15	Yankees	4–3	Bruney (1–0)	Percival (0–1)	Rivera (2)	25,171	4–5
10	April 16	White Sox	3–2	Danks (1–0)	Niemann (0–2)	Jenks (3)	13,803	4–6
11	April 17	White Sox	6–5	Shields (2–1)	Thornton (0–1)	Percival (2)	28,927	5–6
12	April 18	White Sox	8–3	Buehrle (2–0)	Kazmir (2–1)		31,916	5–7
13	April 19	White Sox	12–2	Floyd (2–1)	Garza (1–1)		29,142	5–8
14	April 21	@ Mariners	4–2	Washburn (3–0)	Sonnanstine (0–2)	Morrow (4)	19,582	5–9
15	April 22	@ Mariners	9–3	Niemann (1–2)	Jakubauskas (1–2)		16,476	6–9
16	April 23	@ Mariners	1–0	Hernández (3–0)	Shields (2–2)	Morrow (5)	17,639	6–10
17	April 24	@ Athletics	8–2	Kazmir (3–1)	Cahill (0–2)		20,140	7–10
18	April 25	@ Athletics	5–2	Braden (2–2)	Garza (1–2)	Ziegler (4)	15,432	7–11
19	April 26	@ Athletics	7–1	Eveland (1–1)	Sonnanstine (0–3)		18,689	7–12
20	April 27	@ Twins	7–1	Niemann (2–2)	Baker (0–3)		17,988	8–12
21	April 28	@ Twins	4–3	Nathan (1–0)	Howell (0–2)		18,974	8–13
22	April 29	@ Twins	8–3	Blackburn (2–1)	Kazmir (3–2)		21,715	8–14
23	April 30	Red Sox	13–0	Garza (2–2)	Beckett (2–2)		20,341	9–14

May (16–14)

#	Date	Opponent	Score	Win	Loss	Save	Attendance	Record
24	May 1	Red Sox	6–2	Sonnanstine (1–3)	Masterson (2–1)		27,045	10–14
25	May 2	Red Sox	10–6	Wakefield (3–1)	Niemann (2–3)		34,910	10–15
26	May 3	Red Sox	5–3	Shields (3–2)	Penny (2–1)	Percival (3)	32,332	11–15
27	May 4	Orioles	8–4	Báez (2–1)	Kazmir (3–3)		12,658	11–16
28	May 5	Orioles	6–3	Garza (3–2)	Uehara (2–3)	Percival (4)	13,174	12–16
29	May 6	@ Yankees	4–3 (10)	Balfour (1–0)	Coke (1–2)	Percival (5)	42,585	13–16
30	May 7	@ Yankees	8–6	Shouse (1–0)	Rivera (0–1)	Nelson (1)	43,769	14–16
31	May 8	@ Red Sox	7–3	Penny (3–1)	Shields (3–3)		37,745	14–17
32	May 9	@ Red Sox	14–5	Kazmir (4–3)	Lester (2–3)	Cormier (1)	37,773	15–17
33	May 10	@ Red Sox	4–3	Ramírez (3–0)	Shouse (1–1)	Papelbon (8)	37,759	15–18
34	May 12	@ Orioles	7–5	Bass (2–1)	Sonnanstine (1–4)	Sherrill (6)	17,122	15–19
35	May 13	@ Orioles	8–6	Niemann (3–3)	Bergesen (1–1)	Howell (1)	13,237	16–19
36	May 14	Indians	11–7	Carmona (2–4)	Shields (3–4)		17,169	16–20
37	May 15	Indians	8–7	Wheeler (1–0)	Vizcaíno (0–1)		25,827	17–20
38	May 16	Indians	4–2	Garza (4–2)	Pavano (3–4)	Nelson (2)	34,235	18–20
39	May 17	Indians	7–5	Sonnanstine (2–4)	Huff (0–1)	Percival (6)	28,841	19–20
40	May 18	Athletics	13–4	Niemann (4–3)	Gallagher (1–2)		11,420	20–20
41	May 19	Athletics	4–1 (11)	Casilla (1–1)	Wheeler (1–1)		12,842	20–21
42	May 20	Athletics	7–6	Anderson (1–4)	Kazmir (4–4)	Ziegler (5)	13,721	20–22
43	May 21	Athletics	6–5	Nelson (1–0)	Ziegler (0–1)		14,374	21–22
44	May 22	@ Marlins	15–2	Sonnanstine (3–4)	Nolasco (2–5)		16,226	22–22
45	May 23	@ Marlins	10–3	Balfour (2–0)	Núñez (2–2)		20,253	23–22
46	May 24	@ Marlins	5–4 (11)	Sanches (1–0)	Cormier (0–1)		12,839	23–23
47	May 25	@ Indians	11–10	Sowers (1–2)	Isringhausen (0–1)		20,929	23–24
48	May 26	@ Indians	5–1	Pavano (5–4)	Garza (4–3)		18,754	23–25
49	May 27	@ Indians	12–7	Aquino (1–0)	Sonnanstine (3–5)	Vizcaíno (1)	19,335	23–26
50	May 28	@ Indians	2–1	Herges (1–0)	Niemann (4–4)	Wood (8)	27,356	23–27
51	May 29	Twins	5–3	Shields (4–4)	Baker (2–6)	Choate (1)	19,358	24–27
52	May 30	Twins	5–2	Price (1–0)	Liriano (2–7)	Choate (2)	36,052	25–27
53	May 31	Twins	3–2	Blackburn (5–2)	Garza (4–4)	Nathan (9)	26,579	25–28

June (19–7)

#	Date	Opponent	Score	Win	Loss	Save	Attendance	Record
54	June 2	Royals	6–2	Sonnanstine (4–5)	Davies (2–5)		13,604	26–28
55	June 3	Royals	9–0	Niemann (5–4)	Bannister (4–3)		15,256	27–28
56	June 4	Royals	3–2	Shields (5–4)	Wright (0–2)	Howell (2)	16,103	28–28
	June 5	@ Yankees	Postponed					
57	June 6	@ Yankees	9–7	Howell (1–2)	Rivera (0–2)	Choate (3)	46,205	29–28
58	June 7	@ Yankees	4–3	Aceves (4–1)	Balfour (2–1)	Rivera (13)	46,465	29–29
59	June 8	@ Yankees	5–3	Pettitte (6–2)	Sonnanstine (4–6)	Rivera (14)	44,706	29–30
60	June 9	Angels	4–3	Weaver (6–2)	Shields (5–5)	Fuentes (16)	16,087	29–31
61	June 10	Angels	9–5	Cormier (1–1)	Lackey (1–2)		15,658	30–31
62	June 11	Angels	11–1	Balfour (3–1)	Santana (1–3)		17,086	31–31
63	June 12	Nationals	4–3	Howell (2–2)	Villone (3–2)		18,273	32–31
64	June 13	Nationals	8–3	Sonnanstine (5–6)	Bergmann (0–1)		30,586	33–31
65	June 14	Nationals	5–4	Wheeler (2–1)	Villone (3–3)	Howell (3)	25,841	34–31
66	June 16	@ Rockies	12–4	Niemann (6–4)	de la Rosa (2–7)		28,582	35–31
67	June 17	@ Rockies	5–3	Cook (6–3)	Price (1–1)	Street (14)	26,460	35–32
68	June 18	@ Rockies	4–3	Jiménez (6–6)	Garza (4–5)	Street (15)	28,639	35–33
69	June 19	@ Mets	5–3	Nieve (2–0)	Sonnanstine (5–7)	Rodríguez	38,493	35–34
70	June 20	@ Mets	3–1	Shields (6–5)	Santana (2–0)	Howell (3)	37,992	36–34
71	June 21	@ Mets	10–6	Nelson (2–0)	Parnell		38,791	37–34
72	June 23	Phillies	10–1	Moyer (5–6)	Price (1–2)		38,971	37–35
73	June 24	Phillies	7–1	Garza (5–5)	Blanton (4–4)		19,608	38–35
74	June 25	Phillies	10–4	Sonnanstine (6–7)	Bastardo (2–3)		20,141	39–35
75	June 26	Marlins	7–3	Howell (3–2)	Pinto (2–1)		20,972	40–35
76	June 27	Marlins	3–2	Howell (4–2)	Badenhop (5–3)		35,790	41–35
77	June 28	Marlins	5–2	Price (2–2)	Miller	Howell (5)	29,459	42–35
78	June 29	@ Blue Jays	4–1	Niemann (7–4)	Halladay (10–2)	Choate (4)	15,665	43–35
79	June 30	@ Blue Jays	4–1	Garza (6–5)	Richmond (6–5)	Howell (6)	15,477	44–35

July (12–12)

#	Date	Opponent	Score	Win	Loss	Save	Attendance	Record
80	July 1	@ Blue Jays	5–0	Romero (7–3)	Shields (6–6)		30,533	44–36
81	July 3	@ Rangers	3–1	Hunter (1–1)	Kazmir (4–5)	Francisco (13)	39,123	44–37
82	July 4	@ Rangers	12–4	Holland (2–5)	Price (2–3)		43,809	44–38
83	July 5	@ Rangers	5–2	Feldman (7–2)	Garza (6–6)	Francisco (14)	22,324	44–39
84	July 7	Blue Jays	3–1 (11)	Wheeler (3–1)	League (1–4)		15,244	45–39
85	July 8	Blue Jays	10–9	Howell (5–2)	Frasor (5–2)		15,252	46–39
86	July 9	Blue Jays	3–1	Price (3–3)	Halladay (10–3)	Wheeler (1)	25,749	47–39
87	July 10	Athletics	6–0	Niemann (8–4)	Mazzaro (2–5)		20,358	48–39
88	July 11	Athletics	7–2	Braden (7–7)	Garza (6–7)		33,273	48–40
89	July 12	Athletics	7–3	Wuertz (5–1)	Wheeler (3–2)	Bailey (10)	29,727	48–41
All-Star Break: AL defeats NL, 4–3
90	July 17	@ Royals	8–7	Nelson (3–0)	Cruz (3–3)	Howell (7)	33,568	49–41
91	July 18	@ Royals	4–2	Bradford (1–0)	Cruz (3–4)	Howell (8)	30,288	50–41
92	July 19	@ Royals	4–3	Balfour (4–1)	Wright (0–3)	Howell (9)	18,934	51–41
93	July 20	@ White Sox	4–3	Floyd (8–6)	Price (3–4)	Jenks (22)	39,024	51–42
94	July 21	@ White Sox	3–2	Niemann (8–4)	Jenks (2–3)	Howell (10)	23,319	52–42
95	July 22	@ White Sox	4–3	Carrasco (3–0)	Wheeler (3–3)	Thornton (1)	26,257	52–43
96	July 23	@ White Sox	5–0	Buehrle (11–3)	Kazmir (4–6)		28,036	52–44
97	July 24	@ Blue Jays	4–2 (10)	Garza (7–7)	Downs (1–2)	Howell (11)	24,161	53–44
98	July 25	@ Blue Jays	10–9 (12)	Howell (6–2)	Camp (0–5)	Nelson (3)	26,527	54–44
99	July 26	@ Blue Jays	5–1	Cecil (4–1)	Niemann (9–5)		30,610	54–45
100	July 27	Yankees	11–4	Burnett (10–4)	Shields (6–7)	Robertson (1)	33,442	54–46
101	July 28	Yankees	6–2	Kazmir (5–6)	Sabathia (10–7)		32,304	55–46
102	July 29	Yankees	6–2	Chamberlin (7–2)	Garza (7–8)		32,398	55–47
103	July 31	Royals	8–2	Price (4–4)	Ponson (1–7)		26,596	56–47

August (15–12)

#	Date	Opponent	Score	Win	Loss	Save	Attendance	Record
104	August 1	Royals	7–1	Niemann (10–5)	Chen (0–6)		36,973	57–47
105	August 2	Royals	4–1	Bannister (7–7)	Shields (6–8)	Soria (18)	27,930	57–48
106	August 3	Royals	10–4	Kazmir (6–6)	Greinke (10–7)		24,219	58–48
107	August 4	Red Sox	4–2 (13)	Cormier (2–1)	Saito (2–3)		29,873	59–48
108	August 5	Red Sox	6–4	Price (5–4)	Penny (7–6)	Howell (12)	31,517	60–48
109	August 7	@ Mariners	7–6 (11)	Kelley (4–1)	Howell (6–3)		44,378	60–49
110	August 8	@ Mariners	10–4	Shields (7–8)	Jakubauskas (5–7)		28,239	61–49
111	August 9	@ Mariners	11–2	Rowland-Smith (2–1)	Kazmir (6–7)		28,490	61–50
112	August 10	@ Angels	8–7	Jepsen (4–3)	Springer (0–2)	Fuentes (16)	37,388	61–51
113	August 11	@ Angels	6–0	Santana (5–6)	Price (5–5)		43,559	61–52
114	August 12	@ Angels	10–5	Bulger (5–1)	Balfour (4–2)		37,589	61–53
115	August 14	Blue Jays	5–2	Halladay (13–5)	Shields (7–9)	Frasor (6)	21,522	61–54
116	August 15	Blue Jays	8–3	Kazmir (7–7)	Tallet (5–7)		29,632	62–54
117	August 16	Blue Jays	5–2	Wheeler (4–3)	League (1–5)		24,625	63–54
118	August 18	Orioles	5–4	Price (6–5)	Berken (2–11)	Howell (13)	16,514	64–54
119	August 19	Orioles	3–1	Niemann (11–5)	Tillman (1–1)	Howell (14)	18,474	65–54
120	August 20	Orioles	8–7	Matusz (2–2)	Shields (7–10)	Johnson (5)	15,870	65–55
121	August 21	Rangers	5–3	Kazmir (8–7)	Nippert (4–2)	Howell (15)	20,639	66–55
122	August 22	Rangers	5–4 (10)	Balfour (5–2)	Grilli (1–3)		34,281	67–55
123	August 23	Rangers	4–0	Feldman (13–4)	Price (6–6)		29,101	67–56
124	August 24	@ Blue Jays	12–7	Niemann (12–5)	Halladay (13–7)		17,184	68–56
125	August 25	@ Blue Jays	7–3	Shields (8–10)	Cecil (5–3)		17,307	69–56
126	August 26	@ Blue Jays	3–2	League (2–5)	Howell (6–4)		15,349	69–57
127	August 28	@ Tigers	6–2	Porcello (11–8)	Garza (7–9)		35,030	69–58
128	August 29	@ Tigers	3–1	Price (7–6)	Robertson (1–1)	Howell (16)	39,296	70–58
129	August 30	@ Tigers	4–3	Verlander (15–7)	Balfour (5–3)	Rodney (29)	36,067	70–59
130	August 31	@ Tigers	11–7	Shields (9–10)	Washburn (9–8)		26,533	71–59

September (11–17)

#	Date	Opponent	Score	Win	Loss	Save	Attendance	Record
131	September 1	Red Sox	8–4	Lester (11–7)	Sonnanstine (6–8)	Papelbon (33)	17,692	71–60
132	September 2	Red Sox	8–5	Howell (7–4)	Ramírez (7–4)	Wheeler (2)	19,148	72–60
133	September 3	Red Sox	6–3	Buchholz (4–3)	Price (7–7)	Papelbon (34)	20,823	72–61
134	September 4	Tigers	4–3	Verlander (16–7)	Howell (7–5)	Rodney (32)	18,596	72–62
135	September 5	Tigers	8–6	Seay (5–2)	Balfour (5–4)	Lyon (2)	36,973	72–63
136	September 6	Tigers	4–3	Jackson (12–6)	Springer (0–3)	Lyon (3)	28,059	72–64
137	September 7	@ Yankees	4–1	Hughes (6–3)	Cormier (2–2)	Rivera (39)	47,436	72–65
138	September 7	@ Yankees	11–1	Burnett (11–8)	Sonnanstine (6–9)		45,953	72–66
139	September 8	@ Yankees	3–2	Rivera (2–2)	Wheeler (4–4)		45,350	72–67
140	September 9	@ Yankees	4–2	Albaladejo (5–1)	Cormier (2–3)		45,848	72–68
	September 11	@ Red Sox	Postponed					
141	September 12	@ Red Sox	9–1 (F/6)	Beckett (15–6)	Davis (0–1)		37,755	72–69
142	September 13	@ Red Sox	3–1	Okajima (6–0)	Garza (7–10)	Papelbon (36)	38,228	72–70
143	September 13	@ Red Sox	4–0	Lester (13–7)	Shields (9–11)		37,271	72–71
144	September 14	@ Orioles	8–4	Price (8–7)	Hernandez (4–8)		10,628	73–71
145	September 15	@ Orioles	10–5	Berken (5–11)	Niemann (12–6)		11,575	73–72
146	September 16	@ Orioles	4–2	Johnson (4–5)	Springer (0–4)		10,548	73–73
147	September 17	@ Orioles	3–0	Davis (1–1)	Hendrickson (5–5)		12,436	74–73
148	September 18	Blue Jays	11–4	Shields (10–11)	Richmond (6–10)		18,426	75–73
149	September 19	Blue Jays	4–1	Garza (8–10)	Romero (12–9)		22,705	76–73
150	September 20	Blue Jays	3–0	Price (9–7)	Halladay (15–10)	Howell (17)	20,937	77–73
151	September 22	Mariners	4–3	Batista (7–4)	Wheeler (4–5)	Lowe (3)	12,514	77–74
152	September 23	Mariners	5–4	Springer (1–4)	Lowe (2–7)	Choate (5)	13,009	78–74
153	September 25	@ Rangers	8–3	Holland (8–12)	Shields (10–12)		29,232	78–75
154	September 26	@ Rangers	15–3	Millwood (12–10)	Garza (8–11)		31,855	78–76
155	September 27	@ Rangers	7–6	Choate (1–0)	Francisco (2–3)	Cormier (2)	37,905	79–76
156	September 28	Orioles	7–6	Cormier (3–3)	Ray (0–4)	Balfour (2)	10,352	80–76
157	September 29	Orioles	3–1	Davis (2–1)	Guthrie (10–17)	Balfour (3)	10,349	81–76
158	September 30	Orioles	5–3	Shields (11–12)	Hernandez (4–10)	Springer (1)	10,554	82–76

October (2–2)

#	Date	Opponent	Score	Win	Loss	Save	Attendance	Record
159	October 1	Orioles	3–2	Waters (1–0)	Garza (8–12)	Johnson (9)	10,716	82–77
160	October 2	Yankees	13–4	Price (10–7)	Sabathia (19–8)		22,704	83–77
161	October 3	Yankees	5–3	Niemann (13–6)	Pettitte (14–8)	Balfour (3)	30,084	84–77
162	October 4	Yankees	10–2	Burnett (13–9)	Davis (2–2)		28,699	84–78

Please do not edit this line: OgreBot End-->

== Player stats ==
Statistics as of October 4, 2009

=== Batting ===
Note: G = Games played; AB = At bats; R = Runs scored; H = Hits; 2B = Doubles; 3B = Triples; HR = Home runs; RBI = Runs batted in; AVG = Batting average; SB = Stolen bases

Player	G	AB	R	H	2B	3B	HR	RBI	AVG	SB
Willy Aybar	105	296	38	75	12	0	12	41	.253	1
Jason Bartlett	137	500	90	160	29	7	14	66	.320	30
Reid Brignac	31	90	10	25	8	2	1	6	.278	2
Pat Burrell	122	412	45	91	16	1	14	64	.221	2
Carl Crawford	156	606	96	185	28	8	15	68	.305	60
Joe Dillon	15	30	4	9	0	0	1	2	.300	0
Gabe Gross	115	282	31	64	16	1	6	36	.227	6
Michel Hernández	35	99	12	24	3	1	1	12	.242	2
Akinori Iwamura	69	231	28	67	16	2	1	22	.290	9
Matt Joyce	11	32	3	6	1	0	3	7	.188	1
Gabe Kapler	99	205	26	49	15	1	8	32	.239	5
Evan Longoria	157	584	100	164	44	0	33	113	.281	9
Dioner Navarro	115	376	38	82	15	0	8	32	.218	5
Carlos Peña	135	471	91	107	25	2	39	100	.227	3
Fernando Perez	18	34	4	7	0	0	0	2	.206	0
Chris Richard	13	19	1	2	0	0	0	0	.105	0
Shawn Riggans	7	14	2	2	0	0	1	1	.143	0
B. J. Upton	144	560	79	135	33	4	11	55	.241	42
Gregg Zaun	34	94	11	27	7	0	4	14	.287	0
Ben Zobrist	152	501	91	149	28	7	27	91	.297	17
Pitcher totals	162	26	3	4	1	0	0	1	.154	0
Team totals	162	5462	803	1434	297	36	199	765	.263	194

=== Pitching ===
Note: W = Wins; L = Losses; ERA = Earned run average; G = Games pitched; GS = Games started; SV = Saves; IP = Innings pitched; H = Hits allowed; R = Runs allowed; ER = Earned runs allowed; BB = Walks allowed; K = Strikeouts

Player	W	L	ERA	G	GS	SV	IP	H	R	ER	BB	K
Winston Abreu	0	0	2.45	2	0	0	3.2	3	1	1	2	3
Grant Balfour	5	4	4.81	73	0	4	67.1	59	36	36	33	69
Jeff Bennett	0	0	9.95	11	0	0	12.2	24	14	14	11	4
Chad Bradford	1	0	4.35	20	0	0	10.1	22	5	5	2	6
Randy Choate	1	0	3.47	61	0	5	36.1	28	14	14	11	28
Lance Cormier	3	3	3.26	53	0	2	77.1	75	28	28	25	36
Wade Davis	2	2	3.72	6	6	0	36.1	33	15	15	13	36
Matt Garza	8	12	3.95	32	32	0	203.0	177	89	89	79	189
J. P. Howell	7	5	2.84	69	0	17	66.2	47	21	21	33	79
Jason Isringhausen	0	1	2.25	9	0	0	8.0	6	2	2	5	6
Scott Kazmir	8	7	5.92	20	20	0	111.0	121	73	73	50	91
Joe Nelson	3	0	4.02	42	0	3	40.1	32	18	18	27	36
Jeff Niemann	13	6	3.94	31	30	0	180.2	185	80	79	59	125
Troy Percival	0	1	6.35	14	0	6	11.1	14	8	8	5	7
David Price	10	7	4.42	23	23	0	128.1	119	63	63	54	102
James Shields	11	12	4.14	33	33	0	219.2	239	101	101	52	167
Brian Shouse	1	1	4.50	45	0	0	28.0	31	14	14	7	17
Andy Sonnanstine	6	9	6.77	22	18	0	99.2	131	76	75	34	60
Russ Springer	1	3	4.11	26	0	1	15.1	16	7	7	3	11
Dale Thayer	0	0	4.61	11	0	1	13.2	18	7	7	1	8
Dan Wheeler	4	5	3.28	69	0	2	57.2	41	21	21	9	45
Team totals	84	78	4.33	162	162	41	1427.1	1421	754	686	515	1125

=== Roster ===
2009 Tampa Bay Rays
Roster
Pitchers: 49 Winston Abreu; 50 Grant Balfour; 47 Jeff Bennett; 53 Chad Bradford; 36 Randy Choate; 31 Lance Cormier; 58 Wade Davis; 22 Matt Garza; 39 J. P. Howell; 44 Jason Isringhausen; 19 Scott Kazmir; 46 Joe Nelson; 34 Jeff Niemann; 40 Troy Percival; 14 David Price; 33 James Shields; 52 Brian Shouse; 21 Andy Sonnanstine; 37 Russ Springer; 59 Dale Thayer; 35 Dan Wheeler	Catchers: 41 Michel Hernández; 30 Dioner Navarro; 11 Shawn Riggans; 9 Gregg Zaun; Infielders: 16 Willy Aybar; 8 Jason Bartlett; 15 Reid Brignac; 11 Joe Dillon; 1 Akinori Iwamura; 3 Evan Longoria; 23 Carlos Peña; 32 Chris Richard; 18 Ben Zobrist	Outfielders: 5 Pat Burrell; 13 Carl Crawford; 26 Gabe Gross; 20 Matthew Joyce; 27 Gabe Kapler; 38 Fernando Perez; 2 B. J. Upton	Manager: 70 Joe Maddon; Coaches: 77 Scott Cursi; 6 Tom Foley (third base); 24 Todd Greene; 55 Steve Henderson (hitting); 25 George Hendrick (first base); 48 Jim Hickey (pitching); 4 Dave Martinez (bench); 7 Bobby Ramos (bullpen); 61 Don Zimmer (senior advisor)

== Farm system ==
Level	Team	League	Manager
AAA	Durham Bulls	International League	Charlie Montoyo
AA	Montgomery Biscuits	Southern League	Billy Gardner Jr.
A	Charlotte Stone Crabs	Florida State League	Jim Morrison
A	Bowling Green Hot Rods	South Atlantic League	Matt Quatraro
A-Short Season	Hudson Valley Renegades	New York–Penn League	Brady Williams
Rookie	Princeton Rays	Appalachian League	Jared Sandberg
Rookie	GCL Rays	Gulf Coast League	Joe Alvarez

LEAGUE CHAMPIONS: Durham
