= 2009 Oakland Athletics season =

2009 Oakland Athletics
- League: American League
- Division: West
- Ballpark: Oakland–Alameda County Coliseum
- City: Oakland, California
- Record: 75–87 (.463)
- Divisional place: 4th
- Owners: Lewis Wolff
- General managers: Billy Beane
- Managers: Bob Geren
- Television: CSN California; Glen Kuiper, Ray Fosse
- Radio: Xtra Sports 860; Ken Korach, Vince Cotroneo, Ray Fosse

The Oakland Athletics' 2009 season was their 41st in Oakland, California. It was also the 109th season in franchise history. The team finished fourth in the American League West with a record of 75–87, and finished last in their division for the first time since 1998.

The Athletics entered the season with a measure of hope. During the 2008–09 offseason, the team added numerous hitters through both trades and free agent signings. The most notable addition was that of outfielder Matt Holliday. Holliday was acquired from the Colorado Rockies in exchange for rookie outfielder Carlos González, starting pitcher Greg Smith, and closer Huston Street. Oakland also added a handful of veterans via free agency; these included Orlando Cabrera, Nomar Garciaparra, and former Athletics superstar Jason Giambi. The signings were meant to improve the team's offense, which was the American League's worst (as measured by number of runs scored) in 2008.

While the Athletics' offense improved considerably in 2009, its gains were largely offset by inconsistent pitching. All told, Oakland would finish the season with a third consecutive losing record.

== Regular season ==
=== Season standings ===
AL West
Team	W	L	Pct.	GB	Home	Road
Los Angeles Angels of Anaheim	97	65	.599	—	49‍–‍32	48‍–‍33
Texas Rangers	87	75	.537	10	48‍–‍33	39‍–‍42
Seattle Mariners	85	77	.525	12	48‍–‍33	37‍–‍44
Oakland Athletics	75	87	.463	22	40‍–‍41	35‍–‍46

=== Record vs. opponents ===
2009 American League record Source: MLB Standings Grid – 2009
Team	BAL	BOS	CWS	CLE	DET	KC	LAA	MIN	NYY	OAK	SEA	TB	TEX	TOR	NL
Baltimore	–	2–16	5–4	2–5	3–5	4–4	2–8	3–2	5–13	1–5	4–5	8–10	5–5	9–9	11–7
Boston	16–2	–	4–4	7–2	6–1	5–3	4–5	4–2	9–9	5–5	2–4	9–9	2–7	11–7	11–7
Chicago	4–5	4−4	–	10–8	9–9	9–9	5–4	6−12	3–4	4–5	4–5	6–2	2–4	1–6	12–6
Cleveland	5–2	2–7	8–10	–	4–14	10–8	2–4	8–10	3–5	2–5	6–4	5–3	1–8	4–4	5–13
Detroit	5–3	1–6	9–9	14–4	–	9–9	5–4	7–12	1–5	5–4	5–4	5–2	7–2	3–5	10–8
Kansas City	4–4	3–5	9–9	8–10	9–9	–	1–9	6–12	2–4	2–6	5–4	1–9	3–3	4–3	8–10
Los Angeles	8–2	5–4	4–5	4–2	4–5	9–1	–	6–4	5–5	12–7	10–9	4–2	8–11	4–4	14–4
Minnesota	2–3	2–4	12–6	10–8	12–7	12–6	4–6	–	0–7	4–6	5–5	3–3	6–4	3–5	12–6
New York	13–5	9–9	4–3	5–3	5–1	4–2	5–5	7–0	–	7–2	6–4	11–7	5–4	12–6	10–8
Oakland	5–1	5–5	5–4	5–2	4–5	6–2	7–12	6–4	2–7	–	5–14	6–4	11–8	3–6	5–13
Seattle	5–4	4–2	5–4	4–6	4–5	4–5	9–10	5–5	4–6	14–5	–	5–3	8–11	3–4	11–7
Tampa Bay	10–8	9–9	2–6	3–5	2–5	9–1	2–4	3–3	7–11	4–6	3–5	–	3–6	14–4	13–5
Texas	5–5	7–2	4–2	8–1	2–7	3–3	11–8	4–6	4–5	8–11	11–8	6–3	–	5–5	9–9
Toronto	9–9	7–11	6–1	4–4	5–3	3–4	4–4	5–3	6–12	6–3	4–3	4–14	5–5	–	7–11

- Source: MLB Standings Grid – 2009

=== Roster ===
2009 Oakland Athletics
Roster
Pitchers: 49 Brett Anderson; 40 Andrew Bailey; 13 Jerry Blevins; 51 Dallas Braden; 56 Craig Breslow; 53 Trevor Cahill; 52 Kevin Cameron; 44 Santiago Casilla; 30 Dana Eveland; 39 Sean Gallagher; 45 Dan Giese; 59 Édgar González; 47 Gio González; 60 Jeff Gray; 39,85 Brad Kilby; 52 Jay Marshall; 54 Vin Mazzaro; 65 Jonathan Meloan; 62 Clay Mortensen; 55 Josh Outman; 61 Chad Reineke; 63 Henry Rodríguez; 36 Russ Springer; 23 Brett Tomko; 48 Michael Wuertz; 31 Brad Ziegler	Catchers: 35 Landon Powell; 8 Kurt Suzuki; Infielders: 10 Daric Barton; 18 Orlando Cabrera; 3 Eric Chavez; 7 Bobby Crosby; 14 Mark Ellis; 21 Tommy Everidge; 1,5 Nomar Garciaparra; 16 Jason Giambi; 22 Jack Hannahan; 29 Adam Kennedy; 26 Cliff Pennington; 2 Gregorio Petit; Outfielders: 6 Travis Buck; 25 Matt Carson; 57 Aaron Cunningham; 32 Jack Cust; 11 Rajai Davis; 19 Chris Denorfia; 12,21 Scott Hairston; 5 Matt Holliday; 4,5,1 Eric Patterson; 15 Ryan Sweeney; Other batters: 28 Eric Munson	Manager: 17 Bob Geren; Coaches: 4,12 Mike Gallego (third base); 37 Ron Romanick (bullpen); 20 Jim Skaalen (hitting); 38 Todd Steverson (first base); 46 Tye Waller (bench); 41 Curt Young (pitching)

=== Game log ===
2009 Game Log
April (8–11)

#	Date	Opponent	Score	Win	Loss	Save	Attendance	Record
1	April 6	@ Angels	3–0	Saunders (1–0)	Braden (0–1)	Fuentes (1)	43,220	0–1
2	April 7	@ Angels	6–4	Wuertz (1–0)	Jepsen (0–1)	Ziegler (1)	43,396	1–1
3	April 8	@ Angels	6–4	Bailey (1–0)	Fuentes (0–1)	Ziegler (2)	43,283	2–1
	April 9	@ Angels	Postponed (death of Angels pitcher Nick Adenhart; rescheduled for August 27)					
4	April 10	Mariners	5–4	Jakubauskas (1–0)	Anderson (0–1)	Aardsma (1)	36,067	2–2
5	April 11	Mariners	8–5	Batista (1–0)	Casilla (0–1)	Morrow (2)	19,560	2–3
6	April 12	Mariners	1–0	Bédard (1–0)	Cahill (0–1)	Aardsma (2)	12,127	2–4
7	April 13	Red Sox	8–2	Braden (1–1)	Lester (0–2)		21,331	3–4
8	April 14	Red Sox	6 – 5 (12)	Gallagher (1–0)	López (0–1)		22,132	4–4
9	April 15	Red Sox	8–2	Wakefield (1–1)	Anderson (0–2)		35,067	4–5
10	April 17	@ Blue Jays	8–5	Bailey (2–0)	League (1–1)	Ziegler (3)	18,272	5–5
11	April 18	@ Blue Jays	4 – 2 (12)	Frasor (2–0)	Giese (0–1)		21,698	5–6
12	April 19	@ Blue Jays	1–0	Romero (2–0)	Braden (1–2)	Ryan (2)	22,164	5–7
	April 20	@ Yankees	Postponed (rain; rescheduled for July 23)					
13	April 21	@ Yankees	5–3	Pettitte (2–0)	Eveland (0–1)	Rivera (4)	42,065	5–8
14	April 22	@ Yankees	9 – 7 (14)	Veras (1–1)	Giese (0–2)		43,342	5–9
15	April 24	Rays	8–2	Kazmir (3–1)	Cahill (0–2)		20,140	5–10
16	April 25	Rays	5–2	Braden (2–2)	Garza (1–2)	Ziegler (4)	15,432	6–10
17	April 26	Rays	7–1	Eveland (1–1)	Sonnanstine (0–3)		18,689	7–10
18	April 28	@ Rangers	5–4	Millwood (2–2)	Wuertz (1–1)	Francisco (6)	12,627	7–11
	April 29	@ Rangers	Postponed (rain; rescheduled for May 29)					
19	April 30	@ Rangers	4–2	Braden (3–2)	Padilla (1–2)	Wuertz (1)	13,802	8–11

May (11–18)

#	Date	Opponent	Score	Win	Loss	Save	Attendance	Record
20	May 1	@ Mariners	8–7	Kelley (1–1)	Springer (0–1)		25,760	8–12
21	May 2	@ Mariners	3–2	Bailey (3–0)	Aardsma (0–1)	Wuertz (2)	29,484	9–12
22	May 3	@ Mariners	8 – 7 (15)	Vargas (1–0)	Eveland (1–2)		29,963	9–13
23	May 4	Angels	5–2	Saunders (4–1)	Anderson (0–3)	Fuentes (6)	10,397	9–14
24	May 5	Angels	5–3	Loux (2–2)	Braden (3–3)	Fuentes (7)	13,298	9–15
25	May 6	Rangers	3–2	Feldman (2–0)	Giese (0–3)	Francisco (9)	15,342	9–16
26	May 7	Rangers	9–4	Cahill (1–2)	McCarthy (3–1)		13,702	10–16
27	May 8	Blue Jays	5–3	Wuertz (2–1)	Richmond (4–1)	Bailey (1)	14,103	11–16
28	May 9	Blue Jays	6–4	Tallet (2–1)	Gallagher (1–1)		15,817	11–17
29	May 10	Blue Jays	5–0	Cecil (1–0)	Braden (3–4)		15,126	11–18
30	May 12	Royals	12–3	Cahill (2–2)	Hochevar (0–1)		10,156	12–18
31	May 13	Royals	7–2	Outman (1–0)	Bannister (3–1)		16,057	13–18
32	May 15	@ Tigers	14–1	Jackson (3–2)	Anderson (0–4)		26,770	13–19
33	May 16	@ Tigers	9–1	Porcello (4–3)	Braden (3–5)		31,554	13–20
34	May 17	@ Tigers	11–7	Miner (3–1)	Cahill (2–3)		27,535	13–21
35	May 18	@ Rays	13–4	Niemann (4–3)	Gallagher (1–2)		11,420	13–22
36	May 19	@ Rays	4 – 1 (11)	Casilla (1–1)	Wheeler (1–1)		12,842	14–22
37	May 20	@ Rays	7–6	Anderson (1–4)	Kazmir (4–4)	Ziegler (5)	13,721	15–22
38	May 21	@ Rays	6–5	Nelson (1–0)	Ziegler (0–1)		14,374	15–23
39	May 22	Diamondbacks	2–1	Buckner (1–0)	Cahill (2–4)	Rauch (2)	13,586	15–24
40	May 23	Diamondbacks	8 – 7 (11)	Peña (4–1)	Breslow (1–3)	Qualls (11)	21,295	15–25
41	May 24	Diamondbacks	6–2	Outman (2–0)	Garland (4–3)		13,792	16–25
42	May 25	Mariners	6–1	Anderson (2–4)	Jakubauskas (3–5)	Cameron (1)	15,280	17–25
43	May 26	Mariners	4–3	Braden (4–5)	Batista (2–1)	Bailey (2)	10,371	18–25
44	May 27	Mariners	6–1	Bédard (3–2)	Cahill (2–5)		30,012	18–26
45	May 29	@ Rangers	6–3	Wilson (3–2)	Casilla (1–2)	Francisco (11)		18–27
46	May 29	@ Rangers	5–2	Feldman (4–0)	É. González (0–1)	Wilson (4)	30,496	18–28
47	May 30	@ Rangers	14–1	McCarthy (5–2)	Anderson (2–5)		45,325	18–29
48	May 31	@ Rangers	5–4	Bailey (4–0)	Francisco (1–1)		22,952	19–29

June (13–15)

#	Date	Opponent	Score	Win	Loss	Save	Attendance	Record
49	June 1	@ White Sox	6–2	Thornton (3–1)	Breslow (1–4)		26,038	19–30
50	June 2	@ White Sox	5–0	Mazzaro (1–0)	Colón (3–5)		20,519	20–30
51	June 3	@ White Sox	5–3	Outman (3–0)	Richard (2–1)	Bailey (3)	23,207	21–30
52	June 4	@ White Sox	7–0	Anderson (3–5)	Buehrle (6–2)		18,219	22–30
53	June 5	Orioles	9–1	Braden (5–5)	Guthrie (4–5)		12,608	23–30
54	June 6	Orioles	9–4	Cahill (3–5)	Berken (1–2)		20,267	24–30
55	June 7	Orioles	3–0	Mazzaro (2–0)	Hill (2–1)	Bailey (4)	17,208	25–30
56	June 8	Twins	4–3	Outman (4–0)	Ayala (1–2)	Bailey (5)	10,181	26–30
57	June 9	Twins	10–5	Baker (4–6)	Anderson (3–6)	Nathan (12)	10,127	26–31
58	June 10	Twins	6–3	Guerrier (3–0)	Bailey (4–1)	Nathan (13)	18,074	26–32
59	June 11	Twins	4–3	Ziegler (1–1)	Henn (0–2)		13,383	27–32
60	June 12	@ Giants	3–0	Lincecum (6–1)	Mazzaro (2–1)		36,035	27–33
61	June 13	@ Giants	5–2	Johnson (6–5)	Outman (4–1)	Wilson (17)	37,874	27–34
62	June 14	@ Giants	7–1	Cain (9–1)	Anderson (3–7)		37,728	27–35
63	June 16	@ Dodgers	5 – 4 (10)	Mota (3–1)	Ziegler (1–2)		41,169	27–36
64	June 17	@ Dodgers	5–4	Cahill (4–5)	Kuroda (1–3)	Bailey (6)	46,274	28–36
65	June 18	@ Dodgers	3–2	Leach (2–0)	Ziegler (1–3)	Troncoso (4)	50,492	28–37
66	June 19	@ Padres	7–5	Wuertz (3–1)	Mujica (2–2)	Bailey (7)	20,019	29–37
67	June 20	@ Padres	6–3	Wuertz (4–1)	Meredith (4–1)	Bailey (8)	28,074	30–37
68	June 21	@ Padres	4–1	Correia (4–5)	Braden (5–6)	Bell (19)	24,249	30–38
69	June 22	Giants	5–1	Cahill (5–5)	Sánchez (2–8)	Ziegler (6)	27,324	31–38
70	June 23	Giants	4–1	Lincecum (7–2)	Mazzaro (2–2)		32,854	31–39
71	June 24	Giants	6–3	Johnson (7–5)	G. Gonzalez (0–1)	Wilson (20)	35,067	31–40
72	June 26	Rockies	4–2	Hammel (5–3)	Braden (5–7)	Street (17)	20,872	31–41
73	June 27	Rockies	11–9	de la Rosa (4–7)	Cahill (5–6)	Street (18)	18,624	31–42
74	June 28	Rockies	3–1	Cook (8–3)	Mazzaro (2–3)	Street (19)	15,701	31–43
75	June 29	Tigers	7–1	Anderson (4–7)	Porcello (8–5)		10,563	32–43
76	June 30	Tigers	5–3	Galarraga (5–7)	G. Gonzalez (0–2)		12,126	32–44

July (12–14)

#	Date	Opponent	Score	Win	Loss	Save	Attendance	Record
77	July 1	Tigers	5–1	Braden (6–7)	Verlander (8–4)		21,238	33–44
78	July 3	@ Indians	15–3	Huff (4–3)	Cahill (5–7)		26,557	33–45
79	July 4	@ Indians	5–2	Pavano (7–7)	Mazzaro (2–4)	Wood (10)	24,501	33–46
80	July 5	@ Indians	5–2	G. Gonzalez (1–2)	Lee (4–7)	Bailey (9)	19,105	34–46
81	July 6	@ Red Sox	6–0	Anderson (5–7)	Smoltz (0–2)		38,294	35–46
82	July 7	@ Red Sox	5–2	Beckett (10–3)	Eveland (1–3)	Papelbon (21)	37,676	35–47
83	July 8	@ Red Sox	5–4	Wakefield (11–3)	Cahill (5–8)	Papelbon (22)	37,981	35–48
84	July 10	@ Rays	6–0	Niemann (8–4)	Mazzaro (2–5)		20,358	35–49
85	July 11	@ Rays	7–2	Braden (7–7)	Garza (6–7)		33,273	36–49
86	July 12	@ Rays	7–3	Wuertz (5–1)	Wheeler (3–2)	Bailey (10)	29,727	37–49
87	July 16	Angels	6–2	Santana (2–3)	Braden (7–8)	Fuentes (27)	11,113	37–50
88	July 17	Angels	7–3	Breslow (2–4)	Saunders (8–6)		17,147	38–50
89	July 18	Angels	11–6	Oliver (4–0)	Mazzaro (2–6)		16,475	38–51
90	July 19	Angels	1 – 0 (10)	Lackey (5–4)	Bailey (4–2)	Fuentes (28)	18,539	38–52
91	July 20	Twins	14–13	Breslow (3–4)	Mijares (0–2)	Wuertz (3)	10,283	39–52
92	July 21	Twins	3 – 2 (10)	Guerrier (5–0)	Bailey (4–3)	Nathan (26)	12,027	39–53
93	July 22	Twins	16–1	Cahill (6–8)	Perkins (5–6)		22,031	40–53
94	July 23	@ Yankees	6–3	Sabathia (10–6)	Mazzaro (2–7)	Hughes (1)	44,206	40–54
95	July 24	@ Yankees	8–3	Chamberlain (6–2)	Anderson (5–8)		46,086	40–55
96	July 25	@ Yankees	6–4	G. Gonzalez (2–2)	Pettitte (8–6)	Bailey (11)	46,412	41–55
97	July 26	@ Yankees	7–5	Coke (2–3)	Braden (7–9)	Rivera (29)	46,163	41–56
98	July 27	@ Red Sox	8–2	Beckett (12–4)	Cahill (6–9)		37,955	41–57
99	July 28	@ Red Sox	9 – 8 (11)	Berslow (4–4)	Delcarmen (2–2)	Bailey (12)	38,084	42–57
100	July 29	@ Red Sox	8–6	Anderson (6–8)	Penny (7–5)	Bailey (13)	38,193	43–57
101	July 30	@ Red Sox	8–5	Delcarmen (3–2)	Breslow (4–5)	Papelbon (26)	37,919	43–58
102	July 31	Blue Jays	8–5	Braden (8–9)	Richmond (6–6)	Bailey (14)	12,151	44–58

August (14–15)

#	Date	Opponent	Score	Win	Loss	Save	Attendance	Record
103	August 1	Blue Jays	6–5	Cecil (5–1)	Cahill (6–10)	Frasor (4)	35,067	44–59
104	August 2	Blue Jays	7–2	Romero (10–4)	Mazzaro (2–8)		13,070	44–60
105	August 3	Rangers	3–2	Wuertz (6–1)	Wilson (4–5)		10,523	45–60
106	August 4	Rangers	6–0	G. Gonzalez (3–2)	Holland (4–7)		10,781	46–60
107	August 5	Rangers	7–5	Breslow (5–5)	Padilla (8–5)	Bailey (15)	20,560	47–60
108	August 6	Rangers	6–4	Hunter (4–2)	Cahill (6–11)	Wilson (13)	17,214	47–61
109	August 7	@ Royals	9–4	Mazzaro (3–8)	Bannister (7–8)		21,918	48–61
110	August 8	@ Royals	12–6	Greinke (11–7)	Mortensen (0–1)		29,818	48–62
111	August 9	@ Royals	6–3	Anderson (7–8)	Hochevar (6–5)	Bailey (16)	19,439	49–62
112	August 10	@ Orioles	9–1	G. Gonzalez (4–2)	Guthrie (7–12)		14,688	50–62
113	August 11	@ Orioles	3–2	Hernandez (4–4)	Cahill (6–12)	Johnson (4)	23,006	50–63
114	August 12	@ Orioles	6–3	Mazzaro (4–8)	Berken (2–10)	Bailey (17)	19,128	51–63
115	August 14	White Sox	8 – 7 (10)	Dotel (2–3)	Breslow (5–6)	Jenks (24)	20,348	51–64
116	August 15	White Sox	8–1	Floyd (10–7)	G. Gonzalez (4–3)		17,742	51–65
117	August 16	White Sox	2–3	Bailey (5–3)	Jenks (2–4)		20,241	52–65
118	August 17	Yankees	3–0	Tomko (2–2)	Burnett (10–6)	Bailey (18)	24,409	53–65
119	August 18	Yankees	7–2	Sabathia (14–7)	Marshall (0–1)		25,383	53–66
120	August 19	Yankees	3–2	Aceves (8–1)	Anderson (7–9)	Rivera (36)	35,067	53–67
121	August 21	Tigers	3–2	Jackson (10–5)	G. Gonzalez (4–4)	Rodney (26)	15,927	53–68
122	August 22	Tigers	3–2	Bailey (6–3)	Miner (5–4)		26,266	54–68
123	August 23	Tigers	9–4	Tomko (3–2)	Porcello (10–8)		17,690	55–68
124	August 24	@ Mariners	3–1	Snell (4–9)	Mazzaro (4–9)	Aardsma (29)	21,056	55–69
125	August 25	@ Mariners	4–2	Lowe (2–6)	Breslow (5–7)		17,661	55–70
126	August 26	@ Mariners	5–3	French (4–3)	G. Gonzalez (4–5)	Aardsma (30)	18,695	55–71
127	August 27	@ Angels	2–0	Cahill (7–12)	Santana (7–7)	Bailey (19)	43,139	56–71
128	August 28	@ Angels	11–7	Arredondo (2–3)	Ziegler (1–4)	Fuentes (37)	41,912	56–72
129	August 29	@ Angels	4–3	Ziegler (2–4)	Rodríguez (0–1)	Bailey (20)	43,011	57–72
130	August 30	@ Angels	9–1	Lackey (9–7)	Anderson (7–10)		38,018	57–73
131	August 31	Royals	8–5	Breslow (6–7)	Hochevar (6–8)	Bailey (21)	10,376	58–73

September (17–10)

#	Date	Opponent	Score	Win	Loss	Save	Attendance	Record
132	September 1	Royals	4–3	Davies (6–9)	Marshall (0–2)	Soria (21)	10,039	58–74
133	September 2	Royals	10–4	Cahill (8–12)	Bannister (7–12)		13,920	59–74
134	September 3	Mariners	7–4	Snell (6–9)	Tomko (3–3)	Aardsma (34)	10,297	59–75
135	September 4	Mariners	6–3	Rowland-Smith (3–2)	Mortensen (0–2)	Lowe (2)	11,738	59–76
136	September 5	Mariners	9–5	Anderson (8–10)	French (4–5)	Bailey (22)	16,495	60–76
137	September 6	Mariners	5–2	G. Gonzalez (5–5)	Kelley (4–2)	Bailey (23)	16,188	61–76
138	September 8	@ White Sox	11–3	Tomko (4–3)	Torres (1–1)		24,317	62–76
139	September 9	@ White Sox	4 – 3 (13)	Dotel (3–3)	É. González (0–2)		23,703	62–77
140	September 11	@ Twins	12–5	Mortensen (1–2)	Blackburn (9–11)		21,084	63–77
141	September 12	@ Twins	4–2	Anderson (9–10)	Manship (0–1)	Bailey (24)	24,283	64–77
142	September 13	@ Twins	8–0	Duensing (3–1)	G. Gonzalez (5–6)		21,850	64–78
143	September 14	@ Rangers	9–0	Tomko (5–3)	Feldman (16–5)		13,669	65–78
144	September 15	@ Rangers	6–1	Breslow (7–7)	McCarthy (7–3)		15,964	66–78
145	September 16	@ Rangers	4–0	Cahill (9–12)	Nippert (5–3)		23,372	67–78
146	September 17	Indians	5–2	Mortensen (2–2)	Masterson (4–8)	Bailey (25)	10,873	68–78
147	September 18	Indians	2–1	Anderson (10–10)	Huff (10–8)	Ziegler (7)	22,893	69–78
148	September 19	Indians	8–4	Kilby (1–0)	Sowers (6–10)	Wuertz (4)	17,209	70–78
149	September 20	Indians	11–4	Eveland (2–3)	Carmona (3–12)		15,430	71–78
150	September 21	Rangers	10–3	Millwood (11–10)	É. González (0–3)		10,581	71–79
151	September 22	Rangers	9–1	Cahill (10–12)	McCarthy (7–4)		10,475	72–79
152	September 23	Rangers	9–8	Hunter (9–4)	Mortensen (2–3)	Francisco (24)	18,311	72–80
153	September 24	Rangers	12–3	Anderson (11–10)	Feldman (17–6)		11,124	73–80
154	September 25	@ Angels	3–0	G. Gonzalez (6–6)	Weaver (15–8)	Bailey (26)	43,242	74–80
155	September 26	@ Angels	15–10	Breslow (8–7)	Jepsen (6–4)		41,014	75–80
156	September 27	@ Angels	7–4	Saunders (15–7)	É. González (0–4)	Fuentes (45)	38,718	75–81
157	September 29	@ Mariners	6–4	Hernández (18–5)	Cahill (10–13)		18,167	75–82
158	September 30	@ Mariners	7–0	Morrow (2–4)	Mortensen (2–4)		16,930	75–83

October (0–4)

#	Date	Opponent	Score	Win	Loss	Save	Attendance	Record
159	October 1	@ Mariners	4–2	Fister (3–4)	Anderson (11–11)	Aardsma (37)	16,607	75–84
160	October 2	Angels	5–2	Weaver (16–8)	G. Gonzalez (6–7)	Fuentes (47)	14,554	75–85
161	October 3	Angels	4–2	Kazmir (10–9)	Eveland (2–4)	Fuentes (48)	16,539	75–86
162	October 4	Angels	5–3	Saunders (16–7)	Gray (0–1)	Jepsen (1)	16,591	75–87

Please do not edit this line: OgreBot End-->

== Player stats ==
=== Batting ===
Note: G = Games played; AB = At bats; R = Runs scored; H = Hits; 2B = Doubles; 3B = Triples; HR = Home runs; RBI = Runs batted in; AVG = Batting average; SB = Stolen bases

Player	G	AB	R	H	2B	3B	HR	RBI	AVG	SB
Ryan Sweeney	134	484	68	142	31	3	6	53	.293	6
Scott Hairston	60	233	24	55	13	1	7	35	.236	3
Orlando Cabrera	101	414	41	116	23	0	4	41	.280	11
Adam Kennedy	129	529	65	153	29	1	11	63	.289	20
Matt Holliday	93	346	52	99	23	1	11	54	.286	12
Kurt Suzuki	147	570	74	156	37	1	15	88	.274	8
Rajai Davis	125	390	65	119	27	5	3	48	.305	41
Cliff Pennington	60	208	27	58	11	3	4	21	.279	7
Jack Cust	149	513	88	123	16	0	25	70	.240	4
Daric Barton	54	160	31	43	12	1	3	24	.269	0
Jason Giambi	83	269	39	52	13	0	11	40	.193	0
Mark Ellis	105	377	52	99	23	0	10	61	.263	10
Bobby Crosby	97	238	35	53	10	2	6	29	.223	2
Travis Buck	36	105	11	23	3	0	3	10	.219	1
Nomar Garciaparra	65	160	17	45	8	0	3	16	.281	2
Landon Powell	46	140	19	32	7	0	7	30	.229	0
Jack Hannahan	52	119	12	23	6	2	1	8	.193	0
Eric Patterson	39	94	15	27	5	1	1	11	.287	6
Tommy Everidge	24	85	13	19	6	0	2	7	.224	0
Aaron Cunningham	23	53	6	8	2	0	1	6	.151	0
Gregorio Petit	11	31	2	7	1	0	0	1	.226	0
Eric Chavez	8	30	0	3	1	0	0	1	.100	0
Matt Carson	10	21	1	6	0	0	1	5	.286	0
Chris Denorfia	4	2	1	0	0	0	0	1	.000	0
Eric Munson	1	1	0	0	0	0	0	0	.000	0
Pitcher totals	162	12	1	3	0	0	0	0	.250	0
Team totals	162	5584	759	1464	307	21	135	723	.262	133

=== Pitching ===
Note: W = Wins; L = Losses; ERA = Earned run average; G = Games pitched; GS = Games started; SV = Saves; IP = Innings pitched; R = Runs allowed; ER = Earned runs allowed; BB = Walks allowed; K = Strikeouts |

Player	W	L	ERA	G	GS	SV	IP	H	R	ER	BB	K
Trevor Cahill	10	13	4.63	32	32	0	178.2	185	99	92	72	90
Brett Anderson	11	11	4.06	30	30	0	175.1	180	94	79	45	150
Dallas Braden	8	9	3.89	22	22	0	136.2	144	61	59	42	81
Brad Kilby	1	0	0.53	11	1	0	17.0	10	1	1	4	20
Santiago Casilla	1	2	5.96	46	0	0	48.1	61	32	32	25	35
Brett Tomko	4	1	2.95	6	6	0	36.2	31	12	12	6	22
Dana Eveland	2	4	7.16	13	9	0	44.0	70	36	35	26	22
Kevin Cameron	0	0	3.44	11	0	1	18.1	15	7	7	6	15
Clayton Mortensen	2	4	7.81	6	6	0	27.2	37	24	24	12	11
Gio Gonzalez	6	7	5.75	20	17	0	98.2	113	63	63	56	109
Andrew Bailey	6	3	1.84	68	0	26	83.1	49	17	17	24	91
Brad Ziegler	2	4	3.07	69	0	7	73.1	82	25	25	28	54
Vin Mazzaro	4	9	5.32	17	17	0	91.1	120	54	54	39	59
Josh Outman	4	1	3.48	14	12	0	67.1	53	28	26	25	53
Édgar González	0	4	5.51	26	6	0	65.1	76	41	40	28	39
Craig Breslow	7	5	2.60	60	0	0	55.1	37	16	16	18	44
Dan Giese	0	3	5.32	7	1	0	22.0	22	13	13	9	11
Michael Wuertz	6	1	2.63	74	0	4	78.2	52	24	23	23	102
Russ Springer	0	1	4.10	48	0	0	41.2	52	20	19	14	47
Jeff Gray	0	1	3.76	24	0	0	26.1	30	12	11	4	19
Jerry Blevins	0	0	4.84	20	0	0	22.1	19	12	12	6	23
Sean Gallagher	1	2	8.16	6	2	0	14.1	21	14	13	7	10
Jon Meloan	0	0	0.00	6	0	0	8.1	3	1	0	2	11
Jay Marshall	0	2	14.73	10	0	0	7.1	13	12	12	0	1
Chad Reineke	0	0	7.20	1	1	0	5.0	7	4	4	0	1
Henry Rodríguez	0	0	2.25	3	0	0	4.0	4	2	1	2	4
Team totals	75	87	4.26	162	162	38	1447.1	1486	761	685	523	1124

== Awards and honors ==
On December 22, 2009, Sports Illustrated named general manager Billy Beane as number 10 on its list of the Top 10 GMs/Executives of the Decade (in all sports). Andrew Bailey won the American League Rookie of the Year honors with a 1.84 era, 83 1/2 innings and 26 saves.

== Farm system ==
Level	Team	League	Manager
AAA	Sacramento River Cats	Pacific Coast League	Tony DeFrancesco
AA	Midland RockHounds	Texas League	Darren Bush
A	Stockton Ports	California League	Aaron Nieckula
A	Kane County Cougars	Midwest League	Steve Scarsone
A-Short Season	Vancouver Canadians	Northwest League	Rick Magnante
Rookie	AZL Athletics	Arizona League	Marcus Jensen

LEAGUE CHAMPIONS: Midland
