= Heather Hennessy =

American writer (born 1982)

Heather Hennessy (born 1982) is an American former Fox Sports broadcaster, author, and media personality. She was an 800-meter national high school champion and aspiring Olympic athlete before a spine injury forced her off the track.

== Athletic career ==
Hennessy was a track athlete at Archbishop Mitty High School in San Jose, and subsequently Los Gatos High School in Los Gatos, California. In 2000, at age 17, she was America's fastest female 800-meter runner, winning the national championship with a record-setting time of 2:08.84. She finished the 800-meter race with a time of 2:07:73, finishing in second place behind Neisha Bernard-Thomas, an exchange student from Grenada. The only girl to win a national championship in Los Gatos track and field history, she was inducted into the Los Gatos Hall of Fame in 2014. She was top-seeded at the Foot Locker Outdoor Championship in North Carolina in 2000.

Hennessy won an athletic scholarship to the University of Southern California. While on the Los Gatos High School cross country team's annual training trip in Lake Tahoe in 2000, Hennessy jumped off a 50-foot cliff into the water as part of the team's traditional celebratory antics. The impact shattered her spine. She was airlifted to a hospital and diagnosed with compression fractures in her neck and back. She spent four months in a body cast. USC honored her scholarship, despite her injury.

In 2014, Hennessy returned to running, completing the Los Angeles Half Marathon to raise awareness of human trafficking. Supporting Run for Hope, she ran for two Southern California shelters.

== Fox Sports broadcasting career ==
Hennessy was a reporter on Fox Sports, including national programs Fox Major League Baseball, College BCS Ratings, and Final Score Extra. Notable interviews included Francisco Rodriguez and Chipper Jones.

== Author ==
In 2011, under her married name, Heather Hennessy-Howell, she wrote The Adventures of Dangles, a children's book with an anti-bullying theme.

== Media personality ==
Hennessy is featured in Tom Cronin and Jacqui Fifer's documentary The Portal, about how meditation can change the world. It showcased at the Dances With Films festival in Los Angeles in June 2019.

== Personal life ==
In 2009, Hennessy married J.P. Howell, an American professional baseball pitcher who played for the Kansas City Royals, Los Angeles Dodgers, Tampa Bay Devil Rays, and Toronto Blue Jays. The two met as freshmen at the University of Southern California. The two trained one off-season with Olympic skater Peggy Fleming, whom Hennessy had met as a teenager in Los Gatos. Together they founded the nonprofit Discover Your Path Foundation to help kids. Hennessy filed for divorce on August 8, 2016, citing irreconcilable differences.

In 2021, Hennessy sued both Archbishop Mitty and Los Gatos High Schools for failing to protect her against a coach who is under investigation for sexually assaulting students.
