= Tommy Everidge =

American baseball player and coach (born 1983)

- First baseman / Coach
- Born: April 20, 1983 (age 42); Santa Rosa, California, U.S.
- Batted: Right Threw: Right

MLB debut
- July 28, 2009, for the Oakland Athletics

Last appearance
- August 26, 2009, for the Oakland Athletics

MLB statistics
- Batting average: .224
- Home runs: 2
- Runs batted in: 7
- Stats at Baseball Reference

Teams
- As player: Oakland Athletics (2009); As coach: Oakland Athletics (2022–2023)

Thomas James Everidge (born April 20, 1983) is an American former baseball first baseman and coach. He played for 24 games for the 2009 Oakland Athletics. He was a hitting coach in Major League Baseball (MLB) for the Oakland Athletics and most recently coached in the Washington Nationals organization.

== Amateur career ==
Everidge attended Sonoma Valley High School in Sonoma, California. He attended Sonoma State University. His freshman year, Everidge batted .340 with 55 hits, seven doubles, two triples, five home runs, and 40 RBIs in 56 games, 47 starts. Everidge batted .353 his sophomore season, with 22 doubles, one triple, eight home runs, and 44 RBIs in 57 games, all starts. His junior and final season, Everidge batted .357 with 14 doubles, three triples, 19 home runs and 69 RBIs in 65 games, 64 starts.

Everidge was selected by the Oakland Athletics in the 10th round (307th overall) of the 2004 Major League Baseball draft. He joined Brandon Burgess, Daniel Barone, and Darren Sack as the other Sonoma State University alumni in the 2004 draft.

== Professional career ==
=== Oakland Athletics ===
==== 2004–2008: draft and minor leagues ====
Everidge began his professional career in 2004 he was assigned to the Short-Season Vancouver Canadians of the Northwest League. He was selected to the Northwest League All-Star Team that seasons as a member of the Western Division team. He hit .275 with 13 doubles, one triple, six home runs and 52 RBIs in 74 games. With the Class-A Kane County Cougars of the Midwest League in 2005 Everidge hit .279 with 26 doubles, three triples, 14 home runs, 66 RBIs and one stolen base in 114 games. At the end of the season he was named the Kane County Cougars Most Valuable Player. In 2006 and 2007, Everidge played for the Class-A Advanced Stockton Ports. Towards the end of 2007, he was promoted to the Double-A Midland RockHounds, but during the Triple-A playoffs, he was called up to play for the Triple-A Sacramento River Cats. In 2008, he was sent back down to Midland but promoted late in the season to play in Sacramento.

==== 2009: one month in MLB ====
Everidge was called up by the Athletics on July 28, 2009. After a hot start by Everidge, the A's manager Bob Geren said that Everidge would be a starting player. Everidge hit his first career home run on August 9, 2009. After his good start, Everidge started to see his stats decline. After first baseman Daric Barton was activated from the disabled list, Everidge lost much of his playing time to Barton. With Double-A Midland in 2009 he hit .306 with 18 doubles, eight home runs and 53 RBIs in 55 games and with Triple-A Sacramento he hit .368 with 15 doubles, one triple, 12 home runs and 41 RBIs in 52 games. With the Major League club he hit .224 with six doubles, two home runs and seven RBIs in 24 games. On January 8, 2010, Everidge was designated for assignment by the Oakland Athletics.

=== Seattle Mariners ===
Everidge was claimed off waivers by the Seattle Mariners on January 15, 2010. On January 29, Everidge was designated for assignment by the Seattle Mariners to make room on the roster for Eric Byrnes. On February 3, Everidge was outrighted to the Triple-A Tacoma Rainiers.

=== Houston Astros ===
On June 22, 2010, Everidge was traded to the Houston Astros for future considerations. He reported to Triple-A Round Rock. He was released on July 29 to make room for Brett Wallace.

=== Oakland Athletics (second stint) ===
On August 31, Everidge signed a minor-league contract with Oakland and was assigned to Triple-A Sacramento. He became a minor league free agent after the season.

=== Lancaster Barnstormers ===
Everidge signed for the 2011 season with the Lancaster Barnstormers of the independent Atlantic League of Professional Baseball.

On October 10, 2011, Everidge was named Atlantic League Player of the Year. He started all 125 games for the Barnstormers and finished the season with league-leading marks of 41 doubles and 28 home runs. He also topped the Atlantic League with 160 hits, 285 total bases and was second in runs scored and RBI, losing out of a share in the latter with Bridgeport getting a play-in game. His .319 average was sixth best in the league. He played for Lancaster again in 2012.

== Coaching career ==
=== Oakland Athletics ===
Everidge retired from playing professional baseball and was named hitting coach of the Vermont Lake Monsters, an Oakland Athletics minor league affiliate organization, in late 2013. In 2018, he was assigned to the Midland RockHounds. He coached the Triple-A Las Vegas Aviators in 2021. On January 14, 2022, Everidge was named Oakland's hitting coach. He held that job for two seasons.

=== Washington Nationals ===
On February 9, 2024, Everidge was announced as the minor league hitting coordinator for the Washington Nationals. His contract was not be renewed after the 2025 season.

In 2025, Everidge was named as an assistant hitting coach for the Nationals' High-A affiliate, the Wilmington Blue Rocks.

=== San Francisco Giants ===
On January 23, 2026, Everidge was announced as the hitting coach for the Richmond Flying Squirrels, the Double-A affiliate of the San Francisco Giants.

== Personal life ==
Everidge and his wife have three children.
