= J. P. Howell =

American baseball player (born 1983)

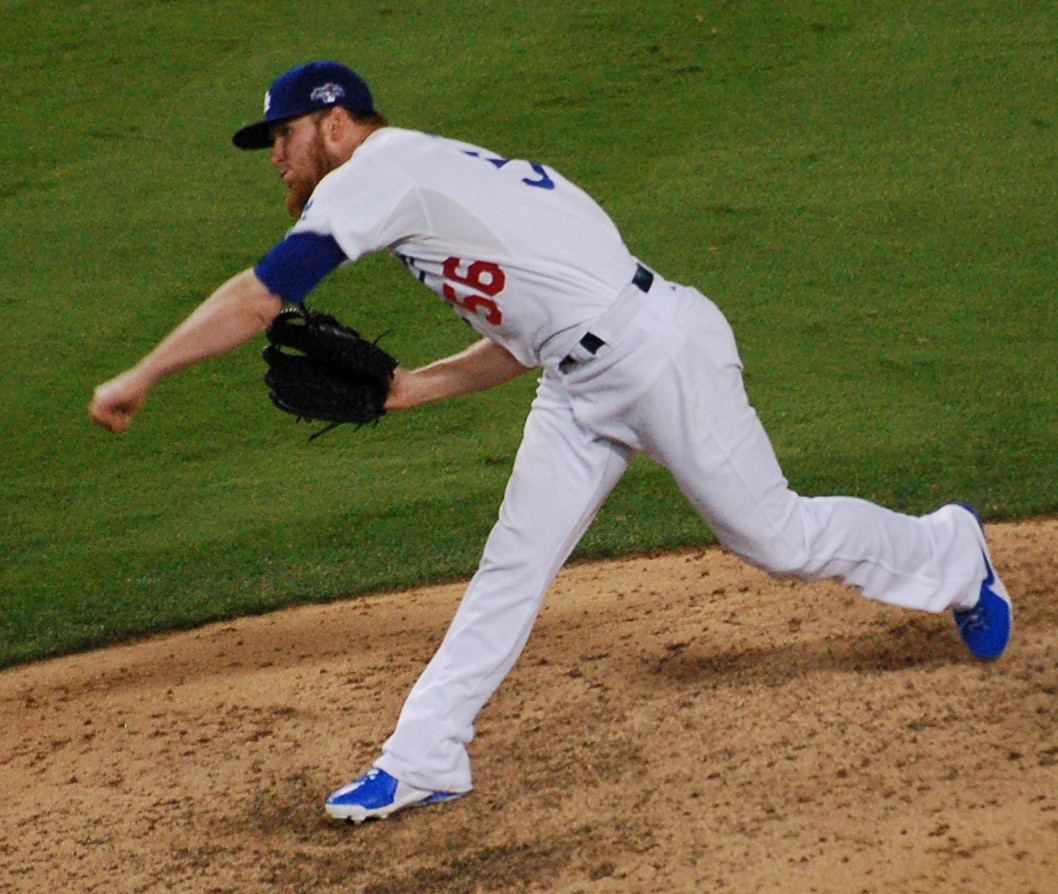
- Howell with the Los Angeles Dodgers in 2013
- Pitcher
- Born: April 25, 1983 (age 42); Modesto, California, U.S.
- Batted: Left Threw: Left

MLB debut
- June 11, 2005, for the Kansas City Royals

Last MLB appearance
- August 13, 2017, for the Toronto Blue Jays

MLB statistics
- Win–loss record: 36–30
- Earned run average: 3.83
- Strikeouts: 566
- Saves: 22
- Stats at Baseball Reference

Teams
- Kansas City Royals (2005); Tampa Bay Devil Rays / Rays (2006–2009, 2011–2012); Los Angeles Dodgers (2013–2016); Toronto Blue Jays (2017)
Medals
Men's baseball
Representing United States
World Junior Baseball Championship
Silver medal – second place	2000 Edmonton	Team

James Phillip Howell (born April 25, 1983) is an American former professional baseball pitcher. He played in Major League Baseball (MLB) for the Kansas City Royals, Tampa Bay Devil Rays/Rays, Los Angeles Dodgers, and Toronto Blue Jays.

== Career ==
=== Amateur career ===
Howell attended Jesuit High School in Sacramento, California where he was a four-year varsity letterwinner. In his senior season, he was 10–0 with a 0.09 ERA and 137 strikeouts, earning California Player of the Year, Sacramento Player of the Year and all-city honors in 2001, as well as being named a first-team All-American by USA Today. He set a sectional playoff record with 47 strikeouts in 22 innings in 2000 as a junior and played in various international tournaments, including winning silver medals at the 2001 Junior Pan American Games, the 2000 International Baseball Association Foundation Games and the 1998 and 1999 AAU National Championships.

Howell was drafted by the Atlanta Braves in the 2nd round of the 2001 MLB draft but chose to accept a scholarship to the University of Southern California, where coach Mike Gillespie said of him, "J.P. is a phenomenal freshman talent." He was 3–4 with a 6.32 ERA as a freshman for the Trojans. He left the program and, after briefly considering transferring to Cal State Fullerton, instead chose to transfer to the University of Texas.

Howell was 10–2 with a 2.52 ERA as a sophomore for the Longhorns and 15–2 with a 2.13 ERA as a junior. In 2002, he played collegiate summer baseball in the Cape Cod Baseball League for the Bourne Braves, and returned to the league in 2003 to play for the Wareham Gatemen. He led the Longhorns to an appearance in the 2004 College World Series championship series. Howell had the lowest ERA in the CWS that year at 0.77. He was selected as 1st team College All-American and Big 12 Conference Pitcher of the Year.

=== Kansas City Royals ===
Howell was drafted in the 1st round of the 2004 MLB draft by the Kansas City Royals. He made his professional debut with the Idaho Falls Chukars of the Pioneer League in 2004, appearing in six games (four as a starter) with a 3–1 record and 2.77 ERA. He began 2005 with the High Desert Mavericks of the California League and after eight starts was promoted to the Wichita Wranglers of the Texas League and then the Omaha Royals of the Pacific Coast League. Between the three levels he made 18 starts and was 8–2 with a 2.83 ERA and 100 strikeouts.

Howell made his Major League Baseball debut with the Royals on June 11, 2005. He started the game against the Arizona Diamondbacks and allowed one run in five innings, with eight strikeouts, to record the win. Diamondbacks outfielder Luis Gonzalez said of Howell, "We didn't have much of anything on him going in. It was like walking down a dark alley." He made a total of 15 starts for the Royals in 2005 and was 3-5 with a 6.19 ERA. He began 2006 back with Omaha, where he was 3–2 with a 4.75 ERA in eight starts, missing the month of May as a result of shoulder stiffness.

=== Tampa Bay Devil Rays/Rays ===
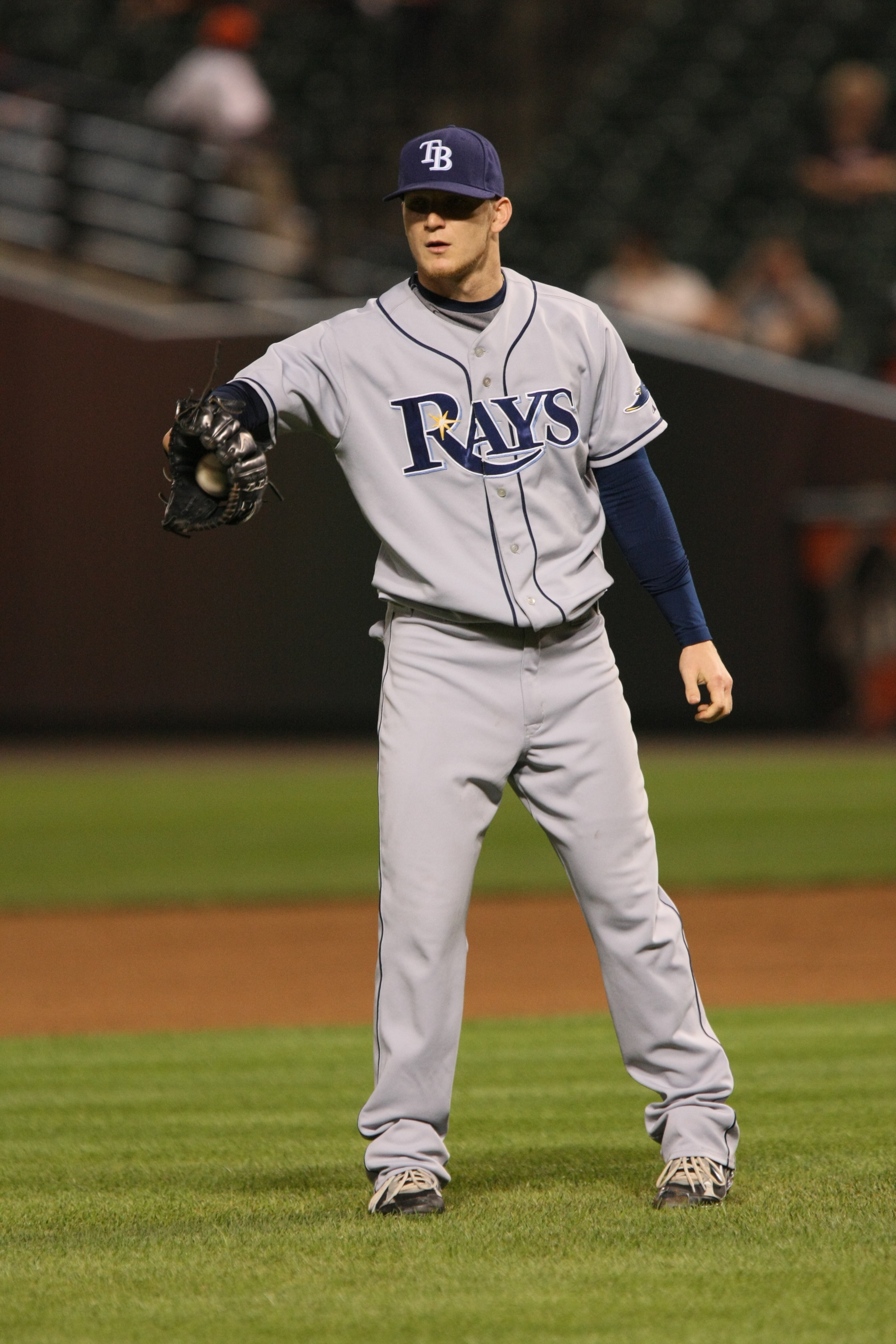
Howell during his tenure with the Tampa Bay Rays in 2008

On June 20, 2006, Howell was traded to the Tampa Bay Devil Rays for infielder Fernando Cortez and outfielder Joey Gathright. It was the first trade by new Royals general manager Dayton Moore who said the deal was made to improve the outfield defense. Devil Rays vice-president Andrew Friedman said that he envisioned Howell pitching in their starting rotation at some point.

Howell was assigned to the Triple-A Durham Bulls, where he made ten starts and was 5–3 with a 2.62 ERA. He made his Devil Rays debut on August 1, 2006, against the Detroit Tigers, allowing six runs in only 3 2/3 innings. He started eight games for the Devil Rays and was 1–3 with a 5.10 ERA. He split the 2007 season between the Devil Rays and the Bulls. In the minors, he was 7–8 with a 3.38 ERA in 21 starts and started game one of the International League championship series. In the majors, he started ten games and was 1–6 with a 7.59 ERA.

In 2008, the Rays decided to move him out of the starting rotation and into the bullpen, a change which led to an increase in velocity on his pitches and a better break on his breaking balls. He went 6-1 with a 2.22 ERA in 64 games, striking out 92 batters while earning three saves. He also pitched in the 2008 World Series, in which he took the loss in the deciding game five against the Philadelphia Phillies. Howell's 89 1/3 innings pitched in the 2008 regular season tied Josh Rupe for the most relief innings pitched that season, with Howell pitching an additional 12 innings in the postseason for 101 1/3 innings total.

Howell became the Rays closer in June 2009 after an injury to Troy Percival. He converted his first ten save opportunities and had a 1.64 ERA in 22 innings but after Ryan Langerhans of the Seattle Mariners hit a two-run homer off him on August 7 he blew three straight save opportunities. "Terrible feeling" he told the press. He rebounded and finished the season with a 7–5 record and a 2.84 ERA in 69 games with 17 saves.

In 2010, Howell suffered from what was reported as "weakness" in his left shoulder during spring training, causing him to begin the season on the disabled list. He threw in a simulated game on May 17, but stopped after only twelve pitches, still experiencing discomfort in his shoulder. A few days later he underwent surgery on the shoulder to repair a torn labrum, causing him to miss the entire 2010 season.

Howell was expected to miss the start of the following season as well and was non-tendered by the Rays on December 10, 2010, to avoid arbitration. He was re-signed on December 13 to a one-year, $1.1 million, deal with the Rays.

Howell rejoined the Rays roster on May 20, 2011, and pitched in 46 games in 2011, with a 6.16 ERA. In 2012, he signed another one-year contract with the Rays, for $1.35 million, and pitched in 55 games with a 3.04 ERA.

=== Los Angeles Dodgers ===
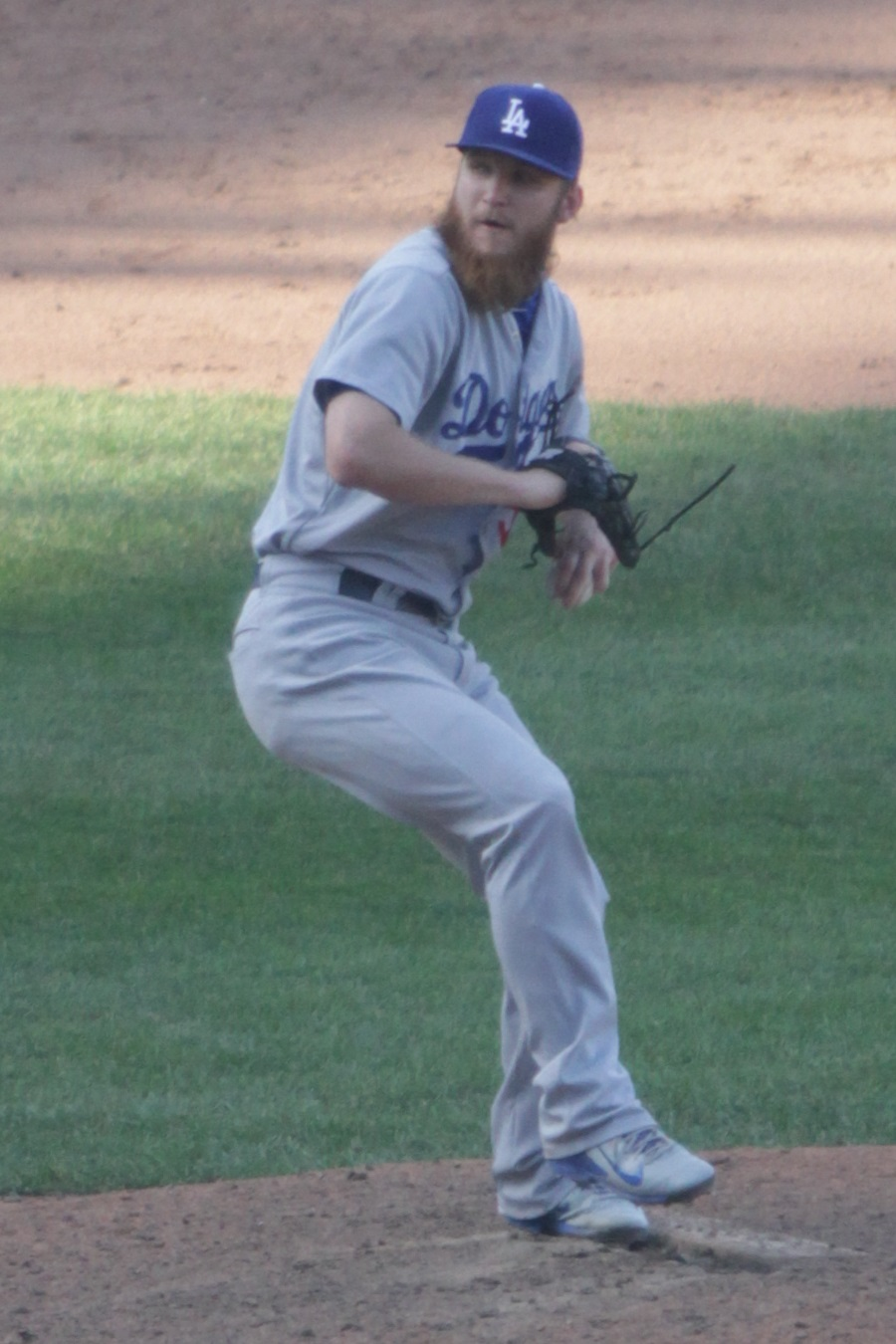
Howell during his tenure with the Dodgers

On January 4, 2013, Howell agreed to a one-year, $2.85 million contract with the Los Angeles Dodgers. He was a key part of the Dodgers bullpen, appearing in 67 games with a 4-1 record and 2.03 ERA. After the season, he re-signed with the Dodgers on a two-year, $11.25 million, contract that contained a third-year option. He had a 2.39 ERA in 68 appearances for the team in 2014. In the 2015 season, he was 6–1 with a 1.43 ERA in 65 appearances. After the season, Howell exercised his $6.25 million player option for 2016. He was not as effective in 2016, as he had a 4.09 ERA in 64 appearances out of the bullpen. He became a free agent following the season.

=== Toronto Blue Jays ===
On February 9, 2017, Howell signed a one-year, $3 million contract with the Toronto Blue Jays. On August 16, Howell was designated for assignment. He was released on August 20.

=== San Rafael Pacifics ===
On May 29, 2018, Howell signed with the San Rafael Pacifics of the Pacific Association. He became a free agent following the season. In 3 starts 10 innings he went 0-1 with a 3.60 ERA and 14 strikeouts.

== Pitching style ==
Howell is a soft tosser. He throws his sinker in the mid 80's, topping out at 90 MPH. He also throws a knuckle-curve that has been described by scouts as "heavy" because of its extremely sharp downward break, and some even classify it as a slider. He throws a change-up that breaks away from right-handed hitters. Howell has solid command of all three pitches.

He was an excellent fielding pitcher in his major league career. In 619.2 innings pitched covering 547 games, Howell committed only one error in 146 total chances for a .993 fielding percentage.

== Personal life ==
In 2009, he married Heather Hennessy, whom he met at USC, a former USC 800 meter runner and Fox Sports reporter who is a member of the Los Gatos High School Athletic Hall of Fame. The couple founded Discover Your Path Foundation to reach out to kids together. In 2011, Heather Hennessy-Howell published a children's book, 'The Adventures of Dangles' with an anti-bullying theme. In August 2016, his wife filed for divorce, citing irreconcilable differences, listing their date of separation as August 8.
