= Brad Kilby =

American baseball player (born 1983)

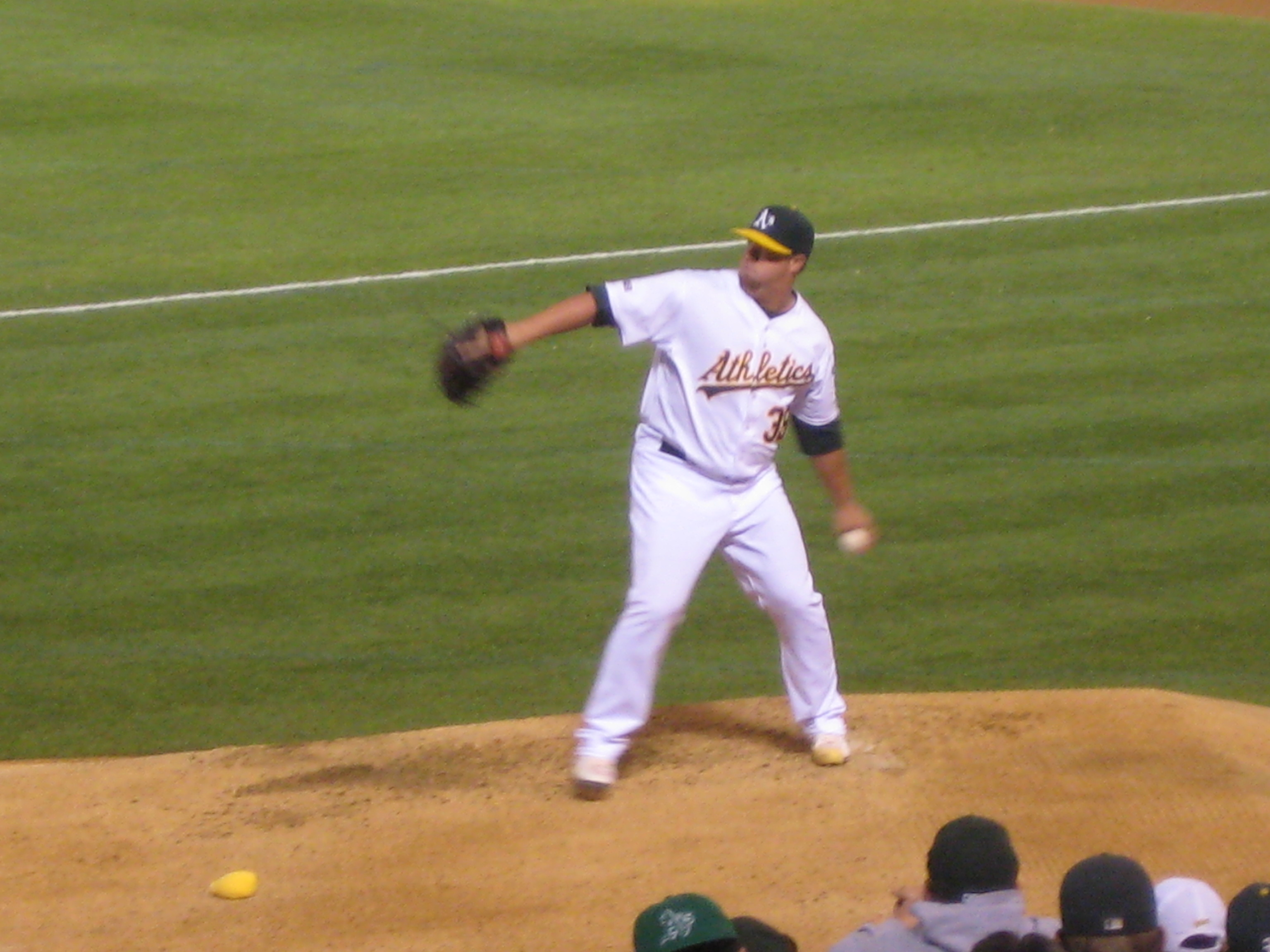
- Kilby with the Oakland Athletics
- Pitcher
- Born: February 19, 1983 (age 43); Modesto, California, U.S.
- Batted: Left Threw: Left

MLB debut
- September 2, 2009, for the Oakland Athletics

Last MLB appearance
- May 2, 2010, for the Oakland Athletics

MLB statistics
- Win–loss record: 1–0
- Earned run average: 1.07
- Strikeouts: 28
- Stats at Baseball Reference

Teams
- Oakland Athletics (2009–2010)

Brad Thomas Kilby (born February 19, 1983) is a left-handed former Major League Baseball pitcher. Kilby was selected by the Athletics in the twenty ninth round of the 2005 Major League Baseball Draft. He is 6'1" and he weighs 235 pounds.

== Minor League career ==
Brad Kilby attended Laguna Creek High School in Elk Grove, California taking the Laguna Creek Cardinals to several high school baseball playoffs. He spent his college baseball career at San Jose State University. Kilby began his minor league career in 2005 with the Vancouver Canadians, pitching 1.95 ERA in 23 games. He spent the next season with the Kane County Cougars, pitching 1.63 ERA in 49 games. In 2007, he played for the Stockton Ports and Midland RockHounds, pitching a combined 2.92 ERA in 54 games.

In 2008, he played for the Sacramento River Cats, pitching 3.47 ERA with seven wins and two losses in 51 games. In 2009, he played for the River Cats, pitching 2.13 ERA in 45 games before was called up by the Oakland A's.

== Major League career ==
Kilby made his major league debut on September 2, 2009, against the Kansas City Royals. In his first game, he pitched two innings, gave up a hit and had two strikeouts.

On October 4, 2009, Brad made his first MLB start, allowing a walk and striking out one, while not allowing a hit over two innings. This proved to be Brad's only MLB start, ending up as the only player in MLB history to not allow a hit in their only career start.

He retired in September 2012 due to injuries to his pitching shoulder. His career ERA of 1.07 is the lowest in major league history, given a minimum of 25 innings.
