= Michael Wuertz =

American baseball player & coach (born 1978)

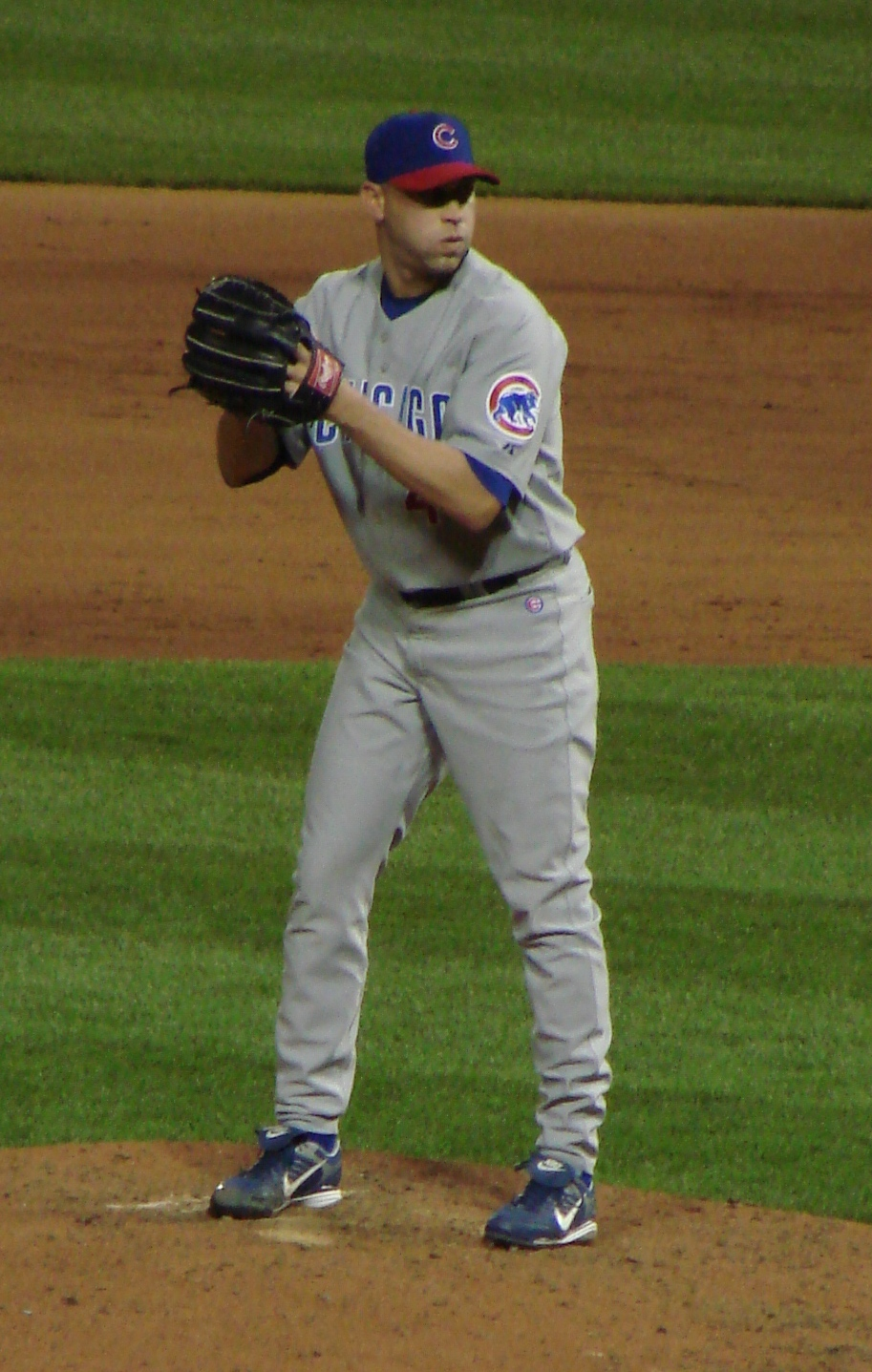
- Wuertz with the Chicago Cubs in 2007

Los Angeles Angels
- Pitcher / Coach
- Born: December 15, 1978 (age 47); Austin, Minnesota, U.S.
- Batted: Right Threw: Right

MLB debut
- April 5, 2004, for the Chicago Cubs

Last MLB appearance
- September 20, 2011, for the Oakland Athletics

MLB statistics
- Win–loss record: 21–11
- Earned run average: 3.71
- Strikeouts: 444
- Stats at Baseball Reference

Teams
- As player: Chicago Cubs (2004–2008); Oakland Athletics (2009–2011); As coach: Los Angeles Angels (2026–present)

Michael James Wuertz (born December 15, 1978) is an American former professional baseball pitcher who currently serves as the interim bullpen coach for the Los Angeles Angels of Major League Baseball (MLB). He played in MLB for the Chicago Cubs and Oakland Athletics from 2004 to 2011. He was known for his slider, which generated the most misses per swing in 2009.

== Playing career ==
=== Chicago Cubs ===
Wuertz was drafted by the Chicago Cubs in the 11th round of the 1997 Major League Baseball draft. He made his major league debut on April 5, 2004, against the Cincinnati Reds, throwing a perfect inning with two strikeouts. He ended the season with a record of 1-0 in 31 appearances. The following season, Wuertz opened the season in the Cubs bullpen and set a Cubs rookie record for games pitched with 75. In 2006, Wuertz spent part of the season on the disabled list, limited to 41 appearances. In 2007, Wuertz went 2-3 with an ERA of 3.48 in 73 appearances. In 2008, his last season with the Cubs, he was limited to 45 games due to injury.

=== Oakland Athletics ===
On February 2, 2009, Wuertz was traded to the Oakland Athletics for minor leaguers Richie Robnett and Justin Sellers. In his first season with Oakland, he had the best season of his career, going 6-1 with 102 strikeouts in 78 2/3 innings. Wuertz also picked up four saves in a team-high 74 appearances. His strikeout total was the sixth highest by a reliever in Oakland history; Rollie Fingers, Dennis Eckersley and Wuertz are the only Oakland relievers with 100-plus strikeout seasons. Opponents hit .188 against him.

=== Cincinnati Reds ===
Wuertz was signed by the Cincinnati Reds to a minor league deal on May 2, 2012. He was released on July 5.

=== Miami Marlins ===
Wuertz was signed by the Miami Marlins to a minor league deal on January 15, 2013. He was released on March 8.

== Coaching career ==
On January 13, 2016, Wuertz was named the pitching coach for the Inland Empire 66ers, the Los Angeles Angels' Single-A affiliate in the California League. On February 2, 2018, he was named the pitching coach for the Orem Owlz, an Angels rookie–level affiliate in the Pioneer League. In 2021, Wuertz was named the pitching coach for the Rocket City Trash Pandas, Los Angeles' Double-A affiliate.

On August 11, 2026, following the firing of Dom Chiti, Wuertz was tabbed as the Angels' interim bullpen coach.
