= Trevor Cahill =

American baseball player (born 1988)

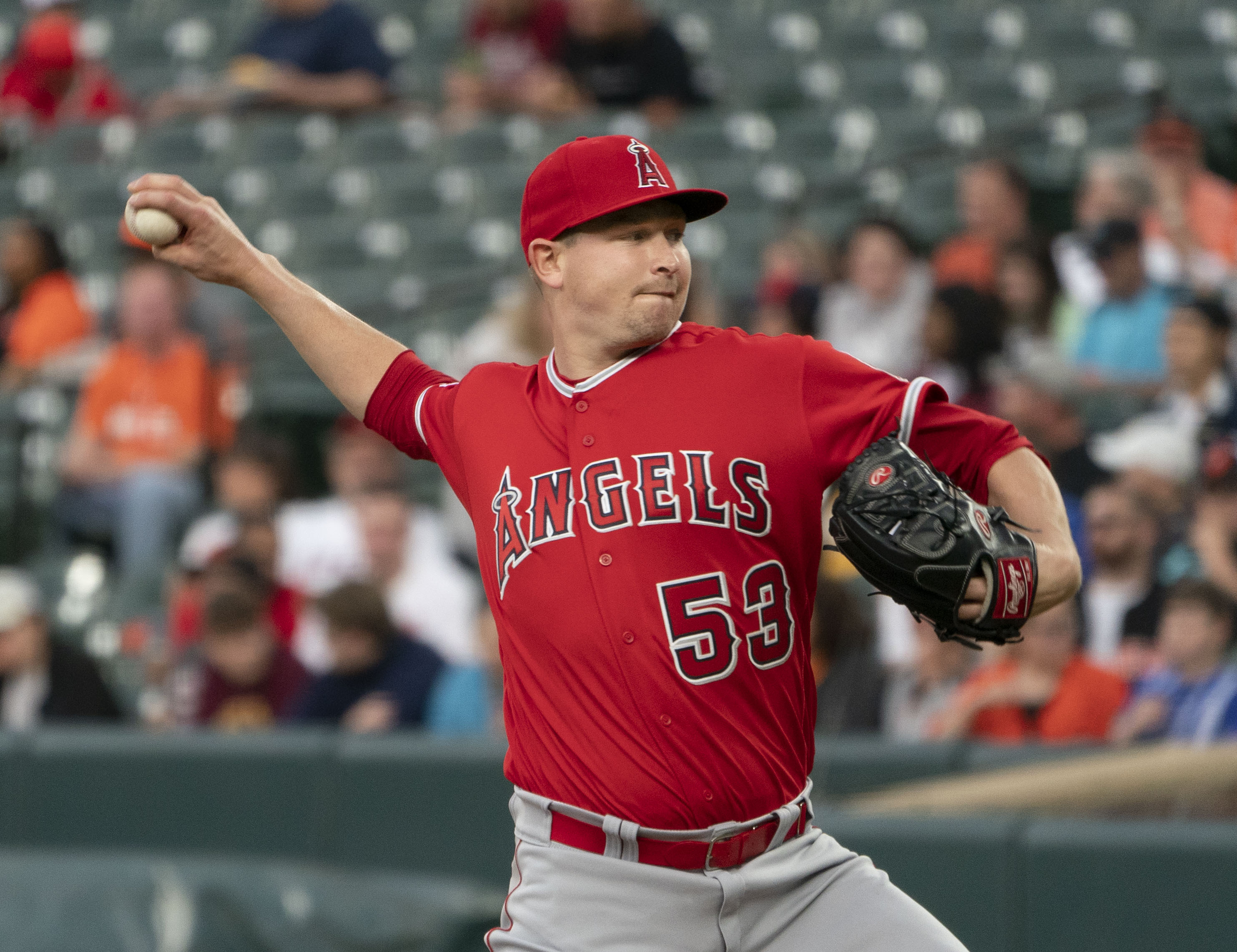
- Cahill pitching for the Los Angeles Angels in 2019
- Pitcher
- Born: March 1, 1988 (age 38); Oceanside, California, U.S.
- Batted: Right Threw: Right

MLB debut
- April 7, 2009, for the Oakland Athletics

Last MLB appearance
- June 11, 2021, for the Pittsburgh Pirates

MLB statistics
- Win–loss record: 86–99
- Earned run average: 4.26
- Strikeouts: 1,151
- Stats at Baseball Reference

Teams
- Oakland Athletics (2009–2011); Arizona Diamondbacks (2012–2014); Atlanta Braves (2015); Chicago Cubs (2015–2016); San Diego Padres (2017); Kansas City Royals (2017); Oakland Athletics (2018); Los Angeles Angels (2019); San Francisco Giants (2020); Pittsburgh Pirates (2021)

Career highlights and awards
- All-Star (2010)
Medals
Men's baseball
Representing United States
Olympic Games
Bronze medal – third place	2008 Beijing	Team

Trevor John Cahill (born March 1, 1988) is an American former professional baseball pitcher. He played in Major League Baseball (MLB) for the Oakland Athletics, Arizona Diamondbacks, Atlanta Braves, Chicago Cubs, San Diego Padres, Kansas City Royals, Los Angeles Angels, San Francisco Giants, and Pittsburgh Pirates. The Athletics drafted Cahill in the second round of the 2006 MLB draft and he made his MLB debut with them in 2009.

Cahill was an All-Star in 2010, finishing 9th in that year's AL Cy Young Award voting, and won a World Series title with the 2016 Cubs as well as a bronze medal at the 2008 Beijing Olympics. He has earned over 48 million dollars in his professional baseball career. Since his rookie year with the Athletics in 2009, his nickname was the Pterodactyl or the Dactyl.

== Baseball career ==
=== Oakland Athletics ===
Cahill attended Vista High School in Vista, California. The Oakland Athletics drafted Cahill in the second round (66th overall) of the 2006 MLB draft. In his first full season in minor league baseball, with the Kane County Cougars, he went 11–4 with a 2.73 earned run average, 117 strikeouts and 105 1/3 innings pitched over 19 starts to earn a Single-A All-Star nod from Baseball America.

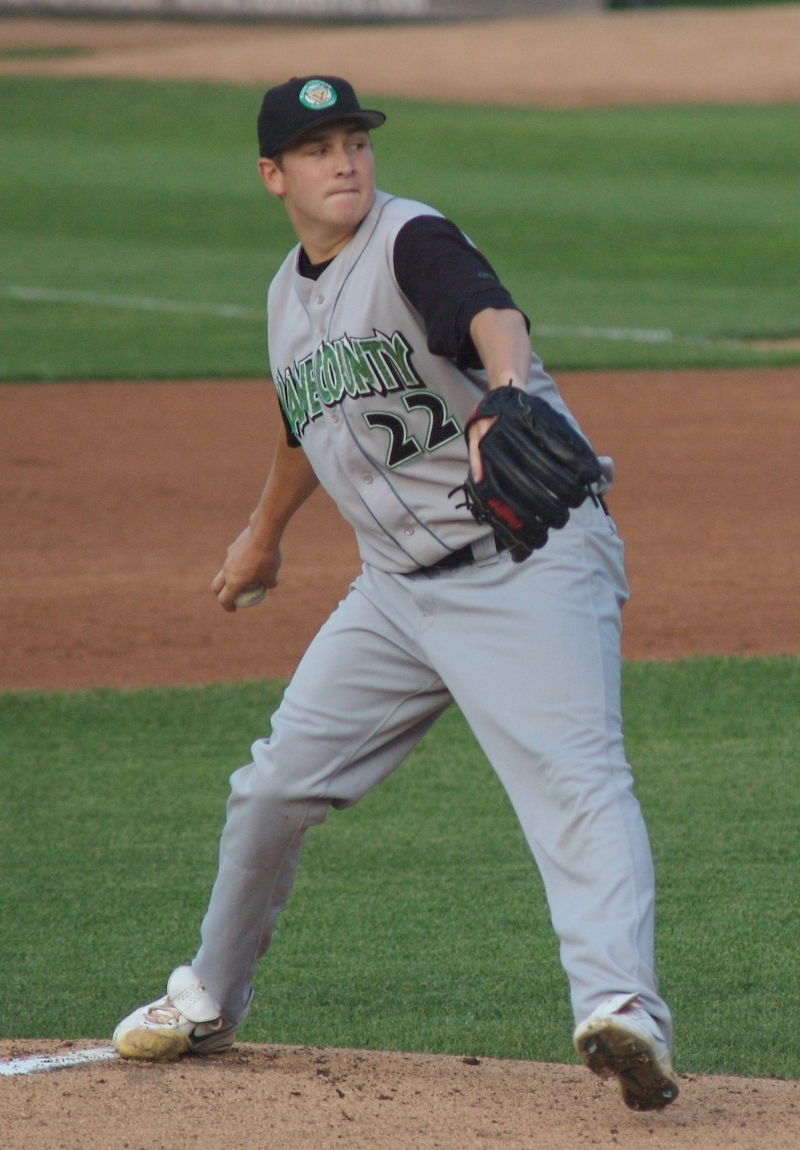
Cahill pitching for the Kane County Cougars in 2007

Cahill began 2008 with the Stockton Ports of the California League. He went 5–4 with a 2.78 ERA and 103 strikeouts to earn a California League All star selection and a promotion to Double-A. Cahill also represented America in Major League Baseball's Futures Game.

With the RockHounds, Cahill was 6–1 with a 2.19 ERA before shutting it down in order to compete with the United States national baseball team at the 2008 Summer Olympics in Beijing.

Entering the 2009 season, Cahill was ranked 11th among Baseball America's Top 100 Prospects, and made the Athletics starting rotation out of Spring training along with his Olympic teammate Brett Anderson. On April 7, 2009, Cahill made his Major League debut against the Los Angeles Angels of Anaheim, going five innings, allowing five hits, two earned runs, striking out one and received a no decision.

Cahill came into the 2010 season as a starter for the A's, quickly becoming one of the breakout pitchers of the year. He put up borderline Cy Young Award-worthy statistics, finishing the season with an 18–8 record and an ERA of 2.97, making it into the Top 5 of lowest ERA in the American League, behind Félix Hernández, Clay Buchholz, and David Price, all three considered among best pitchers in the American League. His WHIP was also in the Top 5, with 1.11 WHIP.

In April 2011, after only two years in the majors, Cahill signed a five-year contract worth $30.5 million. As of 2021, this contract accounted for well over half of his career earnings.

For the 2011 season, high expectations were set for Cahill. Cahill began the season as the A's #1 starter. Cahill did not replicate his 2010 performance, despite logging in 207 innings in 34 starts. Cahill finished 12–14 with a 4.16 ERA for Oakland.

=== Arizona Diamondbacks ===
On December 9, 2011, Cahill and Craig Breslow were traded to the Arizona Diamondbacks for Ryan Cook, Jarrod Parker, and Collin Cowgill. In his first season in Arizona, Cahill bettered his 2011 performance by going 13–12 in 32 starts. He pitched more than 200 innings for the second straight year and struck out a career high 156 batters.

In 2013, through 17 starts, Cahill was 3–10 with a 4.66 ERA. After his 17th start, Cahill was put on the disabled list for the first time in his career. Cahill missed more than a month due to a hip contusion. He came back in mid-August. After his stint on the disabled list, Cahill finished the season on a 5-game winning streak, finishing the 2013 season with an 8–10 record in 25 starts. He led the league in wild pitches with 17.

Cahill struggled mightily at the beginning of the 2014 season. He first began the season 0–4 with a 9.17 ERA; then, he was demoted to the bullpen the following week. Cahill made 15 appearances out of the bullpen, recording his first save of his career and lowering his ERA to 5.17. Despite this, Cahill's control didn't seem to get better; he was designated for assignment on June 9. After going unclaimed, the D'Backs sent him to Single-A to fix his mechanical issues. After a month in the minors, Cahill was recalled on July 14. Cahill was quickly inserted back into the rotation. Cahill finished his rocky 2014 season with a career-worst 3–12 record and a career-high 5.61 ERA in 32 games (17 starts) for the Diamondbacks.

=== Atlanta Braves ===
On April 2, 2015, he was traded to the Braves for minor league player Josh Elander. He made his Braves debut on April 14, yielding four earned runs in 2 1/3 innings. On June 11, 2015, he was designated for assignment. He was released on June 20.

=== Los Angeles Dodgers ===
On July 2, 2015, Cahill signed a minor league contract with the Los Angeles Dodgers. He started seven games in the Dodgers farm system between three levels, going 1–3 with a 5.24 ERA, before exercising his opt out and becoming a free agent on August 14.

=== Chicago Cubs ===
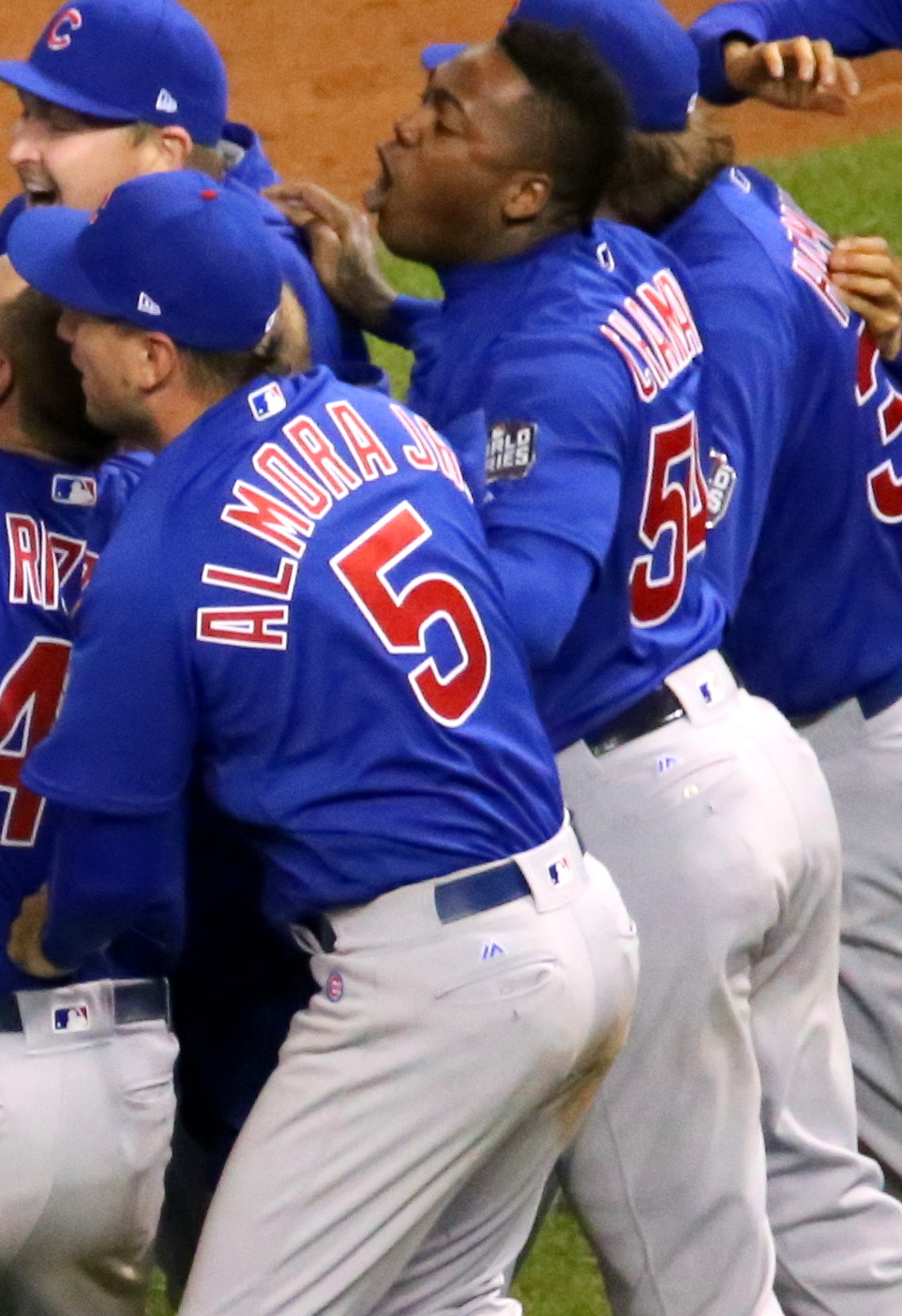
Cahill (top left) with the Chicago Cubs in Game 7 of 2016 World Series

Cahill signed a minor league contract with the Chicago Cubs on August 18, 2015. Cahill pitched in the Games 2, 3, and 4 of the National League Division Series against the St. Louis Cardinals and pitched a scoreless inning of relief in the eighth inning during the Game 2. He blew a save but earned a win in Game 4. He pitched three times in the National League Championship Series, taking the loss in Game 3.

On December 14, 2015, Cahill re-signed with the Cubs on a one-year, $4.25 million contract. Cahill was mostly in the bullpen in 2016, making 50 appearances, finishing the year 4–4 with a 2.74 ERA. The Cubs finished the season with a 103–58 record for an NL Central pennant and would eventually win the 2016 World Series. Cahill did not make any postseason appearances but still won a World Series ring for the first time in his career.

=== San Diego Padres ===
On January 20, 2017, the San Diego Padres announced they signed Cahill to a one-year contract. Cahill signed with the Padres with the assumption he'd compete for a rotation spot. He began the season in the rotation before succumbing to a shoulder injury that sidelined him for over a month. In 11 starts, Cahill sported a career-high 10.6 K/9 while reducing his walk rate. Overall, Cahill recorded 4 wins for the Padres with an ERA of 3.69 in 61 innings.

=== Kansas City Royals ===
On July 24, 2017, Cahill was traded with Brandon Maurer and Ryan Buchter to the Kansas City Royals for Travis Wood, Matt Strahm, and Esteury Ruiz. For the season, between San Diego and Kansas City, Cahill was 4–3 with a 3.93 ERA and led the major leagues in wild pitches, with 16.

=== Oakland Athletics (second stint) ===
On March 19, 2018, Cahill signed a one-year $1.75 million deal with the Oakland Athletics. He began the season in Triple-A until being recalled at the end of April. He was placed on the disabled list on June 14 with an Achilles injury. He finished the season with a record of 7–4 and an ERA of 3.76 in 20 starts. He struck out 100 in 110 innings.

=== Los Angeles Angels ===
On December 20, 2018, Cahill signed a one-year, $9 million contract with the Los Angeles Angels. The deal proved to be disastrous as Cahill pitched to a career-worst 5.98 ERA while being demoted to the bullpen after inconsistency and trouble with the home run ball, as he allowed 25 in just 102 1/3 innings. He was 4–9 with 14 wild pitches, second in the AL. He became a free agent after the 2019 season.

=== San Francisco Giants ===
On February 26, 2020, Cahill signed a major league contract with the San Francisco Giants. Cahill ended the season with a 3.24 ERA in 11 games (6 starts), recording 31 strikeouts in 25 innings.

=== Pittsburgh Pirates ===
On March 11, 2021, Cahill signed a one-year, $1.5 million contract with the Pittsburgh Pirates. In nine appearances (eight starts) for Pittsburgh, he struggled to a 1-5 record and 6.57 ERA with 32 strikeouts over 37 innings of work. On July 2, Cahill was placed on the 60-day injured list with a left calf strain.

=== New York Mets ===
On May 20, 2022, Cahill was signed to a minor league contract by the New York Mets following injuries to Mets starters Max Scherzer and Jacob deGrom In nine appearances split between the rookie-level Florida Complex League Mets and Triple-A Syracuse Mets, he posted a cumulative 0-1 record and 6.53 ERA with 21 strikeouts across 20 2/3 innings pitched. Cahill was released by the Mets organization on August 5.

=== Gastonia Ghost Peppers ===
On June 28, 2025, Cahill signed with the Gastonia Ghost Peppers of the Atlantic League of Professional Baseball. He made two appearances for the Ghost Peppers, recording a 9.00 ERA with one strikeout over two innings of work. Cahill retired from professional baseball on July 5.

== Scouting report ==
Cahill's repertoire included five pitches: he primarily features a sinking fastball with obvious tail, a changeup, and a curveball thrown with a knuckle-curve grip, and mixed in a slider and four-seam fastball as well. Cahill's best pitch was his sinker, which features excellent downward movement and ranges from 88 to 92 mph. His sinker was his most frequent offering and is the main reason why he gets so many ground balls. Cahill's changeup was in the 81–83 mph range, which like his fastball, also had excellent downward movement. He frequently used his changeout against left-handers to get strikeouts.

Starting in the 2010 season, Cahill began featuring a 12–6 curveball as well. His curve, clocked in the 76–80 mph range, became his main strikeout weapon, and he could get hitters to chase it out of the zone as well as freezing hitters with it in the zone. Cahill also occasionally threw a rare mid-80s slider against righties, though it is a below-average pitch. In 2012, Cahill added a cutter to his repertoire. Since 2012, he threw fewer fastballs and gone with more of a sinker/cutter combo.

== Personal life ==
Cahill attended Vista High School and committed to Dartmouth College before signing with the A's. He got a 1950 out of 2400 on the SAT. In the offseason, he lives in Oceanside, California, with his wife, Jessica.
