= Joe Nelson =

American baseball player (born 1974)

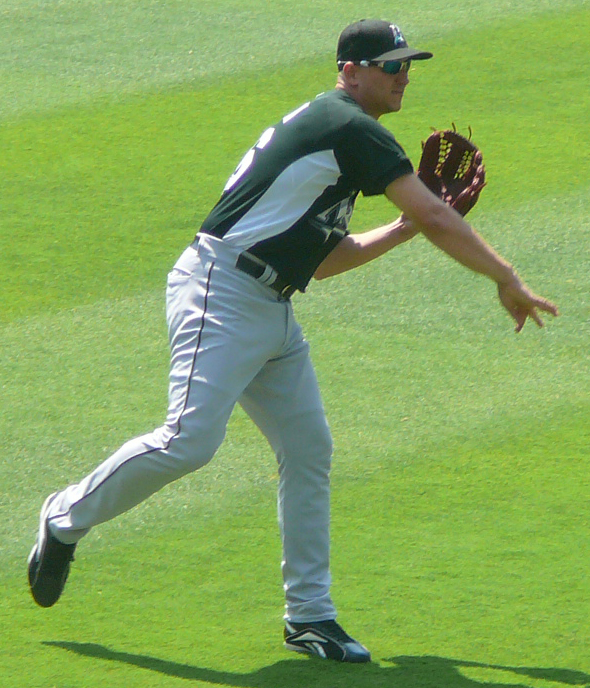
- Nelson with the Florida Marlins in 2008
- Pitcher
- Born: October 25, 1974 (age 51); Alameda, California, U.S.
- Batted: Right Threw: Right

MLB debut
- June 13, 2001, for the Atlanta Braves

Last MLB appearance
- June 9, 2010, for the Boston Red Sox

MLB statistics
- Win–loss record: 7–2
- Earned run average: 4.38
- Strikeouts: 154
- Stats at Baseball Reference

Teams
- Atlanta Braves (2001); Boston Red Sox (2004); Kansas City Royals (2006); Florida Marlins (2008); Tampa Bay Rays (2009); Boston Red Sox (2010)

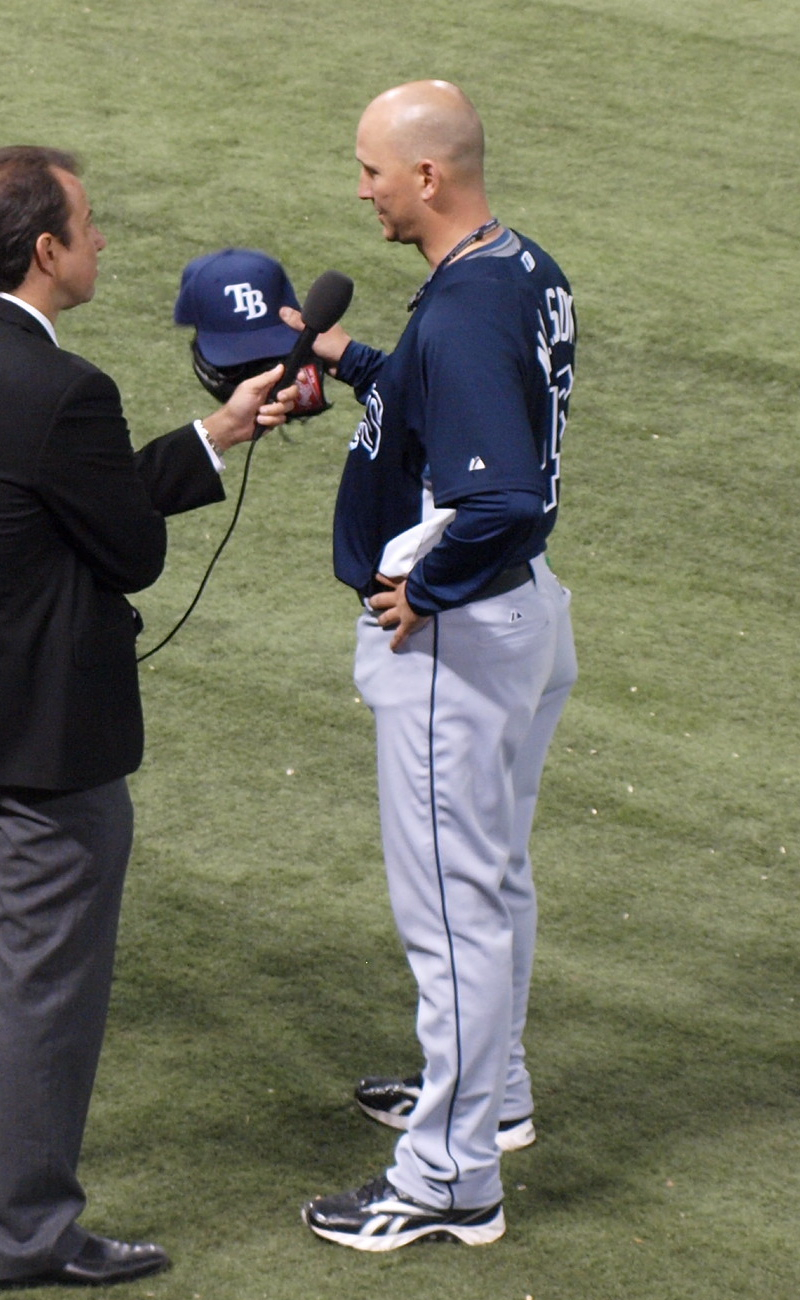
Nelson in 2009, with the Tampa Bay Rays.

Joseph George Nelson (born October 25, 1974) is an American former Major League Baseball relief pitcher.

== High school ==
Nelson attended St. Joseph's High School in Alameda, California. At St. Joseph, Nelson played basketball with NBA star Jason Kidd.

== College ==
After two seasons at Seminole State College from 1994–-1995, he transferred to the University of San Francisco. In a switch to pitching at USF, he went undefeated, recording five saves.

Nelson played collegiate summer baseball for the Kenosha Kroakers of the Northwoods League in 1995.

== Professional career ==
=== Atlanta Braves ===
After being selected twice by the Toronto Blue Jays in the 1993 and 1994 amateur drafts, he was drafted by the Atlanta Braves in the fourth round of the 1996. Nelson made it to the majors in 2001, seeing two stints of an inning apiece in mop-up duty, where his ERA was 36.00.

=== Boston Red Sox ===
Released by the Braves the following summer, he was signed by the Boston Red Sox and quickly released after four appearances for Double-A Trenton. Nelson re-signed with the Red Sox in the spring of 2004, and was promoted to the majors in June as bullpen help. After recording a scoreless inning against Texas, he gave up 5 runs over 1^{2}/_{3} innings in his next two appearances. He was optioned back to Triple-A when Mark Malaska was activated off the disabled list.

=== New York Mets/Tampa Bay Rays/St. Louis Cardinals ===
After spending spring training with the New York Mets in 2005, he signed to play with the Devil Rays' Triple-A team. Despite good peripheral numbers of 61 strikeouts in 46 innings and a .229 opponents' batting average, he went 0–3 with a 4.11 ERA and was released in July. Nelson then had a short 13-inning stint with the Cardinals' Double-A club, allowing just four hits over that span.

=== Kansas City Royals ===
He signed with the Kansas City Royals organization in November. Nelson bounced between Omaha and the major-league club before being called up for good on July 19, 2006. After Royals closer Ambiorix Burgos was demoted on August 14, Nelson threw a perfect ninth inning the following day. Manager Buddy Bell used the 31-year-old journeyman in the closer's role for 2006. In 2007, he was hurt. At the end of the 2007 season, he was designated for assignment to Triple-A Omaha, which he refused and opted out becoming a free agent.

=== Florida Marlins ===
In December 2007, Nelson was signed by the Florida Marlins to a minor league contract. Joe Nelson earned a victory over the Mets in his final appearance with the Marlins on September 28, 2008, becoming the last recorded winning pitcher at Shea Stadium. Nelson was non-tendered by the Marlins following the 2008 season.

=== Second Stint with Rays ===
On December 30, 2008, Nelson signed with the Tampa Bay Rays. In October 2009 Nelson was granted free agency.

=== Second Stint with Red Sox ===
On February 1, 2010, Nelson signed a minor league contract with the Boston Red Sox. When Josh Beckett was placed on the disabled list on May 19, Nelson was called up to take his roster spot. He elected to become a free agent after he was designated for assignment by the Red Sox last week after opening the season with a 9.72 ERA over his first eight appearances.

=== Seattle Mariners ===
On June 24, 2010, Nelson signed a minor league contract with the Seattle Mariners, but was released on July 28, 2010.

=== Post-playing career ===
After his active career, Nelson served as a professional scout for the Red Sox, based in West Palm Beach, Florida. As of 2014, he holds a similar position with the Seattle Mariners. In February 2017, the Chicago Cubs hired him as a scout.
