= 2008 Los Angeles Angels season =

Major League Baseball season

2008 Los Angeles Angels
- American League West champions
- League: American League
- Division: West
- Ballpark: Angel Stadium
- City: Anaheim, California
- Record: 100–62 (.617)
- Divisional place: 1st
- Owner: Arte Moreno
- General manager: Tony Reagins
- Manager: Mike Scioscia
- Television: FSN West; KCOP (My 13)
- Radio: KLAA (AM 830); KWKW (AM 1330—Spanish)
- Stats: ESPN.com; Baseball Reference

The 2008 Los Angeles Angels season was the 48th season for the franchise. The regular season ended with the Angels winning their seventh American League West title and setting a franchise record for single-season wins. In the postseason, they were once again defeated by the Boston Red Sox in the American League Division Series, the same team that defeated them in the 2004 and 2007 ALDS, as well as the 1986 ALCS.

General manager Bill Stoneman retired at the end of the 2007 season and was replaced by relative newcomer Tony Reagins. Reagins quickly made two headline roster moves, trading shortstop Orlando Cabrera to the Chicago White Sox for starting pitcher Jon Garland, and signing free agent outfielder Torii Hunter. Partway through the season the Angels traded first baseman Casey Kotchman to the Atlanta Braves for Mark Teixeira.

On September 10, the Angels clinched the American League West division title, their seventh in franchise history, and became the earliest team to clinch the division in its history. Three days later, closing pitcher Francisco Rodríguez broke the single-season save record with his 58th save.

== Season ==
=== Standings ===
AL West
Team	W	L	Pct.	GB	Home	Road
Los Angeles Angels	100	62	.617	—	50‍–‍31	50‍–‍31
Texas Rangers	79	83	.488	21	40‍–‍41	39‍–‍42
Oakland Athletics	75	86	.466	24½	43‍–‍38	32‍–‍48
Seattle Mariners	61	101	.377	39	35‍–‍46	26‍–‍55

=== Record vs. opponents ===
2008 American League record Source: MLB Standings Grid – 2008
Team	BAL	BOS	CWS	CLE	DET	KC	LAA	MIN	NYY	OAK	SEA	TB	TEX	TOR	NL
Baltimore	–	6–12	4–5	4–4	4–3	5–3	3–6	3–3	7–11	0–5	8–2	3–15	4–5	6–12	11–7
Boston	12–6	–	4–3	5–1	5–2	6–1	1–8	4–3	9–9	6–4	6–3	8–10	9–1	9–9	11–7
Chicago	5–4	3–4	–	11–7	12–6	12–6	5–5	9–10	2–5	5–4	5–1	4–6	3–3	1–7	12–6
Cleveland	4–4	1–5	7–11	–	11–7	10–8	4–5	8–10	4–3	5–4	4–5	5–2	6–4	6–1	6–12
Detroit	3–4	2–5	6–12	7–11	–	7–11	3–6	7–11	4–2	3–6	7–3	3–4	6–3	3–5	13–5
Kansas City	3–5	1–6	6–12	8–10	11–7	–	2–3	6–12	5–5	6–3	7–2	3–5	2–7	2–5	13–5
Los Angeles	6–3	8–1	5–5	5–4	6–3	3–2	–	5–3	7–3	10–9	14–5	3–6	12–7	6–3	10–8
Minnesota	3–3	3–4	10–9	10–8	11–7	12–6	3–5	–	4–6	5–5	5–4	3–3	5–5	0–6	14–4
New York	11–7	9–9	5–2	3–4	2–4	5–5	3–7	6–4	–	5–1	7–2	11–7	3–4	9–9	10–8
Oakland	5–0	4–6	4–5	4–5	6–3	3–6	9–10	5–5	1–5	-	10–9	3–6	7–12	4–6	10–8
Seattle	2–8	3–6	1–5	5–4	3–7	2–7	5–14	4–5	2–7	9–10	–	3–4	8–11	5–4	9–9
Tampa Bay	15–3	10–8	6–4	2–5	4–3	5–3	6–3	3–3	7–11	6–3	4–3	–	6–3	11–7	12–6
Texas	5–4	1–9	3–3	4–6	3–6	7–2	7–12	5–5	4–3	12–7	11–8	3–6	–	4–4	10–8
Toronto	12–6	9–9	7–1	1–6	5–3	5–2	3–6	6–0	9–9	6–4	4–5	7–11	4–4	–	8–10

=== Roster ===
2008 Los Angeles Angels
Roster
Pitchers: 34 Nick Adenhart; 66 José Arredondo; 49 Chris Bootcheck; 52 Jason Bulger; 20 Jon Garland; 65 Kevin Jepsen; 41 John Lackey; 68 Shane Loux; 58 Dustin Moseley; 53 Darren O'Day; 38 Darren Oliver; 57 Francisco Rodríguez; 54 Ervin Santana; 51 Joe Saunders; 68 Alex Serrano; 62 Scot Shields; 33 Justin Speier; 63 Rich Thompson; 36 Jered Weaver	Catchers: 28 Ryan Budde; 5 Jeff Mathis; 44 Mike Napoli; 46 Bobby Wilson; Infielders: 2 Erick Aybar; 43 Matt Brown; 9 Chone Figgins; 6 Maicer Izturis; 47 Howie Kendrick; 35 Casey Kotchman; 39 Robb Quinlan; 18 Sean Rodriguez; 59 Freddy Sandoval; 25 Mark Teixeira; 3 Brandon Wood	Outfielders: 16 Garret Anderson; 27 Vladimir Guerrero; 48 Torii Hunter; 24 Gary Matthews, Jr.; 19 Kendry Morales; 21 Juan Rivera; 77 Reggie Willits	Manager: 14 Mike Scioscia; Coaches: 23 Mike Butcher (pitching); 21 Dino Ebel (third base); 4 Alfredo Griffin (first base); 7 Mickey Hatcher (hitting); 88 Orlando Mercado (bullpen); 10 Ron Roenicke (bench)

=== April ===
- @ Minnesota Twins – LAA won the series 3–1. The Angels won their first series of the season, mainly with excellent pitching. This was despite injuries to starters John Lackey and Kelvim Escobar and relievers Scot Shields and Chris Bootcheck. The series also marked an emotional return to Minnesota for Torii Hunter, who had moved from Minnesota to Anaheim during the off-season. In the first game, Liván Hernández out-pitched Jered Weaver to guide Minnesota to the win. In games 2 and 3, the Anaheim starting pitchers went 8 innings each. Jon Garland gave up only one run in his debut for the Angels, while Joe Saunders gave up no runs off just four hits in the longest outing of his career to date. Anaheim hit three home runs in the final game, which proved just enough to power them to a 5–4 win.
- vs Texas Rangers – TEX won the series 2–1. Texas took two out of three against Anaheim, twice putting up double-digit scores. Friday night saw Texas take an 11–0 lead going into the bottom of the ninth inning, highlighted by Ben Broussard's grand slam and Josh Hamilton finishing the night a home run short of the cycle. In the bottom of the ninth, the Angels rallied for six runs. Torii Hunter, making his debut at Angel Stadium in an Angels uniform had two hits in the bottom of ninth, and the rally was ended when Garret Anderson hit a ball that was caught a few feet shy of the wall. Game 2 saw Jered Weaver beat Kevin Millwood (who lost in a complete game effort, Texas's first for 195 games.) in a pitching duel 2–1, pitching seven scoreless innings. Jon Garland struggled in his Game 3 start, giving up seven runs in five innings. Gerald Laird had a career night for the Rangers, going 4–5 with two home runs and six RBIs. Ben Broussard also went deep. Torii Hunter hit a home run for the Angels, as did Garret Anderson, his first of the season.
- vs Cleveland Indians – LAA won the series 2–1. In a series with both sides boasting much speed, home runs decided all three games of the series. Game 1 saw Torii Hunter hit a dramatic walk-off Grand Slam off closer Joe Borowski, after Francisco Rodríguez blew the save in the top of the ninth. Joe Saunders went eight innings for the second time in two starts, while Fausto Carmona pitched six strong innings. Game 2 saw another blown save for the Angels. Justin Speier was called on to close, as Rodríguez was ruled out due to an ankle injury. Travis Hafner hit a two-run homer to give the winning runs to the Indians. Jake Westbrook pitched a complete game to record the win. Vladimir Guerrero hit his first home run of the season during the game. This defeat ended a 163-game winning streak for the Angels where they had been ahead after eight innings. Anaheim comfortably won game 3, courtesy of a Mike Napoli grand slam, and other home runs from Vladimir Guerrero, Garret Anderson and Casey Kotchman.
- @ Seattle Mariners – SEA won the series 2–1. Raúl Ibañez stole the show in Game 1, hitting two home runs and a double, driving in three runs, chasing Jered Weaver to his second loss of the season. Game 2 saw Jon Garland struggle, conceding six runs and twelve hits in five innings. Ibanez was again on form, hitting a home run and getting three RBIs. Carlos Silva pitched eight solid innings to get the win. The final game saw the Angels offence come alive with a 16-hit attack. Howie Kendrick, Casey Kotchman and Jeff Mathis each got three hits. Cha Seung Baek was Seattle's starter, after Eric Bedard was ruled out with an inflamed left hip. Joe Saunders pitched into the sixth inning to continue his excellent start to the season.
- @ Texas Rangers – LAA won the series 2–0. In the first game, Ervin Santana recovered from a three-run first inning to shut down the rangers for the next six innings to improve his record to 2–0. Jason Jennings couldn't hold the lead and went to 0–3. Game 2 saw Gary Matthews, Jr. come back to his old ball-club and hit a game winning three RBI double to seal a sweep for the Angels. Despite Michael Young's 3–5 effort, the Angels bullpen was very solid, pitching five scoreless innings. In particular, Darren Oliver pitched 2 2/3 innings to pick up his first win of the season.
- vs Kansas City Royals – Series squared 1–1. Gil Meche and the Royals bullpen outduelled Jered Weaver to take the first game; Weaver's error to field a simple catch at first base cost a run that ended up deciding the result between the two teams. Jon Garland pitched solidly to win Game 2 for the Angels.
- vs Seattle Mariners – LAA won the series 2–1. Game 1 saw Torii Hunter take all the plaudits in his effort to give the Angels the win. He went 3–4 with three doubles and three RBIs. He also made a leaping catch at the wall to deny Richie Sexson a go-ahead home run and allow Francisco Rodríguez to gain his seventh save. Ervin Santana pitched eight dominant innings in Game 2, including eight strikeouts to ensure the Angels won the series. Dustin Moseley once again struggled in Game 3, failing to pitch five innings. Miguel Batista shutout the Angels with 7 2/3 innings. The Angels rallied with two runs in the ninth, but this wasn't enough to come back against the Mariners.
- @ Boston Red Sox – LAA won the series 2–1. This series was the first time the two teams met since the 2007 American League Division Series. The Angels bullpen failed to keep the Red Sox at bay in Game 1, as Jacoby Ellsbury hit two home runs and scored the go-ahead run in the eight to give the Red Sox the victory. Gary Matthews, Jr. hit two home runs in Game 2 behind Jon Garland's solid effort to tie the series at 1–1. Game 3 saw Joe Saunders continue his excellent start to the season, moving to 4–0. When Boston's bullpen entered the game, the Angels exploded with a four-run seventh inning to see off the Red Sox. Scot Shields attempted a two-inning save, but after giving up two runs to a David Ortiz home run in the ninth, Francisco Rodríguez was called on to get the final out to acquire his ninth save.
- @ Detroit Tigers – LAA won the series 2–1. The Angels' next visit was at the resurging Detroit Tigers, who were recovering from a 0–6 start. In Game 1, Nate Robertson pitched solidly for the Tigers, apart from a four-run fourth inning, highlighted by Vladimir Guerrero's two-run home run. The Angels bullpen once again proved very solid, backing up Ervin Santana's 6 1/3 inning effort to secure the win. Vladimir Guerrero hit his 2000th major league hit to break up a no-hitter from Armando Galarraga in Game 2, but it wasn't enough to stop the Tigers from winning. Game 3 featured on ESPN's Sunday Night Baseball, and saw a solid pitching performance from Jered Weaver to guide the Angels to the series victory. Torii Hunter and Casey Kotchman did the damage against Justin Verlander, each driving in three runs.
- vs Oakland Athletics – Series squared 2–2. In this AL West series, Oakland started strongly, roughing up Jon Garland and Chris Bootcheck for 14 runs over 6 2/3 innings in a 16-hit attack. Games 2 and 3 saw young starters Joe Saunders and Ervin Santana combine for 14 2/3 just giving up one run, moving both pitchers to 5–0 on the season. Game 4 saw the Oakland offence light up for 15 runs off 20 hits against debutant Nick Adenhart. For the Angels, Erick Aybar hit his first home run of the season, while Mike Napoli belted his second homer of the series, his seventh of the season.

=== May ===
- vs Baltimore Orioles – LAA won the series 2–1. Game 1 saw Jeremy Guthrie outduel Jered Weaver over the first seven innings. George Sherrill struggled to close the game, giving up one run, but forced Reggie Willits to pop-up to leave the bases loaded in the bottom of the ninth. Jon Garland pitched 8 strong innings in Game 2, limiting the Orioles to one run on three hits in order to earn the win for the Angels. Game 3 saw three home runs for the Angels, including a three-run homer from Torii Hunter to cap off a four-run first inning. This was enough to propel Joe Saunders to 6–0 for the season.
- @ Kansas City Royals – LAA won the series 2–1. Chone Figgins was placed on the Disabled List, thus the Angels were without their speedy leadoff hitter. Game 1 saw Ervin Santana improve to 6–0 with a complete game shut-out, with 9 strikeouts. He was matched toe-to-toe for the first seven innings by Brett Tomko. A four-run top of the ninth, punctuated with a 2-RBI home run by Garret Anderson gave the Halos the victory. Garret Anderson hit 5 RBIs in Game 2, including a 3-run home run off Brian Bannister and this was all the Angels needed to win Game 2. Nick Adenhart struggled again, giving up 11 baserunners over 4 1/3 innings, but the bullpen shutout the Royals for the rest of the game, with Francisco Rodríguez picking up his 17th save from 18 chances. With the Angels attempting the sweep in Game 3, Jered Weaver struggled, giving 8 runs in 3 1/3 innings. Garret Anderson hit a home run in his third straight game, although this was not enough to stop the Royals from winning.
- @ Tampa Bay Rays – TB won the series 3–0. James Shields started off the series with a one-hit shutout to give the high-flying Rays a 2–0 victory. Jon Garland matched him for eight innings, but Justin Speier gave up a two-run shot to Evan Longoria with one out in the ninth to take the loss. The Angels lost by the same score in Game 2, this time Scott Kazmir outduelled Joe Saunders to give the southpaw his first loss of the season. Former Angel Troy Percival earned his eighth save of the season. Game 3 saw the Angels score their first runs of the series, but an out-of-sorts Speier took his second loss of the series, giving up a 3-run shot to Carl Crawford in the 6th inning. The Angels 3-4-5 hitters went 7–12 with 5 RBIs, but this was not enough to topple the Rays.
- vs Chicago White Sox – Series squared 2–2. In Game 1, Vladimir Guerrero hit only his fourth home run of the season to help Nick Adenhart pick up his first victory in the Majors. Jered Weaver pitched seven scoreless innings in Game 2, but John Danks matched him. However, the Angels still won courtesy of a two-run eighth inning, with RBIs from Mike Napoli and Robb Quinlan. John Lackey made his first start of the season in Game 3, pitching seven innings giving up one run, matching José Contreras's effort for the Sox. However, Scot Shields failed to record an out while giving up four runs via a Carlos Quentin grand slam in the eighth inning. Game 4 saw Francisco Rodríguez pick up his first loss of the season, giving up an RBI single in the ninth to Jim Thome, who had been hitting only .199 for the season.
- vs Los Angeles Dodgers – LAA won the series 2–1. This series was the first of two Freeway series to be contested by the two teams this season. Game 1 saw Joe Saunders be the first pitcher to get to seven wins in the American League, pitching 7 1/3 strong innings. In Game 2, the Dodgers thwarted Ervin Santana's effort to join his teammate on seven wins, handing the young righty his first loss of the season. Offensively, Garret Anderson went 3–4, continuing his good form with the bat, he had hit .444 in his previous 12 games. The rubber game saw the Angels take the series, thanks largely to catcher Mike Napoli, who hit two home runs, got 5 RBIs and went 3–4 on the night. Maicer Izturis and Casey Kotchman also got three hits in the game.
- @ Toronto Blue Jays – LAA won the series 2–1. John Lackey picked up his first win of the season in Game 1, pitching seven strong innings. Francisco Rodríguez got his league-leading 18th save, despite giving up three walks in the ninth. Shawn Marcum felt the full force of Vladimir Guerrero's bat in Game 2, the slugger hit two home runs and got all 4 RBIs to ensure the Angels took the series with a game to spare. Game 3 saw Lyle Overbay hit a solo home run in the sixth inning to hand Ervin Santana his second consecutive loss by breaking a 3–3 tie.
- @ Chicago White Sox – LAA won the series 2–1. Los Angeles entered Chicago with the White Sox on a seven-game winning streak. Joe Saunders overcame sickness to end the streak, pitching 8 1/3 innings of one-run ball, which was enough to beat Gavin Floyd's complete game effort. Game 2 saw another low-scoring affair, this time Jered Weaver twirled eight scoreless innings, assisted by Vladimir Guerrero's seventh home run of the season. In the final game, John Lackey pitched into the ninth inning, following the efforts of Saunders and Weaver before him. However, his complete game effort was ended by Carlos Quentin's second home run of the night, as the slugger drove in all three RBIs to give the White Sox the victory behind José Contreras' eight-inning effort.
- vs Detroit Tigers – LAA won the series 2–1. Game 1 saw both offences stifled, both teams hitting a combined 0–24 with runners in scoring position. In the 12th inning, Garret Anderson drew a bases-loaded walk to give José Arredondo his first win of his major-league career. Miguel Cabrera's 8th home run of the season was the only blemish on Ervin Santana's complete game in Game 2, but he still picked up the victory, after Garret Anderson's 3–4 night and Gary Matthews, Jr.'s walk-off single. Joe Saunders struggled in the final game, giving up two home runs and four RBIs to Marcus Thames. Armando Galarraga continued his excellent start to his rookie season, pitching into the ninth inning and picking up the win.
- vs Toronto Blue Jays – LAA won the series 2–1. Lyle Overbay went 3–5 with two home runs and three RBIs to knock Jered Weaver out early, and highlighted a 10-run, 16-hit attack to beat the Angels in Game 1. John Lackey once again pitched into the eight inning in Game 2, but failed to get a decision despite the Angels getting 16 hits, including Maicer Izturis' 4–5 effort. In the end, Juan Rivera hit a walk-off single in the 10th to beat Blue Jays. In the rubber game, A. J. Burnett's eight-inning effort was wasted by B. J. Ryan's inability to close the game. He hit Howie Kendrick to force in the tying run, and Maicer Izturis singled in the winning run to give the Angels their fifth consecutive series win. Sean Rodriguez had earlier hit his first ever Major League home run to put the only runs up against Burnett.

=== Playoffs ===
The Angels beat the New York Yankees 4 to 2 on September 10, 2008, and about an hour later Seattle beat Texas which clinched the division for the Angels. With the Boston Red Sox securing the AL Wild Card, the Angels would have to face their old foes in the first round of the playoffs once again. The Red Sox swept the Angels in the division series in 2007 and 2004, but failed to do so in 2008.

- ALDS Game One

John Lackey gave up a 2-run homer to Jason Bay in the top of the sixth letting Boston take a lead they would not relinquish. Boston went on to win 4 to 2 marking the 10th straight playoff game the Angels lost to Boston. People now refer to this as the curse of Donnie Moore.

=== Game log ===
2008 game log
March (0–1)

#	Date	Opponent	Score	Win	Loss	Save	Stadium	Attendance	Record	GB
1	March 31	@ Twins	3–2	Hernández (1–0)	Weaver (0–1)	Nathan (1)	HHH Metrodome	49,596	0–1	-1

April (18–10)

#	Date	Opponent	Score	Win	Loss	Save	Stadium	Attendance	Record	GB
2	April 1	@ Twins	9–1	Garland (1–0)	Bonser (0–1)		HHH Metrodome	24,586	1–1	0
3	April 2	@ Twins	1–0	Saunders (1–0)	Blackburn (0–1)	Rodríguez (1)	HHH Metrodome	21,932	2–1	0
4	April 3	@ Twins	5–4	Santana (1–0)	Slowey (0–1)	Rodríguez (2)	HHH Metrodome	17,084	3–1	+½
5	April 4	Rangers	11–6	Gabbard (1–0)	Moseley (0–1)		Angel Stadium	43,838	3–2	+½
6	April 5	Rangers	2–1	Weaver (1–1)	Millwood (0–2)	Rodríguez (3)	Angel Stadium	41,170	4–2	+1
7	April 6	Rangers	10–4	Padilla (1–0)	Garland (1–1)		Angel Stadium	39,242	4–3	+½
8	April 7	Indians	6–4	Shields (1–0)	Borowski (0–1)		Angel Stadium	35,014	5–3	+1
9	April 8	Indians	4–3	Westbrook (1–1)	Speier (0–1)		Angel Stadium	37,587	5–4	+½
10	April 9	Indians	9–5	Moseley (1–1)	Byrd (0–2)		Angel Stadium	36,168	6–4	+½
11	April 11	@ Mariners	8–5	Hernández (1–0)	Weaver (1–2)	Lowe (1)	Safeco Field	28,915	6–5	-1
12	April 12	@ Mariners	8–3	Silva (2–0)	Garland (1–2)		Safeco Field	34,963	6–6	-2
13	April 13	@ Mariners	10–5	Saunders (2–0)	Baek (0–1)		Safeco Field	30,664	7–6	-1
14	April 14	@ Rangers	7–4	Santana (2–0)	Jennings (0–3)	Rodríguez (4)	Rangers Ballpark in Arlington	16,541	8–6	-1
15	April 15	@ Rangers	7–4	Oliver (1–0)	Rupe (0–1)	Rodríguez (5)	Rangers Ballpark in Arlington	15,595	9–6	0
16	April 16	Royals	3–2	Meche (1–2)	Weaver (1–3)	Soria (5)	Angel Stadium	41,336	9–7	0
17	April 17	Royals	5–3	Garland (2–2)	Tomko (1–2)	Rodríguez (6)	Angel Stadium	40,021	10–7	+1
18	April 18	Mariners	5–4	Saunders (3–0)	Dickey (0–1)	Rodríguez (7)	Angel Stadium	43,939	11–7	+1
19	April 19	Mariners	4–1	Santana (3–0)	Washburn (1–3)	Shields (1)	Angel Stadium	43,959	12–7	+1
20	April 20	Mariners	4–2	Batista (2–2)	Moseley (1–2)	Rowland-Smith (2)	Angel Stadium	43,631	12–8	0
21	April 22	@ Red Sox	7–6	Timlin (2–1)	Oliver (1–1)	Papelbon (8)	Fenway Park	37,982	12–9	0
22	April 23	@ Red Sox	6–4	Garland (3–2)	Hansen (0–1)	Rodríguez (8)	Fenway Park	38,172	13–9	0
23	April 24	@ Red Sox	7–5	Saunders (4–0)	Delcarmen (0–1)	Rodríguez (9)	Fenway Park	37,848	14–9	0
24	April 25	@ Tigers	4–3	Santana (4–0)	Robertson (0–3)	Rodríguez (10)	Comerica Park	40,380	15–9	0
25	April 26	@ Tigers	6–4	López (2–0)	O'Day (0–1)	Jones (4)	Comerica Park	42,068	15–10	0
26	April 27	@ Tigers	6–2	Weaver (2–3)	Verlander (1–4)		Comerica Park	36,347	16–10	0
27	April 28	Athletics	14–2	Gaudin (3–1)	Garland (3–3)		Angel Stadium	37,725	16–11	-1
28	April 29	Athletics	2–0	Saunders (5–0)	Smith (1–2)	Rodríguez (11)	Angel Stadium	35,764	17–11	0
29	April 30	Athletics	6–1	Santana (5–0)	Eveland (3–2)		Angel Stadium	35,301	18–11	+1

May (15–13)

#	Date	Opponent	Score	Win	Loss	Save	Stadium	Attendance	Record	GB
30	May 1	Athletics	15–8	Duchscherer (2–1)	Moseley (1–3)		Angel Stadium	37,396	18–12	0
31	May 2	Orioles	4–3	Guthrie (1–3)	Weaver (2–4)	Sherrill (11)	Angel Stadium	41,515	18–13	0
32	May 3	Orioles	3–1	Garland (4–3)	Cabrera (2–1)	Rodríguez (12)	Angel Stadium	37,601	19–13	+1
33	May 4	Orioles	6–5	Saunders (6–0)	Trachsel (1–4)	Rodríguez (13)	Angel Stadium	39,273	20–13	+1
34	May 5	@ Royals	4–0	Santana (6–0)	R. Ramírez (0–1)		Kauffman Stadium	12,157	21–13	+1
35	May 6	@ Royals	5–3	Oliver (2–1)	Bannister (3–4)	Rodríguez (14)	Kauffman Stadium	11,354	22–13	+1
36	May 7	@ Royals	9–4	Greinke (4–1)	Weaver (2–5)		Kauffman Stadium	11,084	22–14	0
37	May 9	@ Rays	2–0	Shields (4–2)	Speier (0–2)		Tropicana Field	12,039	22–15	0
38	May 10	@ Rays	2–0	Kazmir (1–1)	Saunders (6–1)	Percival (8)	Tropicana Field	25,512	22–16	0
39	May 11	@ Rays	8–5	Howell (2–0)	Speier (0–3)	Percival (9)	Tropicana Field	13,010	22–17	-1
40	May 12	White Sox	10–7	Adenhart (1–0)	Buehrle (1–5)	Rodríguez (15)	Angel Stadium	38,723	23–17	-½
41	May 13	White Sox	2–0	Shields (2–0)	Dotel (1–2)	Rodríguez (16)	Angel Stadium	35,333	24–17	+½
42	May 14	White Sox	6–1	Contreras (4–3)	Shields (2–1)		Angel Stadium	37,059	24–18	+½
43	May 15	White Sox	4–3	Dotel (2–2)	Rodríguez (0–1)	Jenks (8)	Angel Stadium	41,444	24–19	+½
44	May 16	Dodgers	4–2	Saunders (7–1)	Kuroda (1–3)	Rodríguez (17)	Angel Stadium	44,047	25–19	+1½
45	May 17	Dodgers	6–3	Kuo (3–1)	Santana (6–1)		Angel Stadium	43,906	25–20	+½
46	May 18	Dodgers	10–2	Weaver (3–5)	Lowe (2–4)		Angel Stadium	44,007	26–20	+1½
47	May 20	@ Blue Jays	3–1	Lackey (1–0)	McGowan (2–4)	Rodríguez (18)	Rogers Centre	31,487	27–20	+3
48	May 21	@ Blue Jays	4–3	Garland (5–3)	Marcum (4–3)	Rodríguez (19)	Rogers Centre	20,163	28–20	+3
49	May 22	@ Blue Jays	4–3	Burnett (5–4)	Santana (6–2)	Ryan (10)	Rogers Centre	22,007	28–21	+2½
50	May 23	@ White Sox	3–1	Saunders (8–1)	Floyd (4–3)	Rodríguez (20)	U.S. Cellular Field	28,156	29–21	+2½
51	May 24	@ White Sox	2–0	Weaver (4–5)	Danks (3–4)	Rodríguez (21)	U.S. Cellular Field	38,434	30–21	+2½
52	May 25	@ White Sox	3–2	Linebrink (2–0)	Lackey (1–1)		U.S. Cellular Field	36,195	30–22	+1½
53	May 26	Tigers	1–0 (12)	Arredondo (1–0)	Dolsi (0–1)		Angel Stadium	41,031	31–22	+2
54	May 27	Tigers	3–2	Santana (7–2)	López (2–1)		Angel Stadium	36,569	32–22	+2
55	May 28	Tigers	6–2	Galarraga (4–2)	Saunders (8–2)		Angel Stadium	42,191	32–23	+2
56	May 30	Blue Jays	10–4	McGowan (4–4)	Weaver (4–6)		Angel Stadium	42,577	32–24	+2½
57	May 31	Blue Jays	3–2(10)	Shields (3–1)	Tallet (0–1)		Angel Stadium	43,645	33–24	+3½

June (16–10)

#	Date	Opponent	Score	Win	Loss	Save	Stadium	Attendance	Record	GB
58	June 1	Blue Jays	4–3	Arredondo (2–0)	Ryan (1–1)		Angel Stadium	40,026	34–24	+3½
59	June 2	@ Mariners	4–2	Santana (8–2)	Washburn (2–7)	Rodríguez (22)	Safeco Field	22,110	35–24	+3½
60	June 3	@ Mariners	5–4	Saunders (9–2)	Bedard (4–4)	Rodríguez (23)	Safeco Field	23,354	36–24	+3½
61	June 4	@ Mariners	5–4	Weaver (5–6)	Silva (3–6)	Rodríguez (24)	Safeco Field	32,774	37–24	+3½
62	June 6	@ Athletics	3–1	Lackey (2–1)	Blanton (3–8)	Rodríguez (25)	McAfee Coliseum	25,120	38–24	+4½
63	June 7	@ Athletics	5–3	Garland (6–3)	Smith (3–5)	Rodríguez (26)	McAfee Coliseum	29,294	39–24	+5½
64	June 8	@ Athletics	7–3 (12)	Ziegler (1–0)	Bootcheck (0–1)		McAfee Coliseum	26,332	39–25	+4½
65	June 9	Rays	13–4	Jackson (4–5)	Saunders (9–3)		Angel Stadium	42,019	39–26	+4
66	June 10	Rays	6–1	Weaver (6–6)	Shields (4–5)		Angel Stadium	37,610	40–26	+5
67	June 11	Rays	4–2	Lackey (3–1)	Kazmir (6–2)	Rodríguez (27)	Angel Stadium	36,622	41–26	+5
68	June 13	Braves	5–2	Reyes (3–4)	Garland (6–4)	Bennett (2)	Angel Stadium	43,919	41–27	+4½
69	June 14	Braves	9–4	Morton (1–0)	Santana (8–3)		Angel Stadium	43,894	41–28	+3½
70	June 15	Braves	2–0	Saunders (10–3)	Campillo (2–1)	Rodríguez (28)	Angel Stadium	43,723	41–29	+3½
71	June 16	Mets	9–6	Pelfrey (3–6)	Weaver (6–7)	Wagner (15)	Angel Stadium	39,229	42–29	+3
72	June 17	Mets	6–1	Lackey (4–1)	Santana (7–5)	Shields (2)	Angel Stadium	40,122	43–29	+3
73	June 18	Mets	5–4 (10)	Sánchez (3–0)	Speier (0–4)	Wagner (16)	Angel Stadium	43,138	43–30	+3
74	June 20	@ Phillies	7–1	Santana (9–3)	Eaton (2–5)		Citizens Bank Park	45,033	44–30	+3½
75	June 21	@ Phillies	6–2	Saunders (11–3)	Myers (3–9)	Rodríguez (29)	Citizens Bank Park	45,196	45–30	+4½
76	June 22	@ Phillies	3–2	Weaver (7–7)	Hamels (7–5)	Rodríguez (30)	Citizens Bank Park	44,571	46–30	+4½
77	June 23	@ Nationals	3–2	Lackey (5–1)	Rivera (3–4)	Rodríguez (31)	Nationals Park	24,805	47–30	+5
78	June 24	@ Nationals	8–3	Garland (7–4)	Hill (1–5)		Nationals Park	28,351	48–30	+5
79	June 25	@ Nationals	5–4	Rauch (4–1)	Shields (3–2)		Nationals Park	29,180	48–31	+5
80	June 27	@ Dodgers	6–0	Park (3–2)	Saunders (11–4)		Dodger Stadium	50,419	48–32	+3½
81	June 28	@ Dodgers	1–0	Billingsley (7–7)	Weaver (7–8)	Saito (12)	Dodger Stadium	55,784	48–33	+3½
82	June 29	@ Dodgers	1–0	Lackey (6–1)	Lowe (5–8)	Rodríguez (32)	Dodger Stadium	48,155	49–33	+4½
83	June 30	Athletics	6–1	Smith (5–6)	Garland (7–5)		Angel Stadium	42,046	49–34	+12½

July (19–6)

#	Date	Opponent	Score	Win	Loss	Save	Stadium	Attendance	Record	GB
84	July 1	Athletics	6–5	Shields (4–2)	Embree (1–3)	Rodríguez (33)	Angel Stadium	42,047	50–34	+4½
85	July 2	Athletics	7–4	Saunders (12–4)	Foulke (0–3)	Rodríguez (34)	Angel Stadium	41,091	51–34	+5½
86	July 4	Blue Jays	8–2	Weaver (8–8)	Burnett (8–8)		Angel Stadium	44,021	52–34	+5
87	July 5	Blue Jays	7–5	Halladay (10–4)	Lackey (6–2)		Angel Stadium	43,767	52–35	+5
88	July 6	Blue Jays	7–1	Garland (8–5)	Litsch (8–5)		Angel Stadium	41,026	53–35	+6
89	July 7	@ Rangers	9–6	Santana (10–3)	Mendoza (1–3)	Rodríguez (35)	Rangers Ballpark in Arlington	21,170	54–35	+6
90	July 8	@ Rangers	3–2	Harrison (1–0)	Saunders (12–5)	Wilson (22)	Rangers Ballpark in Arlington	18,788	54–36	+5
91	July 9	@ Rangers	5–4	Wright (5–3)	Rodríguez (0–2)		Rangers Ballpark in Arlington	24,515	54–37	+5
92	July 10	@ Rangers	11-10 (11)	Speier (1–4)	Wright (5–4)	Rodríguez (36)	Rangers Ballpark in Arlington	23,262	55–37	+5
93	July 11	@ Athletics	9–2	Gallagher (4–4)	Garland (8–6)		McAfee Coliseum	31,372	55–38	+4
94	July 12	@ Athletics	4–1	Santana (11–3)	Eveland (7–6)	Rodríguez (37)	McAfee Coliseum	27,161	56–38	+5
95	July 13	@ Athletics	4–3	Arredondo (3–0)	Street (2–3)	Rodríguez (38)	McAfee Coliseum	29,352	57–38	+6
July 15: All-Star Game (AL wins, 4–3)				Kazmir (TB)	Lidge (PHI)		Yankee Stadium	55,632	New York City	
96	July 18	Red Sox	11–3	Lackey (7–2)	Buchholz (2–5)		Angel Stadium	44,260	58–38	+7
97	July 19	Red Sox	4–2	Arredondo (4–0)	Beckett (9–6)	Rodríguez (39)	Angel Stadium	44,005	59–38	+8
98	July 20	Red Sox	5–3	Oliver (3–1)	Wakefield (6–7)	Rodríguez (40)	Angel Stadium	44,164	60–38	+9
99	July 21	Indians	5–2	Byrd (4–10)	Santana (11–4)	Kobayashi (6)	Angel Stadium	43,037	60–39	+8½
100	July 22	Indians	3–2	Oliver (4–1)	Ginter (1–1)	Rodríguez (41)	Angel Stadium	43,505	61–39	+9
101	July 23	Indians	14–11	Lackey (8–2)	Laffey (5–7)	Rodríguez (42)	Angel Stadium	42,187	62–39	+10
102	July 25	@ Orioles	6–5	Saunders (13–5)	Burres (7–7)	Rodríguez (43)	Oriole Park at Camden Yards	27,999	63–39	+10½
103	July 26	@ Orioles	11–6	Garland (9–6)	Liz (4–3)		Oriole Park at Camden Yards	21,819	64–39	+10½
104	July 27	@ Orioles	5–2	Olson (7–5)	Santana (11–5)	Sherrill (30)	Oriole Park at Camden Yards	23,365	64–40	+10½
105	July 28	@ Red Sox	7–5	Weaver (9–8)	Matsuzaka (11–2)	Rodríguez (44)	Fenway Park	37,830	65–40	+11½
106	July 29	@ Red Sox	6–2	Lackey (9–2)	Buchholz (2–6)		Fenway Park	38,110	66–40	+11½
107	July 30	@ Red Sox	9–2	Saunders (14–5)	Beckett (9–8)		Fenway Park	38,042	67–40	+11½
108	July 31	@ Yankees	12–6	Garland (10–6)	Pettitte (12–8)		Yankee Stadium	53,405	68–40	+12½

August (15–13)

#	Date	Opponent	Score	Win	Loss	Save	Stadium	Attendance	Record	GB
109	August 1	@ Yankees	1–0	Santana (12–5)	Rivera (4–4)	Rodríguez (45)	Yankee Stadium	53,997	69–40	+12½
110	August 2	@ Yankees	9–2	Mussina (14–6)	Weaver (9–9)		Yankee Stadium	54,170	69–41	+12½
111	August 3	@ Yankees	14–9	E. Ramírez (3–0)	Shields (4–3)		Yankee Stadium	54,204	69–42	+11½
112	August 4	Orioles	6–5	Rodríguez (1–2)	Sherrill (3–5)		Angel Stadium	41,902	70–42	+11½
113	August 5	Orioles	3–0	Waters (1–0)	Garland (10–7)	Sherrill (31)	Angel Stadium	44,027	70–43	+10½
114	August 6	Orioles	9–4	Santana (13–5)	Olson (8–6)		Angel Stadium	40,130	71–43	+11½
115	August 8	Yankees	10–5	Weaver (10–9)	Kennedy (0–4)		Angel Stadium	44,158	72–43	+13
116	August 9	Yankees	11–4	Shields (5–3)	E. Ramírez (3–1)		Angel Stadium	43,919	73–43	+14
117	August 10	Yankees	4–3	Rodríguez (2–2)	Marte (4–2)		Angel Stadium	44,138	74–43	+14
118	August 12	Mariners	7–3	Garland (11–7)	Washburn (5–12)	Rodríguez (46)	Angel Stadium	42,086	75–43	+15
119	August 13	Mariners	10–7 (12)	Corcoran (3–0)	Speier (1–5)		Angel Stadium	42,754	75–44	+15
120	August 15	@ Indians	3–2	Lee (17–2)	Arredondo (4–1)		Progressive Field	30,962	75–45	+15½
121	August 16	@ Indians	4–3	Lackey (10–2)	Carmona (5–5)	Rodríguez (47)	Progressive Field	33,051	76–45	+15½
122	August 17	@ Indians	4–3	Sowers (2–6)	Speier (1–6)	Lewis (3)	Progressive Field	28,356	76–46	+15½
123	August 18	@ Rays	6–4	Sonnanstine (13–6)	Garland (11–8)	Wheeler (6)	Tropicana Field	15,896	76–47	+15½
124	August 19	@ Rays	4–2	Shields (11–7)	Shields (5–4)	Wheeler (7)	Tropicana Field	15,902	76–48	+15½
125	August 20	@ Rays	5–4	Arredondo (5–1)	Balfour (3–2)	Rodríguez (48)	Tropicana Field	19,157	77–48	+15½
126	August 21	Twins	2–1 (12)	Crain (5–2)	Speier (1–7)	Nathan (35)	Angel Stadium	41,367	77–49	+15
127	August 22	Twins	9–0	Perkins (11–3)	Saunders (14–6)		Angel Stadium	43,819	77–50	+15
128	August 23	Twins	7–5	Oliver (5–1)	Blackburn (9–8)	Rodríguez (49)	Angel Stadium	43,906	78–50	+16
129	August 24	Twins	5–3	Arredondo (6–1)	Crain (5–3)	Rodríguez (50)	Angel Stadium	40,011	79–50	+17
130	August 25	Athletics	2–1	Braden (4–3)	Weaver (10–10)	Ziegler (5)	Angel Stadium	39,584	79–51	+16
131	August 26	Athletics	5–1	Lackey (11–2)	Smith (6–13)		Angel Stadium	37,431	80–51	+16
132	August 27	Athletics	6–5	Street (4–5)	Saunders (14–7)	Ziegler (6)	Angel Stadium	38,587	80–52	+15
133	August 28	Rangers	7–5	Garland (12–8)	Wright (6–6)	Rodríguez (51)	Angel Stadium	37,541	81–52	+16
134	August 29	Rangers	3–1	Santana (14–5)	Nippert (1–4)	Rodríguez (52)	Angel Stadium	40,084	82–52	+17
135	August 30	Rangers	4–3	Arredondo (7–1)	Feldman (5–6)	Rodríguez (53)	Angel Stadium	43,937	83–52	+18
136	August 31	Rangers	4–3	Millwood (9–7)	Lackey (11–3)	Francisco (2)	Angel Stadium	39,153	83–53	+17

September (17–9)

#	Date	Opponent	Score	Win	Loss	Save	Stadium	Attendance	Record	GB
137	September 2	@ Tigers	5–4	Shields (6–4)	Rodney (0–4)	Rodríguez (54)	Comerica Park	35,320	84–53	+17½
138	September 3	@ Tigers	9–6	Farnsworth (2–2)	Arredondo (7–2)	Rodney (8)	Comerica Park	36,671	84–54	+16½
139	September 4	@ Tigers	7–1	Santana (15–5)	Rogers (9–13)		Comerica Park	37,890	85–54	+17
140	September 5	@ White Sox	10–2	Buehrle (12–11)	Moseley (1–4)		U.S. Cellular Field	32,502	85–55	+17
141	September 6	@ White Sox	7–6 (15)	Wassermanm (1–1)	Speier (1–8)		U.S. Cellular Field	31,046	85–56	+16
142	September 7	@ White Sox	3–2	Saunders (15–7)	H. Ramírez (1–4)	Rodríguez (55)	U.S. Cellular Field	26,029	86–56	+17
143	September 8	Yankees	12–1	Garland (13–8)	Pavano (2–1)		Angel Stadium	41,025	87–56	+17½
144	September 9	Yankees	7–1	Aceves (1–0)	Santana (15–6)		Angel Stadium	43,042	87–57	+16½
145	y-September 10	Yankees	4–2	Moseley (2–4)	Pettitte (13–13)	Rodríguez (56)	Angel Stadium	39,783	88–57	+17½
146	September 11	Mariners	7–4	Weaver (11–10)	Morrow (2–3)	Rodríguez (57)	Angel Stadium	38,205	89–57	+17½
147	September 12	Mariners	5–3	Arredondo (8–2)	Batista (4–13)		Angel Stadium	43,743	90–57	+17½
148	September 13	Mariners	5–2	Garland (14–8)	Feierabend (1–3)	Rodríguez (58)	Angel Stadium	43,757	91–57	+18½
149	September 14	Mariners	4–3	Arredondo (9–2)	Corcoran (5–1)		Angel Stadium	41,528	92–57	+19½
150	September 16	@ Athletics	8–1	Gallagher (5–6)	Lackey (11–4)		McAfee Coliseum	14,325	92–58	+18
151	September 17	@ Athletics	3–2	Ziegler (2–0)	Rodríguez (2–3)		McAfee Coliseum	20,102	92–59	+18
152	September 18	@ Athletics	6–4	Saunders (16–7)	Outman (1–1)	Rodríguez (59)	McAfee Coliseum	12,645	93–59	+18½
153	September 19	@ Rangers	15–13	Oliver (6–1)	Wright (7–7)	Shields (3)	Rangers Ballpark in Arlington	23,708	94–59	+19½
154	September 20	@ Rangers	7–3	Speier (2–8)	Padilla (13–8)	Rodríguez (60)	Rangers Ballpark in Arlington	38,973	95–59	+20½
155	September 21	@ Rangers	7–3	Lackey (12–4)	Feldman (5–8)		Rangers Ballpark in Arlington	28,390	96–59	+21½
156	September 22	@ Mariners	2–1	Santana (16–6)	Rowland-Smith (4–3)	Rodríguez (61)	Safeco Field	19,717	97–59	+22
157	September 23	@ Mariners	9–6	Corcoran (6–2)	Jepsen (0–1)	Putz (14)	Safeco Field	19,065	97–60	+21½
158	September 24	@ Mariners	6–5	Oliver (7–1)	Lowe (1–5)	Rodríguez (62)	Safeco Field	19,015	98–60	+21½
159	September 25	@ Mariners	6–4	Arredondo (10–2)	Putz (6–5)	Shields (4)	Safeco Field	16,939	99–60	+22
160	z-September 26	Rangers	12–1	Padilla (14–8)	Lackey (12–5)		Angel Stadium	43,758	99–61	+21
161	September 27	Rangers	8–4	Feldman (6–8)	Santana (16–7)		Angel Stadium	43,141	99–62	+20
162	September 28	Rangers	7–0	Saunders (17–7)	Millwood (9–10)		Angel Stadium	43,761	100–62	+21

== Player stats ==
=== Batting ===
==== Main hitters ====
Includes those who qualify for the batting title.
Only includes statistics obtained while playing for LAA. Casey Kotchman was traded to the Atlanta Braves for Mark Teixeira on July 28.
Note: G = Games played; AB = At bats; H = Hits; Avg. = Batting average; HR = Home runs; RBI = Runs batted in

Player	G	AB	H	Avg.	HR	RBI
Mark Teixeira	54	193	69	.358	13	43
Vladimir Guerrero	143	541	164	.303	27	91
Garret Anderson	145	557	163	.293	15	84
Casey Kotchman	100	373	107	.287	12	54
Torii Hunter	146	551	153	.278	21	78
Chone Figgins	116	453	125	.276	1	22

==== Other hitters ====
Note: G = Games played; AB = At bats; H = Hits; Avg. = Batting average; HR = Home runs; RBI = Runs batted in

Player	G	AB	H	Avg.	HR	RBI
Howie Kendrick	92	340	104	.306	3	37
Erick Aybar	98	346	96	.277	3	39
Mike Napoli	78	227	62	.273	20	49
Maicer Izturis	79	290	78	.269	3	37
Robb Quinlan	68	164	43	.262	1	11
Juan Rivera	89	256	63	.246	12	45
Gary Matthews, Jr.	127	426	103	.242	8	46
Kendry Morales	27	61	13	.213	3	8
Sean Rodriguez	59	167	34	.204	3	10
Brandon Wood	55	150	30	.200	5	13
Jeff Mathis	94	283	55	.194	9	42
Reggie Willits	82	108	21	.194	0	7
Freddy Sandoval	6	6	1	.167	0	0
Bobby Wilson	7	6	1	.167	0	1
Matthew Brown	11	19	1	.053	0	3
Ryan Budde	8	2	0	.000	0	0
Jon Garland	1	2	0	.000	0	1
Joe Saunders	2	3	0	.000	0	0
Jered Weaver	2	4	0	.000	0	0
John Lackey	2	6	0	.000	0	0
Ervin Santana	2	6	0	.000	0	0
Total Batting	162	5540	1486	.268	159	721

Note: Pitchers batting data included above

=== Starting pitchers ===
Note: GS = Games started; IP = Innings pitched; W = Wins; L = Losses; ERA = Earned run average; SO = Strikeouts

Player	GS	IP	W	L	ERA	SO
Joe Saunders	31	198.0	17	7	3.41	103
Ervin Santana	32	219.0	16	7	3.49	214
John Lackey	24	163.1	12	5	3.75	130
Jered Weaver	30	176.2	11	10	4.33	152
Jon Garland	32	196.2	14	8	4.90	90
Dustin Moseley	12 (10 starts)	50.1	2	4	6.79	37
Nick Adenhart	3	12.0	1	0	9.00	4
Combined totals	162	1012.0	73	40	4.14	727

=== Relief pitchers ===
Note: G = Games pitched; IP = Innings pitched; W = Wins; L = Losses; SV = Saves; H = Holds; ERA = Earned run average; SO = Strikeouts

Player	G	IP	W	L	SV	H	ERA	SO
Alex Serrano	1	1.0	0	0	0	0	0.00	1
José Arredondo	52	61.0	10	2	0	16	1.62	55
Francisco Rodríguez	76	68.1	2	3	62	0	2.24	77
Scot Shields	64	63.1	6	4	4	31	2.70	64
Shane Loux	7	16.0	0	0	0	0	2.81	4
Darren Oliver	54	72.0	7	1	0	12	2.88	48
Kevin Jepsen	9	8.1	0	1	0	3	4.32	7
Darren O'Day	30	43.1	0	1	0	1	4.57	29
Justin Speier	62	68.0	2	8	0	10	5.03	56
Jason Bulger	14	16.0	0	0	0	0	7.31	20
Chris Bootcheck	10	16.0	0	1	0	1	10.13	14
Rich Thompson	2	2.0	0	0	0	0	22.50	1
Combined totals	383	439.1	27	22	66	74	3.69	379

== Playoffs ==
=== Game log ===
2008 postseason game log
American League Division Series (1–3)

#	Date	Opponent	Score	Win	Loss	Save	Stadium	Attendance	Record	Box
1	October 1	Red Sox	4–1	Lester (1–0)	Lackey (0–1)	Papelbon (1)	Angel Stadium of Anaheim	44,996	0–1	
2	October 3	Red Sox	7–5	Papelbon (1–0)	Rodríguez (0–1)		Angel Stadium of Anaheim	43,354	0–2	
3	October 5	@ Red Sox	5–4 (12)	Weaver (1–0)	López (0–1)		Fenway Park	39,067	1–2	
4	October 6	@ Red Sox	3–2	Delcarmen (1–0)	Shields (0–1)		Fenway Park	38,785	1–3	

=== Statistics ===
==== Postseason batting and pitching statistics ====
Note: G = Games played; AB = At bats; H = Hits; Avg. = Batting average; HR = Home runs; RBI = Runs batted in

Player	G	AB	H	Avg.	HR	RBI
Jeff Mathis	1	2	1	.500	0	0
Kendry Morales	4	4	2	.500	0	0
Vladimir Guerrero	4	15	7	.467	0	0
Mark Teixeira	4	15	7	.467	0	1
Torii Hunter	4	18	7	.389	0	5
Chone Figgins	4	21	7	.333	0	1
Mike Napoli	4	12	3	.250	2	4
Garret Anderson	4	19	3	.158	0	0
Juan Rivera	3	8	1	.125	0	1
Howie Kendrick	4	17	2	.118	0	0
Erick Aybar	4	18	2	.111	0	1
Reggie Willits	3	0	0	.000	0	0
Gary Matthews, Jr.	3	5	0	.000	0	0
Total hitting	46	154	42	.273	2	13

==== Starting pitchers ====
Note: GS = Games Started; IP = Innings pitched; W = Wins; L = Losses; ERA = Earned run average; SO = Strikeouts

Player	GS	IP	W	L	ERA	SO
John Lackey	2	13.2	0	1	2.63	6
Joe Saunders	1	4.2	0	0	7.71	2
Ervin Santana	1	5.1	0	0	8.44	3
Combined totals	4	23.2	0	1	4.94	11

==== Relief pitchers ====
Note: G = Games pitched; IP = Innings pitched; W = Wins; L = Losses; SV = Saves; H = Holds; ERA = Earned run average; SO = Strikeouts

Player	G	IP	W	L	SV	H	ERA	SO
José Arredondo	3	3.2	0	0	0	0	0.00	4
Jered Weaver	1	2.0	1	0	0	0	0.00	3
Darren Oliver	2	1.1	0	0	0	0	0.00	1
Scot Shields	4	5.2	0	1	0	0	4.76	7
Francisco Rodríguez	2	2.1	0	1	0	0	7.71	2
Combined totals	12	15.0	1	2	0	0	3.00	17

== Farm system ==
Level	Team	League	Manager
AAA	Salt Lake Bees	Pacific Coast League	Bobby Mitchell
AA	Arkansas Travelers	Texas League	Bobby Magallanes
A	Rancho Cucamonga Quakes	California League	Ever Magallanes
A	Cedar Rapids Kernels	Midwest League	Keith Johnson
Rookie	AZL Angels	Arizona League	Tyrone Boykin
Rookie	Orem Owlz	Pioneer League	Tom Kotchman

LEAGUE CHAMPIONS: Arkansas

== See also ==
- Los Angeles Angels
- Angel Stadium
- 2008 MLB season

=== Other Anaheim-based teams in 2008 ===
- Anaheim Ducks (Honda Center)
  - 2007–08 Anaheim Ducks season
  - 2008–09 Anaheim Ducks season

Records
Preceded by 2007	Los Angeles Angels seasons 2008	Succeeded by 2009
