= Álex Serrano =

Álex Serrano may refer to:

- Álex Serrano (footballer) (born 1995), Spanish footballer
- Alex Serrano (baseball) (born 1981), Major League Baseball relief pitcher
