= Izturis =

Izturis is the surname of two Venezuelan brothers, who both play in Major League Baseball:

- César Izturis (born February 10, 1980), baseball shortstop
- Maicer Izturis (born September 12, 1980), baseball infielder
