= Maicer Izturis =

Venezuelan baseball player (born 1980)

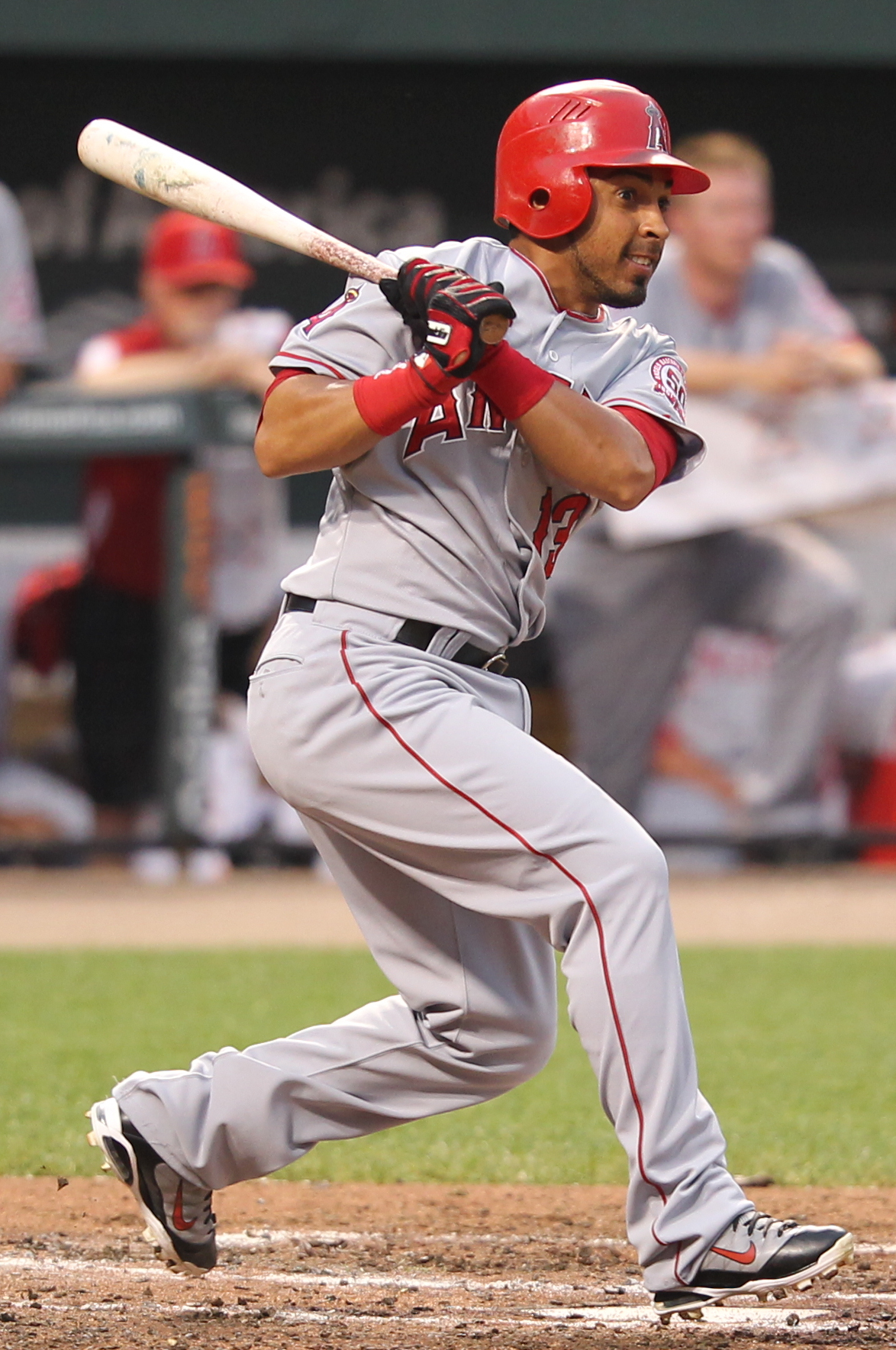
- Izturis with the Los Angeles Angels of Anaheim in 2011
- Infielder
- Born: September 12, 1980 (age 46); Barquisimeto, Lara State, Venezuela
- Batted: Switch Threw: Right

MLB debut
- August 27, 2004, for the Montreal Expos

Last MLB appearance
- April 13, 2014, for the Toronto Blue Jays

MLB statistics
- Batting average: .269
- Home runs: 39
- Runs batted in: 334
- Stats at Baseball Reference

Teams
- Montreal Expos (2004); Los Angeles Angels of Anaheim (2005–2012); Toronto Blue Jays (2013–2014)

Maicer Eduardo Izturis (/ˈmaɪsɛər ɪsˈtʊərɪs/; born September 12, 1980) is a Venezuelan former professional baseball infielder. During his career he played for the Montreal Expos, Los Angeles Angels of Anaheim, and the Toronto Blue Jays of Major League Baseball (MLB). Izturis is the half brother of shortstop César Izturis and minor league shortstop Julio Izturis.

== Professional career ==
=== Montreal Expos ===
Izturis was signed by the Cleveland Indians as a non-drafted free agent on April 1, 1998. He and Ryan Church were traded to the Montreal Expos for Scott Stewart on January 5, 2004.

In 2004, Izturis hit .338 with three home runs and 36 RBI for the Triple-A Edmonton Trappers before being promoted to the Major League level with the Montreal Expos. He registered a hit in his August 27, 2004 debut, singling off San Diego Padres right-hander Dennis Tankersley in the second inning. In 32 games with the Expos, Izturis hit .206 (22-for-107) with one home run and 14 RBI.

=== Los Angeles Angels of Anaheim ===
On November 19, 2004, Izturis was traded to the Los Angeles Angels of Anaheim along with outfielder Juan Rivera for outfielder José Guillén.

Though a shortstop by trade, Gold Glove winner Orlando Cabrera was already at shortstop on the Angels roster, relegating Izturis to the role of a utility infielder. After the placement of veteran Darin Erstad on the disabled list, the Angels moved star utilityman Chone Figgins to center field during the 2006 campaign, and Izturis emerged as the club's starting third baseman, until the Angels signed Gary Matthews, Jr. to start in center field for the 2007 season, forcing Figgins back to third base.

In a game against the Cleveland Indians on July 17, 2006, he had a career high four hits in one game, going 4–5 with 1 RBI and 3 runs.

On January 25, 2010, the Angels signed Izturis to a three-year contract worth $10 million, avoiding arbitration. FanGraphs' Matthew Carruth called it a "fantastic deal" at "an insanely discounted rate" estimating his market value at about $20 million over three years. Baseball Prospectus called the deal a good 'insurance policy', adding, "he's a good enough offensive contributor to add value whatever the position among second, short, and third, and a good enough defender at any of them to be playable".

After Scot Shields' retirement following the 2010 season, as well as the trade of Juan Rivera to the Toronto Blue Jays, Izturis became the longest-tenured Angel.

=== Toronto Blue Jays ===
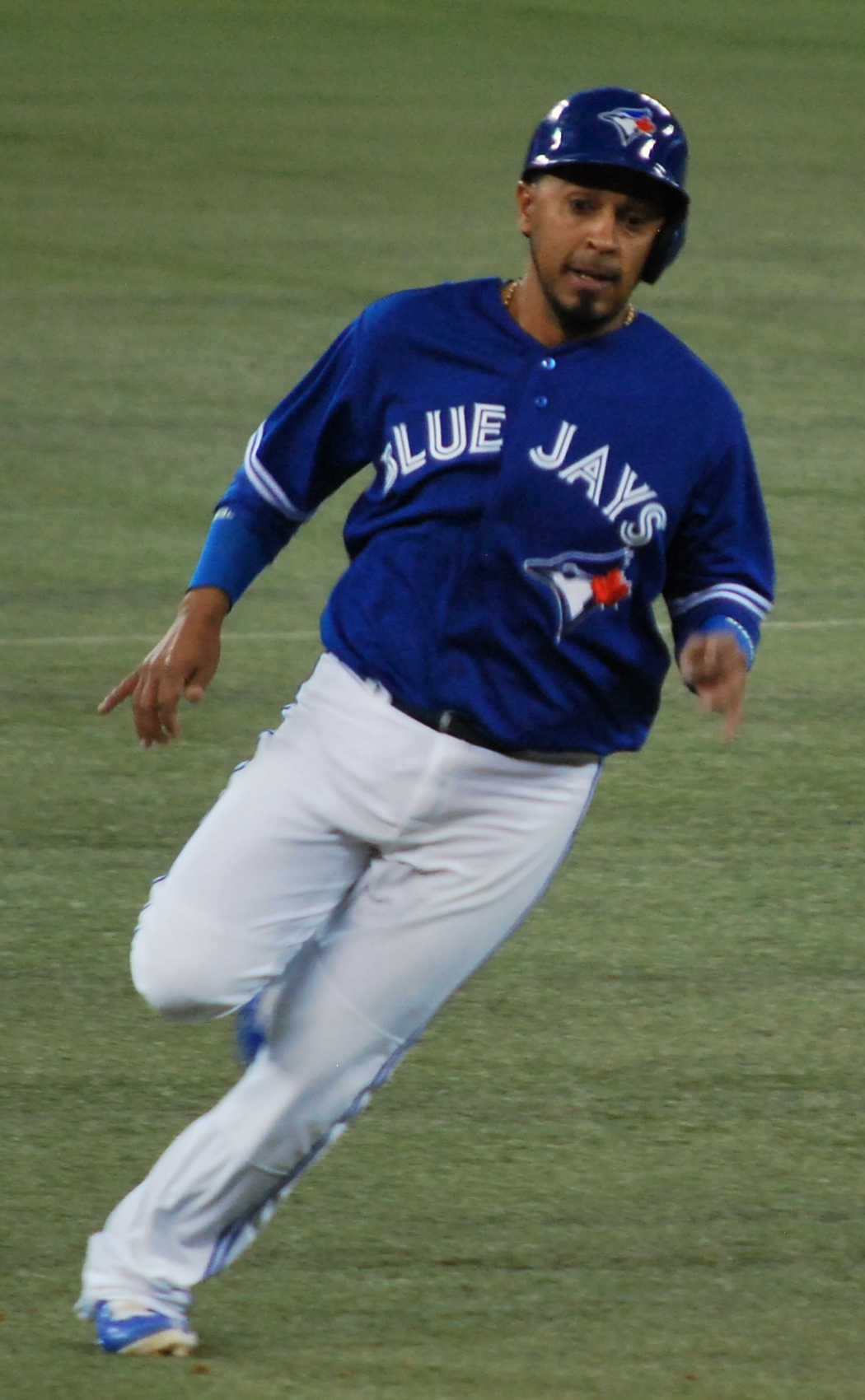
Izturis with the Toronto Blue Jays in 2013

On November 8, 2012, the Toronto Blue Jays announced that they had signed the free agent Izturis to a three-year $9 million deal with a $3 million club option for 2016. His option has a $1 million buyout.

On August 1, 2013, Izturis returned to Angel Stadium of Anaheim for the first time as a visitor, and was greeted with warm cheers from the Angel fans. He was placed on the 15-day disabled list on August 22 with a sprained left ankle. Ryan Goins was called up to replace Izturis. He was moved to the 60-day disabled list on August 24, effectively ending his first season as a Blue Jay. Izturis batted .236 in 2013 with 5 home runs and 32 RBI in 107 games.

On April 13, 2014, in the final game of a three-game series against the Baltimore Orioles, he had to be scratched from the lineup shortly before the start of the game after tripping on the dugout stairs. Izturis told the team he heard two loud pops when he tripped, and was taken for an MRI the following day. The MRI determined that he had torn his lateral collateral ligament in his left knee, and would require surgery. Izturis told reporters he would seek a second opinion before undergoing surgery, as the expected recovery time of 4–6 months would likely sideline him for the rest of the 2014 season. He was later put on the 60-day disabled list. In 11 games in 2014, Izturis batted .286 with 1 RBI.

Izturis suffered a groin strain near the end of 2015 spring training, and opened the 2015 season on the 15-day disabled list. On May 1, he was transferred to the 60-day disabled list. Izturis began a rehab assignment with the Dunedin Blue Jays in mid-May, but was shut down on May 23 after diving to make a play and injuring his shoulder. On May 30, it was announced that he had suffered a tear in his shoulder. Izturis underwent surgery to repair the tear in his shoulder in mid-June, and missed the remainder of the 2015 season. On November 3, Izturis's option for 2016 was declined by the Blue Jays, making him a free agent.

On January 29, 2016, Izturis signed a minor league contract with the Blue Jays that included an invitation to spring training. He would have earned $900,000 for the season if added to the 40-man roster, and incentives based on plate appearances could have totaled an additional $100,000. However, on March 4, 2016, Izturis announced his retirement from baseball, stating "I put my heart, my soul and my body into it this year to see how I was going to feel, but my body couldn't handle it anymore. So I decided this is the last time I'm going to be playing baseball.". His retirement left Bartolo Colón as the last active Montreal Expos player.

== Personal life ==
During his career Izturis spoke to the English-speaking press through an interpreter.

In his retirement, he runs an academy in Barquisimeto, Venezuela with his half brother César. His nephew César Jr. was a minor league prospect for the Seattle Mariners.

== See also ==
- List of Major League Baseball players from Venezuela
