= Juan Rivera (baseball) =

Venezuelan baseball player (born 1978)

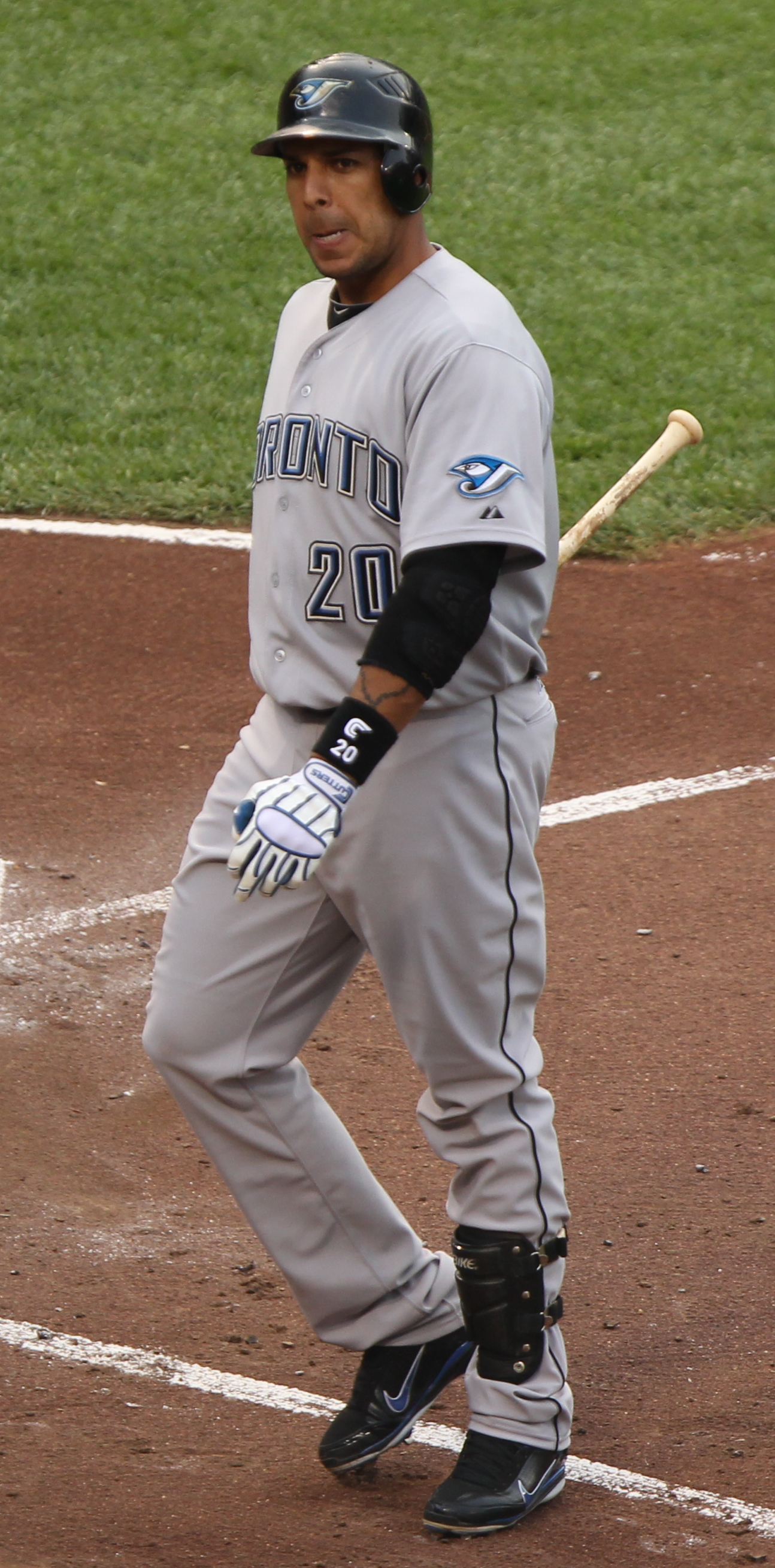
- Rivera with the Toronto Blue Jays in 2011
- Left fielder
- Born: July 3, 1978 (age 48); Guarenas, Miranda State, Venezuela
- Batted: Right Threw: Right

MLB debut
- September 4, 2001, for the New York Yankees

Last MLB appearance
- October 3, 2012, for the Los Angeles Dodgers

MLB statistics
- Batting average: .274
- Home runs: 132
- Runs batted in: 539
- Stats at Baseball Reference

Teams
- New York Yankees (2001–2003); Montreal Expos (2004); Los Angeles Angels of Anaheim (2005–2010); Toronto Blue Jays (2011); Los Angeles Dodgers (2011–2012)

Juan Luis Rivera (born July 3, 1978) is a Venezuelan former professional baseball outfielder. He played in Major League Baseball (MLB) for the New York Yankees, Montreal Expos, Los Angeles Angels of Anaheim, Toronto Blue Jays and Los Angeles Dodgers.

== Playing career ==
=== New York Yankees ===
Rivera was signed by the New York Yankees as a non-draft amateur free agent in 1996 and made his Major League debut on September 4, 2001, against the Toronto Blue Jays. He was hitless in four at-bats in three games that first season. He returned to the Yankees on June 5, 2002, and recorded his first hit, a double, against the Baltimore Orioles. He hit a .265 batting average with one home run in 2002, Nevertheless, it was enough to warrant Baseball America naming him the #1 prospect in the Yankees organization. His strengths were described as 'above-average raw power', 'crushes fastballs' and had excellent defense. However, in spite of good contact, an impatient hitter and an average runner who would likely get slower with age.

Rivera was again recalled in 2003, this time to hit seven homers (including a multi-homer game) with 26 RBI and a .266 batting average.

=== Montreal Expos ===
He, along with Nick Johnson and Randy Choate, was traded to the Montreal Expos before the 2004 season for Javier Vázquez. In 134 games with Montreal in 2004, he finished with a .307 batting average, 12 homers and 49 RBI.

=== Los Angeles Angels of Anaheim ===
On November 19, 2004, the Expos (on the verge of becoming the Washington Nationals) traded Rivera and shortstop Maicer Izturis to the Los Angeles Angels of Anaheim for outfielder José Guillén. In his first season as an Angel, Rivera saw playing time as both an outfielder and a designated hitter. Although he started the season slowly, he stepped up his play in the final months of 2005 and finished with a .271 batting average and a then-career high 15 home runs and 59 RBIs in 106 games.

During the 2006 campaign, Rivera was made an everyday player, either starting at left field or serving as the designated hitter when veteran Garret Anderson played left. He finished the season with his best statistical year yet, batting .310 with 23 home runs and 85 RBI.

Juan Rivera was the starting left fielder for the Venezuelan team in the inaugural World Baseball Classic.

While playing for Oriente in Venezuela's winter ball, Rivera broke his leg sliding for first and was placed on the disabled list by the Angels. This injury kept him out for most of the 2007 season, with the exception of a brief appearance for 14 games in September.

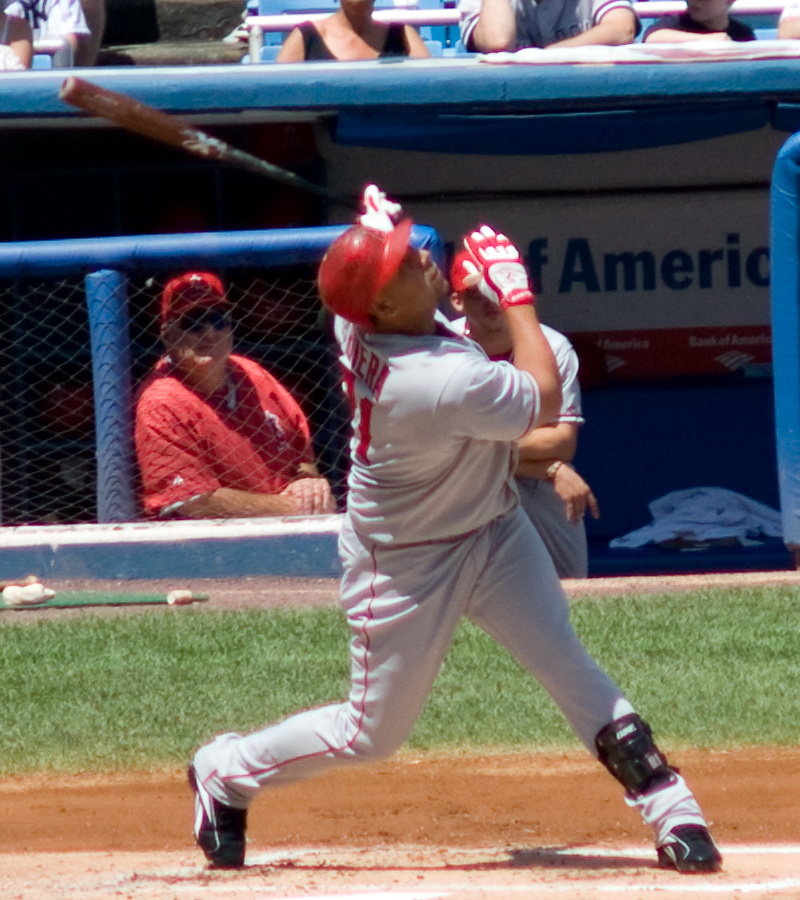
Rivera batting for the Los Angeles Angels in 2008

On December 19, 2008, Juan Rivera re-signed with the Angels for three years worth $12.75 million through 2011.

Rivera had a good hitting season, especially in the months of May to July. He hit 25 home runs, batted for an average of .287, and had an on-base plus slugging of .810. However, in contrast to the rest of the team, his baserunning was generally poor. Noted baseball analyst Bill James rated him the worst baserunner in the MLB in his annual book, because of his overaggressive tactics including being thrown out 8 times on attempts at going from first to third, costing his team an estimated 40 runs.

Rivera got 2010 off to a slow start, batting just .235 over the first two months of the season. He finished the season hitting .243 with 15 home runs.

=== Toronto Blue Jays ===
After the 2010 season, Rivera was traded to the Toronto Blue Jays along with catcher Mike Napoli in exchange for outfielder Vernon Wells.

On July 3, Rivera was designated for assignment by the Blue Jays after hitting .243 with 6 home runs in 70 games for them during the first half of the 2011 season.

=== Los Angeles Dodgers ===
On July 12, 2011, Rivera was traded to the Los Angeles Dodgers for a player to be named later or cash considerations. On July 15, 2011, in his first at bat as a Dodger, he hit a home run on the first pitch he saw off Joe Saunders of the Arizona Diamondbacks. He went on to play in 62 games for the Dodgers, hitting .274 with 5 home runs and 46 RBI. After the season, he signed a new one-year contract with the Dodgers which included an option for 2013.

He spent most of the 2012 season platooning in left field (with Tony Gwynn Jr. and Bobby Abreu) and at first base (with James Loney). After the Dodgers acquired Shane Victorino and Adrián González in trades, Rivera was relegated to pinch hitting. In 109 games, he hit .244 with 9 home runs and 47 RBI. The Dodgers declined his 2013 option worth $4 million on October 29, instead electing to pay the $400,000 buyout, making him a free agent.

=== New York Yankees ===
On January 28, 2013, the New York Yankees signed Juan Rivera to a minor-league deal. On March 28, he was released by the Yankees.

=== Arizona Diamondbacks ===
On April 30, 2013, Rivera signed a minor league deal with the Diamondbacks, and played 2013 with the Reno Aces.

=== 2015 WBSC Premier12 ===
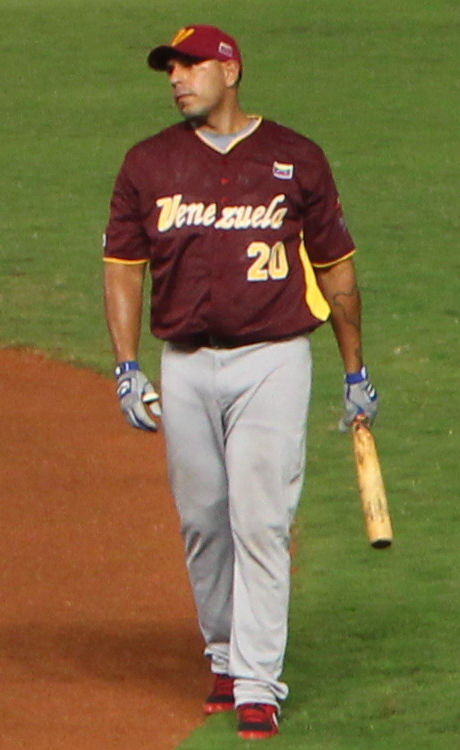
Rivera with the Venezuela national team in 2015 WBSC Premier12 warm-up game

In November 2015, Rivera participated with the Venezuela national team in the inaugural WBSC Premier12.

== Batting style ==
Rivera is distinguished by his high contact rate and low strikeout rate. In 2009, he had the ninth lowest strikeout percentage in the American League, at 10.8%. His career strikeout rate stands at 11.3% through the 2009 season, compared to an MLB average of 18.0%.

== See also ==
- List of Major League Baseball players from Venezuela
