= Casey Kotchman =

American baseball player (born 1983)

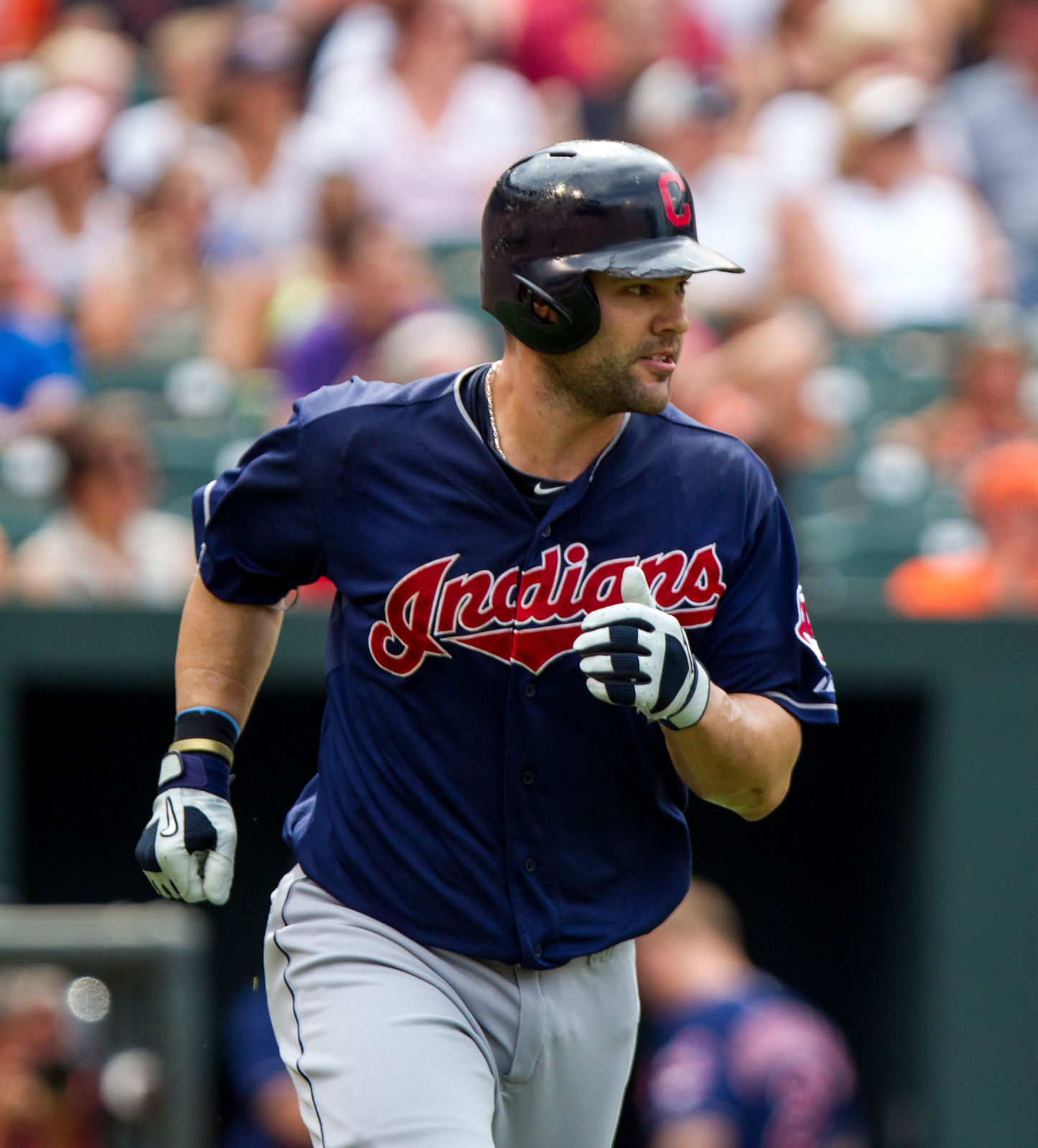
- Kotchman with the Cleveland Indians
- First baseman
- Born: February 22, 1983 (age 43); St. Petersburg, Florida, U.S.
- Batted: Left Threw: Left

MLB debut
- May 9, 2004, for the Anaheim Angels

Last MLB appearance
- June 18, 2013, for the Miami Marlins

MLB statistics
- Batting average: .260
- Home runs: 71
- Runs batted in: 388
- Stats at Baseball Reference

Teams
- Anaheim Angels / Los Angeles Angels of Anaheim (2004–2008); Atlanta Braves (2008–2009); Boston Red Sox (2009); Seattle Mariners (2010); Tampa Bay Rays (2011); Cleveland Indians (2012); Miami Marlins (2013)
Medals
Men's baseball
Representing United States
Pan American Games
Silver medal – second place	2015 Toronto	Team
World Youth Baseball Championship
Gold medal – first place	1998 Fairview Heights	Team

Casey John Kotchman (born February 22, 1983) is an American former professional baseball first baseman. He played in Major League Baseball (MLB) for the Anaheim Angels / Los Angeles Angels of Anaheim, Atlanta Braves, Boston Red Sox, Seattle Mariners, Tampa Bay Rays, Cleveland Indians, and Miami Marlins. Kotchman holds the major league record for consecutive error-less games at first base, with 274, set between June 2008 and August 2010.

== High school ==
Kotchman played baseball for Seminole High School in Seminole, Florida. In 2001, Baseball America ranked the team number one nationally, with Kotchman the top-ranked player nationally—the team went undefeated on the field in 31 games (with an official record of 21–10 due to forfeits) and won the state Class 5A championship.

== Professional career ==
=== Anaheim Angels / Los Angeles Angels of Anaheim ===
The Anaheim Angels selected Kotchman with the thirteenth overall pick in the 2001 MLB draft.

In 2006, the Angels moved 2005 starter Darin Erstad back to center field, announcing that Kotchman would likely open the season at first base. After struggling in his at-bats early in 2006 because of mononucleosis, Kotchman was placed on the disabled list in early May. In 2007, Kotchman proclaimed himself fully healthy and proved it by winning the Angels' opening day first baseman job for the second straight year.

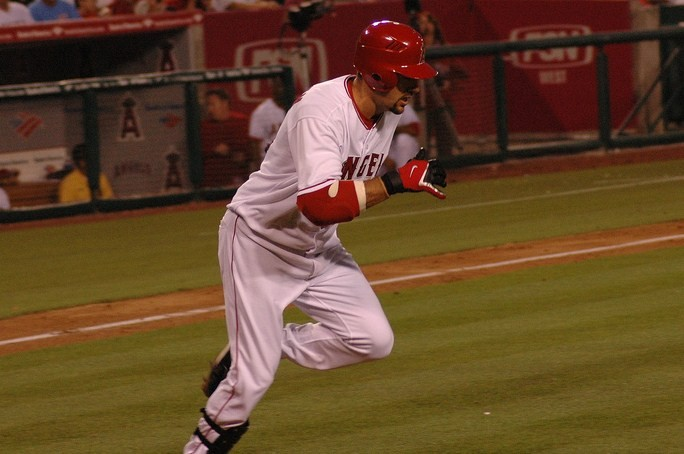
Casey Kotchman during his tenure with the Los Angeles Angels of Anaheim.

Kotchman missed 128 games in 2006, as he was kept away from the field with complications stemming from mononucleosis. After a spring in which the Opening Day starting first baseman batted better than .400, he hit just .152 with one home run and six RBI in 29 games with the Angels. Kotchman tried to return to the field, but his rehab assignment was cut short when he experienced dizzy spells in July while playing for Triple-A Salt Lake. He spent much of the rest of the season at home in Florida, performing cardio exercises.

In 2007, he was one of seven Angels regulars to hit over .290 (most in majors) and established career highs in several offensive categories including batting average (.296), home runs (11) and RBI (68). He also hit .320 at Angel Stadium and .274 on the road. He had a 7-game hit streak (7-8/31-8/7), his 4th seven-game streak of season (each matching a career-high). He left the June 16 game against the Los Angeles Dodgers in the 7th after being hit on the helmet by a pickoff throw at second base by Dodgers catcher Russell Martin and was diagnosed with a mild concussion and received three stitches behind his right ear. On June 25, he returned to the starting lineup after missing seven games. He logged the first three triples of his career. He connected for his second career grand slam in the first inning on May 14 against the Texas Rangers. He had a .997 fielding percentage and was ranked fourth among AL first basemen (3 E/1049 TC) in the 2007 season. He hit a solo home run on Opening Night against the Texas Rangers in his first at-bat of the season, his first home run since May 4, 2006, against the Detroit Tigers. He connected for the game-winning RBI single in the 9th inning on July 13 against the Rangers. He collected a career-best four hits in 1 game on August 17 against the Boston Red Sox.

=== Atlanta Braves ===
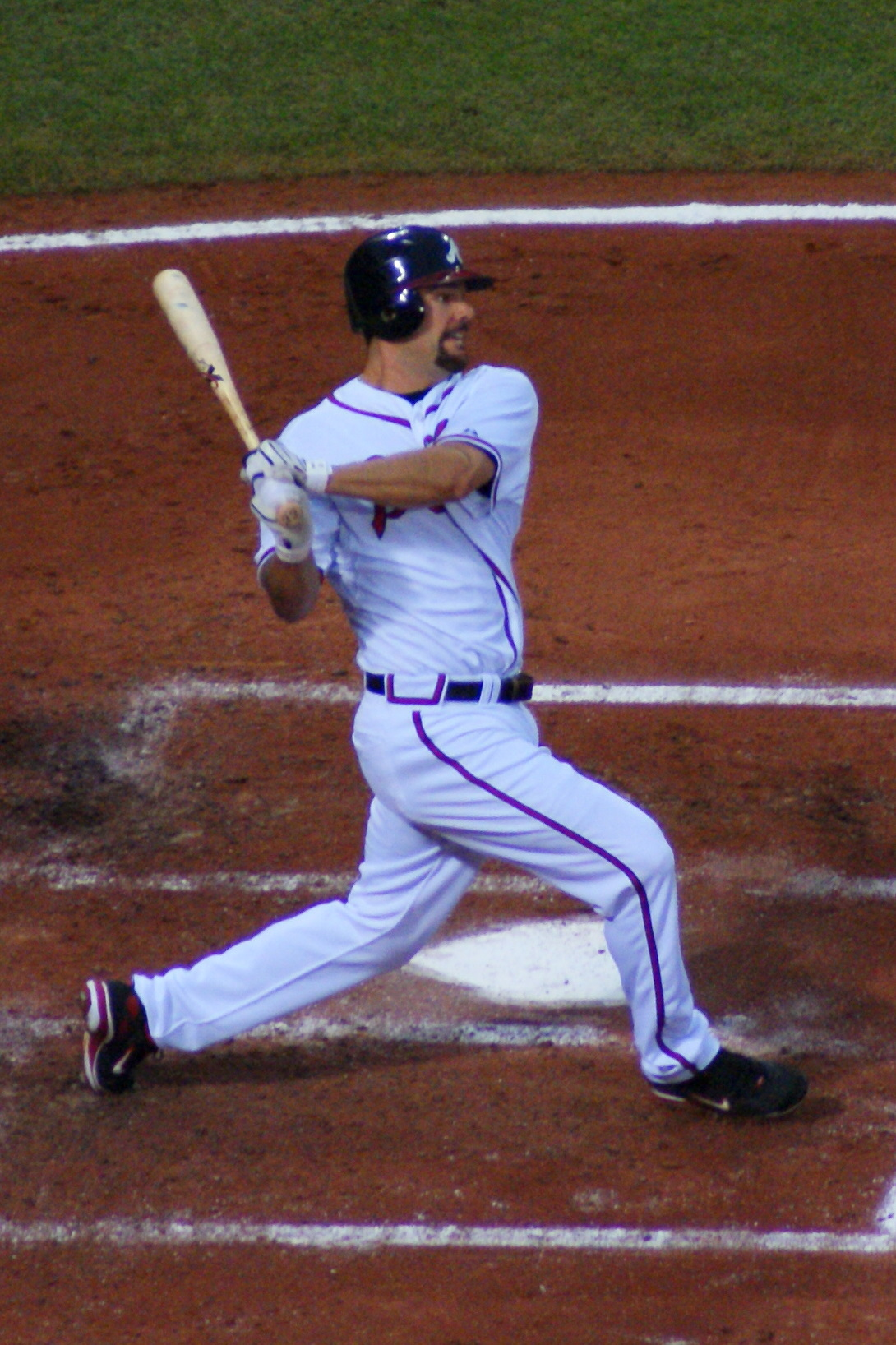
Kotchman with the Braves.

On July 29, 2008, Kotchman was traded to the Atlanta Braves along with minor league pitcher Stephen Marek for first baseman Mark Teixeira. Kotchman started his tenure with the Braves by batting just .157 in his first 20 games but he ended the season with a .237 batting average.

Kotchman was placed on the bereavement list after his mother fell ill on August 20, 2008. After seven days, the Braves placed Kotchman on the restricted list so he could continue to be with his mother in Florida. Eleven days from first being placed on the bereavement list, the Braves activated Kotchman.

On January 31, 2009, Kotchman avoided arbitration and agreed to a one-year, $2.885 million contract. Kotchman mentioned at spring training in 2009 that playing for the Braves was always a dream of his. Kotchman suffered a shin contusion after being hit by a pitch from Arizona Diamondbacks' pitcher Max Scherzer on May 31 and was expected to be out two to three days. The injury did, however, force Kotchman on the 15-day disabled list and was activated on June 16.

=== Boston Red Sox ===
On July 31, 2009, Atlanta traded Kotchman to the Boston Red Sox for first baseman Adam LaRoche. In Kotchman's first game with the Red Sox, he hit a two-run home run off of Joba Chamberlain. With the Red Sox, Kotchman hit .218 with three doubles, one home run, seven RBIs, and one stolen base in 29 games. This gave Kotchman a combined average of .268 with 23 doubles, seven home runs, 48 RBIs, and 39 walks in 126 games between Boston and Atlanta.

=== Seattle Mariners ===
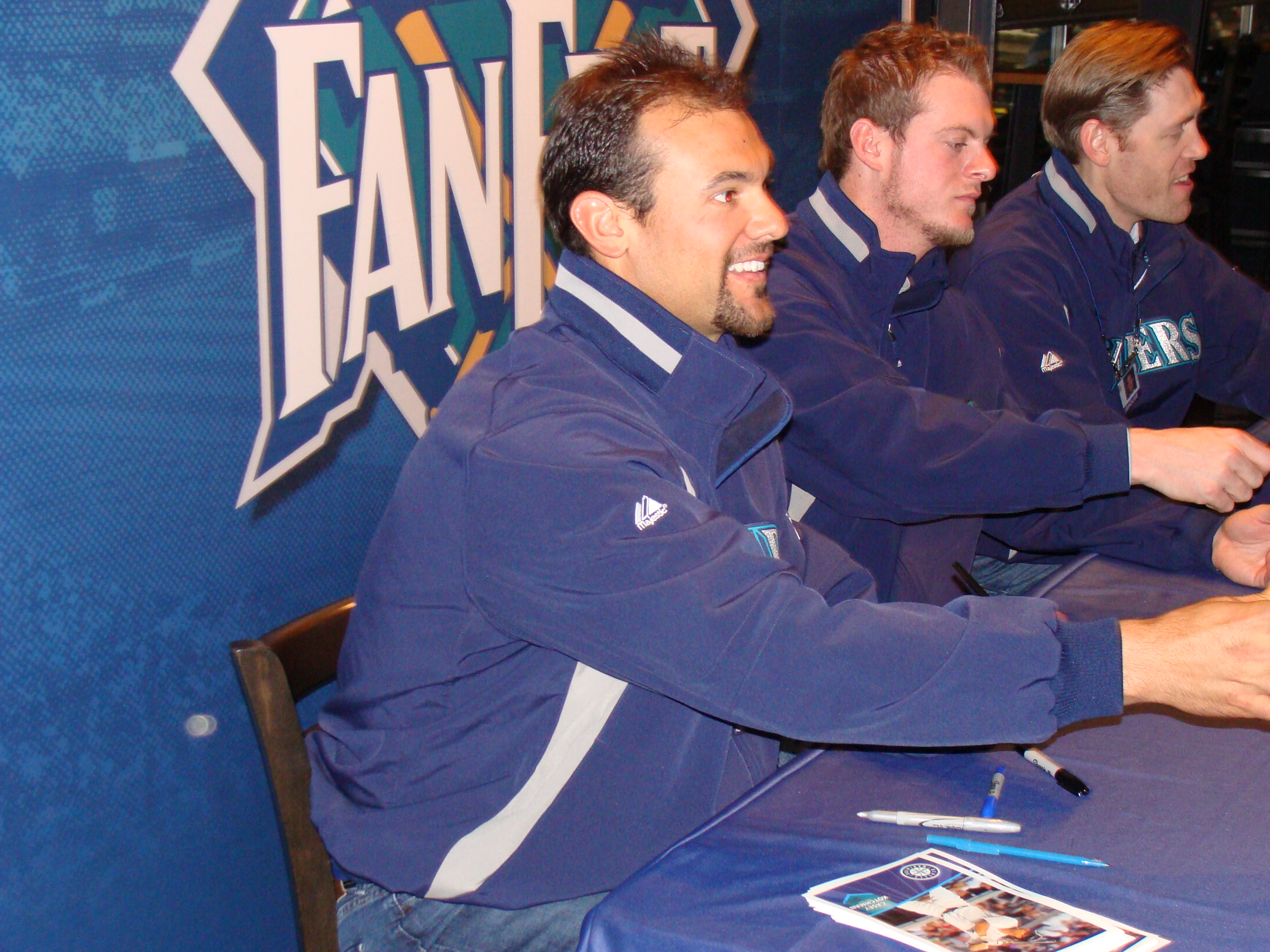
Kotchman (left) at Seattle Mariners FanFest 2010.

On January 5, 2010 the Red Sox traded Kotchman to the Seattle Mariners in exchange for utility player Bill Hall, a minor league player, and cash. On February 3, Kotchman and the Mariners agreed on a new contract, avoiding salary arbitration. On June 3, Kotchman set the Major League Baseball individual streak record with 2,003 consecutive chances without an error. The previous record had been held by Kevin Youkilis of the Boston Red Sox, established between July 4, 2006, and June 6, 2008. On August 21, the streak ended when Kotchman mishandled a hard groundball hit by Curtis Granderson of the New York Yankees. The error was his first since July 20, 2008, when he played for the Los Angeles Angels of Anaheim, a streak of 2,379 fielding chances. He batted .217 for the season. On November 4, Kotchman refused an outright assignment to the Triple-A Tacoma Rainiers, electing to become a free agent instead.

=== Tampa Bay Rays ===
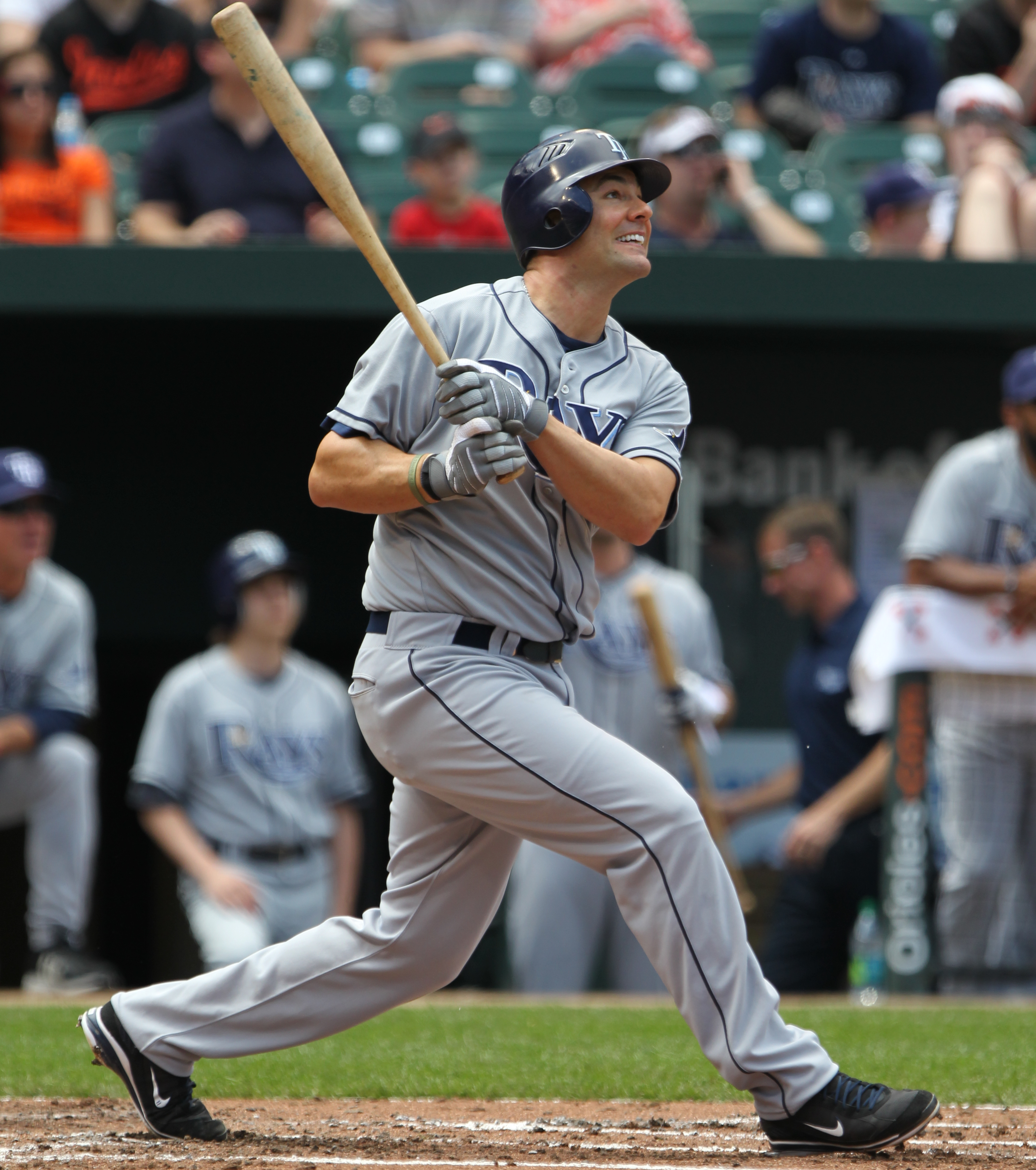
Kotchman batting for the Rays.

Kotchman signed a minor league contract with an invitation to 2011 spring training with the Tampa Bay Rays. On March 26, the Rays assigned Kotchman to Triple-A Durham. Following the retirement of Manny Ramirez six games into the 2011 season, the Rays called up Kotchman. On August 9, Kotchman hit a walk-off home run off Kansas City Royals reliever Blake Wood to give the Rays a 2–1 win.

=== Cleveland Indians ===
Kotchman signed a one-year contract with the Cleveland Indians on February 3, 2012. Kotchman made 142 appearances for Cleveland during the regular season, batting .229/.280/.333 with 12 home runs and 55 RBI.

=== Miami Marlins ===
On February 15, 2013, Kotchman signed a minor league contract with the Miami Marlins organization. On March 31, the Marlins selected Kotchman's contract after he made the team's Opening Day roster. He was quickly placed on the disabled list due to a left hamstring strain and was not activated until June 3. In six appearances for Miami, Kotchman went 0-for-20 with one RBI and one walk. He played his final MLB game on June 8, playing the final 10 innings of a 20-inning win over the New York Mets. After returning to the disabled list as the result of a left oblique strain, he was released on August 26.

Kotchman's .9975 career fielding percentage is the best among major league first basemen, slightly ahead of Kevin Youkilis, as of the end of the 2025 season.

=== Kansas City Royals ===
After sitting all of the 2014 season retired from baseball, Kotchman signed a minor league contract with the Kansas City Royals on March 6, 2015. He played in 90 games for the Triple-A Omaha Storm Chasers, hitting .290/.374/.426 with seven home runs and 44 RBI. Kotchman elected free agency following the season on November 6.

=== Toronto Blue Jays ===
On November 23, 2015, Kotchman signed a minor league contract with the Toronto Blue Jays that included an invitation to spring training. In 102 games for the Triple-A Buffalo Bisons, he batted .256/.343/.383 with eight home runs and 34 RBI. Kotchman elected free agency following the season on November 7.

== Personal life ==
Kotchman's father is Tom Kotchman, a long-time Angels' minor league manager and scout. Kotchman's mother works as a principal and was formerly a teacher. She suffered a brain hemorrhage during the 2008 season; as a result Kotchman had to be placed on the Major League bereavement list and later the restricted list. She recovered, however. His sister Christal played softball for the College of Charleston Cougars.
