= José Arredondo =

Dominican baseball player (born 1984)

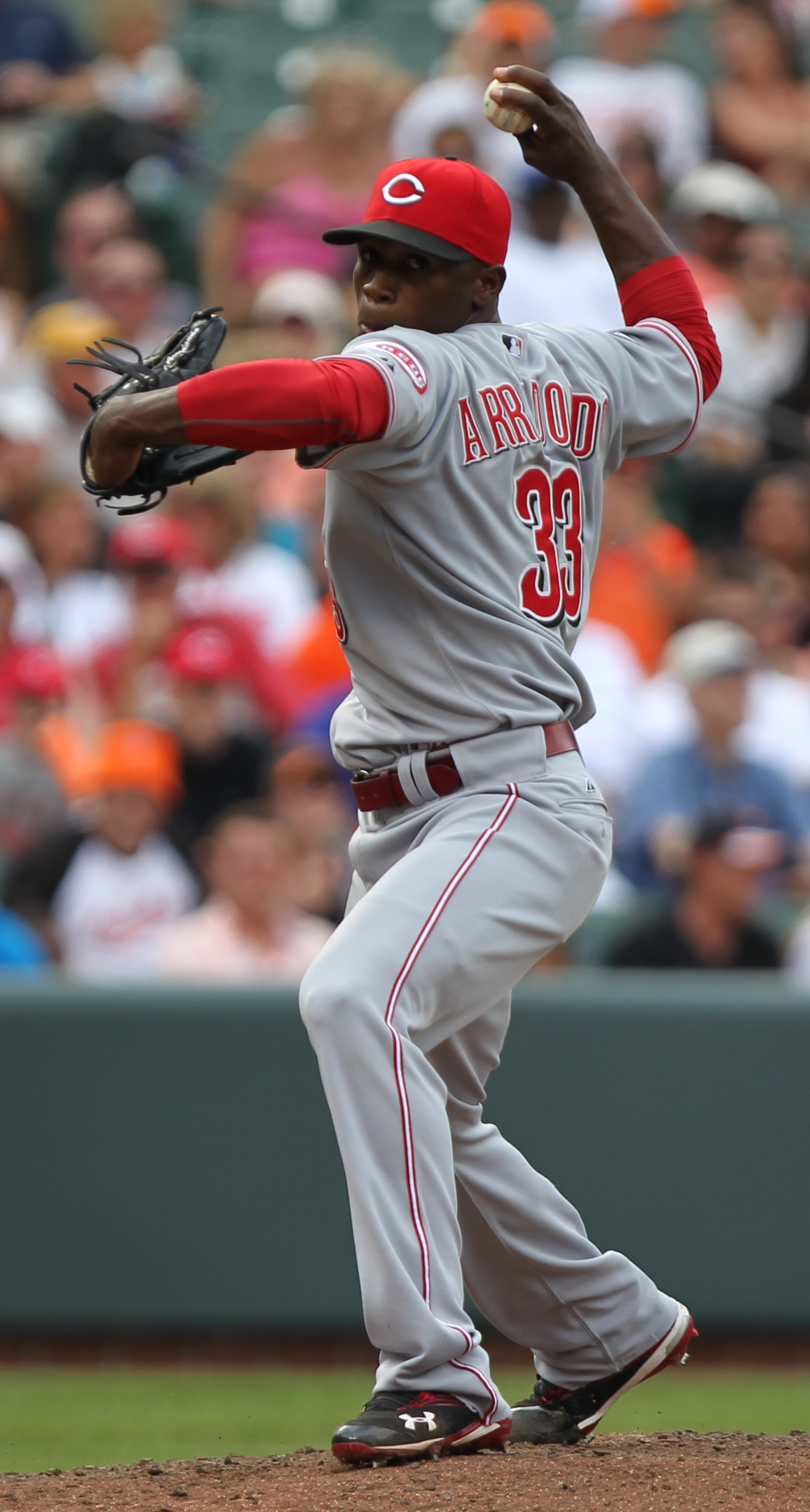
- Arredondo pitching in relief for the Cincinnati Reds at Baltimore, June 2011
- Relief pitcher
- Born: March 12, 1984 (age 42); San Pedro de Macorís, Dominican Republic
- Batted: Right Threw: Right

MLB debut
- May 14, 2008, for the Los Angeles Angels

Last MLB appearance
- October 3, 2012, for the Cincinnati Reds

MLB statistics
- Win–loss record: 22-11
- Earned run average: 3.27
- Strikeouts: 212
- Stats at Baseball Reference

Teams
- Los Angeles Angels of Anaheim (2008–2009); Cincinnati Reds (2011–2012)

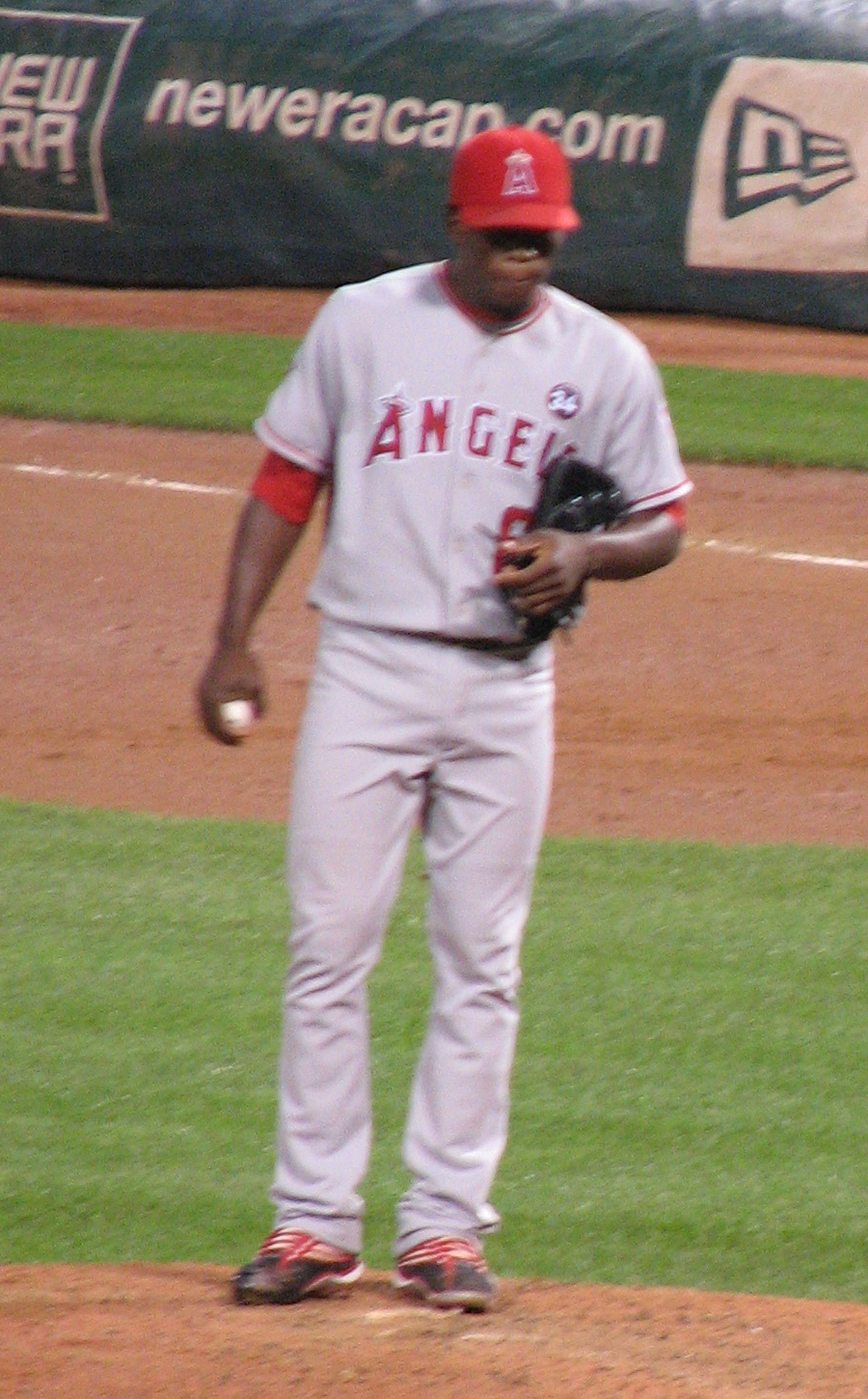
Arredondo pitching in relief in an away game for the Los Angeles Angels at Boston, September 2009

José Juan Arredondo (born March 12, 1984) is a Dominican former professional baseball relief pitcher. He played in Major League Baseball (MLB) for the Los Angeles Angels of Anaheim and Cincinnati Reds.

== Playing career ==
=== Los Angeles Angels of Anaheim ===
Arredondo was signed as a non-drafted free agent by the Angels on June 25, 2002.

==== 2008 season ====
Arredondo made his MLB debut against the Chicago White Sox on May 14, 2008, at Angel Stadium in Anaheim, California. He surrendered a home run to Nick Swisher, the first batter he ever faced.

Arredondo earned his first career MLB victory on May 26, 2008, against the Detroit Tigers in Anaheim, throwing two perfect innings of relief in an Angels' 1–0 12-inning victory. On June 28, he pitched in relief of Jered Weaver and combined with Weaver to not allow a hit against the Los Angeles Dodgers, but still lost the game 1–0. That was only the fourth time an eight-inning no-hitter had ever been lost due to the home team winning the game, and the first as a combined no-hitter. Because the Angels did not pitch nine innings, it is not officially considered a no-hitter.

Arredondo finished the season with a 10–2 record and a 1.62 ERA. He was considered to be a potential closer until the Angels signed Brian Fuentes.

==== 2009 season ====
Although Arredondo was coming off of a stellar 2008 rookie season, he struggled in spring training with diminished velocity and poor control. After a rough start to the 2009 season, he was optioned to the Angels' Triple-A affiliate, the Salt Lake Bees, on June 10. Soon afterwards, an MRI revealed a sprained ligament in his elbow.

After a few sporadic appearances in July and August for the Angels, the Angels management asked Arredondo to train at the team's camp in Arizona (Tempe, Arizona) in case he was needed for the playoffs. "Arredondo chose not to, heading home to the Dominican Republic instead", Orange County Register's Bill Plunkett reported: "It was a decision (Tony) Reagins (the Angels' manager) admitted 'surprised' if not disappointed the organization." His history of elbow injury and behavior problems, "seriously dented his standing with the Angels", wrote Plunkett, "and calls into question his future with the organization."

On December 10, 2009, the Angels announced that Arredondo would have Tommy John elbow reconstruction and would miss the entire 2010 season. Just two days later, on December 12, the Angels announced that they would not offer Arredondo a contract for 2010.

=== Cincinnati Reds ===
==== 2010 ====
On January 22, 2010, Arredondo signed a minor league contract with the Cincinnati Reds. He underwent Tommy John surgery (UCL or ulnar collateral ligament reconstruction) in February and spent the summer of 2010 training at the Reds' facility in Goodyear, Arizona. On July 23, 2010, the Reds purchased the contract of Arredondo and placed him on the 60-day DL after designating Corky Miller for assignment.

==== 2011 ====
Arredondo was with the Reds during spring training, but was placed on the 15-day DL to start the season so he could fully recover from Tommy John surgery. He began his rehab assignment on April 11, and was activated from the DL on May 14. Mike Leake was optioned for the first time in his career to free up the spot for Arredondo. Arredondo posted a 3.04 ERA through his first 24 games, despite having control problems early on and walking 22 batters in his first 24 games. After pitching on July 6 against the Cardinals, he had forearm pain in his right arm. He was unavailable in the final series before the All-Star break, and on July 15 he was placed on the disabled list, retroactive to July 7. The Reds recalled lefty Jeremy Horst. On July 29, in his first career major league at bat after pitching a perfect 13th against the San Francisco Giants, Arredondo singled to set up Édgar Rentería's game-ending hit. In 53 appearances for the Reds, Arredondo compiled a 4-4 record and 3.23 ERA with 48 strikeouts over 53 innings of work.

==== 2012–2013 ====
Arredondo made 66 appearances for the Reds during the 2012 season, posting a 6-2 record and 2.95 ERA with 62 strikeouts over 61 innings of work. On March 31, 2013, he was removed from the 40-man roster and sent outright to the Triple-A Louisville Bats.

=== York Revolution ===
Arredondo signed with the York Revolution of the Atlantic League of Professional Baseball on March 18, 2016. In 35 appearances for the Revolution, he compiled a 1-2 record and 2.25 ERA with 38 strikeouts over 36 innings of work. He re-signed with York on March 1, 2017. In 6 outings for the Revolution, he struggled to an 0-1 record and 13.50 ERA with 3 strikeouts across 4 innings pitched. Arredondo was released by York on July 16.

== Pitching style ==
Arrendondo had four pitches, the primary one being a splitter averaging about 85 mph. He also threw a four-seam fastball (90–92), a two-seam fastball (89-91), and a slider to right-handers (82–85). With 2 strikes, he threw splitters the great majority of the time.
