= Chone Figgins =

American baseball player (born 1978)

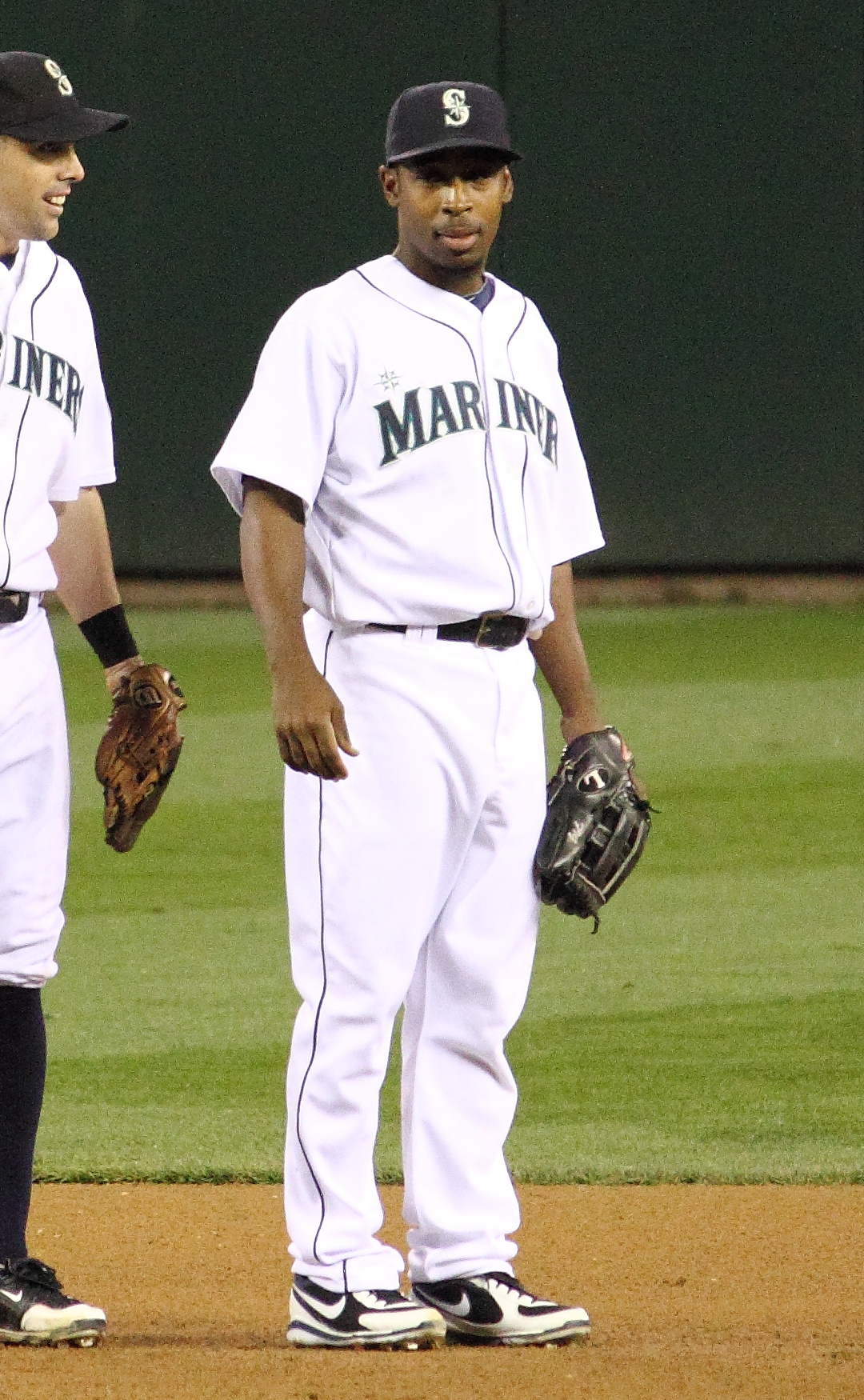
- Figgins with the Seattle Mariners
- Third baseman / Outfielder / Second baseman
- Born: January 22, 1978 (age 48); Leary, Georgia, U.S.
- Batted: Switch Threw: Right

MLB debut
- August 25, 2002, for the Anaheim Angels

Last MLB appearance
- June 13, 2014, for the Los Angeles Dodgers

MLB statistics
- Batting average: .276
- Home runs: 35
- Runs batted in: 403
- Stolen bases: 341
- Stats at Baseball Reference

Teams
- Anaheim Angels / Los Angeles Angels of Anaheim (2002–2009); Seattle Mariners (2010–2012); Los Angeles Dodgers (2014)

Career highlights and awards
- All-Star (2009); World Series champion (2002); MLB stolen base leader (2005)

Desmond DeChone Figgins (/ˈʃɒn/; SHAWN; born January 22, 1978), nicknamed "Figgy", is an American former professional baseball utilty player. He played in Major League Baseball (MLB) for the Los Angeles Angels of Anaheim, Seattle Mariners, and Los Angeles Dodgers.

Figgins debuted with the Angels in 2002, winning the World Series that fall while serving exclusively as a pinch runner. He led the American League in stolen bases in 2005 and was an All-Star in 2009, also leading the American League in walks. That winter, he signed a four-year contract with the Mariners. However, Seattle released him after three years. He briefly returned to the majors with the Dodgers in 2014.

Figgins played primarily third base during his best seasons with the Angels, but played all positions except catcher, pitcher, and first base. He played regularly in center field early in his MLB career and was primarily a second baseman with Seattle.

== Early life ==
Figgins was born in Leary, Georgia to Charles Figgins and Eva Callins, who had been born on the same day and lived next door to each other in Leary. When Figgins was a year old, his father moved the family to Brandon, Florida. Both of his parents played competitive slow-pitch softball and were avid baseball fans. He attended Brandon High School where he played only shortstop.

== Professional career ==
=== Colorado Rockies ===
The Colorado Rockies drafted Figgins in the fourth round of the 1997 Major League Baseball draft and moved him to second base because the team had greater expectations for Juan Uribe at shortstop. In July 2001, he was traded to the Anaheim Angels for outfielder Kimera Bartee.

=== Anaheim Angels/Los Angeles Angels of Anaheim ===
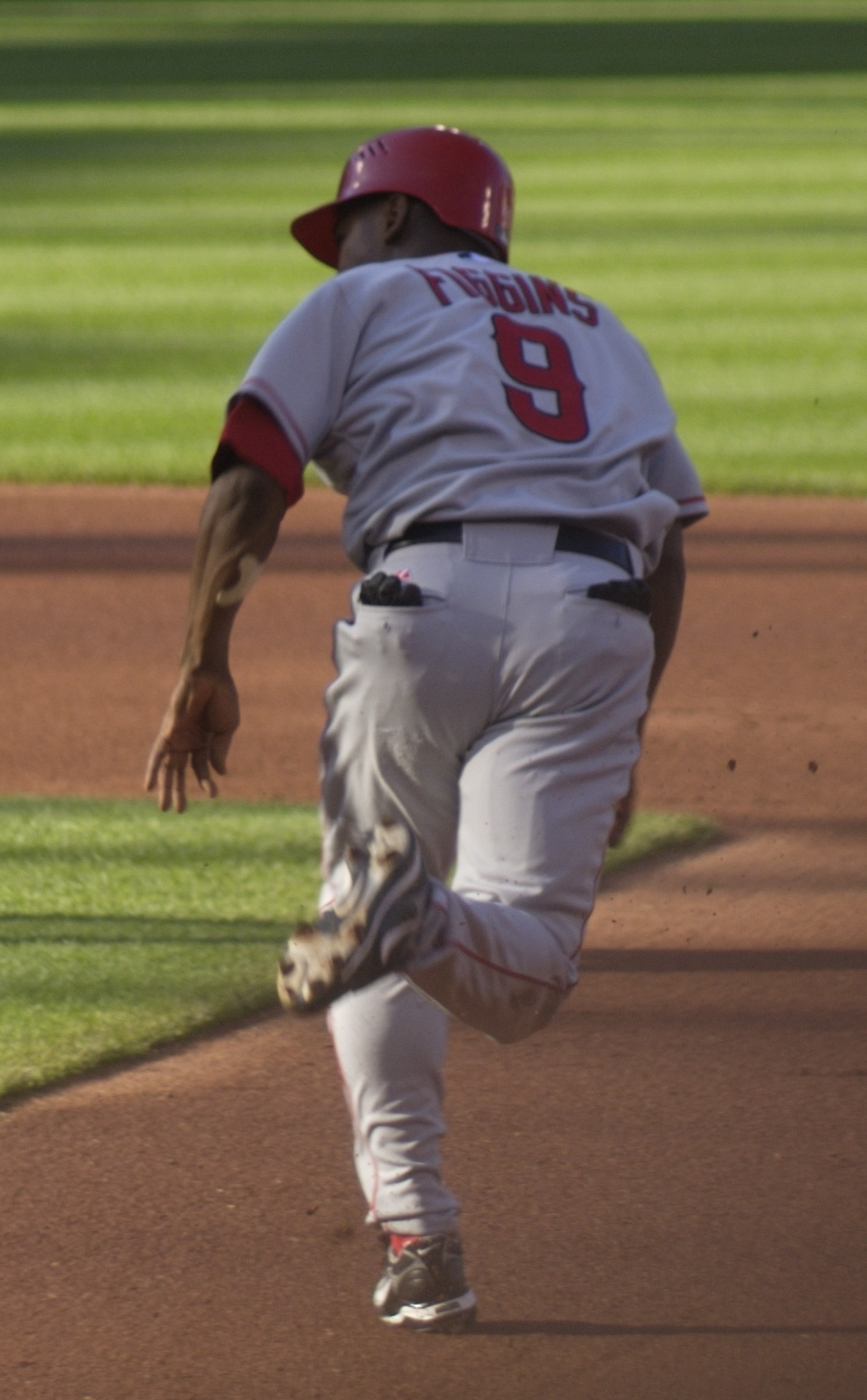
Figgins stealing a base for the Anaheim Angels in 2007

Figgins made his major league debut as a pinch runner on August 25, 2002, against the Boston Red Sox. His first hit was an RBI single to right field off Aaron Myette of the Texas Rangers on September 15, 2002. He was exclusively a pinch runner in the postseason, appearing in 6 games as the Angels won the World Series. He scored four times, stole one base, and was 1-for-1 in his only at bat. His first full season in the majors was 2004. On May 14, 2004, he went 5-for-6 in a 10 inning game against the Baltimore Orioles and hit his first home run off Kurt Ainsworth of the Orioles. His breakout year came in 2005, when he was moved to leadoff hitter after original leadoff hitter David Eckstein signed with the St. Louis Cardinals. He used his speed to steal an American League-high 62 bases, the second-most in Angels history. That year, he played two positions in the same game 24 times. He was named team co-MVP of the 2005 season for the Angels, along with Bartolo Colón.

Prior to the 2006 season, the Angels signed Figgins to a three-year, $10.5-million deal. He had been eligible for salary arbitration. Figgins became the fifth Angel to hit for the cycle on September 16, 2006, at the Ballpark in Arlington. Against the Oakland Athletics on September 29, 2006, he hit his first career inside-the-park home run at Angel Stadium. Along with third base, Figgins also played shortstop, second base, and all three outfield positions. Although he was initially considered for the center field job in 2006, the Angels decided to move Darin Erstad back to the position. Figgins became the starter at third base. With Erstad on the disabled list for much of the season, however, Figgins saw more time in center field.

On March 21, 2007, in a spring training game against the Arizona Diamondbacks, Figgins suffered two broken fingers on his throwing hand while attempting to field a ground ball hit by Conor Jackson. He began the season on the disabled list and did not return till the end of April. In June 2007, Figgins recorded an Angels team-record 53 hits in a month, breaking the record set by Darin Erstad in April 2000. With six hits on June 18, 2007, against the Houston Astros, including a walk-off triple, Figgins matched the American League (AL) record for most hits in a nine-inning game. On July 15, 2007, Figgins stole his 187th base as an Angel, breaking the 20-year-old club record previously held by Gary Pettis, who was in attendance that day as a coach for the visiting Texas Rangers.

In 2009, Figgins was selected to his only All-Star Game. He finished the season with an AL-best 101 walks and finished 10th in AL MVP voting. Although Figgins stole 42 bases, he was caught 17 times – tied for the most in the majors.

=== Seattle Mariners ===
On December 4, 2009, it was reported that Figgins and the Seattle Mariners agreed to a four-year contract worth approximately $36 million. During spring training for the 2010 season, Figgins was converted to second base, moving teammate José López to third. Figgins had his worst year to date in 2010, batting just .259, though he did match his previous season stolen base total of 42. Following the season, Figgins converted back to third base, due to the departure of Lopez. Halfway through the 2011 season, he was replaced by Adam Kennedy as the everyday third baseman. In only 81 games, with only 288 at bats, Figgins finished the season batting only .188.

To begin the 2012 season, Figgins was allowed the opportunity to bat leadoff for the Mariners in the hopes that the return to the spot in the lineup where he thrived during his time with the Angels would jump start his bat. On May 4, manager Eric Wedge announced that Figgins would no longer be an everyday player. He ended the 2012 season batting .181 with 166 at bats in 66 games and was designated for assignment by the Mariners on November 20, 2012.

=== Miami Marlins ===
On February 8, 2013, Figgins signed a minor league contract with the Miami Marlins. However, he did not make the team out of spring training and was released on March 20.

=== Los Angeles Dodgers ===
After sitting out the 2013 season, Figgins signed a minor league contract with the Los Angeles Dodgers for 2014. The Dodgers purchased his contract on March 16 and added him to the major league roster. In 38 games with the Dodgers, he appeared as a utility player/pinch hitter and hit .217, though he had a .373 OBP due to drawing 14 walks in 76 plate appearances. He was placed on the disabled list in mid-June with a hip injury and then spent an extended time with the Triple-A Albuquerque Isotopes on a rehab assignment. Figgins was designated for assignment by Los Angeles on August 6. The Dodgers asked for unconditional release waivers on August 13. Figgins was not signed by another team.

=== Retirement ===
On March 20, 2016, Figgins announced his retirement from professional baseball. He signed a one-day contract with the Angels in order to retire with the team.

Figgins was on the 2020 Baseball Hall of Fame ballot, receiving no votes.

== Personal life ==
Figgins said in 2005 that his closest friend in baseball was Juan Pierre.

Figgins' brother, Demetrius, worked as a scout for the Angels.

Figgins is married, and their son was born in 2015.

== See also ==
- List of Major League Baseball players to hit for the cycle
- List of Major League Baseball single-game hits leaders
- List of Major League Baseball career stolen bases leaders
- List of Major League Baseball annual stolen base leaders

Achievements
Preceded by Gary Matthews Jr.	Hitting for the cycle September 16, 2006	Succeeded by Fred Lewis
