= Gary Matthews Jr. =

American baseball player (born 1974)

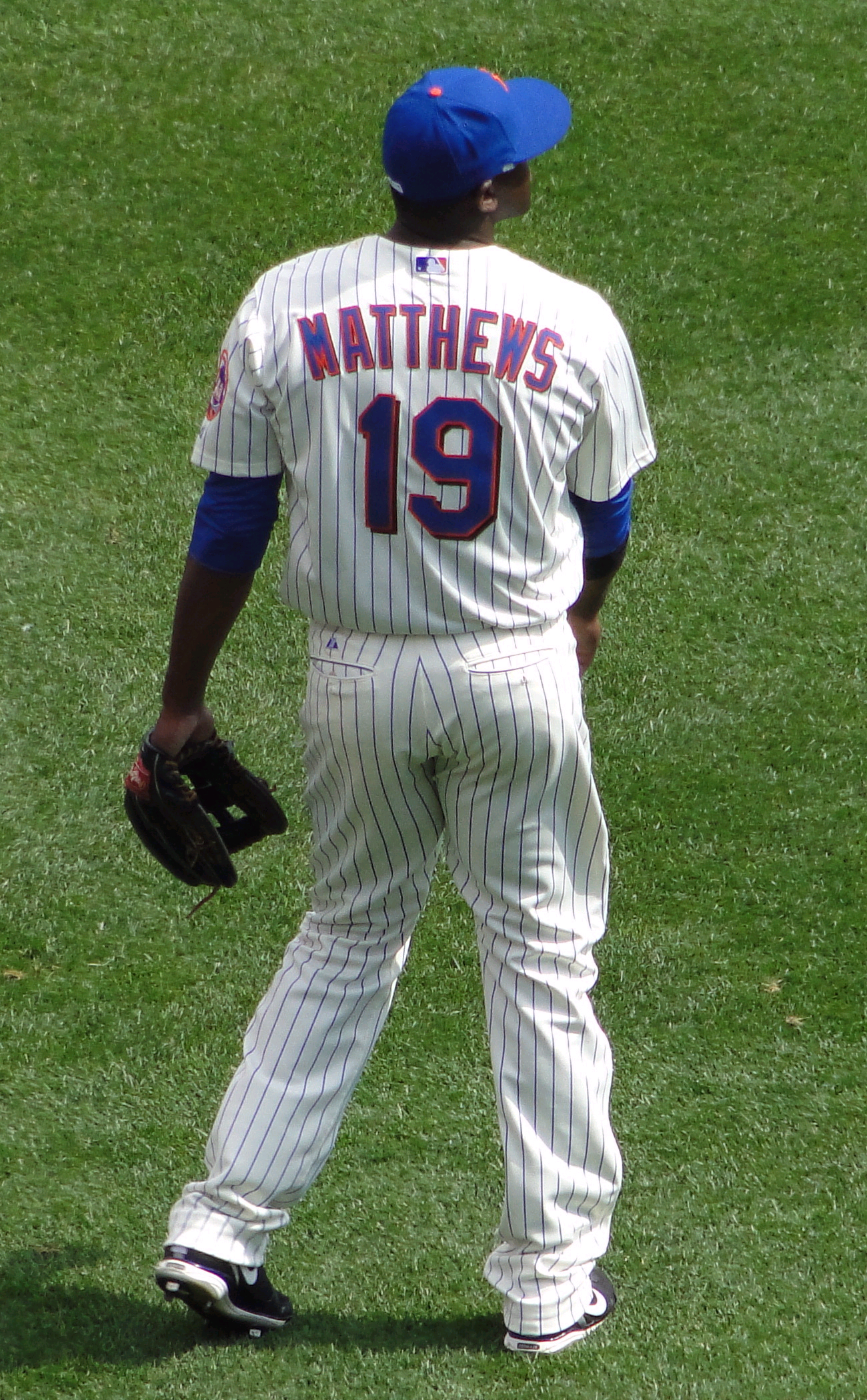
- Matthews with the New York Mets
- Outfielder
- Born: August 25, 1974 (age 51); San Francisco, California, U.S.
- Batted: Switch Threw: Right

MLB debut
- June 4, 1999, for the San Diego Padres

Last MLB appearance
- June 2, 2010, for the New York Mets

MLB statistics
- Batting average: .257
- Home runs: 108
- Runs batted in: 484
- Stats at Baseball Reference

Teams
- San Diego Padres (1999); Chicago Cubs (2000–2001); Pittsburgh Pirates (2001); New York Mets (2002); Baltimore Orioles (2002–2003); San Diego Padres (2003); Texas Rangers (2004–2006); Los Angeles Angels of Anaheim (2007–2009); New York Mets (2010)

Career highlights and awards
- All-Star (2006)

Gary Nathaniel Matthews Jr. (born August 25, 1974) is an American former professional baseball outfielder. He played Major League Baseball (MLB) from 1999 to 2010. Matthews is the son of the 1973 Rookie of the Year, 1979 All-Star, and former Philadelphia Phillies broadcaster Gary Matthews.

== Career ==
=== Early career ===
Matthews played baseball at Granada Hills Charter and Los Angeles Mission College before being selected in the 13th round of the 1993 Major League Baseball draft by the San Diego Padres. He began his career with the Padres in 1999 and has also played for the Brisbane Bandits of the Australian Baseball League, Chicago Cubs, Pittsburgh Pirates, New York Mets, Baltimore Orioles, Texas Rangers, and Los Angeles Angels of Anaheim. He was traded by the Mets to the Orioles for John Bale on April 3, 2002. Up until 2006, Matthews was not a big figure in baseball, getting only 2,167 at bats over his first seven years (1999–2005). During that time, he hit 59 home runs, stole 54 bases, batted .249 and had a .397 slugging percentage.

=== 2006 season ===
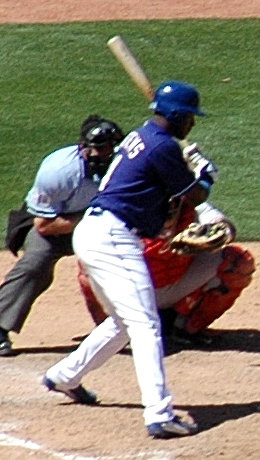
Matthews batting for the Texas Rangers in 2005

Matthews got off to a fine start in the 2006 season, and as a result he was chosen to play in the 2006 All-Star Game. He and his father were the 14th father-son combination to appear in an All-Star Game, as his father took part in the 1979 game.

Matthews is known for his jumping skills and flair for the dramatic in the field, often taking away what would be home runs in the process. His home run-stealing catch against Mike Lamb on July 1, 2006, was so outstanding, Lamb himself applauded after the play. Team radio announcer Eric Nadel said it was the best catch he's ever seen a Rangers outfielder make in his 26 years with the ballclub. It was later called the #1 defensive play ever performed by The Best Damn Sports Show Period.

On September 13 of the same year, Matthews hit for a natural cycle in a game against the Detroit Tigers, with a single for his first hit, a double for his second, a triple for his third, and a home run for his fourth.

After his fine performance in 2006, with 19 home runs, 79 RBIs, and 194 hits (including 44 doubles), and respected defensive work in the outfield, he was signed by the Angels to a 5-year contract worth $50 million. Many baseball writers such as ESPN's Rob Neyer have called it one of the worst contracts of all time, citing that Matthews' prior performance was never good enough to deserve it and that his subsequent drop-off should have been predictable to the Angels.

=== Human growth hormone controversy ===
On February 27, 2007, the Times Union, an Albany, New York newspaper, reported an investigation regarding a steroid ring that involved more than two dozen doctors, pharmacists and business owners who have been, or will be, arrested in Alabama, Texas, Florida and New York. The investigation uncovered evidence that testosterone and other performance-enhancing drugs were purchased by current and former MLB players, NFL players, college athletes, high school coaches, a former Mr. Olympia champion and another leading contender in the bodybuilding competition. One of the baseball players named was Gary Matthews Jr. The evidence listed led to Matthews being named in the Mitchell Report. As a result of being naming in the report, he was given the derogatory nickname Gary Matthews Juicer.

In coordination with the team's wish that Matthews make a statement on the matter, he denied using HGH. The Angels had reportedly threatened to void Matthew's five-year, $50 million contract if he did not give a response to the allegations. If he in fact took human growth hormone (HGH) prior to its addition to Major League Baseball's "banned substances list" in 2005, then he would be "grandfathered in", therefore resulting in no punishment but a stern warning, if anything, never to use HGH or any other substance banned by MLB in an attempt to further enhance his playing abilities.

=== 2008 season ===
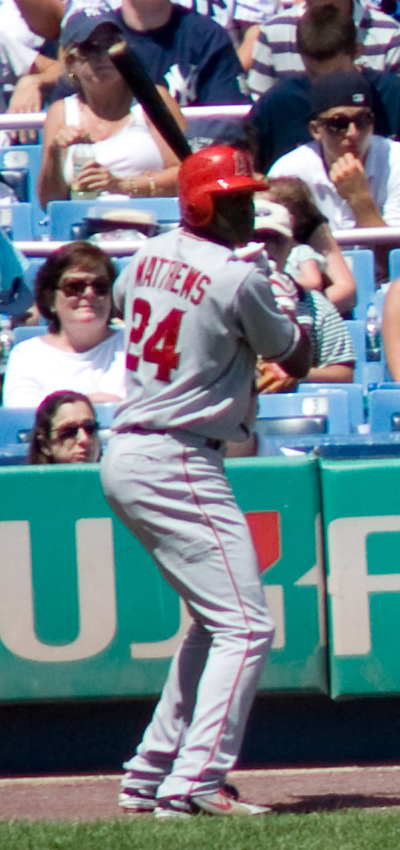
Matthews with the Los Angeles Angels of Anaheim in 2008

Matthews had 8 home runs and batted .242 for the 2008 season.

=== 2009 season ===
On July 10, 2009, he got his 1,000th hit against Joba Chamberlain of the New York Yankees in the second inning. Matthews was the last hitter of the Angels 2009 season, striking out against Mariano Rivera to end game six of the 2009 American League Championship Series.

=== 2009–2010 offseason and trade to Mets ===
After the end of the season, Matthews went public with his desire to be traded to another team in spite of having two years left on his contract. "I don't expect to be back; it's time to move on", Matthews said. "I'm ready to play for an organization that wants me to play every day. This organization has other plans, and that's OK." The OC Register's Sam Miller doubted Matthews could find a job with another team, comparing him to other aging player with similar attributes. While calling Matthews' contract the sixth biggest franchise-killer, SI.com said the trade outlook for Matthew was not good. "The Angels are reportedly shopping Matthews, but it's hard to imagine any takers unless L.A. eats most or all of his remaining salary."

On January 22, 2010, Matthews was traded to the New York Mets for relief pitcher Brian Stokes. The Angels picked up $21.5 of the $23.5 million left on Matthews' contract. The trade was met with widespread surprise. Buster Olney, writing for espn.com, wrote the Mets were "seeing something in him that other teams are not seeing." Quoting an anonymous talent evaluator for a Major League team, "Matthews is a player to be avoided. Slow bat. Declining range. And above all else, a player who wants to be a regular and will be an unhappy distraction in your clubhouse when he's not in the lineup every day", while another executive called the move 'baffling.' Fangraphs' Matthew Carruth called the trade "close to a wash" while Rob Neyer of ESPN.com said "One might argue that the Mets just gave up something for less than nothing." With regular center fielder Carlos Beltrán out after having undergone surgery, Matthews was the starting center fielder for the Mets on opening day.

On June 4, Matthews was designated for assignment after batting .190 in 58 ABs. On June 15 Matthews was released by the Mets. He signed a minor-league contract by the Cincinnati Reds on June 23. He was assigned to Triple-A Louisville, where he hit .313/.359/.490. However, he was not promoted to the majors, and on July 24, he opted out of his contract with the Reds and became a free agent.

== Coaching career ==
Matthews served as the first base coach for the National League team in the 2024 All-Star Futures Game.

== Awards ==
- 2006 American League All Star

== See also ==
- List of second-generation Major League Baseball players
- List of Major League Baseball players to hit for the cycle
- List of Major League Baseball players named in the Mitchell Report

Achievements
Preceded by Carlos Guillén	Hitting for the cycle September 13, 2006	Succeeded by Chone Figgins
