= Alex Serrano (baseball) =

Venezuelan baseball player (born 1981)

- Relief pitcher
- Born: February 18, 1981 (age 45); Barcelona, Anzoátegui State, Venezuela
- Batted: Right Threw: Right

MLB debut
- April 16, 2008, for the Los Angeles Angels of Anaheim

Last MLB appearance
- April 16, 2008, for the Los Angeles Angels of Anaheim

MLB statistics
- Win–loss record: 0-0
- Earned run average: 0.00
- Strikeouts: 1
- Stats at Baseball Reference

Teams
- Los Angeles Angels of Anaheim (2008)

Alex Eleazar Serrano Hernandez (born February 18, 1981) is a Venezuelan former professional baseball relief pitcher. He played in Major League Baseball (MLB) for the Los Angeles Angels of Anaheim.

== Career ==
On April 16, 2008, Serrano made his major league debut for the Los Angeles Angels of Anaheim against the Kansas City Royals, pitching one scoreless inning while striking out one.

Serrano became a free agent at the end of 2008. He spent 2009 in the Mexican League with the Guerreros de Oaxaca. He last played for the Rimini Baseball Club in the Italian Italian Baseball League in 2010.

== See also ==
- List of Major League Baseball players from Venezuela
