= Scot Shields =

American baseball player (born 1975)

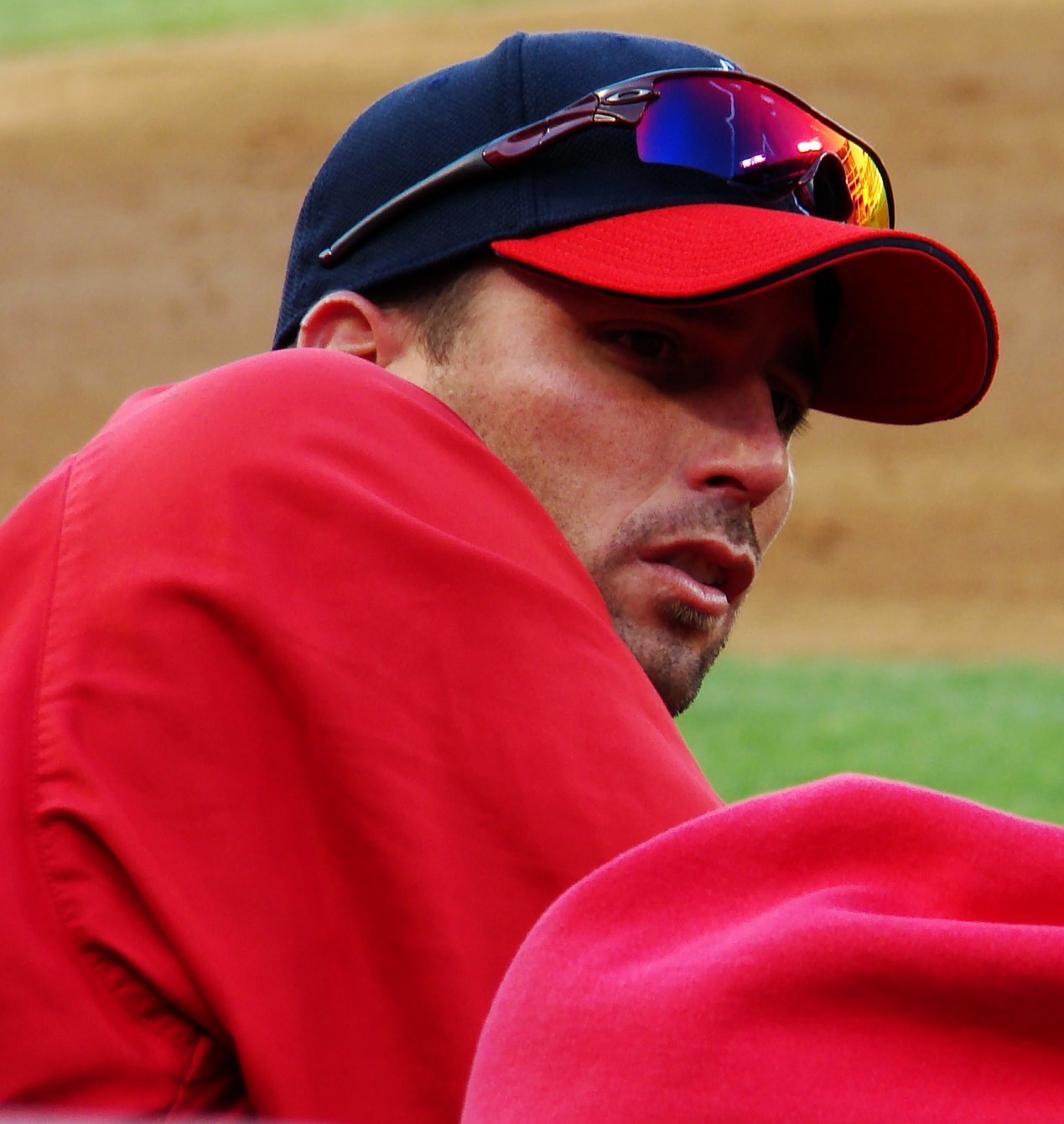
- Shields in 2007
- Pitcher
- Born: July 22, 1975 (age 50); Fort Lauderdale, Florida, U.S.
- Batted: Right Threw: Right

MLB debut
- May 26, 2001, for the Anaheim Angels

Last MLB appearance
- September 7, 2010, for the Los Angeles Angels of Anaheim

MLB statistics
- Win–loss record: 46–44
- Earned run average: 3.18
- Strikeouts: 631
- Stats at Baseball Reference

Teams
- Anaheim / Los Angeles Angels of Anaheim (2001–2010)

Career highlights and awards
- World Series champion (2002)

Robert Scot Shields (born July 22, 1975) is an American former professional baseball relief pitcher. He played his entire baseball career with the Los Angeles Angels of Anaheim of Major League Baseball (MLB). He was the last member of the Angels' 2002 World Series championship team remaining on the team's roster when he announced his retirement in 2011. Shields pitched in 491 games for the Angels, ranking him second all-time in games pitched for the team behind Troy Percival (579).

== Minor league career ==
He graduated from Fort Lauderdale High School and attended Lincoln Memorial University while majoring in kinesiology. He was drafted by the then-Anaheim Angels in the 38th round (1137th overall) of the 1997 MLB draft.

He began his career as a reliever in 1997 with Low-A Boise, earning a 7-2 record with two saves and a 2.94 ERA. The next year, he moved to Single-A Cedar Rapids, compiling a 6-5 record, seven saves and a 3.65 ERA. In 1999, he split his time as a starter and a reliever at High-A Lake Elsinore, gaining a 10-3 record with a 2.52 ERA and one save. In nine starts, he pitched two complete games and one shutout. For his efforts that year, he was named Angels Minor League Pitcher of the Year. He was promoted to Triple-A Edmonton in 2000, where he struggled with a 7-13 record and a 5.41 ERA.

== Major league career ==
Though he started the 2001 season with the Triple-A Salt Lake Stingers, Shields was called up to MLB on May 25, making his debut against Tampa Bay Rays on May 26, pitching one-plus innings and allowing one hit and one walk. He was optioned back to Salt Lake, but was recalled on June 27. In eight relief appearances with the Angels, Shields allowed eight hits and seven walks before being optioned back to Salt Lake, where he stayed for the remainder of the season.

Though he began 2002 with the Stingers, Shields was recalled to the major leagues on June 14, this time for good. In his final 38 relief appearances, he allowed only seven earned runs, only allowing opponents a .176 average, the best in the league. He also started for the club on September 27 against the Seattle Mariners, receiving a no-decision and allowing four hits and two earned runs while striking out two.

Shields was a fixture in the Angels bullpen after the 2002 campaign. He was a member of the 2002 World Series Championship team, but did not fare well in the postseason—he allowed two home runs in 1 2/3 innings in Game 5 of the Series, his only appearance in the playoffs that year.

Shields began 2003, his first full year in the majors, in the bullpen. He posted a 1.68 ERA, working at least three innings twelve times. He led the American League with 69 2/3 innings of relief before moving into the Angels' starting rotation to end the season in August. As a starter, Shields was 4-6 with a 3.89 ERA, pitching at least seven innings in six of his thirteen starts. He ended the season with a 5-6 record and a 2.85 ERA.

For the 2004 campaign, Shields returned to the Angels bullpen. He pitched 22 consecutive shutout innings from May 9 to June 11, and worked three scoreless innings five times during the season. With fellow reliever Francisco Rodríguez, he was part of the first pair of relievers to post 100 strikeouts in one season since 1997, and was third in the American League in strikeouts with 109. In the post-season that year, he struggled in two appearances during the ALDS, pitching three innings and allowing two earned runs with a 6.00 ERA.

When Rodríguez replaced veteran Troy Percival as the Angels' closer in 2005, Shields emerged as the club's trusted setup man, pitching the eighth inning as the bridge to Francisco. In this capacity, he led the American League with 91 2/3 innings of relief pitching, and ranked second with 98 strikeouts and 32 holds. When Francisco was placed on the disabled list from May 15 to May 31, Shields stood in as the club's closer, earning five saves in six save opportunities. Overall, Shields posted a 10-11 record with a 2.75 ERA.

Shields represented the United States in the 2006 World Baseball Classic, the only member of the Angels to play for the USA squad. Shields finished the 2006 season with a 7-7 record, an ERA of 2.87 and 84 strikeouts. He led the league in holds with 31, and was second among American League relief pitchers in innings pitched with 87 2/3 innings.

Shields' 2007 season saw his ERA rise to 3.86 as he also failed to surpass 80 innings. He finished 4-5 in 71 games. In 2008, Shields had a career low 2.70 ERA in 64 games.

Early in the 2009 season, he had to receive surgery on his left leg which forced him onto the disabled list for the remainder of the season. He finished with only 20 appearances on the season.

Shields was the team's setup man for the Angels prior to his surgery, holding the lead if necessary in the 8th and sometimes both 7th and 8th innings until the Angels go to closer Brian Fuentes.

After the surgery, Shields was not the same for the 2010 season. He pitched in 43 games while also starting a game for the first time since 2003. His ERA rose to 5.28 while also walking 34 in only 46 innings. His control issues were due to the injury he sustained in the previous year.

Shields retired after the end of the 2010 season. In 2011, he was named by Sports Illustrated as the "Setup Man of the Decade."

== Pitches and abilities ==
He is highly praised not only for the quality of his performance, but for his versatility. In his career with the Angels, he has served as a starter, long reliever, middle reliever, setup man, and closer, depending on the needs of the team at the time. Shields is known to have a "rubber arm", meaning he has excellent endurance and does not need to ice his arm after pitching. During college, he once pitched a game of 16 innings, throwing 261 pitches. He throws a hard, sinking fastball that clocks anywhere between 92 and 95 MPH, and a slurve. He is most famous though for throwing his 2-seam/No-seam fastball with tremendous movement.

== See also ==
- List of Major League Baseball single-inning strikeout leaders
- List of Major League Baseball players who spent their entire career with one franchise
