= 2009 Los Angeles Angels season =

Major League Baseball season

2009 Los Angeles Angels
- American League West champions
- League: American League
- Division: West
- Ballpark: Angel Stadium
- City: Anaheim, California
- Record: 97–65 (.599)
- Divisional place: 1st
- Owner: Arte Moreno
- General manager: Tony Reagins
- Manager: Mike Scioscia
- Television: FSN West; KCOP (My 13); Mark Gubicza, Rex Hudler, Steve Physioc
- Radio: KLAA; Rory Markas, Terry Smith, José Mota
- Stats: ESPN.com; Baseball Reference

The 2009 Los Angeles Angels season was the franchise's 49th season. The Angels began the season as the two-time defending American League West champions.

Perhaps the most notable player to depart in the off-season due to free agency was the longtime closing pitcher, Francisco Rodríguez, who signed with the New York Mets. Other notable free agent departures were 2008 acquisitions Jon Garland (Arizona Diamondbacks) and Mark Teixeira (New York Yankees). Notable free agent acquisitions included new closer Brian Fuentes, previously of the Colorado Rockies, and Bobby Abreu, previously of the Yankees.

Tragedy struck the Angels twice this season. Preston Gómez, the team's special assistant to the general manager, died January 13 of injuries sustained when he was struck by a car in Blythe, California on March 26, 2008. As a tribute, the Angels began the season wearing black "PRESTON" patches on their left sleeve. Then, on April 9, rookie pitcher, Nick Adenhart, was killed in a car accident in Fullerton, California, hours after pitching 6 shutout innings against the Oakland Athletics in his first start of the season. As a tribute, the Angels continued to assign a locker to Adenhart at home and on the road, hang a jersey with his name and number in their dugout, and wear black patches with his name and number on their left breast for the rest of the season.

On September 28, the Angels clinched the American League West division title, their eighth in franchise history.

== Regular season ==
=== Season standings ===
AL West
Team	W	L	Pct.	GB	Home	Road
Los Angeles Angels	97	65	.599	—	49‍–‍32	48‍–‍33
Texas Rangers	87	75	.537	10	48‍–‍33	39‍–‍42
Seattle Mariners	85	77	.525	12	48‍–‍33	37‍–‍44
Oakland Athletics	75	87	.463	22	40‍–‍41	35‍–‍46

=== Record vs. opponents ===
2009 American League record Source: MLB Standings Grid – 2009
Team	BAL	BOS	CWS	CLE	DET	KC	LAA	MIN	NYY	OAK	SEA	TB	TEX	TOR	NL
Baltimore	–	2–16	5–4	2–5	3–5	4–4	2–8	3–2	5–13	1–5	4–5	8–10	5–5	9–9	11–7
Boston	16–2	–	4–4	7–2	6–1	5–3	4–5	4–2	9–9	5–5	2–4	9–9	2–7	11–7	11–7
Chicago	4–5	4−4	–	10–8	9–9	9–9	5–4	6−12	3–4	4–5	4–5	6–2	2–4	1–6	12–6
Cleveland	5–2	2–7	8–10	–	4–14	10–8	2–4	8–10	3–5	2–5	6–4	5–3	1–8	4–4	5–13
Detroit	5–3	1–6	9–9	14–4	–	9–9	5–4	7–12	1–5	5–4	5–4	5–2	7–2	3–5	10–8
Kansas City	4–4	3–5	9–9	8–10	9–9	–	1–9	6–12	2–4	2–6	5–4	1–9	3–3	4–3	8–10
Los Angeles	8–2	5–4	4–5	4–2	4–5	9–1	–	6–4	5–5	12–7	10–9	4–2	8–11	4–4	14–4
Minnesota	2–3	2–4	12–6	10–8	12–7	12–6	4–6	–	0–7	4–6	5–5	3–3	6–4	3–5	12–6
New York	13–5	9–9	4–3	5–3	5–1	4–2	5–5	7–0	–	7–2	6–4	11–7	5–4	12–6	10–8
Oakland	5–1	5–5	5–4	5–2	4–5	6–2	7–12	6–4	2–7	–	5–14	6–4	11–8	3–6	5–13
Seattle	5–4	4–2	5–4	4–6	4–5	4–5	9–10	5–5	4–6	14–5	–	5–3	8–11	3–4	11–7
Tampa Bay	10–8	9–9	2–6	3–5	2–5	9–1	2–4	3–3	7–11	4–6	3–5	–	3–6	14–4	13–5
Texas	5–5	7–2	4–2	8–1	2–7	3–3	11–8	4–6	4–5	8–11	11–8	6–3	–	5–5	9–9
Toronto	9–9	7–11	6–1	4–4	5–3	3–4	4–4	5–3	6–12	6–3	4–3	4–14	5–5	–	7–11

- Source: MLB Standings Grid – 2009

=== Roster ===
2009 Los Angeles Angels
Roster
Pitchers: 34 Nick Adenhart; 66 José Arredondo; 70 Trevor Bell; 52 Jason Bulger; 37 Daniel Davidson; 45 Kelvim Escobar; 40 Brian Fuentes; 65 Kevin Jepsen; 22 Scott Kazmir; 41 John Lackey; 68 Shane Loux; 60 Robert Mosebach; 58 Dustin Moseley; 55 Sean O'Sullivan; 38 Darren Oliver; 49 Anthony Ortega; 32 Matt Palmer; 56 Fernando Rodriguez; 59 Rafael Rodríguez; 54 Ervin Santana; 51 Joe Saunders; 62 Scot Shields; 33 Justin Speier; 63 Rich Thompson; 36 Jered Weaver	Catchers: 28 Ryan Budde; 5 Jeff Mathis; 44 Mike Napoli; 46 Bobby Wilson; Infielders: 2 Erick Aybar; 9 Chone Figgins; 13 Maicer Izturis; 47 Howie Kendrick; 19 Kendrys Morales; 39 Robb Quinlan; 18 Sean Rodriguez; 12 Freddy Sandoval; 3 Brandon Wood; Outfielders: 53 Bobby Abreu; 64 Terry Evans; 27 Vladimir Guerrero; 48 Torii Hunter; 24 Gary Matthews, Jr.; 33 Chris Pettit; 20 Juan Rivera; 77 Reggie Willits	Manager: 14 Mike Scioscia; Coaches: 23 Mike Butcher (pitching); 21 Dino Ebel (third base); 4 Alfredo Griffin (first base); 7 Mickey Hatcher (hitting); 88 Orlando Mercado (bullpen); 10 Ron Roenicke (bench); 61 Steve Soliz

=== Game log ===
2009 game log
April (9–12)

#	Date	Opponent	Score	Win	Loss	Save	Attendance	Record	Stadium	Box	GB
1	April 6	Athletics	3–0	Saunders (1–0)	Braden (0–1)	Fuentes (1)	43,220	1–0	Angel Stadium	W1	0
2	April 7	Athletics	6–4	Wuertz (1–0)	Jepsen (0–1)	Ziegler (1)	43,396	1–1	Angel Stadium	L1	-½
3	April 8	Athletics	6–4	Bailey (1–0)	Fuentes (0–1)	Ziegler (2)	43,283	1–2	Angel Stadium	L2	-1½
	April 9	Athletics	Postponed (death of P Nick Adenhart); rescheduled for August 27					1–2	Angel Stadium		-2
4	April 10	Red Sox	6–3	Weaver (1–0)	Wakefield (0–1)	Shields (1)	41,385	2–2	Angel Stadium	W1	-1
5	April 11	Red Sox	5–4	Penny (1–0)	Saunders (1–1)	Papelbon (2)	40,163	2–3	Angel Stadium	L1	-1½
6	April 12	Red Sox	5–4	Moseley (1–0)	Beckett (1–1)	Fuentes (2)	38,076	3–3	Angel Stadium	W1	-1½
7	April 14	@ Mariners	3–2 (10)	Corcoran (1–0)	Shields (0–1)		45,958	3–4	Safeco Field	L1	-2½
8	April 15	@ Mariners	11–3	Washburn (2–0)	Weaver (1–1)		18,516	3–5	Safeco Field	L2	-3½
9	April 16	@ Mariners	5–1	Saunders (2–1)	Jakubauskas (1–1)		18,528	4–5	Safeco Field	W1	-2½
10	April 17	@ Twins	11–9	Guerrier (1–0)	Bulger (0–1)	Nathan (2)	24,168	4–6	HHH Metrodome	L1	-3½
11	April 18	@ Twins	9–2	Slowey (2–0)	Jepsen (0–2)		34,286	4–7	HHH Metrodome	L2	-3½
12	April 19	@ Twins	3–1	Perkins (1–1)	Loux (0–1)	Nathan (3)	28,302	4–8	HHH Metrodome	L3	-3½
13	April 21	Tigers	4–3	Arredondo (1–0)	Lyon (1–2)	Fuentes (3)	41,627	5–8	Angel Stadium	W1	-3½
14	April 22	Tigers	12–10	Rincón (1–0)	Shields (0–2)		43,047	5–9	Angel Stadium	L1	-3½
15	April 23	Tigers	10–5	Palmer (1–0)	Jackson (1–1)		38,543	6–9	Angel Stadium	W1	-3½
16	April 24	Mariners	8–3	Bédard (2–1)	Loux (0–2)		43,083	6–10	Angel Stadium	L1	-4½
17	April 25	Mariners	9–8	Silva (1–2)	Ortega (0–1)	Aardsma (3)	43,542	6–11	Angel Stadium	L2	-5½
18	April 26	Mariners	8–0	Weaver (2–1)	Washburn (3–1)		43,057	7–11	Angel Stadium	W1	-4½
19	April 28	@ Orioles	7–5	Saunders (3–1)	Eaton (1–3)	Fuentes (4)	11,857	8–11	Oriole Park at Camden Yards	W2	-4
20	April 29	@ Orioles	3–2	Loux (1–2)	Uehara (2–2)	Fuentes (5)	14,203	9–11	Oriole Park at Camden Yards	W3	-3
21	April 30	@ Yankees	7–4	Coke (1–1)	Speier (0–1)	Rivera (5)	43,388	9–12	Yankee Stadium	L1	-3½

May (16–12)

#	Date	Opponent	Score	Win	Loss	Save	Attendance	Record	Stadium	Box	GB
22	May 1	@ Yankees	10–9	Albaladejo (2–1)	Fuentes (0–2)		44,058	9–13	Yankee Stadium	L2	-4½
23	May 2	@ Yankees	8–4	Palmer (2–0)	Sabathia (1–3)		44,970	10–13	Yankee Stadium	W1	-3½
	May 3	@ Yankees	Postponed (rain); rescheduled for September 14						Yankee Stadium		-4
24	May 4	@ Athletics	5–2	Saunders (4–1)	Anderson (0–3)	Fuentes (6)	10,397	11–13	Oakland-Alameda Coliseum	W2	-3
25	May 5	@ Athletics	5–3	Loux (2–2)	Braden (3–3)	Fuentes (7)	13,298	12–13	Oakland-Alameda Coliseum	W3	-2
26	May 6	Blue Jays	13–1	Halladay (6–1)	Ortega (0–2)		41,123	12–14	Angel Stadium	L1	-2½
27	May 7	Blue Jays	6–1	Weaver (3–1)	Ray (0–1)		41,007	13–14	Angel Stadium	W1	-1½
28	May 8	Royals	4–1	Palmer (3–0)	Meche (2–3)	Fuentes (8)	41,019	14–14	Angel Stadium	W2	-1½
29	May 9	Royals	1–0	Saunders (5–1)	Greinke (6–1)		39,776	15–14	Angel Stadium	W3	-½
30	May 10	Royals	4–3	Shields (1–2)	Wright (0–1)	Fuentes (9)	43,646	16–14	Angel Stadium	W4	-½
31	May 12	Red Sox	4–3	R. Ramírez (4–0)	Shields (1–3)	Papelbon (9)	33,411	16–15	Angel Stadium	L1	-1½
32	May 13	Red Sox	8–4	Palmer (4–0)	Wakefield (4–2)		35,666	17–15	Angel Stadium	W1	-1½
33	May 14	Red Sox	5–4 (12)	Bulger (1–1)	Delcarmen (1–1)		35,124	18–15	Angel Stadium	W2	-1½
34	May 15	@ Rangers	10–8	Millwood (4–3)	Saunders (5–2)	Wilson (1)	33,429	18–16	Rangers Ballpark in Arlington	L1	-2½
35	May 16	@ Rangers	5–3	Padilla (3–2)	Loux (2–3)	Wilson (2)	34,284	18–17	Rangers Ballpark in Arlington	L2	-3½
36	May 17	@ Rangers	3–0	Jennings (1–1)	Weaver (3–2)	O'Day (1)	37,146	18–18	Rangers Ballpark in Arlington	L3	-4½
37	May 18	@ Mariners	10–6	Lackey (1–0)	Washburn (3–3)		17,340	19–18	Safeco Field	W1	-4
38	May 19	@ Mariners	6–5	Palmer (5–0)	Hernández (4–3)	Fuentes (10)	16,002	20–18	Safeco Field	W2	-3
39	May 20	@ Mariners	1–0	Jakubauskas (3–4)	Santana (0–1)	Aardsma (5)	18,580	20–19	Safeco Field	L1	-3
40	May 21	@ Mariners	3–0	Saunders (6–2)	Bédard (2–2)	Fuentes (11)	18,468	21–19	Safeco Field	W1	-2
41	May 22	@ Dodgers	3–1	Oliver (1–0)	Wade (0–3)	Fuentes (12)	55,053	22–19	Dodger Stadium	W2	-2
42	May 23	@ Dodgers	5–4 (10)	Broxton (5–0)	Arredondo (1–1)		55,301	22–20	Dodger Stadium	L1	-3
43	May 24	@ Dodgers	10–7	Bulger (2–1)	Billingsley (6–2)		54,122	23–20	Dodger Stadium	W1	-3
44	May 25	White Sox	17–3	Danks (4–3)	Santana (0–2)		43,177	23–21	Angel Stadium	L1	-3
45	May 26	White Sox	4–2	Colón (3–4)	Saunders (6–3)	Linebrink (1)	38,040	23–22	Angel Stadium	L2	-4
46	May 27	White Sox	3–1	Weaver (4–2)	Floyd (3–5)	Fuentes (13)	40,169	24–22	Angel Stadium	W1	-3
47	May 29	Mariners	5–2	Vargas (2–0)	Lackey (1–1)	Aardsma (7)	38,492	24–23	Angel Stadium	L1	-4½
48	May 30	Mariners	4–3 (10)	Batista (3–1)	Arredondo (1–2)	Aardsma (8)	39,329	24–24	Angel Stadium	L2	-5½
49	May 31	Mariners	9–8	Speier (1–1)	Aardsma (1–2)		38,632	25–24	Angel Stadium	W1	-4½

June (17–9)

#	Date	Opponent	Score	Win	Loss	Save	Attendance	Record	Stadium	Box	GB
50	June 2	@ Blue Jays	6–4	Halladay (9–1)	Saunders (6–4)		26,809	25–25	Rogers Centre	L1	-4½
51	June 3	@ Blue Jays	8–1	Weaver (5–2)	Janssen (1–2)		17,127	26–25	Rogers Centre	W1	-4½
52	June 4	@ Blue Jays	6–5	Speier (2–1)	League (1–2)	Fuentes (14)	31,163	27–25	Rogers Centre	W2	-3½
53	June 5	@ Tigers	2–1	Santana (1–2)	Rodney (0–1)	Fuentes (15)	31,187	28–25	Comerica Park	W3	-3½
54	June 6	@ Tigers	2–1	Jackson (6–3)	Escobar (0–1)		32,367	28–26	Comerica Park	L1	-3½
55	June 7	@ Tigers	9–6	Zumaya (2–0)	Arredondo (1–3)		32,074	28–27	Comerica Park	L2	-4½
56	June 9	@ Rays	4–3	Weaver (6–2)	Shields (5–5)	Fuentes (16)	16,087	29–27	Tropicana Field	W1	-3
57	June 10	@ Rays	9–5	Cormier (1–1)	Lackey (1–2)		15,658	29–28	Tropicana Field	L1	-3½
58	June 11	@ Rays	11–1	Balfour (3–1)	Santana (1–3)		17,086	29–29	Tropicana Field	L2	-4½
59	June 12	Padres	11–6	Palmer (6–0)	Gaudin (2–5)		41,597	30–29	Angel Stadium	W1	-4½
60	June 13	Padres	9–1	Saunders (7–4)	Geer (1–2)		43,233	31–29	Angel Stadium	W2	-3½
61	June 14	Padres	6–0	Weaver (7–2)	Young (4–6)		40,163	32–29	Angel Stadium	W3	-3½
62	June 15	@ Giants	9–7	Lackey (2–2)	Zito (3–7)	Fuentes (17)	33,613	33–29	AT&T Park	W4	-2½
63	June 16	@ Giants	8–1	O'Sullivan (1–0)	Sánchez (2–7)		34,716	34–29	AT&T Park	W5	-2
64	June 17	@ Giants	4–3	Jepsen (1–2)	Lincecum (6–2)	Fuentes (18)	37,431	35–29	AT&T Park	W6	-2
65	June 19	Dodgers	5–4	Speier (3–1)	Mota (3–2)	Fuentes (19)	44,222	36–29	Angel Stadium	W7	-½
66	June 20	Dodgers	6–4	Jeff Weaver (4–1)	Weaver (7–3)		44,148	36–30	Angel Stadium	L1	-½
67	June 21	Dodgers	5–3	Kershaw (4–5)	Lackey (2–3)	Broxton (17)	43,891	36–31	Angel Stadium	L2	-½
68	June 22	Rockies	11–1	Cook (7–3)	Palmer (6–1)		39,557	36–32	Angel Stadium	L3	-1
69	June 23	Rockies	4–3	Jepsen (2–2)	Jiménez (6–7)	Fuentes (20)	42,233	37–32	Angel Stadium	W1	0
70	June 24	Rockies	11–3	Saunders (8–4)	Marquis (9–5)		43,551	38–32	Angel Stadium	W2	0
71	June 26	@ Diamondbacks	12–3	Weaver (8–3)	Buckner (2–5)		24,870	39–32	Chase Field	W3	-½
72	June 27	@ Diamondbacks	2–1	Oliver (2–0)	Qualls (1–1)	Fuentes (21)	27,742	40–32	Chase Field	W4	+½
73	June 28	@ Diamondbacks	12–8	Palmer (7–1)	Scherzer (5–5)		25,684	41–32	Chase Field	W5	+1½
74	June 29	@ Rangers	5–2	O'Sullivan (2–0)	Padilla (6–4)	Fuentes (22)	16,985	42–32	Rangers Ballpark in Arlington	W6	+2½
75	June 30	@ Rangers	9–5	Feldman (6–2)	Saunders (8–5)		20,042	42–33	Rangers Ballpark in Arlington	L1	+1½

July (17–7)

#	Date	Opponent	Score	Win	Loss	Save	Attendance	Record	Stadium	Box	GB
76	July 1	@ Rangers	9–7	Francisco (2–1)	Speier (3–2)		27,142	42–34	Rangers Ballpark in Arlington	L2	+½
77	July 2	Orioles	5–2	Lackey (3–3)	Guthrie (6–8)	Fuentes (23)	39,180	43–34	Angel Stadium	W1	+1
78	July 3	Orioles	6–4	Hernandez (2–2)	Santana (1–4)	Sherrill (18)	39,104	43–35	Angel Stadium	L1	0
79	July 4	Orioles	11–4	Bulger (3–1)	Báez (4–3)		41,764	44–35	Angel Stadium	W1	0
80	July 5	Orioles	9–6	Oliver (3–0)	Albers (1–3)	Fuentes (24)	35,912	45–35	Angel Stadium	W2	0
81	July 6	Rangers	9–4	Weaver (9–3)	Millwood (8–6)		35,691	46–35	Angel Stadium	W3	+1
82	July 7	Rangers	8–5	Holland (3–5)	Lackey (3–4)		42,088	46–36	Angel Stadium	L1	0
83	July 8	Rangers	8–1	Padilla (7–4)	Santana (1–5)		37,364	46–37	Angel Stadium	L2	-1
84	July 10	Yankees	10–6	Bulger (4–1)	Melancon (0–1)	Fuentes (25)	44,076	47–37	Angel Stadium	W1	-½
85	July 11	Yankees	14–8	Weaver (10–3)	Pettitte (8–5)		42,602	48–37	Angel Stadium	W2	+½
86	July 12	Yankees	5–4	Lackey (4–4)	Sabathia (8–6)	Fuentes (26)	41,532	49–37	Angel Stadium	W3	+1½
July 14: All-Star Game (AL wins—Box)			4–3	Papelbon (BOS)	Bell (SD)	Rivera (NYY)	46,760		Busch Stadium	St. Louis, Missouri	
87	July 16	@ Athletics	6–2	Santana (2–3)	Braden (7–8)	Fuentes (27)	11,113	50–37	Oakland-Alameda Coliseum	W4	+2
88	July 17	@ Athletics	7–3	Breslow (2–4)	Saunders (8–6)		17,147	50–38	Oakland-Alameda Coliseum	L1	+2
89	July 18	@ Athletics	11–6	Oliver (4–0)	Mazzaro (2–6)		16,475	51–38	Oakland-Alameda Coliseum	W1	+3
90	July 19	@ Athletics	1–0 (10)	Lackey (5–4)	Bailey (4–2)	Fuentes (28)	18,539	52–38	Oakland-Alameda Coliseum	W2	+3
	July 20	@ Royals	Postponed (rain); rescheduled for July 21					52–38	Kauffman Stadium		+2½
91	July 21	@ Royals	8–5	Santana (3–5)	Ponson (1–6)	Fuentes (29)	N/A	53–38	Kauffman Stadium	W3	+3
92	July 21	@ Royals	10–2	O'Sullivan (3–0)	Chen (0–5)		23,874	54–38	Kauffman Stadium	W4	+3
93	July 22	@ Royals	9–6	Speier (4–2)	Colón (1–1)	Fuentes (30)	18,078	55–38	Kauffman Stadium	W5	+3
94	July 23	Twins	6–5 (10)	Fuentes (1–2)	Crain (2–4)		38,145	56–38	Angel Stadium	W6	+3½
95	July 24	Twins	6–3	Lackey (6–4)	Liriano (4–10)		39,272	57–38	Angel Stadium	W7	+3½
96	July 25	Twins	11–5	Palmer (8–1)	Blackburn (8–5)		35,922	58–38	Angel Stadium	W8	+4½
97	July 26	Twins	10–1	Swarzak (3–3)	Santana (3–6)		36,386	58–39	Angel Stadium	L1	+3½
98	July 27	Indians	8–6	Veras (4–1)	Fuentes (1–3)	Wood (14)	35,371	58–40	Angel Stadium	L2	+2½
99	July 28	Indians	7–6	Palmer (9–1)	Huff (5–5)	Bulger (1)	43,270	59–40	Angel Stadium	W1	+2½
100	July 29	Indians	9–3	Lackey (7–4)	Laffey (4–3)		39,196	60–40	Angel Stadium	W2	+3½
101	July 31	@ Twins	11–5 (11)	Jepsen (3–2)	Keppel (0–1)		31,767	61–40	HHH Metrodome	W3	+3

August (17–12)

#	Date	Opponent	Score	Win	Loss	Save	Attendance	Record	Stadium	Box	GB
102	August 1	@ Twins	11–6	Saunders (9–6)	Swarzak (3–4)		40,828	62–40	HHH Metrodome	W4	+4
103	August 2	@ Twins	13–4	Weaver (11–3)	Perkins (6–7)		41,079	63–40	HHH Metrodome	W5	+4
104	August 4	@ White Sox	5–4	Thornton (6–2)	Jepsen (3–3)		30,228	63–41	U.S. Cellular Field	L1	+4½
105	August 5	@ White Sox	6–2	Floyd (9–6)	O'Sullivan (3–1)		32,167	63–42	U.S. Cellular Field	L2	+4½
106	August 6	@ White Sox	9–5	Santana (4–6)	Danks (9–8)		27,487	64–42	U.S. Cellular Field	W1	+4½
107	August 7	Rangers	11–6	Feldman (11–4)	Saunders (9–7)		43,624	64–43	Angel Stadium	L1	+3½
108	August 8	Rangers	3–2	Weaver (12–3)	Guardado (1–2)	Fuentes (31)	37,166	65–43	Angel Stadium	W1	+4½
109	August 9	Rangers	0–7	Holland (5–7)	Lackey (7–5)		35,706	65–44	Angel Stadium	L1	+3½
110	August 10	Rays	8–6	Jepsen (4–3)	Springer (0–2)	Fuentes (32)	37,388	66–44	Angel Stadium	W1	+4
111	August 11	Rays	6–0	Santana (5–6)	Price (5–5)		43,559	67–44	Angel Stadium	W2	+5
112	August 12	Rays	10–5	Bulger (5–1)	Balfour (4–2)		37,859	68–44	Angel Stadium	W3	+5
113	August 14	@ Orioles	16–6	Tillman (1–0)	Weaver (12–4)		25,836	68–45	Oriole Park at Camden Yards	L1	+4½
114	August 15	@ Orioles	5–1	Lackey (8–5)	Matusz (1–2)	Fuentes (33)	28,770	69–45	Oriole Park at Camden Yards	W1	+4½
115	August 16	@ Orioles	17–8 (13)	Bulger (6–1)	Bass (5–3)		26,529	70–45	Oriole Park at Camden Yards	W2	+4½
116	August 17	@ Orioles	8–5	Santana (6–6)	Hernandez (4–5)	Fuentes (34)	18,460	71–45	Oriole Park at Camden Yards	W3	+4½
117	August 18	@ Indians	5–4	Bell (1–0)	Carmona (2–7)	Fuentes (35)	18,341	72–45	Progressive Field	W4	+5½
118	August 19	@ Indians	3–0	Weaver (13–4)	Sowers (4–9)		16,868	73–45	Progressive Field	W5	+6½
119	August 20	@ Indians	11–3	Masterson (4–4)	Lackey (8–6)		16,804	73–46	Progressive Field	L1	+5½
120	August 21	@ Blue Jays	5–4	Rzepczynski (2–3)	O'Sullivan (3–2)	Janssen (1)	15,993	73–47	Rogers Centre	L2	+5½
121	August 22	@ Blue Jays	7–3	Santana (7–6)	Richmond (6–7)		23,235	74–47	Rogers Centre	W1	+6½
122	August 23	@ Blue Jays	8–3	Romero (11–5)	Bell (1–1)		23,935	74–48	Rogers Centre	L1	+5½
123	August 24	Tigers	10–7	Verlander (14–7)	Weaver (13–5)	Rodney (27)	38,421	74–49	Angel Stadium	L2	+5
124	August 25	Tigers	5–3	Washburn (9–7)	Lackey (8–7)	Rodney (28)	42,970	74–50	Angel Stadium	L3	+4
125	August 26	Tigers	4–2	Saunders (10–7)	Jackson (10–6)	Fuentes (36)	36,329	75–50	Angel Stadium	W1	+5
126	August 27	Athletics	2–0	Cahill (7–12)	Santana (7–7)	Bailey (19)	43,139	75–51	Angel Stadium	L1	+4
127	August 28	Athletics	11–7	Arredondo (2–3)	Ziegler (1–4)	Fuentes (37)	41,912	76–51	Angel Stadium	W1	+5
128	August 29	Athletics	4–3	Ziegler (2–4)	Rodríguez (0–1)	Bailey (20)	43,011	76–52	Angel Stadium	L1	+4
129	August 30	Athletics	9–1	Lackey (9–7)	Anderson (7–10)		38,018	77–52	Angel Stadium	W1	+5
130	August 31	@ Mariners	10–0	Saunders (11–7)	French (4–4)		18,959	78–52	Safeco Field	W2	+6

September (16–12)

#	Date	Opponent	Score	Win	Loss	Save	Attendance	Record	Stadium	Box	GB
131	September 1	@ Mariners	2–1	Fister (2–1)	Oliver (4–1)	Aardsma (31)	18,542	78–53	Safeco Field	L1	+4½
132	September 2	@ Mariners	3–0	Hernández (14–5)	Kazmir (8–8)	Aardsma (32)	22,130	78–54	Safeco Field	L2	+3½
133	September 4	@ Royals	2–1	Weaver (14–5)	Wright (1–5)	Fuentes (38)	17,447	79–54	Kauffman Stadium	W1	+3½
134	September 5	@ Royals	2 – 1 (11)	Jepsen (5–3)	Yabuta (0–1)	Fuentes (39)	22,628	80–54	Kauffman Stadium	W2	+4½
135	September 6	@ Royals	7–2	Saunders (12–7)	Hochevar (6–9)		16,745	81–54	Kauffman Stadium	W3	+5½
136	September 7	@ Royals	6–3	Davies (7–9)	Santana (7–8)	Soria (22)	18,453	81–55	Kauffman Stadium	L1	+5
137	September 8	Mariners	3 – 2 (10)	Palmer (10–1)	Batista (6–4)		37,725	82–55	Angel Stadium	W1	+4½
138	September 9	Mariners	6–3	Weaver (15–5)	Snell (6–10)	Fuentes (40)	36,340	83–55	Angel Stadium	W2	+4½
139	September 10	Mariners	3–0	Lackey (10–7)	Rowland-Smith (3–3)		37,412	84–55	Angel Stadium	W3	+5
140	September 11	White Sox	7–1	Saunders (13–7)	Floyd (11–10)		38,375	85–55	Angel Stadium	W4	+5½
141	September 12	White Sox	4 – 3 (10)	Jenks (3–4)	Fuentes (1–4)	Peña (2)	37,390	85–56	Angel Stadium	L1	+5½
142	September 13	White Sox	3–2	Oliver (5–1)	Buehrle (12–8)	Fuentes (41)	37,512	86–56	Angel Stadium	W1	+6
143	September 14	@ Yankees	5–3	Hughes (7–3)	Weaver (15–6)	Rivera (40)	44,701	86–57	Yankee Stadium	L1	+6
144	September 15	@ Red Sox	4–1	Matsuzaka (2–5)	Lackey (10–8)		37,942	86–58	Fenway Park	L2	+6
145	September 16	@ Red Sox	9–8	Bard (2–1)	Fuentes (1–5)		37,706	86–59	Fenway Park	L3	+6
146	September 17	@ Red Sox	4–3	Jepsen (6–3)	Wagner (1–1)	Fuentes (42)	38,157	87–59	Fenway Park	W1	+6½
147	September 18	@ Rangers	2–0	Kazmir (9–8)	Hunter (8–4)	Fuentes (43)	34,240	88–59	Rangers Ballpark in Arlington	W2	+7½
148	September 19	@ Rangers	3–2	Feldman (17–5)	Weaver (15–7)	Francisco (23)	46,596	88–60	Rangers Ballpark in Arlington	L1	+6½
149	September 20	@ Rangers	10–5	Lackey (11–8)	Holland (7–12)		33,688	89–60	Rangers Ballpark in Arlington	W1	+7½
150	September 21	Yankees	5–2	Saunders (14–7)	Pettitte (13–7)	Fuentes (44)	38,667	90–60	Angel Stadium	W2	+7½
151	September 22	Yankees	6–5	Hughes (8–3)	Palmer (10–2)	Rivera (41)	40,374	90–61	Angel Stadium	L1	+7½
152	September 23	Yankees	3–2	Burnett (12–9)	Kazmir (9–9)	Rivera (42)	35,760	90–62	Angel Stadium	L2	+6½
153	September 25	Athletics	3–0	Gonzalez (6–6)	Weaver (15–8)	Bailey (26)	43,242	90–63	Angel Stadium	L3	+6
154	September 26	Athletics	15–10	Breslow (8–7)	Jepsen (6–4)		41,014	90–64	Angel Stadium	L4	+5
155	September 27	Athletics	7–4	Saunders (15–7)	González (0–4)	Fuentes (45)	38,718	91–64	Angel Stadium	W1	+6
156	September 28	Rangers	11–0	Santana (8–8)	Hunter (9–5)		40,484	92–64	Angel Stadium	W2	+7
157	September 29	Rangers	5–2	O'Sullivan (4–2)	Feldman (17–7)	Fuentes (46)	38,600	93–64	Angel Stadium	W3	+8
158	September 30	Rangers	5–0	Palmer (11–2)	Holland (8–13)		40,616	94–64	Angel Stadium	W4	+9

October (3–1)

#	Date	Opponent	Score	Win	Loss	Save	Attendance	Record	Stadium	Box	GB
159	October 1	Rangers	11–3	Millwood (13–10)	Bell (1–2)		38,552	94–65	Angel Stadium	L1	+8
160	October 2	@ Athletics	5–2	Weaver (16–8)	Gonzalez (6–7)	Fuentes (47)	14,554	95–65	Oakland-Alameda Coliseum	W1	+8
161	October 3	@ Athletics	4–2	Kazmir (10–9)	Eveland (2–4)	Fuentes (48)	16,539	96–65	Oakland-Alameda Coliseum	W2	+9
162	October 4	@ Athletics	5–3	Saunders (16–7)	Gray (0–1)	Jepsen (1)	16,591	97–65	Oakland-Alameda Coliseum	W3	+10

Legend
Angels win	Angels loss	All-Star Game	Game postponed	Clinched

"GB" legend
1st (AL West)	Not in playoff berth	1st (AL Wild Card)	Tied for 1st (AL West)

== Postseason ==
With their win on Monday, September 28, 2009, the Angels clinched their third straight American League West championship. Also, at that time, the Angels clinched the second-best record in the American League giving them home field advantage for the American League Division Series. Also, with their win on Tuesday, September 29, 2009, the Angels knocked the Rangers out of contention for the American League Wild Card, therefore, the Angels faced the Boston Red Sox in the Division Series for the third year in a row.

=== American League Division Series ===
The 2009 American League Division Series featured the AL West champion Los Angeles Angels of Anaheim and the Wildcard winner Boston Red Sox. The series began on October 8, 2009, with the Angels winning the first two games at Angel Stadium. On October 11, the series continued to Fenway Park where the Angels had a stunning come-from-behind victory to win 7–6 and sweep the Red Sox. This series marks the first time the Angels have beaten the Red Sox in a postseason series as well as the first postseason sweep for the Angels in franchise history.

=== American League Championship Series ===
The 2009 American League Championship Series featured the AL West champion Los Angeles Angels of Anaheim and the AL East champion New York Yankees. The Yankees won the series 4 games to 2.

=== Game log ===
2009 postseason game log
American League Division Series (3–0)

#	Date	Opponent	Score	Win	Loss	Save	Attendance	Series	Stadium	Box
1	October 8	Red Sox	5–0	Lackey (1–0)	Lester (0–1)		45,070	1–0	Angel Stadium	W1
2	October 9	Red Sox	4–1	Weaver (1–0)	Beckett (0–1)	Fuentes (1)	45,223	2–0	Angel Stadium	W2
3	October 11	@ Red Sox	7–6	Oliver (1–0)	Papelbon (0–1)	Fuentes (2)	38,704	3–0	Fenway Park	W3

American League Championship Series (2–4)

#	Date	Opponent	Score	Win	Loss	Save	Attendance	Series	Stadium	Box
1	October 16	@ Yankees	4–1	Sabathia (2–0)	Lackey (1–1)	Rivera (2)	49,688	0–1	Yankee Stadium	L1
2	October 17	@ Yankees	4–3 (13)	Robertson (1–0)	Santana (0–1)		49,922	0–2	Yankee Stadium	L2
3	October 19	Yankees	5–4 (11)	Santana (1–1)	Aceves (0–1)		44,911	1–2	Angel Stadium	W1
4	October 20	Yankees	10–1	Sabathia (3–0)	Kazmir (0–1)		45,160	1–3	Angel Stadium	L1
5	October 22	Yankees	7–6	Jepsen (1–0)	Hughes (0–1)	Fuentes (3)	45,113	2–3	Angel Stadium	W1
	October 24	@ Yankees	Postponed (rain); rescheduled for October 25					2–3	Yankee Stadium	
6	October 25	@ Yankees	5–2	Pettitte (2–0)	Saunders (0–1)	Rivera (3)	50,173	2–4	Yankee Stadium	L1

Legend
Angels win	Angels loss	Game postponed

== Player stats ==
=== Batting ===
Note: G = Games played; AB = At bats; R = Runs scored; H = Hits; 2B = Doubles; 3B = Triples; HR = Home runs; RBI = Runs batted in; BB = Walks; AVG = Batting average; SB = Stolen bases

Player	POS	G	AB	R	H	2B	3B	HR	RBI	BB	AVG	SB
Chone Figgins	3B	158	615	114	183	30	7	5	54	101	.298	42
Kendrys Morales	1B	152	566	86	173	43	2	34	108	46	.306	3
Bobby Abreu	OF	152	563	96	165	29	3	15	103	94	.293	30
Juan Rivera	OF	138	529	72	152	24	1	25	88	36	.287	0
Erick Aybar	SS	137	504	70	157	23	9	5	58	30	.312	14
Torii Hunter	OF	119	451	74	135	26	1	22	90	47	.299	18
Maicer Izturis	2B	114	387	74	116	22	3	8	65	35	.300	13
Vladimir Guerrero	DH	100	383	59	113	16	1	15	50	19	.295	2
Mike Napoli	C	114	382	60	104	22	1	20	56	40	.272	3
Howie Kendrick	2B	105	374	61	109	21	3	10	61	20	.291	11
Gary Matthews, Jr.	OF	103	316	44	79	19	2	4	50	40	.250	4
Jeff Mathis	C	84	237	26	50	8	0	5	28	22	.211	2
Robb Quinlan	UT	54	115	13	28	5	0	2	14	5	.243	1
Reggie Willits	LF	49	80	16	17	2	0	0	6	5	.213	5
Brandon Wood	IF	18	41	5	8	1	0	1	3	3	.195	0
Sean Rodriguez	UT	12	25	4	5	0	0	2	4	3	.200	0
Freddy Sandoval	IF	5	11	1	2	1	0	0	0	0	.182	0
Terry Evans	OF	11	7	2	2	0	0	0	1	0	.286	0
Chris Pettit	OF	10	7	2	2	0	0	0	0	0	.286	0
Bobby Wilson	UT	12	5	0	1	1	0	0	0	0	.200	0
Ryan Budde	DH	3	3	0	0	0	0	0	0	0	.000	0
John Lackey	P	3	8	1	1	0	0	0	1	0	.125	0
Matt Palmer	P	3	6	1	1	0	0	0	0	0	.167	0
Jered Weaver	P	2	4	1	0	0	0	0	1	1	.000	0
Sean O'Sullivan	P	1	3	1	1	0	0	0	0	0	.333	0
Team totals	—	162	5622	883	1604	293	33	173	841	547	.285	148

=== Pitching ===
Note: W = Wins; L = Losses; ERA = Earned run average; G = Games pitched; GS = Games started; CG = Complete games; SV = Saves; SVO = Save Opportunities; IP = Innings pitched; R = Runs allowed; ER = Earned runs allowed; BB = Walks allowed

Player	W	L	ERA	G	GS	CG	SV	SVO	IP	R	ER	BB
Jered Weaver	16	8	3.75	33	33	4	0	0	211.0	91	88	66
Joe Saunders	16	7	4.60	31	31	1	0	0	186.0	102	95	64
John Lackey	11	8	3.83	27	27	1	0	0	176.1	84	75	47
Matt Palmer	11	2	3.93	40	13	1	0	0	121.1	55	53	55
Ervin Santana	8	8	5.03	24	23	2	0	0	139.2	83	78	47
Jason Bulger	6	1	3.56	64	0	0	1	4	65.2	26	26	30
Kevin Jepsen	6	4	4.94	54	0	0	1	2	54.2	33	30	19
Darren Oliver	5	1	2.71	63	1	0	0	1	73.0	22	22	22
Justin Speier	4	2	5.18	41	0	0	0	1	40.0	23	23	15
Sean O'Sullivan	4	2	5.92	12	10	0	0	0	51.2	34	34	16
José Arredondo	2	3	6.00	43	0	0	0	1	45.0	30	30	47
Shane Loux	2	3	5.86	18	6	0	0	0	58.1	42	38	19
Scott Kazmir	2	2	1.73	6	6	0	0	0	36.1	8	7	10
Trevor Bell	1	2	9.74	8	4	0	0	0	20.1	25	22	11
Brian Fuentes	1	5	3.93	65	0	0	48	55	55.0	24	24	24
Dustin Moseley	1	0	4.30	3	3	0	0	0	14.2	8	7	3
Scot Shields	1	3	6.62	20	0	0	1	4	17.2	14	13	15
Nick Adenhart	0	0	0.00	1	1	0	0	0	6.0	0	0	3
Daniel Davidson	0	0	5.40	4	0	0	0	0	1.2	1	1	3
Kelvim Escobar	0	1	3.60	1	1	0	0	0	5.0	2	2	4
Robert Mosebach	0	0	7.71	3	0	0	0	0	2.1	3	2	3
Anthony Ortega	0	2	9.24	3	3	0	0	0	12.2	15	13	6
Fernando Rodríguez	0	0	27.00	1	0	0	0	0	0.2	3	2	2
Rafael Rodríguez	0	1	5.58	18	0	0	0	2	30.2	22	19	9
Rich Thompson	0	0	5.12	13	0	0	0	0	19.1	11	11	7
Team totals	97	65	4.45	162	162	9	51	70	1445.0	761	715	523

== Farm system ==
Level	Team	League	Manager
AAA	Salt Lake Bees	Pacific Coast League	Bobby Mitchell
AA	Arkansas Travelers	Texas League	Bobby Magallanes
A	Rancho Cucamonga Quakes	California League	Keith Johnson
A	Cedar Rapids Kernels	Midwest League	Bill Mosiello
Rookie	AZL Angels	Arizona League	Tyrone Boykin
Rookie	Orem Owlz	Pioneer League	Tom Kotchman

LEAGUE CHAMPIONS: Orem

Records
Preceded by 2008	Los Angeles Angels seasons 2009	Succeeded by 2010
