= 2009 American League Championship Series =

40th edition of Major League Baseball's American League Championship Series

Team (Wins)	Managers	Season
New York Yankees (4)	Joe Girardi	103–59 (.636), GA: 8
Los Angeles Angels of Anaheim (2)	Mike Scioscia	97–65 (.599), GA: 10
- Dates: October 16–25
- MVP: CC Sabathia (New York)
- Umpires: Tim McClelland (crew chief), Laz Diaz, Bill Miller, Jerry Layne, Fieldin Culbreth, Dale Scott

Broadcast
- Television: Fox; MLB International
- TV announcers: Joe Buck and Tim McCarver (Fox); Dave O'Brien and Rick Sutcliffe (MLB International)
- Radio: ESPN (national); WCBS-AM (Yankees); KLAA-AM (Angels)
- Radio announcers: Jon Miller and Joe Morgan (ESPN); John Sterling and Suzyn Waldman (WCBS); Terry Smith and Rory Markas (KLAA)
- ALDS: New York Yankees over Minnesota Twins (3–0); Los Angeles Angels of Anaheim over Boston Red Sox (3–0)

The 2009 American League Championship Series (ALCS) was the best-of-seven playoff series pitted the overall #1 seed New York Yankees against the second-seeded Los Angeles Angels of Anaheim for the American League pennant. The Yankees won the series, four games to two, and went on to defeat the Philadelphia Phillies 4–2 in the World Series. This was the third time that these two teams faced each other in the playoffs. They met in the 2002 ALDS and 2005 ALDS with the Angels winning both series by 3–1 and 3–2, respectively.

The Yankees held home-field advantage because they had a better regular-season record than Los Angeles Angels. The series, the 39th in league history, began on October 16 and ended on October 25. Fox Sports carried all games with Joe Buck and Tim McCarver in the broadcast booth. Starting with the 2009 season, weeknight games began 40 minutes earlier as suggested by Commissioner Bud Selig.

== Summary ==
=== New York Yankees vs. Los Angeles Angels of Anaheim ===
New York won the series, 4–2.

Game	Date	Score	Location	Time	Attendance
1	October 16	Los Angeles Angels of Anaheim – 1, New York Yankees – 4	Yankee Stadium	3:18	49,688
2	October 17	Los Angeles Angels of Anaheim – 3, New York Yankees – 4 (13)	Yankee Stadium	5:10	49,922
3	October 19	New York Yankees – 4, Los Angeles Angels of Anaheim – 5 (11)	Angel Stadium of Anaheim	4:21	44,911
4	October 20	New York Yankees – 10, Los Angeles Angels of Anaheim – 1	Angel Stadium of Anaheim	3:38	45,160
5	October 22	New York Yankees – 6, Los Angeles Angels of Anaheim – 7	Angel Stadium of Anaheim	3:34	45,113
6	October 25†	Los Angeles Angels of Anaheim – 2, New York Yankees – 5	Yankee Stadium	3:40	50,173

† Game 6 was originally scheduled to be played on Saturday, October 24, but was postponed because of rain.

== Game summaries ==
=== Game 1 ===
October 16, 2009 7:57 pm (EDT) at Yankee Stadium in Bronx, New York 45 °F (7 °C), overcast
Team	1	2	3	4	5	6	7	8	9	R	H	E
Los Angeles	0	0	0	1	0	0	0	0	0	1	4	3
New York	2	0	0	0	1	1	0	0	X	4	10	0
WP: CC Sabathia (1–0) LP: John Lackey (0–1) Sv: Mariano Rivera (1); Attendance: 49,688; Boxscore

On a blustery night where the official game time temperature was 45 °F (7 °C), starter CC Sabathia limited the Angels to one run on four hits and a walk in eight innings, striking out seven in a 4–1 Yankee win.

The Yankees staked Sabathia to a 2–0 lead in the bottom of the first on an Alex Rodriguez sacrifice fly and an unusual RBI infield single from Hideki Matsui. Matsui hit a short popup to the left side of the infield, but there was a miscommunication between third baseman Chone Figgins and shortstop Erick Aybar and the ball fell in for a single, enabling Johnny Damon to score from second. Vladimir Guerrero set up the Angels' only run in the top of the fourth, hitting a high fly ball to deep left field that looked to be a home run but bounced in front of the fence for a double instead, possibly due to the windy conditions. Guerrero scored two batters later on Kendrys Morales' single. The Yankees added a run in the fifth on Matsui's second run-scoring single of the night, and a pair of Angels errors led to New York's fourth run in the sixth. After reaching base on a walk, Melky Cabrera advanced to second on John Lackey's errant pickoff attempt. Derek Jeter then singled up the middle, but Torii Hunter overran the ball, allowing Cabrera to score without a play at the plate.

Mariano Rivera pitched the ninth, recording his 36th career postseason save.

=== Game 2 ===
October 17, 2009 7:57 pm (EDT) at Yankee Stadium in Bronx, New York 48 °F (9 °C), chance of rain
Team	1	2	3	4	5	6	7	8	9	10	11	12	13	R	H	E
Los Angeles	0	0	0	0	2	0	0	0	0	0	1	0	0	3	8	2
New York	0	1	1	0	0	0	0	0	0	0	1	0	1	4	13	3
WP: David Robertson (1–0) LP: Ervin Santana (0–1); Home runs: LAA: None; NYY: Derek Jeter (1), Alex Rodriguez (1); Attendance: 49,922; Boxscore

Once again, the Yankees struck first in the second inning. After Nick Swisher worked a two-out walk—his first in this postseason—Robinson Canó hit his first career postseason triple to deep right-center field to score Swisher. In the bottom of the third, Derek Jeter hit a solo home run to right field to give the Yankees a 2–0 advantage. The Angels fought back in the fifth. After Maicer Izturis hit a leadoff ground rule double to right field, Erick Aybar's one-out single brought Izturis home to cut the lead in half. Later in the inning, New York starter A. J. Burnett's bases-loaded wild pitch caused the game to be tied at two. Both teams threatened multiple times in the ensuing innings, but neither scored and the game was sent to extra innings. In the top half of the 11th, Gary Matthews Jr. drew a walk off Yankees reliever Alfredo Aceves, advanced to second on a sacrifice bunt by Erick Aybar, and scored on an RBI single by Chone Figgins. At this point, the weather took a turn for the worse, which included rain and snow falling, but the Yankees battled back. In the bottom half of the frame, Alex Rodriguez tied the game with a leadoff home run off Angels closer Brian Fuentes. Then, the Yankees won the game in the bottom of the 13th inning. Jerry Hairston Jr. led off with a single and advanced to second on a groundout. Angels reliever Ervin Santana then intentionally walked Robinson Cano to set up a force play. Then, Melky Cabrera hit a ground ball to second. Maicer Izturis had the option of throwing to first for the second out and leaving runners on second and third, but instead attempted a tough throw to force Cano out at second and get a potential double play. However, Izturis's throw completely missed shortstop Aybar and went towards third base. Figgins, who was backing up the play, came up with the ball in an attempt to throw out Hairston at home, but the ball slipped out of his hand and Hairston scored the game-winning run.

Alex Rodriguez's 11th-inning home run was his second late-inning game-tying home run in this postseason. Both were off the opposing team's closer (the Minnesota Twins' Joe Nathan, in ALDS Game 2).

=== Game 3 ===
October 19, 2009 1:13 pm (PDT) at Angel Stadium of Anaheim in Anaheim, California 68 °F (20 °C), partly cloudy
Team	1	2	3	4	5	6	7	8	9	10	11	R	H	E
New York	1	0	0	1	1	0	0	1	0	0	0	4	8	0
Los Angeles	0	0	0	0	1	2	1	0	0	0	1	5	13	0
WP: Ervin Santana (1–1) LP: Alfredo Aceves (0–1); Home runs: NYY: Derek Jeter (2), Alex Rodriguez (2), Johnny Damon (1), Jorge Posada (1); LAA: Howie Kendrick (1), Vladimir Guerrero (1); Attendance: 44,911; Boxscore

For the third game in a row the Yankees scored first, this time on Derek Jeter's leadoff home run off Angels starter Jered Weaver. They extended their lead on solo home runs by Alex Rodriguez in the fourth inning and Johnny Damon in the fifth, both off Weaver. Yankees starter Andy Pettitte held the Angels scoreless until the fifth inning, when he yielded a solo home run to Howie Kendrick in the fifth. The next inning, Vladimir Guerrero hit a two-run home run, also off Pettitte, to tie the game. The Angels took the lead in the seventh, thanks to Kendrick's one-out triple and Maicer Izturis' sacrifice fly, both off Joba Chamberlain. However, a Jorge Posada solo home run off Kevin Jepsen—the sixth in the game—tied it again in the eighth.

Another Angels' gaffe proved costly. In the eighth inning Abreu led off with a double but attempted to stretch it into a triple. An alert Jeter called for the ball at second and tossed to Mark Teixeira who was covering second, since Robinson Canó was in the outfield, to tag Abreu for the out.

For the second consecutive time in the series, the Yankees and Angels played extra innings. The Angels loaded the bases with one out in the tenth inning against Mariano Rivera, but were unable to score. In the bottom of the 11th inning, Yankees pitcher David Robertson retired the two Angels batters he faced and was one out away from forcing a 12th inning when manager Joe Girardi replaced him with Alfredo Aceves, a decision that would later be criticized by the New York media. Aceves, who yielded a go-ahead run to the Angels in the 11th inning of Game 2 that was later erased by Rodriguez' home run, yielded a single to Kendrick on a 3–1 count. Jeff Mathis, the Angels' backup catcher who was inserted into the game in the eighth inning, followed with a double to deep left field, scoring Kendrick from first and winning the game in a walk-off.

=== Game 4 ===
October 20, 2009 4:57 pm (PDT) at Angel Stadium of Anaheim in Anaheim, California 68 °F (20 °C), clear
Team	1	2	3	4	5	6	7	8	9	R	H	E
New York	0	0	0	3	2	0	0	2	3	10	13	0
Los Angeles	0	0	0	0	1	0	0	0	0	1	5	1
WP: CC Sabathia (2–0) LP: Scott Kazmir (0–1); Home runs: NYY: Alex Rodriguez (3), Johnny Damon (2); LAA: Kendrys Morales (1); Attendance: 45,160; Boxscore

Yankees ace CC Sabathia started Game 4 on three days' rest, which proved to be no problem, as he pitched eight strong innings, allowing only one earned run on a home run by Kendrys Morales in the fifth, five hits, and two walks, while striking out five. For the fourth straight game in the series the Yankees scored first. With runners on second and third and one out, Robinson Cano hit into a fielder's choice to score Alex Rodriguez. After a walk loaded the bases, Melky Cabrera's two-run single made it 3–0 Yankees. Next inning, Mark Teixeira hit a leadoff single and Angels' starter Scott Kazmir was relieved by Jason Bulger, who allowed a two-run home run to Rodriguez, tying a postseason record set by Lou Gehrig and Ryan Howard for recording an RBI in eight consecutive games. In the eighth, Cabrera walked off of Ervin Santana who was relieved by Matt Palmer. Johnny Damon's home run made it 7–1 Yankees. Rodriguez doubled to lead off the ninth and scored on Jorge Posada's sacrifice fly. One out later, Robinson Cano walked and Brett Gardner singled before both scored on a double by Cabrera, giving him four RBIs. Chad Gaudin relieved Sabathia in the bottom of the ninth and retired the Angels in order as the Yankees were one win away from their first World Series since 2003. The game included three controversial calls by the umpiring crew that third base umpire and crew chief Tim McClelland—who made two of the three calls in question—admitted were in error, drawing more attention to the argument for instant replay in baseball.

=== Game 5 ===
October 22, 2009 4:57 pm (PDT) at Angel Stadium of Anaheim in Anaheim, California 66 °F (19 °C), partly cloudy
Team	1	2	3	4	5	6	7	8	9	R	H	E
New York	0	0	0	0	0	0	6	0	0	6	9	0
Los Angeles	4	0	0	0	0	0	3	0	X	7	12	0
WP: Kevin Jepsen (1–0) LP: Phil Hughes (0–1) Sv: Brian Fuentes (1); Attendance: 45,113; Boxscore

Unlike the previous four games, this time the Angels scored first. With Chone Figgins on third base and Bobby Abreu on first, Torii Hunter singled to center field, scoring both Figgins and Abreu. Hunter then scored on an RBI double by Vladimir Guerrero, followed by a Kendrys Morales RBI single that scored Guerrero from second. All this was done before the first out was recorded. From that point on, neither starter—John Lackey for the Angels and A. J. Burnett for the Yankees—allowed a run until the seventh inning. In the top half of that inning, Lackey worked into a bases-loaded jam with two outs when manager Mike Scioscia replaced him with Darren Oliver. Mark Teixeira connected with Oliver's first pitch for a double that scored all three inherited runners—Melky Cabrera, Jorge Posada, and Derek Jeter. After an intentional walk to Alex Rodriguez, Hideki Matsui singled, scoring Teixeira and tying the game. Oliver was replaced with Kevin Jepsen, who yielded a triple to Robinson Canó that scored Rodriguez and Matsui, giving the Yankees a two-run lead. In the bottom half of the seventh, Abreu hit an RBI groundout that scored Jeff Mathis from third. Hunter then drew a walk, followed by a Guerrero single that scored Erick Aybar, and a Morales single that scored Hunter, giving the Angels a one-run lead. The Yankees threatened Angels closer Brian Fuentes in the ninth inning. With two outs, Fuentes loaded the bases, but Nick Swisher popped out to end the game.

As of today, this remains the Angels last post-season victory.

=== Game 6 ===
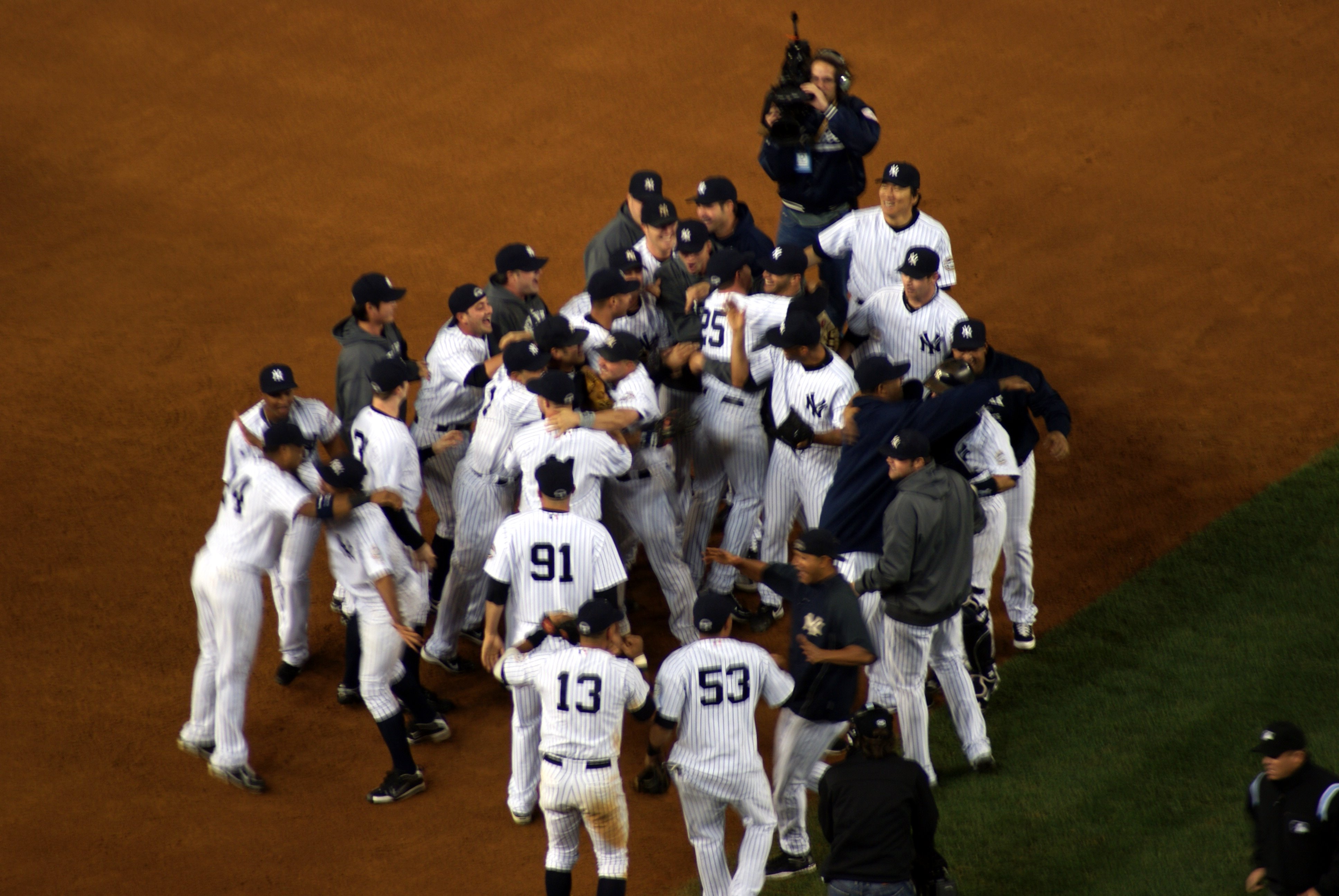
New York Yankees celebrate after their 5–2 win against the Los Angeles Angels of Anaheim.

October 25, 2009 8:20 pm (EDT) at Yankee Stadium in Bronx, New York 59 °F (15 °C), mostly cloudy
Team	1	2	3	4	5	6	7	8	9	R	H	E
Los Angeles	0	0	1	0	0	0	0	1	0	2	9	2
New York	0	0	0	3	0	0	0	2	X	5	9	0
WP: Andy Pettitte (1–0) LP: Joe Saunders (0–1) Sv: Mariano Rivera (2); Attendance: 50,173; Boxscore

Game 6 was originally scheduled to be played on Saturday, October 24, but was postponed because of rain. Angels gaffes once again proved costly. In the top of the second, baserunner Vladimir Guerrero ran too far from first base on a fly ball out and was doubled off. The game remained scoreless until the top of the third inning when Bobby Abreu singled home Jeff Mathis, who singled to lead off and moved to second on a groundout, to give the Angels the early lead. The Yankees left six men on base in the first and second innings before they finally broke through in the bottom of the fourth after Johnny Damon lined a two-run single with the bases loaded off of Joe Saunders to give them the lead for the remainder of the game. A single reloaded the bases before Alex Rodriguez walked to force in another run. Saunders was then removed in favor of Darren Oliver, who pitched 2 2/3 shutout innings.

Andy Pettitte pitched a strong game, allowing one run in 6 1/3 innings while striking out six. Mariano Rivera entered the game in the eighth inning for a six-out save. Chone Figgins hit a leadoff single in the eighth, moved to second on a groundout and scored on a Guerrero single with two outs to close the gap to 3–2. In the bottom of the eighth, Robinson Cano drew a leadoff walk off of Ervin Santana, who was relieved by Scott Kazmir. The Angels misfielded two sacrifice bunts by the Yankees, a fielding error by Howie Kendrick and a throwing error by pitcher Scott Kazmir, allowing a run to score. A walk loaded the bases before Mark Teixeira's sacrifice fly made it 5–2 Yankees. Rivera retired the side in the ninth to record the Yankees' 40th American League pennant.

=== Composite box ===
2009 ALCS (4–2): New York Yankees over Los Angeles Angels of Anaheim

Team	1	2	3	4	5	6	7	8	9	10	11	12	13	R	H	E
Los Angeles Angels of Anaheim	4	0	1	1	4	2	4	1	0	0	2	0	0	19	51	8
New York Yankees	3	1	1	7	4	1	6	5	3	0	1	0	1	33	62	3
Total attendance: 284,967 Average attendance: 47,495

== Aftermath ==
A week and a half later, the Yankees would defeat the Philadelphia Phillies in the World Series in six games. It was the fifth and final ring for the Core Four era Yankees (fourth for Posada who was left off the playoff roster in 1996) and the only one for star players such as Alex Rodriguez, CC Sabathia, and Hideki Matsui, the latter of which who won the World Series MVP. It was the team's 27th World Series and their last to date; the Yankees have been to the ALCS six times since (2010, 2012, 2017, 2019, 2022, 2024), losing on each occasion until 2024.

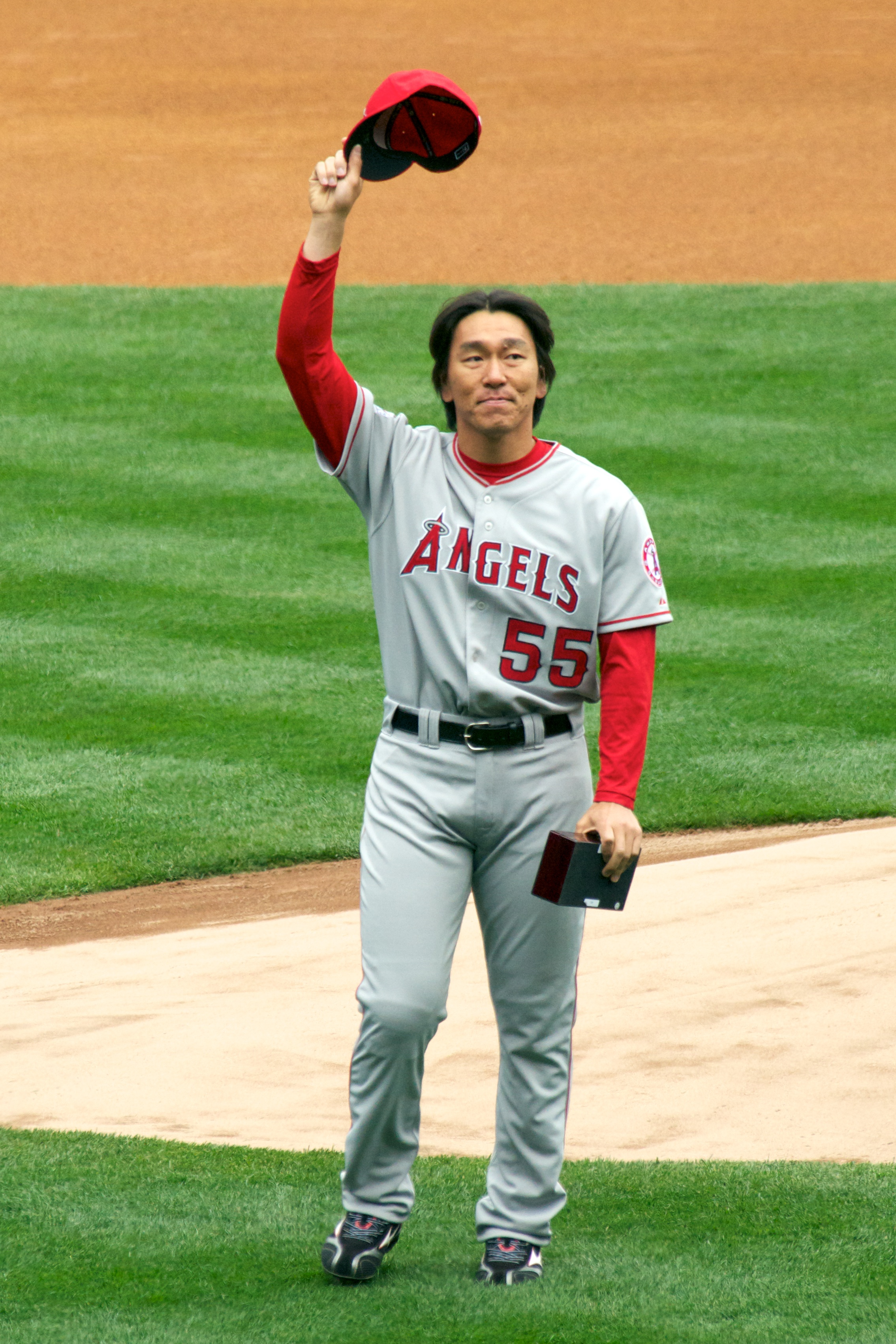
Hideki Matsui tips his hat during his first game back at Yankee Stadium

In regards to Matsui, on December 16, 2009, the 2009 World Series MVP agreed to a one-year deal with the Los Angeles Angels of Anaheim worth $6.5 million. Matsui told Yomiuri Shimbun that he "loved the Yankees the best" but that he no longer felt valued and when his agent called to negotiate, "The Yankees had nothing prepared [in terms of contract conditions]." He made up his mind to sign with the Angels quickly. "I really felt their high expectations of me," he said. On April 13, 2010, Matsui returned to Yankee Stadium as a member of the Angels and received his championship ring and a long standing ovation.

The 2009 American League Championship Series marked the end of the most successful era in Angels franchise history. From 2002 to 2009, they made six postseason appearances, which was highlighted by the by team winning the 2002 American League pennant and World Series. Before 2002, they had been to the postseason just three times in franchise history (1979, 1982, and 1986), never winning a postseason series. Since 2009, the Angels have made the postseason just once (in 2014) and have not won a postseason game since Game 5 of the 2009 ALCS.
