= Mosebach =

Mosebach is a surname. Notable people with the surname include:

- Bobby Mosebach (born 1984), American baseball player
- Karsten Mosebach (born 1969), German photographer and teacher
- Martin Mosebach (born 1951), German writer
