= Anthony Ortega =

Anthony or Tony Ortega may refer to:

- Anthony Ortega (baseball) (born 1985), Venezuelan baseball pitcher
- Anthony Ortega (musician) (1928–2022), American jazz musician
- Tony Ortega (born 1963), American journalist and blogger
