= Williamsport High School =

Location
- 5 South Clifton Drive; Williamsport, Maryland 21795; United States; 39°35′47″N 77°48′36.7″W

Information
- Type: Public
- Established: 1970
- School district: Washington County Public Schools
- NCES District ID: 2400660
- NCES School ID: 240066001295
- Principal: Scott Noll
- Grades: 9–12
- Enrollment: 920
- Colors: Royal blue and White
- Mascot: Wildcat
- Website: whs.wcpsmd.com

Williamsport High School is a public high school in Williamsport, Washington County, Maryland, United States.

== Baseball team ==
The school's baseball team, and its coach David Warrenfeltz, were the subject of a 2012 Sports Illustrated article. In a story written by Chris Ballard, Warrenfeltz discussed events affecting the team in early 2012 when the team's star pitcher and his prom date were killed in an automobile crash. Despite the loss, the team rallied to win the Maryland state high school championship. Warrenfeltz was also a close friend and teammate of former Los Angeles Angels pitcher Nick Adenhart, who was killed in an automobile crash in 2009. Both Warrenfeltz and Adenhart graduated from Williamsport High School.

== Notable alumni ==
- Nick Adenhart, late Los Angeles Angels of Anaheim starting pitcher
- Gina Marie Groh, United States District Court Judge
- Dave Cole, former Major League Baseball pitcher
