= Shane Loux =

American baseball player & coach (born 1979)

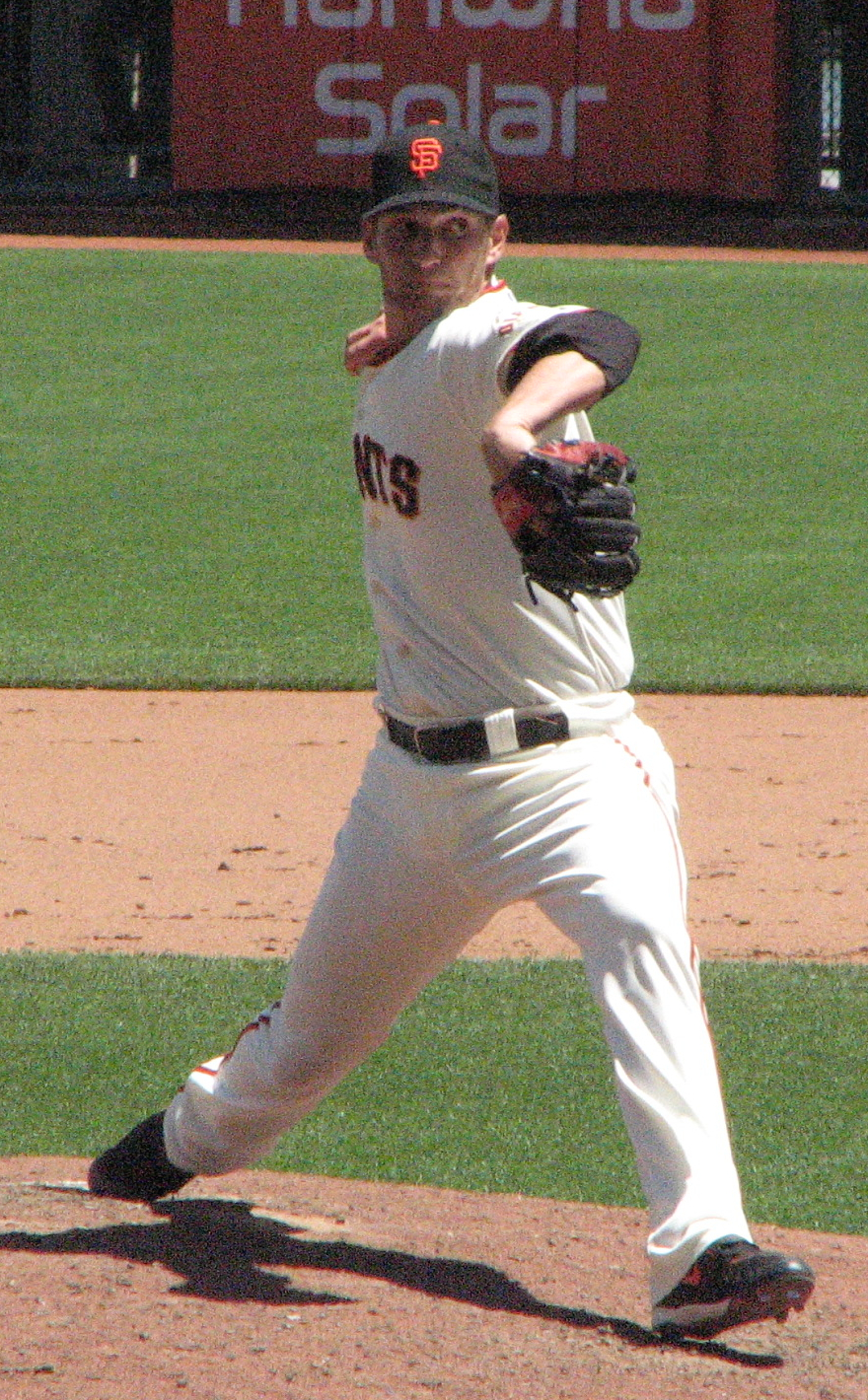
- Loux with the San Francisco Giants
- Pitcher / Coach
- Born: August 31, 1979 (age 47); Rapid City, South Dakota, U.S.
- Batted: Right Threw: Right

MLB debut
- September 10, 2002, for the Detroit Tigers

Last MLB appearance
- September 30, 2012, for the San Francisco Giants

MLB statistics
- Win–loss record: 4–7
- Earned run average: 5.94
- Strikeouts: 47
- Stats at Baseball Reference

Teams
- Detroit Tigers (2002–2003); Los Angeles Angels of Anaheim (2008–2009); San Francisco Giants (2012)

Shane Alan Loux (born August 31, 1979) is an American former professional baseball pitcher and current coach. He played in Major League Baseball (MLB) for the Detroit Tigers, Los Angeles Angels of Anaheim and San Francisco Giants. He is currently the pitching coach of the Salt Lake Bees in the Angels organization.

== Playing career ==
=== High school ===
Loux pitched for Highland High School in Gilbert, Arizona, where he was named to the 1997 ABCA/Rawlings All-American Team. He was selected by the Detroit Tigers with the first pick of the second round (53rd overall) in the 1997 MLB draft, and signed for $390,000, forgoing a scholarship to play for Arizona State University.

=== Detroit Tigers ===
He made his professional debut shortly after the draft at only 17 years of age for the Gulf Coast League Tigers. He made nine starts in 10 appearances, posting a 4–1 record with an 0.84 ERA in 43 innings. Loux progressed through the Tigers farm system and was named one of the organization's top 10 prospects each year from 1999 to 2001.

Loux made his MLB debut on September 10, 2002 as the Tigers starting pitcher against Minnesota Twins. He took the loss, allowing five earned runs in four innings, giving up a home run to all-star center fielder Torii Hunter, but did record his first MLB strikeout against future Hall of Famer and 500 Home Run Club member David Ortiz. Loux earned his first big league win on September 24, 2003, a 4-3 Tigers victory over the Kansas City Royals, one of only 43 for the ballclub, which would finish with an MLB record 119 losses and is generally regarded as the worst team of all-time.

He struggled in parts of two major league seasons with Detroit, pitching to a 7.71 ERA in 44.1 innings, walking as many batters as he struck out. After spending the 2004 season with AAA Toledo, Loux underwent Tommy John surgery, performed by Dr. Lewis Yocum, to repair a torn UCL. He was granted free agency after eight years with the organization and missed the 2005 season while rehabbing.

=== Kansas City Royals ===
Loux returned to professional baseball, signing a Minor League deal with the Kansas City Royals. He pitched out of the bullpen the whole year, posting a 2–5 record with a 6.46 ERA in 31 games.

=== Los Angeles Angels of Anaheim ===
Loux made his return to the big leagues with the Los Angeles Angels of Anaheim following a 12–6 record in Triple-A and being named Pacific Coast League Pitcher of the Year. In his first game back, he went two innings, not allowing a hit, but walking one batter.

In 2009, he appeared in 18 games, 6 starts for the Angels. He posted a record of 2–3 in 58.1 innings.

In October 2009, Loux was once again granted free agency.

=== Houston Astros ===
Loux signed a minor league deal with the Houston Astros.

He posted a 6–12 record in 20 games.

=== San Francisco Giants ===
Loux signed a Minor League deal with the San Francisco Giants.

Loux pitched for the Triple A Fresno Grizzlies in 2011, posting an 8–12 record. Loux pitched a career high and league leading 179.1 innings with a SO/BB of 2.05 in 28 starts. On October 31, 2011, the Giants re-signed Loux.

In 2012, after posting a 1.41 ERA in 23 games in Triple A, Loux was called up by the Giants. In 25.1 innings, Loux had a 4.97 ERA for the Giants. He would land on the DL on June 29 with a neck strain.

In 2013, after posting a 4.09 ERA in 9 games for the Triple A Fresno Grizzlies, Loux announced via Twitter on July 11, 2013 that he would undergo season-ending Tommy John surgery. His surgery was scheduled for July 12, 2013.

=== Sugar Land Skeeters ===
Loux signed an Atlantic League deal with the Sugar Land Skeeters.

In 2015, after a successful rehabilitation from his second Tommy John surgery during the 2014 season, Loux signed to pitch for the Skeeters. After a very successful half season with Sugarland, he announced his retirement from baseball on July 10, 2015. In 13 starts 77 innings he went 4-3 with a 2.92 ERA with 25 strikeouts.

== Coaching career ==
=== Arizona Diamondbacks ===
In 2017, Loux became a minor league pitching coach in the Arizona Diamondbacks organization, coaching for the Missoula Osprey. Loux was named pitching coach of the Visalia Rawhide of the Diamondbacks organization in 2019. Loux was pitching coach for the Hillsboro Hops in 2021. He was the pitching coach for the Amarillo Sod Poodles in 2022. In 2023, he was named the Assistant Minor League Pitching Coordinator.

=== Los Angeles Angels ===
On February 16, 2024, Loux was named pitching coach of the Salt Lake Bees, Los Angeles Angels' Triple-A affiliate.

== Scouting report ==
Loux was a sinkerballer (low to mid 90s), using the pitch more than half the time. His main secondary pitch was a cutter (mid 80s) along with a curveball and a changeup.

== Personal ==
Loux is married and has two children. He currently resides in Sylvania, Ohio.
