= Karsten Mosebach =

German photographer and teacher (born 1969)

- Born: 1969 (age 56–57); Homberg (Efze), Germany
- Education: University of Münster
- Occupations: Photographer and teacher
- Website: karstenmosebach.de

Karsten Mosebach (born 1969) is a German photographer and teacher.

== Life ==
Mosebach was born in Homberg (Efze). After graduating from high school, he studied chemistry and geography at the University of Münster to become a teacher. After the end of his studies and his legal clerkship, he worked for Tecklenborg Verlag for one year as an editor for the magazine NaturFoto.

Since then he has been working as a chemistry and geography teacher at the Gymnasium Melle. He runs the student company Foto AG in the grammar school, which photographs several times in parliaments (European Parliament, Bundestag) members of parliament for Wikipedia, which is also often used outside of Wikipedia.

Mosebach works regularly for two different photo magazines and is active as a landscape and animal photographer. Together with other authors and photographers, Mosebach has published 10 books to date and works as a speaker.

The filmmakers Svenja Schieke and Ralph Schieke accompanied Mosebach for a total of 15 months as part of a NDR documentary NaturNah Der Eulenmann. In addition to being broadcast on NDR, the documentary has since been shown at film festivals.

== Awards and honors ==
- Nature Photographer of the Year 2011 of the Society of German Animal Photographers
- Nature Photographer of the Year 2016: 1st place in the category Landscapes
- Fritz-Pölking Prize (2017)
- Photo competition 2018 of the Swiss Ornithological Institute
- Nature Photographer of the Year 2020: 2nd place in the category Birds

== Bibliography ==
- Zupanc, Daniel; Mosebach, Karsten (2000). Australien: Land der Farben [Australia: Land of colours] (in German). Steinfurt: Tecklenborg. ISBN 978-3-924044-52-7.
- Mosebach, Karsten; Möllers, Florian (2002). Auf stillen Pfaden: Streifzüge durch den Geo.Naturpark im Osnabrücker Land, Teutoburger Wald und Wiehengebirge [On quiet paths: Forays through the Geo.nature park in the Osnabrücker Land, Teutoburg Forest and Wiehengebirge] (in German). Belm: Meinders und Elstermann. ISBN 978-3-88926-889-1.
- Mosebach, Karsten; Beckwermert, Matthias (2005). Bad Rothenfelde: Waldduft und Salzluft [Bad Rothenfelde: Forest scent and salt air] (in German). Bad Rothenfelde: Ed. Bücher-Beckwermert. ISBN 978-3-00-016444-6.
- Mosebach, Karsten; Volmer, Bernhard; Grove, Thomas (2009). Bad Iburg: kleine Stadt mit großer Geschichte [Bad Iburg: small town with a great history] (in German). Belm: Meinders & Elstermann. ISBN 978-3-88926-910-2.
- Mosebach, Karsten; Mittelstädt, Fritz-Gerd (2013). Landkreis Osnabrück (ed.). Schlösser & Burgen im Osnabrücker Land : ausgewählte Monographien in Texten und Bildern [Schlösser & Burgen im Osnabrücker Land : selected monographs in text and pictures] (in German). Belm: Meinders & Elstermann. ISBN 978-3-88926-030-7.
- Mosebach, Karsten; Beckwermert, Matthias (2005). Bad Rothenfelde: Waldduft und Salzluft [Bad Rothenfelde: Forest scent and salt air] (in German). Bad Rothenfelde: Ed. Bücher-Beckwermert. ISBN 978-3-00-016444-6.
- Mosebach, Karsten; Volmer, Bernhard; Grove, Thomas (2009). Bad Iburg: kleine Stadt mit großer Geschichte [Bad Iburg: small town with a great history] (in German). Belm: Meinders & Elstermann. ISBN 978-3-88926-910-2.
- Mosebach, Karsten; Mittelstädt, Fritz-Gerd (2013). Schlösser & Burgen im Osnabrücker Land : ausgewählte Monographien in Texten und Bildern [Schlösser & Burgen im Osnabrücker Land : selected monographs in text and pictures] (in German). Belm: Meinders & Elstermann. ISBN 978-3-88926-030-7.
- Mosebach, Karsten; Vollmer, Bernhard; Kluttig, Timo (2014). Teutoburger Wald: entlang des Hermannsweges [Teutoburger Wald : along the Hermannsweg] (in German). Steinfurt: Tecklenborg. ISBN 978-3-944327-14-3.
- Mosebach, Karsten (2015). Landkreis Osnabrück (ed.). Kirchen & Kirchenburgen im Osnabrücker Land : ausgewählte Monographien in Texten und Bildern [Kirchen & Kirchenburgen im Osnabrücker Land : selected monographs in texts and pictures] (in German). Belm: Meinders & Elstermann. ISBN 978-3-88926-031-4.
- Mosebach, Karsten; Nägele, Kurt; Musharbash, Nazih (2015). Jordanien: der ganze Orient in einem Land [Jordan: the whole Orient in one country] (in German). Steinfurt: Tecklenborg. ISBN 978-3-944327-29-7.
- Mosebach, Karsten (2017). Gute Fotos, harte Arbeit: Wege zum perfekten Naturfoto [Good photos, hard work: ways to the perfect nature photo] (in German). Münster: fotoforum-Verlag. ISBN 978-3-945565-06-3.
