= Rafael Rodríguez (baseball) =

Dominican baseball player (born 1984)

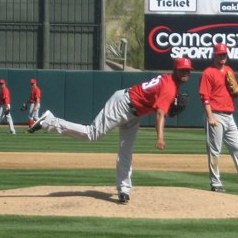
- Rodríguez with the Los Angeles Angels of Anaheim in 2010
- Pitcher
- Born: September 24, 1984 (age 41); Cotuí, Dominican Republic
- Batted: Right Threw: Right

MLB debut
- April 15, 2009, for the Los Angeles Angels of Anaheim

Last appearance
- August 11, 2010, for the Arizona Diamondbacks

MLB statistics
- Win–loss record: 0–1
- Earned run average: 5.60
- Strikeouts: 13
- Stats at Baseball Reference

Teams
- Los Angeles Angels of Anaheim (2009–2010); Arizona Diamondbacks (2010)

Rafael Rodríguez (born September 24, 1984) is a Dominican former professional baseball pitcher. He played in Major League Baseball (MLB) for the Los Angeles Angels of Anaheim and Arizona Diamondbacks.

== Career ==
=== Los Angeles Angels of Anaheim ===
On July 20, 2001, Rodríguez signed with the Los Angeles Angels of Anaheim as an international free agent. From 2002 to 2008, he played for the rookie-level Arizona League Angels, rookie-level Provo Angels, Single-A Cedar Rapids Kernels, High-A Rancho Cucamonga Quakes, Double-A Arkansas Travelers, and Triple-A Salt Lake Bees.

Rodríguez made his major league debut with the Los Angeles Angels of Anaheim against the Seattle Mariners on April 15, 2009, at Safeco Field, pitching one inning and giving up one hit. Rodríguez made 18 appearances for Los Angeles during his rookie campaign, compiling an 0–1 record and 5.58 ERA with 10 strikeouts across 30 2/3 innings pitched.

Rodríguez made one appearance for the Angels on June 14, 2010, allowing one run in two innings pitched against the Milwaukee Brewers.

=== Arizona Diamondbacks ===
On July 25, 2010, Rodríguez was traded by the Angels to the Arizona Diamondbacks as part of deal in exchange for Dan Haren. In two appearances for the Diamondbacks, he struggled to a 6.75 ERA with two strikeouts across 2 2/3 innings pitched.

On January 24, 2011, Rodríguez was designated for assignment by the Diamondbacks following the acquisition of Armando Galarraga. He cleared waivers and was sent outright to the Triple-A Reno Aces on February 7. Rodríguez made 29 appearances (one start) for Reno, but struggled to an 0–3 record and 9.88 ERA with 18 strikeouts and four saves across 37 1/3 innings pitched. He was released by the Diamondbacks organization on July 5.

=== Saraperos de Saltillo ===
On May 25, 2012, Rodríguez signed with the Saraperos de Saltillo of the Mexican League. In four appearances (three starts) for the Saraperos, he struggled to a 1–2 record and 10.64 ERA with no strikeouts over 11 innings of work. Rodríguez was released by Saltillo on June 11.
