= Daniel Davidson =

American baseball player (born 1981)

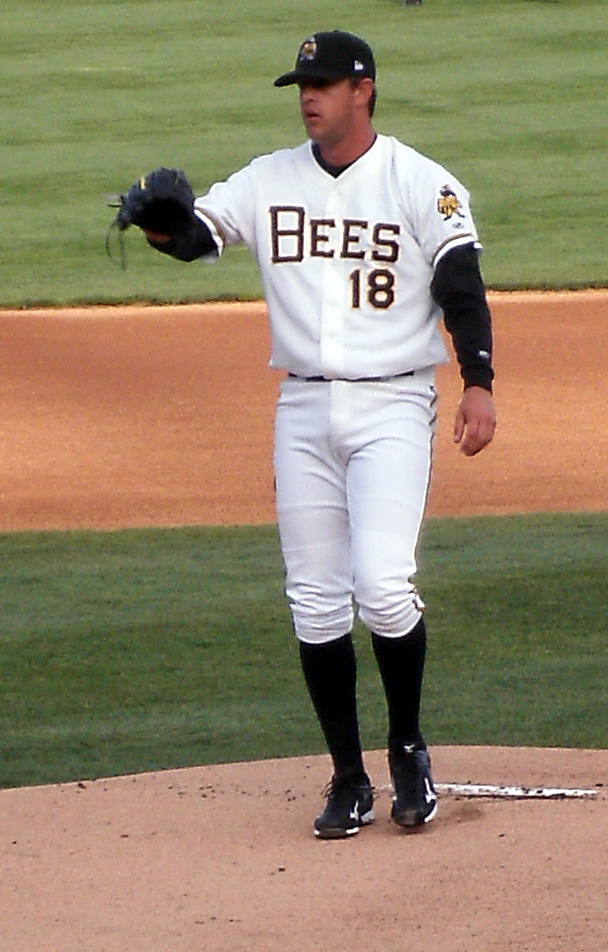
- Daniel Davidson during a 2010 Salt Lake Bees game
- Relief pitcher
- Born: January 8, 1981 (age 45); Panama City, Florida, U.S.
- Batted: Left Threw: Left

MLB debut
- April 19, 2009, for the Los Angeles Angels of Anaheim

Last MLB appearance
- April 26, 2009, for the Los Angeles Angels of Anaheim

MLB statistics
- Win–loss record: 0–0
- Earned run average: 5.40
- Strikeouts: 0
- Stats at Baseball Reference

Teams
- Los Angeles Angels of Anaheim (2009)

Daniel Gerome Davidson (born January 8, 1981) is an American former professional baseball pitcher. He previously played in Major League Baseball (MLB) for the Los Angeles Angels of Anaheim.

Davidson is 6 ft 4in tall and weighs 225 lbs.

== Career ==
Davidson was selected by the Anaheim Angels in the 13th Round (390th overall) of the 2003 Major League Baseball draft after playing college baseball for Florida State University and Gulf Coast Community College. He was previously drafted by the Seattle Mariners and Minnesota Twins in 1999 and 2000 respectively but didn't sign with either team.

Davidson made his major league debut against the Twins on April 19, 2009, at the Hubert H. Humphrey Metrodome, pitching one inning and giving up one walk. On April 26, 2009, Davidson was designated for assignment. He is now a middle school administrator in his hometown of Panama City, FL.

== Education ==
While playing college baseball, Davidson obtained a degree in Teaching as well as gaining experience in baseball coaching.
