= Brian Fuentes =

American baseball player (born 1975)

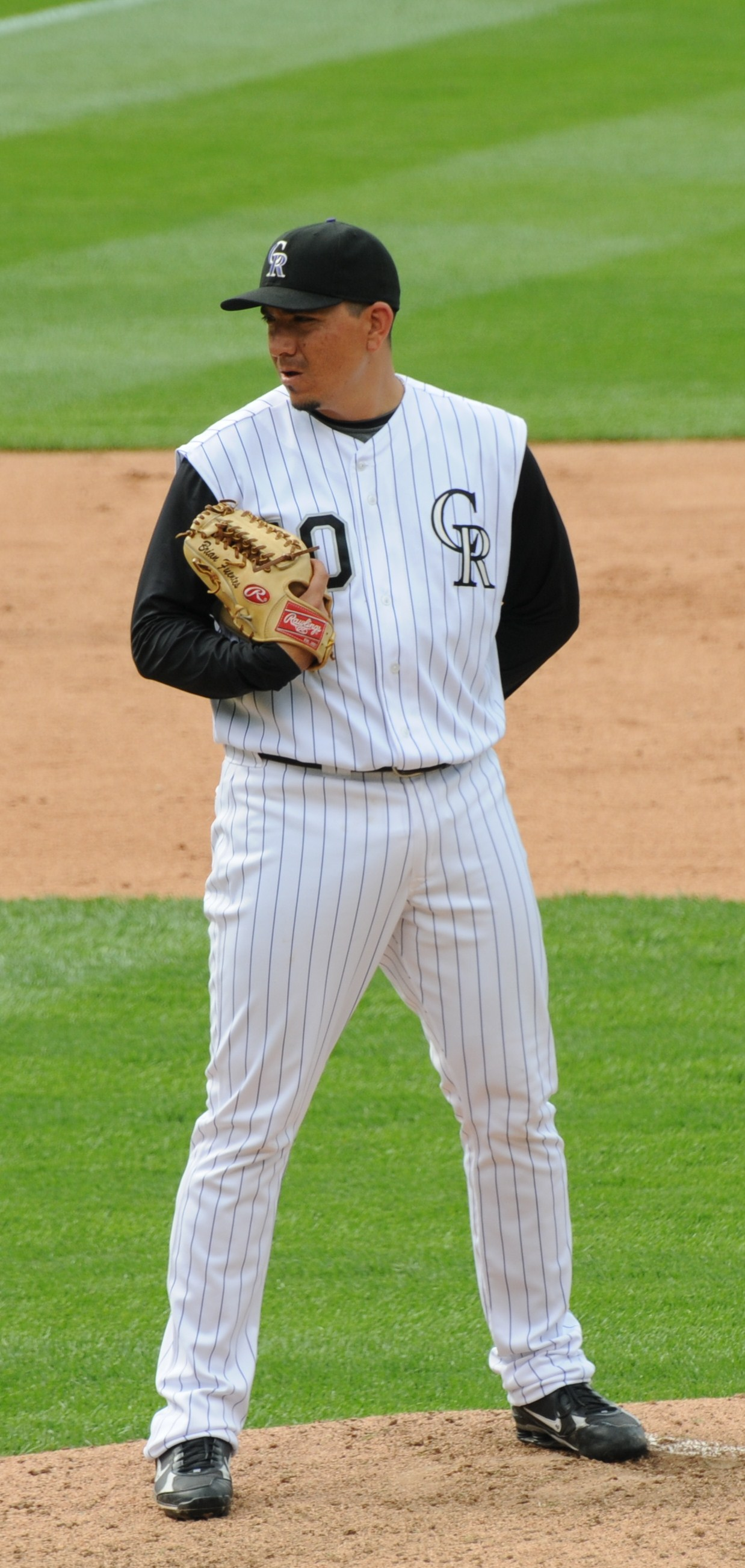
- Fuentes with the Rockies in 2008
- Pitcher
- Born: August 9, 1975 (age 51); Merced, California, U.S.
- Batted: Left Threw: Left

MLB debut
- June 2, 2001, for the Seattle Mariners

Last MLB appearance
- August 8, 2012, for the St. Louis Cardinals

MLB statistics
- Win–loss record: 26–43
- Earned run average: 3.62
- Strikeouts: 639
- Saves: 204
- Stats at Baseball Reference

Teams
- Seattle Mariners (2001); Colorado Rockies (2002–2008); Los Angeles Angels of Anaheim (2009–2010); Minnesota Twins (2010); Oakland Athletics (2011–2012); St. Louis Cardinals (2012)

Career highlights and awards
- 4× All-Star (2005–2007, 2009); AL saves leader (2009)

Brian Christopher Fuentes (/ˈfwɛntɪs/; born August 9, 1975) is an American former professional baseball pitcher in Major League Baseball (MLB). He played for the Seattle Mariners, Colorado Rockies, Los Angeles Angels of Anaheim, Minnesota Twins, Oakland Athletics and St. Louis Cardinals. He bats and throws left-handed.

== Early years ==
Fuentes was born in Merced, California and attended Merced High School. After graduating from high school, Fuentes attended Merced Community College.

== Professional career ==
=== Seattle Mariners ===
Fuentes was drafted by the Seattle Mariners in the 25th round of the 1995 MLB draft. He spent one season for the Mariners appearing in ten games.

=== Colorado Rockies ===
On December 16, 2001, Fuentes was traded to the Colorado Rockies, along with José Paniagua and Denny Stark for Jeff Cirillo. Through the first four years of his Major League career, Fuentes had a record of 8–8 with a 4.04 ERA, recording only four saves in 163 games. However, in 2005, Fuentes took over the closer role for the Rockies following the season-ending shoulder surgery of right-handed pitcher Chin-hui Tsao. Fuentes had a successful season and was named to his first career All-Star Game, but did not appear in the game. He became the first reliever and only the third pitcher overall to represent the Rockies, joining starting pitchers Mike Hampton (2001) and Shawn Chacón (2003). His 31 saves matched Dave Veres (1995) for the third highest single season total in franchise history, trailing only José Jiménez (41 in 2002) and Chacon (35 in 2004). In 2006, Fuentes earned 30 saves while posting a 3–4 record and a 3.44 ERA and was selected as an All-Star for the second time. Fuentes got his first career postseason win in Game 3 of the 2007 NLDS when the Rockies won the series against the Phillies in 3 games. The Rockies would eventually make it to the World Series for the first time in franchise history but lost to the Boston Red Sox in the 2007 World Series in just 4 games.

In June 2007, after blowing four saves within an eight-day period, Fuentes was demoted from his role as Rockies closer, losing the job to Manny Corpas. Despite his struggles, he was named an NL All-Star later that week for the third straight year.

In April 2008, Fuentes regained his closer role, after Corpas had blown a number of save opportunities.

=== Los Angeles Angels of Anaheim ===
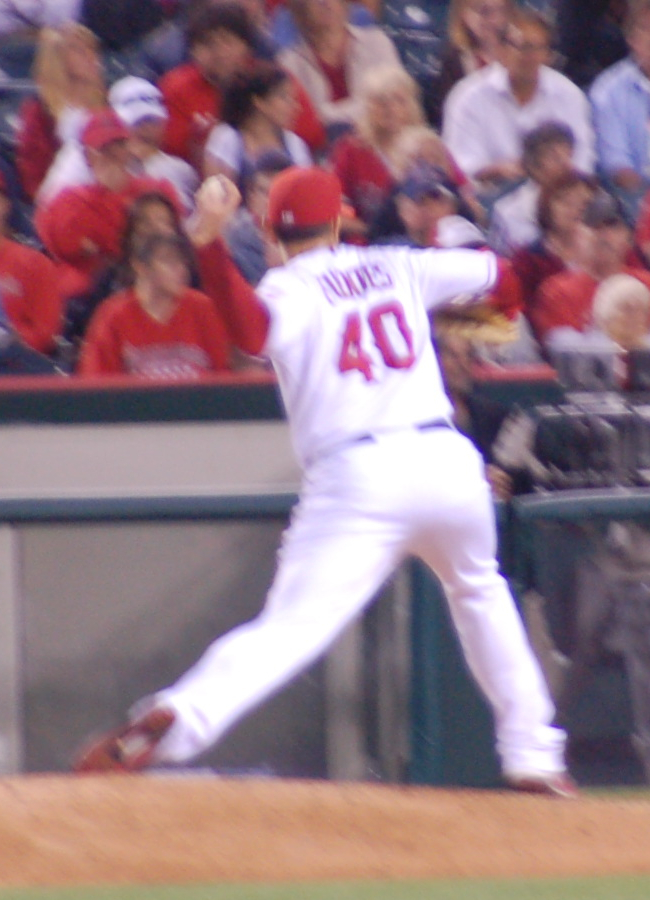
Fuentes pitching for the Angels

On December 31, 2008, Fuentes agreed to a two-year deal with the Angels to fill in the position as closer after Francisco Rodríguez left for the Mets. On July 5, 2009, Fuentes was elected to represent Anaheim in the 2009 All Star Game, at the time leading the majors in saves.

Fuentes led the major leagues in saves with 48 in 2009, despite a 3.93 ERA and 1.40 WHIP. His strikeout to walk ratio decreased from a 3.73 rate with the 2008 Colorado Rockies to a much more modest 1.92 in 2009. His difficulties led manager Mike Scoscia to call in young reliever Kevin Jepsen to close at certain times.

=== Minnesota Twins ===
On August 27, 2010, Fuentes was traded to the Minnesota Twins for a player to be named later. While Fuentes had been a closer with the Angels, he was expected to be a set-up man with the Twins. Nevertheless, Fuentes earned a save in his first outing with the Twins, a 1–0 win over the Seattle Mariners.

=== Oakland Athletics ===
On January 16, 2011, Fuentes reportedly agreed to a two-year deal with the Oakland Athletics. The A's Manager Bob Geren demoted him from the closing role once again in May 2011, reportedly due to performance issues. In the same general timeframe, Fuentes made public statements critical Geren's management, as did former A's reliever Huston Street. Fuentes was designated for assignment on July 3, 2012, to clear a roster spot for returning pitcher Bartolo Colón. Fuentes was released from the Oakland Athletics on July 11, 2012.

=== St. Louis Cardinals ===
Fuentes signed a minor league contract with the St. Louis Cardinals on July 14, 2012. On July 25, 2012, Fuentes's contract was purchased from AA-Springfield. He replaced Victor Marte, who was optioned to Triple-A Memphis that same day.

On August 14, 2012, Fuentes was placed on the Cardinals' restricted list after requesting time off for undisclosed personal reasons. He did not return during the 2012 season.

=== Retirement ===
On November 14, 2012, Fuentes told the Merced Sun-Star that he was retiring after twelve seasons in the Major Leagues. Said Fuentes: "Ultimately, I was just having trouble with the time away from my family. I've been playing baseball for all of their lives, but I'd never been so far away as when I was in St. Louis." Fuentes finished his career with an overall record of 26 wins, 43 losses and a career ERA of 3.62 with 204 saves. He was a four-time All-Star.

== Pitching style ==
Fuentes' pitching delivery was a unique and sometimes confusing one, especially for left-handed hitters. He pitched sidearm, which was difficult for hitters to pick up and kept them off balance. Many batters, mainly left-handers, said the ball appeared to be coming out of the sleeve of his jersey. His fastball usually clocked between 89 and 92 miles per hour.

== Personal life ==
Brian Fuentes has a wife (Barbara), his oldest son Giovanni, two fraternal twins, Benicio and Gabriella, and their youngest child Farrah.

Fuentes currently makes his offseason home in Merced, California. Fuentes comes from a Mexican American family.

== See also ==
- List of Colorado Rockies team records
- List of Major League Baseball annual saves leaders
