= Matt Palmer (baseball) =

American baseball player (born 1979)

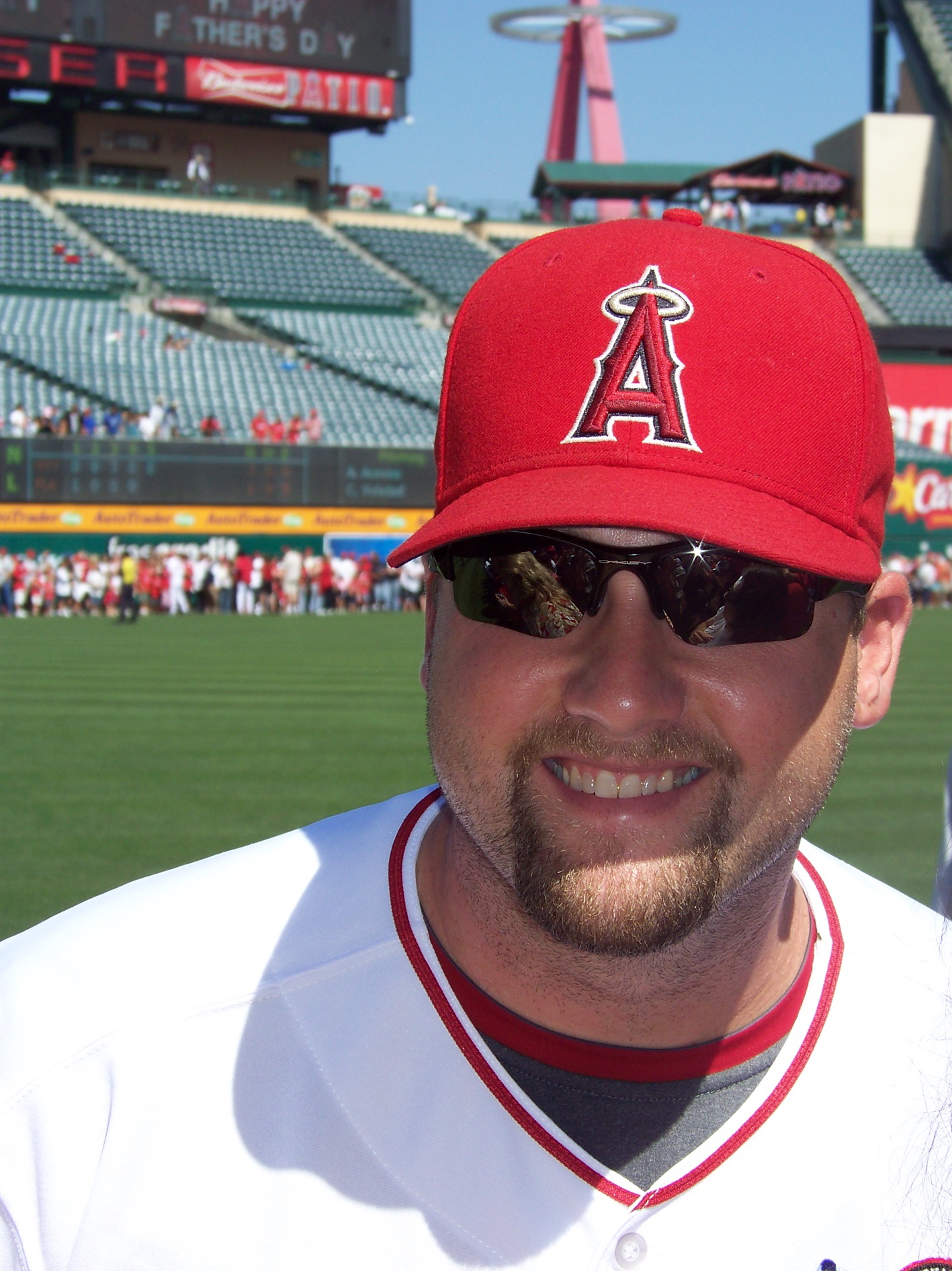
- Palmer with the Los Angeles Angels of Anaheim
- Pitcher
- Born: March 21, 1979 (age 47); Memphis, Tennessee, U.S.
- Batted: Right Threw: Right

MLB debut
- August 16, 2008, for the San Francisco Giants

Last appearance
- May 26, 2012, for the San Diego Padres

MLB statistics
- Win–loss record: 13–7
- Earned run average: 4.56
- Strikeouts: 98
- Stats at Baseball Reference

Teams
- San Francisco Giants (2008); Los Angeles Angels of Anaheim (2009–2011); San Diego Padres (2012)

Jonathan Matthew Palmer (born March 21, 1979) is an American former professional baseball pitcher. He bats and throws right-handed. He attended Three Rivers College and Southwest Missouri State University.

== Playing career ==
=== San Francisco Giants ===
Drafted by the San Francisco Giants in the 31st round of the 2002 Major League Baseball draft, Palmer started his professional career strong by having a 1.83 ERA in 2002 with the Salem-Keizer Volcanoes. Palmer spent the 2003 season with the Hagerstown Suns. However, Palmer spent three seasons in Double-A before earning a promotion to Triple-A Fresno in 2006. In 2007, Palmer pitched 150 innings for Fresno, recording an 11-8 record with a 4.32 ERA.

On August 14, 2008, Palmer was called up by the Giants. He made his Major League debut on August 16 against the Atlanta Braves. He started but only lasted 2.1 innings and allowed 6 earned runs. After making 3 starts, he was sent back to Triple-A and became a free agent at the end of the season. He was 0-2 in his 3 starts for the Giants with an 8.53 ERA.

=== Los Angeles Angels of Anaheim ===
In December 2008, he signed a minor league contract with an invitation to spring training with the Los Angeles Angels of Anaheim.

In 2009, Palmer was a fifth starter, as the Angels starting rotation struggled to overcome injuries and the death of rookie Nick Adenhart. Palmer made his Angels debut on April 23, 2009, earning the win after pitching six innings, giving up five runs on six hits, three walks, and one strikeout. He continued in the Angels starting rotation amassing a 7-1 record until he was moved to the bullpen on July 1, 2009 when Ervin Santana returned. He finished the season 11-2 with a 3.93 ERA. His elevated win and loss record is helped by the fact that the Angels lineup scored 7.47 runs per game and scored in double figures five times he pitched.

In 2010, Palmer was seen as a possible fifth starter after Angels ace John Lackey signed with the Boston Red Sox.

However, the signing of Joel Piñeiro diminished any chances of Palmer in the starting rotation, and he returned to the bullpen for the 2010 season. In 3 seasons in the Angels organization, Palmer pitched in 57 games (17 as a starter) with a 4.22 ERA and 13-5 record. He also spent substantial time with the Triple-A Salt Lake Bees. He was sent outright to Triple-A on September 1. He elected free agency on September 29.

=== San Diego Padres ===
On November 30, 2011, The San Diego Padres signed Palmer to a minor league contract. He had his contract selected to the major leagues on May 20. He was designated for assignment on June 4, he cleared waivers and was sent outright to Triple-A Tucson Padres on June 8. He became a free agent following the season on October 10. He appeared in 3 games for the Padres in the Majors and allowed 2 earned runs in 2 innings. He was also 6-9 with a 5.66 ERA in 20 starts for Triple-A Tucson.

=== Los Angeles Dodgers ===
On December 18, 2012, Palmer signed as a minor league free agent with the Los Angeles Dodgers. During spring training, he tore the medial meniscus in his left knee, ending any chance he had to make the Dodgers roster. He eventually joined the Triple-A Albuquerque Isotopes roster in late April. In 25 games (22 of which were starts), he was 6-8 with a 3.84 ERA. He became a free agent following the season on November 4.

=== Seattle Mariners ===
On December 13, 2013, Palmer signed a minor league contract with the Seattle Mariners. On August 17, 2014, Palmer was released by the Mariners.

== Post-playing career ==
Palmer became a youth baseball coach. He coached the American Leadership Academy high school team in Glendale, Arizona in 2023 and 2024 before becoming the baseball coach at Central High School in Cape Girardeau, Missouri in July 2024.

Palmer is currently the head baseball coach at Three Rivers College, in Poplar Bluff, Missouri.
