= Anthony Ortega (baseball) =

Venezuelan baseball player (born 1985)

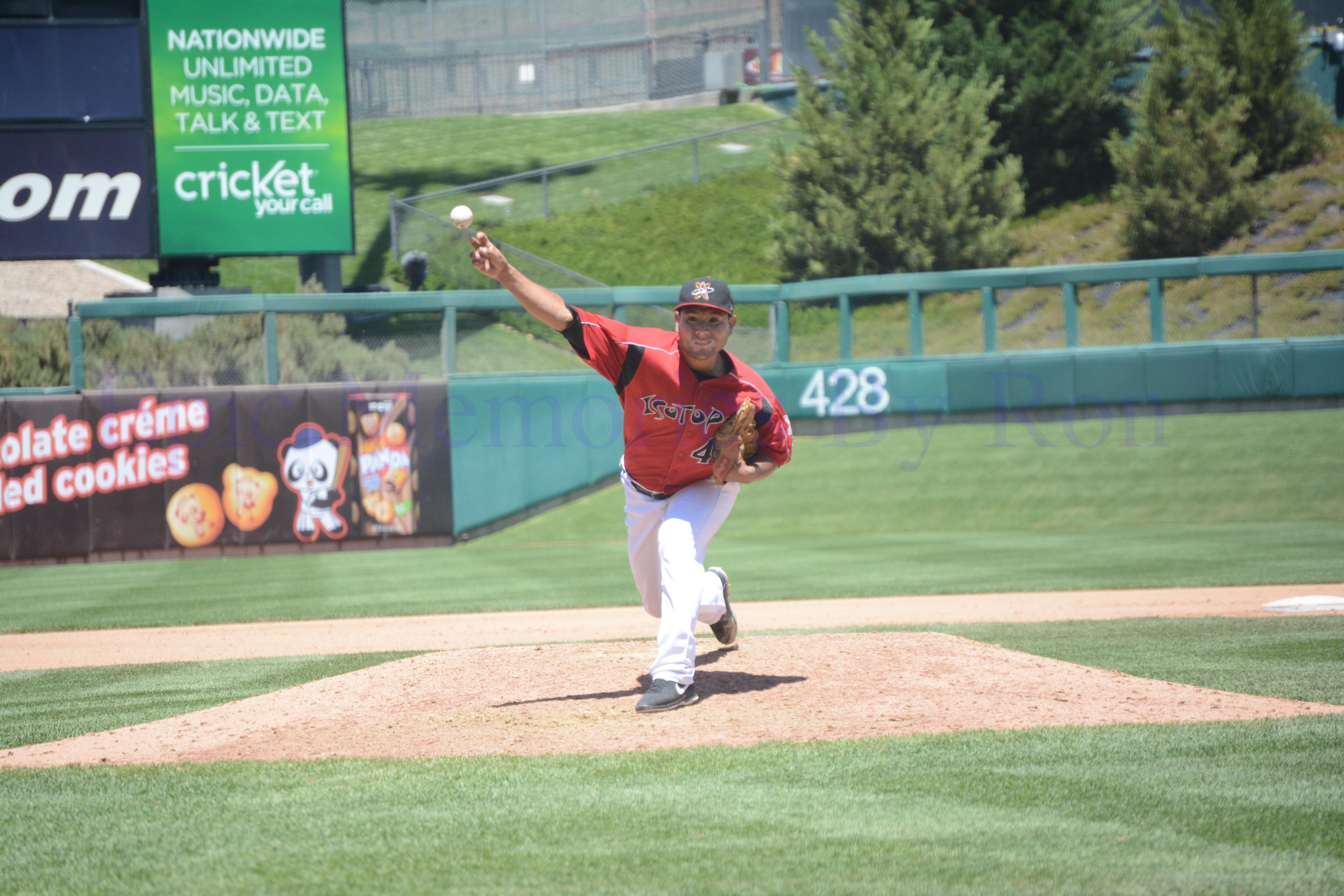
- Pitcher
- Born: August 24, 1985 (age 40); Ocumare del Tuy, Venezuela
- Batted: Right Threw: Right

MLB debut
- April 25, 2009, for the Los Angeles Angels of Anaheim

Last appearance
- May 6, 2009, for the Los Angeles Angels of Anaheim

MLB statistics
- Win–loss record: 0–2
- Earned run average: 9.24
- Strikeouts: 7
- Stats at Baseball Reference

Teams
- Los Angeles Angels of Anaheim (2009)

Anthony Yoel Ortega Martínez (born August 24, 1985) is a Venezuelan former professional baseball pitcher. He played in Major League Baseball (MLB) for the Los Angeles Angels of Anaheim in 2009.

== Professional career ==
Ortega was signed as an amateur free agent by the Anaheim Angels on October 13, 2003. He made his major league debut on April 25, 2009 against the Seattle Mariners. He took the loss, giving up four runs in five innings of work. He made 3 starts for the Angels in 2009, losing 2 of them with a 9.24 ERA.

Ortega spent the entire 2010 season on the 60-day disabled list and was released on November 17, 2011. He also missed the entire 2012 season after undergoing Tommy John surgery.

On November 16, 2012 the Kansas City Royals signed Ortega to a minor-league contract for the 2013 season. He was released by the Royals in April 2013 and signed a subsequent minor league contract with the Los Angeles Dodgers. He was assigned to the Triple-A Albuquerque Isotopes.

== See also ==
- List of Major League Baseball players from Venezuela
