= Jason Bulger =

American baseball player (born 1978)

- Pitcher
- Born: December 6, 1978 (age 47); Lawrenceville, Georgia, U.S.
- Batted: Right Threw: Right

MLB debut
- August 26, 2005, for the Arizona Diamondbacks

Last MLB appearance
- April 23, 2011, for the Los Angeles Angels of Anaheim

MLB statistics
- Win–loss record: 7–2
- Earned run average: 4.33
- Strikeouts: 138
- Stats at Baseball Reference

Teams
- Arizona Diamondbacks (2005); Los Angeles Angels of Anaheim (2006–2011)

Jason Patrick Bulger (born December 6, 1978) is an American former professional baseball pitcher. He played in Major League Baseball (MLB) for the Arizona Diamondbacks and Los Angeles Angels of Anaheim. Bulger played college baseball at Valdosta State University.

== Career ==
=== Arizona Diamondbacks ===
Bulger made his MLB debut on August 26, 2005, while a member of the Arizona Diamondbacks.

=== Los Angeles Angels of Anaheim ===
He was traded to the Angels during spring training in 2006 for infielder Alberto Callaspo. He made his Angels debut on May 20, 2006, after the team released third baseman Edgardo Alfonzo earlier in the day to make room for him on the roster. He was reassigned to the minor leagues on May 23, to make room for callup Kendrys Morales. He was called up in 2007 when rosters expanded on September 1.

On March 30, 2008, the Angels released their Opening Day roster and Bulger made the team. He was optioned down to the minors on August 27. On July 28, 2009, Bulger recorded his first career save in the majors against the Cleveland Indians.

On April 27, 2011, Bulger was designated for assignment after making five appearances for the Angels in the 2011 season with a 0.96 ERA and striking out seven. He cleared waivers, and accepted his demotion to the Triple-A Salt Lake Bees.

=== New York Yankees ===
Bulger signed a minor league contract with the Minnesota Twins on November 18, 2011. He was released at the end of spring training.

Bulger signed a minor league contract with the New York Yankees on April 1, 2012.
