= Nick Adenhart =

American baseball player (1986–2009)

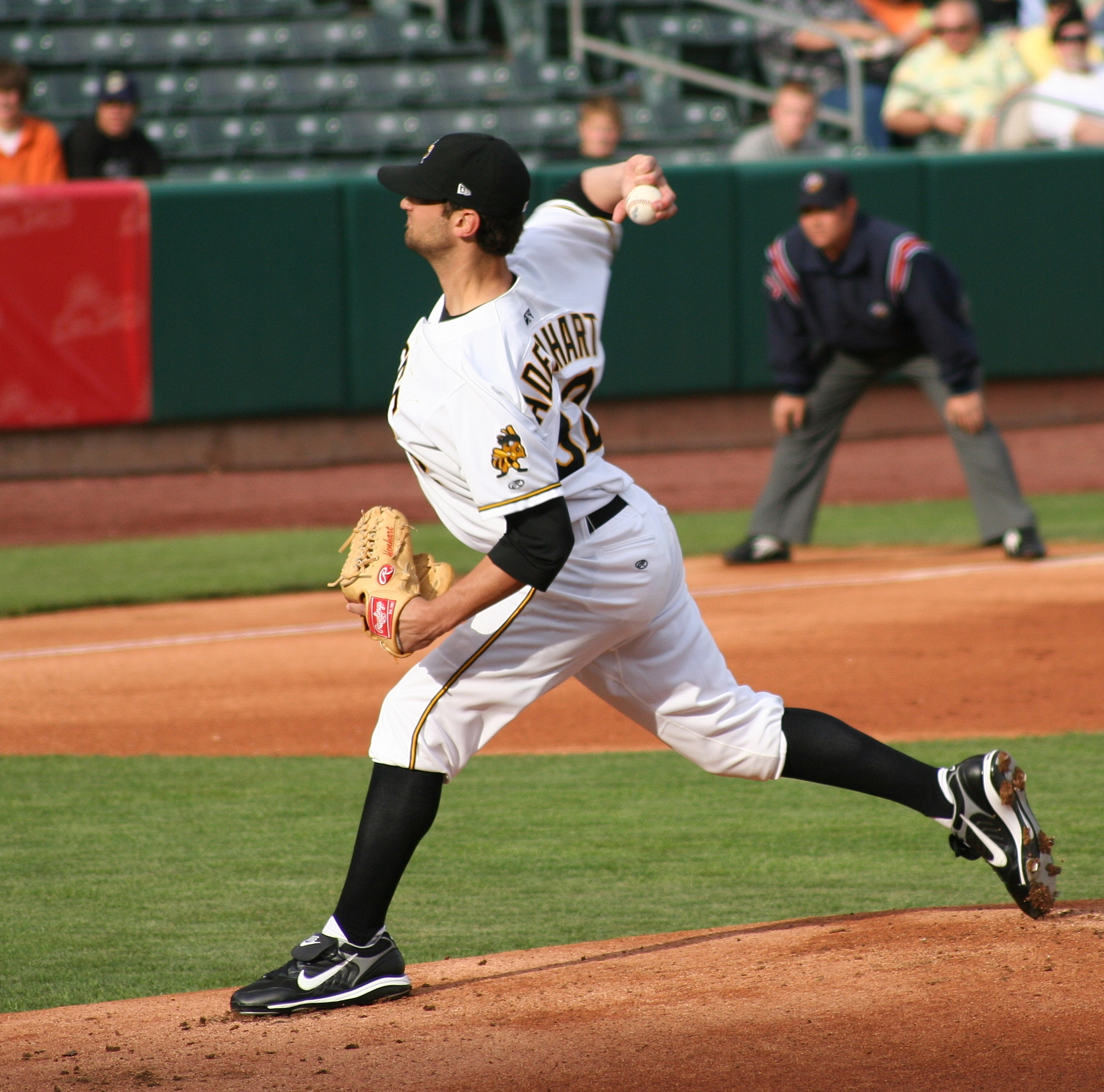
- Adenhart pitching for the Salt Lake Bees in 2008
- Pitcher
- Born: August 24, 1986; Silver Spring, Maryland, U.S.
- Died: April 9, 2009 (aged 22); Orange, California, U.S.
- Batted: Right Threw: Right

MLB debut
- May 1, 2008, for the Los Angeles Angels of Anaheim

Last MLB appearance
- April 8, 2009, for the Los Angeles Angels of Anaheim

MLB statistics
- Win–loss record: 1–0
- Earned run average: 6.00
- Strikeouts: 9
- Stats at Baseball Reference

Teams
- Los Angeles Angels of Anaheim (2008–2009)

Nicholas James Adenhart (August 24, 1986 – April 9, 2009) was an American right-handed baseball starting pitcher who played parts of two seasons in Major League Baseball (MLB) for the Los Angeles Angels of Anaheim. In just four career games, Adenhart pitched 18 innings and posted a win-loss record of 1–0.

A graduate of Williamsport High School, Adenhart was highly touted as a high school prospect until an injury in his final game required Tommy John surgery. The Angels drafted him in the 14th round of the 2004 Major League Baseball draft, and he began playing in their minor league system after the surgery was a success. He spent three full seasons in the minor leagues before making his major league debut on May 1, 2008. After appearing in three games, Adenhart spent the rest of 2008 in the minor leagues, developing his skills, and in 2009, he earned a spot in the Angels' starting rotation.

Just after pitching his first start of 2009, Adenhart was killed in a collision with a drunk driver. Both the Angels and the Salt Lake Bees, for whom Adenhart played in 2008, suspended their next games. Many tributes to him were held throughout the season, including his former teammates celebrating him by spraying champagne and beer on one of his jerseys after they clinched the 2009 American League West division championship.

== Early life ==
Nicholas James Adenhart was born in Silver Spring, Maryland, the only son of Janet and Jim Adenhart, a former United States Secret Service officer. His parents divorced and Janet later remarried Duane Gigeous, with whom she had a son named Henry, who was a pitcher at the University of Oregon. Adenhart played Halfway Little League Baseball for Gehr Construction and attended Springfield Middle School in Williamsport, Maryland. He pitched for the Hagerstown PONY League for six years and was a member of the 1999 team that won the Maryland District 1 title.

After graduating from middle school, Adenhart attended Saint Maria Goretti High School in Hagerstown, Maryland. He played shortstop and outfield, in addition to pitching. While attending Saint Maria Goretti, Adenhart was a guard on the basketball team that won the Baltimore Catholic League championship. At the age of 14, Adenhart joined the Oriolelanders, a showcase team composed of Maryland amateur players and sponsored by the Baltimore Orioles, where he would stay for four years. In 2003, at the age of 16, Adenhart pitched for the Youse's Maryland Orioles, who went on to win the All American Amateur Baseball Association Tournament for that year.

Adenhart transferred to Williamsport High School after his sophomore year, where he gave up basketball to focus solely on baseball, as a pitcher. Scouts began closely following him when he was named the top junior prospect by Baseball America.

Adenhart had a 6–0 record with a 1.04 earned run average during the regular season in his junior year, and as a result, he was named the Gatorade Player of the Year in Maryland. In a 1–0 loss during the playoff quarterfinal matchup, he threw a no-hitter and had 14 strikeouts. Entering his final high school season, Baseball America dubbed Adenhart the top high school prospect in the country. In his senior year, Adenhart threw a perfect game in his first outing, striking out 15 of the 21 batters faced. Entering the final regular-season game of his high school career, he had a 5–1 record, a 0.73 ERA, and an average of 2.2 strikeouts per inning. During November of his senior year, Adenhart signed a letter of intent to play with the North Carolina Tar Heels baseball team at the University of North Carolina, although his chances of being drafted high continued to climb and the North Carolina coaching staff saw their chances of acquiring Adenhart to be slim.

In his final high school game, in front of two dozen scouts, Adenhart felt a pop in his elbow after throwing a curveball to the third batter. The injury, which abruptly ended his season, was a partial ligament tear in his elbow that required Tommy John surgery. Though he had originally been projected as a first-round draft pick, the injury caused his stock to plummet two weeks before the 2004 Major League Baseball draft.

== Professional career ==
=== Draft and minor leagues ===
He fell to the 413th overall pick in the 14th round, selected by the Anaheim Angels. Angels scout Dan Radcliff and director of scouting Eddie Bane convinced Adenhart to forego a scholarship offer from the University of North Carolina and signed him to a $710,000 bonus ($1,020,000 in 2021) on July 26, 2004. After having Dr. James Andrews perform the Tommy John surgery, Adenhart spent the next year rehabilitating his elbow at the Angels' rehab facility in Tempe, Arizona. During that time, Adenhart also attended classes at Arizona State University.

Adenhart made his professional debut on June 25, 2005, with the Pioneer League's Orem Owlz, the Angels' Rookie League affiliate. In his single appearance for the Owlz, he pitched six innings, allowed one unearned run, struck out seven, and earned the win. He spent the rest of the 2005 season with the Angels of the Arizona League that summer. In 13 games for the Angels, he had a 2–3 record, a 3.68 ERA, and 52 strikeouts. The following spring, at the age of 19, Adenhart was one of twelve pitchers who earned a non-roster invitation to the Angels' big league camp. As the 2006 season began, he was also considered the Angels' sixth-best prospect and the 90th-best overall by Baseball America. Adenhart was assigned to the Cedar Rapids Kernels, the Angels' Low-A affiliate, after spring training. He pitched well for the Kernels. In 16 games, Adenhart had 10 wins, a 1.95 ERA, and 99 strikeouts in 106 innings pitched. His performance earned him a starting assignment in the 2006 All-Star Futures Game on June 21 and a promotion to the Rancho Cucamonga Quakes, the organization's High-A affiliate, soon after. He continued his efforts with the Quakes, winning five games and losing two in nine starts. Adenhart was a member of the United States Olympic Qualifying team in 2006, along with fellow Angels prospect Brandon Wood.

In 2007, Adenhart became a top-ranked prospect in the Angels organization. Baseball America ranked him as the 34th-best prospect in baseball and second in the Angels organization. He was called up to the Double-A Arkansas Travelers for which he played the 2007 season. In 26 appearances, he had a record of 10–8 with a 3.65 ERA. The following year, Adenhart was called up to the Triple-A Salt Lake Bees, where he spent the majority of the 2008 season. He was declared the 24th-best prospect in the majors that season. In the month of April, Adenhart had a 4–0 record with a 0.87 ERA and 21 strikeouts in 31 innings.

=== Los Angeles Angels of Anaheim (2008–2009) ===
As a result, he was brought up to the Angels' major league roster, and was scheduled to make his debut on May 1, pitching on three days' rest. Shortstop Maicer Izturis was placed on the disabled list when Adenhart was brought up.

"I got called up, and I was realizing a dream. I felt like I had to not give up any runs and throw a shutout every time out and wow everybody. I put pressure on myself. That was enough of that. I'm just having fun now."

— Nick Adenhart reflecting on the 2008 season, Baseball America, April 6, 2009.

Adenhart made his MLB debut as the starting pitcher against the Oakland Athletics at home in Angel Stadium of Anaheim. At the time, he was the youngest active-roster pitcher in the major leagues. In his debut, he gave up five earned runs and walked five in two innings, earning a no-decision in a 15–8 loss. Adenhart was disappointed in his first appearance, saying, "I let down the team first. You always want to go out and prove yourself to your teammates and your manager and your coaches. I was a disappointment to myself also." His second start was against the Kansas City Royals, where he earned another no-decision, allowing three earned runs and striking out three over 4 1/3 innings in a 5–3 win by the Angels. The reaction to his second start was more positive, with manager Mike Scioscia saying, "it was definitely a start in the right direction." Adenhart earned his only career decision, a victory, on May 12, 2008, against the Chicago White Sox in Anaheim, giving up four earned runs in 5 2/3 innings en route to a 10–7 Angels victory. After the win against the White Sox, Adenhart was sent back down to the Salt Lake Bees. He spent the rest of the 2008 season at Salt Lake, amassing a 9–13 record with a 5.76 ERA in 26 games.

Adenhart was declared the best prospect in the Angels organization going into 2009, and was ranked 68th overall on Baseball America's 2009 Top 100 Prospects list, citing his 158 innings pitched per year over the past three seasons. Adenhart earned his spot in the Angels' 2009 starting rotation during spring training. He appeared in six starts and had a 3–0 record with a 3.12 ERA over 26 innings pitched. He allowed only nine earned runs and five walks, while striking out 18. Adenhart opened the 2009 season as the third starter in the Angels' rotation. In his season debut on April 8, 2009, he earned a no-decision, giving up seven hits and no runs while striking out five batters and walking three in six innings against the Oakland Athletics at Angel Stadium of Anaheim.

== Death ==
Shortly after midnight on April 9, 2009, Adenhart was involved in a car crash in Fullerton, California, at the intersections of Orangethorpe Avenue and Lemon Street, just hours after being the starting pitcher in the previous night's game. Police reported that a person driving a red Toyota Sienna minivan ran a red light and broadsided a gray Mitsubishi Eclipse in which Adenhart was a passenger, sending it crashing into a telephone pole. The driver of the Eclipse, Cal State Fullerton cheerleader Courtney Stewart, as well as another passenger, Henry Pearson, were pronounced dead at the scene.

Adenhart and Jon Wilhite, another passenger in the Mitsubishi, were taken to University of California, Irvine Medical Center, where Adenhart died as a result of his injuries at the age of 22. Wilhite suffered internal decapitation and survived after undergoing five hours of surgery to reattach his skull to his spine six days after the crash.

The minivan driver ran from the scene, but was later arrested. Later tests showed that the driver, Andrew Thomas Gallo, was legally intoxicated, as was the driver of the car in which Adenhart was traveling, Courtney Stewart.

After a two-week jury trial held in September 2010, Gallo was convicted on three counts of second-degree murder, two counts of driving under the influence causing great bodily injury, and one felony count of hit-and-run. Another trial found him guilty of driving on a suspended license. Judge Richard F. Toohey sentenced him to 51 years to life in prison, 15 years for each life taken plus six more years for other related crimes.

=== Memorials ===
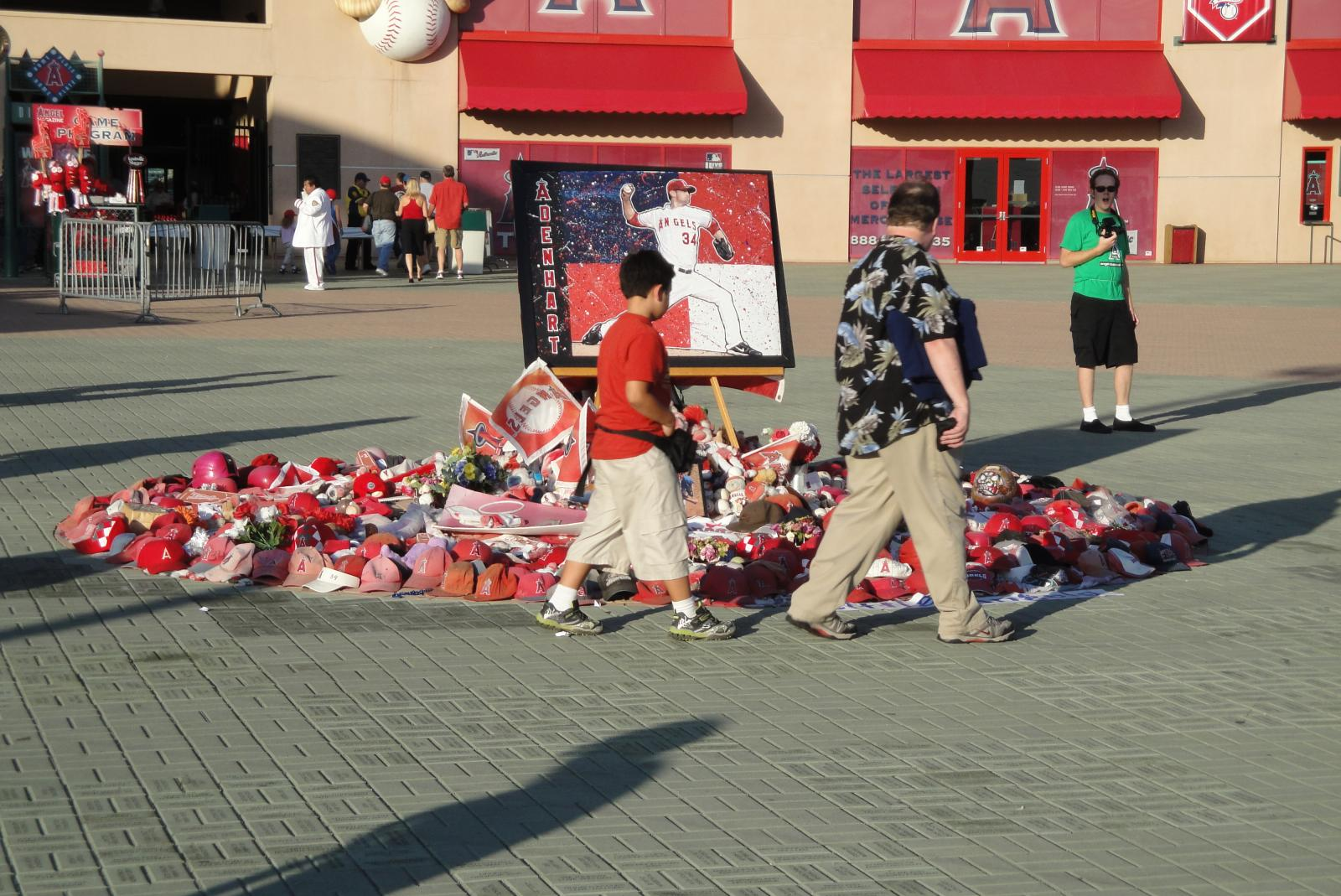
Makeshift shrine outside the home plate gates to Angel Stadium

Adenhart's family released this statement, following his death:

Nick's family expresses sincere gratitude for all the help the Angels have provided. He lived his dream and was blessed to be part of an organization comprised of such warm, caring, and compassionate people. The Angels were his extended family. Thanks to all of Nick's loyal supporters and fans throughout his career. He will always be in everyone's hearts forever.

Angels General Manager Tony Reagins released a statement, as well:

The Angels family has suffered a tremendous loss today. We are deeply saddened and shocked by this tragic loss. Our thoughts and prayers go out to Nick's family, friends, loved ones, and fans.

The Angels postponed the game against the Athletics for the day immediately after Adenhart's death. In remembrance of Adenhart, for the rest of the 2009 season, a black number 34 patch was placed above the heart on the Angels' uniforms, his locker in the Angel Stadium of Anaheim clubhouse remained as it was, and a locker was assigned to him on road games. The team hung one of Adenhart's jerseys in their dugout during games.

A black-and-white photo of Adenhart, along with his name and number, was added to the center-field fence at Angel Stadium. A makeshift shrine, dedicated to Adenhart, was established outside the home plate gate to Angel Stadium. The makeshift shrine was maintained by Angels personnel until its removal in December 2009. The Angels do not have any plans to create a permanent memorial.

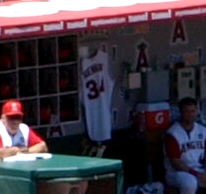
Adenhart's uniform hung inside the Angels home dugout during a 2009 game.

The Salt Lake Bees, the Angels' Triple-A affiliate, also postponed their game on April 9 against the Reno Aces. The team also wore a number 32 patch through the season representing Adenhart's jersey number during his time with the Bees. A number 32 was also painted on the grass in front of the Bees dugout.

On September 28, 2009, when the Angels celebrated winning the American League West division, they honored Adenhart by spraying champagne and beer on one of his jerseys, and then gathered in front of the outfield wall memorial for a team picture. The appropriateness of celebrating with alcohol in respect to Adenhart's death being alcohol-related was questioned, but family members were supportive of the celebrations. Adenhart's father Jim stated, "That's baseball. If Nick were there, he'd have been throwing a few back, as well." Adenhart's teammates voted to give his family a full playoff share for the 2009 playoffs worth $138,038.57. Angels manager Mike Scioscia dedicated his 2009 American League Manager of the Year Award to Adenhart.

The Angels established the Nick Adenhart Pitcher of the Year award given to an Angels pitcher for outstanding performance throughout the regular season. The team commissioned Harry Weber to create a bronze statue of Adenhart, which was to be on display in the Angel Stadium trophy case. Smaller versions of the statue are presented to all honorees of the Nick Adenhart award.

The Adenhart family created the Nick Adenhart Memorial Fund, which is designed to provide financial support to youth baseball organizations. The goal is to lend a helping hand to struggling leagues around the country to buy equipment and cover expenses to keep youth baseball functioning. The first presentation from the fund was for $5000 to the Halfway Little League in Halfway, Maryland. Two annual events, the Nick Adenhart 5K Run and Walk and the Nick Adenhart Baseball Camp, have been established to benefit the foundation.

Adenhart's number 21 jersey was retired by the Cedar Rapids Kernels, the Angels' Class A affiliate, on June 20, 2010. The Kernels, the Kernels Foundation, and the Adenhart family also established the Nick Adenhart Memorial Scholarship, a yearly $1,000 scholarship. The Orem Owlz, for whom Adenhart briefly played in 2005, have worn special jerseys, which bear the likeness of a screen-printed picture of Adenhart, along with his number 34. The Little League Baseball field where Adenhart played in Halfway, Maryland, was rededicated as the Nicholas James Adenhart Memorial Field. The Hagerstown Suns, the Minor League Baseball affiliate in Hagerstown, Maryland, held a fundraiser for the Nick Adenhart Memorial Fund and added Adenhart to their Wall of Fame at Municipal Stadium. The city of Manhattan Beach, Wilhite's home town, erected the Pearson-Wilhite-Stewart-Adenhart Commemorative Wall at Marine Avenue Park honoring all four victims of the crash.

As a memorial, Angels pitcher Jered Weaver wrote the initials "NA" in the dirt on the back of the pitcher's mound before each start in honor of Adenhart. Weaver also named his son Aden in memory of Adenhart. Mike Napoli, who caught Adenhart's final game, went out to center field before every game and wrote Adenhart's name in the warning track dirt. Darren O'Day, who came up through the Angels minor system with Adenhart, wrote Adenhart's number and initials on the brim of every new cap he wore. Baltimore Orioles pitcher Miguel González paid tribute to Adenhart, his former minor league teammate, by wearing one of his gloves in his first major league start, which was against the Angels on July 6, 2012.

Adenhart is buried at Greenlawn Cemetery, in Williamsport, Maryland, just across the street from Springfield Middle School, where he attended and played baseball as a child. A public memorial service was held at Williamsport High School the day after his burial.

Subsequent to Adenhart's death, his former high school teammate and close friend, David Warrenfeltz, was hired as the Williamsport High School baseball coach. In a crash described as "eerily similar to Adenhart's", the school's star pitcher and his girlfriend were both killed in a collision in 2012.

The Angels did not have another player wear Adenhart's number 34 until Noah Syndergaard wore it with the approval of the Adenhart family for the 2022 season. Syndergaard's first start with the team was on April 9, 2022, the 13th anniversary of Adenhart's death.

== See also ==
- List of baseball players who died during their careers
