= Kevin Jepsen =

American baseball player (born 1984)

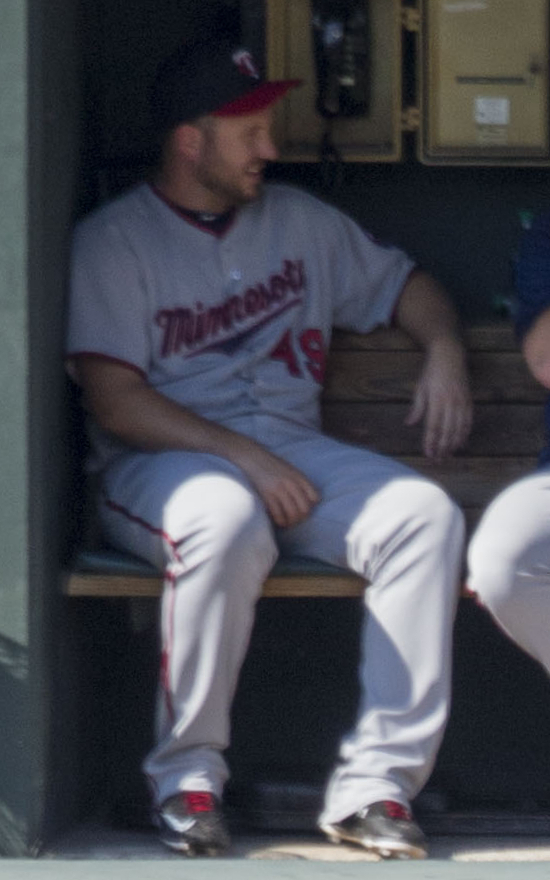
- Jepsen with the Twins in 2015
- Pitcher
- Born: July 26, 1984 (age 42); Anaheim, California, U.S.
- Batted: Right Threw: Right

MLB debut
- September 8, 2008, for the Los Angeles Angels of Anaheim

Last MLB appearance
- May 19, 2018, for the Texas Rangers

MLB statistics
- Win–loss record: 18–33
- Earned run average: 4.00
- Strikeouts: 373
- Stats at Baseball Reference

Teams
- Los Angeles Angels of Anaheim (2008–2014); Tampa Bay Rays (2015); Minnesota Twins (2015–2016); Tampa Bay Rays (2016); Texas Rangers (2018)
Medals
Men's baseball
Representing United States
Olympic Games
Bronze medal – third place	2008 Beijing	Team

Kevin Martin Jepsen (born July 26, 1984) is an American former professional baseball pitcher. He played in Major League Baseball (MLB) for the Los Angeles Angels of Anaheim, Tampa Bay Rays, Minnesota Twins, and Texas Rangers.

== Professional career ==
=== Los Angeles Angels of Anaheim ===
The Los Angeles Angels of Anaheim selected Jepsen in the second round (53rd overall) in the 2002 Major League Baseball draft out of Bishop Manogue High School.

Jepsen earned his first All-Star selection in the minor leagues, and was enjoying his finest season to date with a combined 3–4 record, 13 saves, a 1.87 earned run average and 55 strikeouts for the Arkansas Travelers and Salt Lake Bees when he was selected to play for the United States national baseball team at the 2008 Summer Olympics. He and his team won a bronze medal.

Jepsen made his major league debut against the New York Yankees on September 8, 2008, at Angel Stadium in Anaheim, California. He pitched one inning in a blowout game, retiring Derek Jeter, Bobby Abreu, and Alex Rodriguez in order. Jepsen pitched in nine games for the Angels in the 2008 season.

Jepsen had his first full major-league season in 2009. His first year was overshadowed by the death of his teammate and friend Nick Adenhart. Jepsen was responsible for hanging up Adenhart's jersey in the dugout every game. In spite of this, Jepsen threw a career-high 54 innings. He had shoulder tendinitis in September, slowing his return to Spring Training in 2010. Despite this, Jepsen appeared in 68 games, recording 2 wins and 4 losses in 59 innings. In 2011, Jepsen spent time between the disabled list and the minors, appearing in only 16 games.

=== Tampa Bay Rays ===
On December 16, 2014, he was traded to the Tampa Bay Rays in exchange for Matt Joyce.

=== Minnesota Twins ===
On July 31, 2015, the Minnesota Twins acquired Jepsen for Chih-Wei Hu and Alexis Tapia. After closer Glen Perkins suffered an injury in the first week of the 2016 season, Jepsen was given the closer role but struggled throughout the season in the closer role and in non save situations. On July 3, he was designated for assignment after posting an ERA of 6.16 while recording just 7 saves for the last place Twins. Jepsen was released on July 11.

=== Tampa Bay Rays (second stint) ===
On July 15, 2016, Jepsen signed a contract for the remainder of the season to return to the Rays. In 2016, balls hit against him had the highest average exit velocity in the major leagues, at 91.7 miles per hour.

=== Arizona Diamondbacks ===
On February 13, 2017, Jepsen signed a minor league contract with the Arizona Diamondbacks. He was released on March 25.

=== Washington Nationals ===
Nearing a return after losing the first half of the season to a quadriceps injury, Jepsen reportedly signed a minor league deal with a July 26 opt-out date on June 29, 2017, to join the Washington Nationals organization. In 19 appearances for the Triple–A Syracuse Chiefs, he recorded a 5.32 ERA with 29 strikeouts across 23 2/3 innings pitched. Jepsen elected free agency following the season on November 6.

=== Texas Rangers ===
On December 14, 2017, Jepsen signed a minor league contract with the Texas Rangers. Jepsen earned a spot on the Rangers' Opening Day roster. He was designated for assignment on May 21, 2018. He cleared waivers and elected free agency on May 25.

== Pitching style ==
Jepsen featured four pitches: a four-seam fastball at 95–99 mph, a two-seam fastball at 94–97, a cutter at 89–93, and a curveball at 83–86. Fans in the Diamond Club at Angels Stadium would routinely be in awe of what they were seeing. The cutter was rarely used against left-handed hitters, while the two-seamer was primarily thrown to lefties. Jepsen used his curveball most often in 2-strike counts.
