= Bobby Mosebach =

American baseball player (born 1984)

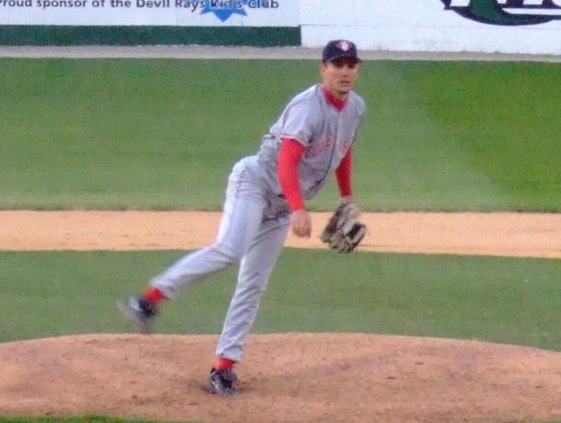
- Mosebach pitching for the Cedar Rapids Kernels in 2006
- Relief pitcher
- Born: September 14, 1984 (age 41); West Palm Beach, Florida, U.S.
- Batted: Right Threw: Right

MLB debut
- July 25, 2009, for the Los Angeles Angels of Anaheim

Last MLB appearance
- July 29, 2009, for the Los Angeles Angels of Anaheim

MLB statistics
- Win–loss record: 0-0
- Earned run average: 7.71
- Strikeouts: 2
- Stats at Baseball Reference

Teams
- Los Angeles Angels of Anaheim (2009)

Robert Jonathan Mosebach (born September 14, 1984) is an American former Major League Baseball relief pitcher.

Mosebach made his major league debut against the Minnesota Twins on July 25, 2009, at Angel Stadium of Anaheim, pitching one inning and giving up two hits. However, he was optioned to the Triple-A Salt Lake Bees just five days later. He elected for free agency at the end of the 2010 season.

On March 2, 2016, Mosebach signed with the Wichita Wingnuts of the American Association of Independent Professional Baseball.
