= 2011 Los Angeles Angels season =

Major League Baseball season

2011 Los Angeles Angels
- League: American League
- Division: West
- Ballpark: Angel Stadium
- City: Anaheim, California
- Record: 86–76 (.531)
- Divisional place: 2nd
- Owner: Arte Moreno
- General manager: Tony Reagins
- Manager: Mike Scioscia
- Television: FSN West; KCOP (My 13) (Victor Rojas, Mark Gubicza)
- Radio: KLAA (AM 830) KSPN (AM 710) (Terry Smith, José Mota) Spanish: KWKW (AM 1330)
- Stats: ESPN.com; Baseball Reference

The 2011 Los Angeles Angels season was the franchise's 51st season and 46th in Anaheim. The Angels began the season following a disappointing 2010 campaign where they missed the postseason for the first time since 2006, after winning the American League West three times in a row from 2007 to 2009. During the 2011 season, the Angels celebrated the franchise's 50th anniversary (while the team was created on December 6, 1960, the Angels decided to honor the 50th after 2010 ended). Marking the occasion for the "golden Anniversary" was the adding of gold trim was to the uniforms including the halo on both the cap and uniform (the halo from 1993 to 1996, 2002–2010 was silver and gold prior to that). On June 14, they beat the Seattle Mariners 4-0 to earn their 4,000th win in team history. The season saw the debut of Mike Trout, who made his major league debut on July 8, 2011. Although he batted .220 during his brief time on the year, he would be back the following season as the regular fielder for the team.

== 2010–11 offseason ==
After an incredibly disappointing 2010 season, the Angels' priority in the offseason was to fix what went horribly wrong so the team can return to the postseason in 2011. Owner Arte Moreno has gone on record saying that money will not be an issue, and that he is willing to spend as much as possible to put a winning product on the field. Going into the offseason, the Angels had both Hideki Matsui and Scot Shields eligible for free agency with Kendrys Morales, Jered Weaver, Erick Aybar, Howie Kendrick, Kevin Frandsen, Alberto Callaspo, Reggie Willits, and Mike Napoli being arbitration eligible. As of December 3, 2010, the Angels have declined to offer Matsui arbitration, tendered contracts to Morales, Weaver, Aybar, Kendrick, Callaspo, Willits, and Napoli. The Angels also declined to tender a contract to Frandsen, who would become a free agent, and Shields, who would retire from baseball.

The Angels expressed interest in Rays outfielder Carl Crawford, Red Sox third baseman Adrián Beltré, Rays closer Rafael Soriano, Phillies outfielder Jayson Werth, and were considered a wildcard in the Cliff Lee sweepstakes. On December 2, 2010, the Angels signed former Mets reliever Hisanori Takahashi in their first move of the offseason. then signed Blue Jays reliever Scott Downs, and also acquired outfielder Vernon Wells from Toronto in exchange for outfielder Juan Rivera and catcher Mike Napoli.

== Regular season ==
See the game log below for detailed game-by-game regular season information.

The season for the Angels began Thursday, March 31 with a road game against Kansas City. Their first home game was Friday, April 8 against Toronto. Their longest homestand will be from June 27 – July 10 (13 home games), and their longest road trip will be June 13–26 (12 road games). Their final game of the regular season will be on Wednesday, September 28 at home against Rangers.

=== March/April ===
After winning the first game of the season against Kansas City, the Angels stumbled dropping their next three games against that same Royals team. The Halos led at one point in each of those three losses and the suspect bullpen was a large reason why they dropped those three in a row. After the Kansas City series, manager Mike Scioscia shook up the bullpen by demoting Fernando Rodney from the closer's role and giving Jordan Walden that position. The Angels proceeded to sweep the Tampa Bay Rays in St. Petersburg and win and go 4–2 on their opening homestand against the Blue Jays and Indians. The Angels winning ways continued into their second road trip of the season sweeping the Chicago White Sox and taking 2 of 3 from division rival Texas and taking sole control of first in the American League West. However, the Angels hit a wall when they returned home to Angel Stadium being swept by arch-rival Boston in a four-game series and only scoring a total of five runs over that four game stretch. Texas, in the meantime took back the top spot in the AL West. After their abysmal showing against Boston, the Angels rebounded slightly by taking 2 of 3 from division rival Oakland finishing out the homestand 2–5. Going back to Tampa Bay, the Angels took the series 2–1 only losing the second game of the series on a wild pitch by relief pitcher Fernando Rodney in the 10th inning. The second game of the series also featured Joel Piñeiro's first start of the season where he only gave up one run over 7 innings pitched.

=== May ===
The Angels started out the month of May by finishing off a series with Tampa Bay that they won 2–1. After that series, the Angels flew to Boston to take on the team that swept them in Anaheim just a week prior. The Halos ended up dropping the first two games of that series, but ended up winning the third game of the series in a marathon 13 inning game that lasted 7 hours and 35 minutes thanks to a 2-hour and 35 minute rain delay. In the fourth game, the Angels pounded out 8 runs off of their former ace John Lackey and ended up winning the game 11–0 to earn the series split 2–2. Returning home to Anaheim where the Angels had a 6–7 mark, they were to face the red-hot Cleveland Indians in a three-game series. They won the first game in extra innings behind an excellent outing by rookie Tyler Chatwood and the bullpen, however the Angels then proceeded to drop the second game of the series. They did win the rubber game of the series on Mother's Day in a game that saw the lead change many times. The win against the Indians on May 8, marked manager Mike Scioscia's 1,000th career victory (all of which were with the Angels).

== Schedule and results ==
=== Regular season ===
2011 Game Log
March: 1–0 (Home: 0–0; Road: 1–0)

#	Date	Opponent	Score	Win	Loss	Save	Attendance	Record	Stadium	Box	GB
1	March 31	@ Royals	4–2	Weaver (1–0)	Hochevar (0–1)	Rodney (1)	40,055	1–0	Kauffman Stadium	W1	+1/2

April: 14–12 (Home: 6–7; Road: 8–5)

#	Date	Opponent	Score	Win	Loss	Save	Attendance	Record	Stadium	Box	GB
2	April 1	@ Royals	2–1	Soria (1–0)	Kohn (0–1)		13,302	1–1	Kauffman Stadium	L1	−1/2
3	April 2	@ Royals	5–4	Crow (1–0)	Jepsen (0–1)	Soria (1)	17,328	1–2	Kauffman Stadium	L2	−1 1/2
4	April 3	@ Royals	12–9 (13)	Collins (1–0)	Bulger (0–1)		14,085	1–3	Kauffman Stadium	L3	−2 1/2
5	April 5	@ Rays	5–3	Weaver (2–0)	Niemann (0–1)	Walden (1)	13,173	2–3	Tropicana Field	W1	−3
6	April 6	@ Rays	5–1	Haren (1–0)	Hellickson (0–1)		11,836	3–3	Tropicana Field	W2	−3
7	April 8	Blue Jays	3–2	Dotel (1–0)	Santana (0–1)	Rauch (2)	43,853	3–4	Angel Stadium	L1	−3 1/2
8	April 9	Blue Jays	6–5 (14)	Haren (2–0)	Rauch (0–1)		43,513	4–4	Angel Stadium	W1	−3
9	April 10	Blue Jays	3–1	Weaver (3–0)	Reyes (0–1)	Rodney (2)	43,525	5–4	Angel Stadium	W2	−3
10	April 11	Indians	4–0	Talbot (1–0)	Chatwood (0–1)		32,864	5–5	Angel Stadium	L1	−4
11	April 12	Indians	2–0	Haren (3–0)	Carmona (0–2)		43,529	6–5	Angel Stadium	W1	−3
12	April 13	Indians	4–3	Takahashi (1–0)	Durbin (1–0)		31,049	7–5	Angel Stadium	W2	−2
13	April 15	@ White Sox	4–3	Weaver (4–0)	Humber (1–1)	Walden (2)	20,103	8–5	U.S. Cellular Field	W3	−2
14	April 16	@ White Sox	7–2	Chatwood (1–1)	Floyd (1–1)		21,250	9–5	U.S. Cellular Field	W4	−1
15	April 17	@ White Sox	4–2	Haren (4–0)	Buehrle (1–1)	Walden (3)	23,458	10–5	U.S. Cellular Field	W5	0
16	April 18	@ Rangers	7–1	Wilson (2–0)	Santana (0–2)		30,799	10–6	Rangers Ballpark in Arlington	L1	−1
17	April 19	@ Rangers	15–4	Palmer (0–0)	Lewis (1–2)		22,450	11–6	Rangers Ballpark in Arlington	W1	0
18	April 20	@ Rangers	4–1	Weaver (5–0)	Harrison (3–1)		31,967	12–6	Rangers Ballpark in Arlington	W2	+1
19	April 21	Red Sox	4–2 (11)	Jenks (1–1)	Thompson (0–1)		37,003	12–7	Angel Stadium	L1	+1/2
20	April 22	Red Sox	4–3	Lester (2–1)	Haren (4–1)	Papelbon (5)	39,005	12–8	Angel Stadium	L2	−1/2
21	April 23	Red Sox	5–0	Matsuzaka (2–2)	Santana (0–3)		40,025	12–9	Angel Stadium	L3	−1 1/2
22	April 24	Red Sox	7–0	Lackey (2–2)	Palmer (1–1)		35,107	12–10	Angel Stadium	L4	−2 1/2
23	April 25	Athletics	5–0	Weaver (6–0)	Gonzalez (2–2)		37,115	13–10	Angel Stadium	W1	−1 1/2
24	April 26	Athletics	8–3	Chatwood (2–1)	McCarthy (1–2)		37,228	14–10	Angel Stadium	W2	−1/2
25	April 27	Athletics	2–1 (10)	Fuentes (1–2)	Walden (0–1)	Ziegler (1)	37,247	14–11	Angel Stadium	L1	−1 1/2
26	April 29	@ Rays	8–5	Santana (1–3)	Price (3–3)	Walden (4)	21,791	15–11	Tropicana Field	W1	0
27	April 30	@ Rays	2–1 (10)	Peralta (1–0)	Rodney (0–1)		20,245	15–12	Tropicana Field	L1	−1

May: 14–16 (Home: 7–6; Road: 7–10)

#	Date	Opponent	Score	Win	Loss	Save	Attendance	Record	Stadium	Box	GB
28	May 1	@ Rays	6–5	Thompson (1–1)	Peralta (1–1)	Walden (5)	16,248	16–12	Tropicana Field	W1	0
29	May 2	@ Red Sox	9–5	Buchholz (2–3)	Weaver (6–1)		37,017	16–13	Fenway Park	L1	0
30	May 3	@ Red Sox	7–3	Lester (4–1)	Haren (4–2)		37,043	16–14	Fenway Park	L2	0
31	May 4	@ Red Sox	5–3 (13)	Bell (1–0)	Matsuzaka (2–3)		37,037	17–14	Fenway Park	W1	0
32	May 5	@ Red Sox	11–0	Piñeiro (1–0)	Lackey (2–4)		37,013	18–14	Fenway Park	W2	+1
33	May 6	Indians	2–1 (11)	Rodney (1–1)	Germano (0–1)		36,447	19–14	Angel Stadium	W3	+2
34	May 7	Indians	4–3	White (1–0)	Weaver (6–2)	Perez (10)	37,684	19–15	Angel Stadium	L1	+1
35	May 8	Indians	6–5	Rodney (2–1)	Smith (1–1)	Walden (6)	40,124	20–15	Angel Stadium	W1	+2
36	May 9	White Sox	8–0	Jackson (3–4)	Santana (1–4)		38,561	20–16	Angel Stadium	L1	+1
37	May 10	White Sox	6–2	Piñeiro (2–0)	Danks (0–6)		40,128	21–16	Angel Stadium	W1	+2
38	May 11	White Sox	6–4	Santos (2–0)	Jepsen (0–2)	Thornton (1)	39,151	21–17	Angel Stadium	L1	+1 1/2
39	May 13	@ Rangers	4–1	Ogando (4–0)	Weaver (6–3)	Feliz (7)	45,995	21–18	Rangers Ballpark in Arlington	L2	+1/2
40	May 14	@ Rangers	3–2	Downs (1–0)	Oliver (1–4)	Walden (7)	47,663	22–18	Rangers Ballpark in Arlington	W1	+1 1/2
41	May 15	@ Rangers	5–4	Lowe (1–0)	Thompson (1–2)	Feliz (8)	48,284	22–19	Rangers Ballpark in Arlington	L1	+1/2
42	May 16	@ Athletics	5–4 (10)	Balfour (3–1)	Rodney (2–2)		11,061	22–20	Oakland–Alameda County Coliseum	L2	−1/2
43	May 17	@ Athletics	14–0	Gonzalez (5–2)	Chatwood (2–2)		12,190	22–21	Oakland–Alameda County Coliseum	L3	−1/2
44	May 18	@ Mariners	3–0	Vargas (3–2)	Weaver (6–4)	League (10)	16,992	22–22	Safeco Field	L4	−1 1/2
45	May 19	@ Mariners	2–1	Pauley (2–0)	Downs (1–1)		18,374	22–23	Safeco Field	L5	−1 1/2
46	May 20	Braves	9–0	Santana (2–4)	Hudson (4–4)		40,211	23–23	Angel Stadium	W1	−1/2
47	May 21	Braves	5–4 (12)	Proctor (1–0)	Bell (1–1)	Kimbrel (12)	43,511	23–24	Angel Stadium	L1	−1/2
48	May 22	Braves	4–1	Chatwood (3–2)	Lowe (3–4)	Walden (8)	40,098	24–24	Angel Stadium	W1	−1/2
49	May 23	Athletics	4–1	Downs (2–1)	Fuentes (1–7)	Walden (9)	36,215	25–24	Angel Stadium	W2	−1/2
50	May 24	Athletics	6–1	Moscoso (1–0)	Haren (4–3)		39,117	25–25	Angel Stadium	L1	−1/2
51	May 25	Athletics	4–1	Santana (3–4)	Cahill (6–2)	Walden (10)	40,253	26–25	Angel Stadium	W1	−1/2
52	May 26	Athletics	4–3	Anderson (3–4)	Piñeiro (2–1)		33,412	26–26	Angel Stadium	L1	−1
53	May 27	@ Twins	6–5	Downs (3–1)	Hoey (0–2)	Walden (11)	38,976	27–26	Target Field	W1	0
54	May 28	@ Twins	1–0	Burnett (1–3)	Takahashi (1–1)		39,824	27–27	Target Field	L1	−1
55	May 29	@ Twins	6–5	Haren (5–3)	Pavano (2–5)	Walden (12)	39,867	28–27	Target Field	W1	−1
56	May 30	@ Royals	10–8	Jepsen (1–2)	Soria (3–3)	Rodney (3)	24,406	29–27	Kauffman Stadium	W2	−1
57	May 31	@ Royals	7–3	Francis (2–5)	Piñeiro (2–2)		14,174	29–28	Kauffman Stadium	L1	−1

June: 13–12 (Home: 5–7; Road: 8–5)

#	Date	Opponent	Score	Win	Loss	Save	Attendance	Record	Stadium	Box	GB
58	June 1	@ Royals	2–0	Collins (3–2)	Downs (3–2)		12,022	29–29	Kauffman Stadium	L2	−2
59	June 3	Yankees	3–2	Weaver (7–4)	Nova (4–4)	Walden (13)	42,521	30–29	Angel Stadium	W1	−2 1/2
60	June 4	Yankees	3–2	Sabathia (7–3)	Santana (3–5)	Rivera (15)	43,619	30–30	Angel Stadium	L1	−3 1/2
61	June 5	Yankees	5–3	Colón (4–3)	Piñeiro (2–3)	Rivera (16)	43,524	30–31	Angel Stadium	L2	−4 1/2
62	June 6	Rays	5–1	Price (7–5)	Chatwood (3–3)		32,287	30–32	Angel Stadium	L3	−4 1/2
63	June 7	Rays	4–1	Cobb (1–0)	Haren (5–4)	Farnsworth (12)	38,833	30–33	Angel Stadium	L4	−4 1/2
64	June 8	Rays	4–3	Cruz (3–0)	Rodney (2–3)	Farnsworth (13)	33,157	30–34	Angel Stadium	L5	−5 1/2
65	June 10	Royals	4–2	Francis (3–6)	Santana (3–6)	Soria (9)	38,254	30–35	Angel Stadium	L6	−6
66	June 11	Royals	7–5	Downs (4–2)	Collins (3–3)	Walden (14)	38,911	31–35	Angel Stadium	W1	−5
67	June 12	Royals	9–0	Mazzaro (1–1)	Chatwood (3–4)		39,114	31–36	Angel Stadium	L1	−5
68	June 13	@ Mariners	6–3	Haren (6–4)	Vargas (4–4)	Walden (15)	20,238	32–36	Safeco Field	W1	−4 1/2
69	June 14	@ Mariners	4–0	Weaver (8–4)	Fister (3–8)		17,634	33–36	Safeco Field	W2	−3 1/2
70	June 15	@ Mariners	3–1	Bédard (4–4)	Santana (3–7)	League (19)	19,321	33–37	Safeco Field	L1	−3 1/2
71	June 17	@ Mets	4–3	Piñeiro (3–3)	Capuano (5–7)	Walden (16)	29,513	34–37	Citi Field	W1	−3
72	June 18	@ Mets	6–1	Pelfrey (4–5)	Haren (6–5)		31,538	34–38	Citi Field	L1	−4
73	June 19	@ Mets	7–3	Chatwood (4–4)	Niese (6–6)		36,213	35–38	Citi Field	W1	−3
74	June 20	@ Marlins	2–1	Weaver (9–4)	Cishek (0–1)	Walden (17)	16,984	36–38	Sun Life Stadium	W2	−3
75	June 21	@ Marlins	5–2	Vázquez (4–7)	Santana (3–8)	Núñez (20)	17,344	36–39	Sun Life Stadium	L1	−4
76	June 22	@ Marlins	6–5	Walden (1–1)	Badenhop (1–1)	Kohn (1)	19,721	37–39	Sun Life Stadium	W1	−3
77	June 24	@ Dodgers	8–3	Haren (7–5)	De La Rosa (3–2)		43,640	38–39	Dodger Stadium	W2	−3
78	June 25	@ Dodgers	6–1	Chatwood (5–4)	Kuroda (5–9)		41,108	39–39	Dodger Stadium	W2	−2
79	June 26	@ Dodgers	3–2	Kershaw (8–3)	Walden (1–2)		43,104	39–40	Dodger Stadium	L1	−2
80	June 27	Nationals	4–3 (10)	Downs (5–2)	Burnett (3–4)		35,032	40–40	Angel Stadium	W1	−1 1/2
81	June 28	Nationals	11–5	Takahashi (2–1)	Balester (1–1)		41,029	41–40	Angel Stadium	W2	−1 1/2
82	June 29	Nationals	1–0	Haren (8–5)	Zimmermann (5–7)	Walden (18)	35,258	42–40	Angel Stadium	W3	−1 1/2

July: 17–10 (Home: 10–3; Road: 7–7)

#	Date	Opponent	Score	Win	Loss	Save	Attendance	Record	Stadium	Box	GB
83	July 1	Dodgers	5–0	Kuroda (6–9)	Chatwood (5–5)		41,253	42–41	Angel Stadium	L1	−2
84	July 2	Dodgers	7–1	Weaver (10–4)	Kershaw (8–4)		42,232	43–41	Angel Stadium	W1	−1
85	July 3	Dodgers	3–1	Santana (4–8)	Billingsley (7–7)	Walden (19)	42,536	44–41	Angel Stadium	W2	0
86	July 4	Tigers	5–1	Piñeiro (4–3)	Furbush (1–2)		43,012	45–41	Angel Stadium	W3	0
87	July 5	Tigers	1–0	Haren (9–5)	Verlander (11–4)		39,006	46–41	Angel Stadium	W4	0
88	July 6	Tigers	5–4	Penny (6–6)	Takahashi (2–2)	Valverde (21)	31,549	46–42	Angel Stadium	L1	−1
89	July 7	Mariners	5–1	Weaver (11–4)	Fister (3–10)		41,223	47–42	Angel Stadium	W1	−1
90	July 8	Mariners	4–3	Walden (2–2)	Pauley (5–2)		40,161	48–42	Angel Stadium	W2	−1
91	July 9	Mariners	9–3	Piñeiro (5–3)	Pineda (8–6)		44,111	49–42	Angel Stadium	W3	−1
92	July 10	Mariners	4–2	Haren (10–5)	Pauley (5–3)	Walden (20)	39,505	50–42	Angel Stadium	W4	−1
July 12: All-Star Game (NL wins—Box)			5–1	Clippard (WAS)	C. J. Wilson (TEX)	B. Wilson (SF)	47,994		Chase Field	Phoenix, Arizona	
93	July 15	@ Athletics	5–3	McCarthy (2–5)	Haren (10–6)	Bailey (9)	18,470	50–43	O.co Coliseum	L1	−2 1/2
94	July 16	@ Athletics	4–2	Weaver (12–4)	Cahill (8–8)	Walden (21)		51–43	O.co Coliseum	W1	−2
95	July 16	@ Athletics	4–3 (10)	Ziegler (3–1)	Thompson (1–3)		27,379	51–44	O.co Coliseum	L1	−3
96	July 17	@ Athletics	9–1	Gonzalez (9–6)	Piñeiro (5–4)		26,115	51–45	O.co Coliseum	L2	−4
97	July 19	Rangers	7–0	Ogando (10–3)	Chatwood (5–6)		43,103	51–46	Angel Stadium	L3	−5
98	July 20	Rangers	9–8	Takahashi (3–2)	Hunter (1–1)	Walden (22)	40,052	52–46	Angel Stadium	W1	−4
99	July 21	Rangers	1–0	Weaver (13–4)	Wilson (10–4)	Walden (23)	38,315	53–46	Angel Stadium	W2	−3
100	July 22	@ Orioles	6–1	Santana (5–8)	Simón (2–3)	Takahashi (1)	24,823	54–46	Oriole Park at Camden Yards	W3	−3
101	July 23	@ Orioles	3–2	Bergesen (2–6)	Piñeiro (5–5)	Gregg (16)	20,311	54–47	Oriole Park at Camden Yards	L1	−4
102	July 24	@ Orioles	9–3	Chatwood (6–6)	Guthrie (4–14)		15,676	55–47	Oriole Park at Camden Yards	W1	−3
103	July 25	@ Indians	3–2	Walden (2–3)	Sipp (5–2)		19,384	55–48	Progressive Field	L1	−4
104	July 26	@ Indians	2–1	Weaver (14–4)	Tomlin (11–5)	Walden (24)	19,430	56–48	Progressive Field	W1	−3
105	July 27	@ Indians	3–1	Santana (6–8)**	Huff (1–1)		21,546	57–48	Progressive Field	W2	−2
106	July 28	@ Tigers	12–7	Cassevah (1–0)	Penny (7–8)		33,489	58–48	Comerica Park	W3	−2
107	July 29	@ Tigers	12–2	Porcello (11–6)	Chatwood (6–7)		40,551	58–49	Comerica Park	L1	−2
108	July 30	@ Tigers	5–1	Haren (11–6)	Turner (0–1)		40,753	59–49	Comerica Park	W1	−2
109	July 31	@ Tigers	3–2	Verlander (15–5)	Weaver (14–5)	Valverde (28)	36,878	59–50	Comerica Park	L1	−2
**Ervin Santana threw the ninth no-hitter in Angels history.

August: 14–13 (Home: 10–5; Road: 4–8)

#	Date	Opponent	Score	Win	Loss	Save	Attendance	Record	Stadium	Box	GB
110	August 2	Twins	5–1	Santana (7–8)	Duensing (8–9)		37,565	60–50	Angel Stadium	W1	−1
111	August 3	Twins	11–4	Swarzak (3–3)	Piñeiro (5–6)		35,555	60–51	Angel Stadium	L1	−1
112	August 4	Twins	7–1	Haren (12–6)	Liriano (7–9)		40,365	61–51	Angel Stadium	W1	−1
113	August 5	Mariners	1–0 (10)	Walden (3–3)	Cortes (0–1)		38,727	62–51	Angel Stadium	W2	−1
114	August 6	Mariners	5–1	Beavan (3–2)	Chatwood (6–8)		42,017	62–52	Angel Stadium	L1	−1
115	August 7	Mariners	2–1	Santana (8–8)	Hernández (10–10)	Walden (25)	38,823	63–52	Angel Stadium	W1	−1
116	August 9	@ Yankees	6–4	Downs (6–2)	Rivera (1–2)	Walden (26)	46,466	64–52	Yankee Stadium	W2	−1 1/2
117	August 10	@ Yankees	9–3	Nova (11–4)	Richards (0–1)		46,967	64–53	Yankee Stadium	L1	−1 1/2
118	August 11	@ Yankees	6–5	Soriano (2–1)	Rodney (2–4)	Rivera (30)	47,431	64–54	Yankee Stadium	L2	−2
119	August 12	@ Blue Jays	5–1	Santana (9–8)	Morrow (8–7)		24,731	65–54	Rogers Centre	W1	−2
120	August 13	@ Blue Jays	11–2	Romero (11–9)	Weaver (14–6)		27,185	65–55	Rogers Centre	L1	−3
121	August 14	@ Blue Jays	5–4 (10)	Rauch (5–3)	Rodney (2–5)		23,355	65–56	Rogers Centre	L2	−4
122	August 15	Rangers	8–4	Ogando (12–5)	Cassevah (1–1)		36,663	65–57	Angel Stadium	L3	−5
123	August 16	Rangers	7–3	Holland (11–4)	Chatwood (6–9)		43,711	65–58	Angel Stadium	L4	−6
124	August 17	Rangers	4–3	Wilson (12–5)	Santana (9–9)	Feliz (24)	36,581	65–59	Angel Stadium	L5	−7
125	August 18	Rangers	2–1	Ramírez (1–0)	Adams (1–2)		41,123	66–59	Angel Stadium	W1	−6
126	August 19	Orioles	8–3	Haren (13–6)	Reyes (6–10)		38,156	67–59	Angel Stadium	W2	−6
127	August 20	Orioles	9–8 (12)	Rodney (3–5)	Gregg (0–2)		43,201	68–59	Angel Stadium	W3	−5
128	August 21	Orioles	7–1	Williams (1–0)	Matusz (1–6)		37,148	69–59	Angel Stadium	W4	−4
129	August 23	White Sox	5–4	Walden (4–3)	Frasor (3–3)		37,728	70–59	Angel Stadium	W5	−3 1/2
130	August 24	White Sox	8–0	Weaver (15–6)	Stewart (1–3)		36,610	71–59	Angel Stadium	W6	−2 1/2
131	August 26	@ Rangers	11–7	Holland (12–5)	Haren (13–7)		38,256	71–60	Rangers Ballpark in Arlington	L1	−3
132	August 27	@ Rangers	8–4	Santana (10–9)	Wilson (13–6)	Takahashi (2)	48,453	72–60	Rangers Ballpark in Arlington	W1	−2
133	August 28	@ Rangers	9–5	Oliver (5–5)	Weaver (15–7)		40,018	72–61	Rangers Ballpark in Arlington	L1	−3
134	August 29	@ Mariners	5–3	Wilhelmsen (2–0)	Takahashi (3–3)	League (32)	16,990	72–62	Safeco Field	L1	−3 1/2
135	August 30	@ Mariners	13–6	Williams (2–0)	Vasquez (1–1)		15,536	73–62	Safeco Field	W1	−3 1/2
136	August 31	@ Mariners	2–1	Hernández (13–11)	Haren (13–8)		18,520	73–63	Safeco Field	L1	−3 1/2

September: 13–13 (Home: 7–8; Road: 6–5)

#	Date	Opponent	Score	Win	Loss	Save	Attendance	Record	Stadium	Box	GB
137	September 1	@ Mariners	4–3	Santana (11–9)	Furbush (3–7)	Walden (27)	19,453	74–63	Safeco Field	W1	−3 1/2
138	September 2	Twins	13–5	Pavano (7–11)	Chatwood (6–10)		37,198	74–64	Angel Stadium	L1	−4 1/2
139	September 3	Twins	10–6	Weaver (16–7)	Dumatrait (1–3)		39,102	75–64	Angel Stadium	W1	−3 1/2
140	September 4	Twins	4–1	Piñeiro (6–6)	Slowey (0–4)	Walden (28)	36,638	76–64	Angel Stadium	W2	−3 1/2
141	September 5	Mariners	7–3	Haren (14–8)	Vasquez (1–2)		35,497	77–64	Angel Stadium	W3	−2 1/2
142	September 6	Mariners	2–1	Hernández (14–11)	Santana (11–10)	League (33)	36,533	77–65	Angel Stadium	L1	−3 1/2
143	September 7	Mariners	3–1	Williams (3–0)	Furbush (3–8)	Walden (29)	37,459	78–65	Angel Stadium	W1	−2 1/2
144	September 9	Yankees	2–1	Walden (5–3)	Laffey (2–2)		41,014	79–65	Angel Stadium	W2	−2 1/2
145	September 10	Yankees	6–0	Haren (14–8)	Sabathia (19–8)		42,774	80–65	Angel Stadium	W3	−1 1/2
146	September 11	Yankees	6–5	Wade (5–0)	Santana (11–11)	Rivera (40)	42,581	80–66	Angel Stadium	L1	−2 1/2
147	September 12	@ Athletics	6–3	Gonzalez (13–12)	Piñeiro (6–7)		12,858	80–67	O.co Coliseum	L2	−3
148	September 13	@ Athletics	6–3	Takahashi (4–3)	De Los Santos (2–2)	Walden (30)	13,212	81–67	O.co Coliseum	W1	−3
149	September 14	@ Athletics	4–1	Weaver (17–7)	Harden (4–3)	Walden (31)	14,743	82–67	O.co Coliseum	W2	−3
150	September 16	@ Orioles	8–3	Hunter (4–4)	Haren (15–9)		24,022	82–68	Oriole Park at Camden Yards	L1	−3 1/2
151	September 17	@ Orioles	6–2	Britton (10–10)	Santana (11–12)		31,099	82–69	Oriole Park at Camden Yards	L2	−4 1/2
152	September 18	@ Orioles	11–2	Weaver (18–7)	Simón (4–9)		27,471	83–69	Oriole Park at Camden Yards	W1	−4 1/2
153	September 19	@ Blue Jays	3–2	Janssen (6–0)	Downs (6–3)		11,178	83–70	Rogers Centre	L1	−5
154	September 20	@ Blue Jays	10–6	Piñeiro (7–7)	Cecil (4–10)	Downs (1)	13,514	84–70	Rogers Centre	W1	−5
155	September 21	@ Blue Jays	7–2	Haren (16–9)	McGowan (0–1)		14,784	85–70	Rogers Centre	W2	−5
156	September 22	@ Blue Jays	4–3 (12)	Camp (5–3)	Richards (0–2)		22,769	85–71	Rogers Centre	L1	−5
157	September 23	Athletics	3–1	Gonzalez (15–12)	Weaver (18–8)	Bailey (22)	39,217	85–72	Angel Stadium	L2	−6
158	September 24	Athletics	4–2	Williams (4–0)	Moscoso (8–10)	Walden (32)	41,113	86–72	Angel Stadium	W1	−6
159	September 25	Athletics	6–5	De Los Santos (3–2)	Walden (5–4)	Bailey (23)	40,794	86–73	Angel Stadium	L1	−7
160	September 26*	Rangers	4–3	Hamburger (1–0)	Haren (16–10)	Feliz (31)	39,716	86–74	Angel Stadium	L2	−8
161	September 27	Rangers	10–3	Lewis (14–10)	Chatwood (6–11)		39,529	86–75	Angel Stadium	L3	−9
162	September 28	Rangers	3–1	Adams (5–4)	Walden (5–5)	Feliz (32)	39,612	86–76	Angel Stadium	L4	−10
*The Angels were officially eliminated from the AL West race on September 23 and from playoff contention on September 26.

Final games legend
Angels Win	Angels Loss	All-Star Game	Game postponed	Eliminated

"GB" Legend
1st (AL West)	Not in Playoff Position	1st (AL Wild Card)	Tied for 1st (AL West and/or Wild Card)

Regular Season Schedule (calendar style)
Regular Season Schedule (sortable text)

== Standings ==
=== Season standings ===
==== American League West ====
AL West
Team	W	L	Pct.	GB	Home	Road
Texas Rangers	96	66	.593	—	52‍–‍29	44‍–‍37
Los Angeles Angels	86	76	.531	10	45‍–‍36	41‍–‍40
Oakland Athletics	74	88	.457	22	43‍–‍38	31‍–‍50
Seattle Mariners	67	95	.414	29	39‍–‍45	28‍–‍50

==== American League Wild Card ====
Division winners
Team	W	L	Pct.
New York Yankees	97	65	.599
Texas Rangers	96	66	.593
Detroit Tigers	95	67	.586

Wild Card team (Top team qualifies for postseason)
Team	W	L	Pct.	GB
Tampa Bay Rays	91	71	.562	—
Boston Red Sox	90	72	.556	1
Los Angeles Angels	86	76	.531	5
Toronto Blue Jays	81	81	.500	10
Cleveland Indians	80	82	.494	11
Chicago White Sox	79	83	.488	12
Oakland Athletics	74	88	.457	17
Kansas City Royals	71	91	.438	20
Baltimore Orioles	69	93	.426	22
Seattle Mariners	67	95	.414	24
Minnesota Twins	63	99	.389	28

=== Record vs. opponents ===
2011 American League record Source: MLB Standings Grid – 2011
Team	BAL	BOS	CWS	CLE	DET	KC	LAA	MIN	NYY	OAK	SEA	TB	TEX	TOR	NL
Baltimore	–	8–10	4–4	2–5	5–5	5–4	3–6	6–2	5–13	4–5	4–2	9–9	1–5	6–12	7–11
Boston	10–8	–	2–4	4–6	5–1	5–3	6–2	5–2	12–6	6–2	5–4	6–12	4–6	10–8	10–8
Chicago	4–4	4–2	–	11–7	5–13	7–11	2–6	9–9	2–6	6–4	7–2	4–4	4–4	3–4	11–7
Cleveland	5–2	6–4	7–11	–	6–12	12–6	3–6	11–7	3–4	5–2	5–4	2–4	1–9	3–4	11–7
Detroit	5–5	1–5	13–5	12–6	–	11–7	3–4	14–4	4–3	5–5	4–6	6–1	6–3	4–2	7–11
Kansas City	4–5	3–5	11–7	6–12	7–11	–	7–3	8–10	3–3	4–5	5–3	2–5	2–6	4–3	5–13
Los Angeles	6–3	2–6	6–2	6–3	4–3	3–7	–	6–3	4–5	8–11	12–7	4–4	7–12	5–5	13–5
Minnesota	2–6	2–5	9–9	7–11	4–14	10–8	3–6	–	2–6	4–4	3–5	3–7	5–3	1–5	8–10
New York	13–5	6–12	6–2	4–3	3–4	3–3	5–4	6–2	–	6–3	5–4	9–9	7–2	11–7	13–5
Oakland	5–4	2–6	4–6	2–5	5–5	5–4	11–8	4–4	3–6	–	9–10	5–2	6–13	5–5	8–10
Seattle	2–4	4–5	2–7	4–5	6–4	3–5	7–12	5–3	4–5	10–9	–	4–6	4–15	3–6	9–9
Tampa Bay	9–9	12–6	4–4	4–2	1–6	5–2	4–4	7–3	9–9	2–5	6–4	–	4–5	12–6	12–6
Texas	5–1	6–4	4–4	9–1	3–6	6–2	12–7	3–5	2–7	13–6	15–4	5–4	–	4–6	9–9
Toronto	12–6	8–10	4–3	4–3	2–4	3–4	5–5	5–1	7–11	5–5	6–3	6–12	6–4	–	8–10

- Source: MLB Standings Grid – 2011

=== Roster ===
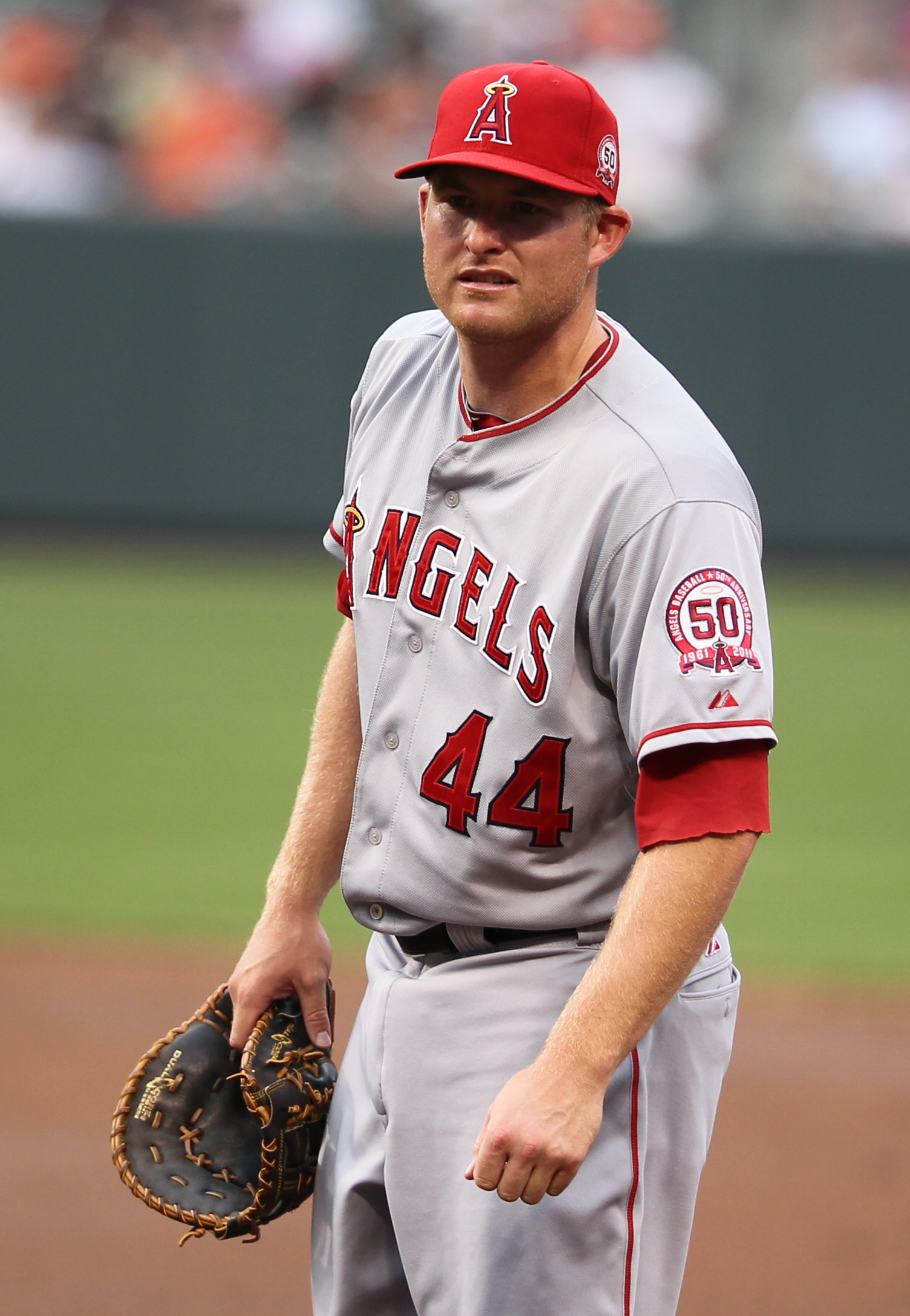
Mark Trumbo in July 2011.

2011 Los Angeles Angels
Roster
Pitchers: 22 Trevor Bell; 17 Jason Bulger; 38 Bobby Cassevah; 52 Tyler Chatwood; 37 Scott Downs; 24 Dan Haren; 40 Kevin Jepsen; 19 Scott Kazmir; 58 Michael Kohn; 32 Matt Palmer; 35 Joel Piñeiro; 49 Horacio Ramírez; 43 Garrett Richards; 56 Fernando Rodney; 45 Francisco Rodríguez; 54 Ervin Santana; 21 Hisanori Takahashi; 63 Rich Thompson; 51 Jordan Walden; 36 Jered Weaver; 57 Jerome Williams	Catchers: 16 Hank Conger; 5 Jeff Mathis; 46 Bobby Wilson; Infielders: 4,28 Alexi Amarista; 2 Erick Aybar; 39 Russell Branyan; 6 Alberto Callaspo; 13 Maicer Izturis; 47 Howard Kendrick; 19 Efren Navarro; 73 Andrew Romine; 44 Mark Trumbo; 3 Gil Velazquez; 3 Brandon Wood	Outfielders: 53 Bobby Abreu; 25 Peter Bourjos; 48 Torii Hunter; 55 Jeremy Moore; 27 Mike Trout; 10 Vernon Wells; 77 Reggie Willits; Other: 33 Chris Pettit	Manager: 14 Mike Scioscia; Coaches: 23 Mike Butcher (pitching); 12 Dino Ebel (third base); 60 Tom Gregorio (bullpen catcher); 4 Alfredo Griffin (first base); 7 Mickey Hatcher (hitting); 9 Rob Picciolo (bench); 61 Steve Soliz (bullpen)

== Player statistics ==
=== Hitting statistics ===
Note: Pos = Position; G = Games played; AB = At bats; R = Runs; H = Hits; 2B = Doubles; 3B = Triples; HR = Home runs; RBI = Runs batted in; TB = Total bases; BB = Base on balls; SO = Strikeouts; SB = Stolen bases; CS = Caught Stealing; OBP = On base percentage; SLG = Slugging; AVG = Batting average
‡Traded/Released/DFA mid-season.

Player	Pos	G	AB	R	H	2B	3B	HR	RBI	TB	BB	SO	SB	CS	OBP	SLG	AVG
Bobby Abreu	DH	142	502	54	127	30	1	8	60	183	78	113	21	5	.353	.365	.253
Alexi Amarista	2B	23	52	2	8	3	1	0	5	13	2	8	0	0	.182	.250	.154
Erick Aybar	SS	143	556	71	155	33	8	10	59	234	31	68	30	6	.322	.421	.279
Peter Bourjos	OF	147	502	72	136	26	11	12	43	220	32	124	22	9	.327	.438	.271
Russell Branyan	DH	37	65	7	12	2	0	4	12	26	11	21	2	0	.299	.400	.185
Alberto Callaspo	3B	141	475	54	137	23	0	6	46	178	58	48	8	1	.366	.375	.288
Hank Conger	C	59	177	14	37	8	0	6	19	63	17	37	0	0	.282	.356	.209
Torii Hunter	OF	156	580	80	152	24	2	23	82	249	62	125	5	7	.336	.429	.262
Maicer Izturis	SS	122	449	51	124	35	0	5	38	174	33	65	9	6	.334	.388	.276
Howie Kendrick	2B	140	537	86	153	30	6	18	63	249	33	119	14	6	.338	.464	.285
Jeff Mathis	C	93	247	18	43	12	0	3	22	64	15	75	1	2	.225	.259	.174
Jeremy Moore	OF	8	8	3	1	0	0	0	0	0	0	2	0	0	.125	.125	.125
Efren Navarro	1B	12	10	1	2	1	0	0	0	3	1	1	0	0	.273	.300	.200
Chris Pettit	-	1	0	0	0	0	0	0	0	0	0	0	0	0	.000	.000	.000
Andrew Romine	IF	10	16	2	2	0	0	0	0	2	1	6	1	0	.176	.125	.125
Mike Trout	OF	40	123	20	27	6	0	5	16	48	9	30	4	0	.281	.390	.220
Mark Trumbo	1B	149	539	65	137	31	1	29	87	257	25	120	9	4	.291	.477	.254
Gil Velazquez	IF	4	6	0	3	0	0	0	1	3	0	0	0	0	.429	.500	.500
Vernon Wells	OF	131	505	60	110	15	4	25	66	208	20	86	9	4	.248	.412	.218
Reggie Willits	OF	22	22	0	1	1	0	0	1	2	4	7	0	0	.192	.091	.045
Bobby Wilson	C	57	111	5	21	8	0	1	8	32	10	16	0	2	.252	.288	.189
Brandon Wood‡	SS	6	14	1	2	1	0	0	0	3	0	8	0	0	.143	.214	.143
Pitcher totals		162	17	1	4	0	0	0	1	4	0	7	0	0	.235	.235	.235
Team totals		162	5513	667	1394	289	34	155	629	2216	442	1086	135	52	.313	.402	.253

=== Pitching statistics ===
Note: W = Wins; L = Losses; ERA = Earned run average; G = Games played; GS = Games started; CG = Complete games; SHO = Shutouts; SV = Saves; SVO = Save opportunities; IP = Innings pitched; H = Hits allowed; R = Runs allowed; ER = Earned runs allowed; HR = Home runs allowed; HBP = Hit by pitch; BB = Base on balls issued; SO = Strikeouts

Player	W	L	ERA	G	GS	CG	SHO	SV	SVO	IP	H	R	ER	HR	HBP	BB	SO
Trevor Bell	1	1	3.41	19	0	0	0	0	1	34.1	39	14	13	2	1	10	17
Jason Bulger	0	1	0.96	5	0	0	0	0	0	9.1	6	4	1	2	0	10	7
Bobby Cassevah	1	1	2.72	30	0	0	0	0	1	39.2	28	12	12	1	1	19	24
Tyler Chatwood	6	11	4.75	27	25	0	0	0	0	142.0	166	81	75	14	6	71	74
Scott Downs	6	3	1.34	60	0	0	0	1	4	53.2	39	11	8	3	0	15	35
Dan Haren	16	10	3.17	35	34	4	3	0	0	238.1	211	91	84	20	5	33	192
Kevin Jepsen	1	2	7.62	16	0	0	0	0	1	13.0	21	11	11	2	1	9	6
Scott Kazmir	0	0	27.00	1	1	0	0	0	0	1.2	5	5	5	1	2	2	0
Michael Kohn	0	1	7.30	14	0	0	0	1	2	12.1	14	10	10	6	1	9	9
Matt Palmer	1	1	5.74	3	3	0	0	0	0	15.2	19	11	10	0	1	4	7
Joel Piñeiro	7	7	5.13	27	24	2	0	0	0	145.2	182	90	83	16	2	38	62
Horacio Ramírez	1	0	6.00	12	0	3	0	0	0	9.0	16	7	6	1	0	2	4
Garrett Richards	0	2	5.79	7	3	2	0	0	0	14.0	16	11	9	4	0	7	9
Fernando Rodney	3	5	4.50	39	0	0	0	3	7	32.0	26	18	16	1	3	28	26
Francisco Rodríguez	0	0	4.61	10	0	0	0	0	0	13.2	13	7	7	2	0	5	7
Ervin Santana	11	12	3.38	33	33	4	1	0	0	228.2	207	95	86	26	8	72	178
Hisanori Takahashi	4	3	3.44	61	0	0	0	2	5	68.0	58	30	26	7	0	25	52
Rich Thompson	1	3	3.00	44	0	0	0	0	1	54.0	46	18	18	5	0	20	56
Jordan Walden	5	5	2.98	62	0	0	0	32	42	60.1	49	22	20	3	1	26	67
Jered Weaver	18	8	2.41	33	33	4	2	0	0	235.2	182	65	63	20	3	56	198
Jerome Williams	4	0	3.68	10	6	0	0	0	0	44.0	45	20	18	6	1	15	28
Team totals	86	76	3.57	162	162	12	6	39	64	1465.0	1388	633	581	142	36	476	1058

== Farm system ==
Level	Team	League	Manager
AAA	Salt Lake Bees	Pacific Coast League	Keith Johnson
AA	Arkansas Travelers	Texas League	Bill Mosiello and Bobby Mitchell
A	Inland Empire 66ers	California League	Tom Gamboa
A	Cedar Rapids Kernels	Midwest League	Brent Del Chiaro
Rookie	AZL Angels	Arizona League	Tyrone Boykin
Rookie	Orem Owlz	Pioneer League	Tom Kotchman

Records
Preceded by 2010	Los Angeles Angels seasons 2011	Succeeded by 2012
