= Chris Pettit =

American baseball player (born 1984)

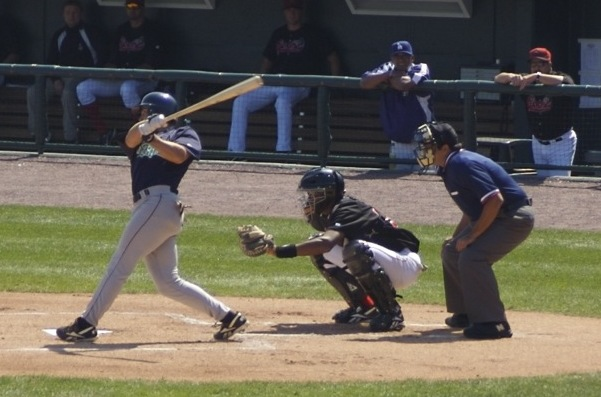
- Pettit (left) with the Cedar Rapids Kernels in 2007
- Outfielder
- Born: August 15, 1984 (age 41); Pasadena, California
- Batted: Right Threw: Right

MLB debut
- September 11, 2009, for the Los Angeles Angels of Anaheim

Last MLB appearance
- April 8, 2011, for the Los Angeles Angels of Anaheim

MLB statistics
- Batting average: .286
- Home runs: 0
- Runs batted in: 0
- Stats at Baseball Reference

Teams
- Los Angeles Angels of Anaheim (2009, 2011)

Christopher Michael Pettit (born August 15, 1984) is an American former professional baseball outfielder who played in Major League Baseball (MLB) for the Los Angeles Angels of Anaheim in 2009 and 2011.

== Amateur career ==
Pettit was born in Pasadena, California. He attended San Dimas High School, from which he graduated in 2002, after being named both 2002 Male Scholar-Athlete of the Year and Best Body (male).

He attended Loyola Marymount University, and in 2005 he played collegiate summer baseball with the Orleans Cardinals of the Cape Cod Baseball League.

== Professional career ==
=== Los Angeles Angels of Anaheim ===
Pettit was selected by the Los Angeles Angels of Anaheim in the 19th round (582nd overall) of the 2006 Major League Baseball draft. In September 2009, he was called up to the Los Angeles Angels and made his major league debut. In his first major league at bat, Pettit singled in the seventh inning, and later scored on a Howie Kendrick double. He appeared in 10 games for the Angels in 2009, and had 2 hits in 7 at-bats.

Pettit missed the entire 2010 season following shoulder surgery. In 2011, he appeared in only one game in the majors, appearing as a pinch runner on April 8 against the Toronto Blue Jays. He spent the rest of the season split between the Salt Lake Bees and the Arkansas Travelers, where he hit a combined .182 in 124 games. On January 20, 2012, he was released.

=== Seattle Mariners ===
On January 31, 2012, Pettit signed a minor league contract with the Los Angeles Dodgers. He was released on March 29. He later signed with the Bridgeport Bluefish of the Atlantic league of professional baseball, before signing a minor league contract with the Seattle Mariners on April 20. In 63 games for the Double-A Jackson Generals, he batted .279/.362/.447 with four home runs, 26 RBI, and seven stolen bases. Pettit was released by the Mariners organization on July 17.

=== Colorado Rockies ===
On July 23, 2012, Pettit signed a minor league contract with the Colorado Rockies organization. He hit .293 with three home runs and eight RBI in 19 games for the Double-A Tulsa Drillers, and hit .278 with one RBI in six games for the Triple-A Colorado Springs SkySox. Pettit elected free agency on November 2.

=== Tigres de Quintana Roo ===
On January 30, 2013, Pettit signed a minor league contract with the Baltimore Orioles. He was released prior to the start of the season on March 29.

On April 23, 2013, Pettit signed with the Tigres de Quintana Roo of the Mexican League. In 21 games for Quintana Roo, he slashed .317/.438/.430 with one home run, 10 RBI, and four stolen bases.

=== Minnesota Twins ===
On May 20, 2013, Pettit signed a minor league contract with the Minnesota Twins. In 18 games for the Double-A New Britain Rock Cats, he batted .129/.214/.194 with no home runs and five RBI. Pettit was released by the Twins organization on June 14.

=== Baltimore Orioles ===
On June 18, 2013, Pettit signed a minor league contract with the Baltimore Orioles. In 29 games for the Double-A Bowie Baysox, he slashed .125/.253/.219 with one home run and five RBI. Pettit was released by the Orioles organization on August 4.
