= Tyler Chatwood =

American baseball player (born 1989)

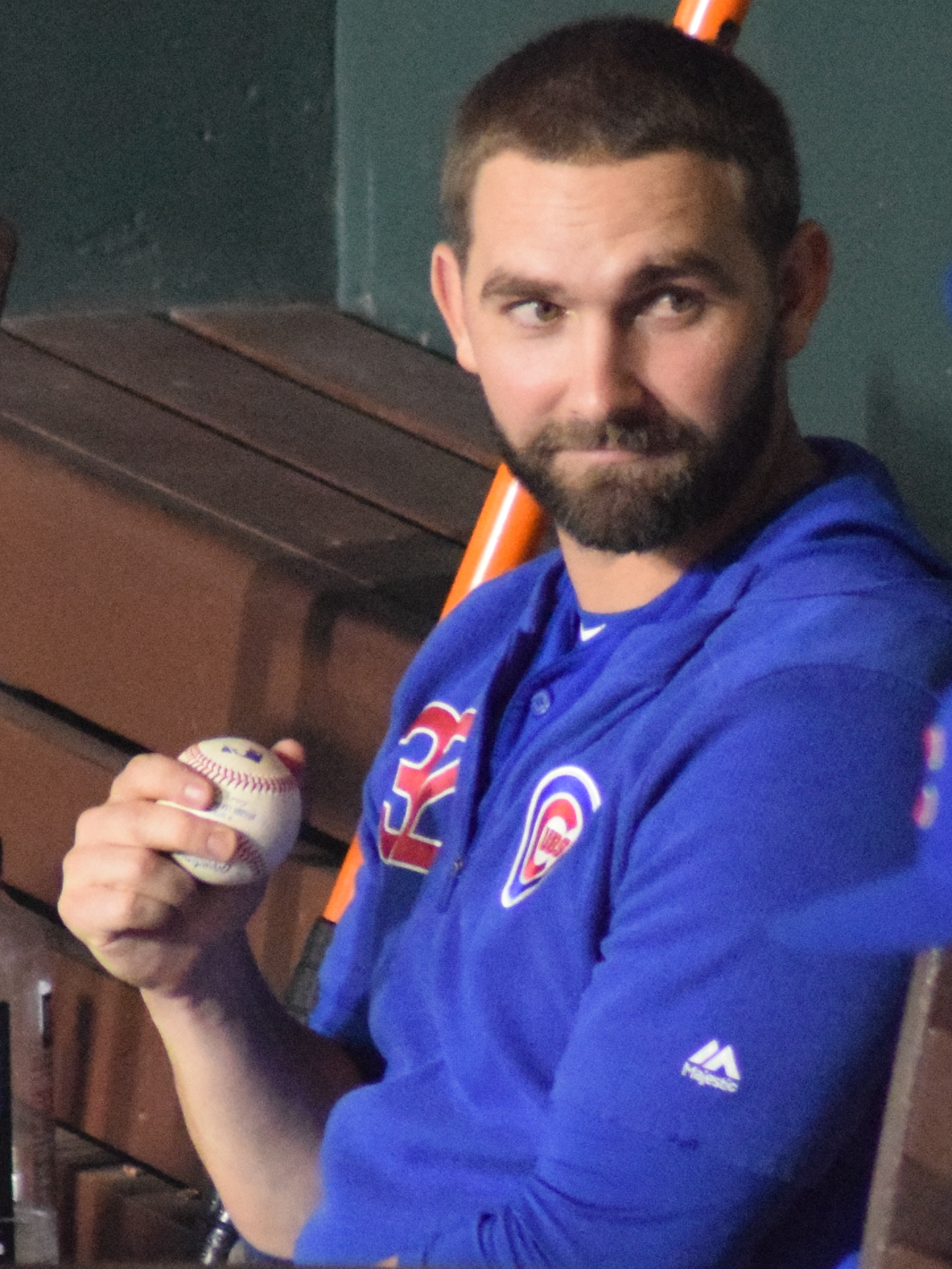
- Chatwood with Chicago Cubs in 2019
- Pitcher
- Born: December 16, 1989 (age 36); Redlands, California, U.S.
- Batted: Right Threw: Right

MLB debut
- April 11, 2011, for the Los Angeles Angels of Anaheim

Last MLB appearance
- August 24, 2021, for the San Francisco Giants

MLB statistics
- Win–loss record: 52–60
- Earned run average: 4.45
- Strikeouts: 660
- Stats at Baseball Reference

Teams
- Los Angeles Angels of Anaheim (2011); Colorado Rockies (2012–2014, 2016–2017); Chicago Cubs (2018–2020); Toronto Blue Jays (2021); San Francisco Giants (2021)

Tyler Cole Chatwood (born December 16, 1989) is an American former professional baseball pitcher. He has previously played in Major League Baseball (MLB) for the Los Angeles Angels, Colorado Rockies, Chicago Cubs, Toronto Blue Jays, and San Francisco Giants. The Angels selected Chatwood in the second round of the 2008 Major League Baseball draft.

== Professional career ==
=== Los Angeles Angels of Anaheim ===
The Los Angeles Angels of Anaheim selected Chatwood in the second round of the 2008 Major League Baseball draft out of Redlands East Valley High School.

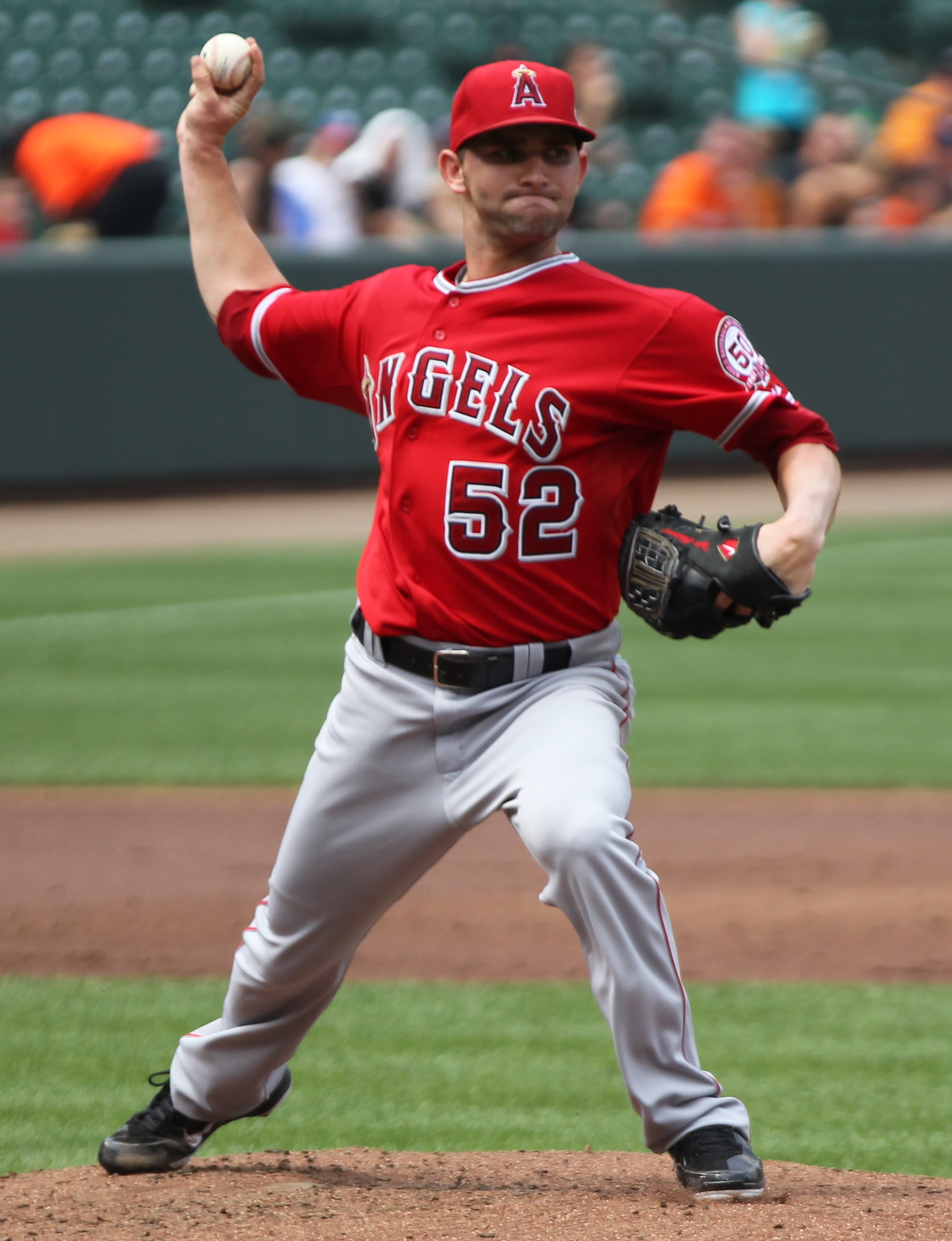
Chatwood pitching for the Los Angeles Angels of Anaheim in 2011

Chatwood made his major league debut on April 11, 2011, in a loss against the Cleveland Indians where he went five innings, giving up four runs on four hits with three strikeouts and four walks. In his second start against the Chicago White Sox he earned his first major league win, pitching seven innings, only giving up one run on five hits and two walks while striking out three. Chatwood remained in the rotation for most of the season, making 25 starts for the Angels. His hits allowed and inability to control his pitches led to him finishing with an ERA of 4.75 and a 6–11 record.

=== Colorado Rockies ===
On November 30, 2011, Chatwood was traded to the Colorado Rockies for catcher Chris Iannetta. Chatwood began the 2012 season in the Rockies bullpen, appearing in four games while recording one save. At the beginning of August, Chatwood was inserted in the rotation. He finished with a record of 5–6 with a 5.43 ERA in 19 games (12 starts).

In 2013, Chatwood had his best season despite missing half the season because of injury. Chatwood made 20 starts, going 8–5 with a 3.15 ERA and inducing an over 50% groundball rate for the Rockies.

In July 2014, Chatwood underwent Tommy John surgery to repair the ulnar collateral ligament of the elbow in his pitching arm, ending his season after just four starts. He signed a two-year, $2 million extension with the Rockies on January 14, 2015.

After sitting out the entire 2015 season to recover from Tommy John surgery, Chatwood came back healthy in 2016. He made 27 starts in 2016, posting a 12–9 record with a 3.87 ERA over 158 innings. Despite his struggles at Coors Field in 2016 (6.12 ERA over 78 innings), Chatwood led all qualified pitchers in road ERA, he finished 2016, with a 1.69 road ERA over 80 innings and an 8–1 road record.

In January 2017, Chatwood and the Rockies avoided arbitration. The two sides settled on a one-year deal for $4.4 million for the 2017 season. On April 15, 2017, Chatwood retired the first 17 batters until giving up a single by Chris Marrero. Chatwood helped his own cause with a two-run single, and pitched a complete game as the Rockies shut out the San Francisco Giants 5–0.

=== Chicago Cubs ===
On December 7, 2017, Chatwood signed a three-year, $38 million contract with the Chicago Cubs. On April 29, 2018, Chatwood hit an RBI single, scoring Addison Russell, for his first hit as a Chicago Cub.

Chatwood began the 2018 season in Chicago's starting rotation, but after compiling a 4.98 ERA with 84 walks in 95 innings and the Cubs acquisition of Cole Hamels, he was moved to the bullpen. He finished the season 4–6 with a 5.30 ERA over 24 games (twenty starts). In 2019, he moved to the bullpen nearly full-time, going 5–3 with a 3.76 ERA over 38 games (five starts), striking out 74 batters over 76 2/3 innings.

In 2020, Chatwood pitched to a 5.30 ERA with 25 strikeouts over 18 2/3 innings pitched in 5 games.

=== Toronto Blue Jays ===
On January 21, 2021, Chatwood signed a one-year, $3 million contract with the Blue Jays. He made his Jays debut on April 1 against the New York Yankees on Opening Day, tossing a scoreless sixth inning on relief of Hyun-Jin Ryu. On July 30, 2021, Chatwood was designated for assignment to make room for newly acquired José Berríos on the 40-man roster. On July 31, 2021, Chatwood was released by the Blue Jays.

=== San Francisco Giants ===
On August 7, 2021, Chatwood signed a minor league contract with the San Francisco Giants. On August 17, he was selected to the active roster. Chatwood made 2 appearances for the Giants, giving up 3 runs through 4 innings pitched, while striking out 6. On August 29, Chatwood was designated for assignment by the Giants.

=== Fukuoka SoftBank Hawks ===
On January 1, 2022, Chatwood signed with the Fukuoka SoftBank Hawks of Nippon Professional Baseball. On June 20, Chatwood underwent shoulder surgery, ending his season without having appeared for the Hawks. He was released on July 12, 2022.

=== Pittsburgh Pirates ===
On December 21, 2022, it was announced that Chatwood had signed a minor league contract with the Pittsburgh Pirates. He made two scoreless appearances for the Triple–A Indianapolis Indians, as well as seven appearances for the Single–A Bradenton Marauders while on rehab assignment. Chatwood was released by the Pirates organization on June 15, 2023.

=== Arizona Diamondbacks ===
On August 7, 2023, Chatwood signed a minor league contract with the Arizona Diamondbacks organization. Chatwood posted a 1.69 ERA in 5 appearances for the Triple–A Reno Aces before he was released on August 26.

On April 9, 2024, Chatwood re–joined the Diamondbacks organization on a new minor league deal. He made three appearances split between Reno and the rookie–level Arizona Complex League Diamondbacks, struggling to a 22.50 ERA with one strikeout across two innings pitched. On May 31, Chatwood was released by Arizona.

== Scouting report ==
Chatwood is a ground ball pitcher who features a two-seam fastball (93–98 mph), cutter (87–89 mph), curveball (78–80 mph) and changeup (86–88 mph).

== Personal life ==
Chatwood and his wife welcomed their first child, a son named Owen, in June 2018.

== See also ==
- List of baseball players who underwent Tommy John surgery
