= Howie Kendrick =

American baseball player (born 1983)

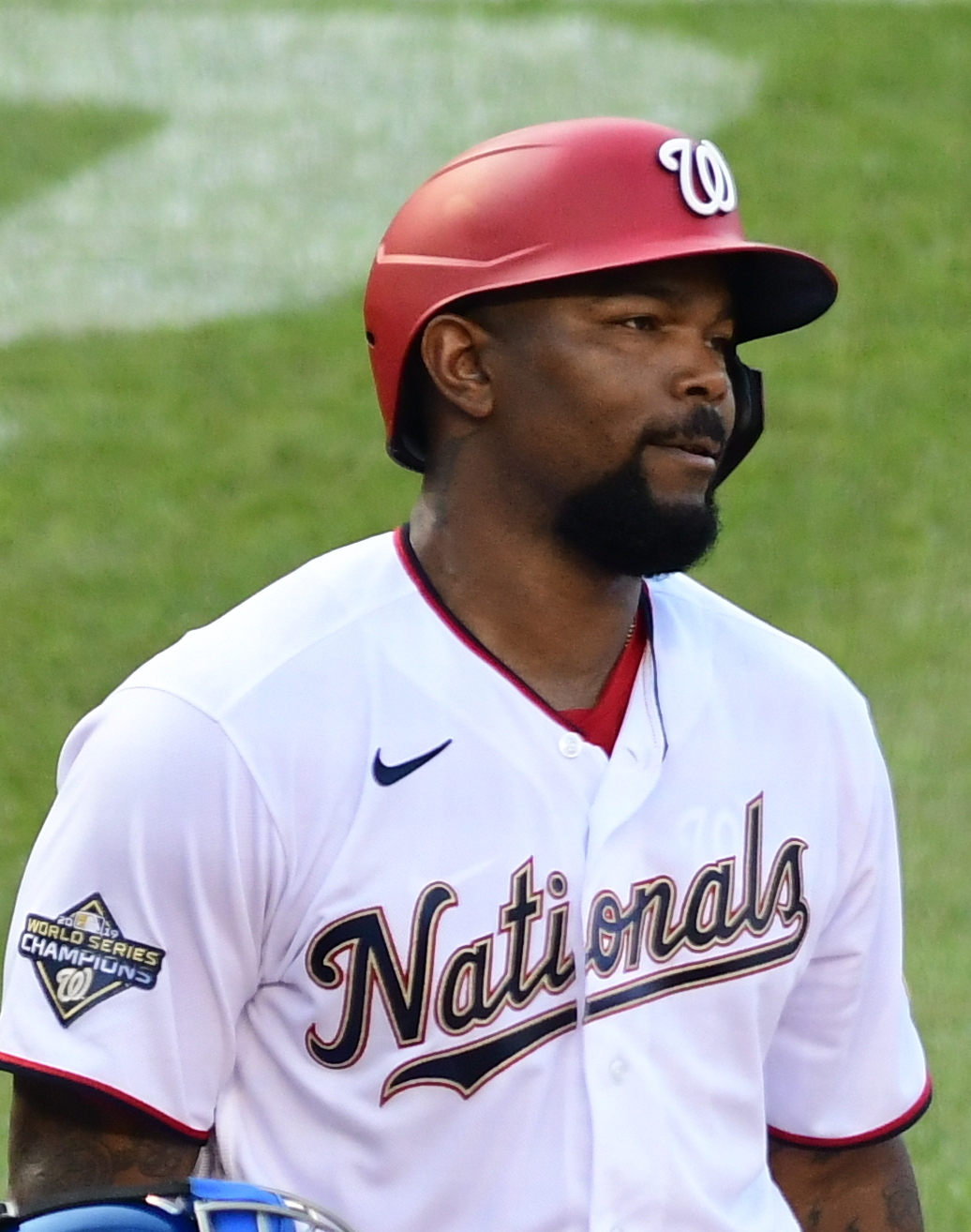
- Kendrick with the Nationals in 2020
- Second baseman
- Born: July 12, 1983 (age 43); Jacksonville, Florida, U.S.
- Batted: Right Threw: Right

MLB debut
- April 26, 2006, for the Los Angeles Angels of Anaheim

Last MLB appearance
- September 5, 2020, for the Washington Nationals

MLB statistics
- Batting average: .294
- Home runs: 127
- Runs batted in: 724
- Stats at Baseball Reference

Teams
- Los Angeles Angels of Anaheim (2006–2014); Los Angeles Dodgers (2015–2016); Philadelphia Phillies (2017); Washington Nationals (2017–2020)

Career highlights and awards
- All-Star (2011); World Series champion (2019); NLCS MVP (2019)

Howard Joseph Kendrick III (born July 12, 1983) is an American former professional baseball infielder and current special assistant to the general manager for the Philadelphia Phillies of Major League Baseball (MLB). The Anaheim Angels selected Kendrick in the tenth round of the 2002 Major League Baseball draft. He made his MLB debut in 2006, and played in MLB for the Angels, Los Angeles Dodgers, Phillies, and Washington Nationals. With the Nationals, Kendrick was a key part of their 2019 World Series run, being named the MVP of the 2019 National League Championship Series and hitting the go-ahead two-run home run in game seven of the World Series. In 2011, he appeared in the MLB All-Star Game. While primarily a second baseman throughout his career, he has also played first base and left field.

== Early life ==
Kendrick and his two sisters, Christina and Michelle, were raised by their grandmother in Callahan, Florida while their mother, Belinda, served in the US Army. When Kendrick was 12 years old, he began living with his mother. Kendrick eventually found that he and his mother "didn't get along very well" and moved in with another family.

Kendrick attended West Nassau High School in Callahan. He was an undersized high schooler at 5 feet 7 inches (1.70 m) and 110 pounds (50 kg) and did not have the benefit of being able to play travel ball. He played before recruiters from several colleges but received no interest until he enrolled at St. Johns River Community College in Palatka, Florida, where he was named Conference Player of the Year. It was by chance that Angels scout Tom Kotchman discovered him there in 2002. "My goodness, the kid hit the ball," he recalled. "I couldn't believe there weren't other scouts there. And other JCs cut this guy? What were they thinking?"

== Professional career ==
=== Los Angeles Angels of Anaheim ===
The Anaheim Angels selected Kendrick in the tenth round of the 2002 Major League Baseball draft. Baseball America named him the best prospect in the Texas League in 2005, calling him "the clear standout" in a league that also featured Kendrys Morales, Erick Aybar, and Andre Ethier. He was named the 12th top prospect by Baseball America in 2006.

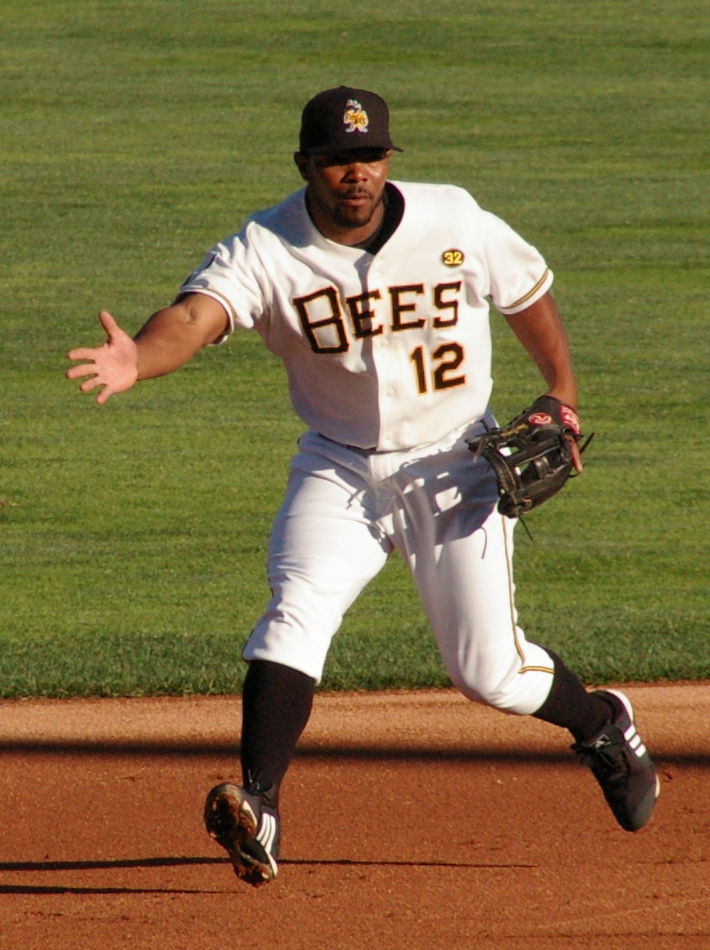
Kendrick playing for the Salt Lake Bees in 2009

Kendrick made his MLB debut on April 26, 2006, as the starting second baseman for the Angels against the Detroit Tigers. He was hitless in four at-bats in the game. His first hit was a line drive single to center off Barry Zito of the Oakland Athletics in his next start, on May 1. Kendrick hit his first home run against Shawn Camp of the Tampa Bay Devil Rays on July 26. He hit .285 with 4 homers and 30 RBIs in 72 games during that season.

Kendrick had a one-on-one collision with actor Ben Affleck during his rookie season in the stands on the first base side of Fenway Park. On a foul ball that was hit towards where Affleck was sitting, Kendrick beat Affleck to the ball, recording the out. Fans sitting nearby booed Affleck for not taking the ball away from Kendrick. The event landed Kendrick's picture in People magazine. In an edition of the syndicated Access Hollywood, Kendrick presented Affleck an autographed baseball for his birthday.

After the incumbent starter, Adam Kennedy, signed as a free agent with the St. Louis Cardinals during the 2006-2007 offseason, Kendrick became the Angels starting second baseman for 2007. He batted .322 in 88 games and again batted over .300 in 2008.

Kendrick struggled in the first half of the 2009 season, batting only .239 with 4 homers, and was optioned to the minors. After returning from the minors, Kendrick hit extremely well, batting .358 in the second half with a .558 slugging percentage.

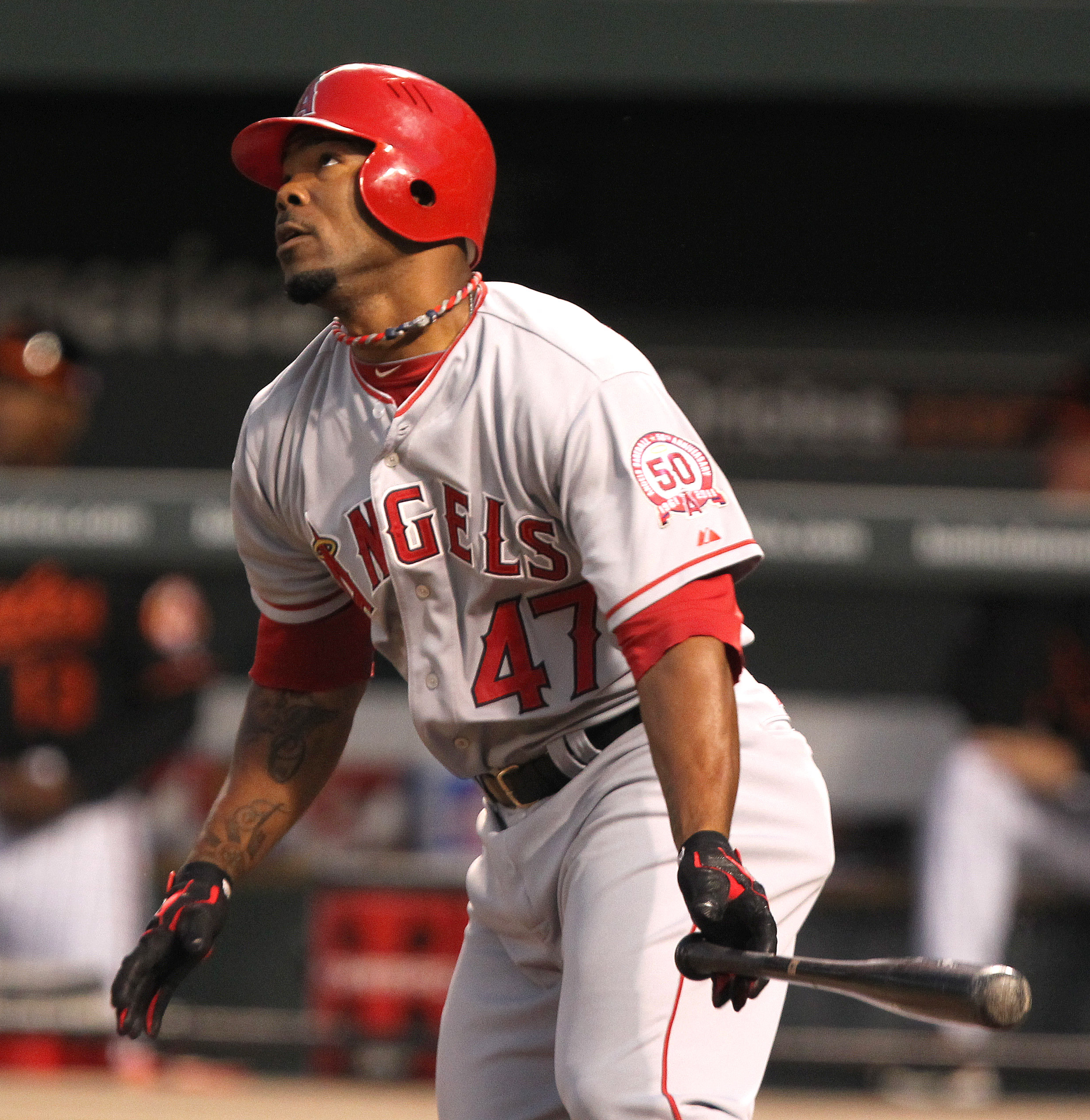
Kendrick with the Los Angeles Angels in 2011

Kendrick extended his positional versatility in the 2011 season, seeing time at first base and left field in addition to his usual place at second base. In 2011, Kendrick was selected to serve as an American League reserve in the 2011 All-Star Game. He joined teammates Jered Weaver, and Jordan Walden as the Angels' representatives in Phoenix, Arizona. Through the All-Star break on July 10, Kendrick was hitting .302/.360/.462 with 8 home runs, 9 stolen bases, and 29 RBIs in 301 at-bats.

On January 7, 2012, Kendrick agreed to a new four-year contract worth $33.5 million, making him the Angels' second baseman through the 2015 season. Kendrick had a strong 2012 season, batting .287 with 8 home runs and 67 RBIs.

On July 30, 2013, Kendrick got his 1,000th career hit in a game versus the Texas Rangers. Kendrick would improve on his 2012 campaign with an even stronger 2013, batting .297 with 13 home runs and 57 RBIs. In 2014, he hit .292 with 7 homers and 75 RBIs.

=== Los Angeles Dodgers ===
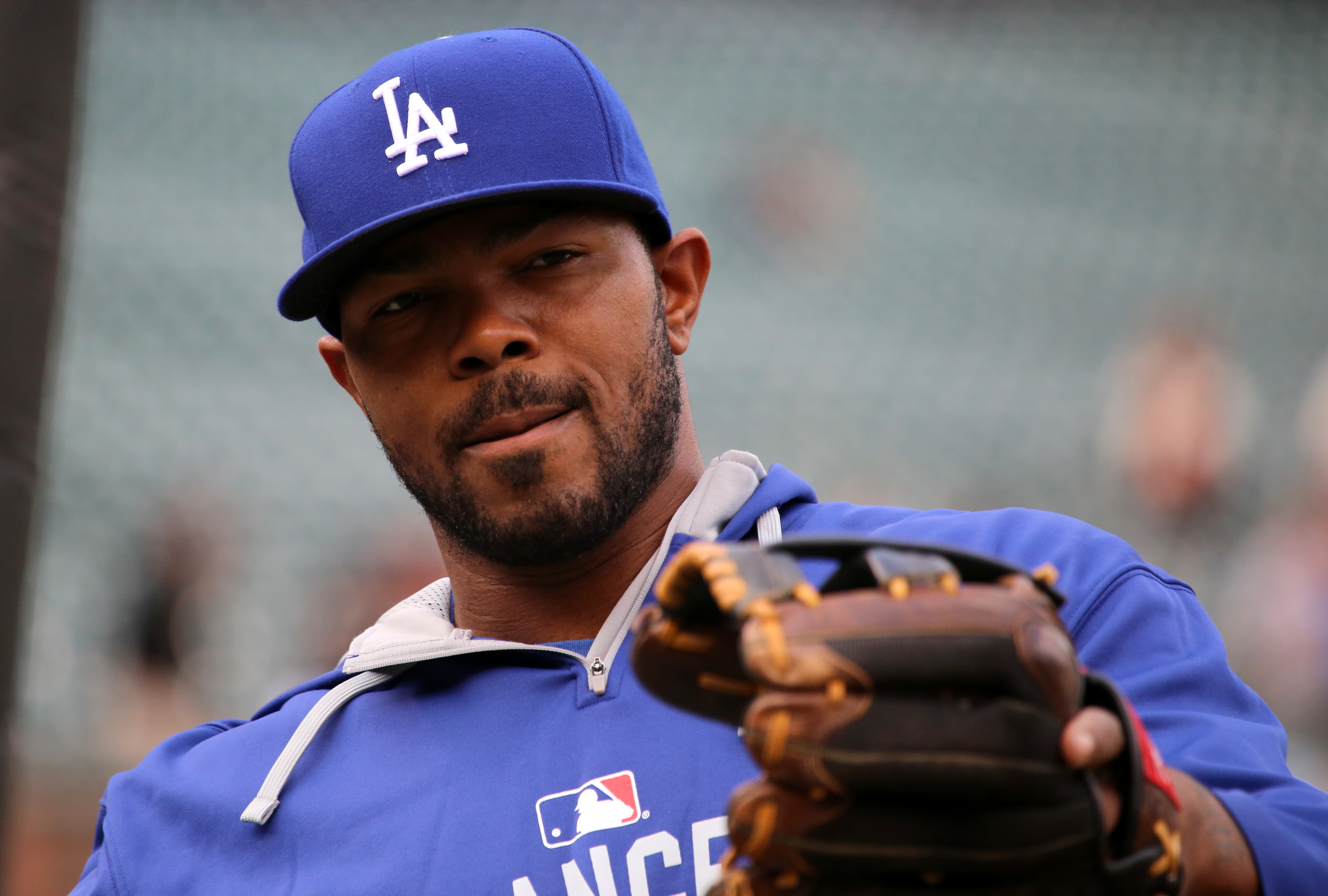
Kendrick with the Los Angeles Dodgers in 2015

On December 10, 2014, the Angels traded Kendrick to the Los Angeles Dodgers in exchange for Andrew Heaney. Kendrick suffered a strained hamstring in a game on August 9 and did not return from the disabled list until September 18, though the injury would continue to bother him for the rest of the season. As a result, he played in only 117 games for the Dodgers (his lowest total since 2009) and hit .295 with 9 homers and 54 RBI. He received a qualifying offer for one year of $15.8 million, but declined it. On February 4, 2016, Kendrick re-signed with the Dodgers on a two-year, $20 million contract. Kendrick and his agent blamed the fact that he declined the qualifying offer and thus would require any team claiming him to give up a draft pick with the lack of interest in him from other teams during his free agency. With Chase Utley getting most of the work at second base, Kendrick played primarily in left field but also saw time at third base and first base in addition to second. He appeared in 146 games and hit .255/.326/.366 with eight homers and 40 RBI. For the season, he had the highest ground ball percentage (61.0%), and the lowest fly ball percentage (19.6%), of all major league hitters.

=== Philadelphia Phillies ===
Kendrick was traded to the Philadelphia Phillies for Darin Ruf and Darnell Sweeney on November 11, 2016.

On April 18, 2017, Kendrick was placed on the 10-day disabled list due to a strained right abdomen.

=== Washington Nationals ===
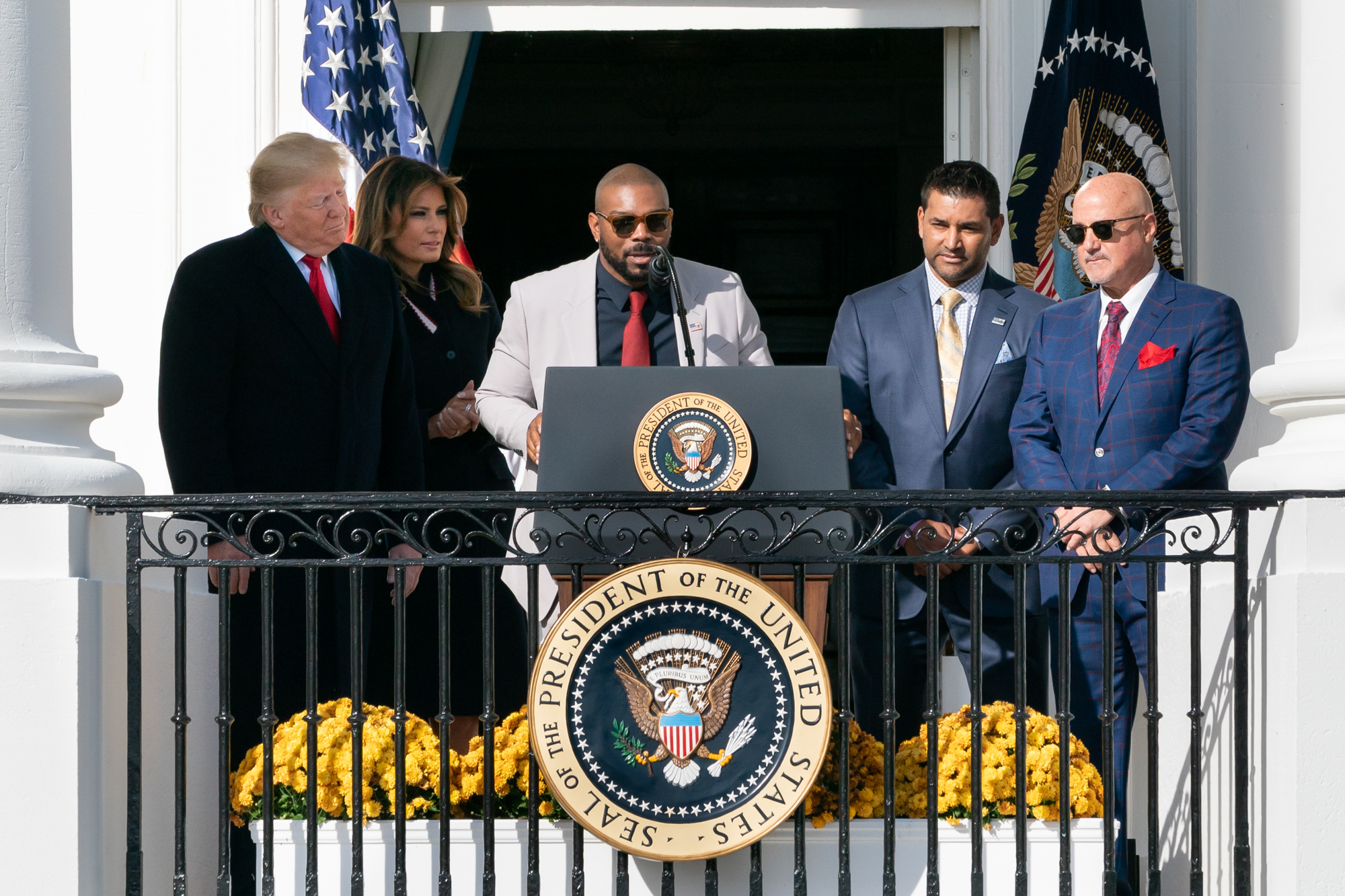
Howie Kendrick delivers remarks at the White House during the celebration for the 2019 World Series Champions.

On July 28, 2017, the Phillies traded Kendrick and cash considerations to the Washington Nationals for McKenzie Mills and international signing bonus money. On August 13, Kendrick hit his first grand slam, a walk-off in the bottom of the 11th, against the San Francisco Giants. He batted .293 that season, finishing with 7 HR and 25 RBI. He primarily played left field.

He re-signed with the Nationals after the season for two years and $7 million plus incentives. On May 19, 2018, Kendrick ruptured his Achilles, ending his season early. He finished the season batting .303 with 4 HR and 12 RBIs.

Kendrick participated in 121 regular season games in 2019, finishing with a batting average of .344 in 330 at bats, alongside 62 RBIs and 17 home runs, second-most of any season in his career. He primarily played first base.

On October 9, 2019, in Game 5 of the National League Division Series, Kendrick hit a grand slam in the 10th inning off Los Angeles Dodgers pitcher Joe Kelly to give the Nationals a 7-3 lead that held up as the final score, advancing the Nationals to the National League Championship Series. It was just the second extra-innings grand slam in MLB postseason history, the other being hit by Nelson Cruz in the 2011 American League Championship Series.

In the National League Championship Series, Kendrick went 5 for 15 with 4 doubles and 4 RBIs in the Nationals' four-game sweep of the St. Louis Cardinals, earning him the National League Championship Series MVP award. Kendrick became just the 21st player to hit four or more doubles in a League Championship Series.

In Game 7 of the 2019 World Series, Kendrick hit a go-ahead home run off Will Harris that struck the screen on the right field foul pole. His efforts paid off as the Nationals won 6-2, giving them their first championship in franchise history. Kendrick won the 2019 Heart and Hustle Award.

Kendrick became a free agent after the 2019 season, but on December 9, 2019, Nationals general manager Mike Rizzo said he had signed a one-year deal worth 6.25 million to stay with the Nationals. Kendrick hit .275/.320/.385 with 2 homers and 11 RBI in 25 games in the pandemic-shortened season, and he became a free agent upon the conclusion of the season.

On December 21, 2020, Kendrick announced his retirement from professional baseball via his Instagram page.

== Post-playing career ==
On November 16, 2021, Kendrick was hired by the Philadelphia Phillies to be a special assistant to General Manager Sam Fuld.

== Personal life ==
Kendrick and his wife Jody married on January 6, 2007. They have two sons and reside in Paradise Valley, Arizona. Kendrick is a vintage watch collector. Kendrick is an avid photographer known for shooting exclusively with Leica cameras.
