= North Caddo High School =

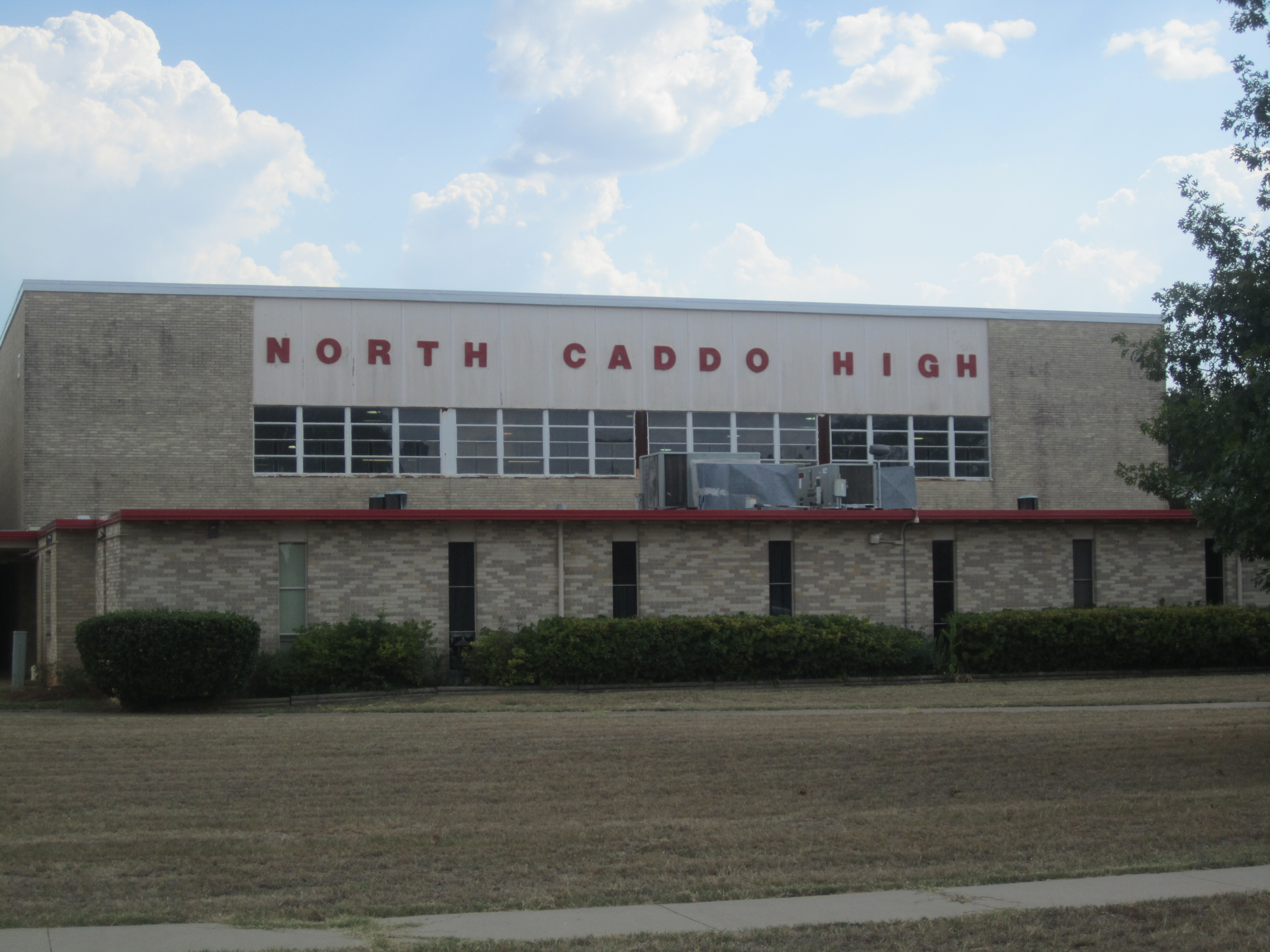

Location
- 201 Airport Drive; Vivian, Louisiana 71082; United States; 32.8610°N 93.9903°W

Information
- Type: Public high school
- Motto: Big Dreams Do Come True!
- Established: 1955
- School district: Caddo Public Schools
- Principal: Annie Cherry
- Teaching staff: 30.52 (FTE)
- Enrollment: 341 (2023-2024)
- Student to teacher ratio: 11.17
- Colors: Red and black
- Nickname: Titans
- Website: northcaddo.caddoschools.org

North Caddo High School is a public high school in Vivian, Louisiana. The school is a part of Caddo Public Schools.

== History ==
Established in 1955, North Caddo High School is home to the Titans. The official school colors are red and black.

== Athletics ==
North Caddo High athletics competes in the LHSAA.

== Notable alumni ==
- Danny McCormick, politician
- Omarion Miller (2023), wide receiver for the Arizona State Sun Devils
- Jeremy Moore, professional baseball player
- Phil Robertson, television personality
- Si Robertson, television personality
- Robert Williams III (2016), professional basketball player

== See also ==
- List of high schools in Louisiana
