= Jeremy Moore (baseball) =

American baseball player (born 1987)

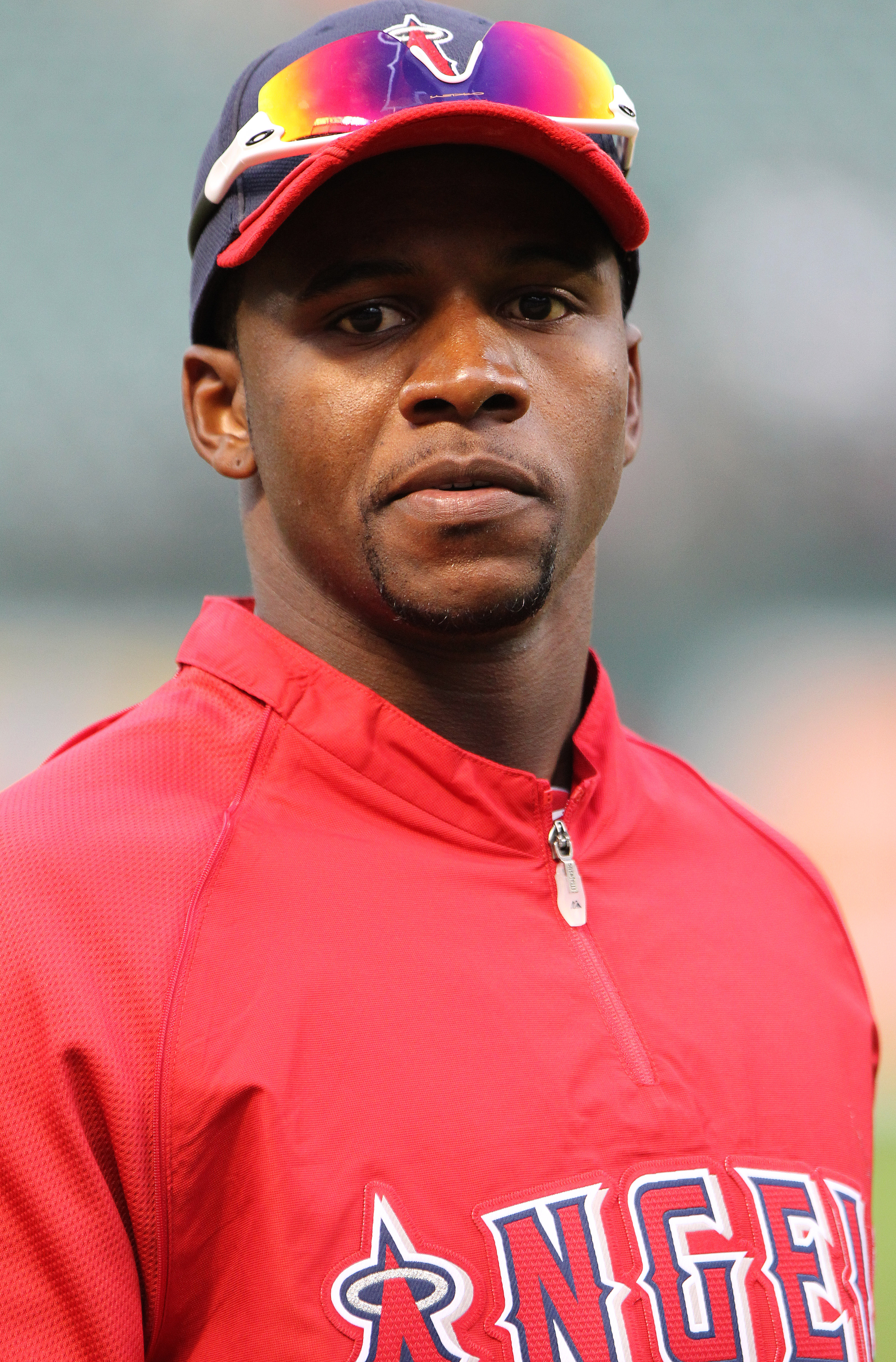
- Moore with the Los Angeles Angels of Anaheim
- Outfielder
- Born: June 29, 1987 (age 38); Shreveport, Louisiana, U.S.
- Batted: Left Threw: Right

MLB debut
- September 2, 2011, for the Los Angeles Angels of Anaheim

Last appearance
- September 28, 2011, for the Los Angeles Angels

MLB statistics
- Batting average: .125
- Home Runs: 0
- Runs Batted In: 0
- Stats at Baseball Reference

Teams
- Los Angeles Angels of Anaheim (2011)

Jeremy Jerome Moore (born June 29, 1987) is an American former professional baseball outfielder and current professional baseball coach in the Texas Rangers organization. He played in Major League Baseball (MLB) for the Los Angeles Angels of Anaheim.

== Professional career ==
=== Los Angeles Angels of Anaheim ===
Moore attended North Caddo High School in Vivian, Louisiana. Moore was drafted by the Los Angeles Angels of Anaheim in the 6th round of the 2005 MLB draft. With the AA Arkansas Travelers in 2010 he hit .303 with 13 homers and 61 RBI and was selected as a Texas League All-Star.

He was called up to the Angels on September 1, 2011 and made his debut as a pinch hitter against the Minnesota Twins on September 2, flying out to left field. He recorded his first Major League hit on a weak single to third off Michael Gonzalez of the Texas Rangers on September 27. It was his only hit in 8 at-bats that season. He subsequently missed the entire 2012 season after undergoing hip surgery.

=== Los Angeles Dodgers ===
He signed as a minor league free agent with the Los Angeles Dodgers on December 27, 2012. He got a late start due to his recovery from injury but eventually reported to the AAA Albuquerque Isotopes. He was later demoted to the AA Chattanooga Lookouts. He played in 80 games combined in the Dodgers minor league system in 2013, and hit only .211 with 7 homers and 31 RBI.

=== Tampa Bay Rays ===
Moore signed a minor league deal with the Tampa Bay Rays in January 2014. He became a free agent after the 2014 season and did not play professionally again.

== Coaching career ==
Moore returned to professional baseball as a coach in 2017 with the Texas Rangers organization. In 2017, he was a coach for the Down East Wood Ducks. In 2018, he was a hitting coach for the AZL Rangers.
