= Gio González =

American baseball player (born 1985)

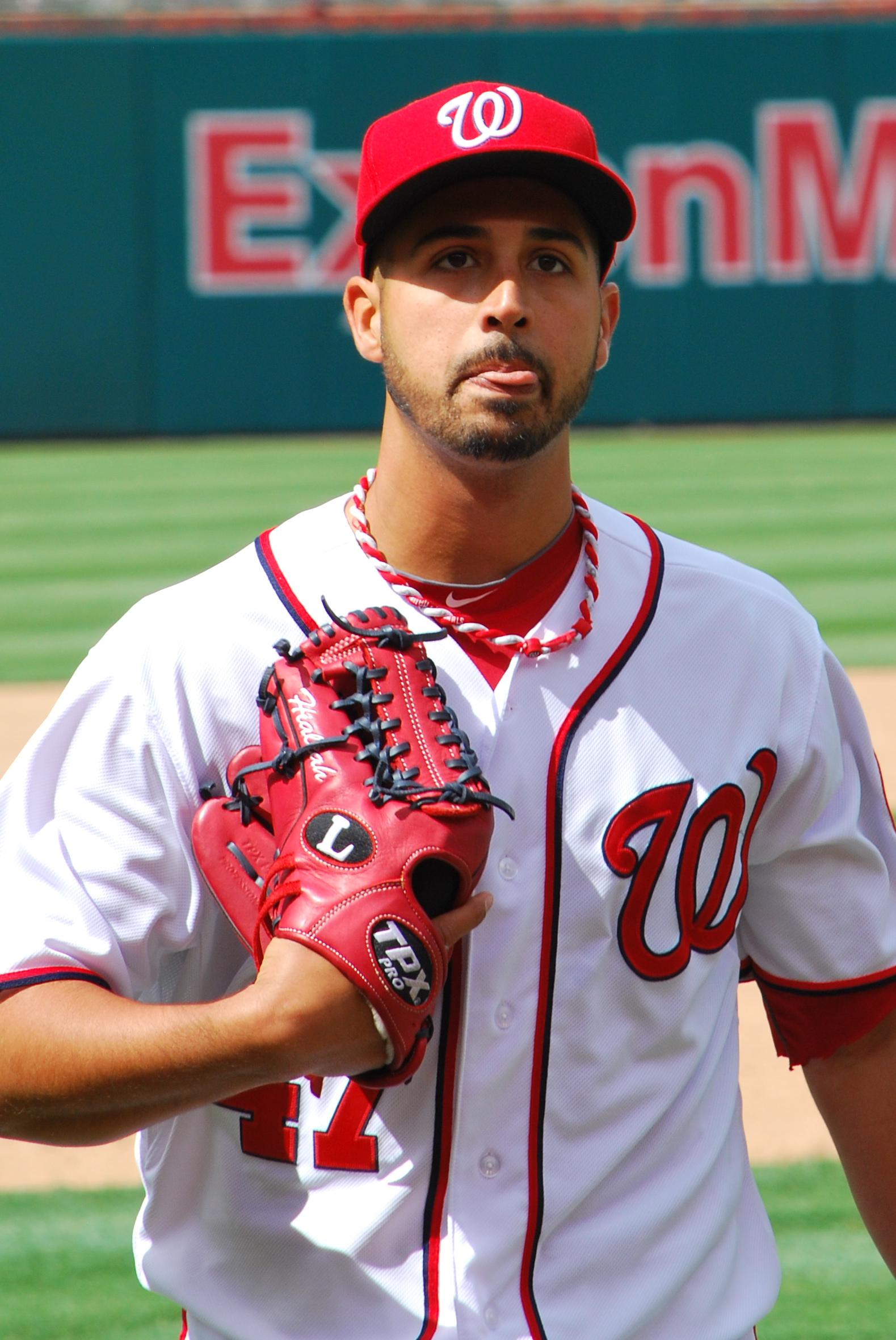
- González with the Nationals in 2012
- Pitcher
- Born: September 19, 1985 (age 41); Hialeah, Florida, U.S.
- Batted: Right Threw: Left

MLB debut
- August 6, 2008, for the Oakland Athletics

Last MLB appearance
- September 27, 2020, for the Chicago White Sox

MLB statistics
- Win–loss record: 131–101
- Earned run average: 3.70
- Strikeouts: 1,860
- Stats at Baseball Reference

Teams
- Oakland Athletics (2008–2011); Washington Nationals (2012–2018); Milwaukee Brewers (2018–2019); Chicago White Sox (2020)

Career highlights and awards
- 2× All-Star (2011, 2012); NL wins leader (2012)

Giovany Aramis González (born September 19, 1985) is an American former professional baseball pitcher. He played in Major League Baseball (MLB) for the Oakland Athletics, Washington Nationals, Milwaukee Brewers and Chicago White Sox. A two-time All-Star, González led the National League in wins and won the Warren Spahn Award in 2012. He is of Cuban descent.

== Early life ==
González was born in Hialeah, Florida, to a Cuban immigrant mother from Havana and a first-generation Cuban-American father from New Jersey. He attended Hialeah High School in Hialeah, for the first three years of his high school career, where they won two state championships and nearly won a third. After his junior year, he transferred over to Monsignor Edward Pace High School in 2004 where he played with future Nationals teammate Chris Marrero.

== Playing career ==
=== Draft and minor leagues ===
The Chicago White Sox selected González in the first round with the 38th overall selection of the 2004 MLB draft.

In 2005, he was traded to the Philadelphia Phillies along with Aaron Rowand and Daniel Haigwood for slugger Jim Thome. While with the Phillies, Baseball America rated González the No. 2 prospect in their farm system behind Cole Hamels in 2006.

In December 2006 he was traded back to the White Sox along with Gavin Floyd for Freddy García. González led the minor leagues with 185 strikeouts in 150 innings in 2007.

=== Oakland Athletics ===
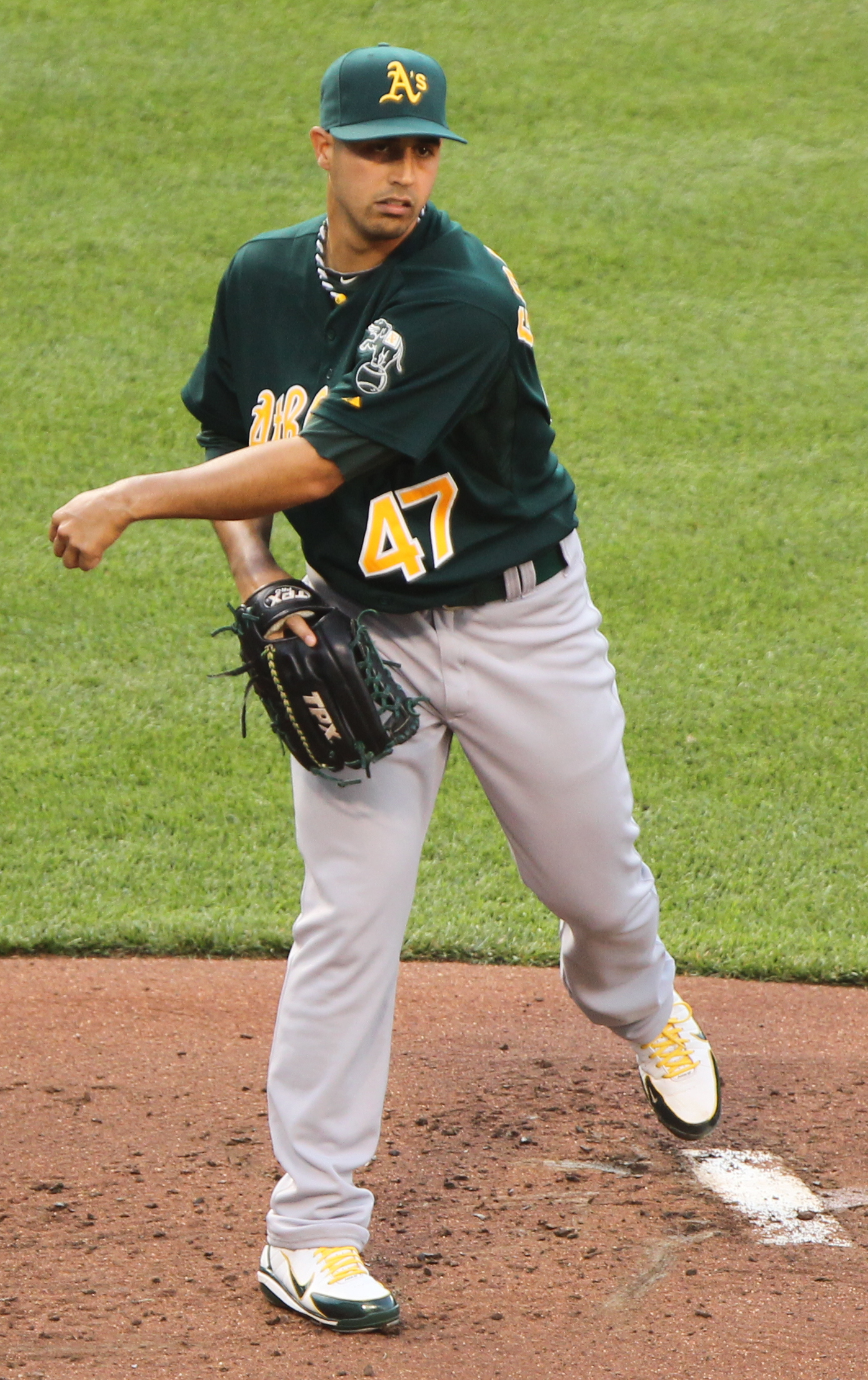
González with the Oakland Athletics in 2011

On January 3, 2008, the White Sox traded González along with fellow prospects Ryan Sweeney and Fautino de los Santos to the Oakland Athletics for Nick Swisher. He was ranked the No. 1 prospect in the White Sox system at the time of the trade.

González was called up to MLB on August 5, 2008, and made his MLB debut on August 6. Following the 2009 spring training camp, he was returned to the Triple-A Sacramento River Cats.

González started the 2010 season throwing 6+ innings against the Los Angeles Angels of Anaheim. He allowed 2 runs on 6 hits, striking out 6 and walking 1 in the 10–4 win.

González was selected to the 2011 MLB All-Star Game. At the 2011 All-Star Game in Phoenix, Arizona, González was called out to the mound with two outs in the bottom of the eighth inning and struck out the only batter he would face, Jay Bruce. On the final day of the 2011 season, González threw 11 strikeouts over eight shut-out innings against the Seattle Mariners to secure a career-high 16 wins for the season.

=== Washington Nationals ===
==== 2012 ====
On December 23, 2011, the Athletics traded González and Robert Gilliam to the Washington Nationals for Brad Peacock, Tommy Milone, Derek Norris and A. J. Cole. On January 15, 2012, González signed a five-year extension worth $42 million through 2016 covering his arbitration-eligible years. The deal also included club options for 2017 and 2018.

González became the first pitcher since 1918 to have three consecutive appearances in which he finished a start with at least six shutout innings and no more than two hits allowed. González set a Nationals record when he pitched 25 consecutive scoreless innings which ended on April 29, 2012. When the 2012 MLB All-Star Game roster was announced on July 1, González found himself on it for the second time in his career. Later that same day, he earned his 11th win on the season after the Nationals topped the Atlanta Braves, 8–4. González would earn one more win in his last start before the All-Star break, pushing his record to 12–3 and lowering his ERA to 2.92, and in doing so, was tied for the most wins in the first half of the season. His win total tied a Nationals record set in 2005 by Liván Hernández.

On August 8, 2012, González hit his first career home run off Houston Astros pitcher Armando Galarraga and pitched his second career complete game. On August 31, González pitched his first career shutout in a 10–0 rout of the St. Louis Cardinals.

When González and the Nationals beat the Milwaukee Brewers on September 22, it moved his record to 20–8 and he became the first pitcher in MLB to reach the 20-win mark on the season. He finished the regular season with a major league best 21 wins, to go along with a 2.89 ERA and 207 strikeouts, winning the 2012 Warren Spahn Award as the best left-handed pitcher in the majors. González finished third in NL Cy Young voting in 2012.

==== 2013–2018 ====
González's name was among those listed in a January 2013 report about Biogenesis, a clinic producing and providing performance-enhancing drugs to MLB players. However, on August 5, González was cleared of any wrongdoing in connection with the Biogenesis scandal, and thus was not among the 12 players who were suspended for it.

In 2013, González had a record of 11–8 with a 3.36 ERA. In the first half of 2014, González went 6–5 with a 3.56 ERA. On July 20, González recorded his 1,000th career strikeout against the Milwaukee Brewers, including 511 strikeouts with the Oakland Athletics and 489 strikeouts with the Washington Nationals. He ended the 2014 season with a 10–10 record and a 3.57 ERA.

In 2015, he was 11–8 with a 3.79 ERA and led the major leagues in allowing opposing batters the highest batting average on balls in play (.341). In 2016, he went 11–11 with a 4.57 ERA, his highest since 2009. His WAR of 0.9 was also his worst since 2009. In 2017 he was 15–9 with a 2.96 ERA. He led the major leagues in stolen third bases of allowed with seven. To start 2018, he went 7–11 in 27 starts. He recorded 126 strikeouts while having a 4.57 ERA and a 1.5 WAR.

=== Milwaukee Brewers ===
On August 31, 2018, the Nationals traded González to the Milwaukee Brewers for KJ Harrison and Gilbert Lara. He would make five starts for the Brewers, going 3–0, posting a 2.13 ERA. In a 2–1 loss of Game 4 of the NLCS against the Los Angeles Dodgers, Gonzalez suffered a high ankle sprain, attempting to field a ball hit by Yasiel Puig, ending his season and being replaced by Zach Davies on the Brewers roster. He became a free agent following the season.

=== New York Yankees ===
On March 19, 2019, González signed a minor league contract with the New York Yankees. The deal guaranteed $3 million if he made the big league roster and $300,000 for each game started. After pitching for the Scranton/Wilkes-Barre RailRiders, González opted out of his contract and the Yankees released him on April 22.

=== Return to the Brewers ===
González signed a major league contract with Milwaukee on April 26. He went 2–1 with a 3.19 ERA to start the year with Milwaukee before going on the disabled list with a dead arm on June 1. He was activated from the DL on July 20. He became a free agent following the season.

=== Chicago White Sox ===
On December 20, 2019, González signed a one-year, $5 million contract with the Chicago White Sox, with an option for 2021. With the 2020 Chicago White Sox, González appeared in 12 games, compiling a 1–2 record with 4.83 ERA and 34 strikeouts in 31 2/3 innings pitched. He became a free agent following the season.

=== Miami Marlins ===
On March 3, 2021, González signed a minor league contract with the Miami Marlins organization that included an invitation to spring training. He announced his retirement on March 25, 2021, stating that donning the jersey of his hometown club was one of his "biggest dreams" but that his "body wasn't keeping up with his mind."

== Scouting ==
González threw four pitches: a four-seam fastball at 92–95 mph, a two-seam fastball at 91–95, a curveball at 78–82, and a changeup at 85–87 that he used against right-handed hitters. He used his curveball frequently when he was ahead in the count, especially against left-handers.

González's pitches had above-average strike out whiff rates, with the curveball leading at 36% and the changeup close behind at 35%. His curve also had an outstanding ground ball/fly ball ratio at nearly 7:1. Gio said of his curveball:

My curveball is a blessing. My father taught it to me. He felt that it was a pitch he wanted me to learn, right on the side of the house, and it just ended up working. I never asked what the tricks were, or anything like that. He made it simple for me to use on my own form, and it works for me. I've never changed my grip since the day my dad showed me how to throw it. He taught me how to try to make it look exactly like a fastball.

González was a strikeout pitcher, with a rate of nearly one per inning over his career. He was fourth in strikeouts per nine innings pitched in the AL in 2011, and second in the NL for the 2012 season (as of 17 August 2012).

== Personal life ==
González is married to Berenice Lea Moures, with whom he has two children.

In 2012, González created the GIO (Giving Individuals Opportunities) foundation, a charity to assist medical patients in need of financial support. He is also a comic book hobbyist.

On July 13, 2024, González returned to Nationals Park in a guest pitching appearance for the Savannah Bananas, throwing a perfect inning.

== See also ==
- List of Major League Baseball annual wins leaders
- List of Washington Nationals team records
