= Jordan Walden =

American baseball player (born 1987)

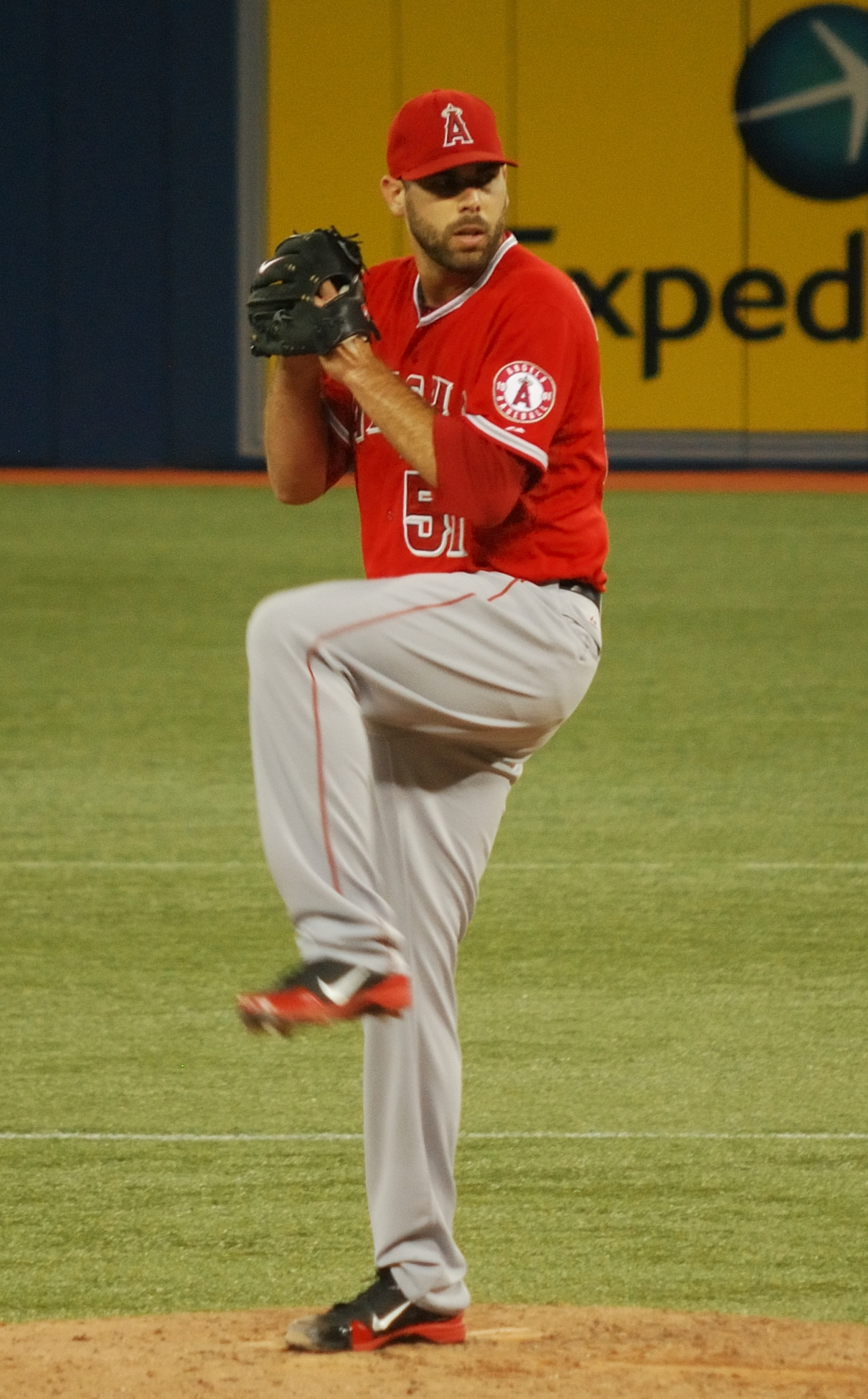
- Walden with the Los Angeles Angels of Anaheim
- Pitcher
- Born: November 16, 1987 (age 38); Fort Worth, Texas, U.S.
- Batted: Right Threw: Right

MLB debut
- August 22, 2010, for the Los Angeles Angels of Anaheim

Last MLB appearance
- April 29, 2015, for the St. Louis Cardinals

MLB statistics
- Win–loss record: 12–14
- Earned run average: 3.00
- Strikeouts: 266
- Saves: 39
- Stats at Baseball Reference

Teams
- Los Angeles Angels of Anaheim (2010–2012); Atlanta Braves (2013–2014); St. Louis Cardinals (2015)

Career highlights and awards
- All-Star (2011)

Jordan Craig Walden (born November 16, 1987) is an American former professional baseball pitcher. He played in Major League Baseball (MLB) for the Los Angeles Angels of Anaheim, Atlanta Braves, and St. Louis Cardinals.

== Early life ==
Walden was born November 16, 1987, in Fort Worth, Texas, and graduated in 2006 from Mansfield High School. While playing for the amateur league team D-BAT Mustangs of Carrollton, Texas, he was teammates with future fellow MLB pitcher Clayton Kershaw. After attending Grayson County Community College, Walden was drafted in the 12th round of the 2006 draft by the Los Angeles Angels of Anaheim he did not sign until a year later in May 2007.

== Professional career ==
=== Los Angeles Angels ===
==== Minor leagues ====
Walden was drafted by the Los Angeles Angels in the 12th round, with the 372nd overall selection, of the 2006 Major League Baseball draft, and began his professional career the next season.

Walden pitched for the rookie-level Orem Owlz in 2007, going 1–1 with a 3.08 ERA in 15 starts. In 64 1/3 innings, he allowed 49 hits and three home runs while striking out 63 batters. Prior to the 2008 season, Baseball America named Walden the 81st best prospect in minor league baseball. He split that season between the Single-A Cedar Rapids Kernels (with whom he went 4–6 with a 2.18 ERA in 18 starts) and the High-A Rancho Cucamonga Quakes (5–2, 4.04 ERA in nine starts), going a combined 9–8 with a 2.76 ERA in 27 starts. He pitched 156 1/3 innings, allowing 122 hits and seven home runs while striking out 141 batters.

Before the 2009 season, Walden was named the 70th best prospect in baseball. He pitched for the Double-A Arkansas Travelers and went 1–5 with a 5.25 ERA in 13 starts that season. In 2010, he converted to relief pitching, spending 38 games with the Travelers and six games with the Triple-A Salt Lake City Bees without making a start. Walden also was named Texas League Mid-season All-Star from the Arkansas Travelers in 2010.

==== Major leagues ====
The Los Angeles Angels promoted Walden to the major league roster on August 22, 2010, by purchasing his contract from Triple-A Salt Lake. Within the first week of his major league career, Walden's fastball had been recorded at speeds up to 101 miles per hour (163 km/h).

When the Angels traded Brian Fuentes to the Minnesota Twins on August 27, 2010, they began to use Walden as their setup pitcher in his place in the eighth inning. Walden recorded his first MLB save on September 19, against the Tampa Bay Rays.

The Angels named Walden their full-time closer on April 5, 2011, replacing Fernando Rodney. On July 7, Walden was selected to appear in the MLB All-Star Game for the first time, taking the place of an injured Mariano Rivera. He recorded his 30th save for the first time on September 13 against the Oakland Athletics, and finished the season with 32.

In 2012, Walden struggled with his command early in the season. The Angels demoted him from the closer role on April 27, replacing him with Scott Downs.

=== Atlanta Braves ===
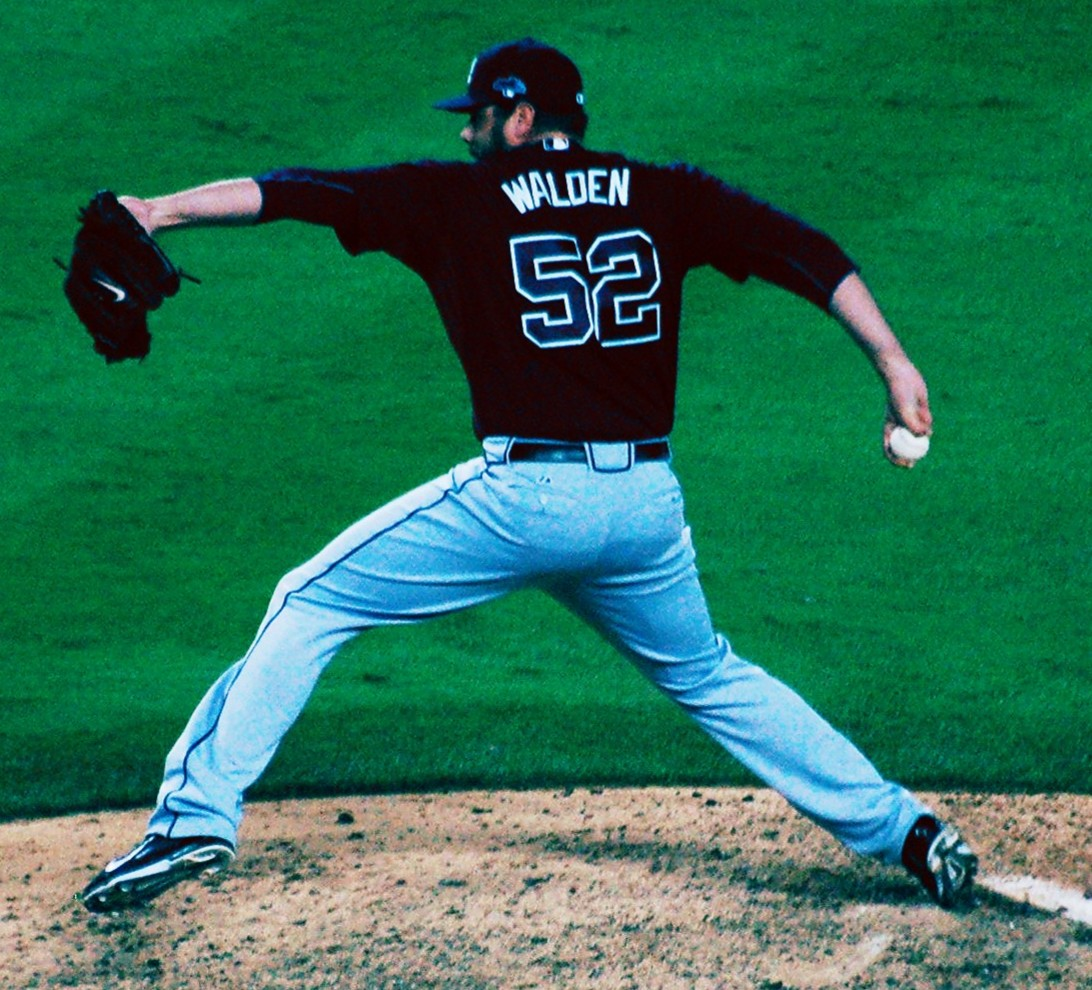
Walden pitching in 2013 NLDS game.

On November 30, 2012, the Angels traded Walden to the Atlanta Braves in exchange for pitcher Tommy Hanson. He pitched 47 innings, with a 4–3 win–loss record, 3.45 ERA, and 54 strikeouts during the 2013 season. Walden agreed to a one-year contract for the 2014 season, worth $1.49 million.

=== St. Louis Cardinals ===
On November 17, 2014, the Braves traded Walden and Jason Heyward to the St. Louis Cardinals in exchange for Shelby Miller and Tyrell Jenkins. Walden and the Cardinals signed a two-year extension on December 23, 2014, worth $6.6 million. Through April 29, 2015, he made 12 appearances with 12 strikeouts and one run allowed in 10 1/3 innings pitched for an 0.87 ERA. However, Walden was unable to pitch after that due to shoulder stiffness. On May 6, he was diagnosed with a right shoulder strain. The Cardinals initially estimated a timetable of six-to-ten weeks before he could return to pitching, but recovery took much longer than expected. Instead, Walden's shoulder did not recover, leaving the possibility of surgery to repair the rotator cuff. On September 6, the Cardinals ruled out his return for the remainder of the season. Walden rehabilitated the shoulder the following off-season in the Dallas–Fort Worth metroplex, adopting a program that was five days a week, four hours per day. He worked with former teammate Matt Belisle.

After sustaining a grade 2 latissimus dorsi muscle strain, the Cardinals placed Walden back on the disabled list to start the 2016 season. He became a free agent following the season.

On November 12, 2016, Walden signed a minor league contract with the Atlanta Braves. The Braves and Walden mutually agreed to void his contract on February 9, 2017, after discovering that his rehab had not been progressing as expected.

== Pitching style ==
Walden was a hard thrower, with a four-seam fastball ranging from 96 to 99 mph. His off-speed pitch to right-handed hitters was a slider in the mid 80s. He also threw the slider to lefties, but in 2011 he developed a changeup at 86–89 mph that he used more often. His off-speed pitches worked extremely well in tandem with his fastball, with whiff rates of about 48% on his changeup and 61% on his slider — each well above the league averages. He also experimented with a two-seam fastball. The high whiff rates have contributed to a 10.9 K/9 ratio through mid-2012.

Walden had an unusual pitching motion. He hopped in the middle of his windup, and actually had both feet in the air for a split second, before returning to the ground and throwing the ball.
