= 2011 Major League Baseball All-Star Game =

2011 American baseball competition

	1	2	3	4	5	6	7	8	9	R	H	E
American League	0	0	0	1	0	0	0	0	0	1	6	0
National League	0	0	0	3	1	0	1	0	X	5	9	2
- Date: July 12, 2011
- Venue: Chase Field
- City: Phoenix, Arizona
- Managers: Ron Washington (TEX); Bruce Bochy (SF)
- MVP: Prince Fielder (MIL)
- Attendance: 47,994
- Ceremonial first pitch: Joe Garagiola and Daniel Hernández
- Television: Fox (United States); MLB International (International)
- TV announcers: Joe Buck and Tim McCarver (Fox); Gary Thorne, Rick Sutcliffe (MLB International)
- Radio: ESPN
- Radio announcers: Jon Sciambi and Chris Singleton

The 2011 Major League Baseball All-Star Game was the 82nd in-season exhibition game between the All-Stars of the National League (NL) and the American League (AL); the leagues composing Major League Baseball. The event was held on Tuesday, July 12, 2011 at Chase Field in Phoenix, Arizona, home of the National League Arizona Diamondbacks. The game ended in a 5–1 win for the National League, their second straight All-Star victory. It was the first MLB All-Star Game to be held in Arizona and the first in a National League Park to have a designated hitter.

With a combination of injuries and rule enforcements, a record 84 players were named to the All-Star rosters. This broke the record of 82 players that were on rosters for the 2010 game.

== Background ==
As with each All-Star Game since 1970, the nine starting position players of each league were elected by fan balloting. The remaining players were selected by a players' vote, each league's team manager, and a second fan balloting to add one more player to each roster. In all, 32 players were selected to each league's team, not including players who decline to play due to injuries or personal reasons.

Diamondbacks manager Bob Melvin confirmed on April 10, 2009, that Arizona would host the 2011 All-Star Game and it was officially announced by Commissioner Bud Selig the next day. Phoenix had never hosted the All-Star Game before; the last first-time host city was Denver, Colorado in 1998. The game was the ninth straight All-Star Game to decide home-field advantage in the World Series. Prior All-Star games had only used the designated hitter (DH) rule when in American League parks. However, the 2011 game was the first to feature a DH in a NL park following a rules change in 2010. The NL came into the game having won the previous year's match, their first victory since 1996.

=== Immigration controversy ===
Some, such as New York Congressman José Serrano and sportswriter Mike Lupica, had suggested that Major League Baseball Commissioner Bud Selig should move the game because of the controversial SB1070 anti-illegal immigration bill passed by the Arizona legislature and signed into law by Governor Jan Brewer. Others considered asking club owners, sponsors and even players to boycott the All-Star Game if the law was implemented and the game remained in Phoenix. However, Selig announced on May 13, 2010, that the game would remain at Chase Field in Phoenix as planned. Two of the players who threatened to boycott, Red Sox slugger Adrian Gonzalez and Detroit Tigers reliever Jose Valverde, ended up participating in the game without incident after a federal court ruled against the strictest portions of the bill. Other stars who threatened to boycott but regardless were not all-stars in 2011 were pitchers Yovani Gallardo and Joakim Soria; Albert Pujols likewise voiced opposition to the law before it was neutered.

== Fan balloting ==
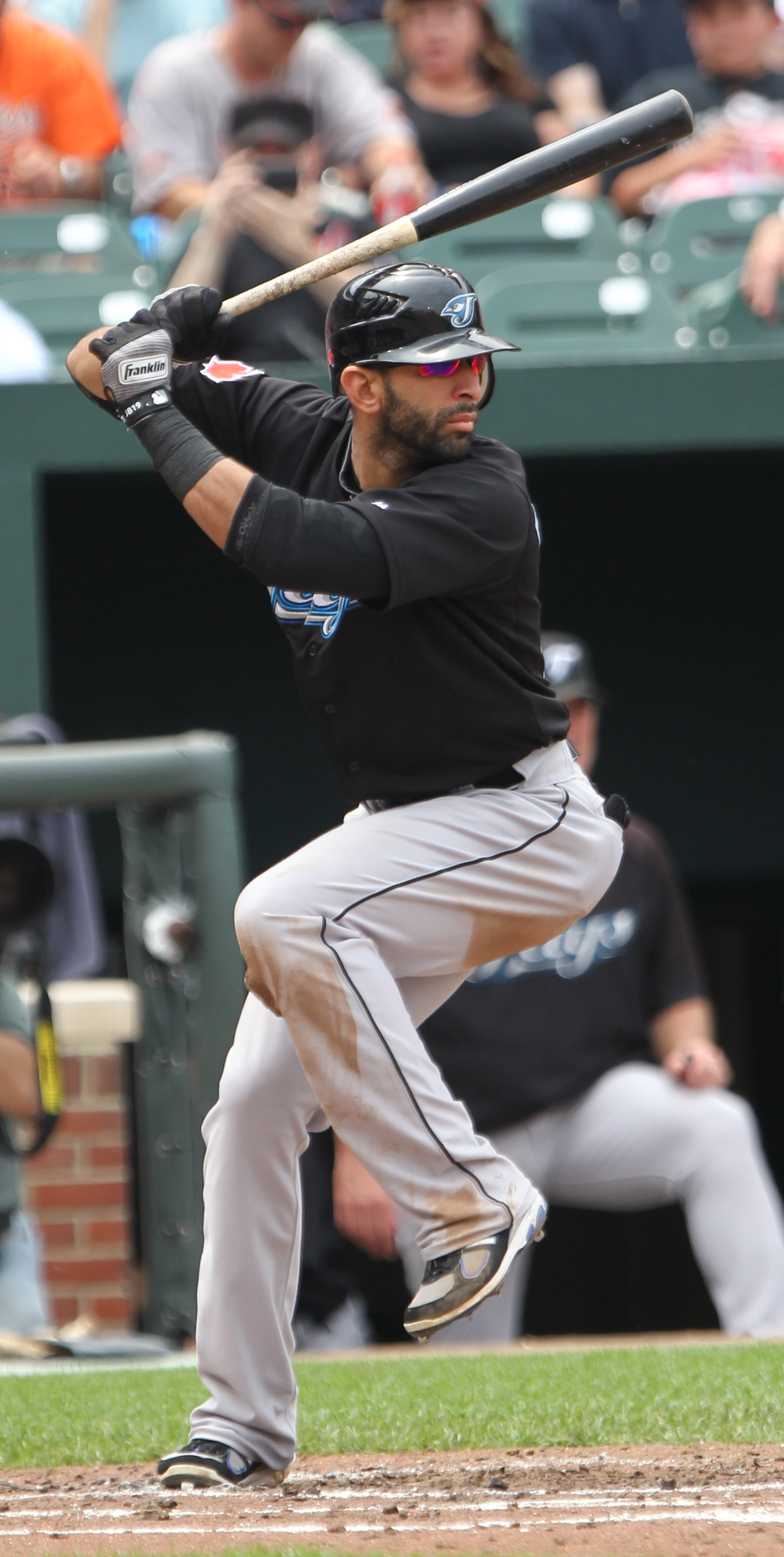
José Bautista was the leading vote-getter in 2011, breaking the previous record for most votes by more than 1 million.

=== Starters ===
Balloting for the 2011 All-Star Game starters began online April 26 and continued through June 30. Fan voting also took place in each MLB stadium, beginning May 10 (at the latest) and ending on June 24. The top vote-getters at each position and the top three among outfielders, were named the starters for their respective leagues. The results were announced on July 3. A record 32.5 million votes were cast, beating out the previous record from 2009 by roughly 9 million. José Bautista was the leading vote-getter with 7,454,753 votes, easily breaking the previous single-player vote record of 6,069,688 held by Ken Griffey Jr. Three other American League players also topped Griffey's record. Ryan Braun was the National League's leading vote getter, receiving a NL record 5,928,004 votes.

=== Final roster spot ===
After the rosters were revealed, a second ballot of five players per league was created for the All-Star Final Vote to determine the 34th and final player of each roster, with online balloting conducted from Sunday afternoon, July 3, through Thursday afternoon, July 7. The winners of the final vote were Paul Konerko of the Chicago White Sox (AL) and Shane Victorino of the Philadelphia Phillies. Victorino became the first ever two-time Final Vote winner, having also won in 2009.

Player	Team	Pos.	Player	Team	Pos
American League			National League		
Alex Gordon	KC	OF	Andre Ethier	LAD	OF
Adam Jones	BAL	OF	Todd Helton	COL	1B
Paul Konerko	CWS	1B	Ian Kennedy	ARI	P
Víctor Martínez	DET	C	Michael Morse	WAS	1B
Ben Zobrist	TB	2B	Shane Victorino	PHI	OF

== Rosters ==
Players in italics have since been inducted into the National Baseball Hall of Fame.

=== American League ===
Elected starters
Position	Player	Team	All-Star Games
C	Alex Avila	Tigers	1
1B	Adrián González	Red Sox	4
2B	Robinson Canó	Yankees	3
3B	Alex Rodriguez^{#}	Yankees	14
SS	Derek Jeter^{#}	Yankees	12
OF	José Bautista	Blue Jays	2
OF	Curtis Granderson	Yankees	2
OF	Josh Hamilton	Rangers	4
DH	David Ortiz	Red Sox	7

Reserves
Position	Player	Team	All-Star Games
C	Russell Martin	Yankees	3
C	Matt Wieters	Orioles	1
1B	Miguel Cabrera	Tigers	6
1B	Paul Konerko	White Sox	5
2B	Howard Kendrick	Angels	1
3B	Adrián Beltré	Rangers	2
3B	Kevin Youkilis (Note: Kevin Youkilis replaced Alex Rodriguez on the roster due to injury.)	Red Sox	3
SS	Asdrúbal Cabrera	Indians	1
SS	Jhonny Peralta (Note: Jhonny Peralta replaced Derek Jeter on the roster due to fatigue.)	Tigers	1
OF	Michael Cuddyer	Twins	1
OF	Jacoby Ellsbury	Red Sox	1
OF	Matt Joyce	Rays	1
OF	Carlos Quentin	White Sox	2
DH	Michael Young	Rangers	7

Pitchers
Player	Team	All-Star Games
Josh Beckett	Red Sox	3
Aaron Crow	Royals	1
Gio González	Athletics	1
Félix Hernández^{#}	Mariners	2
Brandon League	Mariners	1
Jon Lester^{#} (Note: Jon Lester replaced Félix Hernández on the roster due to Hernandez's ineligibility to pitch.)	Red Sox	2
Alexi Ogando (Note: Alexi Ogando replaced CC Sabathia on the roster due to Sabathia's ineligibility to pitch.)	Rangers	1
Chris Perez	Indians	1
Michael Pineda (Note: Michael Pineda replaced Justin Verlander on the roster due to Verlander's ineligibility to pitch.)	Mariners	1
David Price^{#}	Rays	2
Mariano Rivera^{#}	Yankees	12
David Robertson (Note: David Robertson replaced David Price on the roster due to injury.)	Yankees	1
Ricky Romero (Note: Ricky Romero replaced Jon Lester on the roster due to injury.)	Blue Jays	1
CC Sabathia^{#} (Note: CC Sabathia replaced James Shields on the roster due to Shields' ineligibility to pitch.)	Yankees	5
James Shields^{#}	Rays	1
José Valverde^{†}	Tigers	3
Justin Verlander^{#}	Tigers	4
Jordan Walden (Note: Jordan Walden replaced Mariano Rivera on the roster due to injury.)	Angels	1
Jered Weaver	Angels	2
C. J. Wilson	Rangers	1

=== National League ===
Elected starters
Position	Player	Team	All-Star Games
C	Brian McCann	Braves	6
1B	Prince Fielder	Brewers	3
2B	Rickie Weeks	Brewers	1
3B	Plácido Polanco^{#}	Phillies	2
SS	José Reyes^{#}	Mets	4
OF	Lance Berkman	Cardinals	6
OF	Ryan Braun^{#}	Brewers	4
OF	Matt Kemp	Dodgers	1
DH	Carlos Beltrán	Mets	6

Reserves
Position	Player	Team	All-Star Games
C	Yadier Molina	Cardinals	3
C	Miguel Montero (Note: Miguel Montero replaced Plácido Polanco on the roster due to injury.)	Diamondbacks	1
1B	Gaby Sánchez	Marlins	1
1B	Joey Votto	Reds	2
2B	Brandon Phillips	Reds	2
3B	Chipper Jones^{#}	Braves	7
3B	Scott Rolen (Note: Scott Rolen replaced Chipper Jones on the roster due to injury.)	Reds	7
3B	Pablo Sandoval (Note: Pablo Sandoval replaced Jose Reyes on the roster due to injury.)	Giants	1
SS	Starlin Castro	Cubs	1
SS	Troy Tulowitzki	Rockies	2
OF	Jay Bruce	Reds	1
OF	Andre Ethier (Note: Andre Ethier replaced Shane Victorino on the roster due to injury.)	Dodgers	2
OF	Matt Holliday	Cardinals	5
OF	Andrew McCutchen (Note: Andrew McCutchen replaced Ryan Braun on the roster due to injury.)	Pirates	1
OF	Hunter Pence	Astros	2
OF	Justin Upton	Diamondbacks	2
OF	Shane Victorino^{#}	Phillies	2

Pitchers
Player	Team	All-Star Games
Heath Bell	Padres	3
Matt Cain^{#}	Giants	2
Tyler Clippard	Nationals	1
Kevin Correia (Note: Kevin Correia replaced Cole Hamels on the roster due to Hamels' ineligibility to pitch.)	Pirates	1
Roy Halladay	Phillies	8
Cole Hamels^{#}	Phillies	2
Joel Hanrahan	Pirates	1
Jair Jurrjens	Braves	1
Clayton Kershaw	Dodgers	1
Craig Kimbrel (Note: Craig Kimbrel replaced Matt Cain on the roster due to Cain's ineligibility to pitch.)	Braves	1
Cliff Lee	Phillies	3
Tim Lincecum	Giants	4
Jonny Venters	Braves	1
Ryan Vogelsong	Giants	1
Brian Wilson^{†}	Giants	3

- #: Indicates player would not play (replaced as per reference notes above).
- †: Indicates player was designated as his team's closer.

== Game summary ==
=== Starters ===
American League				National League			
Order	Player	Team	Position	Order	Player	Team	Position
1	Curtis Granderson	Yankees	CF	1	Rickie Weeks	Brewers	2B
2	Asdrúbal Cabrera	Indians	SS	2	Carlos Beltrán	Mets	DH
3	Adrián González	Red Sox	1B	3	Matt Kemp	Dodgers	CF
4	José Bautista	Blue Jays	RF	4	Prince Fielder	Brewers	1B
5	Josh Hamilton	Rangers	LF	5	Brian McCann	Braves	C
6	Adrián Beltré	Rangers	3B	6	Lance Berkman	Cardinals	RF
7	David Ortiz	Red Sox	DH	7	Matt Holliday	Cardinals	LF
8	Robinson Canó	Yankees	2B	8	Troy Tulowitzki	Rockies	SS
9	Alex Avila	Tigers	C	9	Scott Rolen	Reds	3B
	Jered Weaver	Angels	P		Roy Halladay	Phillies	P

=== Box Score ===
Tuesday, July 12, 2011 5:40 pm (MST) Chase Field in Phoenix, Arizona
Team	1	2	3	4	5	6	7	8	9	R	H	E
American League	0	0	0	1	0	0	0	0	0	1	6	0
National League	0	0	0	3	1	0	1	0	X	5	9	2
Starting pitchers: AL: Jered Weaver; NL: Roy Halladay; WP: Tyler Clippard (1–0) LP: C. J. Wilson (0–1) Sv: Brian Wilson (1); Home runs: AL: Adrián González; NL: Prince Fielder

UMPIRES: Home Plate – Dale Scott; First Base – Jerry Layne; Second Base – Hunter Wendelstedt; Third Base – Dan Iassogna; Left Field – Ed Hickox; Right Field – Chris Guccione
Weather: Indoors
Time of Game: 2:50 Attendance: 47,994

The American League struck first on Adrián González's two-out home run in the fourth off of Cliff Lee, who allowed two singles. Tyler Clippard in relief allowed a single to Adrian Beltre, but José Bautista was tagged out at home to end the inning. In the bottom half, after two leadoff singles, Prince Fielder's three-run home run off of C. J. Wilson put the National League up 3–1. Next inning, Rickie Weeks reached first on a fielder's choice, stole second and scored on Andre Ethier's single off of Jordan Walden. The National League added another run in the seventh when Hunter Pence hit a leadoff single, moved to third on Brandon League's passed ball and scored on Pablo Sandoval's ground-rule double and went on to win the game 5–1.

== All-Star Game notes ==
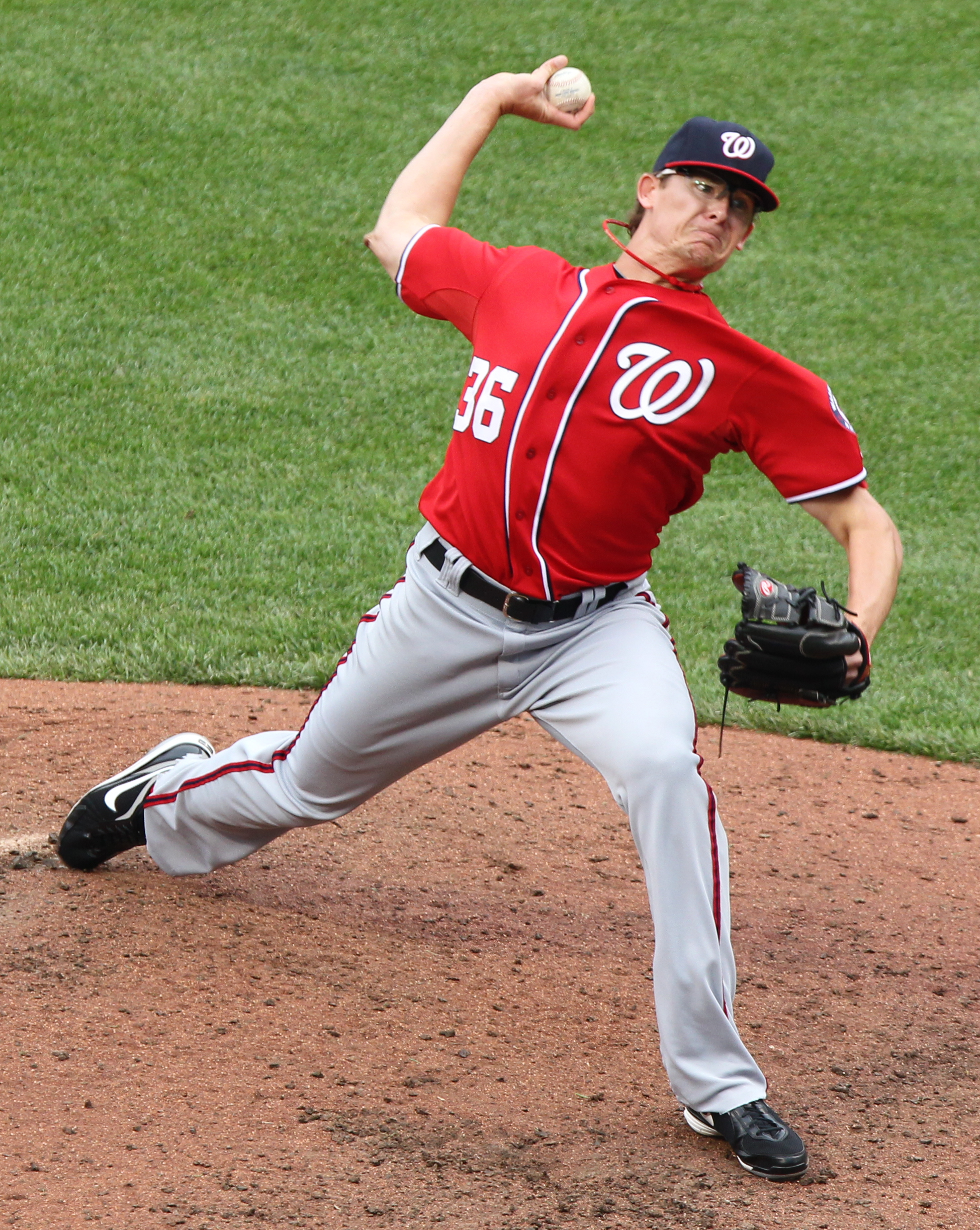
The game's winning pitcher, Tyler Clippard, surprisingly, did not retire a batter.

- Prince Fielder's three-run home run in the bottom of the fourth inning was the first home run ever hit by a Milwaukee Brewers player in the All-Star Game.
- Adrián González's home run off of Cliff Lee and Fielder's home run off of C. J. Wilson makes it the first time in All-Star Game history where there were two lefty-versus-lefty home runs.
- Brian Wilson became the second pitcher since 1969 (when saves became an official stat) to earn a save in the All-Star Game after recording a save in the clinching game of the previous World Series. Dennis Eckersley accomplished this feat by finishing the World Series in 1989 and then in the 1990 All-Star Game at Wrigley Field.
- Tyler Clippard became the first pitcher in Major League history to earn a win in an All-Star Game or a postseason game by facing only one batter and allowing a hit. Adrián Beltré singled to left off Clippard, but Hunter Pence threw José Bautista out at home plate to end the top of the fourth inning. The NL took the lead for good in the bottom half of the frame, making Clippard the pitcher of record.
- This was also the second-straight All-Star Game where the winning pitcher was a member of the Washington Nationals. Matt Capps was the winner in 2010.
- Eight different American League pitchers struck out at least one batter, a record for an All-Star Game that did not go extra innings.
- Relief pitcher Heath Bell had players and fans laughing as he entered the game in the eight inning. Bell sprinted from the bullpen and did a slide in front of the pitcher's mound, taking out a chunk of the infield grass and leaving grass stains on his pants. "I wanted the fans to have fun with this", said Bell.
- For the first time in his career, Ichiro Suzuki was not named to the All-Star team.
- This marked the first time in which the All-Star Game was entirely played indoors since 1986, when it was played at the Astrodome in Houston.

== See also ==
- All-Star Futures Game
- Home Run Derby
