= 2011 Chicago White Sox season =

2011 Chicago White Sox
- League: American League
- Division: Central
- Ballpark: U.S. Cellular Field
- City: Chicago, Illinois
- Record: 79–83 (.488)
- Divisional place: 3rd
- Owners: Jerry Reinsdorf
- General managers: Kenny Williams
- Managers: Ozzie Guillén, Don Cooper
- Television: CSN Chicago; CSN+ WGN-TV and WGN America; WCIU-TV (Ken Harrelson, Steve Stone)
- Radio: WSCR (Ed Farmer, Darrin Jackson); WRTO (Spanish)

The 2011 Chicago White Sox season was the club's 112th season in Chicago and 111th in the American League. The 2011 White Sox schedule was revealed at 7:00 pm Central Time on September 14, 2010 along with every other team in Major League Baseball.

== Offseason ==
On December 2, 2010, the White Sox signed a new slugger Adam Dunn from the Washington Nationals for a 4yr/$56M contract. On that same day, the Sox also re-signed A. J. Pierzynski to a 2yr/$8M extension. Six days later, the Sox resigned Paul Konerko to a 3yr/$37.5M extension. With Dunn, Konerko, and Pierzynski, there is a 5% chance that the White Sox will win the 2011 World Series. On December 15, the White Sox acquired RHP Jesse Crain from the Minnesota Twins and offered a 3yr/$13M deal. On January 18, the Sox acquired RHP Philip Humber off waivers from the Oakland A's. One month prior, the A's claimed Humber from the Kansas City Royals.

In addition to acquisitions, the White Sox also traded away some players, including Scott Linebrink to Atlanta Braves on December 3, and J. J. Putz to Arizona Diamondbacks on December 7. Bobby Jenks, who was non-tendered by the White Sox, has agreed to sign with the Boston Red Sox on December 16.

== Transactions ==
- 12/03/10 – Signed free agent DH/1B Adam Dunn and re-signed C A. J. Pierzynski
- 12/08/10 – Re-signed 1B Paul Konerko
- 12/20/10 – Signed free agent RHP Jesse Crain
- 01/10/11 – Signed free agent LHP Will Ohman
- 01/18/11 – Claimed RHP Philip Humber off waivers from the Oakland Athletics
- 01/19/11 – Signed free agent 3B Dallas McPherson
- 02/03/11 – Signed free agent OF Lastings Milledge
- 06/13/11 – Claimed LHP Leyson Séptimo off waivers from the Arizona Diamondbacks
- 07/05/11 – Signed 1st round draft pick from 2011 MLB draft OF Keenyn Walker, assigned to Great Falls Voyagers
- 07/27/11 – Traded RHP Edwin Jackson and 3B Mark Teahen to the Toronto Blue Jays for RHP Jason Frasor and RHP Zach Stewart
- 09/29/11 – Received Osvaldo Martínez and Jhan Mariñez from the Florida Marlins as compensation for Ozzie Guillén, who agreed to a four-year contract to manage the Miami Marlins in 2012

== Regular season ==
=== Season standings ===
==== American League Central ====
AL Central
Team	W	L	Pct.	GB	Home	Road
Detroit Tigers	95	67	.586	—	50‍–‍31	45‍–‍36
Cleveland Indians	80	82	.494	15	44‍–‍37	36‍–‍45
Chicago White Sox	79	83	.488	16	36‍–‍45	43‍–‍38
Kansas City Royals	71	91	.438	24	40‍–‍41	31‍–‍50
Minnesota Twins	63	99	.389	32	33‍–‍48	30‍–‍51

==== American League Wild Card ====
Division winners
Team	W	L	Pct.
New York Yankees	97	65	.599
Texas Rangers	96	66	.593
Detroit Tigers	95	67	.586

Wild Card team (Top team qualifies for postseason)
Team	W	L	Pct.	GB
Tampa Bay Rays	91	71	.562	—
Boston Red Sox	90	72	.556	1
Los Angeles Angels	86	76	.531	5
Toronto Blue Jays	81	81	.500	10
Cleveland Indians	80	82	.494	11
Chicago White Sox	79	83	.488	12
Oakland Athletics	74	88	.457	17
Kansas City Royals	71	91	.438	20
Baltimore Orioles	69	93	.426	22
Seattle Mariners	67	95	.414	24
Minnesota Twins	63	99	.389	28

=== Record vs. opponents ===
2011 American League record Source: MLB Standings Grid – 2011
Team	BAL	BOS	CWS	CLE	DET	KC	LAA	MIN	NYY	OAK	SEA	TB	TEX	TOR	NL
Baltimore	–	8–10	4–4	2–5	5–5	5–4	3–6	6–2	5–13	4–5	4–2	9–9	1–5	6–12	7–11
Boston	10–8	–	2–4	4–6	5–1	5–3	6–2	5–2	12–6	6–2	5–4	6–12	4–6	10–8	10–8
Chicago	4–4	4–2	–	11–7	5–13	7–11	2–6	9–9	2–6	6–4	7–2	4–4	4–4	3–4	11–7
Cleveland	5–2	6–4	7–11	–	6–12	12–6	3–6	11–7	3–4	5–2	5–4	2–4	1–9	3–4	11–7
Detroit	5–5	1–5	13–5	12–6	–	11–7	3–4	14–4	4–3	5–5	4–6	6–1	6–3	4–2	7–11
Kansas City	4–5	3–5	11–7	6–12	7–11	–	7–3	8–10	3–3	4–5	5–3	2–5	2–6	4–3	5–13
Los Angeles	6–3	2–6	6–2	6–3	4–3	3–7	–	6–3	4–5	8–11	12–7	4–4	7–12	5–5	13–5
Minnesota	2–6	2–5	9–9	7–11	4–14	10–8	3–6	–	2–6	4–4	3–5	3–7	5–3	1–5	8–10
New York	13–5	6–12	6–2	4–3	3–4	3–3	5–4	6–2	–	6–3	5–4	9–9	7–2	11–7	13–5
Oakland	5–4	2–6	4–6	2–5	5–5	5–4	11–8	4–4	3–6	–	9–10	5–2	6–13	5–5	8–10
Seattle	2–4	4–5	2–7	4–5	6–4	3–5	7–12	5–3	4–5	10–9	–	4–6	4–15	3–6	9–9
Tampa Bay	9–9	12–6	4–4	4–2	1–6	5–2	4–4	7–3	9–9	2–5	6–4	–	4–5	12–6	12–6
Texas	5–1	6–4	4–4	9–1	3–6	6–2	12–7	3–5	2–7	13–6	15–4	5–4	–	4–6	9–9
Toronto	12–6	8–10	4–3	4–3	2–4	3–4	5–5	5–1	7–11	5–5	6–3	6–12	6–4	–	8–10

- Source: MLB Standings Grid – 2011

==== Detailed records and runs scored/allowed ====
Opponent	Home	Away	Total	Pct.	Runs scored	Runs allowed
AL East
Baltimore Orioles	1–3	3–1	4–4	.500	37	42
Boston Red Sox	1–2	3–0	4–2	.667	32	30
New York Yankees	0–4	2–2	2–6	.250	20	51
Tampa Bay Rays	3–1	1–3	4–4	.500	33	26
Toronto Blue Jays	2–1	1–3	3–4	.429	25	34
	7–11	10–9	17–20	.459	147	184
AL Central
Cleveland Indians	5–4	6–3	11–7	.611	91	81
Detroit Tigers	3–6	2–7	5–13	.278	62	111
Kansas City Royals	4–5	3–6	7–11	.389	74	91
Minnesota Twins	3–6	6–3	9–9	.500	65	55
	15–21	17–19	32–40	.444	302	340
AL West
Los Angeles Angels	0–3	2–3	2–6	.250	27	38
Oakland Athletics	4–3	2–1	6–4	.600	43	43
Seattle Mariners	2–1	5–1	7–2	.778	41	19
Texas Rangers	3–2	1–2	4–4	.500	27	26
	9–9	10–7	19–16	.543	141	128
Interleague
Arizona Diamondbacks	0–0	2–1	2–1	.667	15	8
Chicago Cubs	2–1	2–1	4–2	.667	18	18
Colorado Rockies	0–0	2–1	2–1	.667	11	9
Los Angeles Dodgers	2–1	0–0	2–1	.667	21	11
Washington Nationals	1–2	0–0	1–2	.333	9	11
	5–4	6–3	11–7	.611	74	57

=== Roster ===
2011 Chicago White Sox
Roster
Pitchers: 39 Dylan Axelrod; 40 Brian Bruney; 56 Mark Buehrle; 26 Jesse Crain; 50 John Danks; 34 Gavin Floyd; 58 Jason Frasor; 60 Jeff Gray; 58 Lucas Harrell; 41 Philip Humber; 33 Edwin Jackson; 52 Josh Kinney; 66 Shane Lindsay; 77 Will Ohman; 44 Jake Peavy; 57 Tony Peña; 43 Addison Reed; 49 Chris Sale; 60 Hector Santiago; 46 Sergio Santos; 48 Zach Stewart; 37 Matt Thornton	Catchers: 27 Ramón Castro; 17 Tyler Flowers; 55 Donny Lucy; 12 A. J. Pierzynski; Infielders: 15 Gordon Beckham; 32 Adam Dunn; 62 Eduardo Escobar; 14 Paul Konerko; 18 Brent Lillibridge; 45 Dallas McPherson; 22 Brent Morel; 10 Alexei Ramírez; 23 Mark Teahen; 11 Omar Vizquel; Outfielders: 30 Alejandro De Aza; 5 Lastings Milledge; 20 Carlos Quentin; 1 Juan Pierre; 51 Alex Ríos; 24 Dayán Viciedo	Manager: 21 Don Cooper; 13 Ozzie Guillén; Coaches: 3 Harold Baines (first base); 21 Don Cooper (pitching); 28 Joey Cora (bench); 8 Jeff Cox (third base); 36 Juan Nieves (bullpen); 59 Mark Salas (bullpen catcher); 29 Greg Walker (hitting)

=== Season summary ===
==== Composite inning summary ====
	1	2	3	4	5	6	7	8	9	10	11	12	13	14
Runs scored	68	85	71	78	73	68	80	73	40	14	0	4	0	1
Runs allowed	84	54	70	91	79	121	69	59	58	14	1	2	1	5

==== Opening Day lineup ====
1	Juan Pierre	LF
15	Gordon Beckham	2B
32	Adam Dunn	DH
14	Paul Konerko	1B
51	Alex Ríos	CF
20	Carlos Quentin	RF
12	A. J. Pierzynski	C
10	Alexei Ramírez	SS
22	Brent Morel	3B
56	Mark Buehrle	P

=== Monthly summaries ===
==== April ====
The Sox opened the 2011 season at Cleveland with a 15–10 victory over the Indians on April 1. It was the first time since September 7, 2007, that the Sox won while allowing 10 or more runs. The Sox had their first 2–0 start since 2005 with an 8–3 win over Cleveland. In the third game of this series in the 4th inning, Alexei Ramírez bunted into a 3–4–6 triple play. It was the first time that the Sox hit into a triple play since 1978. The Sox went on to lose this game 7–1. On April 5 at Kansas City Royals, the Sox scored four runs in the first inning but they would not hold on to the lead. The Sox played for 12 innings until the new Royals batter Melky Cabrera hit a walk-off single to score the former Sox player Chris Getz to suffer their first walk-off loss of the season. Last season, the Sox did not suffer their first walk-off loss until July 18 at Minnesota. After the loss, Adam Dunn had his appendix removed and he'll miss five games, but he told Ozzie Guillén that he wants to play sooner. The next game against the Royals, the Sox trailed 5–0 going to the 7th inning. In the ninth inning, the Sox took the lead 7–6 by scoring four runs against the Royals closer Joakim Soria, but the Royals tied this game up in the bottom half. Then the Sox scored three runs in the 12th inning to take the victory 10–7 over the Royals. However, the Sox committed four errors in this game.

The Sox had their home opener against the Tampa Bay Rays with a 5–1 victory on April 7. Edwin Jackson struck out 13 to set his new career high and most strikeouts by the White Sox pitcher in the home opener in club history. In next game for the first eight innings, the Sox led 7–4. In the top of the ninth inning, the Sox committed two errors which led to five unearned runs including a three-run homer by Dan Johnson off of Matt Thornton. The Sox would lose the game 9–7. That was their first win of the season for Rays. In addition, in the top of the ninth inning after Johnson's home run, the Rays took their first lead of the season after going 62 consecutive innings without lead. It is now the most consecutive innings without lead of any team of all time. The Sox would then go on and win the final two games of this series to take three out of four from the Rays with the final scores of 4–2 and 6–1. The next series against the Oakland A's, the Sox lost two out of three with the only win being a walk-off home run in 10th inning by Alexei Ramírez in Game 2. In both losses, the Sox led going into the ninth inning only to give up runs to tie the game and lose in the 10th. For the first 12 games this season, the bullpen allowed 12 runs including 6 unearned runs in the ninth inning to lead the majors. They led the majors with 6 blown saves in 7 opportunities. In the next series, the Sox got swept by the Angels at home for the first time since 2005. The Sox finished 4–6 on the homestand.

The Sox avoided a four-game sweep by beating the Rays 9–2 behind Gavin Floyd on April 22. Then the Sox were swept by Tigers at Detroit, including being scoreless twice. The Sox split the series against the Yankees at New York, including two straight plays by Brent Lillibridge off the bats of Alex Rodríguez and Robinson Canó to end the game on April 26. The Sox finished their 11-game road trip 3–8. The Sox lost the first two games of the four-game series against the Baltimore Orioles to finish April with a 10–18 record.

==== May ====
The Sox opened the month of May with a 6–4 loss to the Orioles. Then the Sox avoided getting swept by beating the Orioles 6–2. Then on May 3 against the Minnesota Twins, Francisco Liriano no-hit the White Sox. Liriano threw 123 pitches with six walks and just two strikeouts. Prior to this game, Liriano had an ERA of 9.13, which is the second highest ERA before the no-hitter since 1913. After the no-hitter, his ERA dropped to 6.61. It is the Twins first no-hitter since Eric Milton threw one on Sep 11, 1999 against the California Angels. The Sox went hitless for the first time since Aug 26, 1991 when the Royals' pitcher Bret Saberhagen threw against them. The Sox lost again 3–2 on the next day to Minnesota to have the worst record in MLB at 11–21.

Then the Sox went on to the west coast in Seattle, Los Angeles, and Oakland, finishing 6–3 in that nine-game road trip. During the road trip on May 11 at Los Angeles, Jake Peavy started the game for the first time since July 6 of last season when he tore his lat muscle, also against the Angels. He went 6 IP 7 H 4 ER 4 K in no decision as Sox defeated Angels 6–4 in 10 innings. When Peavy added to the starting rotation and Philip Humber is too good to be moved to the bullpen, the Sox used the six-man rotation. On May 15, Mark Buehrle outdueled Trevor Cahill as Sox defeated Oakland 4–3.

The Sox went back home splitting a two-game series against the Rangers and swept the two-game series over the first-place Indians, including a three-hit shutout by Jake Peavy in the first game of that series in his second start of the season. On the next night, the Sox lost the first game of the series against the Dodgers after giving up a home run to Russell Mitchell in the 9th inning by Sergio Santos which tied the game at 3. Until Mitchell's homer, Santos did not allow a run this season, he went 20 scoreless innings. Then the Dodgers scored three runs in the 10th to beat the Sox 6–4. The Game storm betts was go but his mom got a speeding ticket day before on way home from school Meanwhile, the Sox won the final two games against the Dodgers to win their first interleague series of the season. The Sox lost two out of three at Texas. In the second game of that series on May 24, the game was in a 2:58 rain delay, but the Sox took this game 8–6 in 9 innings as the game ended at 1:27 am CT. In next series at Toronto, the Sox took the opener by a final score of 3–1 by scoring two runs in the ninth inning. In the third game of this series, the Sox tied the game up at 8 in the ninth inning. In the Sox half of the 11th inning, Brent Morel hit a lead-off double but the team did not score. In the Blue Jays' half of 14th inning with starter Gavin Floyd in relief, a leadoff hitter Corey Patterson hit a walk-off homer which ended the game with a final score of 9–8. The Sox suffered their fourth walk-off loss of the season. In the finale of that series, John Danks gave up 9 runs in 4 innings. The Sox went on to lose 13–4 and Danks was then 0–8 with a 5.25 ERA. With the only win in that four-game series coming in the opener of the series, the Sox had lost seven straight games in the finale of a four-game series when they won the opener and lost the next two dating back to the start of 2007 season. On Memorial Day, the Sox took Game 1 of the series at Boston with a final score of 7–3. In Game 2, the Sox defeated the Red Sox 10–7, as the White Sox bullpen allowed 6 runs in final two innings. The Sox finished May with a 16–13 record.

==== June ====
Continuing the series at Boston starting in May, the Sox played the finale of the series at Boston looking for a second consecutive sweep at Boston, and then they did. The White Sox defeated the Red Sox 7–4 to win their seventh straight at Fenway Park, their longest since 1958–59 when they also won seven straight. The White Sox have also won 13 of their last 15 contests against the Red Sox overall. Over the last 15 games, the White Sox have outscored the Red Sox 88–50 during that span.

On June 3, the Sox began their 10-game homestand against the Tigers. The Sox won the opener of the three-game series 6–4 but they lost the series by losing the last two with final scores of 4–2 and 7–3. Finally on June 6, John Danks outdueled Michael Pineda to take the first win of the season by beating the Mariners 3–1. Danks is the last qualified starting pitcher of the season to record a win. Philip Humber dominated again as Sox defeat Seattle 5–1. In the finale of this three-game series, Carlos Quentin hit his game-tying two-run homer to tie the game 4–4 in eighth inning. That was his second homer of the game after his solo jack in first inning. However, the Sox will lose the game 7–4 in 10 innings. In the opener of the 4-game series against Oakland, Mark Buehrle outdueled Trevor Cahill again as they defeated Oakland 9–4. Then the next game was ugly. In the ninth inning with two outs, nobody one, and 0–2 count, Sox led 5–3, Josh Willingham walked and then deteriorated. Several at-bats later, Scott Sizemore (who just acquired from Detroit couple days prior) hit his game-winning three-run double to defeat the Sox 7–5 as Sergio Santos blows his second save of the season. On next day, Danks recorded his back-to-back win after losing eight decision by beating Oakland 3–2. In that game in the eighth inning, Brent Lillibridge made his game-saving home run robbing catch off the bat of Coco Crisp with runner on first. In the finale of this series on June 12, Sox defeat Oakland 5–4 to take three out of four from Oakland and finish the homestand 6–4.

The Sox played a two-game series at Minnesota from June 15–16 because the game was postponed due to rain on June 14. The Sox were swept in a two-game series including a 1–0 loss. The Sox went to Arizona for the first time since 2003, where they take two out of three. In the opener of this series, Edwin Jackson faced Daniel Hudson who switched teams between Sox and D-backs last season. Hudson wins 4–1 over Jackson. The Sox won the final two games of this series with the final scores of 6–2 and 8–2. Even though D-backs were 2nd in NL in home runs, D-backs did not hit any home runs against the Sox in this series.

The Sox came home to play the Cubs and the Nats. The Sox lost the opener of the series to the Cubs 6–2 and won the last two by the scores of 3–2 and 4–3. The Sox allowed a home run to former Ray Carlos Peña in all three game of this series including a game-winning three-run homer in the 6th in the opener of this series. In the opener of the last season's rematch with the Nats, in the ninth inning, Mark Teahen hit a game-tying three-run homer to tie the game at 3. The Nats score a run in the tenth on Laynce Nix's solo home run. The Sox scored one in the bottom half to tie the game again. In the 12th inning, the Nats scored a run and in the bottom half, A. J. Pierzynski tied the game up yet again with a solo home run with two outs and an 0–2 count. In the 14th inning, Alexei Ramírez committed an error with led to four gifted runs for a 9–5 Sox loss. Then the Sox won the second game of this series 3–0. John Danks got injured after 1.2 IP and he would go on the 15-day disabled list with a right oblique strain. Jake Peavy would pitch for 4 innings for his 4th victory of the season. In the finale of this series, in the 7th inning with one out and one on, Paul Konerko appeared to hit a GW two-run homer but the wind kept it in the ballpark and Jerry Hairston Jr. made a catch in left field. The Sox would go on to lose 2–1 and the Sox lost the home series against the Nats even though the Sox swept the Nats at D.C. last season. Also in that game, Adam Dunn went 0–4 with four strikeouts, becoming the first big league player to strikeout 100 times this season.

The Sox would then head to Denver for the first time since 2005, taking two out of three from the Rox, including a split in extra-inning games. The Sox finished the month of June with a 14–11 record.

==== July ====
The Sox opened the month of July with a 6–4 comeback victory over the Cubs at Wrigley Field. They won the next game 1–0 by a great pitching performance by Humber and then they lost 3–1 in the finale of this series. The Sox finished the season series against the Cubs 4–2 and 11–7 in interleague play. The Sox lost two out of three from Kansas City and three out of four from Minnesota at U.S. Cellular Field before heading into the All-Star break. Both of those wins came on a walk-off. The Sox are 8–31 against Minnesota since May 21, 2009 and 1–7 against them in 2011. The Sox went on their 8-game road trip excluding a rain-out game at Cleveland. The Sox took two out of three from Detroit, lost two out of three to Royals, and swept two games at Cleveland. Then the Sox went on to their 10-game homestand with six games left in July. The Sox won the series against the Detroit again and then they lost two out of three to Boston Red Sox via the Rock Series (WLL) after the Sox swept the other Sox in Boston earlier this season. During the off day on July 27 before the series against Boston, the Sox traded away Edwin Jackson and Mark Teahen to Toronto Blue Jays for Jason Frasor and Zach Stewart. Jackson would then be traded to St. Louis Cardinals. The Sox finished the month of July with a 12–12 record with a losing home record (5–8) but a winning road record (7–4).

==== August ====
The Sox continued their 10-game homestand started in July with four games to play against the Yankees. Worst of all, the Sox got swept in a four-game series at home against the Yankees for the first time since June 1976 and first time the Sox swept in a four-game series at home by an opponent since August 2007 when the White Sox were swept by Red Sox. In a third game of this dreadful four-game series, the Sox allowed a season high 18 runs, including 13 in the first three innings. Also during the four-game series, the Sox hitters never walked.

After that dreadful series against the Yankees, the Sox went to Target Field to take on the Twins for the three-game series. In Game 2 of this series, Zach Stewart, who acquired from Toronto in Edwin Jackson deal, started this game and got his first Major League win by going 6.1 IP and 1 ER. In Game 3 of this series, Jake Peavy pitched eight shutout innings. The Sox would go on to sweep the Twins on the road for the first time since June/July 2004 by the scores of 5–3, 6–1, and 7–0. Then the Sox went to Baltimore and took three of four to even the season series against the Orioles 4–4. Then the Sox went home to play the Royals, Indians, and the first place Rangers. The Sox took two of three from the Royals, lost two of three from the Indians, and won two of three from the Rangers, all via rock series. The Sox went to the west coast to take on the Angels and the Mariners. The Sox were swept in a two-game series against the Halos and the Sox swept the Mariners in a three-game weekend series. In the finale of that series, Dayán Viciedo called up from Triple-A Charlotte to play right field as Carlos Quentin went to the 15-day DL. In his second at-bat, Viciedo hit his three-run homer to make it 3–0 Sox. A couple innings later, Tyler Flowers, who is playing for A. J. Pierzynski who is also on the 15-day DL, hit his first career grand slam and his second homer of his career. It is also the first grand slam the Sox have hit this season. The Sox would go on to win this game 9–3 to complete the sweep. Since the start of the 2008 season, the Sox have won 23 of the last 25 games when they hit grand slam(s).

The Sox concluded the month by taking two out of three from the struggling Twins. The Sox finished the month of August with a 16–12 record with a losing home record (7–9) but a winning road record (9–3).

==== September ====
The Sox began the month by getting swept in the Motor City by Tigers, which increase the Sox deficit of Detroit from 5½ to 8½ games. In that series, the Sox were outscored 35–11 in a three-game series including an 18–2 loss in the second game. The Sox went to Minnesota and won their first three games of a four-game series and then lost the last game that would otherwise been their first four-game sweep in Minnesota ever. In the second game of this series (second game of a doubleheader), rookie Zach Stewart flirted with perfecto as he retired the first 21 Twin batters he faced before giving up a double to Danny Valencia. Stewart would then go on to retire six straight to end the game with a one-hitter.

The Sox came back to U.S. Cellular Field to take on the Indians in a four-game set. The Sox split the series. On the morning of September 10, Jake Peavy decided to shut down for the rest of the season so he'll get more time to relax his lat muscles recovered from surgery and make him stronger for next season. Peavy finished the season with a 4.92 ERA in 18 starts and 1 relief appearance. Later on that day in the third game of a four-game set against the Indians, Alex Ríos hit a walk-off grand slam in the 10th inning for a 7–3 Sox victory. Then the Sox got ugly, they were swept by Detroit in a three-game series at home in September for the second consecutive year. In the finale of that series, the Sox led 5–2 going to the 9th inning and then Sergio Santos suffered his 6th blown save of the season by giving up two home runs and preventing rookie Dylan Axelrod from picking up his first major league win. The Sox would lose in the 10th inning 6–5. So the playoff chances for the Sox is nil as they fall to 13½ games behind Detroit.

The Sox played their final road trip of the season: they lost three out of four against the Royals and won two out of four against the Indians. The Sox played their final homestand of the season: the Sox lost two out of three against the Royals and won two out of three against the Blue Jays. In the opener of that series against the Blue Jays, Dylan Axelrod picked up his first major league win, going 6 IP, 3 H, 0 ER, 2 BB, 6 K in a 4–3 Sox victory. After the opener against the Blue Jays, the manager Ozzie Guillén called it quits as the White Sox skipper and he will manage the Miami Marlins under his four-year contract starting next season. The pitching coach Don Cooper took over as manager for the final two games of the season. The Sox would go on to finish the month of September with an 11–17 record and a third-place finish at 79–83 overall, suffering their losing season in third consecutive odd-numbered years. With a road record of 43–38, it is the first team in franchise history to end the season with a losing overall record but a winning road record.

== Game log ==
Legend
White Sox win	White Sox loss	Game postponed

2011 White Sox game log
April (10–18) – Home (4–8) – Road (6–10) – 109 R.S. 143 R.A.

#	Date	Opponent	Score	Win	Loss	Save	Time	Attendance	Record	GB	Box
1	April 1	@ Indians	15–10	Buehrle (1–0)	Carmona (0–1)		3:09	41,721	1–0	+½	box
2	April 2	@ Indians	8–3	Jackson (1–0)	Carrasco (0–1)		2:46	9,853	2–0	+½	box
3	April 3	@ Indians	7–1	Masterson (1–0)	Danks (0–1)		2:27	8,726	2–1	−½	box
4	April 5	@ Royals	7–6 (12)	Jeffress (1–0)	Peña (0–1)		3:32	12,641	2–2	−1½	box
5	April 6	@ Royals	10–7 (12)	Sale (1–0)	O'Sullivan (0–1)		3:41	13,360	3–2	−½	box
6	April 7	Rays	5–1	Jackson (2–0)	Price (0–2)		2:30	38,579	4–2	0	box
7	April 8	Rays	9–7	Russell (1–0)	Thornton (0–1)	Farnsworth (1)	3:13	20,199	4–3	−1	box
8	April 9	Rays	4–2	Humber (1–0)	Davis (0–2)	Sale (1)	2:43	26,378	5–3	−1	box
9	April 10	Rays	6–1	Floyd (1–0)	Niemann (0–2)		2:08	23,436	6–3	−1	box
10	April 11	Athletics	2–1 (10)	Ross (1–0)	Crain (0–1)	Fuentes (4)	2:37	20,057	6–4	−2	box
11	April 12	Athletics	6–5 (10)	Sale (2–0)	Cramer (0–1)		3:32	18,020	7–4	−1	box
12	April 13	Athletics	7–4 (10)	Balfour (1–1)	Thornton (0–2)	Fuentes (5)	3:23	16,523	7–5	−1	box
13	April 15	Angels	4–3	Weaver (4–0)	Humber (1–1)	Walden (2)	2:53	20,103	7–6	−2	box
14	April 16	Angels	7–2	Chatwood (1–1)	Floyd (1–1)		2:35	21,250	7–7	−3	box
15	April 17	Angels	4–2	Haren (4–0)	Buehrle (1–1)	Walden (3)	2:40	23,458	7–8	−4	box
16	April 18	@ Rays	5–0	Price (2–2)	Jackson (2–1)		2:26	12,016	7–9	−5	box
17	April 19	@ Rays	2–1	Shields (1–1)	Danks (0–2)		2:12	13,731	7–10	−6	box
18	April 20	@ Rays	4–1	Davis (2–2)	Humber (1–2)	Farnsworth (4)	2:30	13,214	7–11	−6	box
19	April 21	@ Rays	9–2	Floyd (2–1)	Niemann (0–3)		2:58	16,751	8–11	−5	box
20	April 22	@ Tigers	9–3	Verlander (2–2)	Buehrle (1–2)		2:30	23,537	8–12	−6	box
21	April 23	@ Tigers	9–0	Penny (1–2)	Jackson (2–2)		3:01	35,227	8–13	−7	box
22	April 24	@ Tigers	3–0	Scherzer (4–0)	Danks (0–3)	Valverde (5)	2:19	17,784	8–14	−7	box
23	April 25	@ Yankees	2–0	Humber (2–2)	Burnett (3–1)	Santos (1)	2:41	40,506	9–14	−6	box
24	April 26	@ Yankees	3–2	Floyd (3–1)	Soriano (1–1)	Santos (2)	2:54	40,785	10–14	−5	box
25	April 27	@ Yankees	3–1	Colón (2–1)	Buehrle (1–3)	Rivera (8)	2:11	40,586	10–15	−6	box
26	April 28	@ Yankees	12–3	Sabathia (2–1)	Jackson (2–3)		3:06	40,081	10–16	−7	box
27	April 29	Orioles	10–4	Arrieta (3–1)	Danks (0–4)		2:58	21,816	10–17	−8	box
28	April 30	Orioles	6–2	Tillman (1–2)	Humber (2–3)		2:46	26,104	10–18	−9	box

May (16–13) – Home (6–5) – Road (10–8) – 129 R.S. 109 R.A.

#	Date	Opponent	Score	Win	Loss	Save	Time	Attendance	Record	GB	Box
29	May 1	Orioles	6–4	Britton (5–1)	Floyd (3–2)	Gregg (5)	3:03	22,029	10–19	−10	box
30	May 2	Orioles	6–2	Buehrle (2–3)	Guthrie (1–4)	Santos (3)	2:43	18,007	11–19	−9½	box
31	May 3	Twins	1–0	Liriano (2–4)	Jackson (2–4)		2:09	20,901	11–20	−10½	box
32	May 4	Twins	3–2	Blackburn (2–4)	Danks (0–5)	Capps (5)	2:30	18,028	11–21	−10½	box
33	May 6	@ Mariners	3–2	Hernández (4–2)	Thornton (0–3)		2:27	31,912	11–22	−11	box
34	May 7	@ Mariners	6–0	Floyd (4–2)	Fister (2–4)		2:38	26,288	12–22	−11	box
35	May 8	@ Mariners	5–2 (10)	Santos (1–0)	League (0–1)		3:09	26,074	13–22	−10	box
36	May 9	@ Angels	8–0	Jackson (3–4)	Santana (1–4)		2:29	38,561	14–22	−9½	box
37	May 10	@ Angels	6–2	Piñeiro (2–0)	Danks (0–6)		2:32	40,128	14–23	−10½	box
38	May 11	@ Angels	6–4 (10)	Santos (2–0)	Jepsen (0–2)	Thornton (1)	3:13	39,151	15–23	−9½	box
39	May 13	@ Athletics	4–3	Humber (3–3)	McCarthy (1–4)	Santos (4)	2:21	12,690	16–23	−9	box
40	May 14	@ Athletics	6–2	Ross (3–2)	Floyd (4–3)		2:49	17,291	16–24	−9	box
41	May 15	@ Athletics	4–3	Buehrle (3–3)	Cahill (6–1)	Santos (5)	2:32	19,018	17–24	−9	box
42	May 16	Rangers	4–0	Lewis (4–4)	Jackson (3–5)		2:39	23,048	17–25	−10	box
43	May 17	Rangers	4–3	Crain (1–1)	Eppley (1–1)	Santos (6)	2:36	22,437	18–25	−10	box
44	May 18	Indians	1–0	Peavy (1–0)	Masterson (5–2)		2:01	18,580	19–25	−9	box
45	May 19	Indians	8–2	Floyd (5–3)	Carmona (3–4)		2:32	22,077	20–25	−8	box
46	May 20	Dodgers	6–4 (10)	Jansen (1–0)	Santos (2–1)	MacDougal (1)	3:17	24,121	20–26	−10	box
47	May 21	Dodgers	9–2	Buehrle (4–3)	Garland (1–4)		2:33	25,519	21–26	−9	box
48	May 22	Dodgers	8–3	Jackson (4–5)	Kuroda (5–4)	Thornton (2)	3:20	25,081	22–26	−9	box
49	May 23	@ Rangers	4–0	Ogando (5–0)	Danks (0–7)		2:05	30,861	22–27	−10	box
50	May 24	@ Rangers	8–6	Peña (1–1)	Tomko (0–1)	Santos (7)	3:21	35,524	23–27	−9	box
51	May 25	@ Rangers	2–1	Wilson (5–3)	Floyd (5–4)	Feliz (10)	2:39	32,382	23–28	−9	box
52	May 26	@ Blue Jays	3–1	Crain (2–1)	Rzepczynski (2–1)	Santos (8)	2:54	14,353	24–28	−8½	box
53	May 27	@ Blue Jays	4–2	Janssen (2–0)	Buehrle (4–4)	Rauch (6)	2:52	16,668	24–29	−8½	box
54	May 28	@ Blue Jays	9–8 (14)	Pérez (1–0)	Floyd (5–5)		4:17	22,659	24–30	−9½	box
55	May 29	@ Blue Jays	13–4	Romero (5–4)	Danks (0–8)		2:33	18,325	24–31	−9½	box
56	May 30	@ Red Sox	7–3	Peavy (2–0)	Lester (7–2)		3:24	37,463	25–31	−8½	box
57	May 31	@ Red Sox	10–7	Humber (4–3)	Aceves (2–1)	Sale (2)	2:51	37,269	26–31	−8½	box

June (14–11) – Home (9–7) – Road (5–4) – 90 R.S. 80 R.A.

#	Date	Opponent	Score	Win	Loss	Save	Time	Attendance	Record	GB	Box
58	June 1	@ Red Sox	7–4	Floyd (6–5)	Albers (1–3)	Santos (9)	2:53	37,321	27–31	−8	box
59	June 3	Tigers	6–4	Buehrle (5–4)	Oliver (0–1)	Santos (10)	3:04	23,095	28–31	−7	box
60	June 4	Tigers	4–2	Verlander (6–3)	Crain (2–2)	Valverde (15)	3:17	31,037	28–32	−7	box
61	June 5	Tigers	7–3	Penny (5–4)	Peavy (2–1)		3:25	25,149	28–33	−7	box
62	June 6	Mariners	3–1	Danks (1–8)	Pineda (6–3)	Santos (11)	2:23	23,847	29–33	−6	box
63	June 7	Mariners	5–1	Humber (5–3)	Hernández (6–5)		2:25	21,337	30–33	−6	box
64	June 8	Mariners	7–4 (10)	Laffey (1–1)	Santos (2–2)	League (17)	3:06	21,517	30–34	−6	box
65	June 9	Athletics	9–4	Buehrle (6–4)	Cahill (6–4)		2:51	22,170	31–34	−5½	box
66	June 10	Athletics	7–5	Balfour (4–1)	Santos (2–3)	Bailey (1)	3:10	20,166	31–35	−5½	box
67	June 11	Athletics	3–2	Danks (2–8)	Gonzalez (5–5)	Crain (1)	3:01	24,391	32–35	−4½	box
68	June 12	Athletics	5–4	Humber (6–3)	Moscoso (2–3)	Santos (12)	2:51	22,144	33–35	−3½	box
−	June 14	@ Twins	Postponed (rain), rescheduled for September 6							−4	
69	June 15	@ Twins	4–1	Pavano (4–5)	Floyd (6–6)		2:06	37,437	33–36	−4½	box
70	June 16	@ Twins	1–0	Blackburn (6–4)	Buehrle (6–5)	Capps (9)	2:09	39,484	33–37	−5½	box
71	June 17	@ D-Backs	4–1	Hudson (8–5)	Jackson (4–6)		2:37	26,053	33–38	−5½	box
72	June 18	@ D-Backs	6–2	Danks (3–8)	Duke (1–2)		2:41	33,230	34–38	−5½	box
73	June 19	@ D-Backs	8–2	Humber (7–3)	Collmenter (4–3)		2:38	39,538	35–38	−5½	box
74	June 20	Cubs	6–3	Zambrano (6–4)	Floyd (6–7)	Mármol (15)	2:45	36,005	35–39	−5½	box
75	June 21	Cubs	3–2	Crain (3–2)	Samardzija (5–3)	Santos (13)	2:31	35,155	36–39	−4½	box
76	June 22	Cubs	4–3	Peavy (3–1)	Davis (1–6)	Santos (14)	3:01	35,403	37–39	−4½	box
77	June 24	Nationals	9–5 (14)	Balester (1–0)	Thornton (0–4)		4:58	23,856	37–40	−4½	box
78	June 25	Nationals	3–0	Peavy (4–1)	Gorzelanny (2–6)	Santos (15)	2:54	23,008	38–40	−3½	box
79	June 26	Nationals	2–1	Hernández (5–8)	Humber (7–4)	Storen (19)	2:56	24,057	38–41	−4½	box
80	June 28	@ Rockies	3–2 (13)	Brothers (1–0)	Ohman (0–1)		3:47	40,175	38–42	−5	box
81	June 29	@ Rockies	3–2	Bruney (1–0)	Street (0–2)	Santos (16)	2:24	35,973	39–42	−4	box
82	June 30	@ Rockies	6–4 (10)	Crain (4–2)	Mortensen (2–4)	Santos (17)	3:41	38,084	40–42	−4	box

July (12–12) – Home (5–8) – Road (7–4) – 77 R.S. 78 R.A.

#	Date	Opponent	Score	Win	Loss	Save	Time	Attendance	Record	GB	Box
83	July 1	@ Cubs	6–4	Jackson (5–6)	Wells (1–3)	Santos (18)	2:43	41,486	41–42	−3½	box
84	July 2	@ Cubs	1–0	Humber (8–4)	Garza (4–7)	Thornton (3)	2:37	42,165	42–42	−3½	box
85	July 3	@ Cubs	3–1	López (1–2)	Floyd (6–8)	Mármol (17)	2:23	42,311	42–43	−3½	box
86	July 4	Royals	5–4	Santos (3–3)	Crow (2–2)		2:36	31,077	43–43	−3½	box
87	July 5	Royals	5–3	Paulino (1–6)	Peavy (4–2)	Soria (14)	2:59	20,695	43–44	−3½	box
88	July 6	Royals	4–1	Chen (5–2)	Jackson (5–7)	Soria (15)	2:40	27,233	43–45	−4½	box
89	July 7	Twins	6–2	Pavano (6–6)	Humber (8–5)		2:35	26,395	43–46	−5½	box
90	July 8	Twins	8–5	Blackburn (7–6)	Floyd (6–9)	Capps (14)	3:22	27,737	43–47	−5½	box
91	July 9	Twins	4–3	Crain (5–2)	Mijares (0–1)		2:36	30,055	44–47	−4½	box
92	July 10	Twins	6–3	Swarzak (2–2)	Peavy (4–3)	Capps (15)	3:00	30,042	44–48	−5	box
All–Star Break: NL defeats AL 5–1 at Chase Field
93	July 15	@ Tigers	8–2	Floyd (7–9)	Verlander (12–5)		3:06	43,593	45–48	−5	box
94	July 16	@ Tigers	5–0	Jackson (6–7)	Scherzer (10–5)		2:46	40,984	46–48	−4	box
95	July 17	@ Tigers	4–3	Penny (7–6)	Humber (8–6)	Valverde (25)	2:40	37,049	46–49	−4	box
96	July 18	@ Royals	5–2	Buehrle (7–5)	Davies (1–9)		2:37	17,190	47–49	−4½	box
97	July 19	@ Royals	4–2	Duffy (2–4)	Peavy (4–4)	Soria (17)	2:28	20,126	47–50	−5½	box
98	July 20	@ Royals	2–1 (11)	Crow (3–2)	Sale (2–1)		2:47	13,831	47–51	−5½	box
99	July 22	@ Indians	3–0	Floyd (8–9)	Carrasco (8–8)	Santos (19)	2:45	27,477	48–51	−5	box
–	July 23	@ Indians	Postponed (rain), rescheduled for September 20							–5½	
100	July 24	@ Indians	4–2	Jackson (7–7)	Masterson (8–7)	Santos (20)	2:54	20,252	49–51	−4½	box
101	July 25	Tigers	6–3	Buehrle (8–5)	Below (0–1)		3:00	37,110	50–51	−3½	box
102	July 26	Tigers	5–4	Verlander (14–5)	Ohman (0–2)	Valverde (27)	3:04	28,093	50–52	−4½	box
103	July 27	Tigers	2–1	Danks (4–8)	Scherzer (11–6)	Santos (21)	2:50	26,978	51–52	−3½	box
104	July 29	Red Sox	3–1	Floyd (9–9)	Wakefield (6–4)	Santos (22)	2:10	27,513	52–52	−3	box
105	July 30	Red Sox	10–2	Lester (11–4)	Humber (8–7)		3:00	33,919	52–53	−3	box
106	July 31	Red Sox	5–3	Aceves (7–1)	Crain (5–3)	Papelbon (24)	3:31	28,278	52–54	−4	box

August (16–12) – Home (7–9) – Road (9–3) – 127 R.S. 118 R.A.

#	Date	Opponent	Score	Win	Loss	Save	Time	Attendance	Record	GB	Box
107	August 1	Yankees	3–2	Sabathia (16–5)	Peavy (4–5)	Rivera (28)	2:30	24,142	52–55	−4½	box
108	August 2	Yankees	6–0 (7)	Hughes (2–3)	Danks (4–9)		1:59	21,661	52–56	−5½	box
109	August 3	Yankees	18–7	Wade (2–0)	Floyd (9–10)		3:13	23,873	52–57	−6½	box
110	August 4	Yankees	7–2	Nova (10–4)	Humber (8–8)		2:44	28,088	52–58	−6½	box
111	August 5	@ Twins	5–3	Buehrle (9–5)	Blackburn (7–9)	Sale (3)	2:29	41,364	53–58	−6½	box
112	August 6	@ Twins	6–1	Stewart (1–1)	Pavano (6–9)		2:44	41,030	54–58	−6½	box
113	August 7	@ Twins	7–0	Peavy (5–5)	Duensing (8–10)		2:30	39,353	55–58	−5½	box
114	August 8	@ Orioles	7–6	Crain (6–3)	Johnson (5–4)	Santos (23)	2:38	17,498	56–58	−5	box
115	August 9	@ Orioles	4–3	Floyd (10–10)	Reyes (5–9)	Santos (24)	2:42	14,177	57–58	−4	box
116	August 10	@ Orioles	6–4 (10)	Gonzalez (2–2)	Frasor (2–2)		3:00	18,747	57–59	−4	box
117	August 11	@ Orioles	6–3	Buehrle (10–5)	Tillman (3–5)	Santos (25)	2:32	21,040	58–59	−4	box
118	August 12	Royals	5–1	Chen (7–5)	Stewart (1–2)	Holland (2)	2:55	23,130	58–60	−5	box
119	August 13	Royals	5–4	Crain (7–3)	Hochevar (8–9)	Sale (4)	2:58	24,854	59–60	−5	box
120	August 14	Royals	6–2	Danks (5–9)	Francis (4–13)		2:47	25,517	60–60	−4	box
121	August 16	Indians	8–7 (14)	Frasor (3–2)	Durbin (2–2)		5:21	24,695	61–60	−3½	box
122	August 17	Indians	4–1	Carmona (6–12)	Buehrle (10–6)	Perez (26)	2:46	25,029	61–61	−3½	box
123	August 18	Indians	4–2	Masterson (10–7)	Ohman (0–3)	Perez (27)	3:05	27,079	61–62	−4	box
124	August 19	Rangers	7–4	Tateyama (2–0)	Peavy (5–6)	Feliz (25)	2:47	28,308	61–63	−5	box
125	August 20	Rangers	3–2	Crain (8–3)	Uehara (1–3)	Santos (26)	2:33	30,021	62–63	−5	box
126	August 21	Rangers	10–0	Floyd (11–10)	Holland (11–5)		3:04	25,033	63–63	−5	box
127	August 23	@ Angels	5–4	Walden (4–3)	Frasor (3–3)		2:48	37,728	63–64	−6½	box
128	August 24	@ Angels	8–0	Weaver (15–6)	Stewart (1–3)		2:28	36,610	63–65	−6½	box
129	August 26	@ Mariners	4–2	Peavy (6–6)	Furbush (3–6)	Sale (5)	3:06	28,621	64–65	−7	box
130	August 27	@ Mariners	3–0	Danks (6–9)	Pineda (9–8)		2:09	30,522	65–65	−7	box
131	August 28	@ Mariners	9–3	Floyd (12–10)	Vargas (7–12)		2:45	25,630	66–65	−6	box
132	August 29	Twins	3–0	Buehrle (11–6)	Slowey (0–3)	Santos (27)	2:04	24,120	67–65	−5	box
133	August 30	Twins	8–6	Ohman (1–3)	Swarzak (3–5)	Santos (28)	2:57	21,632	68–65	−5	box
134	August 31	Twins	7–6	Diamond (1–2)	Peavy (6–7)	Nathan (12)	2:42	20,346	68–66	−6	box

September (11–17) – Home (5–8) – Road (6–9) – 106 R.S. 158 R.A.

#	Date	Opponent	Score	Win	Loss	Save	Time	Attendance	Record	GB	Box
135	September 2	@ Tigers	8–1	Verlander (21–5)	Danks (6–10)		2:39	42,352	68–67	−6½	box
136	September 3	@ Tigers	9–8	Marte (1–0)	Santos (3–4)		3:10	40,635	68–68	−7½	box
137	September 4	@ Tigers	18–2	Scherzer (14–8)	Buehrle (11–7)		3:21	42,671	68–69	−8½	box
138	September 5	@ Twins	2–1	Humber (9–8)	Swarzak (3–6)	Sale (6)	2:27	40,252	69–69	−8½	box
139	September 5	@ Twins	4–0	Stewart (2–3)	Diamond (1–3)		2:26	39,849	70–69	−8	box
140	September 6	@ Twins	3–0	Peavy (7–7)	Hendriks (0–1)	Santos (29)	2:29	36,959	71–69	−8	box
141	September 7	@ Twins	5–4	Pavano (8–11)	Danks (6–11)	Nathan (13)	2:44	38,359	71–70	−9	box
142	September 8	Indians	8–1	Thornton (1–4)	Huff (2–4)		3:18	22,063	72–70	−8½	box
143	September 9	Indians	8–4	Gómez (3–2)	Buehrle (11–8)		2:58	26,711	72–71	−9½	box
144	September 10	Indians	7–3 (10)	Santos (4–4)	Perez (3–7)		3:27	26,719	73–71	−9½	box
145	September 11	Indians	7–3	Jiménez (9–11)	Stewart (2–4)		3:01	22,319	73–72	−10½	box
146	September 12	Tigers	14–4	Porcello (13–8)	Danks (6–12)		3:04	22,750	73–73	−11½	box
147	September 13	Tigers	5–0	Verlander (23–5)	Floyd (12–11)		3:23	25,015	73–74	−12½	box
148	September 14	Tigers	6–5 (10)	Coke (3–9)	Santos (4–5)	Valverde (44)	3:05	19,010	73–75	−13½	box
149	September 15	@ Royals	7–2	Francis (6–16)	Buehrle (11–9)		2:38	17,737	73–76	−13½	box
150	September 16	@ Royals	7–6	Holland (5–1)	Thornton (1–5)		3:13	24,918	73–77	−14½	box
151	September 17	@ Royals	10–3	Teaford (2–0)	Stewart (2–5)	Adcock (1)	2:47	31,264	73–78	−14½	box
152	September 18	@ Royals	10–5	Danks (7–12)	Chen (11–8)		3:07	29,480	74–78	−14½	box
153	September 20	@ Indians	4–3	Carmona (7–15)	Floyd (12–12)	Perez (35)	2:19	28,603	74–79	−14	box
154	September 20	@ Indians	5–4	Thornton (2–5)	Putnam (0–1)	Sale (7)	3:15	19,582	75–79	−14	box
155	September 21	@ Indians	8–4	Buehrle (12–9)	Jiménez (10–12)		2:52	12,400	76–79	−14	box
156	September 22	@ Indians	11–2	Gómez (5–2)	Humber (9–9)		2:36	21,487	76–80	−14	box
157	September 23	Royals	11–1	Chen (12–8)	Stewart (2–6)		2:22	21,744	76–81	−15	box
158	September 24	Royals	6–3	Danks (8–12)	Teaford (2–1)		2:24	26,249	77–81	−14	box
159	September 25	Royals	2–1	Mendoza (2–0)	Floyd (12–13)	Holland (4)	2:29	22,018	77–82	−15	box
160	September 26	Blue Jays	4–3	Axelrod (1–0)	McGowan (0–2)	Santos (30)	2:49	21,320	78–82	−15	box
161	September 27	Blue Jays	2–1	Buehrle (13–9)	Álvarez (1–3)	Sale (8)	2:15	23,934	79–82	−15	box
162	September 28	Blue Jays	3–2	Camp (6–3)	Sale (2–2)	Francisco (17)	2:48	20,524	79–83	−16	box

== Player stats ==
=== Batting ===
Note: G = Games played; AB = At bats; R = Runs scored; H = Hits; 2B = Doubles; 3B = Triples; HR = Home runs; RBI = Runs batted in; BB = Base on balls; SO = Strikeouts; AVG = Batting average; SB = Stolen bases

Player	G	AB	R	H	2B	3B	HR	RBI	BB	SO	AVG	SB
Gordon Beckham, 2B	150	499	60	115	23	0	10	44	35	111	.230	5
Mark Buehrle, P	1	2	0	1	1	0	0	0	0	1	.500	0
Ramón Castro, C	23	68	6	16	3	0	4	10	7	23	.235	0
John Danks, P	1	3	0	0	0	0	0	0	0	0	.000	0
Alejandro De Aza, OF	54	152	29	50	11	3	4	23	17	34	.329	12
Adam Dunn, DH, 1B	122	415	36	66	16	0	11	42	75	177	.159	0
Eduardo Escobar, SS	9	7	0	2	0	0	0	0	0	1	.286	0
Tyler Flowers, C	38	110	13	23	5	1	5	16	14	38	.209	0
Gavin Floyd, P	2	3	0	0	0	0	0	0	1	1	.000	0
Philip Humber, P	2	5	0	0	0	0	0	0	0	2	.000	0
Edwin Jackson, P	2	4	0	0	0	0	0	0	0	1	.000	0
Paul Konerko, 1B, DH	149	543	69	163	25	0	31	105	77	89	.300	1
Brent Lillibridge, OF, 1B, 2B	97	186	38	48	5	1	13	29	17	62	.258	10
Donny Lucy, C	6	10	1	2	1	0	0	1	1	5	.200	0
Dallas McPherson, 3B	11	15	1	2	0	0	0	0	0	7	.133	0
Lastings Milledge, OF	2	4	1	1	1	0	0	0	0	1	.250	0
Brent Morel, 3B	126	413	44	101	18	1	10	41	22	57	.245	5
Jake Peavy, P	1	1	0	0	0	0	0	0	1	0	.000	0
Juan Pierre, LF	158	639	80	178	17	4	2	50	43	41	.279	27
A. J. Pierzynski, C, DH	129	464	38	133	29	1	8	48	23	33	.287	0
Carlos Quentin, RF, DH	118	421	53	107	31	0	24	77	34	84	.254	1
Alexei Ramírez, SS	158	614	81	165	31	2	15	70	51	84	.269	7
Alex Ríos, CF	145	537	64	122	22	2	13	44	27	68	.227	11
Zach Stewart, PR	1	0	0	0	0	0	0	0	0	0	.000	0
Mark Teahen, 3B, OF	51	118	11	24	3	0	3	11	12	28	.203	0
Dayán Viciedo, RF, DH, 1B	29	102	11	26	3	0	1	6	9	23	.255	1
Omar Vizquel, 3B, 2B, SS	58	167	18	42	7	1	0	8	9	18	.251	1
Team totals	162	5502	654	1387	252	16	154	625	475	989	.252	81

=== Pitching ===
Note: W = Wins; L = Losses; ERA = Earned run average; G = Games pitched; GS = Games started; SV = Saves; IP = Innings pitched; H = Hits allowed; R = Runs allowed; ER = Earned runs allowed; HR = Home runs allowed; BB = Walks allowed; K = Strikeouts; O-AVG = Opponent batting average

Player	W	L	ERA	G	GS	SV	IP	H	R	ER	HR	BB	K	O-AVG
Dylan Axelrod	1	0	2.89	4	3	0	18.2	18	6	6	1	9	19	.257
Brian Bruney	1	0	6.86	23	0	0	19.2	26	15	15	4	12	16	.338
Mark Buehrle	13	9	3.59	31	31	0	205.1	221	93	82	21	45	109	.277
Jesse Crain	8	3	2.62	67	0	1	65.1	50	20	19	7	31	70	.215
John Danks	8	12	4.33	27	27	0	170.1	182	89	82	19	46	135	.274
Gavin Floyd	12	13	4.37	31	30	0	193.2	180	97	94	22	45	151	.247
Jason Frasor	1	2	5.09	20	0	0	17.2	20	10	10	3	11	20	.286
Jeff Gray	0	0	2.70	6	0	0	13.1	13	4	4	1	4	7	.255
Lucas Harrell	0	0	7.20	3	0	0	5.0	11	4	4	0	1	5	.440
Philip Humber	9	9	3.75	28	26	0	163.0	151	71	68	14	41	116	.243
Edwin Jackson	7	7	3.92	19	19	0	121.2	134	55	53	8	39	97	.283
Josh Kinney	0	0	6.62	13	0	0	17.2	23	13	13	1	7	20	.319
Shane Lindsay	0	0	12.00	4	0	0	6.0	11	8	8	1	5	6	.379
Will Ohman	1	3	4.22	59	0	0	53.1	53	26	25	8	17	54	.255
Jake Peavy	7	7	4.92	19	18	0	111.2	117	61	61	10	24	95	.268
Tony Peña	1	1	6.20	17	0	0	20.1	25	15	14	2	10	17	.301
Addison Reed	0	0	3.68	6	0	0	7.1	10	3	3	1	1	12	.313
Chris Sale	2	2	2.79	58	0	8	71.0	52	22	22	6	27	79	.203
Hector Santiago	0	0	0.00	2	0	0	5.1	1	0	0	0	1	2	.059
Sergio Santos	4	5	3.55	63	0	30	63.1	41	25	25	6	29	92	.181
Zach Stewart	2	5	5.88	10	8	0	50.2	64	35	35	9	13	35	.314
Matt Thornton	2	5	3.32	62	0	3	59.2	60	34	22	3	21	63	.255
Team totals	79	83	4.10	162	162	42	1460.0	1463	706	665	147	439	1220	.261

== Farm system ==
Level	Team	League	Manager
AAA	Charlotte Knights	International League	Joe McEwing
AA	Birmingham Barons	Southern League	Bobby Magallanes
A	Winston-Salem Dash	Carolina League	Julio Vinas
A	Kannapolis Intimidators	South Atlantic League	Tommy Thompson
Rookie	Bristol White Sox	Appalachian League	Pete Rose Jr.
Rookie	Great Falls Voyagers	Pioneer League	Ryan Newman

LEAGUE CHAMPIONS: Great Falls
