= Brent Morel =

American baseball player (born 1987)

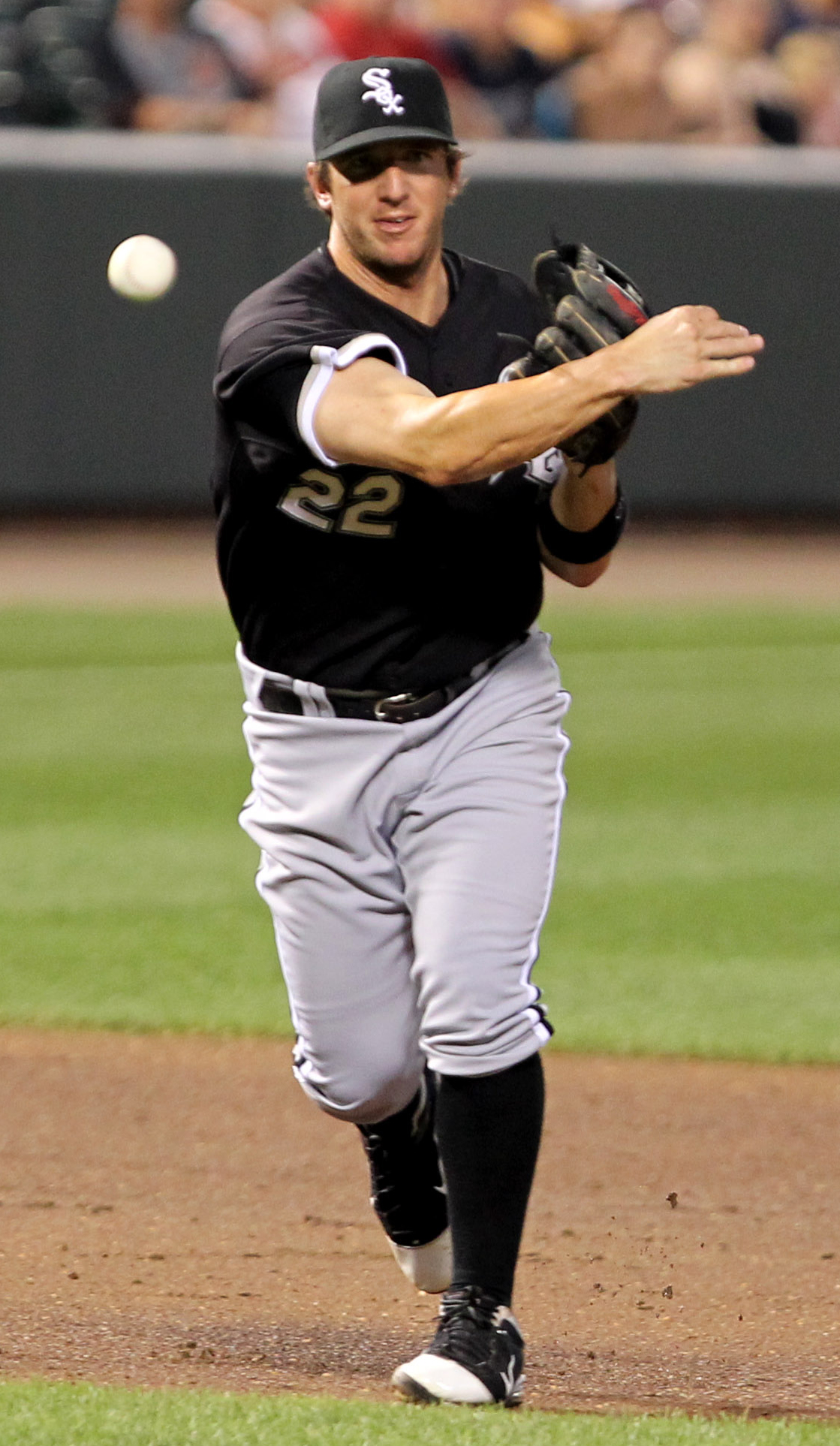
- Morel with the Chicago White Sox in 2011
- Third baseman
- Born: April 21, 1987 (age 38); Bakersfield, California, U.S.
- Batted: Right Threw: Right

Professional debut
- MLB: September 7, 2010, for the Chicago White Sox
- NPB: March 25, 2016, for the Orix Buffaloes

Last appearance
- MLB: July 24, 2015, for the Pittsburgh Pirates
- NPB: June 30, 2017, for the Orix Buffaloes

MLB statistics
- Batting average: .227
- Home runs: 13
- Runs batted in: 59

NPB statistics
- Batting average: .251
- Home runs: 9
- Runs batted in: 49
- Stats at Baseball Reference

Teams
- Chicago White Sox (2010–2013); Pittsburgh Pirates (2014–2015); Orix Buffaloes (2016–2017)

Brenton Andre Morel (born April 21, 1987) is an American former professional baseball third baseman. He played for the Chicago White Sox and Pittsburgh Pirates.

== Career ==
Morel attended Centennial High School in Bakersfield, California, and California Polytechnic State University in San Luis Obispo, California, where he played college baseball for the Cal Poly Mustangs.

=== Chicago White Sox ===
Morel was drafted by the Chicago White Sox in the third round of the 2008 Major League Baseball draft. He was called up to the majors for the first time on September 2, 2010. He had his first major league hit and home run in the same at bat on September 10 against Kansas City Royals pitcher Bruce Chen.

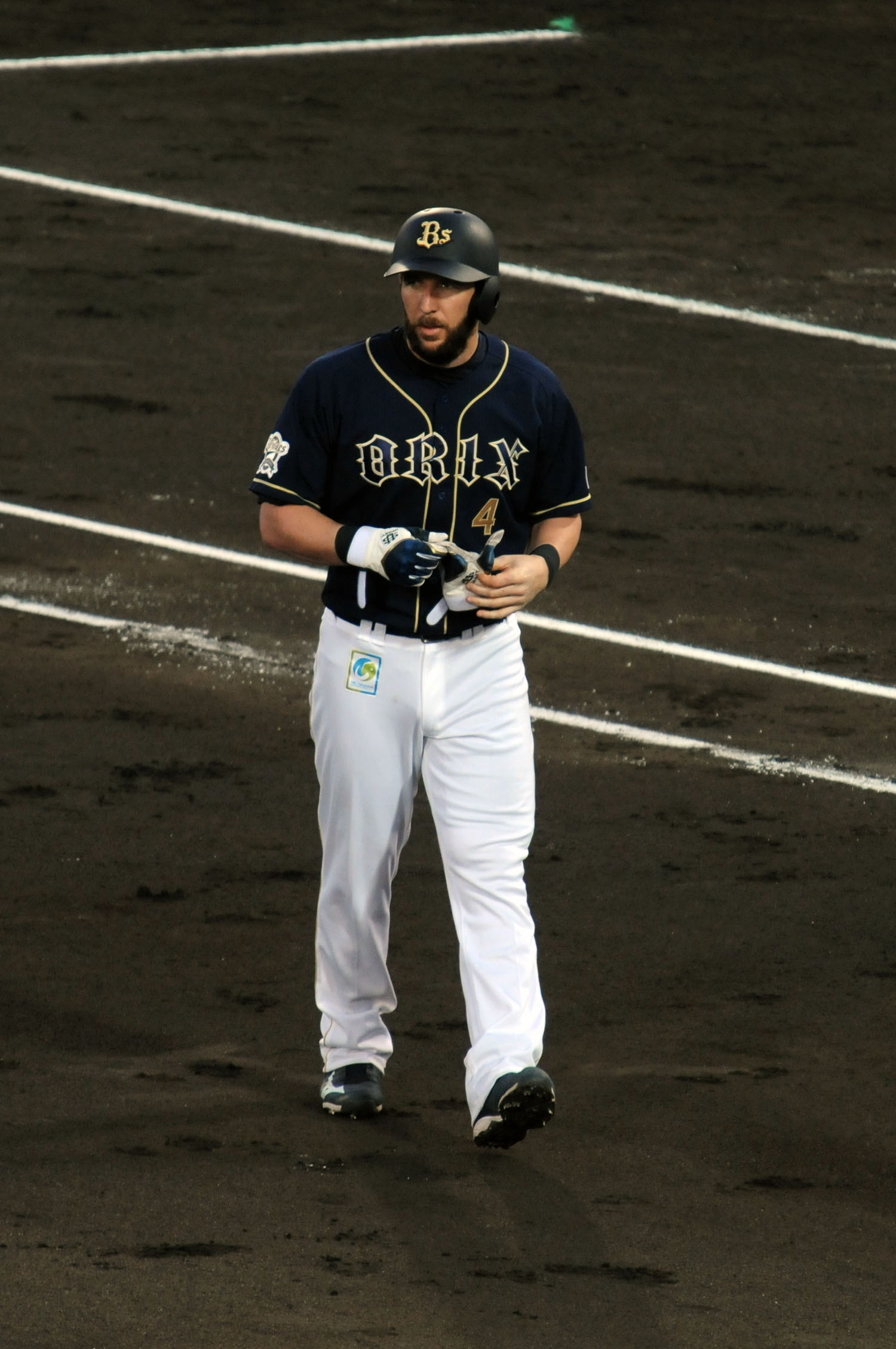
Morel with the Orix Buffaloes

=== Toronto Blue Jays ===
Morel was claimed off waivers by the Toronto Blue Jays on December 23, 2013. He was designated for assignment on February 21, 2014, to make room for Liam Hendriks.

=== Pittsburgh Pirates ===
Morel was claimed off waivers by the Pittsburgh Pirates on February 24, 2014. He was optioned to the Triple-A Indianapolis Indians on March 21, 2014. He was recalled on May 9, 2014. He was outrighted off the roster on November 20, 2014. On July 25, 2015, he was designated for assignment. Rather than accepting an outright assignment to Triple-A, he became a free agent.

=== Oakland Athletics ===
Morel signed a minor league contract with the Oakland Athletics on July 30, 2015. He played the rest of the 2015 season with the Triple-A Nashville Sounds and elected to become a free agent after the season.

=== Orix Buffaloes ===
Morel signed with the Orix Buffaloes of Nippon Professional Baseball for the 2016 season. He then signed again for the 2017 season.

On December 2, 2017, he became a free agent, and announced his retirement from professional baseball.
