= Jason Frasor =

American baseball player (born 1977)

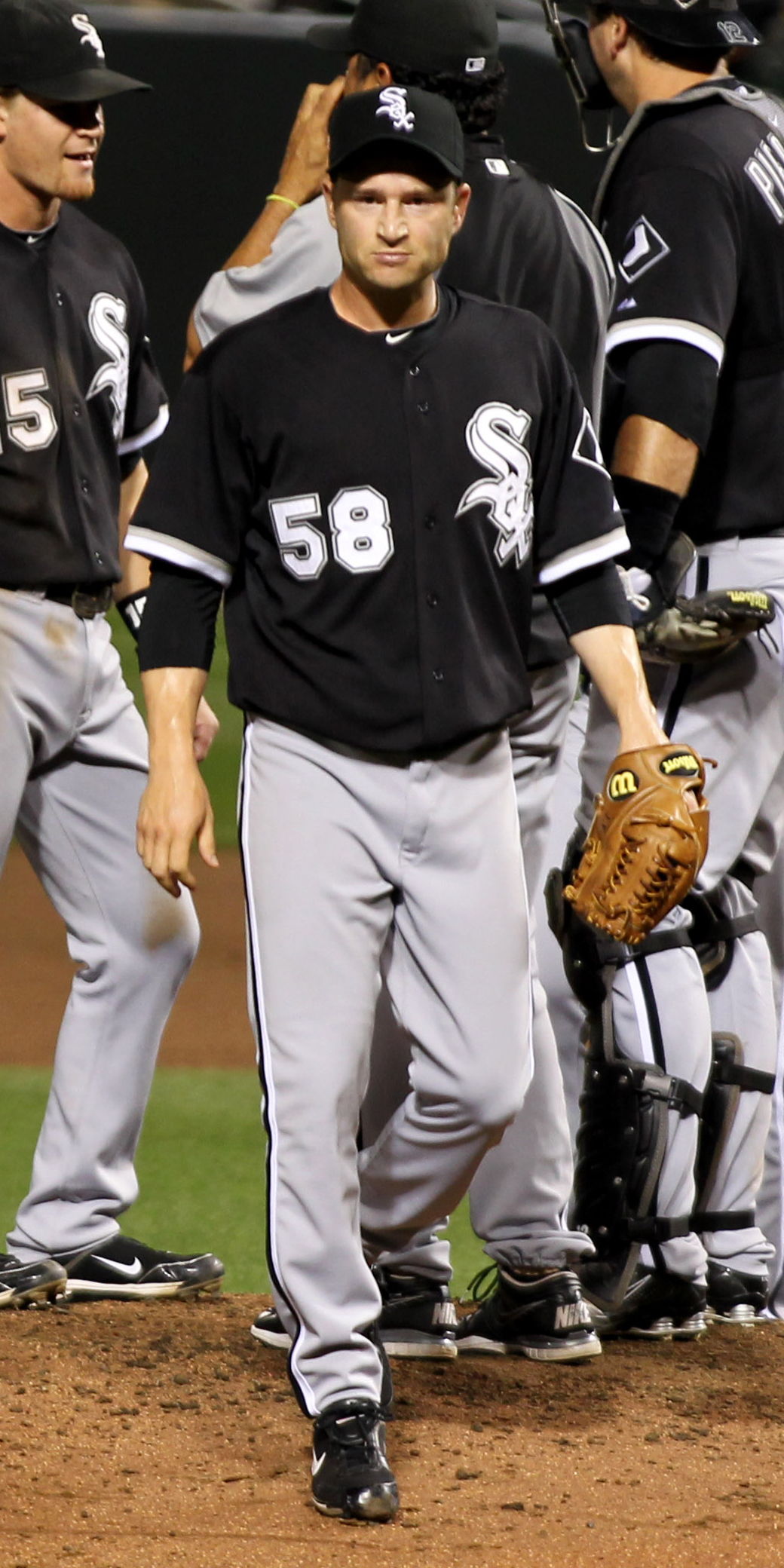
- Frasor with the Chicago White Sox
- Pitcher
- Born: August 9, 1977 (age 49); Chicago, Illinois, U.S.
- Batted: Right Threw: Right

MLB debut
- April 16, 2004, for the Toronto Blue Jays

Last MLB appearance
- August 1, 2015, for the Atlanta Braves

MLB statistics
- Win–loss record: 35–35
- Earned run average: 3.49
- Strikeouts: 615
- Stats at Baseball Reference

Teams
- Toronto Blue Jays (2004–2011); Chicago White Sox (2011); Toronto Blue Jays (2012); Texas Rangers (2013–2014); Kansas City Royals (2014–2015); Atlanta Braves (2015)

Jason Andrew Frasor (born August 9, 1977) is an American former professional baseball pitcher. He made his debut with the Toronto Blue Jays in 2004, recording a 4.08 ERA in 63 games that season. He would ultimately pitch in more than 500 games for the Blue Jays. He also played in MLB for the Chicago White Sox, Texas Rangers, Kansas City Royals and the Atlanta Braves, playing in the World Series for the Royals in 2014.

== Professional career ==
=== Toronto Blue Jays ===
A starter in the low minors from 1999 to 2002, he was converted to a reliever in 2003. The Blue Jays acquired him from the Los Angeles Dodgers prior to the 2004 season in exchange for Jayson Werth. He was sent to the minors on April 28, 2006, and recalled on May 11, 2006. On July 2, 2006, Frasor was demoted again to Triple-A; the Blue Jays recalled Shaun Marcum in his place.

On January 9, 2007, Frasor signed a one-year contract for the 2007 season with the Toronto Blue Jays, avoiding salary arbitration. The contract was worth $825,000 with cumulative incentives based upon games pitched.

Frasor began 2009 with a 4–0 record through early May, without allowing an earned run. This was one of the best marks in all of Major League Baseball, and helped the Blue Jays hold first place in the American League through the 2009 season's first 26 games.

On July 17, 2011, he made his 453rd appearance for the Blue Jays, passing Duane Ward to become the team's all-time appearance leader.

=== Chicago White Sox ===
On July 27, 2011, he was traded to the Chicago White Sox with Zach Stewart for Mark Teahen and Edwin Jackson.

=== Return to Toronto ===
On January 1, 2012, Frasor was traded back to the Toronto Blue Jays for pitching prospects Myles Jaye and Daniel Webb. On July 21, Frasor was placed on the disabled list retroactive to July 17 with right forearm tightness. He became a free agent following the season.

=== Texas Rangers ===
On January 3, 2013, Frasor signed a one-year deal with the Texas Rangers. Used as a middle reliever in his 61 games, he went 4–3 with a 2.57 ERA and 10 holds, striking out 48 in 49 innings with a .203 OBA.

On October 11, Frasor signed a one-year, $1.75 million deal with incentives to return to the Rangers.

=== Kansas City Royals ===
On July 16, 2014, the Rangers traded Frasor to Kansas City for pitcher Spencer Patton. He was designated for assignment on July 6, 2015, and released on July 13.

=== Atlanta Braves ===
On July 16, 2015, Frasor signed with the Atlanta Braves for the remainder of the 2015 season.

After spending time on the 15-day disabled list due to a right shoulder strain, Frasor was released on August 26, 2015.

== Personal life ==
Frasor attended Oak Forest High School, located in Oak Forest, Illinois and graduated in 1995 after starring for the Bengals as a starting pitcher, reliever and shortstop. He then played at Southern Illinois University, where he won the Richard "Itch" Jones award as the team MVP in 1997 and 1999.

Frasor is a cousin of former UNC backup point guard Bobby Frasor.

He married Laura Schmidt in 2008 and has two children.
