= Mark Teahen =

American-Canadian baseball player (born 1981)

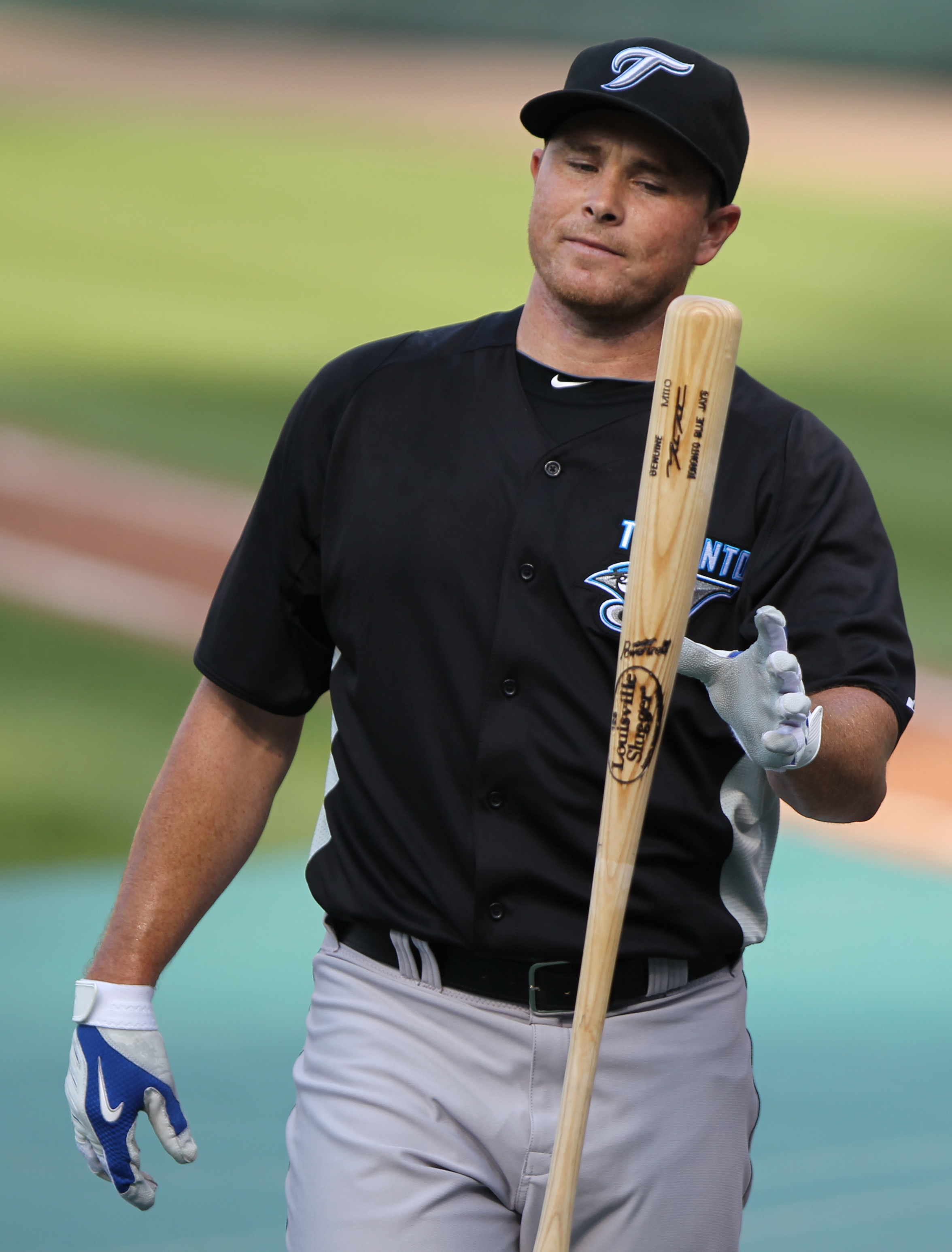
- Teahen with the Toronto Blue Jays
- Third baseman / Right fielder
- Born: September 6, 1981 (age 45); Redlands, California, U.S.
- Batted: Left Threw: Right

MLB debut
- April 4, 2005, for the Kansas City Royals

Last MLB appearance
- September 28, 2011, for the Toronto Blue Jays

MLB statistics
- Batting average: .264
- Home runs: 67
- Runs batted in: 332
- Stats at Baseball Reference

Teams
- Kansas City Royals (2005–2009); Chicago White Sox (2010–2011); Toronto Blue Jays (2011)

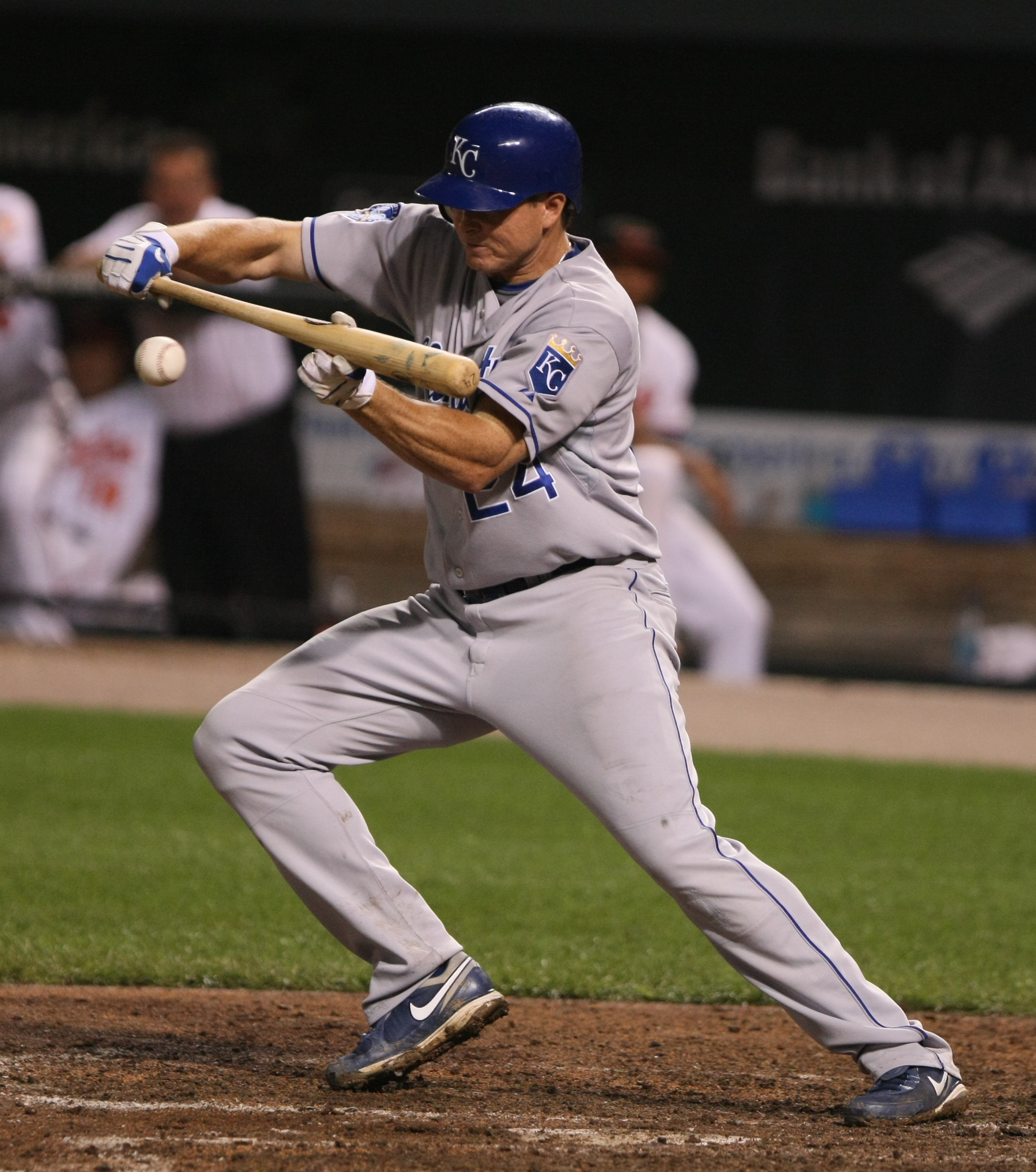
Teahen with the Kansas City Royals in 2009

Mark Thomas Teahen (born September 6, 1981) is an American-Canadian former professional baseball infielder who played in Major League Baseball (MLB) for the Kansas City Royals, Chicago White Sox, and Toronto Blue Jays.

He graduated from Yucaipa High School in 1999 and attended St. Mary's College in California. Teahen was drafted 39th overall in the 2002 draft by the Oakland Athletics with a sandwich pick between the first and second rounds. He was featured in the book Moneyball, which noted the Athletics considered that Teahen could have the potential to become the next Jason Giambi.

Prior to the 2009 World Baseball Classic, Teahen, whose father was born in St. Marys, Ontario, became a naturalized Canadian citizen and played for Team Canada in that event. In 2011, Teahen and Brett Lawrie both started in the infield for the Blue Jays, marking the first time they had two Canadians in the starting lineup.

== Professional career ==
=== Kansas City Royals ===
Oakland traded him to Kansas City in 2004, along with Mike Wood, as part of a three-way trade that sent Carlos Beltrán to the Houston Astros, Octavio Dotel from the Astros to the Athletics, and John Buck from the Astros to the Royals. Although he had been one of the most highly regarded prospects in the Oakland organization, he became available when the Athletics were able to sign Eric Chavez to a long-term contract.

Royals management did not expect Teahen to make the opening-day roster in 2005; however, after hitting .344 in spring training and after injuries sidelined potential third basemen Chris Truby and Chris Clapinski, the Royals announced Teahen would be their regular third baseman for 2005, and he made his major-league debut on April 4, 2005.

His first hit was a triple and he hit four homers in his last 17 games of 2005. Teahen hit .240 in his rookie season with KC. In 2006, he hit .290 with 18 home runs and 69 RBIs. During July, he raised his performance level with 10 home runs and 35 RBIs during the 38 games ending August 2. He continued to hit well, but suffered an injury and had to have season-ending surgery on September 8.

Going into the 2007 season, Teahen moved from third base to right field because of the arrival of young prospect Alex Gordon. His home run total dropped alarmingly to only seven homers, after hitting 18 the year prior. During the 2008 season, he hit two inside-the-park home runs (leading the majors), bringing his total for 2008 to 14 homers.

While in Kansas City, Teahen was a spokesman and fundraiser for a program that gave children with physical or mental challenges the chance to play baseball. Since Teahen obtained dual Canadian-American citizenship in 2005, he was able to play for the Canadian team in the 2009 World Baseball Classic. In 2009, he hit .271 with a career-high 34 doubles, 12 home runs and 50 RBI in 144 games with Kansas City. He made 99 starts at third base, 31 in right field and three at second.

=== Chicago White Sox ===
On November 5, 2009, Teahen was traded by the Royals to the Chicago White Sox in exchange for infielders Chris Getz and Josh Fields. He later received the 2009 Hutch Award for his efforts on and off the field.

On December 8, Teahen and the White Sox agreed to a three-year, $14 million deal.

=== Toronto Blue Jays ===
On July 27, 2011, Teahen was traded to the Toronto Blue Jays with Edwin Jackson for Jason Frasor and Zach Stewart. The Blue Jays designated him for assignment on January 9, 2012. He was released on January 17. In his one season with the Blue Jays, Teahen played in 27 games, mostly as a pinch hitter and defensive replacement, and hit .190 with one home run and three RBI.

=== 2012–2013 ===
Teahen signed a minor league contract with the Washington Nationals on February 6, 2012. Teahen spent the 2012 season with the Nationals Triple-A affiliate Syracuse Chiefs. According to the International League transactions page, Teahen declared free agency on November 2, 2012.

On November 26, 2012, Teahen signed a minor league contract with the Arizona Diamondbacks. He started the 2013 season with the Reno Aces, but was released by the Diamondbacks at his request on May 20.

The Texas Rangers signed Teahen to a minor league deal on May 23, 2013, and assigned him to the Triple-A Round Rock Express. He was released on June 3, 2013.

On June 17, 2013, he signed a contract to play for the York Revolution in the Atlantic League of Professional Baseball. In 78 games he hit .271/.355/.406 with 6 home runs, 30 RBIs and 1 stolen base.

Teahen signed a minor-league contract with the San Francisco Giants on February 15, 2014. This contract did not include an invitation to major league spring training. He was released on March 19.

On December 15, it was reported that Teahen had retired.

=== 2017 ===
On January 24, 2017, it was announced that Teahen would play in the Italian Baseball League after signing with the Padua team. In 33 games he struggled hitting .205/.375/.313 with 2 home runs, 14 RBIs and 3 stolen bases.

== Personal life ==
Mark married Lauren McClain on December 31, 2010. They have three children.
