= Zach Stewart =

American baseball player (born 1986)

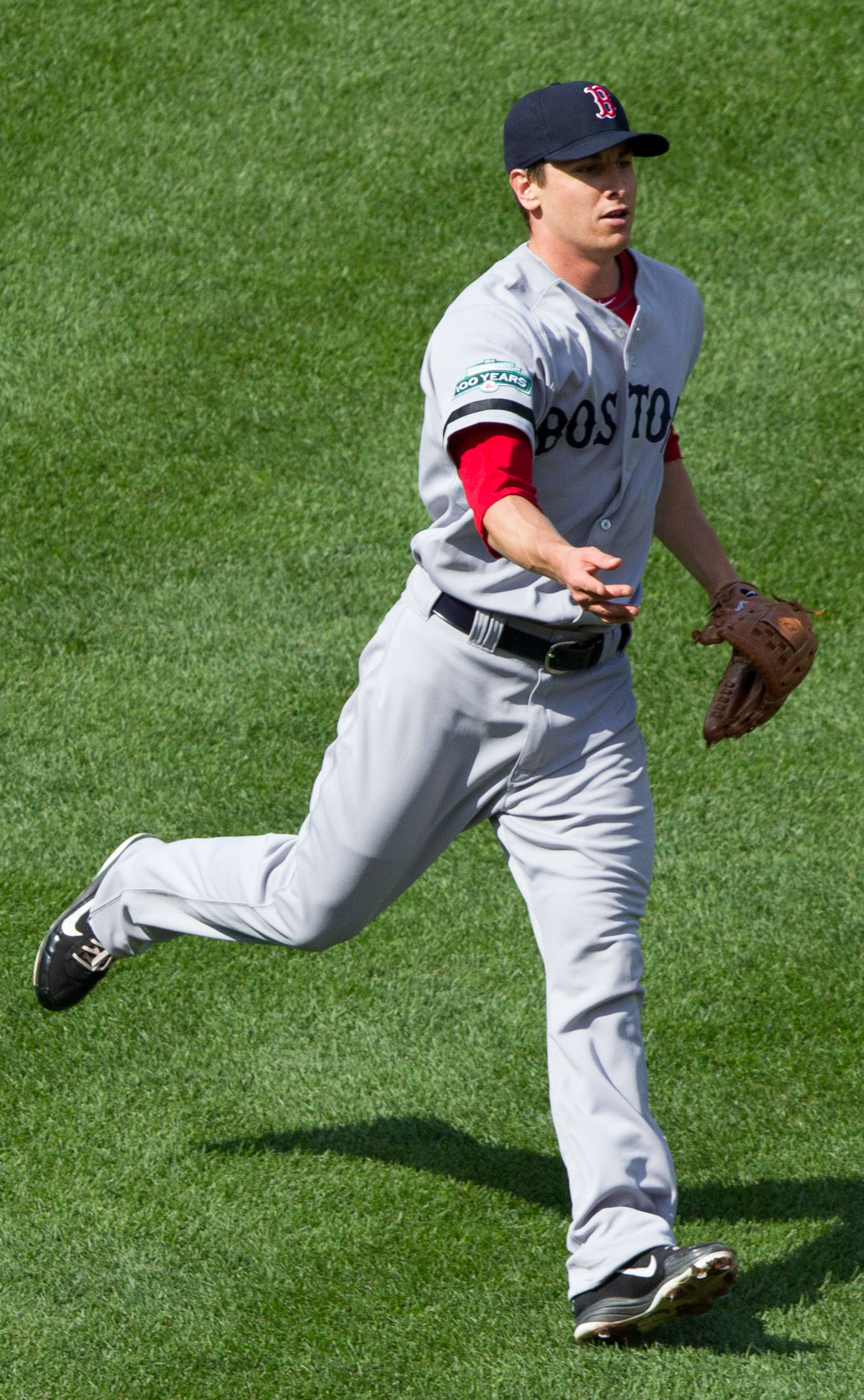
- Stewart with the Boston Red Sox
- Pitcher
- Born: September 28, 1986 (age 39); Wichita Falls, Texas, U.S.
- Batted: Right Threw: Right

Professional debut
- MLB: June 16, 2011, for the Toronto Blue Jays
- KBO: June 23, 2015, for the NC Dinos

Last appearance
- MLB: September 30, 2012, for the Boston Red Sox
- KBO: October 7, 2016, for the NC Dinos

MLB statistics
- Win–loss record: 3–10
- Earned run average: 6.82
- Strikeouts: 64

KBO statistics
- Win–loss record: 20–10
- Earned run average: 3.73
- Strikeouts: 227
- Stats at Baseball Reference

Teams
- Toronto Blue Jays (2011); Chicago White Sox (2011–2012); Boston Red Sox (2012); NC Dinos (2015–2016)

Zachary Robert Stewart (born September 28, 1986) is an American former professional baseball pitcher. He played in Major League Baseball (MLB) for the Toronto Blue Jays, Chicago White Sox, and Boston Red Sox, and in the KBO League for the NC Dinos.

== Amateur career ==
Stewart attended Holliday High School. He attended Angelo State University before transferring to North Central Texas College where he pitched in 2006 and 2007. He pitched for Texas Tech University in 2008. Stewart became the third former North Central Texas College player to debut in MLB, after Craig Stansberry and J. R. Towles.

== Professional career ==
=== Cincinnati Reds ===
Stewart was drafted by the Cincinnati Reds in the third round of the 2008 Major League Baseball draft out of Texas Tech University.

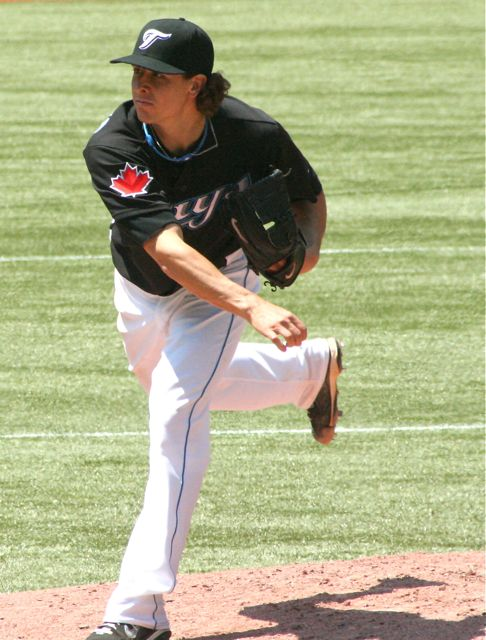
Stewart with the Blue Jays in 2011.

=== Toronto Blue Jays ===
On August 1, 2009, the Reds traded Stewart, along with Edwin Encarnación and Josh Roenicke, to the Toronto Blue Jays for Scott Rolen. He was the Toronto Blue Jays top prospect prior to the 2010 Toronto Blue Jays season according to Baseball America.

On June 14, 2011, Stewart was called up from the Double-A New Hampshire Fisher Cats to replace Kyle Drabek, who was optioned to the Triple-A Las Vegas 51s. He made his career debut on June 16, 2011, against the Baltimore Orioles, pitching 7 innings, giving up 7 hits, 2 earned runs, 1 walk and 4 strikeouts. After making 3 starts, Stewart was optioned back to Double-A New Hampshire on June 28, 2011.

=== Chicago White Sox ===
On July 27, 2011, Stewart was traded to the Chicago White Sox with Jason Frasor for Edwin Jackson and Mark Teahen. Stewart was called up to the White Sox on August 6, 2011, and earned his first MLB victory going 6.1 innings giving up 1 run on 8 hits striking out 2 in a 6–1 victory over the Minnesota Twins.

On September 5, 2011, Stewart threw 7 perfect innings before giving up a hit to Minnesota Twins infielder Danny Valencia. Stewart then went on to retire the next six batters as the White Sox swept a double header winning 4–0.

=== Boston Red Sox ===
On June 24, 2012, Stewart was traded to the Boston Red Sox with Brent Lillibridge for Kevin Youkilis and cash. He was sent to the Triple-A Pawtucket Red Sox. Stewart was recalled from Pawtucket on August 29 in order to start that night against the Los Angeles Angels. The next day, Stewart was sent back to Pawtucket to make room for Daniel Bard. On November 20, Stewart was designated for assignment with four others.

=== Pittsburgh Pirates ===
On November 28, 2012, the Pittsburgh Pirates announced that they had acquired Stewart from the Red Sox in exchange for a player to be named later. The Pirates sent pitcher Kyle Kaminska to the Red Sox to complete the trade. The Pirates designated Stewart for assignment on January 17, 2013.

=== Chicago White Sox (second stint) ===
Stewart was claimed by the Chicago White Sox on January 24, 2013. Stewart spent the 2013 season with the Triple-A Charlotte Knights.

=== Atlanta Braves ===
Stewart was traded to the Atlanta Braves on March 10, 2014, in exchange for cash considerations. he started the 2014 season with the Triple-A Gwinnett Braves.

=== Los Angeles Angels of Anaheim ===
On January 27, 2015, Stewart signed a minor league contract with the Los Angeles Angels of Anaheim.

=== NC Dinos ===
On June 10, 2015, Stewart signed a contract with the NC Dinos.

=== Baltimore Orioles ===
On January 6, 2017, Stewart signed a minor league contract with the Baltimore Orioles. In 7 games (3 starts) for the Triple–A Norfolk Tides, he struggled to an 0–3 record and 7.41 ERA with 13 strikeouts across 17 innings pitched. On May 3, Stewart was released by the Orioles organization.

=== New Britain Bees ===
On March 20, 2018, Stewart signed with the New Britain Bees of the independent Atlantic League of Professional Baseball.

=== Toronto Blue Jays (second stint) ===
On July 5, 2018, Stewart signed a minor league contract with the Toronto Blue Jays. In 14 games for the Triple–A Buffalo Bisons, he recorded a 4.98 ERA with 19 strikeouts across 34 1/3 innings pitched. Stewart elected free agency following the season on November 2.

=== New Britain Bees (second stint) ===
On March 19, 2019, Stewart signed with the New Britain Bees of the Atlantic League of Professional Baseball. On May 21, 2019, Stewart announced his retirement from professional baseball.

== Post-playing career ==
=== Toronto Blue Jays ===
Through 2020, Stewart was an assistant coach in the Toronto Blue Jays organization.

=== Glacier Range Riders ===
On January 26, 2023, the Glacier Range Riders of the Pioneer League hired Stewart to serve as their pitching coach.
