= Edwin Jackson (baseball) =

American baseball player (born 1983)

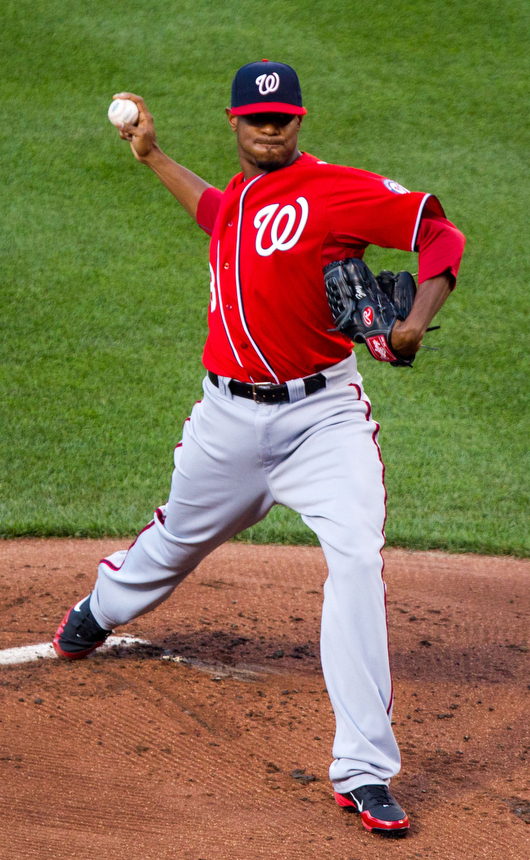
- Jackson with the Washington Nationals in 2012
- Pitcher
- Born: September 9, 1983 (age 42); Neu-Ulm, Bavaria, West Germany
- Batted: Right Threw: Right

MLB debut
- September 9, 2003, for the Los Angeles Dodgers

Last MLB appearance
- September 28, 2019, for the Detroit Tigers

MLB statistics
- Win–loss record: 107–133
- Earned run average: 4.78
- Strikeouts: 1,508
- Stats at Baseball Reference

Teams
- Los Angeles Dodgers (2003–2005); Tampa Bay Devil Rays / Rays (2006–2008); Detroit Tigers (2009); Arizona Diamondbacks (2010); Chicago White Sox (2010–2011); St. Louis Cardinals (2011); Washington Nationals (2012); Chicago Cubs (2013–2015); Atlanta Braves (2015); Miami Marlins (2016); San Diego Padres (2016); Baltimore Orioles (2017); Washington Nationals (2017); Oakland Athletics (2018); Toronto Blue Jays (2019); Detroit Tigers (2019)

Career highlights and awards
- All-Star (2009); World Series champion (2011); Pitched a no-hitter on June 25, 2010
Medals
Men's baseball
Representing United States
Olympic Games
Silver medal – second place	2020 Tokyo	Team

Edwin Jackson Jr. (born September 9, 1983) is an American former professional baseball pitcher. He played in Major League Baseball (MLB) from 2003 to 2019 for the Los Angeles Dodgers, Tampa Bay Devil Rays / Rays, Detroit Tigers, Arizona Diamondbacks, Chicago White Sox, St. Louis Cardinals, Washington Nationals, Chicago Cubs, Atlanta Braves, Miami Marlins, San Diego Padres, Baltimore Orioles, Oakland Athletics, and Toronto Blue Jays.

Jackson has played for more MLB teams than any other player, having played for his 14th club, the Blue Jays, in 2019, passing the record previously held by Octavio Dotel and since tied by Rich Hill. Jackson was an All-Star in 2009, threw a no-hitter on June 25, 2010, and was a member of the 2011 World Series champion Cardinals.

== Early life ==
Jackson was born in Neu Ulm, Germany while his father, Edwin Jackson Sr., was serving in the United States Army there. He is one of 27 major league players who were born in Germany. He spent three of the first eight years of his life in Germany, had a few years in Louisiana, before spending the rest of his youth in Columbus, Georgia. Jackson attended Shaw High School in Columbus, Georgia from 1997 to 2001. While attending Shaw High School, Jackson played outfield for the Raider baseball team. His senior year, Jackson helped lead the Raiders baseball team to the 2001 GHSA AAAA State Championship title over Columbus High School in Columbus, Georgia.

== Professional career ==
=== Los Angeles Dodgers (2003–2005) ===
The Los Angeles Dodgers selected Jackson in the sixth round of the 2001 MLB draft. He was originally drafted as an outfielder but the Dodgers converted him into a pitcher. There was a time when Jackson was regarded as one of the premier pitching prospects in baseball (after posting sub-4.00 earned run averages (ERAs) in AA and the majors at age 19 in 2003), but poor showings in AAA and MLB after that season ended his status as a "can't-miss" prospect. He made his major league debut on September 9, 2003, his 20th birthday. In that game, he pitched six innings, giving up one run and out-pitching Cy Young Award-winner Randy Johnson to earn his first career major league victory.

=== Tampa Bay Rays (2006–2008) ===
On January 14, 2006, Jackson and left-handed pitcher Chuck Tiffany were traded to Tampa Bay for pitchers Danys Báez and Lance Carter. In 2006, Jackson pitched in 23 games, mostly in middle relief, and posted a 5.45 ERA in 36 1/3 innings.

In 2007, Jackson became a full-time starter for the Rays. He began the season poorly, going 1–9 with a 7.23 ERA in 17 games over 74 2/3 innings. Jackson managed to rebound somewhat after the All-Star break, posting a 4–6 record and a 4.48 ERA over 15 games, all of them starts. His season highlight came in a start against the Texas Rangers on August 11, in which he recorded a shutout, allowing only four hits and one walk while striking out eight. Jackson finished the season with a 5–15 record and an ERA of 5.76.

In 2008, Jackson assumed the number four spot in the Rays' starting rotation out of spring training. He finished the season with a 4.42 ERA. Jackson tied with James Shields to lead the Rays with 14 victories, which also tied the record for most wins by a Rays pitcher.

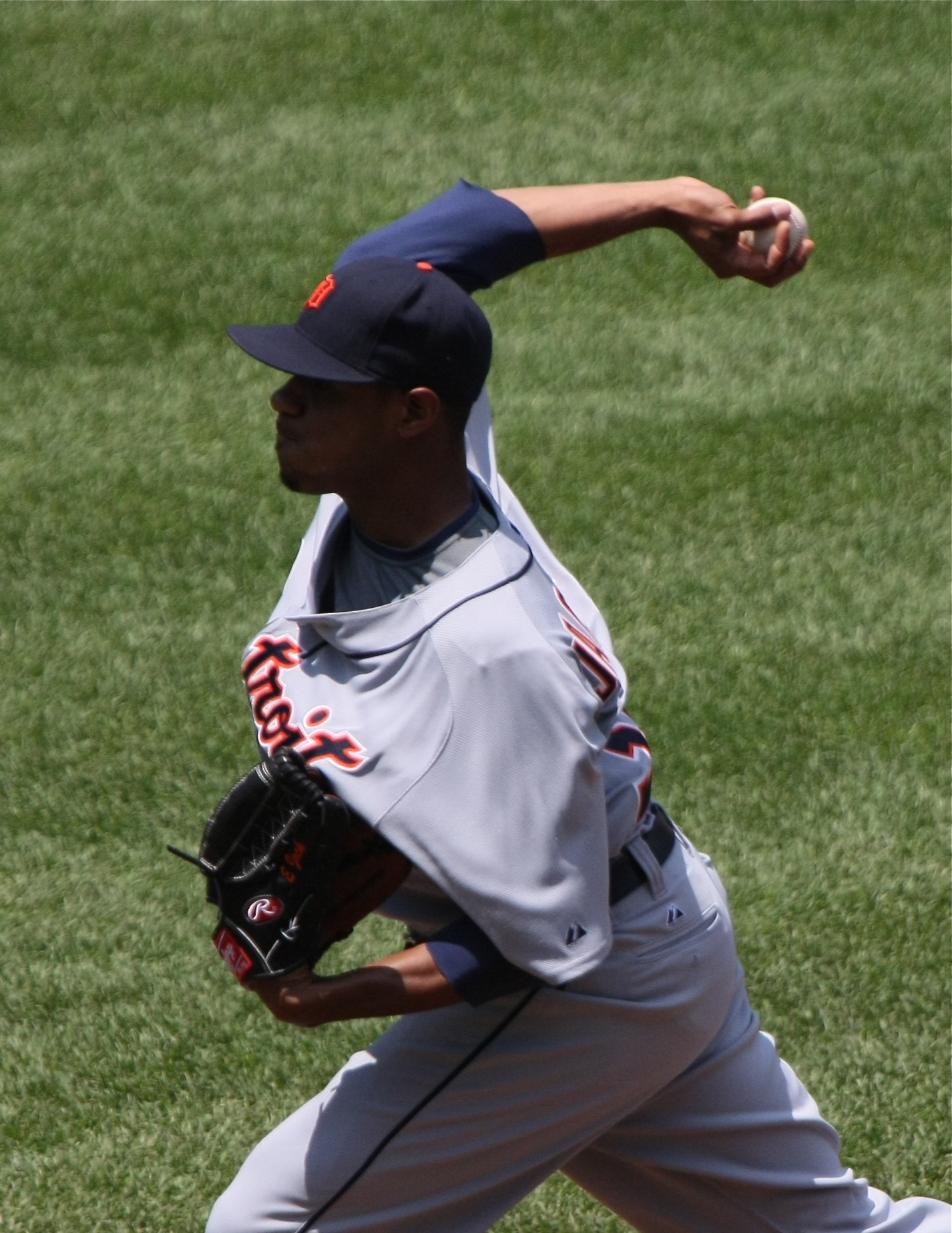
Jackson pitching for the Tigers in 2009

=== Detroit Tigers (2009) ===
On December 10, 2008, Jackson was traded to the Detroit Tigers in exchange for outfielder Matt Joyce.

Jackson made his Tigers debut on April 7, 2009, against the Toronto Blue Jays. He allowed one run in 7 1/3 innings, and received a no decision in Detroit's 5–4 loss. He earned his first victory with Detroit on April 18 against the Seattle Mariners, pitching 7 2/3 scoreless innings.

Jackson was selected to represent Detroit in the 2009 All-Star Game along with teammates Curtis Granderson, Justin Verlander, and Brandon Inge. He pitched a scoreless fifth inning for the AL, retiring Yadier Molina, Ryan Zimmerman, and Hanley Ramírez on four pitches.

At the end of July, opposing batters were hitting .216 against him, which was the lowest batting average in the league; he was followed by Matt Garza (.222), Jarrod Washburn (.224), and Scott Feldman (.228).

=== Arizona Diamondbacks (2010) ===
On December 9, 2009, Jackson was traded to the Arizona Diamondbacks as part of a three team trade that brought Austin Jackson, Phil Coke, Max Scherzer, and Daniel Schlereth to the Tigers. Jackson hit his first Major League home run off Jack Taschner and scored the first two runs of his career in the fourth inning of a game against the Pittsburgh Pirates on April 11, 2010.

On June 25, 2010, Jackson no-hit his former team, the Tampa Bay Rays, 1–0, at Tropicana Field, becoming the first pitcher to no-hit a former team since Philadelphia Phillie Terry Mulholland no-hit the San Francisco Giants in 1990. It was only the second no-hitter in Diamondbacks' history, the other being Randy Johnson's perfect game on May 18, 2004, as well as the fourth of the 2010 season, and the third time the Rays had been no-hit in less than 12 months. Jackson's 149-pitch performance included eight walks and a hit batter, and was aided by the defensive performances of Mark Reynolds, Tony Abreu, and Adam LaRoche (whose second-inning home run accounted for the game's only run). Jackson became the first German-born pitcher to throw a no-hitter, the first African American to do so since Dwight Gooden in 1996, and the first African American to do so for a National League team since Bob Gibson in 1971.

=== Chicago White Sox (2010–2011) ===
On July 30, 2010, the Diamondbacks traded Jackson to the Chicago White Sox for Daniel Hudson and David Holmberg.

When the Diamondbacks traded Jackson to the White Sox, he became the first pitcher in the Majors to be traded away in the same season that he pitched a no-hitter since Cliff Chambers pitched a no-hitter for the Pittsburgh Pirates against the Boston Braves in 1951.

=== St. Louis Cardinals (2011) ===
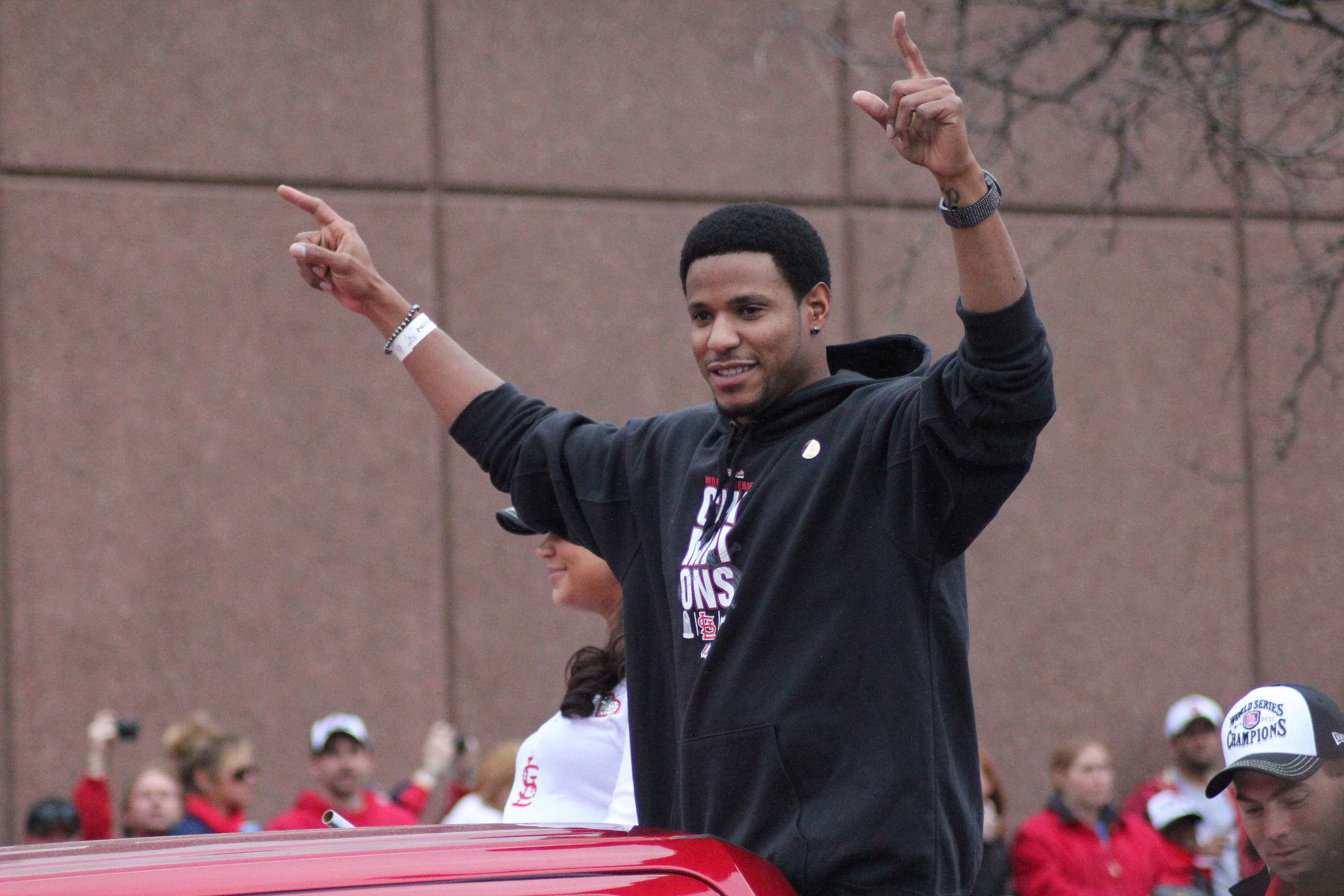
Jackson during the 2011 World Series victory parade

On July 27, 2011, Jackson was traded to the Toronto Blue Jays with Mark Teahen for Jason Frasor and Zach Stewart. The Blue Jays then traded Jackson to the St. Louis Cardinals later that day, along with Octavio Dotel, Marc Rzepczynski and Corey Patterson for Colby Rasmus, P. J. Walters, Trever Miller and Brian Tallet.

On July 29, 2011, Jackson pitched his first game as a Cardinal and threw seven strong innings, leading St. Louis to a 9–2 win over the rival Chicago Cubs.

Over 13 regular-season appearances for St. Louis in 2011, Jackson pitched 78 innings in which he struck out 51 batters and walked 23. He allowed 91 hits and 37 runs (31 earned) to accrue a regular-season ERA of 3.58 with the Cardinals. In four postseason starts during St. Louis' successful march to the 2011 World Championship, Jackson posted a 5.60 ERA, issuing 19 hits, nine bases on balls and 11 runs (all earned), including four home runs, over 17 2/3 innings.

Jackson declined a one-year salary arbitration offer from the Cardinals for the 2012 season, becoming a free agent in December 2011.

=== Washington Nationals (2012) ===
On February 2, 2012, Jackson agreed to a one-year contract with the Nationals. The contract was reported to be worth $11 million and to contain incentive bonuses for achievements such as postseason awards. Jackson went 10–11 with the Nationals with an ERA of 4.03. He became a free agent after the Nationals' elimination from the playoffs.

=== Chicago Cubs (2013–2015) ===
On January 2, 2013, Jackson signed a 4-year, $52 million contract with the Chicago Cubs. On April 14, he along with Michael Bowden broke the record for most wild pitches in an inning, with 5. He finished the year 8–18 with a 4.98 ERA.

The 2014 season was even more dismal for Jackson. He finished the season with a 6–15 record, a 6.33 ERA over 140 2/3 IP, and allowed opponents a .302 against him. Over the course of his final 9 starts, Jackson posted a 1–6 record with a 9.95 ERA. His final start against the Los Angeles Dodgers saw him give up 5 earned runs in just 2/3 of an inning, leading to his subsequent demotion to the bullpen for the remainder of the year.

Jackson entered 2015 competing for a spot in the starting rotation with Travis Wood, but lost after giving up 9 earned runs in 16 1/3 innings. He began the season as the long reliever in the Cubs bullpen. On July 19, the Cubs designated him for assignment. On July 27, the Cubs released Jackson, eating the $13 million remaining on his contract. The team also owed him the same amount through the 2016 season.

=== Atlanta Braves (2015) ===
On August 14, Jackson signed a contract with the Atlanta Braves for the remainder of the 2015 season. He made his first appearance with the Braves the next day. Jackson recorded his first career save in relief of Matt Wisler on October 4, 2015, the final day of the season.

=== Miami Marlins (2016) ===
On January 13, 2016, Jackson signed a one-year contract for $507,500 with the Miami Marlins. He was designated for assignment on May 31, 2016, when the team activated Mike Dunn from the disabled list.

=== San Diego Padres (2016) ===
After signing a minor-league contract with the Padres in June 2016, Jackson was called up and made his first start as a Padre on July 17, 2016.

=== Baltimore Orioles (2017) ===
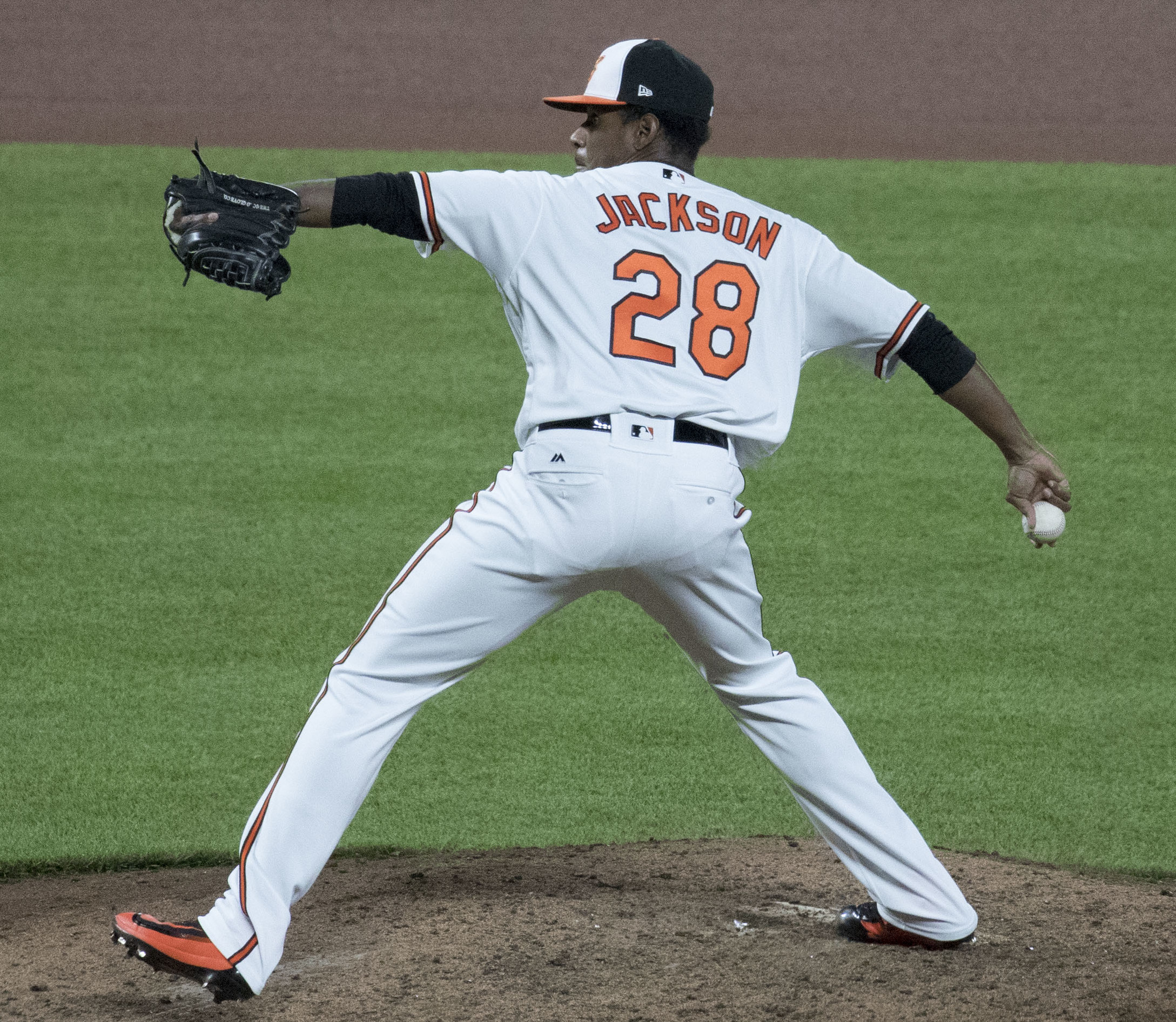
Jackson with the Orioles in 2017

On April 5, 2017, Jackson signed a minor-league contract with the Orioles. He was called up to the Orioles from AAA Norfolk on June 7, 2017. He pitched in 3 games for the Orioles for a total of 5 innings, giving up 11 hits and 7 runs. Jackson was designated for assignment on June 11 and elected free agency two days later.

=== Return to Washington (2017–2018) ===
On June 16, 2017, Jackson signed a minor-league contract with the Nationals, making this his second stint with the franchise. After several outings with the Class-AAA Syracuse Chiefs, allowing just one earned run in 20 1/3 innings of work, Jackson was promoted to the Nationals' major league roster to take injured starter Joe Ross' rotation spot for a July 18 start against the Los Angeles Angels of Anaheim. Jackson earned the 4–3 win, spinning seven innings of three-hit ball and allowing his only runs on solo home runs by Mike Trout and Martín Maldonado, and manager Dusty Baker said he would continue starting for Washington. He resigned a minor-league contract on January 11, 2018. He was assigned to AAA Syracuse Chiefs for the 2018 season. On June 1, 2018, the Nationals released Jackson from his minor-league contract after he opted out.

=== Oakland Athletics (2018) ===
Jackson signed a minor-league contract with the Oakland Athletics on June 6, 2018, and was assigned to the AAA Nashville Sounds. He was called up to start for the Athletics on June 25, tying a Major League record of having played for thirteen different teams. Jackson earned his 100th career victory on July 30, 2018, in a 10–1 win over the Blue Jays.

=== Toronto Blue Jays (2019) ===
On May 11, 2019, Jackson was traded to the Toronto Blue Jays in exchange for cash considerations. On May 15, 2019, Jackson made a start against the San Francisco Giants, becoming the first player ever to play for 14 different teams in MLB. Jackson posted an 11.12 ERA through eight games (five starts). On July 16, 2019, he was designated for assignment. On July 20, 2019, Jackson was released.

=== Return to Detroit Tigers (2019) ===
On July 22, 2019, Jackson signed a minor-league contract with the Detroit Tigers and assigned him to the Triple-A Toledo Mud Hens. In two starts for the Mud Hens, Jackson allowed five earned runs on 11 hits in 7 2/3 innings, two strikeouts and four walks. On August 9, the Tigers selected Jackson's contract from the Mud Hens and promoted him to the majors. Jackson recorded an 8.47 ERA in 10 appearances with the team. Jackson became a free agent following the 2019 season.

=== Return to Arizona Diamondbacks (2020) ===
On February 2, 2020, Jackson signed a minor-league contract with the Arizona Diamondbacks. Jackson did not play in a game in 2020 due to the cancellation of the minor league season because of the COVID-19 pandemic. He was released by the Diamondbacks organization on May 22.

=== High Point Rockers (2021) ===
On July 15, 2021, Jackson signed with the High Point Rockers of the Atlantic League of Professional Baseball, to help prepare for the 2020 Summer Olympics (contested in 2021). He appeared in 1 game, pitching a scoreless inning out of the bullpen.

On September 10, 2022, Jackson announced his retirement.

== International career ==
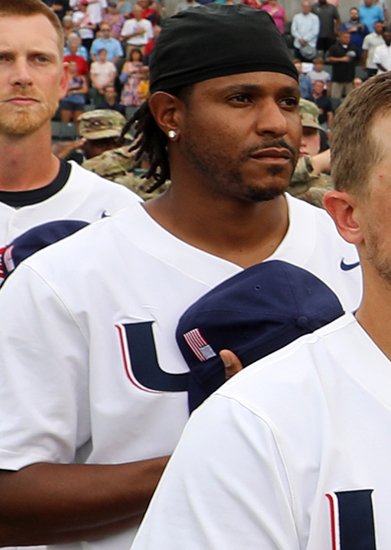
Jackson with the United States national baseball team in 2021

In May 2021, Jackson was named to the roster of the United States national baseball team for qualifying for baseball at the 2020 Summer Olympics. After the team qualified, he was named to the Olympics roster on July 2. The team went on to win silver, falling to Japan in the gold-medal game.

== Pitching style ==
Jackson was one of a minority of MLB starting pitchers who relied almost exclusively on two pitches, a mid-90s fastball and an effective power slider. His four-seam fastball had good velocity, averaging about 95 mph. He also had a two-seamer with similar velocity. His primary weapon against right-handed hitters was a hard slurve in the upper 80s. Against left-handed hitters, he often used a changeup (85–89) and occasionally a curveball (78–81).

== See also ==
- List of Arizona Diamondbacks no-hitters
- List of Major League Baseball no-hitters
- List of Olympic medalists in baseball
- List of people from Columbus, Georgia
- List of World Series starting pitchers

Achievements
Preceded by Roy Halladay	No-hitter pitcher June 25, 2010	Succeeded by Matt Garza
