= Chris Getz =

American baseball player (born 1983)

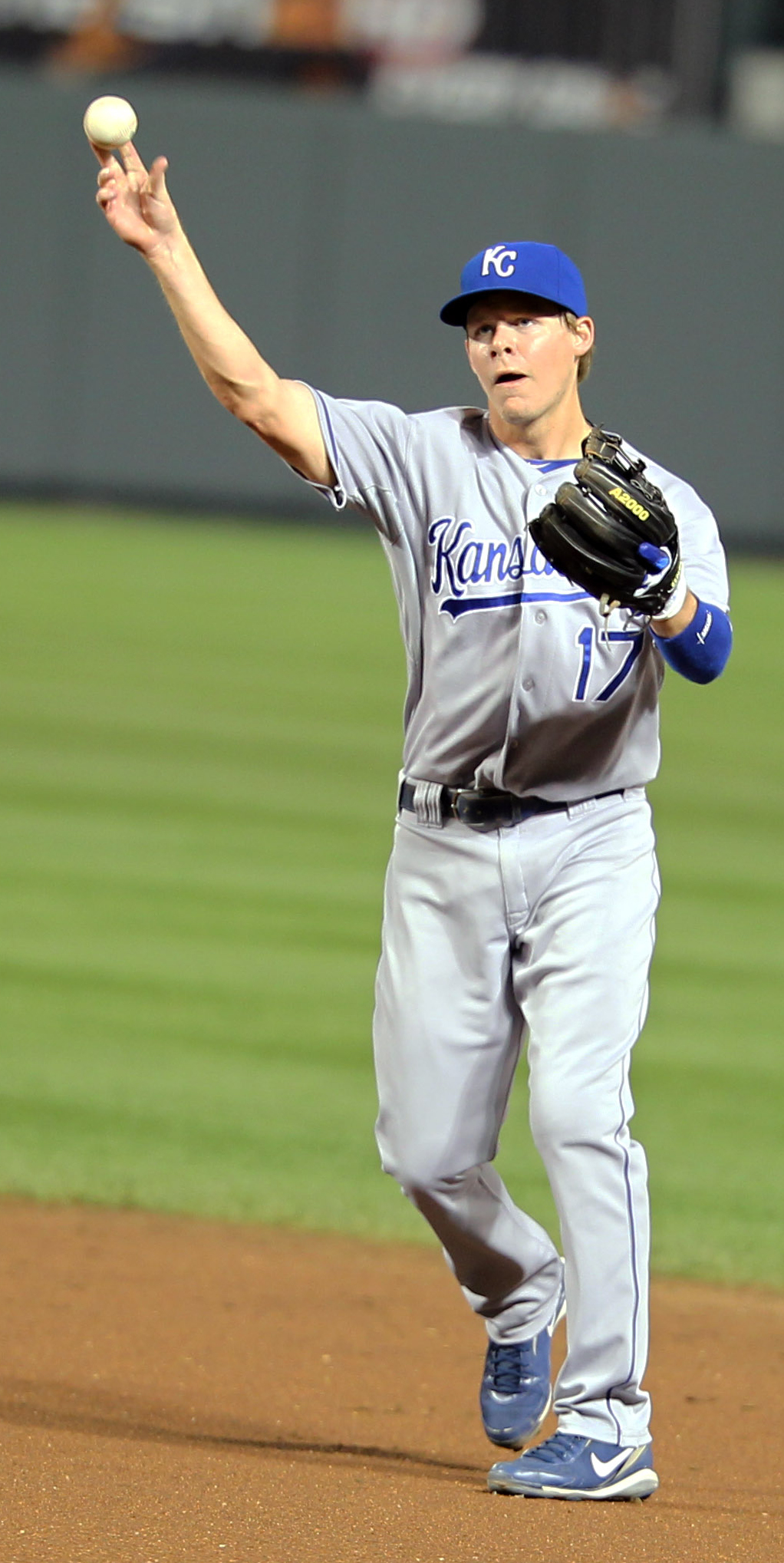
- Getz with the Kansas City Royals

Chicago White Sox
- General manager / second baseman
- Born: August 30, 1983 (age 42); Southfield, Michigan, U.S.
- Batted: Left Threw: Right

MLB debut
- August 12, 2008, for the Chicago White Sox

Last MLB appearance
- May 10, 2014, for the Toronto Blue Jays

MLB statistics
- Batting average: .250
- Home runs: 3
- Runs batted in: 111
- Stats at Baseball Reference

Teams
- As player: Chicago White Sox (2008–2009); Kansas City Royals (2010–2013); Toronto Blue Jays (2014); As general manager: Chicago White Sox (2023–present)

Christopher Ryan Getz (born August 30, 1983) is an American professional baseball executive and former player. A second baseman, Getz played in Major League Baseball for the Chicago White Sox, Kansas City Royals and Toronto Blue Jays from 2008 to 2014. Getz currently serves as the vice president and general manager for the White Sox.

== Early life ==
Getz was born in the Detroit suburb of Southfield, Michigan, and was raised in Grosse Pointe, Michigan by Art and Betsy Getz. He attended Grosse Pointe South High School, where he was a three-time All-Michigan selection in baseball and holds the South career records for batting average (.465), doubles, stolen bases, walks, and saves. Getz was a member of South's State Championship baseball team during his junior year. He shared the title of "Michigan's Mr. Baseball" in 2002 and also lettered in football and golf. Getz was drafted in the sixth round (180th overall) of the 2002 MLB draft by the Chicago White Sox, but opted to play baseball at Wake Forest University, where his father attended college.

Getz transferred to the University of Michigan to play baseball after just one season. He holds the single season Big Ten records for at-bats, hits, and was an All Big Ten Selection in 2004 and 2005. Getz also was a player in the Cape Cod Baseball League (CCBL), a premier collegiate summer baseball league for major league prospects. In 2003 and 2004, Getz played for the CCBL's Chatham A's, now known as the Chatham Anglers, and was named a league all-star in 2004.

== Professional career ==
=== Chicago White Sox ===
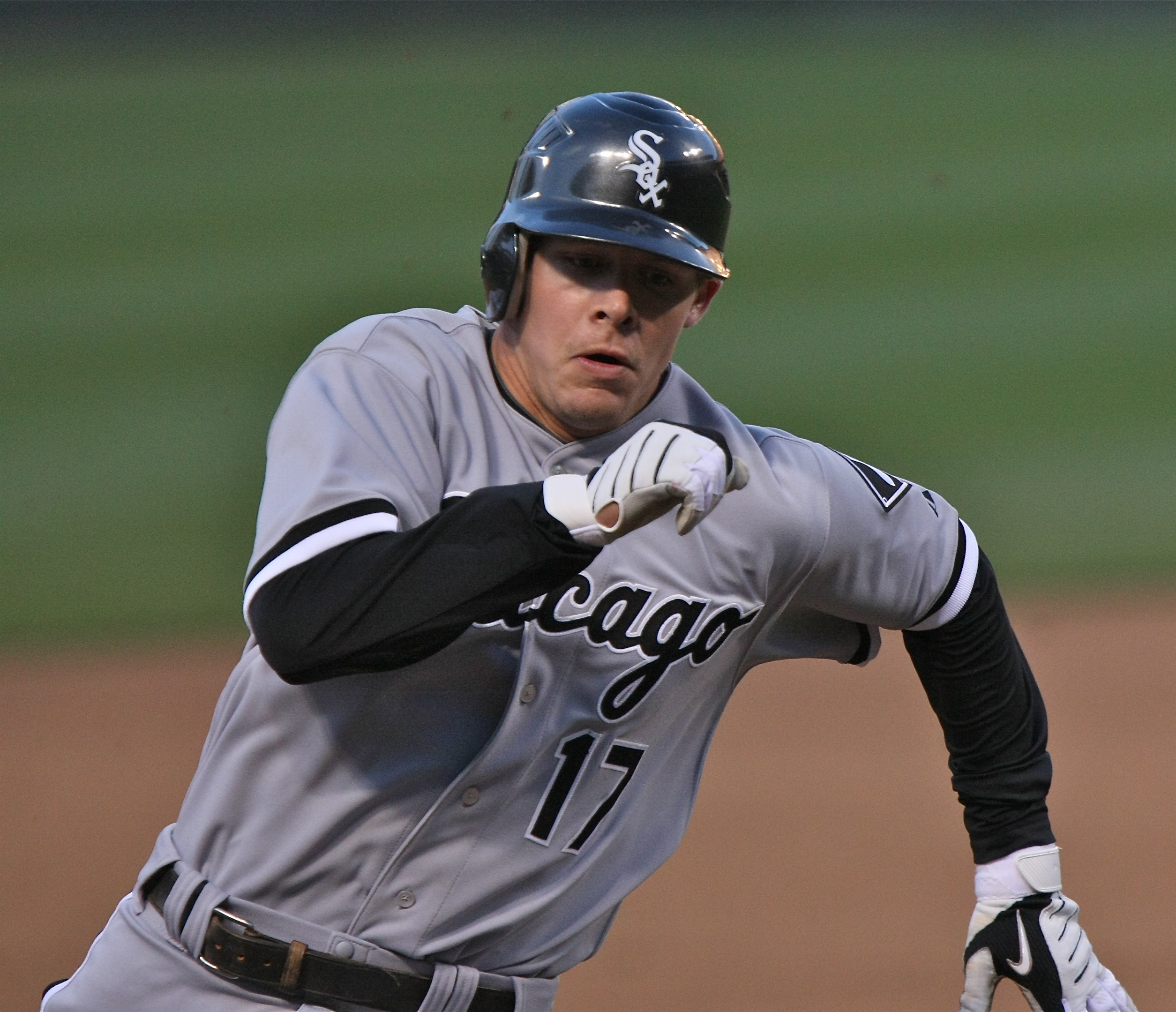
Chris Getz with the Chicago White Sox in 2009

Getz was again selected by the White Sox in the fourth round (125th overall) of the 2005 MLB draft. In 2005, he played six games for the Great Falls White Sox, the Sox rookie league affiliate, batting .333 with 4 RBI. He was later promoted to the Single-A Kannapolis Intimidators, where he played in 55 games and batted .307 with a home run and 28 RBI. In 2006, Getz played in 130 games for the Double-A Birmingham Barons, and hit .256 with two home runs and 36 RBI. Limited by injury, Getz played in just 72 games for Birmingham during the 2007 season, batting .299 with three home runs and 29 RBI.

In 2008, Getz was named to the All-Star Futures Game, then was called up to the White Sox on August 10, 2008. He made his major league debut against the Kansas City Royals on August 12, where he recorded his first hit and RBI off Royals pitcher Josh Newman in his one and only at-bat during the eighth inning. The next day, he had his first Major League start, replacing Alexei Ramírez at second base. He went 1-for-3 with a single.

With Ramirez moving over to shortstop for the 2009 season, White Sox manager Ozzie Guillén announced Getz had won the starting role at second base out of spring training. In 2009, Getz ranked tied for first among AL rookies in multi-hit games (28) and 92.6 stolen base percentage (25-for-27) led the league. After the season, he was named 2009 Topps All-Star Rookie Roster.

=== Kansas City Royals ===
Getz was traded to the Kansas City Royals on November 6, 2009, along with Josh Fields for Mark Teahen. His career with the Royals was riddled with injuries. He played only 72 games during the 2010 season due first to a strained oblique muscle, and then later due to a concussion after being hit in the head with a baseball. In those games, Getz batted .255 with 18 RBI and 15 stolen bases. He fared somewhat better in 2011, appearing in 118 games and posting a .255 batting average, 26 RBI and 21 stolen bases. During the 2012 season, Getz made three separate trips to the disabled list, first in May with a bruised ribcage, then in June with a lateral strain of the left leg, and finally in August with a broken left thumb. The last injury required surgery, ending his season. Despite the injury history, the Royals signed Getz to a one-year contract on November 30, 2012. The base contract for 2013 was for $1.05 million, with additional performance bonuses totaling $150,000. Getz was optioned to the Triple-A Omaha Storm Chasers in June 2013 after starting the season batting .214 with a home run and 12 RBI. Jarrod Dyson was called down up to replace him. Getz was later recalled on July 18. The Royals did not tender him a contract for 2014 and he became a free agent on December 2, 2013.

=== Toronto Blue Jays ===
On January 16, 2014, Getz signed a minor-league contract with the Toronto Blue Jays. He was sent to minor league camp on March 24. Getz started the season with the Triple-A Buffalo Bisons. He was brought up to Toronto on April 29, and designated for assignment on May 11. Getz cleared waivers and was assigned to Triple-A Buffalo on May 13. On May 16, Getz announced his retirement from baseball. He had batted .160 in 10 games played for the Blue Jays.

== Executive career ==
In 2014, Getz was hired by the Kansas City Royals as their assistant to player development. He worked with them until 2016 when he went to the Chicago White Sox as their director of player development from 2017 to 2020. There, he worked with many talented prospects like Luis Robert Jr., Yoán Moncada, Eloy Jiménez, Michael Kopech, Lucas Giolito, and Dylan Cease. The White Sox farm system was ranked as the best in the MLB in 2017. In 2021, White Sox promoted him as assistant General Manager to then-GM Rick Hahn. Following Hahn's firing on August 22, 2023, Getz was promoted as the White Sox new Senior Vice President and GM on August 31.

== Personal life ==
His wife, Nicole "Nicky" Getz, was a contestant on The Amazing Race 23, where she was teamed up with David DeJesus's wife, Kim.
