= Sergio Santos (baseball) =

American baseball player (born 1983)

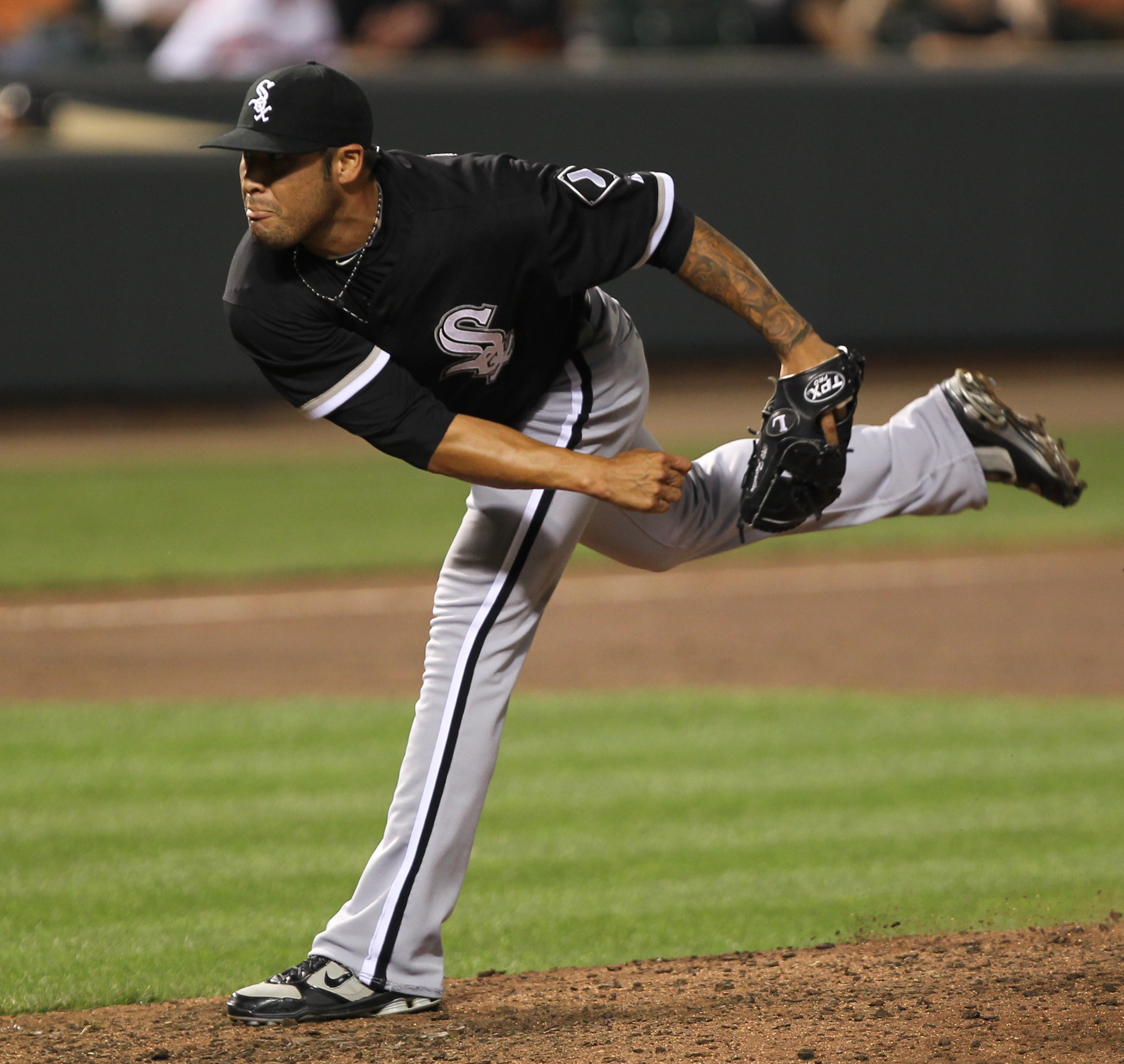
- Santos with the Chicago White Sox
- Pitcher
- Born: July 4, 1983 (age 43); Bellflower, California, U.S.
- Batted: Right Threw: Right

MLB debut
- April 8, 2010, for the Chicago White Sox

Last MLB appearance
- June 15, 2015, for the New York Yankees

MLB statistics
- Win–loss record: 7–12
- Earned run average: 3.98
- Strikeouts: 227
- Saves: 39
- Stats at Baseball Reference

Teams
- Chicago White Sox (2010–2011); Toronto Blue Jays (2012–2014); Los Angeles Dodgers (2015); New York Yankees (2015)

Sergio Jose Santos (born July 4, 1983) is an American former professional baseball pitcher. He played in Major League Baseball (MLB) for the Chicago White Sox, Toronto Blue Jays, Los Angeles Dodgers, and New York Yankees.

== Draft and career as a shortstop ==
Santos, who is of Mexican American descent, was drafted out of Mater Dei High School in Santa Ana, California by the Arizona Diamondbacks in the first round of the 2002 Major League Baseball draft. Between 2002 and 2005, Santos steadily worked his way up through the Diamondbacks' farm system all the way to Triple-A Tucson, where he hit 21 doubles and 12 home runs in 2005.

On December 27, 2005, Santos was sent to Toronto Blue Jays along with Troy Glaus in exchange for Miguel Batista and Orlando Hudson. In 2006, he hit .214 with 5 home runs and 38 RBI in 128 games with Toronto's Triple-A affiliate, the Syracuse Chiefs. He attended the Blue Jays' 2007 spring training, but did not make the active 25-man roster. After his struggles at Triple-A Syracuse in 2006, Toronto assigned Santos to their Double-A affiliate, the New Hampshire Fisher Cats for the 2007 season. Santos won the Home Run Derby preceding the Eastern League All Star game in 2007 at Dodd Stadium.

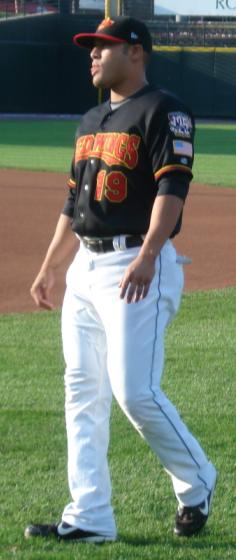
Santos with the Rochester Red Wings in 2008

On May 13, 2008, Santos was claimed off waivers by the Minnesota Twins. He became a free agent at the end of the season and signed a minor league contract with the Chicago White Sox, but on March 20, 2009, was traded to the San Francisco Giants in exchange for future considerations. Less than two weeks after the trade he was brought back to the White Sox organization and sent to extended spring training to convert from infielder to pitcher.

== Pitching career ==
=== Chicago White Sox ===
Santos pitched at four levels of the Sox minor league system in 2009, beginning at the Single-A Kannapolis Intimidators and ending at Triple-A Charlotte Knights. He posted a combined ERA of 8.16, but struck out more than a batter an inning.

On March 30, 2010, Santos was named to the White Sox opening day active roster. He won the 7th and final spot in the bullpen over Greg Aquino.

Santos earned his first major league win by pitching two innings of shutout baseball, striking out two in an 11 inning win over the Detroit Tigers on August 5, 2010.

He established a new Major League record with his 25th straight scoreless appearance on the road to start a season in a 6–3 win over the Baltimore Orioles at Camden Yards on August 11, 2011. Mariano Rivera had previously held the record since 2005. Santos' achievement was actually part of a longer such streak of 30 which began in the previous campaign.

=== Toronto Blue Jays ===
On December 6, 2011, he was traded to the Toronto Blue Jays for Néstor Molina. Santos was expected to act as the closer for the Jays, while veteran Francisco Cordero would be the setup pitcher.

Santos made his first appearance as a Blue Jay on Opening Day 2012, getting the final 2 outs in a 16 inning win against the Cleveland Indians, the longest game in Opening Day history. Santos was placed on the 15-day disabled list on April 21 due to right shoulder inflammation. He was later transferred to the 60-day disabled list. On July 15, it was announced that Santos would need season-ending surgery on his right shoulder. He made 6 appearances for the Blue Jays in 2012, posting a 0-1 record with a 9.00 ERA and 2 saves in 4 chances.

Santos pitched through 2013 Spring Training with the Blue Jays and made the team, but was not selected to be the closer, with manager John Gibbons electing to use Casey Janssen instead of Santos. On April 15, Santos was placed on the 15-day DL with a triceps strain. On May 14, it was revealed Santos would require surgery on his right elbow to clean out some bone spurs and chips. On August 1, Santos was activated from the 60-day disabled list by the Blue Jays and called up to replace Dustin McGowan, who was placed on the 15-day disabled list. Despite being sidelined for three and a half months, Santos pitched exceedingly well in his return to Blue Jays, and finished the season with a 1.75 ERA in 29 appearances.

Santos began the 2014 season as the closer for the Blue Jays, due to an injury to Casey Janssen. Santos converted his first 5 save chances, but proceeded to blow his next 3 opportunities, raising his ERA to over 10. On May 3, he was replaced as closer by Aaron Loup. Santos was designated for assignment by the Blue Jays on July 21. He cleared waivers and was assigned to the Triple-A Buffalo Bisons on July 23. His contract was selected from Buffalo on August 23. The Blue Jays designated Santos for assignment again on August 27, after he made two unsuccessful appearances with the big league club. On September 1, he was outrighted to the Double-A New Hampshire Fisher Cats. Santos finished the 2014 season with a 0–3 record, 5 saves, 8.57 ERA, 29 strikeouts, and a 2.19 WHIP in 26 appearances totaling 21 innings pitched. He became a free agent following the season.

=== Los Angeles Dodgers ===
On January 8, 2015, he agreed to a minor league contract with the Los Angeles Dodgers. He was assigned to the Triple-A Oklahoma City Dodgers. The Dodgers promoted him to the MLB roster on April 24. He was designated for assignment on May 27 and removed from the 40-man roster. In 12 games with the Dodgers, he had a 4.73 ERA. He cleared waivers and elected to become a free agent rather than return to the minors.

=== New York Yankees ===
On June 9, 2015, Santos agreed on a minor league deal with the New York Yankees. The Yankees promoted him to the major leagues on June 13. He was placed on the disabled list on June 19 with right elbow inflammation, after just two appearances with the Yankees. On June 21, it was reported that he would undergo Tommy John surgery. On November 2, he was outrighted off the 40–man roster and immediately elected free agency.

== Post–playing career ==
=== New York Yankees ===
Santos was named manager of the Hudson Valley Renegades, the High-A affiliate of the New York Yankees, for 2023.

=== Chicago White Sox ===
On January 19, 2024, the Chicago White Sox hired Santos to serve as the manager for their Double–A affiliate, the Birmingham Barons. On January 11, 2025, the White Sox promoted Santos to serve as the manager for their Triple-A affiliate, the Charlotte Knights. The White Sox parted ways with Santos following the 2025 season.

== Pitching style ==
Santos featured a hard four-seam fastball with movement in the 96-97 mph range, as well as an 87 mph slider and a changeup.
