= 2012 Los Angeles Angels season =

Major League Baseball season

2012 Los Angeles Angels
- League: American League
- Division: West
- Ballpark: Angel Stadium
- City: Anaheim, California
- Record: 89–73 (.549)
- Divisional place: 3rd
- Owner: Arte Moreno
- General manager: Jerry Dipoto
- Manager: Mike Scioscia
- Television: FSN West; KCOP (My 13) (Victor Rojas, Mark Gubicza)
- Radio: KLAA (AM 830) KSPN (AM 710) (Terry Smith, José Mota) Spanish: KWKW (AM 1330)
- Stats: ESPN.com; Baseball Reference

The 2012 Los Angeles Angels season was the franchise's 52nd season and 47th in Anaheim (all of them at Angel Stadium). The Angels would miss the playoffs for the third straight season, finishing third in the American League West at 89–73.

== 2011–12 offseason ==
=== Front office and business ===
The day after the end of the 2011 regular season, the Angels vowed to be "creative" and "aggressive" in their approach to the upcoming offseason because of the team missing out on the postseason two years in a row for the first time since 2000–01. Just a day after that statement, the Angels announced that general manager Tony Reagins had resigned with owner Arte Moreno saying that "we felt a change was needed", Reagins will remain part of the front office in a different capacity. On October 27, 2011, it was reported that the Angels will hire Jerry Dipoto to serve as the franchise's eleventh general manager, there will be an official announcement by the Angels on October 28. The Angels also signed a major new television deal with Fox Sports worth $3 billion over a span of 20 years which works out to $150 million a year. It is the new TV deal, that many speculate, enabled the Angels to spend so much in the 2011–12 offseason.

=== Albert Pujols and C. J. Wilson ===
On December 8, 2011, the Angels shocked the baseball world by signing former St. Louis Cardinals star Albert Pujols and Texas Rangers ace C. J. Wilson spending up to $331 million on the two players. According to analysts, Pujols was regarded as the best offensive player (along with arguably being the best player of this generation) and Wilson being the best pitcher on the market. Pujols had been a mainstay in the St. Louis Cardinals organization for 11 years prior to the signing and the Angels reportedly came into the negotiations at the last minute to sign the prized free agent. All media speculation prior to Dec 8 surrounding Pujols was centered around the Cardinals and Miami Marlins, while not as much as the Marlins, the Angels reported offer of $254 million over 10 years was much more than the reported offer by the Cardinals and had a full no-trade clause. As for C. J. Wilson, analysts predicted that the Angels would go after him, and while the Marlins offered him more money and a longer contract term, the Orange County native opted to return home and play for the Angels for a reported $77.5 million over 5 years. The two prize signings were introduced to the Southern California media and fans on December 10 in front of the two large hats at Angel Stadium. Because the press conference was outdoors and in front of the stadium, fans were encouraged to attend and anywhere between 3,000 and 5,000 fans attended to get a glimpse of the two new Angels. Also, within just a few days of the signings, the Angels reportedly sold over 1,000 new season ticket packages, 500 online subscriptions, and a large spike in merchandise sales at the Angels team store in Anaheim.

=== Other transactions ===
One of the first moves made by new general manager Jerry Dipoto was to acquire former Rockies catcher Chris Iannetta for pitcher Tyler Chatwood. They also sent former Angels catcher Jeff Mathis to Toronto in order to make room at the catching position for Iannetta. On December 7, the Angels signed veteran reliever LaTroy Hawkins, though was somewhat overshadowed by the Pujols and Wilson signings just a day later. Later, on December 12, the Angels announced that all eligible players will be tendered a contract, including Kendrys Morales, the slugger who has not played since his breaking his leg early in the 2010 season. The Angels also re-signed pitcher Jerome Williams to a one-year deal. The Angels gave 2B Howie Kendrick a 4-year $33 million deal They also released OF Chris Pettit and signed Francisco Rodriguez (Angels) to a $2 million deal.

== Spring training ==
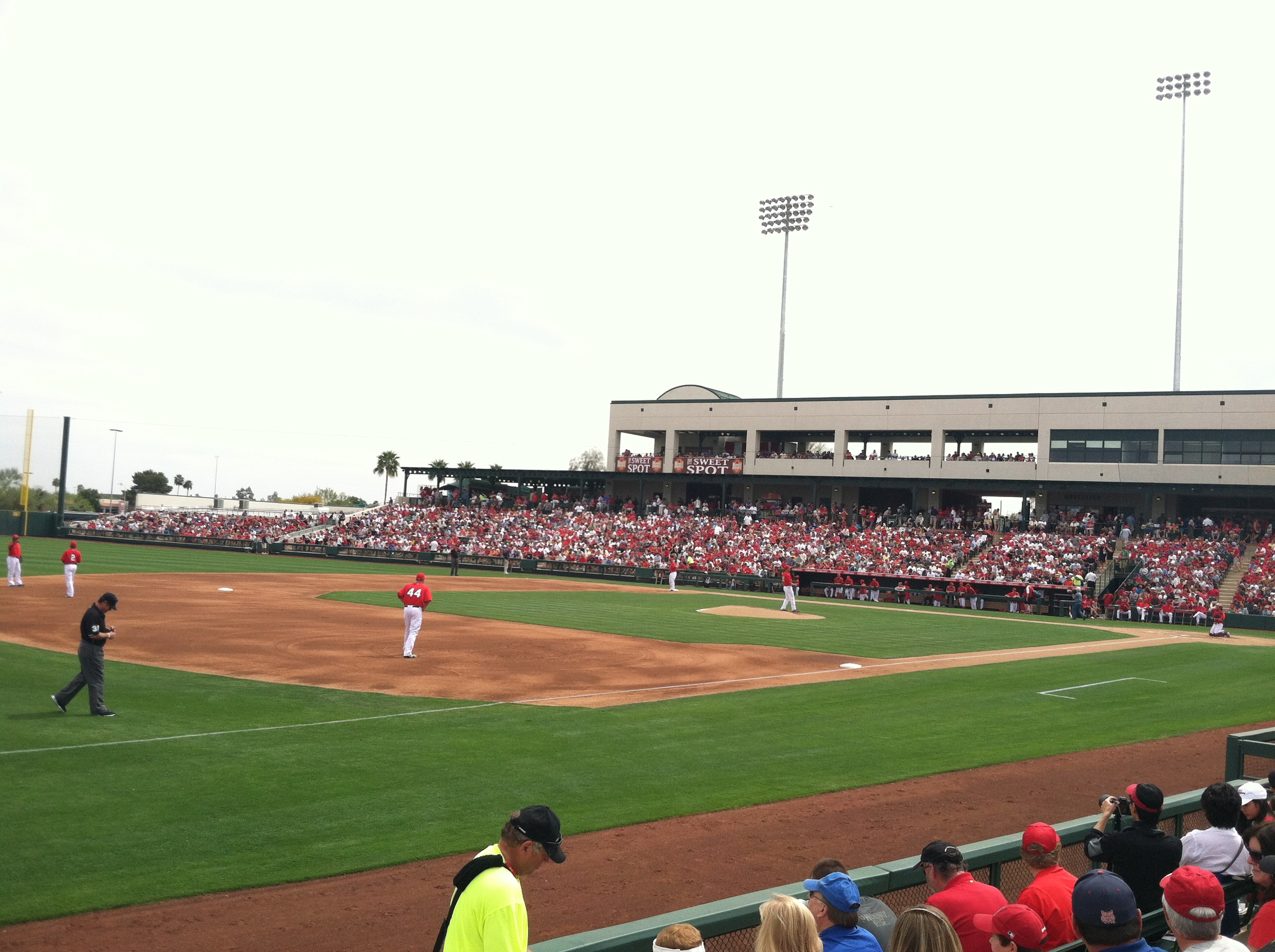
Tempe Diablo Stadium before a Spring training game

The Cactus League slate of games for the Angels began on Monday 1, March on the road against Oakland, a 9–1 Angels victory. Their first home game at Tempe Diablo Stadium was a 6–2 win on Tuesday, March 6 against the Chicago White Sox.

=== Spring training notes ===
The 2012 season marks the Angels 20th season at Tempe Diablo Stadium in Tempe, Arizona and the 7th season since the venue's massive renovations were completed in 2006.

The Angels came into the Spring with high expectations for the following 2012 campaign due to the large amount of money spent by owner Arte Moreno in the offseason signing slugger Albert Pujols and lefty C. J. Wilson. Both prized acquisitions played in the Angels first spring game against the Athletics and the two did not disappoint: Pujols went 2 for three with 1 run scored and 1 run batted in while Wilson threw 2 complete innings with no runs and giving up only one hit. Because of the high expectations for the Angels in 2012, the Angels are expecting larger than usual crowds in Tempe this spring. One of the biggest questions surrounding the Angels franchise going into the Spring training was whether or not Kendrys Morales would make a comeback from breaking his ankle in 2010. Morales played in his first baseball game in nearly two years on March 16, 2012 in a minor league game and played in his first major league game of any kind on March 22. In that game, Morales went two for three with a run scored and was described by Angels personnel and Morales as a large step forward for the slugger. On March 23, in a split squad game against the Cleveland Indians in Goodyear, Morales again went two for three with a run scored in only his second game of the spring, but this time with his first home run since the 2010 regular season. According to the Angels radio broadcaster Terry Smith, the Angels have already sold out six home games at Tempe Diablo Stadium. The first sell-out crowd of the spring was for an Angels loss to the San Diego Padres on March 9. The Angels finished their spring training slate of games on April 4, 2012 with a record of 19–12–2, good for 3rd place in the Cactus League in terms of win percentage and 2nd in terms of number of wins (19). The average attendance at Tempe Diablo Stadium was 8,675 (total of 130,126) which was an average of 90.76% capacity. The Angels also sold out 9 of their 15 home Cactus League games.

== Regular season ==
See the game log below for detailed game-by-game regular season information.

The season for the Angels began on Friday, April 6 at home against Kansas City. Their first road game was on Monday, April 9 at Minnesota. Their longest homestand was between July 20–29 (10 home games), and their longest road trip was May 18–27 and July 30 – August 8 (10 road games). Their final game of the regular season was on Wednesday, October 3 on the road against Seattle.

=== Notable dates ===
==== April ====
April 6–8: Opening series at home against the Kansas City Royals. Despite winning the opening game of the series and season, the Angels would go on to lose the series two games to one.

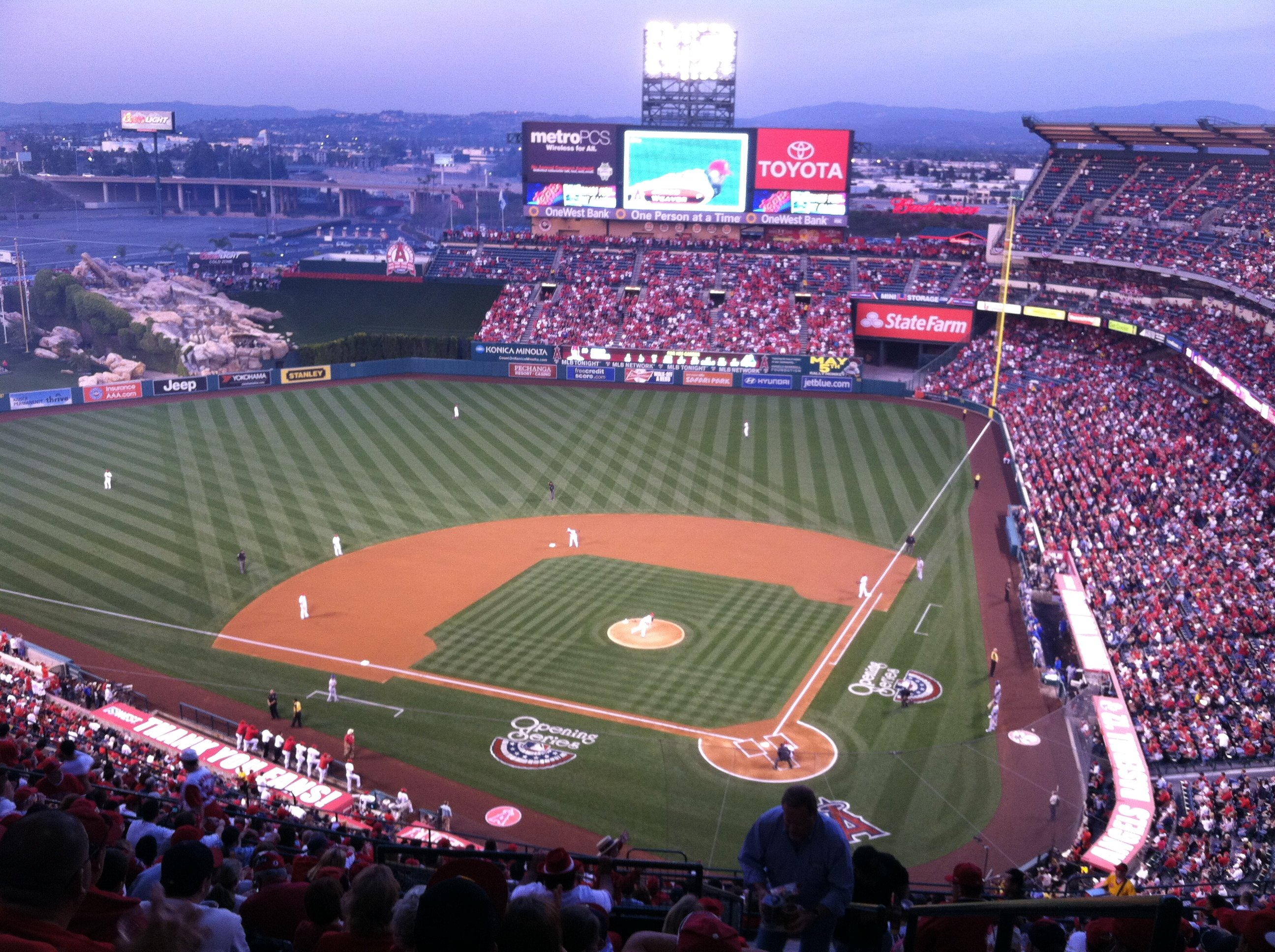
Angel Stadium on Opening Day

Opening Day lineup:

1. Erick Aybar (SS)
2. Howie Kendrick (2B)
3. Albert Pujols (1B)
4. Torii Hunter (RF)
5. Vernon Wells (LF)
6. Kendrys Morales (DH)
7. Mark Trumbo (3B)
8. Chris Iannetta (C)
9. Peter Bourjos (CF)
P. Jered Weaver (RHP)

April 16–19: First series against an AL West division opponent, the series will take place against the Oakland Athletics at Angel Stadium. The Athletics took the series, three games to one.
April 20–22: The Angels defeated the then-AL East leading Baltimore Orioles two games to one to capture their first series win of the 2012 campaign.

==== May ====
April 30 – May 2: The Angels win their second series of the 2012 campaign in a sweep over the visiting Minnesota Twins. In the final game of the series, Angels pitcher Jered Weaver threw the franchise's tenth no-hitter in a 9-0 shutout victory.
May 11–13: First series against the defending AL West and American League champion Texas Rangers, it will take place in Arlington, Texas. The Halos ended up falling to the defending AL champions, two games to one.
May 18: Interleague play will begin for the Angels against the San Diego Padres at Petco Park. While the Padres ended up winning the series two games to one, the Angels continued their recent success over the National League by finishing interleague play with a record of 12–6, which was good for the third best interleague record in the Major Leagues only behind the Rangers and Yankees.
May 22–29: The Angels went on an eight-game winning streak by teaching two of three from Oakland, sweeping Seattle in a four game set, and winning the first two games in a three game series against the visiting Yankees. During the eight game win streak, the Angels went above the .500 mark for the first time since opening day.

==== June ====
June 11–13: The Angels faced the cross-town rival Dodgers in Los Angeles. The Angels would go on to win the series two games to one. During the first game of the series, the crowd at Dodger Stadium cheered upon hearing that the Los Angeles Kings beat the New Jersey Devils 6–1 to win the Stanley Cup in Game 6 of the Finals.
June 18–20: The San Francisco Giants visited Angel Stadium for the first time since the 2002 World Series and the result was not much different: the Angels won the series two games to one.
June 22–24: The Freeway Series resumed in Anaheim. The Angels went on to win the series two games to one and the season series four games to two. The Angels also improved their all-time record against the Dodgers to 54–38, and Angels manager (and former Dodgers catcher) Mike Scioscia's record over his former team to 49–29.
June 26: The Angels took sole control of a playoff berth (the second wild card spot) for the first time in the 2012 campaign after defeating the Baltimore Orioles in a 7–3 decision.

==== July ====
July 8: The Angels end the "first half" of the season a season-high 10 games over the .500 mark after defeating the Baltimore Orioles 6–0. Los Angeles was also in control of the first wild card spot and extended their lead to 2½ games over the very same Orioles.
July 9: 2012 Major League Baseball Home Run Derby. Angels slugger Mark Trumbo participated in the derby at Kauffman Stadium in Kansas City, he ended up finishing third behind champion Prince Fielder and runner-up José Bautista.
July 10: 2012 Major League Baseball All-Star Game. The National League won their third All-Star game in a row and secured home field advantage for the National League champion in the World Series. Four Angels were featured at the mid-summer classic: Mike Trout, Mark Trumbo, Jered Weaver, and C. J. Wilson. Reliever Ernesto Frieri was up for the last spot on the American League roster in the final vote, but he ended up falling to Texas pitcher Yu Darvish. Three of the four Angels made it into the game with Weaver pitching a scoreless frame in the top of the fifth inning and Trout going 1-1 with a walk. Wilson was unable to pitch in the game due to injury.
July 20–22: After stumbling out of the All-Star break losing two series against New York and Detroit, the Angels came home and promptly took two of three from the division leading Texas Rangers. By virtue of the series win, Los Angeles was able to gain some ground on the Rangers and after the series they sat five games out of first in the American League West.
July 27: The Angels acquired Zack Greinke from the Milwaukee Brewers on July 27 for rookie infielder Jean Segura and minor league pitchers Ariel Peña and John Hellweg. Greinke made his Angel debut against the Tampa Bay Rays on July 29, and despite a good outing, he suffered the loss in a 2–0 Rays win.

==== September ====
September 28–30: Final home series of the regular season, the Angels will face the division rival Seattle Mariners.

==== October ====
October 1–3: Final series of the regular season.

== Schedule and results ==
=== Regular season ===
2012 Game Log
April: 8–15 (Home: 5–6; Road: 3–9)

#	Date	Opponent	Score	Win	Loss	Save	Attendance	Record	Stadium	Box	GB
1	April 6	Royals	5–0	Weaver (1–0)	Crow (0–1)		44,106	1–0	Angel Stadium	W1	0
2	April 7	Royals	6–3	Hochevar (1–0)	Haren (0–1)		40,022	1–1	Angel Stadium	L1	-1
3	April 8	Royals	7–3	Sánchez (1–0)	Santana (0–1)	Broxton (1)	32,227	1–2	Angel Stadium	L2	-1½
4	April 9	@ Twins	5–1	Wilson (1–0)	Blackburn (0–1)		39,414	2–2	Target Field	W1	-1
5	April 11	@ Twins	6–5	Gray (1–0)	Takahashi (0–1)	Capps (1)	31,413	2–3	Target Field	L1	-1½
6	April 12	@ Twins	10–9	Gray (2–0)	Thompson (0–1)	Capps (2)	31,782	2–4	Target Field	L2	-2½
7	April 13	@ Yankees	5–0	Kuroda (1–1)	Santana (0–2)		49,386	2–5	Yankee Stadium	L3	-3½
8	April 14	@ Yankees	7–1	Wilson (2–0)	Hughes (0–2)		46,829	3–5	Yankee Stadium	W1	-3½
9	April 15	@ Yankees	11–5	Nova (2–0)	Williams (0–1)		41,055	3–6	Yankee Stadium	L1	-4½
10	April 16	Athletics	6–0	Weaver (2–0)	McCarthy (0–2)		27,338	4–6	Angel Stadium	W1	-4½
11	April 17	Athletics	5–3	Fuentes (1–0)	Jepsen (0–1)	Balfour (3)	41,016	4–7	Angel Stadium	L1	-5
12	April 18	Athletics	6–0	Colón (3–1)	Santana (0–3)		27,217	4–8	Angel Stadium	L2	-6
13	April 19	Athletics	4–2	Milone (2–1)	Wilson (2–1)	Balfour (4)	27,864	4–9	Angel Stadium	L3	-7
14	April 20	Orioles	6–3	Williams (1–1)	Matusz (0–3)	Walden (1)	32,272	5–9	Angel Stadium	W1	-6½
15	April 21	Orioles	6–3	Weaver (3–0)	Arrieta (1–1)		38,054	6–9	Angel Stadium	W2	-6
16	April 22	Orioles	3–2 (10)	Strop (2–1)	Hawkins (0–1)	Johnson (7)	38,221	6–10	Angel Stadium	L1	-7
17	April 24	@ Rays	5–0	Price (3–1)	Santana (0–4)		14,933	6–11	Tropicana Field	L2	-7½
18	April 25	@ Rays	3–2	Hellickson (3–0)	Wilson (2–2)	Rodney (6)	14,638	6–12	Tropicana Field	L3	-8½
19	April 26	@ Rays	4–3	Gomes (1–1)	Walden (0–1)		15,417	6–13	Tropicana Field	L4	-9
20	April 27	@ Indians	3–2	Pestano (1–0)	Carpenter (0–1)		12,597	6–14	Progressive Field	L5	-9
21	April 28	@ Indians	2–1	Haren (1–1)	Gómez (1–1)	Downs (1)	11,316	7–14	Progressive Field	W1	-9
22	April 29	@ Indians	4–0	Lowe (4–1)	Santana (0–5)		15,421	7–15	Progressive Field	L1	-9
23	April 30	Twins	4–3	Wilson (3–2)	Blackburn (0–3)	Downs (2)	27,027	8–15	Angel Stadium	W1	-9

May: 18–11 (Home: 7–5; Road: 11–6)

#	Date	Opponent	Score	Win	Loss	Save	Attendance	Record	Stadium	Box	GB
24	May 1	Twins	4–0	Williams (2–1)	Liriano (0–4)		30,039	9–15	Angel Stadium	W2	-8
25	May 2	Twins	9–0	Weaver (4–0)*	Hendriks (0–2)		27,288	10–15	Angel Stadium	W3	-7
26	May 3	Blue Jays	5–0	Morrow (3–1)	Haren (1–2)		28,359	10–16	Angel Stadium	L1	-7½
27	May 4	Blue Jays	4–0	Álvarez (2–2)	Santana (0–6)		33,160	10–17	Angel Stadium	L2	-7½
28	May 5	Blue Jays	6–2	Wilson (4–2)	Drabek (2–3)		39,018	11–17	Angel Stadium	W1	-7½
29	May 6	Blue Jays	4–3	Williams (3–1)	Hutchison (1–1)	Hawkins (1)	37,548	12–17	Angel Stadium	W2	-6½
30	May 7	@ Twins	8–3	Weaver (5–0)	Liriano (0–5)		31,382	13–17	Target Field	W3	-6½
31	May 8	@ Twins	5–0	Diamond (1–0)	Haren (1–3)		30,776	13–18	Target Field	L1	-7½
32	May 9	@ Twins	6–2	Santana (1–6)	Pavano (2–3)		31,915	14–18	Target Field	W1	-7
33	May 11	@ Rangers	10–3	Darvish (5–1)	Wilson (4–3)		48,201	14–19	Rangers Ballpark in Arlington	L1	-8
34	May 12	@ Rangers	4–2	Carpenter (1–1)	Harrison (4–3)	Downs (3)	47,699	15–19	Rangers Ballpark in Arlington	W1	-7
35	May 13	@ Rangers	13–6	Feliz (3–1)	Weaver (5–1)		46,669	15–20	Rangers Ballpark in Arlington	L1	-8
36	May 14	Athletics	5–0	Ross (2–3)	Haren (1–4)		32,851	15–21	Angel Stadium	L2	-8
37	May 15	Athletics	4–0	Santana (2–6)	Colón (3–4)		31,762	16–21	Angel Stadium	W1	-7
38	May 16	White Sox	7–2	Williams (4–1)	Floyd (3–4)		39,027	17–21	Angel Stadium	W2	-7
39	May 17	White Sox	6–1	Sale (4–2)	Wilson (4–4)		30,786	17–22	Angel Stadium	L1	-7
40	May 18	@ Padres	7–2	Weaver (6–1)	Suppan (2–2)		31,389	18–22	Petco Park	W1	-7
41	May 19	@ Padres	3–2	Gregerson (1–0)	Haren (1–5)	Thayer (5)	43,427	18–23	Petco Park	L1	-7
42	May 20	@ Padres	3–2 (13)	Mikolas (1–1)	Pauley (0–1)		33,975	18–24	Petco Park	L2	-8
43	May 21	@ Athletics	2–1	Milone (6–3)	Williams (4–2)	Fuentes (4)	11,292	18–25	O.co Coliseum	L3	-8
44	May 22	@ Athletics	5–0	Wilson (5–4)	Godfrey (0–4)		12,894	19–25	O.co Coliseum	W1	-8
45	May 23	@ Athletics	3–1 (11)	Walden (1–1)	Norberto (0–1)	Frieri (1)	23,617	20–25	O.co Coliseum	W2	-7
46	May 24	@ Mariners	3–0	Haren (2–5)	Vargas (5–4)		18,048	21–25	Safeco Field	W3	-6½
47	May 25	@ Mariners	6–4	Isringhausen (1–0)	League (0–4)	Downs (4)	23,517	22–25	Safeco Field	W4	-6½
48	May 26	@ Mariners	5–3	Williams (5–2)	Hernández (4–4)	Frieri (2)	29,483	23–25	Safeco Field	W5	-6½
49	May 27	@ Mariners	4–2	Wilson (6–4)	Noesí (2–6)	Downs (5)	24,467	24–25	Safeco Field	W6	-6½
50	May 28	Yankees	9–8	Walden (2–1)	Wade (0–1)		44,016	25–25	Angel Stadium	W7	-6½
51	May 29	Yankees	5–1	Haren (3–5)	Pettitte (2–2)		42,065	26–25	Angel Stadium	W8	-5½
52	May 30	Yankees	6–5	Nova (6–2)	Takahashi (0–2)	Soriano (6)	40,111	26–26	Angel Stadium	L1	-5½
*Jered Weaver threw the tenth no-hitter in Angels history.

June: 17–9 (Home: 9–6; Road: 8–3)

#	Date	Opponent	Score	Win	Loss	Save	Attendance	Record	Stadium	Box	GB
53	June 1	Rangers	4–2	Williams (6–2)	Lewis (4–4)	Frieri (3)	40,080	27–26	Angel Stadium	W1	-4½
54	June 2	Rangers	3–2	Cassevah (1–0)	Darvish (7–3)	Frieri (4)	44,227	28–26	Angel Stadium	W2	-3½
55	June 3	Rangers	7–3	Harrison (7–3)	Haren (3–6)		42,465	28–27	Angel Stadium	L1	-4½
56	June 4	Mariners	8–6	Vargas (7–4)	Santana (2–7)	Wilhelmsen (1)	36,079	28–28	Angel Stadium	L2	-4½
57	June 5	Mariners	6–1	Richards (1–0)	Beavan (3–5)		35,021	29–28	Angel Stadium	W1	-4½
58	June 6	Mariners	8–6	Kelley (1–2)	Williams (6–3)	Wilhelmsen (2)	37,342	29–29	Angel Stadium	L1	-4
59	June 8	@ Rockies	7–2	Wilson (7–4)	White (2–4)		41,814	30–29	Coors Field	W1	-4
60	June 9	@ Rockies	11–5	Haren (4–6)	Francis (0–1)		37,801	31–29	Coors Field	W2	-3
61	June 10	@ Rockies	10–8	Santana (3–7)	Friedrich (4–2)	Downs (6)	37,722	32–29	Coors Field	W3	-3
62	June 11*	@ Dodgers	3–2	Isringhausen (2–0)	Jansen (4–1)	Frieri (5)	50,559	33–29	Dodger Stadium	W4	-2½
63	June 12*	@ Dodgers	5–2	Wright (3–2)	Williams (6–4)	Jansen (10)	55,279	33–30	Dodger Stadium	L1	-3½
64	June 13*	@ Dodgers	2–1	Hawkins (1–1)	Jansen (4–2)	Frieri (6)	43,494	34–30	Dodger Stadium	W1	-3½
65	June 15	Diamondbacks	5–0	Cahill (5–5)	Haren (4–7)		37,096	34–31	Angel Stadium	L1	-4
66	June 16	Diamondbacks	2–0	Santana (4–7)	Saunders (4–5)		42,483	35–31	Angel Stadium	W1	-4
67	June 17	Diamondbacks	2–0	Richards (2–0)	Kennedy (5–7)	Frieri (7)	42,222	36–31	Angel Stadium	W2	-4
68	June 18	Giants	5–3	Cain (9–2)	Williams (6–5)	Casilla (19)	41,234	36–32	Angel Stadium	L1	-5
69	June 19	Giants	12–5	Wilson (8–4)	Zito (5–5)		38,010	37–32	Angel Stadium	W1	-5
70	June 20	Giants	6–0	Weaver (7–1)	Vogelsong (6–3)		40,321	38–32	Angel Stadium	W2	-5
71	June 22*	Dodgers	8–5	Haren (5–7)	Billingsley (4–6)	Frieri (8)	44,548	39–32	Angel Stadium	W3	-5
72	June 23*	Dodgers	3–1	Capuano (9–2)	Santana (4–8)	Jansen (12)	44,512	39–33	Angel Stadium	L1	-5
73	June 24*	Dodgers	5–3	Downs (1–0)	Lindblom (2–2)	Frieri (9)	43,975	40–33	Angel Stadium	W1	-5
74	June 26	@ Orioles	7–3	Wilson (9–4)	Matusz (5–9)		24,296	41–33	Oriole Park at Camden Yards	W2	-4½
75	June 27	@ Orioles	13–1	Weaver (8–1)	Hammel (8–3)		18,055	42–33	Oriole Park at Camden Yards	W3	-4½
76	June 28	@ Blue Jays	9–7	Haren (6–7)	Cecil (1–1)	Frieri (10)	24,668	43–33	Rogers Centre	W4	-4½
77	June 29	@ Blue Jays	7–5	Cordero (3–4)	Walden (2–2)	Janssen (9)	24,538	43–34	Rogers Centre	L1	-5½
78	June 30	@ Blue Jays	11–2	Álvarez (5–6)	Richards (2–1)		29,287	43–35	Rogers Centre	L2	-6½
*Freeway Series, Angels win 4–2.

July: 14–12 (Home: 8–5; Road: 6–7)

#	Date	Opponent	Score	Win	Loss	Save	Attendance	Record	Stadium	Box	GB
79	July 1	@ Blue Jays	10–6	Isringhausen (3–0)	Cordero (3–5)		34,853	44–35	Rogers Centre	W1	-5½
80	July 2	@ Indians	3–0	Weaver (9–1)	Jiménez (7–7)	Downs (7)	21,616	45–35	Progressive Field	W2	-5
81	July 3	@ Indians	9–5	McAllister (3–1)	Haren (6–8)		29,292	45–36	Progressive Field	L1	-5
82	July 4	@ Indians	12–3	Lowe (8–6)	Santana (4–9)		20,979	45–37	Progressive Field	L2	-5
83	July 5	Orioles	9–7	Hawkins (2–1)	Ayala (2–2)	Frieri (11)	38,104	46–37	Angel Stadium	W1	-4
84	July 6	Orioles	3–2	González (1–0)	Wilson (9–5)	Johnson (26)	42,716	46–38	Angel Stadium	L1	-4
85	July 7	Orioles	3–0	Weaver (10–1)	Hammel (8–5)	Downs (8)	41,147	47–38	Angel Stadium	W1	-4
86	July 8	Orioles	6–0	Mills (1–0)	Chen (7–5)		37,108	48–38	Angel Stadium	W2	-4
July 10: All-Star Game (NL wins—Box)			8–0	Cain (SF)	Verlander (DET)		40,933		Kauffman Stadium	Kansas City	
87	July 13	@ Yankees	6–5	Qualls (2–1)	Downs (1–1)	Soriano (21)	47,873	48–39	Yankee Stadium	L1	-5
88	July 14	@ Yankees	5–3	García (4–2)	Williams (6–6)	Soriano (22)	47,789	48–40	Yankee Stadium	L2	-5
89	July 15	@ Yankees	10–8	Weaver (11–1)	Nova (10–4)	Jepsen (1)	46,679	49–40	Yankee Stadium	W1	-5
90	July 16	@ Tigers	8–6	Dotel (3–2)	Hawkins (2–2)	Valverde (17)	36,806	49–41	Comerica Park	L1	-5½
91	July 17	@ Tigers	13–0	Richards (3–1)	Turner (0–1)		33,950	50–41	Comerica Park	W1	-5½
92	July 18	@ Tigers	7–2	Fister (4–6)	Wilson (9–6)		37,915	50–42	Comerica Park	L1	-5½
93	July 19	@ Tigers	5–1	Scherzer (9–5)	Williams (6–7)		40,311	50–43	Comerica Park	L2	-6
94	July 20	Rangers	6–1	Weaver (12–1)	Holland (6–5)		43,936	51–43	Angel Stadium	W1	-5
95	July 21	Rangers	9–2	Darvish (11–6)	Santana (4–10)		39,086	51–44	Angel Stadium	L1	-6
96	July 22	Rangers	7–4	Haren (7–8)	Harrison (12–5)		42,160	52–44	Angel Stadium	W1	-5
97	July 23	Royals	6–3	Jepsen (1–1)	Holland (4–3)	Downs (9)	35,047	53–44	Angel Stadium	W2	-5
98	July 24	Royals	4–1	Smith (2–3)	Richards (3–2)	Broxton (23)	35,051	53–45	Angel Stadium	L1	-5
99	July 25	Royals	11–6	Weaver (13–1)	Hochevar (6–9)		39,107	54–45	Angel Stadium	W1	-5
100	July 27	Rays	3–1	Haren (8–8)	Cobb (4–8)	Frieri (12)	40,136	55–45	Angel Stadium	W2	-4
101	July 28	Rays	3–0	Moore (7–7)	Wilson (9–7)	Rodney (29)	41,232	55–46	Angel Stadium	L1	-4
102	July 29	Rays	2–0	Hellickson (6–6)	Greinke (9–4)	Rodney (30)	35,477	55–47	Angel Stadium	L2	-5
103	July 30	@ Rangers	15–8	Santana (5–10)	Oswalt (3–2)	Williams (1)	36,111	56–47	Rangers Ballpark in Arlington	W1	-4
104	July 31	@ Rangers	6–2	Weaver (14–1)	Holland (7–6)		34,918	57–47	Rangers Ballpark in Arlington	W2	-3

August 13–15 (Home: 6–7; Road: 7–8)

#	Date	Opponent	Score	Win	Loss	Save	Attendance	Record	Stadium	Box	GB
105	August 1	@ Rangers	11–10 (10)	Nathan (2–3)	Isringhausen (3–1)		42,832	57–48	Rangers Ballpark in Arlington	L1	-4
106	August 2	@ Rangers	15–9	Oswalt (4–2)	Carpenter (1–2)		40,281	57–49	Rangers Ballpark in Arlington	L2	-5
107	August 3	@ White Sox	8–6 (10)	Thornton (4–6)	Takahashi (0–3)		32,060	57–50	U.S. Cellular Field	L3	-6
108	August 4	@ White Sox	6–5 (10)	Jepsen (2–1)	Thornton (4–7)	Frieri (13)	28,571	58–50	U.S. Cellular Field	W1	-6
109	August 5	@ White Sox	4–2	Jones (5–0)	Isringhausen (3–2)	Reed (19)	30,202	58–51	U.S. Cellular Field	L1	-6
110	August 6	@ Athletics	4–0	Weaver (15–1)	Parker (7–6)		13,341	59–51	O.co Coliseum	W1	-5
111	August 7	@ Athletics	10–4	Colón (9–8)	Wilson (9–8)		15,458	59–52	O.co Coliseum	L1	-6
112	August 8	@ Athletics	9–8	Neshek (1–0)	Hawkins (2–3)	Cook (12)	21,150	59–53	O.co Coliseum	L2	-7
113	August 10	Mariners	6–5	Frieri (2–0)	Kinney (0–2)		39,016	60–53	Angel Stadium	W1	-6
114	August 11	Mariners	7–4	Iwakuma (3–3)	Haren (8–9)		38,722	60–54	Angel Stadium	L1	-7
115	August 12	Mariners	4–1	Vargas (13–8)	Weaver (15–2)	Wilhelmsen (16)	36,505	60–55	Angel Stadium	L2	-8
116	August 13	Indians	6–2	Masterson (9–10)	Wilson (9–9)	Perez (32)	36,620	60–56	Angel Stadium	L3	-8
117	August 14	Indians	9–6	Greinke (10–4)	Jiménez (9–12)	Frieri (14)	39,827	61–56	Angel Stadium	W1	-7
118	August 15	Indians	8–4	Santana (6–10)	Hernández (0–1)		37,554	62–56	Angel Stadium	W2	-6
119	August 16	Rays	7–0	Price (16–4)	Haren (8–10)		38,591	62–57	Angel Stadium	L1	-7
120	August 17	Rays	12–3	Shields (11–7)	Weaver (15–3)		37,298	62–58	Angel Stadium	L2	-7
121	August 18	Rays	10–8	McGee (4–2)	Jepsen (2–2)	Rodney (38)	41,086	62–59	Angel Stadium	L3	-8
122	August 19	Rays	8–3	Moore (10–7)	Greinke (10–5)		36,789	62–60	Angel Stadium	L4	-9
123	August 21	@ Red Sox	5–3	Santana (7–10)	Cook (3–7)	Frieri (15)	37,794	63–60	Fenway Park	W1	-8½
124	August 22	@ Red Sox	7–3	Weaver (16–3)	Buchholz (11–4)		37,373	64–60	Fenway Park	W2	-8½
125	August 23	@ Red Sox	14–13 (10)	Frieri (3–0)	Aceves (2–8)		37,829	65–60	Fenway Park	W3	-8½
126	August 24	@ Tigers	2–1	Greinke (11–5)	Porcello (9–9)	Richards (1)	39,356	66–60	Comerica Park	W4	-8½
127	August 25	@ Tigers	5–3	Dotel (4–2)	Richards (3–3)	Valverde (26)	41,970	66–61	Comerica Park	L1	-9½
128	August 26	@ Tigers	5–2	Scherzer (14–6)	Santana (7–11)		40,074	66–62	Comerica Park	L2	-9½
129	August 28	Red Sox	6–5	Jepsen (3–2)	Aceves (2–9)		38,745	67–62	Angel Stadium	W1	-10
130	August 29	Red Sox	10–3	Wilson (10–9)	Stewart (1–3)		37,841	68–62	Angel Stadium	W2	-9
131	August 30	Red Sox	5–2	Greinke (12–5)	Lester (8–11)	Frieri (16)	39,013	69–62	Angel Stadium	W3	-8½
132	August 31	@ Mariners	9–1	Haren (9–10)	Millwood (4–12)		17,739	70–62	Safeco Field	W4	-8½

September/October 19–11 (Home: 10–6; Road: 9–5)

#	Date	Opponent	Score	Win	Loss	Save	Attendance	Record	Stadium	Box	GB
133	September 1	@ Mariners	5–2	Santana (8–11)	Hernández (13–6)	Frieri (17)	22,910	71–62	Safeco Field	W5	-7½
134	September 2	@ Mariners	2–1	Iwakuma (6–3)	Weaver (16–4)	Wilhelmsen (22)	20,584	71–63	Safeco Field	L1	-8½
135	September 3	@ Athletics	8–3	Wilson (11–9)	Milone (11–10)		20,180	72–63	O.co Coliseum	W1	-8½
136	September 4	@ Athletics	6–1	Greinke (13–5)	Parker (9–8)		11,688	73–63	O.co Coliseum	W2	-7½
137	September 5	@ Athletics	7–1	Haren (10–10)	McCarthy (8–6)		15,404	74–63	O.co Coliseum	W3	-7½
138	September 7	Tigers	3–2	Frieri (4–0)	Dotel (5–3)		40,104	75–63	Angel Stadium	W4	-7
139	September 8	Tigers	6–1	Wilson (12–9)	Verlander (13–8)		41,154	76–63	Angel Stadium	W5	-7
140	September 9	Tigers	3–2	Greinke (14–5)	Sánchez (7–12)	Frieri (18)	38,216	77–63	Angel Stadium	W6	-6
141	September 10	Athletics	3–1	Parker (10–8)	Haren (10–11)	Balfour (17)	36,064	77–64	Angel Stadium	L1	-6½
142	September 11	Athletics	6–5	Straily (2–0)	Williams (6–8)	Blevins (1)	37,794	77–65	Angel Stadium	L2	-7½
143	September 12	Athletics	4–1	Griffin (6–0)	Santana (8–12)	Cook (14)	38,097	77–66	Angel Stadium	L3	-8½
144	September 13	Athletics	6–0	Weaver (17–4)	Anderson (4–1)		38,029	78–66	Angel Stadium	W1	-7½
145	September 14	@ Royals	9–7	Walden (3–2)	Collins (5–3)	Frieri (19)	27,586	79–66	Kauffman Stadium	W2	-7½
146	September 15	@ Royals	3–2	Herrera (4–2)	Frieri (4–1)		23,027	79–67	Kauffman Stadium	L1	-7½
147	September 16	@ Royals	4–3	Haren (11–11)	Smith (5–8)	Jepsen (2)	24,979	80–67	Kauffman Stadium	W1	-7½
148	September 18	Rangers	11–3	Weaver (18–4)	Dempster (11–7)		36,948	81–67	Angel Stadium	W2	-6½
149	September 19	Rangers	6–2	Holland (11–6)	Wilson (12–10)		37,093	81–68	Angel Stadium	L1	-7½
150	September 20	Rangers	3–1	Darvish (16–9)	Frieri (4–2)	Nathan (34)	38,205	81–69	Angel Stadium	L2	-8½
151	September 21	White Sox	6–2	Santana (9–12)	Peavy (11–12)		39,326	82–69	Angel Stadium	W1	-7½
152	September 22	White Sox	4–2	Haren (12–11)	Quintana (6–5)	Frieri (20)	41,440	83–69	Angel Stadium	W2	-6½
153	September 23	White Sox	4–1	Weaver (19–4)	Floyd (10–11)		36,546	84–69	Angel Stadium	W3	-6½
154	September 25	Mariners	5–4	Greinke (15–5)	Ramírez (1–3)	Frieri (21)	38,538	85–69	Angel Stadium	W4	-6
155	September 26	Mariners	4–3	Frieri (5–2)	Pryor (3–1)		37,916	86–69	Angel Stadium	W5	-5
156	September 27	Mariners	9–4	Iwakuma (8–5)	Haren (12–12)		37,377	86–70	Angel Stadium	L1	-6
157	September 28	@ Rangers	7–4	Weaver (20–4)	Dempster (12–8)	Frieri (22)	46,662	87–70	Rangers Ballpark in Arlington	W1	-5
158	September 30	@ Rangers	5–4	Richards (4–3)	Nathan (3–5)	Frieri (23)	46,713	88–70	Rangers Ballpark in Arlington	W2	-4
159	September 30	@ Rangers	8–7	Holland (12–6)	Santana (9–13)	Nathan (37)	48,089	88–71	Rangers Ballpark in Arlington	L1	-5
160	October 1	@ Mariners	8–4	Wilson (13–10)	Hernández (13–9)		13,963	89–71	Safeco Field	W1	-4
161	October 2	@ Mariners	6–1	Iwakuma (9–5)	Haren (12–13)		14,353	89–72	Safeco Field	L1	-4
162	October 3	@ Mariners	12–0	Beavan (11–11)	Weaver (20–5)		15,614	89–73	Safeco Field	L2	-5

Final games legend
Angels Win	Angels Loss	All-Star Game	Game postponed

Future Games Legend
Home Game	Away Game

"GB" Legend
1st (AL West)	Not in Playoff Position	In Playoff Position	Tied for Playoff Position

Regular Season Schedule (calendar style)
Regular Season Schedule (sortable text)

== Standings ==
=== Season standings ===
==== American League West ====
AL West
Team	W	L	Pct.	GB	Home	Road
Oakland Athletics	94	68	.580	—	50‍–‍31	44‍–‍37
Texas Rangers	93	69	.574	1	50‍–‍31	43‍–‍38
Los Angeles Angels	89	73	.549	5	46‍–‍35	43‍–‍38
Seattle Mariners	75	87	.463	19	40‍–‍41	35‍–‍46

==== American League Wild Card ====
Division winners
Team	W	L	Pct.
New York Yankees	95	67	.586
Oakland Athletics	94	68	.580
Detroit Tigers	88	74	.543

Wild Card teams (Top 2 teams qualify for postseason)
Team	W	L	Pct.	GB
Texas Rangers	93	69	.574	—
Baltimore Orioles	93	69	.574	—
Tampa Bay Rays	90	72	.556	3
Los Angeles Angels	89	73	.549	4
Chicago White Sox	85	77	.525	8
Seattle Mariners	75	87	.463	18
Toronto Blue Jays	73	89	.451	20
Kansas City Royals	72	90	.444	21
Boston Red Sox	69	93	.426	24
Cleveland Indians	68	94	.420	25
Minnesota Twins	66	96	.407	27

=== Record vs. opponents ===
2012 American League record Source: MLB Standings Grid – 2012
Team	BAL	BOS	CWS	CLE	DET	KC	LAA	MIN	NYY	OAK	SEA	TB	TEX	TOR	NL
Baltimore	–	13–5	6–2	4–4	3–3	5–4	2–7	5–2	9–9	4–5	8–1	10–8	2–5	11–7	11–7
Boston	5–13	–	6–2	5–3	5–5	4–3	0–6	4–3	5–13	1–8	5–4	9–9	2–6	7–11	11–7
Chicago	2–6	2–6	–	11–7	6–12	6–12	3–5	14–4	5–2	3–3	8–1	4–3	6–3	6–4	9–9
Cleveland	4–4	3–5	7–11	–	10–8	8–10	5–4	6–12	1–5	2–8	4–4	4–4	4–5	2–4	8–10
Detroit	3–3	5–5	12–6	8–10	–	13–5	5–5	10–8	4–6	4–3	1–5	5–2	3–7	4–2	11–7
Kansas City	4–5	3–4	12–6	10–8	5–13	–	4–5	7–11	3–4	5–4	1–7	4–2	4–5	2–6	8–10
Los Angeles	7–2	6–0	5–3	4–5	5–5	5–4	–	6–3	4–5	9–10	11–8	1–9	10–9	4–4	12–6
Minnesota	2–5	3–4	4–14	12–6	8–10	11–7	3–6	–	3–4	4–5	2–8	1–5	2–8	2–5	9–9
New York	9–9	13–5	2–5	5–1	6–4	4–3	5–4	4–3	–	5–5	6–3	8–10	4–3	11–7	13–5
Oakland	5–4	8–1	3–3	8–2	3–4	4–5	10–9	5–4	5–5	–	12–7	5–4	11–8	5–4	10–8
Seattle	1–8	4–5	1–8	4–4	5–1	7–1	8–11	8–2	3–6	7–12	–	4–6	9–10	6–3	8–10
Tampa Bay	8–10	9–9	3–4	4–4	2–5	2–4	9–1	5–1	10–8	4–5	6–4	–	5–4	14–4	9–9
Texas	5–2	6–2	3–6	5–4	7–3	5–4	9–10	8–2	3–4	8–11	10–9	4–5	–	6–3	14–4
Toronto	7–11	11–7	4–6	4–2	2–4	6–2	4–4	5–2	7–11	4–5	3–6	4–14	3–6	–	9–9

- Source: MLB Standings Grid – 2012

=== Roster ===
2012 Los Angeles Angels
Roster
Pitchers: 26,52 David Carpenter; 38 Bobby Cassevah; 37 Scott Downs; 45 Barry Enright; 49 Ernesto Frieri; 65 Steve Geltz; 23 Zack Greinke; 24 Dan Haren; 32 LaTroy Hawkins; 55 Jason Isringhausen; 40 Kevin Jepsen; 63 Nick Maronde; 59 Brad Mills; 35 David Pauley; 43 Garrett Richards; 54 Ervin Santana; 21 Hisanori Takahashi; 64 Andrew Taylor; 63 Rich Thompson; 51 Jordan Walden; 36 Jered Weaver; 57 Jerome Williams; 33 C. J. Wilson	Catchers: 16 Hank Conger; 41 John Hester; 17 Chris Iannetta; 46 Bobby Wilson; Infielders: 2 Erick Aybar; 6 Alberto Callaspo; 13 Maicer Izturis; 47 Howard Kendrick; 8 Kendrys Morales; 5 Albert Pujols; 18 Andrew Romine; 20 Jean Segura	Outfielders: 53 Bobby Abreu; 19 Alexi Amarista; 25 Peter Bourjos; 56 Kole Calhoun; 48 Torii Hunter; 39 Ryan Langerhans; 27 Mike Trout; 44 Mark Trumbo; 10 Vernon Wells	Manager: 14 Mike Scioscia; Coaches: 23,31 Mike Butcher (pitching); 12 Dino Ebel (third base); 80 Jim Eppard (hitting); 60 Tom Gregorio (bullpen catcher); 4 Alfredo Griffin (first base); 7 Mickey Hatcher (hitting); 9 Rob Picciolo (bench); 61 Steve Soliz (bullpen)

== Player stats ==
=== Batting ===
Note: G = Games played; AB = At bats; R = Runs; H = Hits; 2B = Doubles; 3B = Triples; HR = Home runs; RBI = Runs batted in; SB = Stolen bases; BB = Walks; AVG = Batting average; SLG = Slugging average

Player	G	AB	R	H	2B	3B	HR	RBI	SB	BB	AVG	SLG
Albert Pujols	154	607	85	173	50	0	30	105	8	52	.285	.516
Mike Trout	139	559	129	182	27	8	30	83	49	67	.326	.564
Howie Kendrick	147	550	57	158	32	3	8	67	14	29	.287	.400
Mark Trumbo	144	544	66	146	19	3	32	95	4	36	.268	.491
Torii Hunter	140	534	81	167	24	1	16	92	9	38	.313	.451
Erick Aybar	141	517	67	150	31	5	8	45	20	22	.290	.416
Kendrys Morales	134	484	61	132	26	1	22	73	0	31	.273	.467
Alberto Callaspo	138	457	55	115	20	0	10	53	4	56	.252	.361
Maicer Izturis	100	289	35	74	11	0	2	20	17	25	.256	.315
Vernon Wells	77	243	36	56	9	0	11	29	3	16	.230	.403
Chris Iannetta	79	221	27	53	6	1	9	26	1	29	.240	.398
Bobby Wilson	75	171	19	36	5	0	3	13	0	15	.211	.292
Peter Bourjos	101	168	27	37	7	0	3	19	3	15	.220	.315
John Hester	39	85	14	18	1	0	3	4	0	8	.212	.329
Bobby Abreu	8	24	1	5	3	0	0	5	0	2	.208	.333
Kole Calhoun	21	23	2	4	1	0	0	1	1	2	.174	.217
Hank Conger	7	18	0	3	0	0	0	1	0	1	.167	.167
Andrew Romine	12	17	2	7	0	0	0	1	1	3	.412	.412
Jean Segura	1	3	0	0	0	0	0	0	0	0	.000	.000
Ryan Langerhans	2	1	0	0	0	0	0	0	0	0	.000	.000
Alexi Amarista	1	0	1	0	0	0	0	0	0	0	.---	.---
Pitcher totals	162	21	2	2	1	0	0	0	0	2	.095	.143
Team totals	162	5536	767	1518	273	22	187	732	134	449	.274	.433

=== Pitching ===
Note: W = Wins; L = Losses; ERA = Earned run average; G = Games pitched; GS = Games started; SV = Saves; IP = Innings pitched; H = Hits allowed; R = Runs allowed; ER = Earned runs allowed; BB = Walks allowed; SO = Strikeouts

Player	W	L	ERA	G	GS	SV	IP	H	R	ER	BB	SO
C.J. Wilson	13	10	3.83	34	34	0	202.1	181	102	86	91	173
Jered Weaver	20	5	2.81	30	30	0	188.2	147	63	59	45	142
Ervin Santana	9	13	5.16	30	30	0	178.0	165	109	102	61	133
Dan Haren	12	13	4.33	30	30	0	176.2	190	95	85	38	142
Jerome Williams	6	8	4.58	32	15	1	137.2	139	73	70	35	98
Zack Greinke	6	2	3.53	13	13	0	89.1	80	35	35	26	78
Garrett Richards	4	3	4.69	30	9	1	71.0	77	46	37	34	47
Ernesto Frieri	4	2	2.32	56	0	23	54.1	26	15	14	26	80
Jason Isringhausen	3	2	4.14	50	0	0	45.2	44	22	21	19	31
Scott Downs	1	1	3.15	57	0	9	45.2	43	17	16	17	32
Kevin Jepsen	3	2	3.02	49	0	2	44.2	39	17	15	12	38
LaTroy Hawkins	2	3	3.64	48	0	1	42.0	45	20	17	13	23
Hisanori Takahashi	0	3	4.93	42	0	0	42.0	39	24	23	10	41
David Carpenter	1	2	4.76	28	0	0	39.2	42	21	21	17	28
Jordan Walden	3	2	3.46	45	0	1	39.0	35	15	15	18	48
David Pauley	0	1	4.35	5	0	0	10.1	16	6	5	3	4
Nick Maronde	0	0	1.50	12	0	0	6.0	6	1	1	3	7
Brad Mills	1	0	0.00	1	1	0	5.0	3	0	0	0	6
Bobby Cassevah	1	0	7.20	4	0	0	5.0	5	4	4	6	2
Barry Enright	0	0	14.73	3	0	0	3.2	7	6	6	1	0
Rich Thompson	0	1	15.43	2	0	0	2.1	5	4	4	1	3
Andrew Taylor	0	0	11.57	3	0	0	2.1	3	3	3	4	0
Steve Geltz	0	0	4.50	2	0	0	2.0	2	1	1	3	1
Team totals	89	73	4.02	162	162	38	1433.1	1339	699	640	483	1157

== Farm system ==
Level	Team	League	Manager
AAA	Salt Lake Bees	Pacific Coast League	Keith Johnson
AA	Arkansas Travelers	Texas League	Mike Micucci
A	Inland Empire 66ers	California League	Bill Haselman
A	Cedar Rapids Kernels	Midwest League	Jamie Burke
Rookie	AZL Angels	Arizona League	Brent Del Chiaro
Rookie	Orem Owlz	Pioneer League	Tom Kotchman

== See also ==
- Los Angeles Angels
- Angel Stadium

Records
Preceded by 2011	Los Angeles Angels seasons 2012	Succeeded by 2013
