= Orem Owlz =

Minor league baseball team in Utah, USA

- 2001–2020; Orem, Utah

Team logo	Cap insignia

Minor league affiliations
- Class: Rookie Advanced (2001–2020)
- League: Pioneer League (2001–2020)

Major league affiliations
- Team: Los Angeles Angels (2001–2020)

Minor league titles
- League titles (5): 2004; 2005; 2007; 2009; 2016
- Division titles (8): 2001; 2002; 2003; 2004; 2005; 2008; 2009; 2011

Team data
- Name: Orem Owlz (2005–2020); Provo Angels (2001–2004)
- Colors: Red, navy, yellow, gray, white
- Ballpark: UCCU Ballpark (2005–2020); Larry H. Miller Field (2001–2004)

The Orem Owlz were a Minor League Baseball team located in Orem, Utah, United States, from 2001 to 2020. The team competed in the Pioneer League as a Rookie League affiliate of the Los Angeles Angels. The Owlz played their home games at Home of the Owlz on the campus of Utah Valley University. They were previously known as the Provo Angels from 2001 to 2004. In conjunction with a contraction of Minor League Baseball in 2021, the Pioneer League, of which the Owlz had been members since 2001, was converted from an MLB-affiliated Rookie Advanced league to an independent baseball league and granted status as an MLB Partner League. Concurrent to this change, the Owlz relocated to Windsor, Colorado, and became the Northern Colorado Owlz.

== History ==
Formerly known as the Provo Angels (2001–2004), the team originally played at the Larry H. Miller Field on the campus of Brigham Young University in northeastern Provo. After the 2004 season, the team changed ownership and moved from Provo to a new stadium in neighboring Orem.

The Owlz played in the Pioneer League, which was a Rookie League with an abbreviated schedule (short-season). The team won five Pioneer League titles; one while in Provo (2004), and four while in Orem (2005, 2007, 2009, and 2016).

The team is prominently mentioned in the book Odd Man Out: A Year on the Mound with a Minor League Misfit, a memoir recounting the author's one season playing for the Provo Angels.

Team owner Jeff Katofsky planned to relocate the team to Pueblo, Colorado, in 2020, where they would be known as the Pueblo Owlz, but the plan was abandoned due to financial concerns by the city of Pueblo.

Ultimately, they relocated to Windsor, Colorado, in 2021 and became the Northern Colorado Owlz. This move was made in conjunction with a contraction of Minor League Baseball in 2021 in which the Pioneer League was converted from an MLB-affiliated Rookie Advanced league to an independent baseball league and granted status as an MLB Partner League.

== Playoffs ==
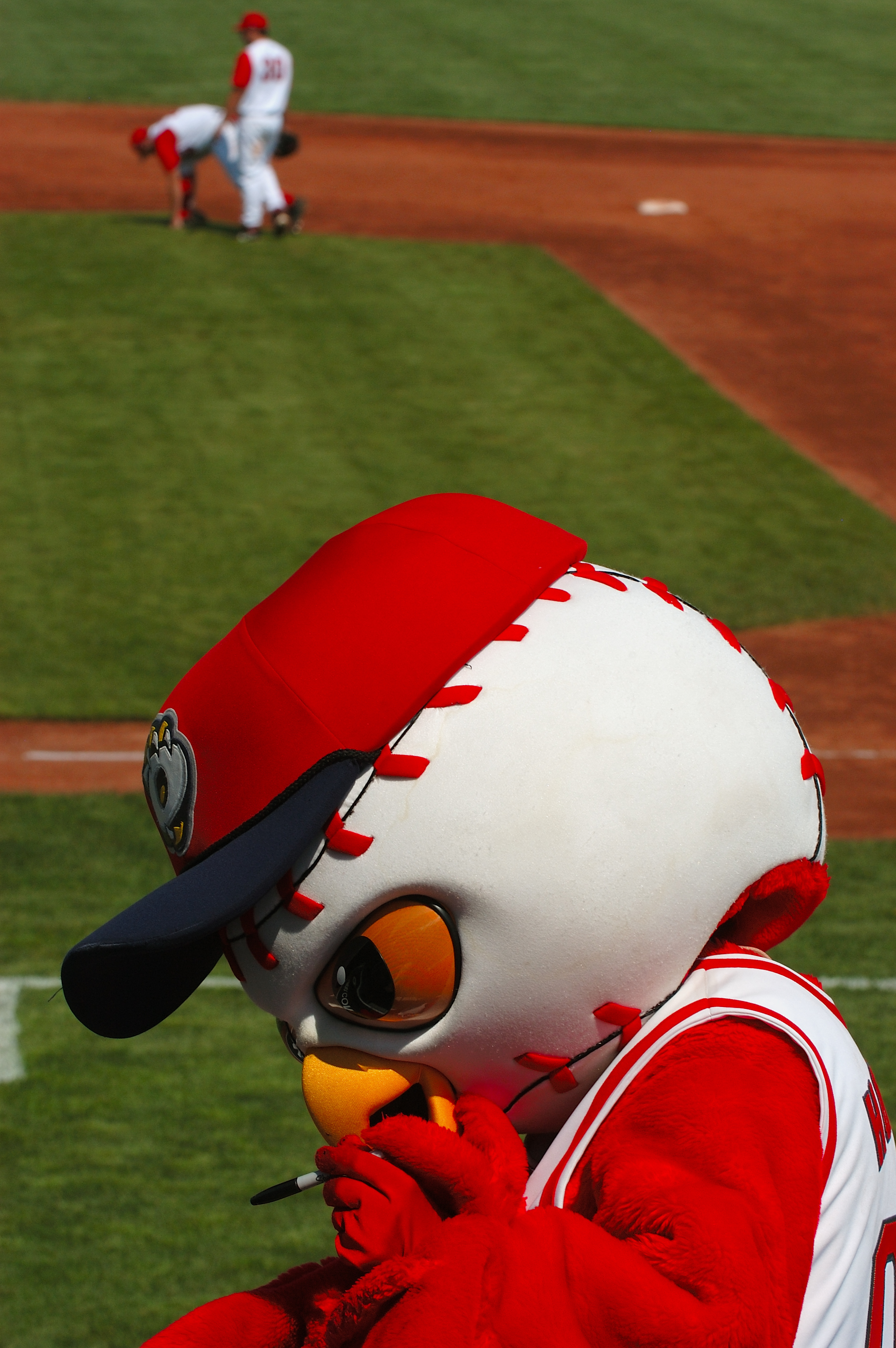
Hootz, the mascot of the Orem Owlz, July 2006

- 2017: Lost to Ogden 2–0 in semifinals.
- 2016: Defeated Ogden 2–1 in semifinals; defeated Billings 2–0 to win championship.
- 2015: Lost to Idaho Falls 2–1 in semifinals.
- 2014: Defeated Ogden 2–0 in semifinals; lost to Billings 2–0 in finals.
- 2011: Lost to Ogden 2–1 in semifinals.
- 2010: Lost to Ogden 2–1 in semifinals.
- 2009: Defeated Ogden 2–0 in semifinals; defeated Missoula 2–1 to win championship.
- 2008: Lost to Great Falls 2–1 in finals.
- 2007: Defeated Great Falls 2–0 to win championship.
- 2005: Defeated Helena 2–0 to win championship.
- 2004: Defeated Billings 2–0 to win championship.
- 2003: Lost to Billings 2–0 in finals.
- 2002: Lost to Great Falls 2–1 in finals.
- 2001: Lost to Billings 2–0 in finals.

== All-stars ==
Provo Angels
Season	Name & Position
2001	Al Corbeil, C Casey Smith, SS; Sam Swenson, OF; Pedro Liriano, RH SP; Jason Dennis, LH SP
2002	Alex Dvorsky, C Ryan Shealy, 1B; Alberto Callaspo, 2B; Erick Aybar, SS
2003	Warner Madrigal, OF; Abel Moreno, RH SP
2004	Sean Rodriguez, SS; Andrew Toussaint, DH; Mitchell Arnold, RP; Tom Kotchman, Mgr.

Orem Owlz
Season	Name & Position
2005	none
2006	Chris Pettit, OF; Sean O'Sullivan, P Tom Kotchman, Mgr.
2007	Jay Brossman, 3B; Robert Fish, P
2008	Luis Jimenez, 3B; Angel Castillo, OF; Roberto Lopez, DH; Jayson Miller, P Will Smith, P
2009	Dillon Baird, 1B; Tom Kotchman, Mgr.
2010	none
2011	Taylor Lindsey, 2B; Ryan Jones, OF
2012	Wade Hinkle, 1B; Wendell Soto, SS; Joel Capote, OF; Michael Snyder, DH; Gabriel Perez, P
2013	Cal Towery, 3B; José Rondón, SS; Jonathan Van Eaton, P
2014	Michael Bolaski, P
2015	Michael Pierson, 3B; Taylor Ward, C Joe Gatto, P Kyle Survance Jr., OF
2017	Elvin Rodriguez, P Chris Rodriguez, P Daniel Procopio, P Ryan Vega, OF; Leonardo Rivas, INF; Isaac Mattson, P
2018	Kevin Maitan, SS; Jake Lee, P
2019	D'Shawn Knowles, OF; Jeremiah Jackson, DH

== Players with MLB experience ==
Players are listed by the season(s) they played for the Provo Angels (2001–2004) or Orem Owlz (2005–present).

Provo Angels
Season	Players	Ref
2001	Steve Andrade, Nick Gorneault, Casey Kotchman, Pedro Liriano, Jeff Mathis, Dallas McPherson, Ervin Santana, Steven Shell, Jake Woods	
2002	Erick Aybar, Matthew Brown, Alberto Callaspo, Edwar Ramirez, Rafael Rodríguez, Joe Saunders	
2003	Matthew Brown, Daniel Davidson, Brian Esposito, Howie Kendrick, Warner Madrigal, Fernando Rodriguez, Reggie Willits, Bobby Wilson, Brandon Wood	
2004	Alexi Casilla, Fernando Rodriguez, Sean Rodriguez	

Orem Owlz
Season	Players	Ref
2005	Nick Adenhart, José Arredondo, Martín Maldonado, Bobby Mosebach, Mark Trumbo	
2006	Trevor Bell, Peter Bourjos, Barret Browning, Bobby Cassevah, David Herndon, Darren O'Day, Sean O'Sullivan, Anthony Ortega, Chris Pettit	
2007	Ryan Brasier, Bobby Cassevah, Jeremy Moore, Efren Navarro, Andrew Romine, Mason Tobin, Jordan Walden	
2008	Buddy Boshers, Steve Geltz, Luis Jiménez, Michael Kohn, Alberto Rosario, Will Smith, Andrew Taylor	
2009	Buddy Boshers, David Carpenter, Patrick Corbin, Garrett Richards, Jean Segura, Tyler Skaggs	
2010	Kole Calhoun, Kaleb Cowart, Donn Roach, A. J. Schugel	
2011	Jett Bandy, Mike Clevinger, Kaleb Cowart, C. J. Cron, Nick Maronde	
2012	Austin Adams†, Jairo Díaz, Mike Morin, Chris O'Grady, José Rondón, Michael Roth, Joey Krehbiel, Sherman Johnson, Anthony Bemboom	
2013	Alan Busenitz, Mike Clevinger, Keynan Middleton, Chris O'Grady, José Rondón, Victor Alcántara, Yency Almonte, Kyle McGowin	
2014	Greg Mahle, Keynan Middleton, Eduardo Paredes, Justin Anderson, Michael Hermosillo, Jake Jewell	
2015	Jaime Barría, Michael Hermosillo, David Fletcher, Taylor Ward, Jared Walsh	
2016	Rey Navarro, Cory Rasmus, Ashur Tolliver, José Suárez, Matt Thaiss	
2017	Austin D. Adams, Austin L. Adams	

== See also ==
- Orem Owlz players
- Provo Angels players
