= Kendrys Morales =

Cuban baseball player (born 1983)

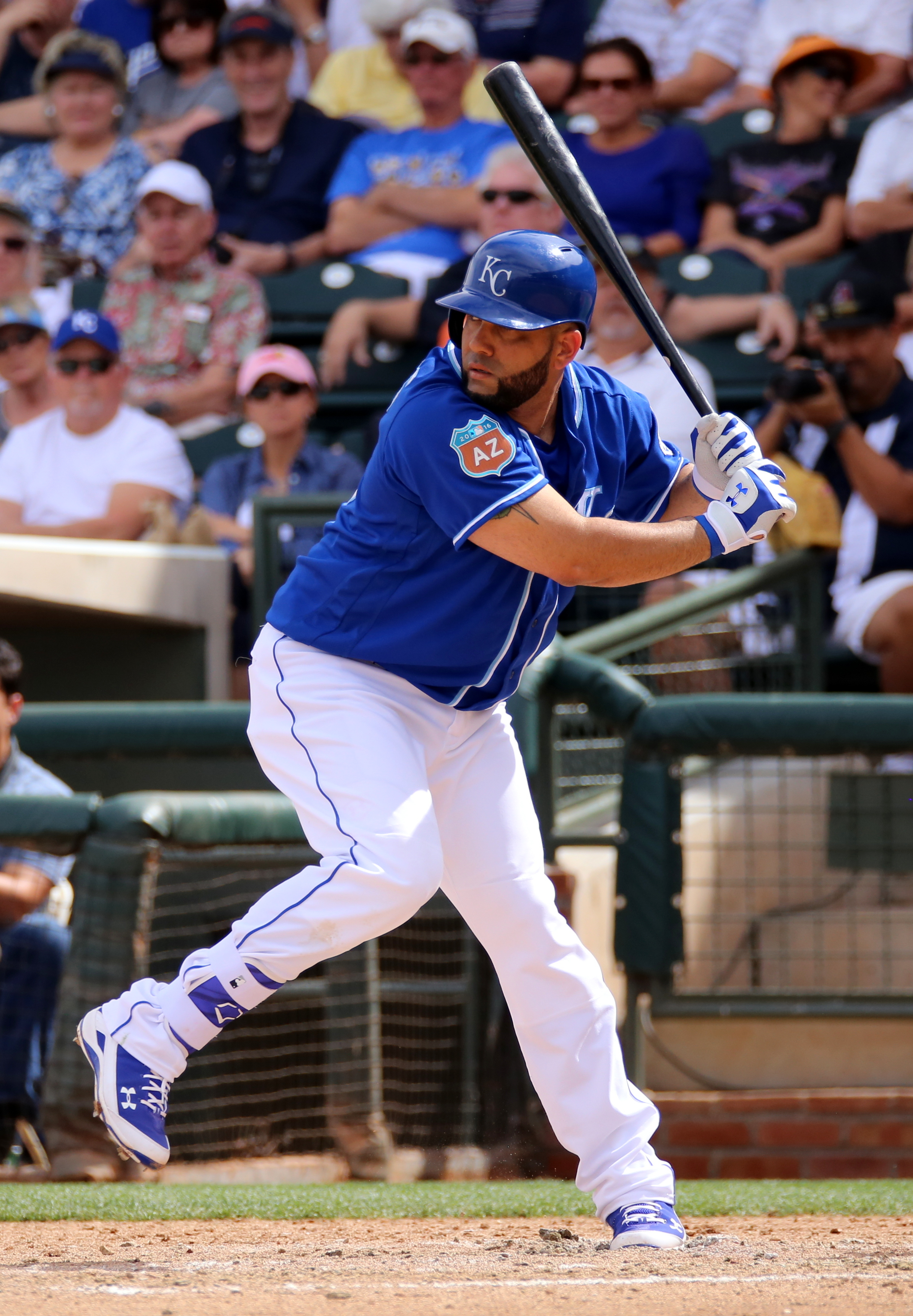
- Morales with the Kansas City Royals in 2016
- Designated hitter / First baseman
- Born: June 20, 1983 (age 43); Fomento, Cuba
- Batted: Switch Threw: Right

MLB debut
- May 23, 2006, for the Los Angeles Angels of Anaheim

Last MLB appearance
- June 11, 2019, for the New York Yankees

MLB statistics
- Batting average: .265
- Home runs: 213
- Runs batted in: 740
- Stats at Baseball Reference

Teams
- Los Angeles Angels of Anaheim (2006–2010, 2012); Seattle Mariners (2013); Minnesota Twins (2014); Seattle Mariners (2014); Kansas City Royals (2015–2016); Toronto Blue Jays (2017–2018); Oakland Athletics (2019); New York Yankees (2019)

Career highlights and awards
- World Series champion (2015); Silver Slugger Award (2015)
Medals
Men's baseball
Representing Cuba
Baseball World Cup
Gold medal – first place	2003 Havana	Team
Intercontinental Cup
Gold medal – first place	2002 Havana	Team

Kendrys Morales Rodríguez (born June 20, 1983), previously known as Kendry Morales, is a Cuban-Dominican former professional baseball designated hitter and first baseman who played in Major League Baseball (MLB) for the Los Angeles Angels of Anaheim, Seattle Mariners, Minnesota Twins, Kansas City Royals, Toronto Blue Jays, Oakland Athletics, and the New York Yankees.

Morales is perhaps most infamous for suffering an ankle injury on May 29, 2010, during a celebration of his walk-off grand slam, which kept him out of Major League Baseball for nearly two years. In 2015 as a member of the Royals, Morales won a Silver Slugger Award and was a member of the Royals' 2015 World Series championship team.

== Cuban career ==
Morales played in Cuba's equivalent of the North American Triple-A level. With 16- to 17-year-olds in the category, he was the first starter of the pitching staff, and fourth in the batting order, and had the ability to hit home runs from both sides of the plate.

Morales joined the Cuba national baseball team in 2002 and immediately became a star player—despite being the first teenager to make the team in nearly 20 years. He was the cleanup hitter on the team during its dramatic 2003 World Cup championship. His grand slam in the final round against Taiwan secured a 6–3 Cuban victory, one game after hitting a home run that provided the winning runs against Brazil.

In 2002, the first of his two-and-a-half full seasons with Havana's Industriales of the Cuban National Series, Morales had a batting average of .324 with 21 home runs and 82 runs batted in (RBIs). He set seven rookie records in the process (including HR and RBIs) and was named the league's Rookie of the Year. In his second season, he suffered an injury and did not hit as many home runs as in his rookie season, but he finished with a .391 batting average.

Morales' stardom in Cuba was short-lived, however. In November 2003, he was sent back to Cuba from Panama during the qualifying round of the 2004 Olympics, for making contact with a sports agent; he did not play for the national team again.

=== Leaving Cuba ===
By early 2004, Cuba's national team and the Industriales banned Morales from their teams for disciplinary reasons due to their belief that he had met with people in an attempt to flee the nation. Morales denies this accusation, telling a reporter "That's not true. I never talked to any agent. But from that moment on, I just wanted to leave. I tried to do it several times without success, occasionally ending up in jail." He escaped on a raft in June 2004 to the shores of southern Florida, his eighth attempt at escape.

As is a practice of baseball players who defect from Cuba, Morales chose to establish residency outside of the United States, in order to avoid being subjected to the Major League Baseball draft, which applies to residents of North America. He relocated to the Dominican Republic, where he was privately scouted by several major-league teams, as he could be signed as a free agent. Preston Gómez, in his role as consultant to Los Angeles Angels general manager Bill Stoneman, ended up signing Morales to a six-year deal worth US$3 million up front in December 2004. Morales played winter ball in the Dominican Professional Baseball League (LIDOM) for the Estrellas Orientales to keep himself in game shape.

== Professional career ==
=== Minor league career ===
By the spring of 2005, the Angels hoped to have Morales practice in the Cactus League to get ready for a quick ascension through their farm system or possibly even make the team as the designated hitter. Because he was not yet a citizen, the Dominican government held up granting Morales the necessary passport to fly back to the U.S. for several months. He was not able to get all his paperwork in order until late May and he finally made his minor league debut on May 21 for the Single-A Rancho Cucamonga Quakes. After three weeks (his batting average was .344, with five home runs), he was moved up to Double-A Arkansas, where he was second on the team in home runs despite playing there for only half the season. When that season ended, he was chosen by the Angels to play for the Surprise Scorpions of the Arizona Fall League.

=== Los Angeles Angels of Anaheim ===
Morales had a strong spring training in 2006 for the Angels, but failed to make the 25-man roster.

He ultimately made his Major League debut on May 23, 2006, playing first base and going 3-for-5, including a home run in his second at bat, versus the Texas Rangers. Thereafter he performed well enough to be the Angels' regular first baseman until his eventual demotion back to Triple-A on July 23, 2006.

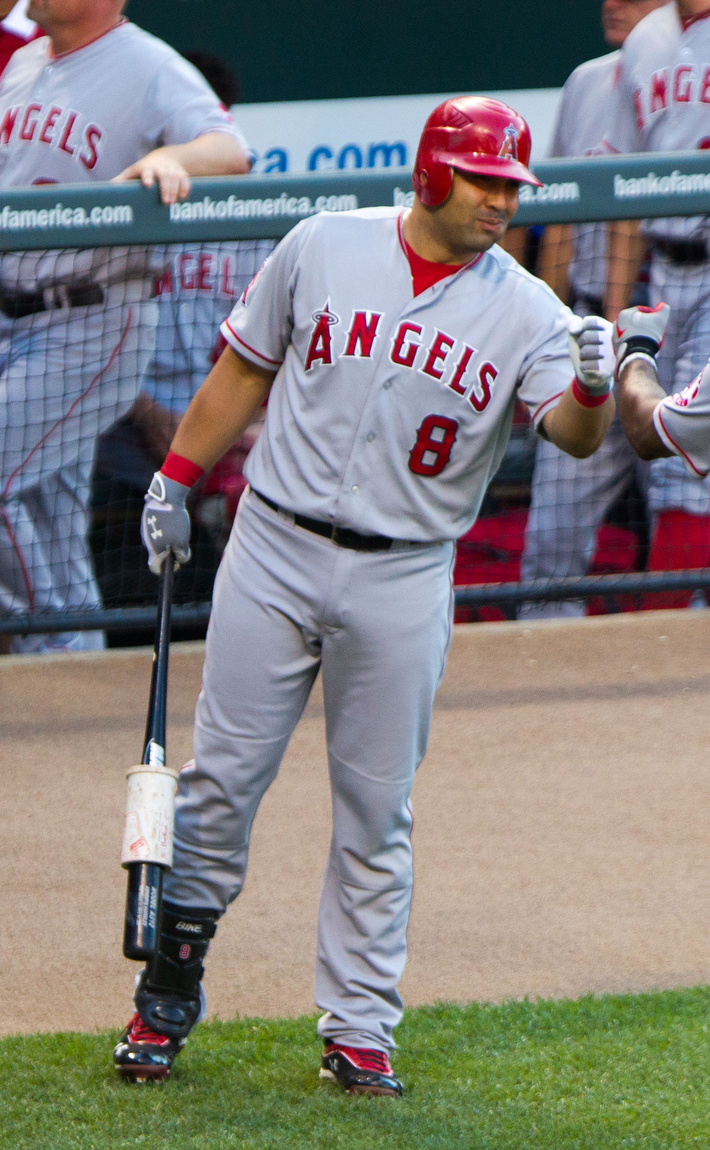
Morales with the Los Angeles Angels of Anaheim in 2012

==== 2009 season ====
Morales enjoyed a breakout year in his first full season. He hit 34 home runs and slugged .569, ranking second in the AL, behind eventual AL MVP Joe Mauer.

Morales was promoted to starting first baseman after Mark Teixeira (the Angels' first baseman for the 2008 season) left the Angels as a free agent in the winter of 2008. Morales said of the timing of his promotion, "The guys that played ahead of me were seasoned players, and I didn't deserve to play in the big leagues yet. The one thing I thought about -- not how long I had to wait -- was just to concentrate on playing well once that opportunity came."

He hit well in the first half, and hit extremely well in the second half of 2009, and was named AL Player of the Month in August when he drove in 33 runs in 28 games with 10 homers, batting .385 and slugging .734. His performance led to talk of him being a possible American League MVP, eventually placing 5th in MVP voting behind Mauer, Teixeira, Derek Jeter, and Miguel Cabrera.

==== 2010 season ====
Morales hit a walk-off grand slam off Brandon League to end a 10-inning 5–1 victory over the Seattle Mariners at Angel Stadium of Anaheim on May 29, 2010. Approaching his celebrating teammates, he jumped up with the intention of stomping on home plate instead of simply stepping on it. His awkward landing resulted in a fracture in his lower left leg, placing him immediately on the disabled list. The injury required surgery, and he missed the rest of the 2010 season. In 51 games in the 2010 season, Morales hit .290 with 11 home runs and 39 RBIs.

==== 2011 season ====
On May 11, 2011, it was announced that Morales, still sidelined by his injured ankle from 2010, would miss the whole 2011 season due to complications in his rehabilitation from surgery on the ankle.

==== 2012 season ====
On March 22, 2012, nearly two years after his ankle injury, Morales returned to the lineup in a spring training game against the Kansas City Royals. On April 16, he hit his first home run since his 2010 injury.

On July 30, 2012, Morales hit two home runs in the same inning (one left-handed and the other right-handed). He became only the third player in MLB history to homer both left and right in the same inning. He finished the 2012 season with a .273 batting average, 22 home runs, and 73 RBI.

=== Seattle Mariners ===
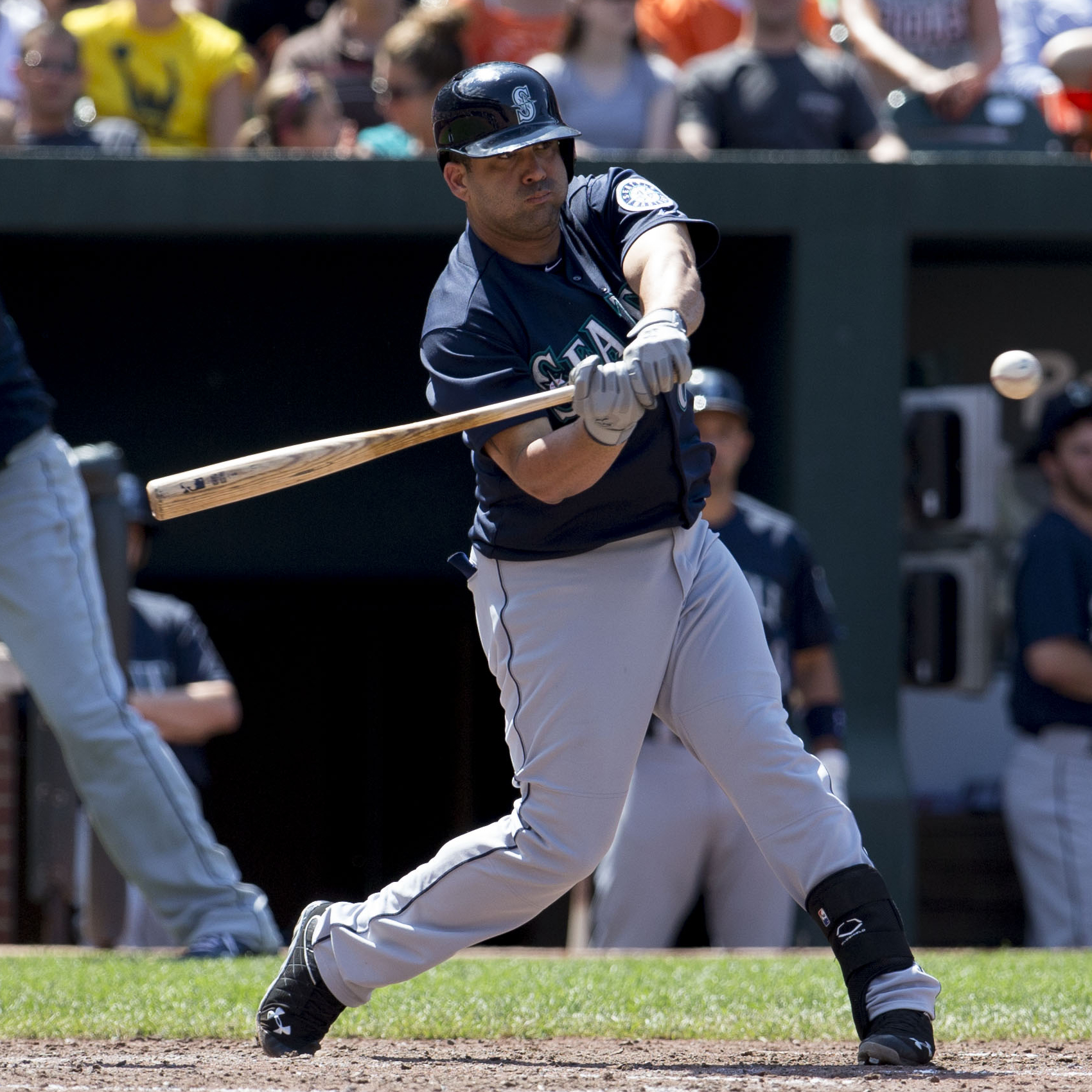
Morales batting for the Seattle Mariners in 2013

On December 19, 2012, the Angels traded Morales to the Seattle Mariners for pitcher Jason Vargas.

On June 23, 2013, Morales hit a first-pitch three-run home run in the 10th inning against the Oakland Athletics after subbing for Brendan Ryan, leading to a 6–3 Mariners win at Safeco Field. After rounding the bases, he gently stepped on home plate. On July 2, 2013, he hit two home runs and had 6 RBIs in a 9–2 win over the division-leading Texas Rangers. On August 26, 2013, Morales was claimed off waivers by an unknown team; however, he was not traded within 48 hours of the waiver claim, meaning the Mariners pulled him back from waivers.

On September 4, Morales hit a tiebreaking two-run homer off the Kansas City Royals in the top of the ninth inning; the Mariners went on to win the game, 6–4. It was the only game the Mariners won during the four-game series.

=== Minnesota Twins ===
The Mariners made Morales a qualifying offer after the 2013 season, which he rejected. He remained unsigned as of Opening Day. On June 8, 2014, Morales agreed to terms with the Minnesota Twins on a one-year contract and a prorated portion of $12 million, worth approximately $7.4 million.

=== Return to Seattle Mariners ===
On July 24, 2014, Morales was traded to the Seattle Mariners in exchange for pitcher Stephen Pryor.

=== Kansas City Royals ===
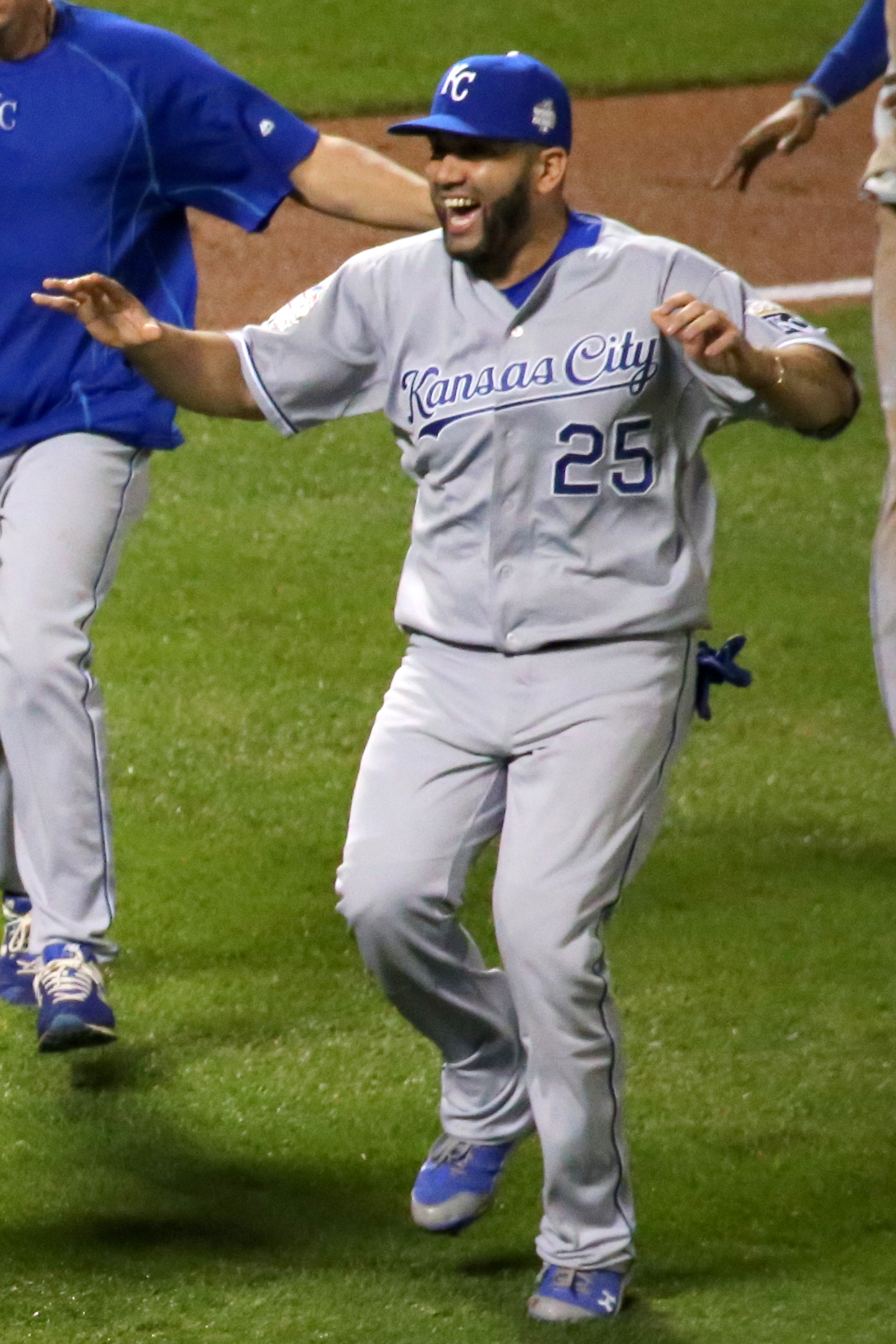
Morales celebrates the final out of the 2015 World Series

In December 2014, Morales signed a two-year, $17 million contract with the Kansas City Royals. Morales finished the 2015 season with 106 RBIs, his highest since his 2009 season with the Angels.

On September 20, 2015, Morales hit three home runs (which tied a Royals record), and had 15 total bases (which set a Royals record) in a 10–3 Royals win over the Detroit Tigers. He was just the third player to homer three times at Comerica park, despite driving in just three runs on the day. He went 4–4 with 3 homers, a triple, and a walk. On October 14, in the winner-take-all game 5 of the American League Divisional Series against the Houston Astros, Morales hit a three-run homer in the eighth inning to secure a 7–2 Royals win.

Hitting .295 with 22 home runs, 106 RBIs, and 39 doubles, while seeing the lowest percentage of fastballs of all MLB hitters (47.8%), Morales was named the recipient of the 2015 Edgar Martínez Award, an honor presented annually to the most outstanding designated hitter in the American League.

After coming of his great 2015 campaign, Morales struggled at the start of 2016. Before June, he had a .193 average; after getting a 4-game break to regather himself mentally, Morales finished June with a .262 average and was the Royals' home run leader on the season. On November 4, Morales declined his option with the Royals and became a free agent.

=== Toronto Blue Jays ===
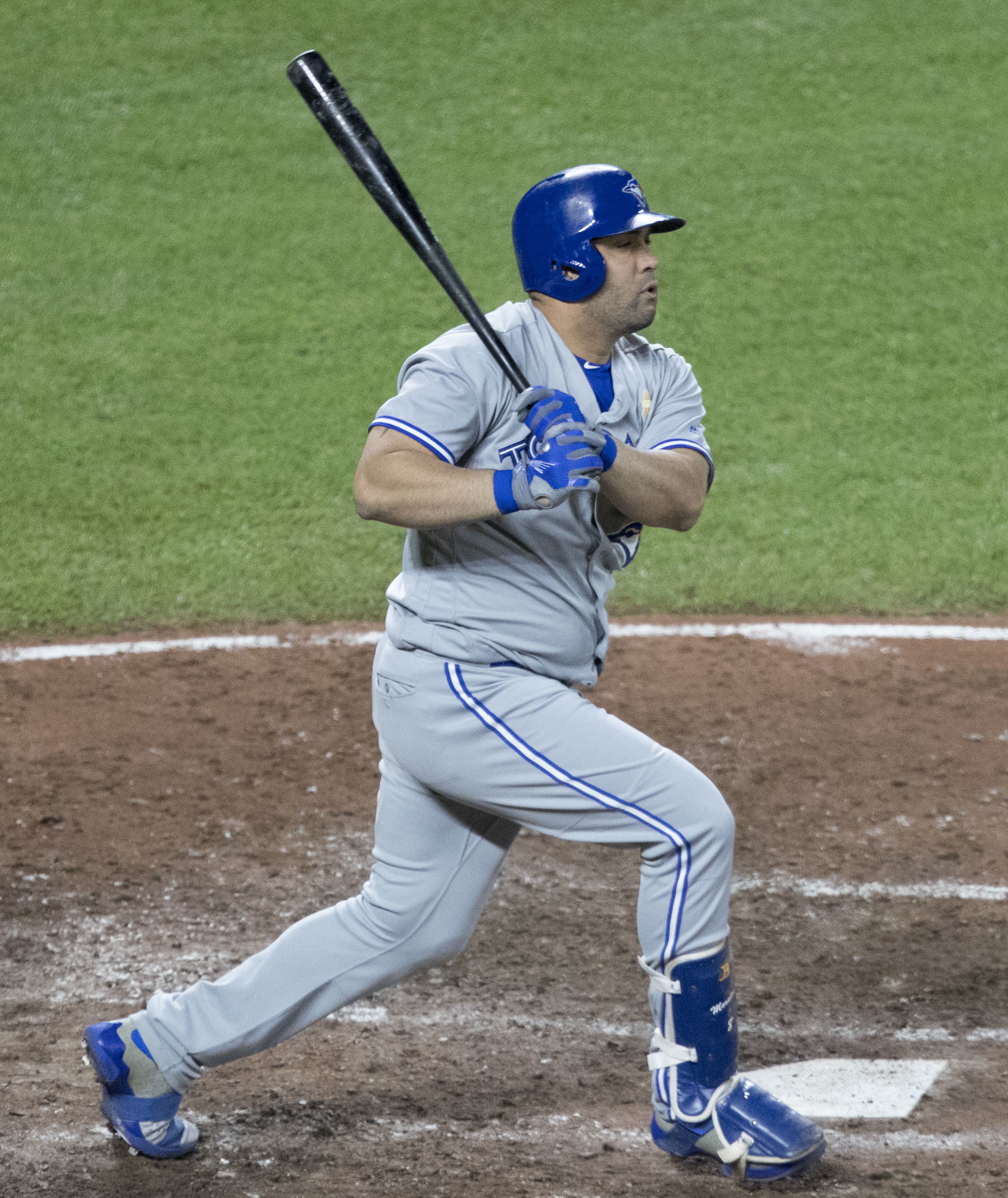
Morales with the Toronto Blue Jays in 2017

On November 11, 2016, Morales agreed to a three-year, $33 million contract with the Toronto Blue Jays. The contract became official on November 18. On August 31, 2017, Morales became the first player in Blue Jays franchise history to have 4 hits, 3 home runs, and 7 RBIs in the same game when he did so in an 11–8 win against the Baltimore Orioles. Morales made his major league debut as a pitcher on May 20, 2018, and pitched a hitless ninth inning for the Blue Jays in a 9–2 loss to the Oakland Athletics. On July 8, 2018, Morales hit his 200th career home run off Domingo Germán of the New York Yankees. Starting on August 19, Morales hit a home run and continued a seven-game home run hit streak ending on August 26 to record the longest such streak in Blue Jays franchise history, and became the seventh person in MLB history to accomplish the feat. His accomplishments during the week of August 20–26 earned him the AL Player of the Week award.

=== Oakland Athletics ===
On March 27, 2019, the Blue Jays traded Morales and cash considerations to the Oakland Athletics for minor league infielder Jesus Lopez and international bonus money. On May 13, he was designated for assignment.

=== New York Yankees ===
On May 14, 2019, the Athletics traded Morales to the New York Yankees for cash considerations or a player to be named later. On June 25, 2019, the Yankees designated Morales for assignment. Morales was released on July 2.

=== Retirement ===
Morales announced his retirement from baseball on February 7, 2020 after 13 MLB seasons.

== Personal life ==
Morales and his wife, Yarley, have 2 children: Hanely and Kendrys Jr. Morales has an older daughter: Andrea, from a previous relationship. Until March 2011, he was professionally known as Kendry Morales due to a typographical error.

Preceded by Bobby Abreu	American League Player of the Month; August 2009	Succeeded by Billy Butler
