= Alberto Callaspo =

Venezuelan baseball player (born 1983)

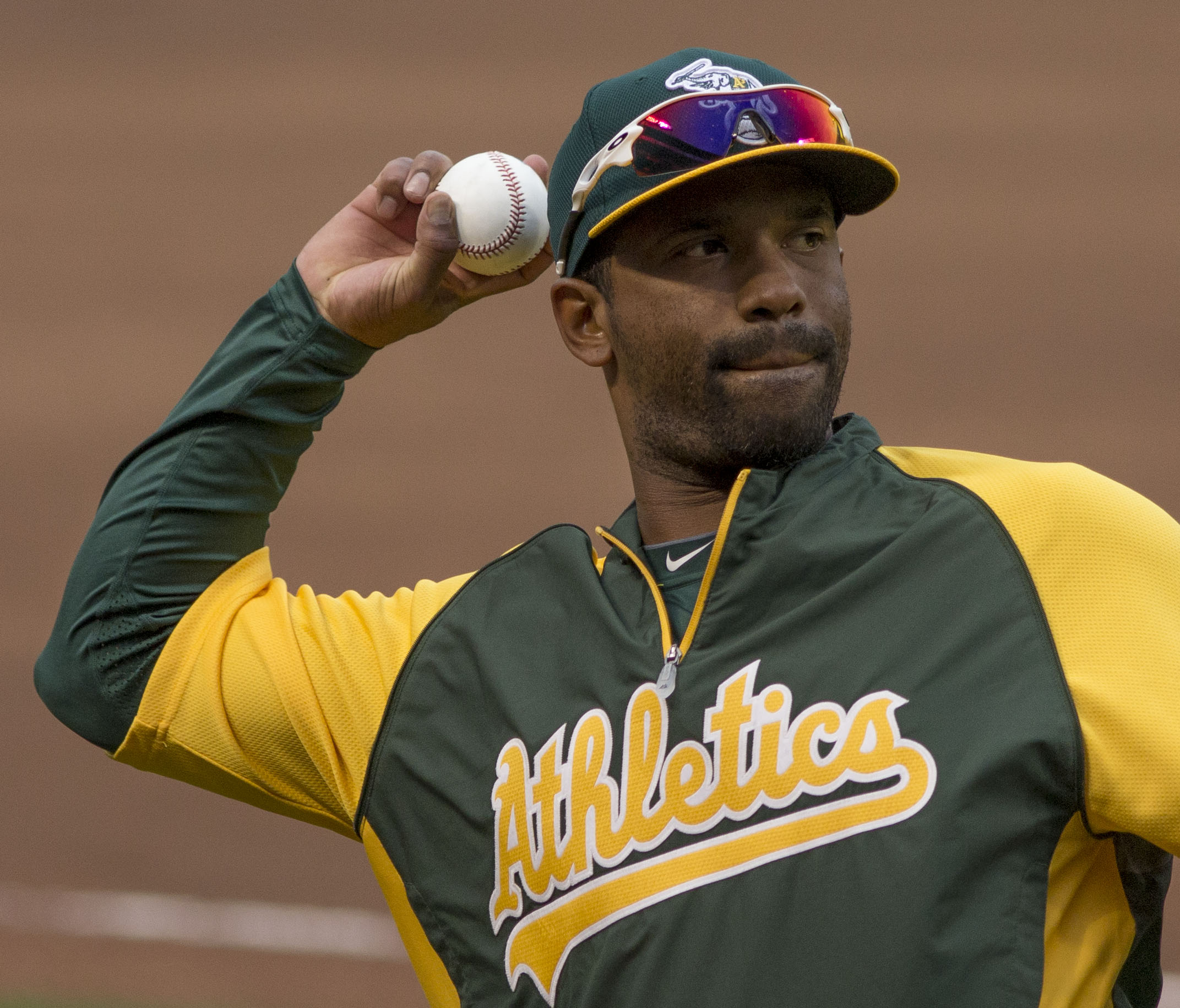
- Callaspo with the Oakland Athletics

Senadores de Caracas – No. 33
- Third baseman / Second baseman
- Born: April 19, 1983 (age 43); Maracay, Venezuela
- Batted: Switch Threw: Right

MLB debut
- August 6, 2006, for the Arizona Diamondbacks

Last MLB appearance
- August 19, 2015, for the Los Angeles Dodgers

MLB statistics
- Batting average: .265
- Home runs: 52
- Runs batted in: 369
- Stats at Baseball Reference

Teams
- Arizona Diamondbacks (2006–2007); Kansas City Royals (2008–2010); Los Angeles Angels of Anaheim (2010–2013); Oakland Athletics (2013–2014); Atlanta Braves (2015); Los Angeles Dodgers (2015)

Alberto José Callaspo Brito (/kaɪˈæspoʊ/, Spanish: [alˈβeɾto xoˈse kaˈʎaspo]; born April 19, 1983) is a Venezuelan professional baseball infielder for the Senadores de Caracas of the Venezuelan Major League. He played in Major League Baseball (MLB) for the Arizona Diamondbacks, Kansas City Royals, Los Angeles Angels of Anaheim, Oakland Athletics, Atlanta Braves and Los Angeles Dodgers. Callaspo has primarily played third base and second base during his career.

== Career ==
=== Anaheim/Los Angeles Angels ===
Callaspo was originally signed by the then-Anaheim Angels in 2001, playing for the Aguilas Cibaeñas of Dominican Summer League. In 2002, Callaspo batted .338 with 16 doubles, 10 triples, three home runs and 60 RBI in 70 games with the rookie-level Provo Angels, where he was voted by Baseball America as a Pioneer League All-Star and was named to Pioneer League All-Star team.

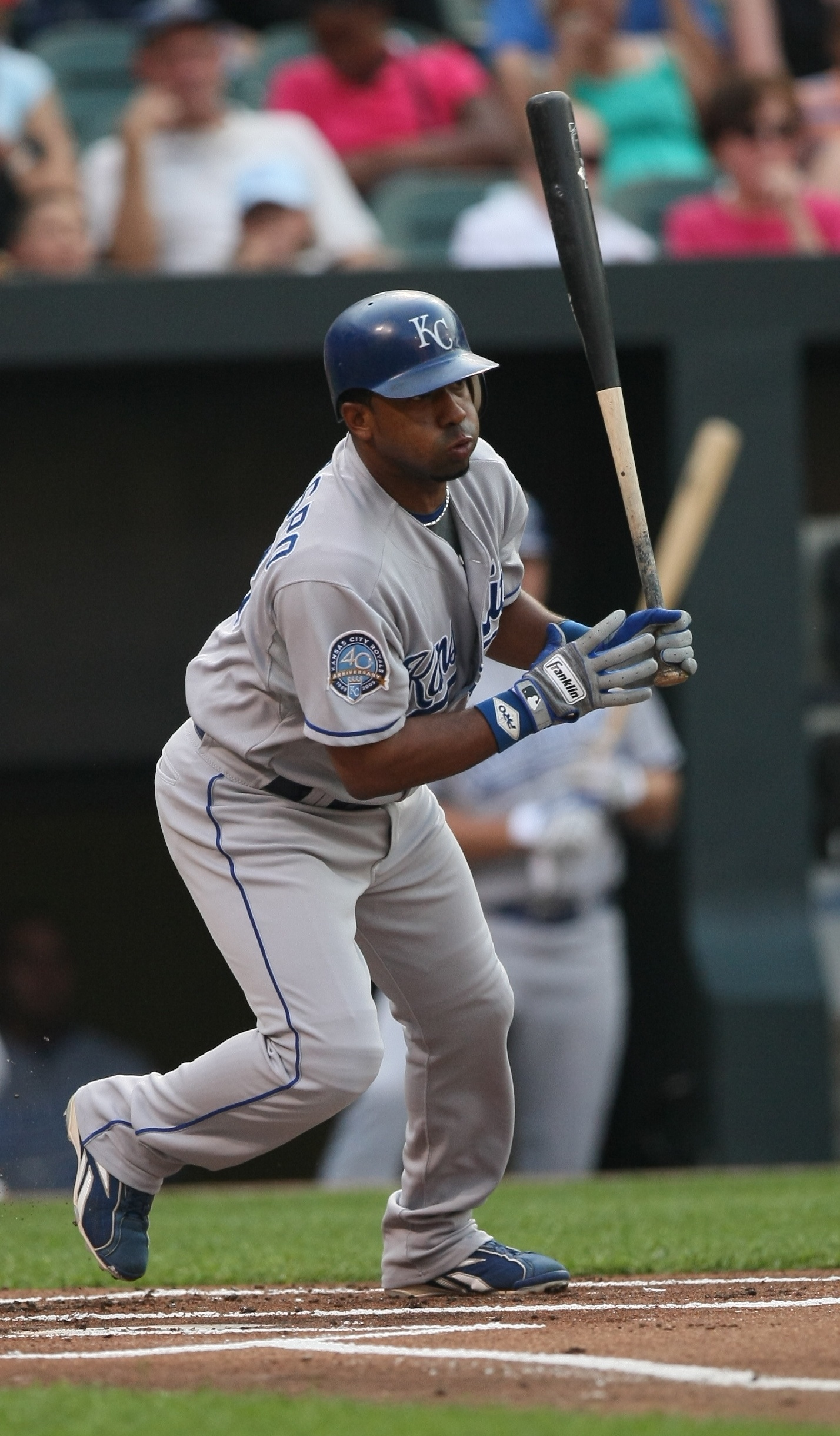
Callaspo batting for the Kansas City Royals in 2009

In 2003, Callaspo led the Midwest League with a .327 average and 38 doubles with the Cedar Rapids Kernels. Callaspo spent 2004 with the Double-A Arkansas Travelers, where he was selected for the Texas League All-Star game. Callaspo split 2005 with the Travelers and Triple-A Salt Lake Stingers. He again made the Texas League All-Star Game and was named to the Texas League Post-Season All-Star Team.

=== Arizona Diamondbacks ===
On March 1, 2006, the Angels traded Callaspo to the Arizona Diamondbacks in exchange for pitcher Jason Bulger. He began 2006 with the Triple-A Tucson Sidewinders, and was named the Diamondbacks' Minor League Player of the Year following the season.

Callaspo was subsequently called up by the Diamondbacks partway through the 2006 season. In 23 appearances for the Diamondbacks during his rookie campaign, Callaspo slashed .238/.298/.310 with six RBI. He also split the 2007 season between Arizona and Tucson. In 56 appearances for Arizona, Callaspo batted .215/.265/.271 with seven RBI and one stolen base.

=== Kansas City Royals ===
On December 14, 2007, the Diamondbacks traded Callaspo to the Kansas City Royals in exchange for pitcher Billy Buckner. He split the 2008 season between the big-league club and Triple-A Omaha Royals. In 74 games for Kansas City, Callaspo hit .305/.361/.371 with 16 RBI and two stolen bases.

In 2009, Callaspo tied for the major league lead in errors by a second baseman, with 17, and had the lowest fielding percentage of any starting second baseman (.973). Across 155 appearances for Kansas City, he slashed .300/.356/.457 with career-highs in home runs (11) and RBI (73).

Callaspo played in 88 games for the Royals to begin the 2010 season, batting .275/.308/.410 with eight home runs, 43 RBI, and three stolen bases.

=== Los Angeles Angels of Anaheim (second stint) ===
On July 22, 2010, Callaspo was traded to the Los Angeles Angels of Anaheim in exchange for pitchers Sean O'Sullivan and Will Smith. In 58 appearances down the stretch for Los Angeles, he batted .249/.291/.315 with two home runs, 13 RBI, and two stolen bases.

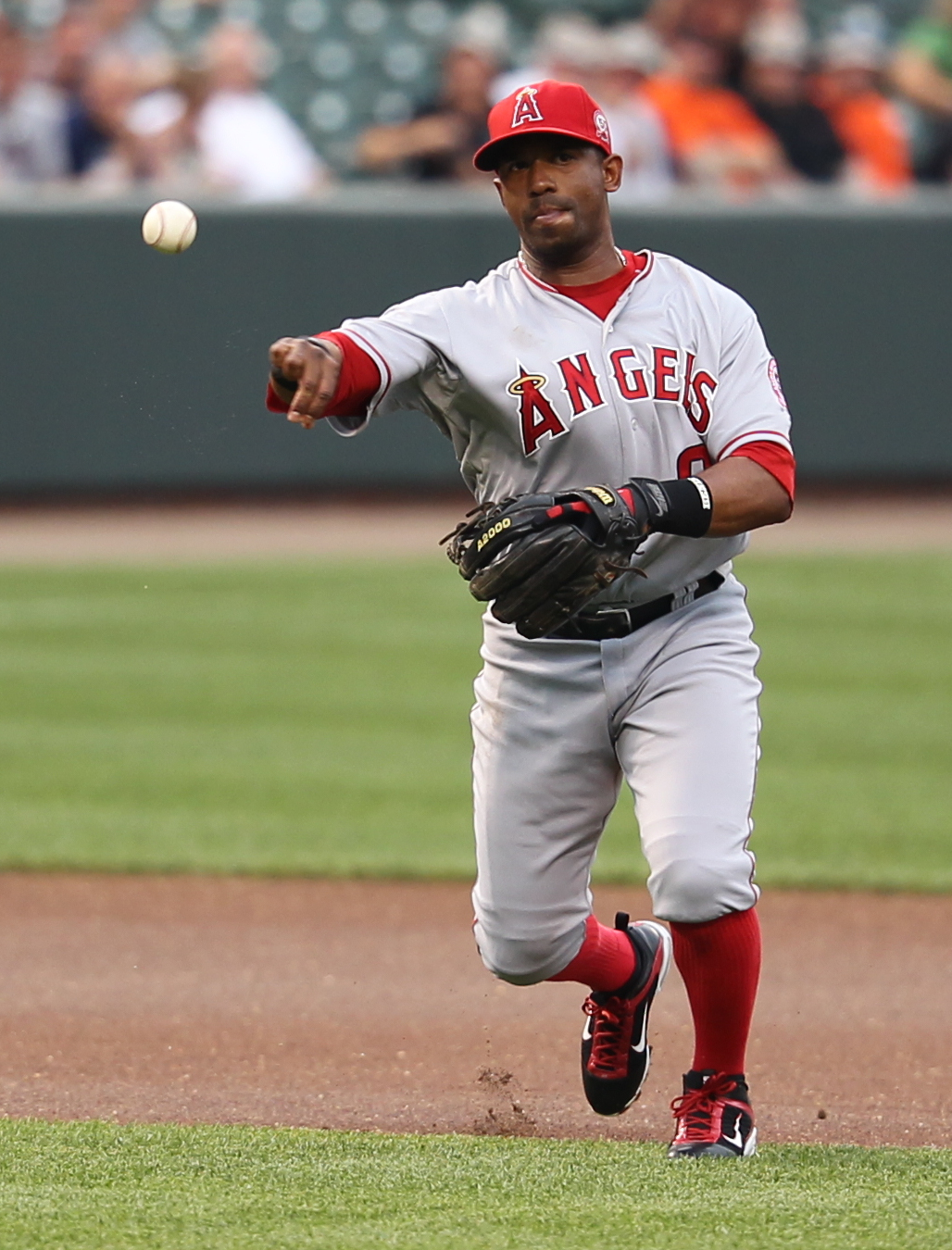
Callaspo playing for the Los Angeles Angels of Anaheim in 2011

Callaspo made 141 appearances for the Angels during the 2011 season, slashing .288/.366/.375 with six home runs, 48 RBI, and eight stolen bases.

On January 16, 2012, Callaspo signed a one-year contract with the Angels worth $3.15 million, thus avoiding arbitration. In 138 appearances for Los Angeles during the season, he hit .252/.331/.361 with 10 home runs, 53 RBI, and four stolen bases.

On February 5, 2013, the Angels finalized a two-year contract with Callaspo worth $8.975 million. In 86 appearances for the Angels to begin the year, he posted a .252/.324/.347 batting line with five home runs and 36 RBI.

=== Oakland Athletics ===
On July 30, 2013, Callaspo was traded to the Oakland Athletics in exchange for Grant Green He played in 50 contests for Oakland during the remainder of the season, hitting .270/.350/.409 with five home runs and 22 RBI.

Callaspo made 127 appearances for Oakland during the 2014 season, slashing .223/.290/.290 with four home runs and 39 RBI.

=== Atlanta Braves ===
On December 9, 2014, Callaspo agreed to a one-year, $3 million contract with the Atlanta Braves. He played in 37 games for the team during the 2015 campaign, batting .206/.293/.252 with one home run and eight RBI.

=== Los Angeles Dodgers ===
On May 27, 2015, Callaspo was traded to the Los Angeles Dodgers (with Ian Thomas, Eric Stults, and Juan Jaime) in exchange for Juan Uribe and Chris Withrow. In 60 games for the Dodgers, he hit .260/.336/.301 with seven RBI. Callaspo was designated for assignment by Los Angeles on August 19; he was released after clearing waivers on August 27.

=== Bridgeport Bluefish ===
On March 28, 2017, Callaspo signed with the Bridgeport Bluefish of the Atlantic League of Professional Baseball. In 34 appearances for Bridgeport, Callaspo hit .344/.417/.516 with four home runs and 15 RBI.

=== Vaqueros Unión Laguna ===
On May 30, 2017, Callaspo signed with the Vaqueros Unión Laguna of the Mexican League. In 58 appearances for the Vaqueros, Callaspo slashed .301/.365/.379 with three home runs, 33 RBI, and one stolen base.

=== Leones de Yucatán ===
On March 1, 2018, Callaspo was traded to the Leones de Yucatán of the Mexican League in exchange for former MLB player Yuniesky Betancourt. In 31 appearances for Yucatán, Callaspo hit .290/.362/.333 with no home runs, 12 RBI, and one stolen base.

=== Algodoneros de Unión Laguna ===
On May 1, 2018, Callaspo was traded to the Algodoneros de Unión Laguna of the Mexican League. In 23 appearances for Unión Laguna, he batted .258/.330/.366 with one home run and 13 RBI. Callaspo was released by the Algodoneros on June 4.

=== West Virginia Power/Charleston Dirty Birds ===
On December 7, 2020, Callaspo signed with the Welland Jackfish of the Intercounty Baseball League (IBL). Before the start of the season, on May 28, 2021, Callaspo signed with the West Virginia Power of the Atlantic League of Professional Baseball. Callaspo slashed .335/.469/.461 with six home runs and 57 RBI in 99 games for the Power. He became a free agent following the season.

On March 4, 2022, Callaspo re-signed with the team, now named the Charleston Dirty Birds. He was released by the team on May 19, after three games going 5-for-8 (.625) with one home run and five RBI.

=== Guerreros de Lara ===
In 2025, Callaspo signed with the Guerreros de Lara of the Venezuelan Major League.

== Personal life ==
Callaspo was arrested at his home on May 10, 2007, by Phoenix police for domestic violence, but the charges against him were later dropped. He was placed on the restricted list without pay the day after the arrest, but the Major League Baseball Players Association filed a grievance on his behalf and he was reinstated within a week.

In 2011, Mariangely Santana Pérez sued Callaspo, claiming he was the father of her son. The Orange County Superior Court later determined that Callaspo was not the biological father.

== See also ==
- List of players from Venezuela in Major League Baseball
