= Bobby Cassevah =

American baseball player (born 1985)

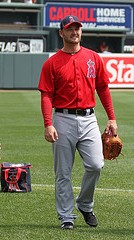
- Cassevah in 2011
- Relief pitcher
- Born: September 11, 1985 (age 40); Jacksonville, Florida, U.S.
- Batted: Right Threw: Right

MLB debut
- April 9, 2010, for the Los Angeles Angels of Anaheim

Last MLB appearance
- June 6, 2012, for the Los Angeles Angels of Anaheim

MLB statistics
- Win–loss record: 3–3
- Earned run average: 3.20
- Strikeouts: 34
- Stats at Baseball Reference

Teams
- Los Angeles Angels of Anaheim (2010–2012)

Robert Alan Cassevah (born September 11, 1985) is an American former professional baseball pitcher. He played in Major League Baseball (MLB) for the Los Angeles Angels of Anaheim.

== Early life and amateur career ==
Cassevah grew up in Pace, Florida where he was youth teammates with Josh Donaldson and P. J. Walters. Cassevah attended Pace High School where he was named all-state as a sophomore and junior. A football-related injury required him to undergo Tommy John surgery and miss his senior baseball season. He was highly regarded as a college baseball recruit and had verbally committed to play at Louisiana State on a full scholarship.

== Professional career ==
=== Los Angeles Angels of Anaheim ===
He was drafted in the 34th round of the 2004 amateur draft by the Anaheim Angels out of Pace High School.

Cassevah began his professional career in 2005 with the AZL Angels. With them, he went 2–5 with a 5.40 ERA in 15 games (4 starts). He pitched for the Orem Owlz in 2006, going 2–5 with a 6.80 ERA in 16 games (10 starts).

He became a reliever in 2007 and performed well, going 2–1 with a 2.75 ERA in 24 combined relief appearances for the Orem Owlz and Cedar Rapids Kernels. In 2008, he went 2–3 with a 3.79 ERA in 44 relief appearances for the Rancho Cucamonga Quakes. He went 3–7 with a 3.68 ERA in 57 relief appearances for the Arkansas Travelers in 2009.

=== Oakland Athletics ===
On December 10, 2009, the Athletics drafted him from the Angels in the Rule 5 draft.

=== Second stint with the Angels ===
On March 15, 2010, the Athletics offered Cassevah back to the Los Angeles Angels of Anaheim who accepted him back.

On June 13, 2011, Cassevah was recalled from AAA Salt Lake to replace the injured Fernando Rodney. He has pitched an impressive 2.72 ERA in 30 appearances in the 2011 season.

On February 28, 2013, Cassevah was outrighted by the Angels and removed from the 40-man roster. On March 1, 2013, he refused an outright assignment to AAA and became a free agent.

=== Colorado Rockies ===
On March 2, 2013, he signed a minor league contract with the Colorado Rockies. On March 23, 2014, the Rockies released Cassevah.

== Pitch types ==
Cassevah was mainly a sinkerballer (90–94), with a slider to righties and a changeup to lefties as off-speed pitches.

== See also ==
- Rule 5 draft results
