= Peter Bourjos =

American baseball player (born 1987)

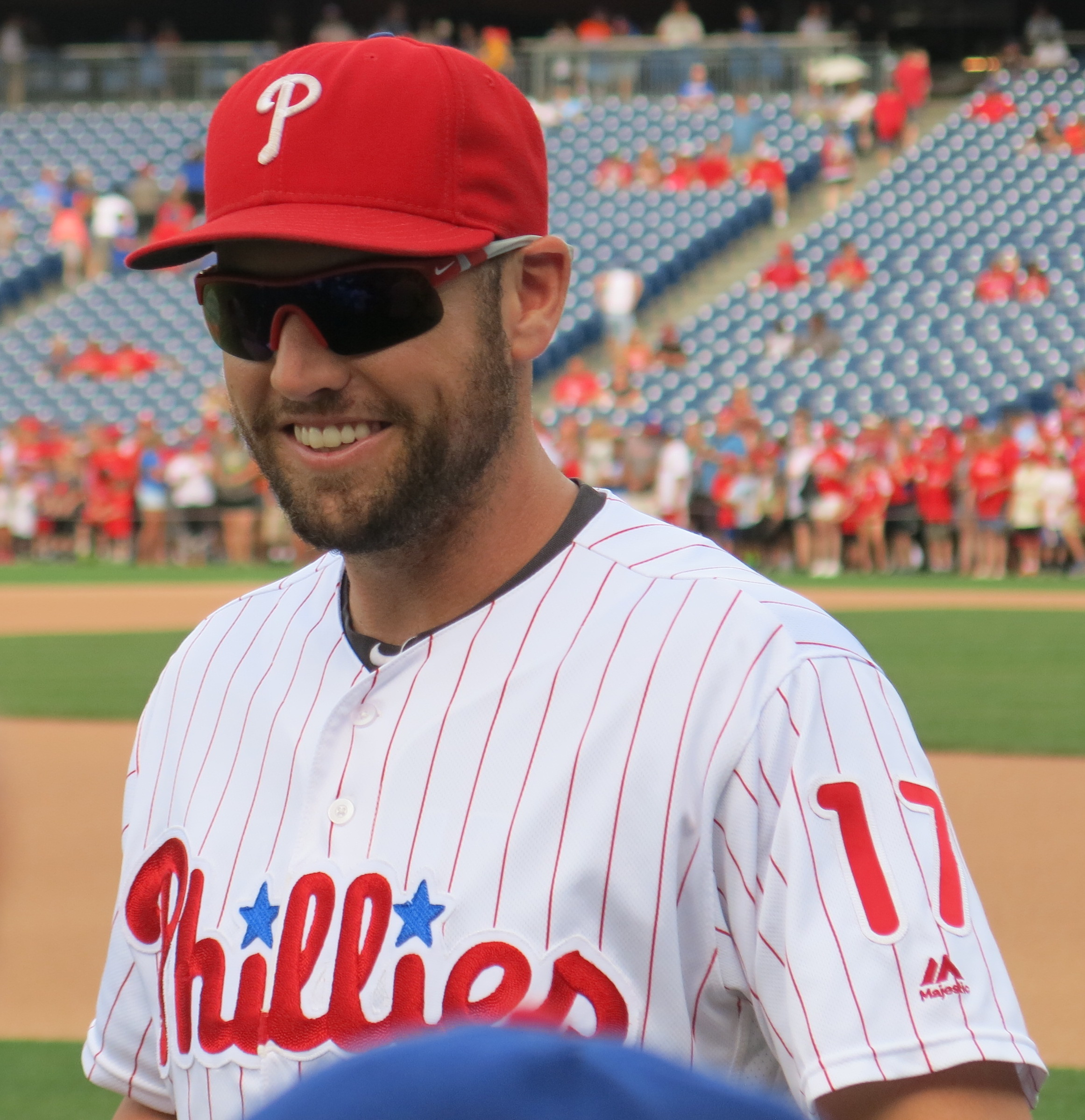
- Bourjos with the Phillies 2016
- Center fielder
- Born: March 31, 1987 (age 38); Park Ridge, Illinois, U.S.
- Batted: Right Threw: Right

MLB debut
- August 3, 2010, for the Los Angeles Angels of Anaheim

Last MLB appearance
- May 4, 2019, for the Los Angeles Angels

MLB statistics
- Batting average: .237
- Home runs: 43
- Runs batted in: 170
- Stats at Baseball Reference

Teams
- Los Angeles Angels of Anaheim (2010–2013); St. Louis Cardinals (2014–2015); Philadelphia Phillies (2016); Tampa Bay Rays (2017); Atlanta Braves (2018); Los Angeles Angels (2019)

Peter Christopher Bourjos (born March 31, 1987) is an American former professional baseball center fielder. He played in Major League Baseball (MLB) for the Los Angeles Angels of Anaheim / Los Angeles Angels, St. Louis Cardinals, Philadelphia Phillies, Tampa Bay Rays, and Atlanta Braves.

The Angels selected him in the tenth round of the 2005 amateur draft from Notre Dame Preparatory High School in Scottsdale, Arizona. He made his MLB debut for the Angels in 2010. The Cardinals obtained him in a trade with the Angels after the 2013 season. Bourjos has gained considerable attention for his defensive skills, including his range, speed and ability to make what are deemed difficult catches.

After bouncing around a variety of different clubs over the next six years (including the Philadelphia Phillies, Tampa Bay Rays, Atlanta Braves), Bourjos ended his career with the Angels before joining the Colorado Rockies front office as an advance scout.

== Career ==
Bourjos attended Desert Mountain High School for his freshman year and later transferred to Notre Dame Preparatory High School in Scottsdale, Arizona. He also played football at Notre Dame High as wide receiver and kickoff returner.

=== Los Angeles Angels of Anaheim ===
The Los Angeles Angels of Anaheim selected Bourjos in the 10th round of the 2005 Major League Baseball draft, signing him on August 18, 2005. In 2008, Bourjos registered 50 stolen bases (SB) and a .295 batting average (AVG) with the Rancho Cucamonga Quakes.

Bourjos spent 2009 with the Arkansas Travelers. In 110 games, he batted .281, scored 72 runs, hit 16 doubles, 14 triples, six home runs (HR) and drove in 51 runners (RBI). In 109 games in the outfield, he recorded 294 putouts, five double plays and seven assists in 302 total chances with only one error for a .997 fielding percentage. He led the Texas League (TL) in triples and led the Travelers in runs. In May, he was selected as the Angels' Defensive Player of the Month and as a TL All-Star. He was also recognized as the Angels minor league system's Defensive Player of the Year in 2009.

In the offseason after 2009, the Angels bought his contract and added him to their 40-man roster to prevent him from being selected by another team in the Rule 5 draft. Going into the 2010 season, Baseball America named him the second-best prospect in the Angels system, the "fastest baserunner", and "best defensive outfielder." Through the first three months of the 2010 season, he batted .314 with 12 triples and 27 stolen bases with the Salt Lake Bees. In 487 games and seven minor league seasons in the Angels system, Bourjos batted .291 with a .345 on-base percentage, .455 slugging percentage, 88 doubles, 54 triples, 41 HR, 225 RBI and 141 SB.

Bourjos made his Major League debut on August 3, 2010. In an August game against the Toronto Blue Jays, he nearly robbed Adam Lind of a triple when he ran so fast into the wall that the ball caromed off his forearm. That same game, he made a diving catch in shallow left-center field to rob Aaron Hill of a hit, caught Yunel Escobar's deep fly ball at the 400-foot mark on the wall in center field and took away a hit from José Bautista on a rocket line drive in the ninth. Bourjos appeared in 51 games that year, batting .204 with six doubles, four triples, six home runs and ten stolen bases. He played 450 innings in the outfield and recorded ten assists, which placed second among all American League (AL) center fielders.

In 2011, he, along with Austin Jackson, led the AL with 11 triples. It was an overall breakout season for Bourjos with a .271 batting average, 26 doubles, 12 homers, 49 extra base hits and 22 stolen bases in 147 games. He also registered seven assists, fifth among AL center fielders. The next season, he lost most of his playing time as heralded prospect Mike Trout emerged and the Angels continued playing Vernon Wells and Torii Hunter. His three-run, inside-the-park home run on April 11 erased a two-run deficit to the Minnesota Twins in the fifth inning on April 11, but the Angels were eventually defeated 6–5. It was the first such homer for an Angel since Gary Matthews, Jr., did so June 17, 2007 at Dodger Stadium. In September, Bourjos suffered wrist soreness in the aftermath of being hit by a pitch. He appeared in 101 games and totaled just 195 plate appearances. In 501 2/3 innings on defense, he made just one error for a .994 fielding percentage. The Halos won 64 of his 95 appearances (.674 winning percentage) in center field. His final batting line included a .220 batting average, .291 on-base percentage and .315 slugging percentage, three HR, seven doubles, and three stolen bases. After the season, Hunter signed with the Detroit Tigers as a free agent, clearing an opportunity for Bourjos regain regular playing time.

To increase his production at the plate, Bourjos began taking batting practice off a tee before the 2013 season. His strategy was to change his approach by hitting more ground balls and line drives, and fewer fly balls. In 2011, he had posted a ground ball rate of 46.8 percent. In 2013, he had raised that total to 58.7 percent, which was top-ten for hitters with at least 170 plate appearances. The extra practice and change in approach showed improved results. As of June 29, he had carried a .333 batting average, .392 on-base percentage and .457 slugging percentage and started to recoup a regular role. However, in August, Bourjos took another pitch off his wrist from Jordan Lyles of the Houston Astros. He attempted to rehabilitate it without surgery, but produced just five hits in 46 PA in August and September. Surgery was required to repair the wrist. His final 2013 batting line included a .274 AVG, .333 OBP, .374 SLG, three doubles, three triples and three home runs with six stolen bases in 55 total games and 196 PA.

=== St. Louis Cardinals ===
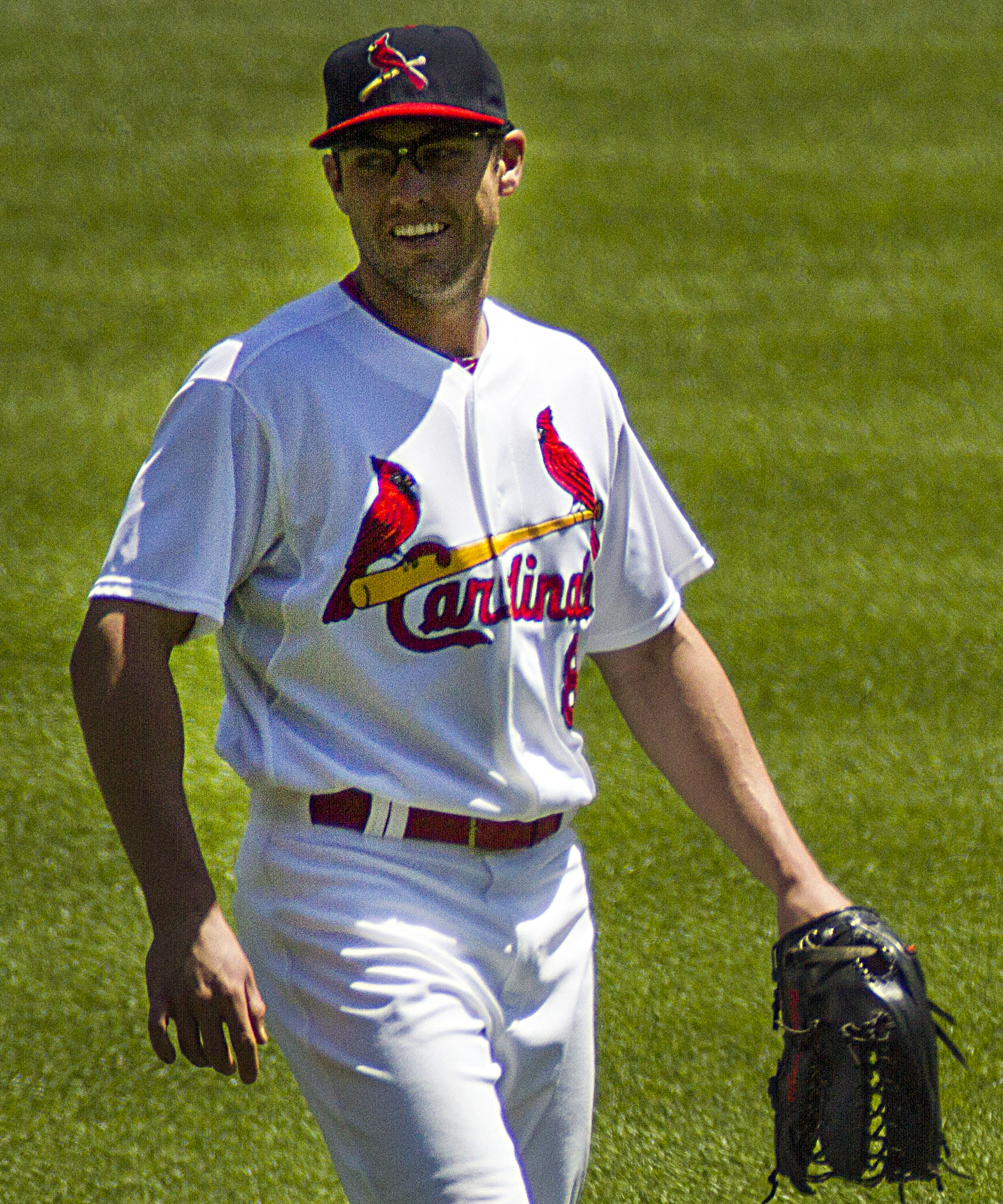
Bourjos while playing for the Cardinals

On November 22, 2013, the Angels traded Bourjos and Randal Grichuk to the St. Louis Cardinals for third baseman David Freese and relief pitcher Fernando Salas. With the previous season's starting center fielder Jon Jay producing a decline in offensive performance and below average defense, acquiring Bourjos allowed the Cardinals to offset some defensive inconsistency. On January 17, 2014, Bourjos and the Cardinals avoided arbitration by agreeing to a one-year, $1.2 million contract, with a plate appearance-based performance incentive worth $150,000.

Bourjos' first three-hit game for the Cardinals occurred on May 7, 2014, against the Atlanta Braves. He also hit his second home run of the season as the Cardinals prevailed, 7–1. During a May 29 game against the San Francisco Giants, he advanced from first base to third on pitcher Jaime García's sacrifice bunt. The Giants had optioned for an infield shift, leaving third base without a stationed fielder. The play also occurred without the benefit of an error. Bourjos' first home run at Busch Stadium gave the Cardinals the go-ahead run against the Kansas City Royals on June 4. Bourjos' fourth home run of the season came in the ninth inning against the Baltimore Orioles' Zach Britton on August 10, to opposite field over the right field scoreboard in Oriole Park at Camden Yards.

Playing in 119 games, Bourjos batted .231 with a .294 on base percentage in 2014. A slow start to the season caused him to lose playing time to Jay. Bourjos made his first career playoff appearance against the Los Angeles Dodgers in the National League Division Series (NLDS) and the Giants in the National League Championship Series (NLCS), playing in five games and batting twice. The Giants eliminated the Cardinals from postseason play. On October 21, 2014, Bourjos had surgery to repair hip impingement. He stated that it had affected his swing, contributing to lower offensive production, including his batting average.

Bourjos and the Cardinals avoided arbitration for the second consecutive season by agreeing to a one-year, $1.65 million contract, on January 15, 2015. He began the season as the fourth outfielder, with most of the playing time in center field going to Jay. His speed impacted both offense and defense in the April 29 win against the Philadelphia Phillies. He collected two hits, including an RBI triple, and covered long range to snare Chase Utley's fly ball at the warning track.

=== Philadelphia Phillies ===
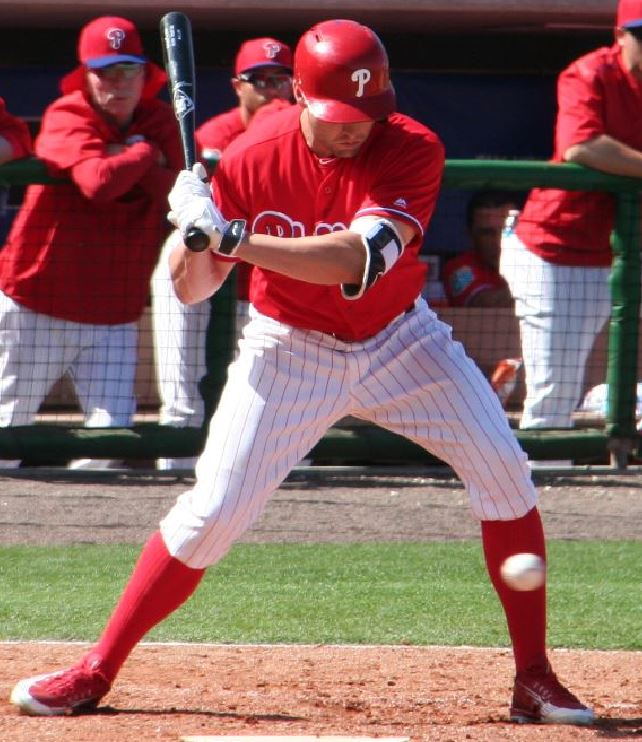
Bourjos with the Phillies in 2016 Spring Training

On December 2, 2015, the Philadelphia Phillies claimed Bourjos off of waivers. Bourjos spent the entire season with the Phillies, hitting .251/.292/.389 with 5 home runs and 23 RBIs.

=== Tampa Bay Rays ===
On January 27, 2017, Bourjos signed a minor league deal with the Chicago White Sox. On March 28, 2017, he was traded to the Tampa Bay Rays for cash considerations or a player to be named later. He played in 100 games for the Rays, hitting .223/.272/.383 with 5 home runs.

=== Chicago Cubs ===
On February 1, 2018, Bourjos signed a minor league contract with the Chicago Cubs. He was released on March 23.

=== Atlanta Braves ===
On March 26, 2018, the Atlanta Braves signed Bourjos to a one-year contract worth $1 million. He was designated for assignment on April 25, and later released on April 29. He resigned a minor league deal on May 1, 2018. He had his contract purchased for the second time on May 31, 2018. In 2018 with Atlanta he batted .205/.239/.364.

On July 2, 2018, Bourjos elected free agency after being designated for assignment and subsequently clearing waivers.

=== San Francisco Giants ===
On July 13, 2018, the San Francisco Giants signed Bourjos to a minor league deal. In 44 games for the Triple–A Sacramento River Cats, he batted .296/.335/.426 with two home runs and 14 RBI. Bourjos elected free agency following the season on November 2.

=== Second stint with Angels ===
On November 14, 2018, Bourjos signed a minor league deal with the Los Angeles Angels. Bourjos made the team in Spring Training and was selected to the Opening Day roster on March 27, 2019. Bourjos hit .091/.109/.114 in 26 games with the team before being designated for assignment on May 7. On May 10, 2019, Bourjos was released by the Angels.

== Post-playing career ==
On January 30, 2020, Bourjos was hired as an advance scout for the Colorado Rockies, effectively ending his playing career. On November 11, 2021, Bourjos was hired by the Arizona Diamondbacks to serve as the team's roving minor league outfield and baserunning coordinator.

== Skills profile ==
Bourjos was prized mainly for his speed and defense. According to Fangraphs in 2013, he "rate(d) as one of the very best defensive center fielders in baseball", and also noted his base running. Baseball Prospectus noted that he "covered so much ground as a center fielder that it sometimes backfired early in the season. His corner outfielders (Hunter and Wells), unaccustomed to flanking a player with such range, sometimes weren't giving way to Bourjos, while other times they flinched or back away at his mere approach." Even after Trout became a full-time player for the Angels in 2012, Bourjos exclusively played center field when he was in the game, pushing Trout into left field. Through 2013, center field was the only position Bourjos had played in 341 Major League games, aside from five as a designated hitter.

As a hitter, Bourjos was mainly a ground ball hitter, posting a 50.5% ground ball rate over his career as of 2013. In 2011, he posted his lowest career ground ball rate at 46.8%. Every other season, it has been above 50%. In 2013, it was 58.7%. According to former Cardinals pitching coach Dave Duncan's anecdotes, Bourjos' batted-ball style is one that allows little margin for extra base hits.

== Personal ==
Bourjos is the son of former San Francisco Giants outfielder Chris Bourjos, who played in the famous 33 inning minor league baseball game between the Pawtucket Red Sox and Rochester Red Wings in 1981. Bourjos and his wife, Ashley, have a son and a daughter.

== See also ==
- List of second-generation Major League Baseball players
