= David Carpenter (baseball, born 1987) =

American baseball player (born 1987)

- Pitcher
- Born: September 1, 1987 (age 39); Arlington, Texas, U.S.
- Batted: Right Threw: Right

MLB debut
- April 13, 2012, for the Los Angeles Angels of Anaheim

Last MLB appearance
- July 12, 2015, for the Atlanta Braves

MLB statistics
- Win–loss record: 1–2
- Earned run average: 5.23
- Strikeouts: 29
- Stats at Baseball Reference

Teams
- Los Angeles Angels of Anaheim (2012–2014); Atlanta Braves (2015)

David Lee Carpenter (born September 1, 1987) is an American former professional baseball pitcher. He has played for the Los Angeles Angels of Anaheim and Atlanta Braves.

== Professional career ==
Carpenter throws four pitches: a four-seam fastball and two-seam fastball 85–88 mph, a changeup and slider that average about 80 mph.

=== Los Angeles Angels of Anaheim ===
Carpenter was called up to the majors for the first time on April 13, 2012. He was outrighted off the Angels roster on September 22, 2013. He was called up on June 21, 2014 and designated for assignment on August 2. He was assigned outright to the Triple-A Salt Lake Bees on August 5. Carpenter elected free agency in October 2014.

=== Atlanta Braves ===
He signed with the Braves in January 2015 and He was called up on July 6 by the Braves. He became a free agent on October 6, 2016.
