= Andrew Taylor (baseball) =

American baseball player (born 1986)

- Pitcher
- Born: August 18, 1986 (age 40); Durham, North Carolina, U.S.
- Batted: Right Threw: Left

MLB debut
- September 27, 2012, for the Los Angeles Angels

Last appearance
- October 3, 2012, for the Los Angeles Angels

MLB statistics
- Win–loss record: 0–0
- Earned run average: 11.57
- Strikeouts: 0
- Stats at Baseball Reference

Teams
- Los Angeles Angels (2012)

Andrew Raymond Taylor (born August 18, 1986) is an American former professional baseball pitcher. He played in Major League Baseball (MLB) for the Los Angeles Angels.

== Early life ==
Taylor attended Wake Forest-Rolesville High School in Wake Forest, North Carolina. He played collegiate baseball at NC State.

== Professional career ==
=== Los Angeles Angels ===
Taylor was drafted by the Los Angeles Angels of Anaheim in the 34th round of the 2008 Major League Baseball draft out of North Carolina State University.

Taylor was called up to the major leagues for the first time on September 1, 2012. He made three appearances for Los Angeles during his rookie campaign, struggling to an 11.57 ERA with no strikeouts across 2 1/3 innings pitched. On October 8, Taylor was removed from the 40-man roster and sent outright to the Triple-A Salt Lake Bees. He was released by the Angels organization on March 12, 2014.

=== Independent Leagues ===
In 2014, Taylor played with the Rockland Boulders of the Can-Am League and won the Can-Am Championship with the team. In 2015, Taylor stayed in the Can-Am League for the Trois-Rivières Aigles and helped them win their first league championship. On March 2, 2016, Taylor signed with the independent Wichita Wingnuts of the American Association of Independent Professional Baseball. He has not played professionally since.
