= Nick Maronde =

American baseball player (born 1989)

- Pitcher
- Born: September 5, 1989 (age 37); Lexington, Kentucky, U.S.
- Batted: Switch Threw: Left

MLB debut
- September 2, 2012, for the Los Angeles Angels of Anaheim

Last MLB appearance
- May 7, 2014, for the Los Angeles Angels of Anaheim

MLB statistics
- Win–loss record: 0–0
- Earned run average: 7.13
- Strikeouts: 19
- Stats at Baseball Reference

Teams
- Los Angeles Angels of Anaheim (2012–2014)

John Nicholas Maronde (born September 5, 1989) is an American former professional baseball pitcher. He played in Major League Baseball (MLB) for the Los Angeles Angels of Anaheim.

== Career ==
=== Amateur ===
Maronde went to Lexington Catholic High School in Lexington, KY, where he won a state championship in his sophomore year. After his senior year in high school, he was drafted by the Oakland Athletics in the 43rd round (1294th overall) of the 2008 Major League Baseball draft, but he did not sign, opting instead to attend college. He attended the University of Florida, where he played for the Florida Gators baseball team. He appeared in two College World Series, and in his junior season, his team lost in the final game. In 2010, he played collegiate summer baseball with the Falmouth Commodores of the Cape Cod Baseball League.

=== Los Angeles Angels ===
Maronde was drafted by the Los Angeles Angels of Anaheim in the 3rd round (104th overall) of the 2011 Major League Baseball draft after his junior season, and he elected to forgo his senior season. He was playing in Double-A for the Arkansas Travelers in the Angels' minor league system before being called up to the Major Leagues on September 1, 2012.

Maronde made his major league debut on September 2, 2012, against the Seattle Mariners. He faced only one batter and had his first major league strikeout on three pitches. Three days later against the Oakland Athletics, he struck out all three batters that he faced in an inning pitched. Maronde made 12 appearances for Los Angeles during his rookie campaign, recording a 1.50 ERA with seven strikeouts over six innings of work.

Maronde started the 2013 season back with Double-A Arkansas, and was recalled by the Angels on July 29, 2013. He made 10 relief outings for the team, but struggled to a 6.75 ERA with five strikeouts across 5 1/3 innings pitched.

Maronde made 11 appearances for Los Angeles during the 2014 season, struggling to a 12.79 ERA with seven strikeouts across 6 1/3 innings pitched. Maronde was designated for assignment by the Angels following the promotion of Drew Rucinski on July 10, 2014.

=== Cleveland Indians ===
On July 12, 2014, the Angels traded Maronde to the Cleveland Indians in exchange for cash considerations. He made six appearances split between the Low-A Mahoning Valley Scrappers, Double-A Akron RubberDucks, and Triple-A Columbus Clippers. On December 16, Maronde was designated for assignment by the Indians following the signing of Gavin Floyd. He cleared waivers and was sent outright to Triple-A Columbus on December 23.

Maronde split the 2015 season between Akron and Columbus, accumulating an 0–9 record and 4.70 ERA with 93 strikeouts in 92 innings pitched across 35 games (11 starts). He made 38 appearances (two starts) for the two affiliates during the 2016 season, compiling an aggregate 0–1 record and 3.19 ERA with 39 strikeouts and four saves over 48 innings of work.

=== Miami Marlins ===
On December 8, 2016, at the Winter Meetings, the Miami Marlins selected Maronde from the Indians in the minor league phase of the Rule 5 draft. He was released by Miami prior to the start of the season on March 29, 2017.

== See also ==
- Rule 5 draft results
