= 2014 Los Angeles Angels season =

Major League Baseball season

2014 Los Angeles Angels
- American League West champions
- League: American League
- Division: West
- Ballpark: Angel Stadium
- City: Anaheim, California
- Record: 98–64 (.605)
- Divisional place: 1st
- Owner: Arte Moreno
- General manager: Jerry Dipoto
- Manager: Mike Scioscia (14th season)
- Television: FSN West; KCOP (My 13) (Victor Rojas, Mark Gubicza, Amaury Pi-González, José Mota)
- Radio: KLAA (AM 830) KSPN (AM 710) (Terry Smith, José Mota) Spanish: KWKW (AM 1330) (Rolando Nichols)
- Stats: ESPN.com; Baseball Reference

The 2014 Los Angeles Angels season was the franchise's 54th season and 49th in Anaheim (all of them at Angel Stadium).

The Angels achieved a historically significant milestone during the course of the season by improving their all-time winning percentage to above the .500 mark. The Angels won their 89th game of the season on September 9 to ensure that they would become the first post-1960 expansion team to finish a season with an all-time winning record since the Houston Astros at the conclusion of the 2006 MLB season.

The Angels finished the season with the best record in all of Major League Baseball, but they were swept by the Kansas City Royals in the ALDS. After two consecutive 2nd place finishes, Mike Trout won the first of three AL Most Valuable Player awards.

As of 2026, this is the last time the Angels have made the postseason.

== Standings ==
=== Season standings ===
==== American League West ====
AL West
Team	W	L	Pct.	GB	Home	Road
Los Angeles Angels	98	64	.605	—	52‍–‍29	46‍–‍35
Oakland Athletics	88	74	.543	10	48‍–‍33	40‍–‍41
Seattle Mariners	87	75	.537	11	41‍–‍40	46‍–‍35
Houston Astros	70	92	.432	28	38‍–‍43	32‍–‍49
Texas Rangers	67	95	.414	31	33‍–‍48	34‍–‍47

==== American League division leaders ====
Division leaders
Team	W	L	Pct.
Los Angeles Angels	98	64	.605
Baltimore Orioles	96	66	.593
Detroit Tigers	90	72	.556

Wild Card teams (Top 2 teams qualify for postseason)
Team	W	L	Pct.	GB
Kansas City Royals	89	73	.549	+1
Oakland Athletics	88	74	.543	—
Seattle Mariners	87	75	.537	1
Cleveland Indians	85	77	.525	3
New York Yankees	84	78	.519	4
Toronto Blue Jays	83	79	.512	5
Tampa Bay Rays	77	85	.475	11
Chicago White Sox	73	89	.451	15
Boston Red Sox	71	91	.438	17
Houston Astros	70	92	.432	18
Minnesota Twins	70	92	.432	18
Texas Rangers	67	95	.414	21

=== Record vs. opponents ===
2014 American League record Source: MLB Standings Grid – 2014
Team	BAL	BOS	CWS	CLE	DET	HOU	KC	LAA	MIN	NYY	OAK	SEA	TB	TEX	TOR	NL
Baltimore	—	11–8	5–1	3–4	1–5	4–3	3–4	4–2	4–3	13–6	2–4	5–2	12–7	6–1	11–8	12–8
Boston	8–11	—	4–3	2–5	1–5	4–3	6–1	2–5	4–2	7–12	3–4	1–5	9–10	4–2	7–12	9–11
Chicago	1–5	3–4	—	9–10	9–10	3–3	6–13	1–5	9–10	2–5	4–3	3–4	5–2	2–4	5–2	11–9
Cleveland	4–3	5–2	10–9	—	8–11	5–2	10–9	2–5	11–8	4–3	2–4	2–4	4–2	6–1	2–4	10–10
Detroit	5–1	5–1	10–9	11–8	—	4–3	13–6	3–4	9–10	3–4	5–2	2–4	3–4	4–3	1–5	12–8
Houston	3–4	3–4	3–3	2–5	3–4	—	3–3	7–12	3–3	4–2	8–11	9–10	2–5	11–8	4–3	5–15
Kansas City	4–3	1–6	13–6	9–10	6–13	3–3	—	3–3	11–8	4–3	5–2	2–5	4–2	5–1	4–3	15–5
Los Angeles	2–4	5–2	5–1	5–2	4–3	12–7	3–3	—	7–0	2–4	10–9	7–12	5–2	14–5	5–2	12–8
Minnesota	3–4	2–4	10–9	8–11	10–9	3–3	8–11	0–7	—	3–4	1–6	5–2	2–4	2–5	4–2	9–11
New York	6–13	12–7	5–2	3–4	4–3	2–4	3–4	4–2	4–3	—	2–4	3–3	8–11	4–3	11–8	13–7
Oakland	4–2	4–3	3–4	4–2	2–5	11–8	2–5	9–10	6–1	4–2	—	9–10	4–2	9–10	4–3	13–7
Seattle	2–5	5–1	4–3	4–2	4–2	10–9	5–2	12–7	2–5	3–3	10–9	—	4–3	9–10	4–3	9–11
Tampa Bay	7–12	10–9	2–5	2–4	4–3	5–2	2–4	2–5	4–2	11–8	2–4	3–4	—	5–2	8–11	10–10
Texas	1–6	2–4	4–2	1–6	3–4	8–11	1–5	5–14	5–2	3–4	10–9	10–9	2–5	—	2–4	10–10
Toronto	8–11	12–7	2–5	4–2	5–1	3–4	3–4	2–5	2–4	8–11	3–4	3–4	11–8	4–2	—	13–7

== Game log ==
2014 Game Log (98–64)
March: 0–1 (Home: 0–1; Away: 0–0 )

#	Date	Opponent	Score	Win	Loss	Save	Attendance	Record
1	March 31	Mariners	3–10	Hernández (1–0)	**Weaver** (0–1)		44,152	0–1

April: 14–12 (Home: 6–5; Away: 8–7 )

#	Date	Opponent	Score	Win	Loss	Save	Attendance	Record
2	April 1	Mariners	3–8	Ramírez (1–0)	**Wilson** (0–1)		43,567	0–2
3	April 2	Mariners	2–8	Paxton (1–0)	**Santiago** (0–1)		38,007	0–3
4	April 4	@ Astros	11–1	**Richards** (1–0)	Harrell (0–1)		15,611	1–3
5	April 5	@ Astros	5–1	**Skaggs** (1–0)	Keuchel (0–1)		28,515	2–3
6	April 6	@ Astros	4–7	Feldman (2–0)	**Weaver** (0–2)	Qualls (1)	14,786	2–4
7	April 7	@ Astros	9–1	**Wilson** (1–1)	Cosart (1–1)		17,936	3–4
8	April 8	@ Mariners	3–5	Paxton (2–0)	**Santiago** (0–2)	Rodney (2)	45,661	3–5
9	April 9	@ Mariners	2–0	**Richards** (2–0)	Elías (0–1)	**Frieri** (1)	16,437	4–5
10	April 11	Mets	5–4 (11)	**Kohn** (1–0)	Familia (0–2)		42,871	5–5
11	April 12	Mets	6–7 (13)	Lannan (1–0)	**Shoemaker** (0–1)		40,027	5–6
12	April 13	Mets	14–2	**Wilson** (2–1)	Colón (1–2)		38,855	6–6
13	April 14	Athletics	2–3	Johnson (1–2)	**Frieri** (0–1)	Gregerson (2)	37,120	6–7
14	April 15	Athletics	9–10 (11)	Johnson (2–2)	**Herrera** (0–1)		34,887	6–8
15	April 16	Athletics	5–4 (12)	**Smith** (1–0)	Pomeranz (1–1)		37,344	7–8
16	April 18	@ Tigers	11–6	**Weaver** (1–2)	Smyly (1–1)		28,435	8–8
17	April 19	@ Tigers	2–5	Scherzer (1–1)	**Wilson** (2–2)		36,659	8–9
18	April 20	@ Tigers	1–2	Porcello (2–1)	**Santiago** (0–3)	Nathan (3)	28,921	8–10
19	April 21	@ Nationals	4–2	**Salas** (1–0)	Clippard (1–2)	**Frieri** (2)	24,371	9–10
20	April 22	@ Nationals	7–2	**Skaggs** (2–0)	Jordan (0–3)		21,915	10–10
21	April 23	@ Nationals	4–5	Storen (2–0)	**Frieri** (0–2)		22,504	10–11
22	April 25	@ Yankees	13–1	**Wilson** (3–2)	Kuroda (2–2)		38,358	11–11
23	April 26	@ Yankees	3–4	Betances (1–0)	**Santiago** (0–4)	Robertson (3)	40,908	11–12
24	April 27	@ Yankees	2–3	Warren (1–1)	**Kohn** (1–1)	Robertson (4)	40,028	11–13
25	April 28	Indians	6–3	**Salas** (2–0)	Masterson (0–1)	**Smith** (1)	37,654	12–13
26	April 29	Indians	6–4	**Weaver** (2–2)	Kluber (2–3)	**Smith** (2)	35,131	13–13
27	April 30	Indians	7–1	**Wilson** (4–2)	McAllister (3–2)		33,334	14–13

May: 16–12 (Home: 9–7; Away: 7–5 )

#	Date	Opponent	Score	Win	Loss	Save	Attendance	Record
28	May 2	Rangers	2–5	Lewis (2–1)	**Santiago** (0–5)	Soria (7)	42,989	14–14
29	May 3	Rangers	5–3	**Richards** (3–0)	Tolleson (0–1)	**Smith** (3)	39,107	15–14
30	May 4	Rangers	3–14	Darvish (2–1)	**Skaggs** (2–1)		37,765	15–15
31	May 5	Yankees	4–1	**Weaver** (3–2)	Kelley (0–2)	**Frieri** (3)	39,701	16–15
32	May 6	Yankees	3–4	Kelley (1–2)	**Frieri** (0–3)	Robertson (5)	41,106	16–16
33	May 7	Yankees	2–9	Nuño (1–0)	**Santiago** (0–6)		44,083	16–17
34	May 9	@ Blue Jays	4–3	**Smith** (2–0)	Cecil (0–3)	**Frieri** (4)	21,383	17–17
35	May 10	@ Blue Jays	5–3	**Skaggs** (3–1)	Happ (1–1)	**Smith** (4)	31,412	18–17
36	May 11	@ Blue Jays	9–3	**Weaver** (4–2)	Hutchison (1–3)		20,871	19–17
37	May 12	@ Blue Jays	3–7	Buehrle (7–1)	**Wilson** (4–3)	Delabar (8)	13,603	19–18
38	May 13	@ Phillies	4–3	**Shoemaker** (1–1)	Lee (3–4)	**Frieri** (5)	41,959	20–18
39	May 14	@ Phillies	3–0	**Richards** (4–0)	Burnett (2–3)	**Smith** (5)	33,308	21–18
40	May 15	Rays	6–5	**Salas** (3–0)	Boxberger (0–1)		34,441	22–18
41	May 16	Rays	0–3	Archer (3–2)	**Weaver** (4–3)	Balfour (8)	38,796	22–19
42	May 17	Rays	6–0	**Wilson** (5–3)	Ramos (1–3)		42,224	23–19
43	May 18	Rays	6–2	**Shoemaker** (2–1)	Price (4–4)		36,655	24–19
44	May 19	Astros	2–5	Keuchel (5–2)	**Richards** (4–1)		33,150	24–20
45	May 20	Astros	9–3	**Skaggs** (4–1)	Feldman (2–2)		30,150	25–20
46	May 21	Astros	2–1	**Weaver** (5–3)	McHugh (2–3)		40,112	26–20
47	May 23	Royals	6–1	**Wilson** (6–3)	Duffy (2–4)		35,082	27–20
48	May 24	Royals	4–7 (13)	Crow (2–1)	**Morin** (0–1)	Holland (14)	42,140	27–21
49	May 25	Royals	4–3	**Kohn** (2–1)	Collins (0–3)	**Frieri** (6)	36,114	28–21
50	May 26	@ Mariners	1–5	Young (4–2)	**Skaggs** (4–2)		22,710	28–22
51	May 27	@ Mariners	6–4	**Weaver** (6–3)	Elías (3–4)	**Frieri** (7)	13,064	29–22
52	May 28	@ Mariners	1–3	Hernández (7–1)	**Wilson** (6–4)	Rodney (13)	13,895	29–23
53	May 29	@ Mariners	7-5	**Shoemaker** (3-1)	Maurer (1-4)	**Frieri** (8)	11,657	30-23
54	May 30	@ Athletics	5–9	Pomeranz (5–2)	**Richards** (4–2)		23,384	30–24
55	May 31	@ Athletics	3–11	Rodriguez (1–0)	**Skaggs** (4–3)		35,067	30–25

June: 15–10 (Home: 11–1; Away: 4–9 )

#	Date	Opponent	Score	Win	Loss	Save	Attendance	Record
56	June 1	@ Athletics	3–6	Gray (6–1)	**Weaver** (6–4)	Doolittle (5)	32,231	30–26
57	June 3	@ Astros	2–7	McHugh (4–3)	**Wilson** (6–5)		23,219	30–27
58	June 4	@ Astros	4–0	**Richards** (5–2)	Cosart (4–5)		23,902	31–27
59	June 5	@ Astros	5–8	Peacock (2–4)	**Skaggs** (4–4)	Qualls (6)	24,672	31–28
60	June 6	White Sox	8–4	**Weaver** (7–4)	Rienzo (4–3)		38,521	32–28
61	June 7	White Sox	6–5	**Rasmus** (1–0)	Petricka (0–1)	**Frieri** (9)	39,089	33–28
62	June 8	White Sox	4–2	**Wilson** (7–5)	Quintana (3–6)	**Frieri** (10)	35,793	34–28
63	June 9	Athletics	4–1	**Richards** (6–2)	Chavez (5–4)	**Frieri** (11)	36838	35–28
64	June 10	Athletics	2–1 (14)	**Rasmus** (2–0)	Francis (0–2)		31,942	36–28
65	June 11	Athletics	1–7	Milone (4–3)	**Weaver** (7–5)		36,793	36–29
66	June 13	@ Braves	3–4	Harang (5–5)	**Wilson** (7–6)	Kimbrel (19)	39,699	36–30
67	June 14	@ Braves	11–6 (13)	**Salas** (4–0)	Hale (2–1)		48,559	37–30
68	June 15	@ Braves	3–7	Varvaro (2–1)	**Santiago** (0–7)	Kimbrel (20)	29,320	37–31
69	June 16	@ Indians	3–4	Bauer (2–3)	**Weaver** (7–6)	Carrasco (1)	14,716	37–32
70	June 17	@ Indians	9–3	**Shoemaker** (4–1)	Tomlin (4–4)		14,639	38–32
	June 18	@ Indians	Postponed (rain). Makeup: September 8					
71	June 19	@ Indians	3–5	Crockett (1–0)	**Bedrosian** (0–1)		20,361	38–33
72	June 20	Rangers	7–3	**Richards** (7–2)	Saunders (0–3)		41,637	39–33
73	June 21	Rangers	3–2 (10)	**Morin** (1–1)	Cotts (2–4)		37,026	40–33
74	June 22	Rangers	5–2	**Shoemaker** (5–1)	Darvish (7–4)		37,191	41–33
75	June 24	Twins	8–6	**Wilson** (8–6)	Gibson (6–6)	**Smith** (6)	37,086	42–33
76	June 25	Twins	6–2	**Richards** (8–2)	Pino (0–1)		39,082	43–33
77	June 26	Twins	6–4	**Weaver** (8–6)	Nolasco (4–6)	**Smith** (7)	32,209	44–33
78	June 27	@ Royals	6–8	Mariot (1–0)	**Shoemaker** (5–2)	Holland (23)	35,461	44–34
79	June 28	@ Royals	6–2	**Morin** (2–1)	Ventura (5–7)		21,093	45–34
80	June 29	@ Royals	4–5	Holland (1–2)	**Grilli** (0–3)		27,803	45–35
	June 30	@ White Sox	Postponed (rain). Makeup: July 1					

July: 19–8 (Home: 12–5; Away: 7–3 )

#	Date	Opponent	Score	Win	Loss	Save	Attendance	Record
81	July 1	@ White Sox	8–4	**Richards** (9–2)	Noesí (2–6)	**Smith** (8)	20,233	46–35
82	July 1	@ White Sox	7–5	**Weaver** (9–6)	Carroll (2–5)	**Smith** (9)	20,233	47–35
83	July 2	@ White Sox	2–3	Putnam (3–1)	**Morin** (2–2)		18,207	47–36
84	July 3	Astros	5–2	**Shoemaker** (6–2)	Oberholtzer (2–7)	**Smith** (10)	37,625	48–36
85	July 4	Astros	7–6	**Smith** (3–0)	Sipp (1–1)		43,557	49–36
86	July 5	Astros	11–5	**Roth** (1–0)	Bass (1–1)		40,479	50–36
87	July 6	Astros	6–1	**Richards** (10–2)	McHugh (4–8)		33,552	51–36
88	July 7	Blue Jays	5–2	**Shoemaker** (7–2)	Happ (7–5)	**Smith** (11)	38,189	52–36
89	July 8	Blue Jays	0–4	Dickey (7–8)	**Skaggs** (4–5)		38,111	52–37
90	July 9	Blue Jays	8–7	**Grilli** (1–3)	Loup (2–2)	**Smith** (12)	35,726	53–37
91	July 10	@ Rangers	15–6	**Santiago** (1–7)	Lewis (6–6)		30,686	54–37
92	July 11	@ Rangers	3–0	**Richards** (11–2)	Tepesch (3–5)	**Smith** (13)	38,402	55–37
93	July 12	@ Rangers	5–2	**Weaver** (10–6)	Mikolas (0–2)	**Smith** (14)	37,253	56–37
94	July 13	@ Rangers	10–7	**Skaggs** (5–5)	Baker (0–3)	**Smith** (15)	34,750	57–37
**All–Star Break (July 14–17) AL wins 5–3**
95	July 18	Mariners	3–2 (16)	**Santiago** (2–7)	Leone (2–2)		42,517	58–37
96	July 19	Mariners	2–3 (12)	Leone (3–2)	**Thatcher** (0–1)	Furbush (1)	40,231	58–38
97	July 20	Mariners	6–5	**Thatcher** (1–1)	Rodney (1–4)		37,128	59–38
98	July 21	Orioles	2–4	Norris (8–6)	**Shoemaker** (7–3)	Britton (17)	39,028	59–39
99	July 22	Orioles	2–4	González (5–5)	**Morin** (2–3)	Britton (18)	35,353	59–40
100	July 23	Orioles	3–2	**Weaver** (11–6)	Hunter (2–2)	**Street** (25)	40,185	60–40
101	July 24	Tigers	4–6	Scherzer (12–3)	**Richards** (11–3)	Nathan (21)	40,146	60–41
102	July 25	Tigers	2–1	**Morin** (3–3)	Smyly (6–9)	**Street** (26)	42,915	61–41
103	July 26	Tigers	4–0	**Shoemaker** (8–3)	Verlander (9–9)		43,569	62–41
104	July 27	Tigers	2–1	**Smith** (4–0)	Chamberlain (1–4)	**Street** (27)	36,252	63–41
105	July 29	@ Orioles	6–7 (12)	Webb (3–1)	**Rasmus** (2–1)		36,882	63–42
106	July 30	@ Orioles	3–4	Gausman (5–3)	**Richards** (11–4)	Britton (21)	27,195	63–43
107	July 31	@ Orioles	1–0 (13)	**Santiago** (3–7)	Webb (3–2)	**Street** (28)	24,974	64–43

August: 19–10 (Home: 9–5; Away: 10–5 )

#	Date	Opponent	Score	Win	Loss	Save	Attendance	Record
108	August 1	@ Rays	5–3	**Shoemaker** (9–3)	Hellickson (0–1)	**Street** (29)	20,969	65–43
109	August 2	@ Rays	3–10	Archer (7–6)	**Wilson** (8–7)		26,656	65–44
110	August 3	@ Rays	7–5	**Weaver** (12–6)	Odorizzi (7–9)	**Street** (30)	25,877	66–44
111	August 4	@ Dodgers	5–0	**Richards** (12–4)	Greinke (12–7)		53,166	67–44
112	August 5	@ Dodgers	4–5	Jansen (2–3)	**Jepsen** (0–1)		53,051	67–45
113	August 6	Dodgers	1–2	Haren (9–9)	**Shoemaker** (9–4)	Jansen (32)	43,669	67–46
114	August 7	Dodgers	0–7	Ryu (13–5)	**Wilson** (8–8)		44,561	67–47
115	August 8	Red Sox	2–4	Webster (2–1)	**Weaver** (12–7)	Uehara (24)	38,016	67–48
116	August 9	Red Sox	5–4 (19)	**Shoemaker** (10–4)	Workman (1–6)		42,159	68–48
117	August 10	Red Sox	1–3	De La Rosa (4–4)	**Smith** (4–1)	Uehara (25)	36,300	68–49
118	August 12	Phillies	7–2	**Wilson** (9–8)	Bastardo (5–6)		37,296	69–49
119	August 13	Phillies	4–3	**Weaver** (13–7)	Burnett (6–13)	**Street** (31)	38,802	70–49
120	August 15	@ Rangers	5–4	**Richards** (13–4)	Martinez (2–9)	**Street** (32)	31,485	71–49
121	August 16	@ Rangers	5–4	**Shoemaker** (11–4)	Lewis (8–10)	**Street** (33)	32,209	72–49
122	August 17	@ Rangers	2–3	Feliz (1–1)	**Street** (1–1)		28,942	72–50
123	August 18	@ Red Sox	4–2	**Wilson** (10–8)	Workman (1–7)	**Jepsen** (1)	35,170	73–50
124	August 19	@ Red Sox	4–3	**Smith** (5–1)	Uehara (5–3)	**Street** (34)	35,471	74–50
125	August 20	@ Red Sox	8–3	**Rasmus** (3–1)	Buchholz (5–8)		35,136	75–50
126	August 21	@ Red Sox	2–0	**Shoemaker** (12–4)	De La Rosa (4–5)	**Grilli** (12)	36,160	76–50
127	August 22	@ Athletics	3–5	Gray (13–7)	**Grilli** (1–4)	Doolittle (19)	33,810	76–51
128	August 23	@ Athletics	1–2	Gregerson (3–2)	**Smith** (5–2)	Doolittle (20)	36,067	76–52
129	August 24	@ Athletics	9–4	**Weaver** (14–7)	Kazmir (14–6)		36,067	77–52
130	August 25	Marlins	1–7	Cosart (11–8)	**LeBlanc** (0–1)		35,350	77–53
131	August 26	Marlins	8–2	**Shoemaker** (13–4)	Eovaldi (6–9)		33,028	78–53
132	August 27	Marlins	6–1	**Santiago** (4–7)	Álvarez (10–6)		34,657	79–53
133	August 28	Athletics	4–3 (10)	**Salas** (5–0)	Cook (1–2)		41,056	80–53
134	August 29	Athletics	4–0	**Weaver** (15–7)	Lester (13–9)		41,177	81–53
135	August 30	Athletics	2–0	**Herrera** (1–1)	Samardzija (6–11)	**Street** (35)	44,018	82–53
136	August 31	Athletics	8–1	**Shoemaker** (14–4)	Kazmir (14–7)		44,205	83–53

September: 15–11 (Home: 5–5; Away: 10–6 )

#	Date	Opponent	Score	Win	Loss	Save	Attendance	Record
137	September 2	@ Astros	3–8	Peacock (4–8)	**Wilson** (10–9)		16,131	83–54
138	September 3	@ Astros	1–4	McHugh (8–9)	**Weaver** (15–8)	Qualls (17)	16,949	83–55
139	September 4	@ Twins	5–4	**Smith** (6–2)	Perkins (3–2)	**Street** (36)	21,914	84–55
140	September 5	@ Twins	7–6 (10)	**Street** (2–1)	Burton (2–4)	**Jepsen** (2)	23,477	85–55
141	September 6	@ Twins	8–5	**Smith** (7–2)	Burton (2–5)	**Street** (37)	28,924	86–55
142	September 7	@ Twins	14–4	**Wilson** (11–9)	Darnell (0–2)		25,419	87–55
143	September 8	@ Indians	12-3	**Weaver** (16–8)	Salazar (6–7)		15,116	88-55
144	September 9	@ Rangers	9–3	**Santiago** (5–7)	Lewis (9–13)		26,054	89–55
145	September 10	@ Rangers	8–1	**Shoemaker** (15–4)	Tepesch (4–10)		26,611	90–55
146	September 11	@ Rangers	7–3	**Morin** (4–3)	Martinez (3–11)		27,129	91–55
147	September 12	Astros	11–3	**Wilson** (12–9)	Oberholtzer (5–11)		33,339	92–55
148	September 13	Astros	5–2	**Weaver** (17–8)	Feldman (8–11)	**Street** (38)	38,041	93–55
149	September 14	Astros	1–6	Keuchel (11-9)	**Santiago** (5-8)		35,364	93–56
150	September 15	Mariners	8–1	**Shoemaker** (16-4)	Iwakuma (14-8)		36,137	94–56
151	September 16	Mariners	2–13	Smith (1–0)	**Grilli** (1–5)		36,193	94–57
152	September 17	Mariners	5–0	**Wilson** (13–9)	Paxton (6–3)		36,875	95–57
153	September 18	Mariners	1–3	Wilhelmsen (3–2)	**Jepsen** (0–2)	Rodney (46)	40,835	95–58
154	September 19	Rangers	3–12	Bonilla (2–0)	**Santiago** (5–9)		38,467	95–59
155	September 20	Rangers	8–5	**Weaver** (18–8)	Lewis (10–14)	**Street** (39)	35,890	96–59
156	September 21	Rangers	1–2	Tolleson (3-1)	**Street** (1-2)	Feliz (11)	27,166	96–60
157	September 22	@ Athletics	4–8	Samardzija (5-5)	**Wilson** (13-10)		25,455	96–61
158	September 23	@ Athletics	2–0	**LeBlanc** (1-1)	Gray (13-10)	**Street** (40)	27,588	97–61
159	September 24	@ Athletics	5–4	**Santiago** (6-9)	Lester (16-11)	**Street** (41)	27,989	98–61
160	September 26	@ Mariners	3–4	Iwakuma (15-9)	**Weaver** (18-9)	Rodney (48)	26,865	98–62
161	September 27	@ Mariners	1–2 (11)	Leone (8-2)	**Morin** (4-4)		32,716	98–63
162	September 28	@ Mariners	1–4	Hernández (15-6)	Rasmus (3-2)		40,823	98–64

Legend: = Win = Loss = Postponement
Bold = Angels team member

== Player stats ==
=== Batting ===
Note: G = Games played; AB = At bats; R = Runs; H = Hits; 2B = Doubles; 3B = Triples; HR = Home runs; RBI = Runs batted in; SB = Stolen bases; BB = Walks; AVG = Batting average; SLG = Slugging average

Player	G	AB	R	H	2B	3B	HR	RBI	SB	BB	AVG	SLG
Albert Pujols	159	633	89	172	37	1	28	105	5	48	.272	.466
Howie Kendrick	157	617	85	181	33	5	7	75	14	48	.293	.397
Mike Trout	157	602	115	173	39	9	36	111	16	83	.287	.561
Erick Aybar	156	589	77	164	30	4	7	68	16	36	.278	.379
Kole Calhoun	127	493	90	134	31	3	17	58	5	38	.272	.450
David Freese	134	462	53	120	25	1	10	55	1	38	.260	.383
Josh Hamilton	89	338	43	89	21	0	10	44	3	32	.263	.414
Chris Iannetta	108	306	41	77	22	0	7	43	3	54	.252	.392
Collin Cowgill	106	260	37	65	10	1	5	21	4	26	.250	.354
C.J. Cron	79	242	28	62	12	1	11	37	0	10	.256	.450
Hank Conger	80	231	24	51	12	0	4	25	0	22	.221	.325
Raúl Ibañez	57	166	16	26	5	2	3	21	3	23	.157	.265
Efrén Navarro	64	159	17	39	10	1	1	14	1	13	.245	.340
Grant Green	43	99	7	27	5	0	1	11	1	2	.273	.354
JB Shuck	22	84	10	14	1	0	2	9	2	3	.167	.250
John McDonald	95	76	4	13	2	0	0	5	1	7	.171	.197
Brennan Boesch	27	75	6	14	2	0	2	7	3	2	.187	.293
Ian Stewart	24	68	8	12	2	3	2	7	1	3	.176	.382
Gordon Beckham	26	56	10	15	3	0	2	8	0	3	.268	.429
Luis Jiménez	18	37	3	6	2	0	0	2	0	0	.162	.216
Shawn O'Malley	11	16	3	3	0	0	0	1	2	0	.188	.188
Tony Campana	18	15	6	5	0	0	0	2	0	0	.333	.333
John Buck	5	5	0	1	0	0	0	0	0	0	.200	.200
Pitcher totals	162	23	1	1	0	0	0	0	0	1	.043	.043
Team totals	162	5652	773	1464	304	31	155	729	81	492	.259	.406

=== Pitching ===
Note: W = Wins; L = Losses; ERA = Earned run average; G = Games pitched; GS = Games started; SV = Saves; IP = Innings pitched; H = Hits allowed; R = Runs allowed; ER = Earned runs; BB = Walks allowed; SO = Strikeouts

Player	W	L	ERA	G	GS	SV	IP	H	R	ER	BB	SO
Jered Weaver	18	9	3.59	34	34	0	213.1	193	87	85	65	169
C.J. Wilson	13	10	4.51	31	31	0	175.2	169	95	88	85	151
Garrett Richards	13	4	2.61	26	26	0	168.2	124	51	49	51	164
Matt Shoemaker	16	4	3.04	27	20	0	136.0	122	49	46	24	124
Hector Santiago	6	9	3.75	30	24	0	127.1	120	63	53	53	108
Tyler Skaggs	5	5	4.30	18	18	0	113.0	107	59	54	30	86
Joe Smith	7	2	1.81	76	0	15	74.2	45	16	15	15	68
Kevin Jepsen	0	2	2.63	74	0	2	65.0	45	19	19	23	75
Mike Morin	4	4	2.90	60	0	0	59.0	51	22	19	19	54
Fernando Salas	5	0	3.38	57	0	0	58.2	50	22	22	14	61
Cory Rasmus	3	2	2.57	30	6	0	56.0	42	17	16	17	57
Jason Grilli	1	3	3.48	40	0	1	33.2	29	15	13	10	36
Ernesto Frieri	0	3	6.39	34	0	11	31.0	33	22	22	9	38
Wade LeBlanc	1	1	3.45	10	3	0	28.2	25	11	11	6	21
Huston Street	1	2	1.71	28	0	17	26.1	24	5	5	7	23
Michael Kohn	2	1	3.04	25	0	0	23.2	11	9	8	20	26
Cam Bedrosian	0	1	6.52	17	0	0	19.1	23	17	14	12	20
Yoslan Herrera	1	1	2.70	20	0	0	16.2	22	5	5	9	13
Michael Roth	1	0	8.76	7	0	0	12.1	16	12	12	9	9
Vinnie Pestano	0	0	0.93	12	0	0	9.2	5	1	1	4	13
Drew Rucinski	0	0	4.91	3	0	0	7.1	9	4	4	2	8
Joe Thatcher	1	1	8.53	16	0	0	6.1	13	6	6	1	2
Nick Maronde	0	0	12.79	11	0	0	6.1	12	9	9	7	7
Jairo Díaz	0	0	3.18	5	0	0	5.2	4	2	2	3	8
David Carpenter	0	0	0.00	1	0	0	3.0	1	0	0	0	0
Dane De La Rosa	0	0	11.57	3	0	0	2.1	3	3	3	3	0
Josh Wall	0	0	54.00	2	0	0	1.0	5	6	6	3	0
Sean Burnett	0	0	13.50	3	0	0	0.2	1	1	1	0	0
José Álvarez	0	0	0.00	2	0	0	0.2	1	0	0	0	1
Jarrett Grube	0	0	13.50	1	0	0	0.2	1	1	1	0	0
Rich Hill	0	0	inf	2	0	0	0.0	1	1	1	3	0
Team totals	98	64	3.58	162	162	46	1482.2	1307	630	590	504	1342

== Post-season ==
=== Postseason game log ===
2014 Postseason Game Log (0–3)
American League Division Series vs. Kansas City Royals

#	Date	Opponent	Score	Win	Loss	Save	Attendance	Series
1	October 2	Royals	2–3 (11)	Duffy (1–0)	**Salas** (0–1)	Holland (1)	45,321	0–1
2	October 3	Royals	1–4 (11)	Finnegan (1-0)	Jepsen (0-1)	Holland (2)	45,361	0–2
3	October 5	@ Royals	3–8	Shields (1–0)	**Wilson** (0–1)		40,657	0–3

Legend: = Win = Loss = Postponement
Bold = Angels team member

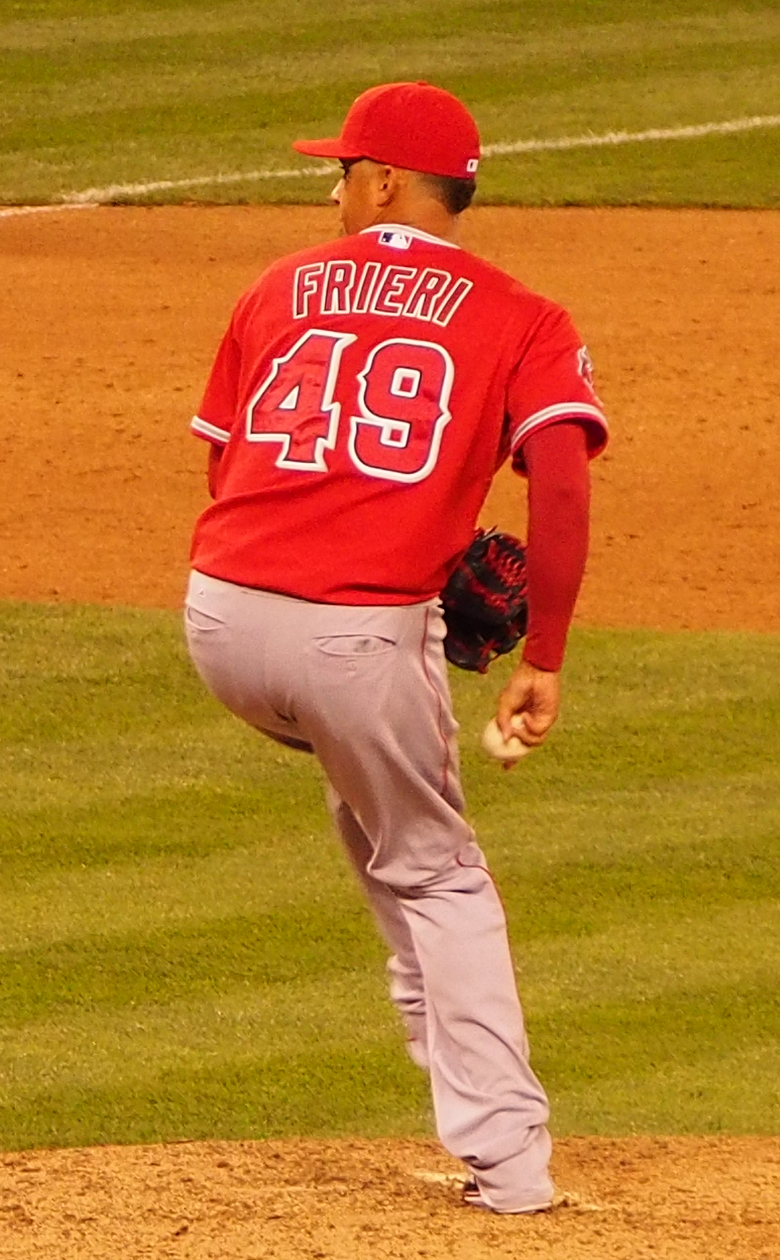
Ernesto Frieri struggled as the closer and was later replaced by Joe Smith. He was traded to the Pittsburgh Pirates for Jason Grilli later during the season. It wasn't long after Frieri was dealt to Pittsburgh until Huston Street arrived after a deal was struck with the San Diego Padres. Street became the new closer.

=== Roster ===
2014 Los Angeles Angels
**Roster**
**Pitchers**: 48 José Álvarez; 68 Cam Bedrosian; 24 Sean Burnett; 37,39 David Carpenter; 65 Dane De La Rosa; 49 Jairo Díaz; 49 Ernesto Frieri; 39 Jason Grilli; 51 Jarrett Grube; 60,62 Yoslan Herrera; 51 Rich Hill; 40 Kevin Jepsen; 58 Michael Kohn; 37,35 Wade LeBlanc; 63 Nick Maronde; 64 Mike Morin; 63 Vinnie Pestano; 46 Cory Rasmus; 43 Garrett Richards; 51,41 Michael Roth; 51 Drew Rucinski; 59 Fernando Salas; 53 Hector Santiago; 52 Matt Shoemaker; 45 Tyler Skaggs; 38 Joe Smith; 16 Huston Street; 54 Joe Thatcher; 35 Josh Wall; 36 Jered Weaver; 33 C. J. Wilson	**Catchers**: 44 John Buck; 16,24 Hank Conger; 17 Chris Iannetta; **Infielders**: 2 Erick Aybar; 18 Gordon Beckham; 20 C. J. Cron; 6 David Freese; 13 Luis Jiménez; 47 Howie Kendrick; 8 John McDonald; 19 Efren Navarro; 5 Albert Pujols; 44 Ian Stewart	**Outfielders**: 00,28 Brennan Boesch; 56 Kole Calhoun; 22 Tony Campana; 7 Collin Cowgill; 10 Grant Green; 32 Josh Hamilton; 28 Raúl Ibañez; 12 Shawn O'Malley; 3 J. B. Shuck; 27 Mike Trout	**Manager**: 14 Mike Scioscia; **Coaches**: 25 Don Baylor (hitting); 23 Mike Butcher (pitching); 9 Gary DiSarcina (third base); 21 Dino Ebel (bench); -- Rico Brogna (player information); 70 Tom Gregorio (bullpen catcher); 4 Alfredo Griffin (first base); 31 Dave Hansen (assistant hitting); 1 Bobby Knoop (infield); 66 Bill Lachemann (catching); 61 Steve Soliz (bullpen); 55 Paul Sorrento (assistant hitting)

== Farm system ==
Level	Team	League	Manager
AAA	Salt Lake Bees	Pacific Coast League	Keith Johnson
AA	Arkansas Travelers	Texas League	Phillip Wellman
A	Inland Empire 66ers	California League	Denny Hocking
A	Burlington Bees	Midwest League	Bill Richardson
Rookie	AZL Angels	Arizona League	Elio Sarmiento
Rookie	Orem Owlz	Pioneer League	Dave Stapleton

== See also ==
- Los Angeles Angels
- Angel Stadium

Records
Preceded by 2013	Los Angeles Angels seasons 2014	Succeeded by 2015
