= Ernesto Frieri =

Colombian baseball player (born 1985)

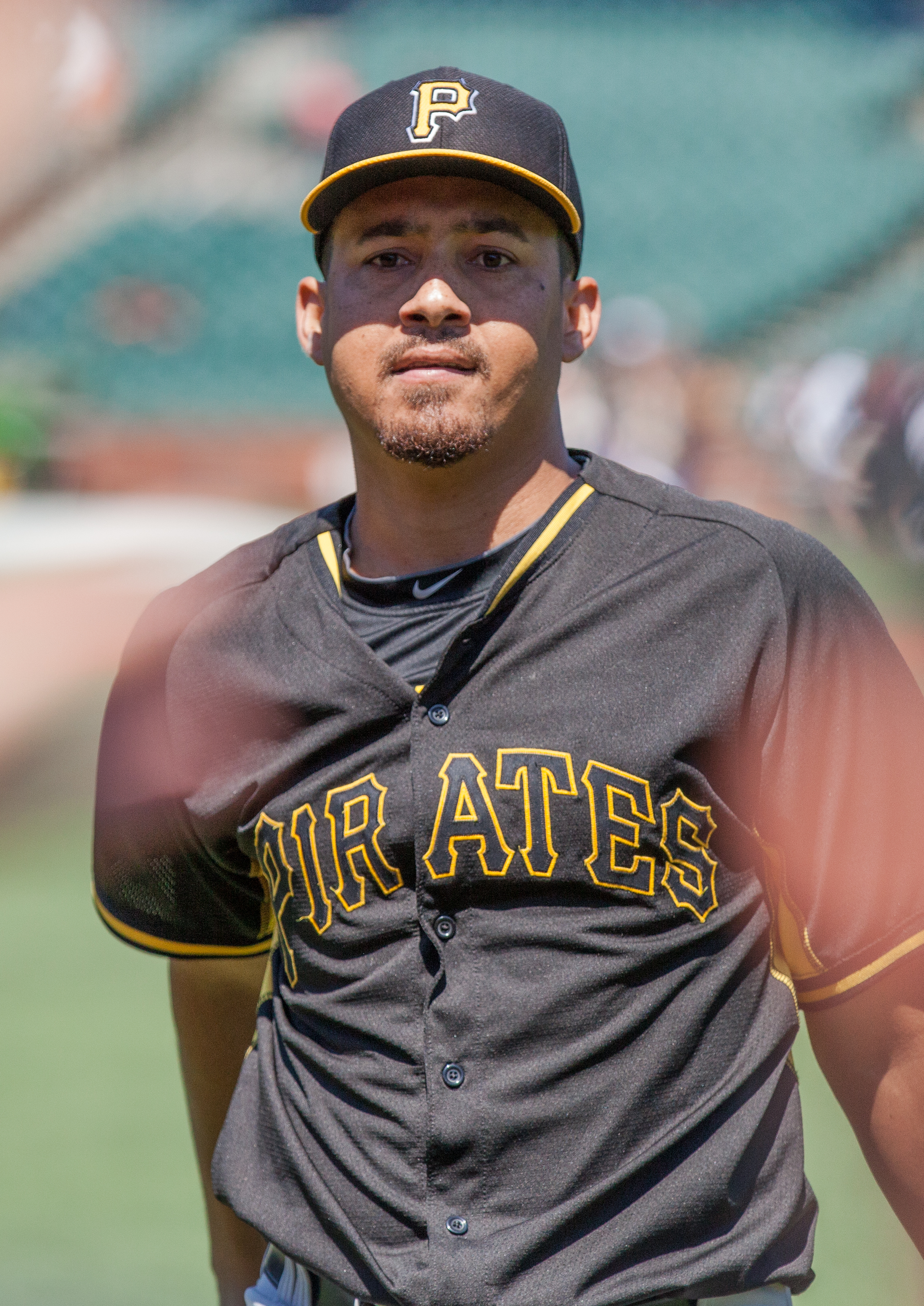
- Frieri with the Pittsburgh Pirates
- Pitcher
- Born: July 19, 1985 (age 41); Arjona, Colombia
- Batted: Right Threw: Right

MLB debut
- September 26, 2009, for the San Diego Padres

Last MLB appearance
- July 3, 2017, for the Texas Rangers

MLB statistics
- Win–loss record: 11–14
- Earned run average: 3.59
- Strikeouts: 387
- Saves: 73
- Stats at Baseball Reference

Teams
- San Diego Padres (2009–2012); Los Angeles Angels of Anaheim (2012–2014); Pittsburgh Pirates (2014); Tampa Bay Rays (2015); Texas Rangers (2017)
Medals
Men's baseball
Representing Colombia
Central American and Caribbean Games
Bronze medal – third place	2018 Barranquilla	Team

Ernesto Frieri Gutiérrez [free-eh'-ree] (born July 19, 1985) is a Colombian former professional baseball relief pitcher. He played in Major League Baseball (MLB) for the San Diego Padres, Los Angeles Angels of Anaheim, Pittsburgh Pirates, Tampa Bay Rays, and Texas Rangers.

== Professional career ==
=== San Diego Padres ===
Frieri was signed by scouts Robert Rowley and Marical DelValle. He began his professional career in 2005, splitting the season between the AZL Padres and Lake Elsinore Storm. For the AZL Padres, he went 7–1 with a 1.17 earned run average (ERA) in 17 games in five starts. In 46 1/3 innings pitched, he struck out 59 batters. In two relief appearances with the Storm, he went 0–0 with a 2.70 ERA.

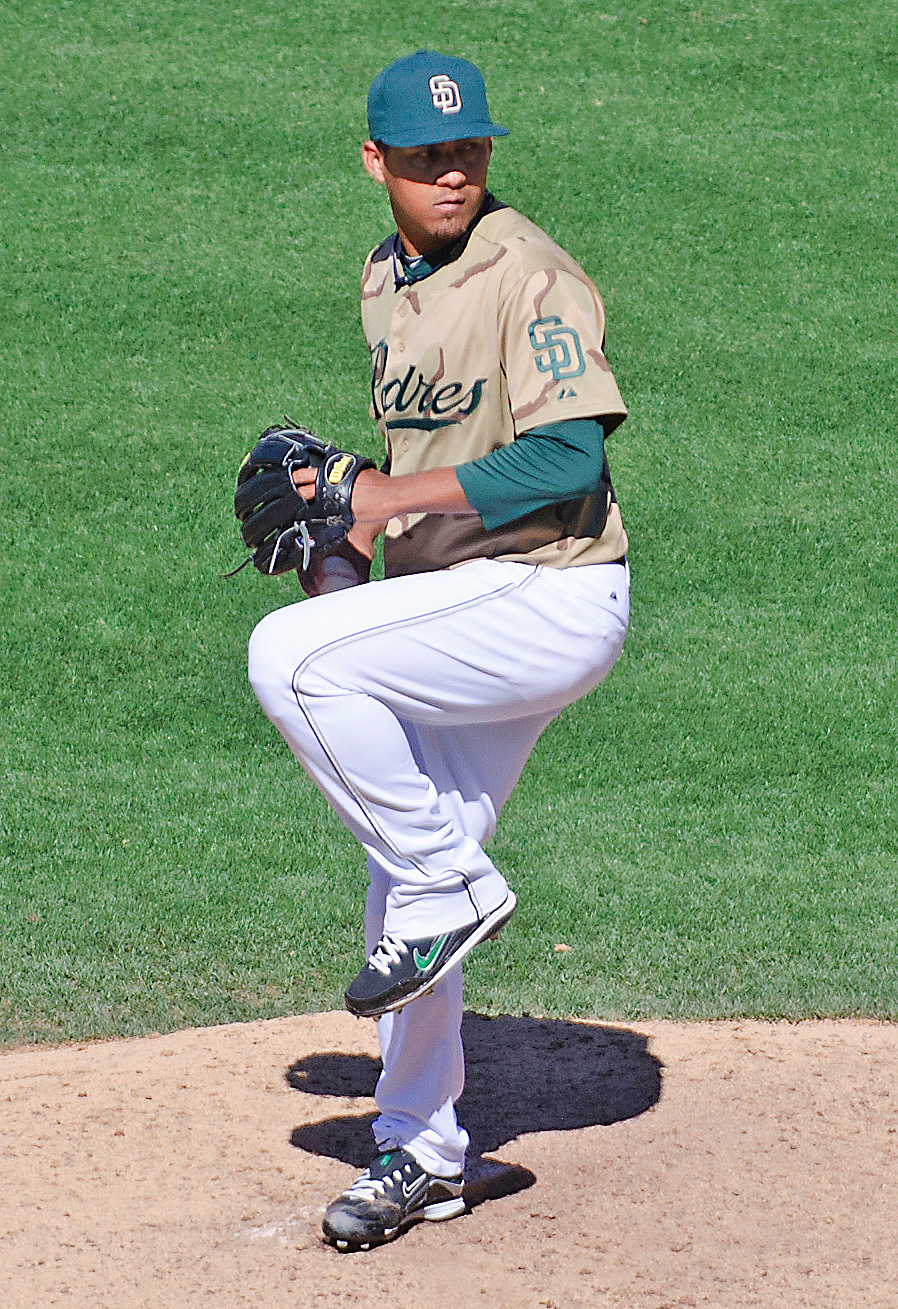
Frieri pitching for the San Diego Padres in 2010

In 2006, Frieri split the season between the Eugene Emeralds, Fort Wayne Wizards and Lake Elsinore Storm. With the Emeralds, he went 3–3 with a 3.82 ERA in 27 appearances in one start. In one game with the Wizards he had a 9.00 ERA, and in two games with the Storm he had a 6.00 ERA.

In 2007, Frieri played for the Wizards, appearing in 40 games, and Storm, appearing in 13 games, going a combined 2–2 with a 1.98 ERA and 92 strikeouts in 86 1/3 innings. In 2008, he played for the Storm, the Double-A San Antonio Missions and the Triple-A Portland Beavers. He went 8–6 with a 4.00 ERA in 33 games, appearing in 18 starts with the Storm. With the Missions, he went 1–0 with a 4.09 ERA in two games, and with the Beavers he went 1–0 with a 1.50 ERA in one game.

Frieri had a break-out year in 2009 playing for the Missions and the Padres. With the Missions, he went 10–9 with a 3.59 ERA with 118 strikeouts in 140 1/3 innings pitched appearing in 27 games, 26 for starts. He made the Texas League All-Star team and on July 27 was named as the Texas League Pitcher of the Week. On September 14 he and Luis Durango were called up to the Major Leagues. He made his Major League debut on September 26 against the Arizona Diamondbacks, pitching one inning of no-run ball and throwing two strikeouts. Frieri finished the 2009 season appearing in two games without giving up a run.

In 2010, Frieri made 33 appearances, sporting an ERA of 1.71 with 41 strikeouts. He became a permanent bullpen piece in 2011, appearing in 59 games for the Padres.

Frieri's pitching repertoire consists of a four-seam fastball (90–94 mph), which is his primary pitch, as well as a breaking ball (77–80) that is referred to variously as a curveball or a slider.

=== Los Angeles Angels of Anaheim ===
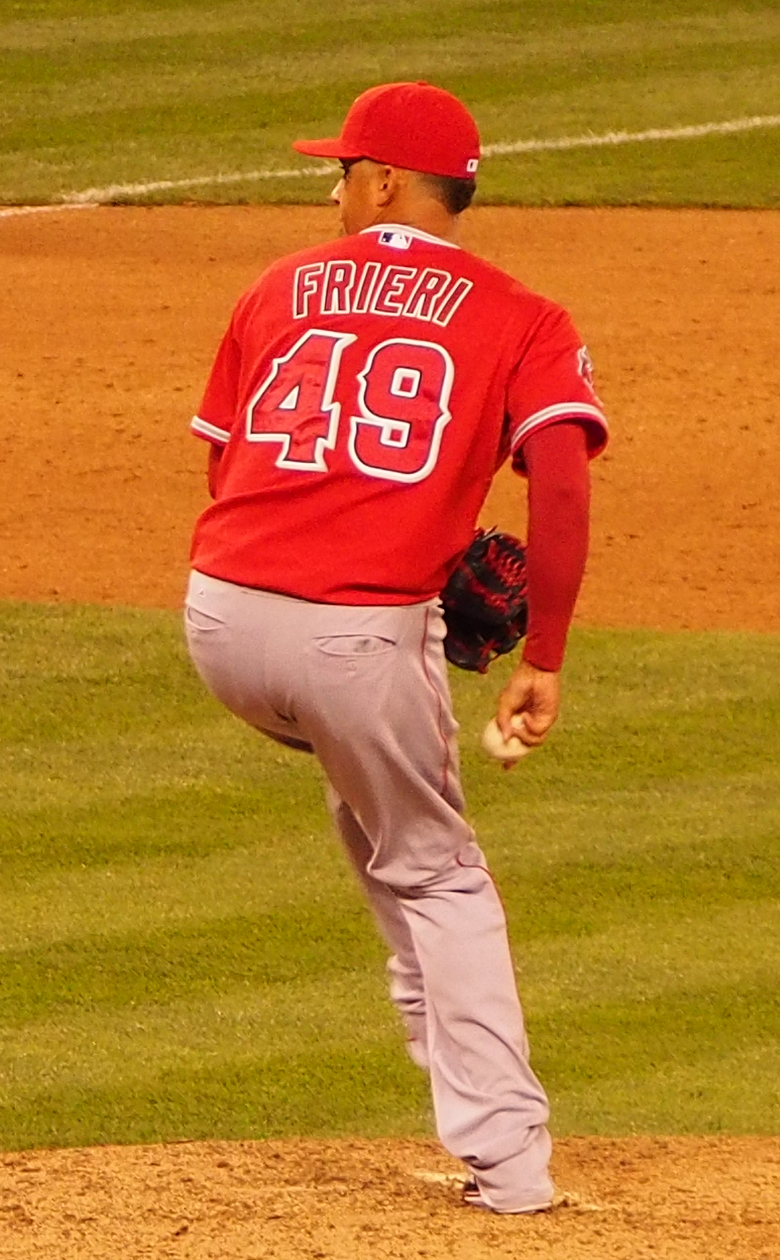
Frieri during his tenure with the Los Angeles Angels in 2014

On May 3, 2012, the Padres traded Frieri to the Los Angeles Angels of Anaheim for second baseman Alexi Amarista and minor league pitcher Donn Roach. Frieri earned his first career save on May 23, 2012, against the Oakland Athletics. On September 25, 2012, Frieri was one of five pitchers (Zack Greinke, Garrett Richards, Scott Downs, Kevin Jepsen) to combine for 20 strikeouts in a nine-inning game, tying a Major League Baseball record. For the season, Frieri notched 23 saves while striking out 80 batters in 54.1 innings for the Angels.

Frieri became the full-time closer for the Angels in 2013. He had a 3.80 ERA and recorded 37 saves, despite allowing 11 home runs.

On April 25, 2014, Frieri was pulled from the closer role in favor of Joe Smith after multiple poor outings. After a few questionable outings from Smith, Frieri and Smith began splitting the role. Through late June 2014, Frieri had an ERA of 6.39 and allowed eight home runs in 31 innings.

=== Pittsburgh Pirates ===
On June 27, 2014, Frieri was traded to the Pittsburgh Pirates in exchange for relief pitcher Jason Grilli.

Frieri did not recover his control, as he surrendered 12 runs in 10.2 innings for the Pirates and was designated for assignment on August 8, 2014, then outrighted to Triple-A Indianapolis Indians on August 13. On September 8, Frieri was released.

=== Tampa Bay Rays ===
On November 26, 2014, Frieri signed a one-year deal with the Tampa Bay Rays. On June 2, Frieri was designated for assignment by the Rays after once again suffering through bouts of extreme inconsistency. In 23.1 innings, Frieri struck out 19 while permitting 11 walks and 20 hits. He cleared waivers and was sent outright to Triple-A Durham Bulls on June 5. He became a free agent following the season on October 5.

=== Philadelphia Phillies ===
On December 14, 2015, Frieri signed a minor league deal with the Philadelphia Phillies. He was released on April 5, 2016. Frieri took off the 2016 season to work on his pitching mechanics.

=== New York Yankees ===
Frieri pitched in the 2017 World Baseball Classic for the Colombian national baseball team. After Colombia's elimination, On March 16, 2017, he signed a minor league contract with the New York Yankees. He exercised his opt out clause and became a free agent on June 4.

=== Texas Rangers ===
On June 6, 2017, Frieri signed a minor league contract with the Texas Rangers. He had his contract purchased on June 17, 2017. After allowing six runs in seven innings, Frieri was designated for assignment on July 4, 2017. On July 8, Frieri was outrighted to Triple-A.

=== Seattle Mariners ===
On August 8, 2017, Frieri was traded to the Seattle Mariners in exchange for $1. He elected free agency on October 2.

=== Milwaukee Brewers ===
On January 18, 2018, Frieri signed a minor league contract with the Milwaukee Brewers. He was released on March 18.

=== Acereros de Monclova ===
On April 5, 2018, Frieri signed with the Acereros de Monclova of the Mexican League. He was released on April 21, without appearing in a game.

== Coaching career ==
On January 21, 2026, Frieri was announced as the pitching coach for the Arizona Complex League Padres, the rookie-level affiliate of the San Diego Padres.
