= Tyler Skaggs =

American baseball player (1991–2019)

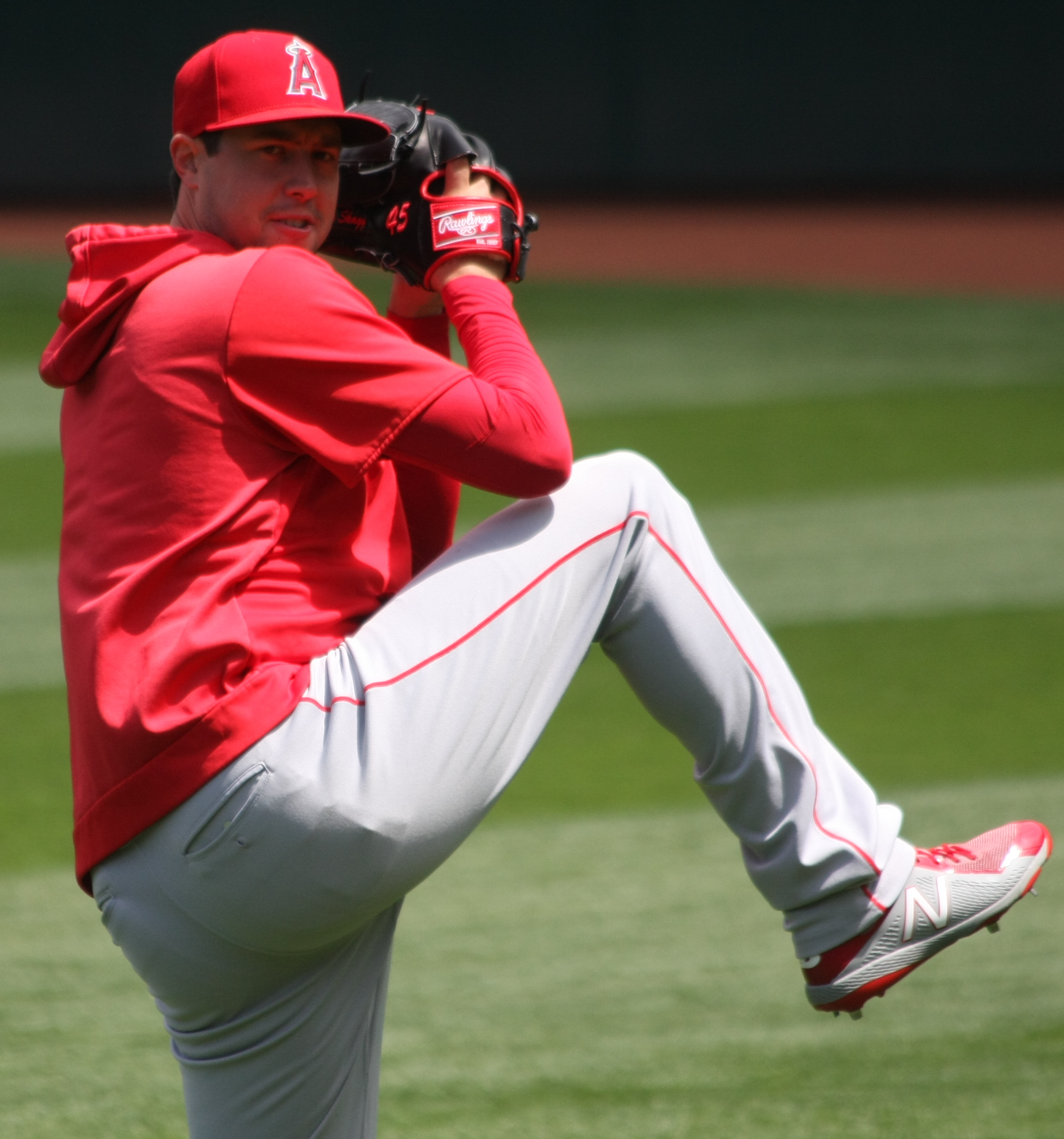
- Skaggs with the Angels in 2019
- Pitcher
- Born: July 13, 1991; Woodland Hills, California, U.S.
- Died: July 1, 2019 (aged 27); Southlake, Texas, U.S.
- Batted: Left Threw: Left

MLB debut
- August 22, 2012, for the Arizona Diamondbacks

Last MLB appearance
- June 29, 2019, for the Los Angeles Angels

MLB statistics
- Win–loss record: 28–38
- Earned run average: 4.41
- Strikeouts: 476
- Stats at Baseball Reference

Teams
- Arizona Diamondbacks (2012–2013); Los Angeles Angels of Anaheim / Los Angeles Angels (2014, 2016–2019)

Tyler Wayne Skaggs (July 13, 1991 – July 1, 2019) was an American professional baseball player. A starting pitcher, he played seven seasons in Major League Baseball (MLB) for the Arizona Diamondbacks and Los Angeles Angels between 2012 and 2019.

A native of Woodland Hills, California, and a graduate of Santa Monica High School, Skaggs was a supplemental first-round selection for the Angels in the 2009 Major League Baseball draft. He was traded to the Diamondbacks the following year as part of an exchange for pitcher Dan Haren and rose through Arizona's farm system. After two consecutive appearances at the All-Star Futures Game in 2011 and 2012, Skaggs made his major league debut on August 22, 2012, against the Miami Marlins. He remained with the Diamondbacks through the end of the season, but was optioned to the minor leagues in 2013.

In December 2013, the Diamondbacks traded Skaggs back to the Angels, and he served as the fifth member of the team's starting pitching rotation until an ulnar collateral ligament (UCL) injury and subsequent Tommy John surgery derailed his season on July 31, 2014. Despite his initial plans to begin pitching in the minor leagues by the end of the 2015 season, Skaggs did not start practicing again until the beginning of the 2016 season and returned to the Angels mound that July. Although he figured prominently in the Angels' rotation between 2017 and 2019, Skaggs continued missing large parts of each season because of injury. Through June 2019, he posted a career earned run average (ERA) of 4.41, recorded 476 strikeouts, and had a win–loss record of 28–38.

On July 1, 2019, Skaggs was found unresponsive in his hotel room in Southlake, Texas, where the Angels had been visiting for a series against the Texas Rangers. He was pronounced dead the same day. An autopsy concluded at the end of August that Skaggs had accidentally died of asphyxia after aspirating his own vomit while under the influence of fentanyl, oxycodone, and alcohol. That October, former Angels director of communications Eric Kay was indicted on charges relating to Skaggs's death when he admitted to providing opiates to various members of the Angels, including Skaggs. Kay was convicted on two counts relating to Skaggs's death in February 2022. The Angels wore a No. 45 patch on their jerseys for the rest of the 2019 season in memory of Skaggs, while his widow and mother set up a charitable foundation in his name.

== Early life ==
Tyler Skaggs was born in Woodland Hills, California, on July 13, 1991. His parents were athletes: his mother Debbie was a longtime head softball coach at Santa Monica High School, while his father Darnell played high school baseball as a shortstop. His stepfather, Dan Ramos, played college baseball as well. Growing up, Skaggs attended his mother's softball practices, where he assisted the players by fielding balls.

Skaggs was a three-sport athlete at Santa Monica High School, playing baseball, basketball, and football. His favorite sport was basketball, about which he described himself as "not the greatest dribbler" but being able to shoot. His high school baseball coach, Rob Duron, gave Skaggs the nicknames "Tall and Skinny" and "Pole". In 2008, his junior year of high school, Skaggs was named the Ocean League's Player of the Year after posting a 1.11 earned run average (ERA), with 89 strikeouts, 44 hits allowed, and 22 walks in 63 1/3 innings pitched. During Skaggs' senior year, several professional baseball scouts watched Skaggs play, including Tommy Lasorda. Santa Monica athletic director Norm Lacy once called Skaggs the school's best baseball player since Tim Leary, who helped pitch the Los Angeles Dodgers to victory in the 1988 World Series.

== Professional career ==
=== Draft and minor leagues (2009–2012) ===
Going into the 2009 Major League Baseball draft, the Los Angeles Angels of Anaheim had two first-round draft picks, as well as three supplemental first-round picks. With these five selections, they drafted two outfielders, Randal Grichuk and Mike Trout; and three pitchers: Skaggs, Garrett Richards, and Tyler Kehrer. Skaggs was the 40th overall selection in the 2009 draft, taken 15 slots after Trout. He had committed previously to play college baseball for Cal State Fullerton, but he chose to sign with the Angels on August 7, 2009, for a $1 million bonus instead.

Skaggs made his professional baseball debut on August 22, 2009, relieving starting pitcher Fabio Martinez with a scoreless sixth inning for the AZL Angels in a 2–1 win against the AZL Athletics. He pitched ten Rookie League innings that season, playing in both the Arizona League and with the Orem Owlz of the Pioneer League. Between the two teams, Skaggs posted a 1.80 ERA as a rookie. In 2010 Skaggs and Trout lived as roommates while they played for the Cedar Rapids Kernels of the Class A Midwest League, befriending each other and the family that had rented out their basement to the players. Skaggs pitched in 19 games for the Kernels that year, starting 14, and posted a 8–4 win–loss record with a 3.61 ERA during that time. Skaggs was also one of seven Kernels named to the 2010 Midwest League All-Star team.

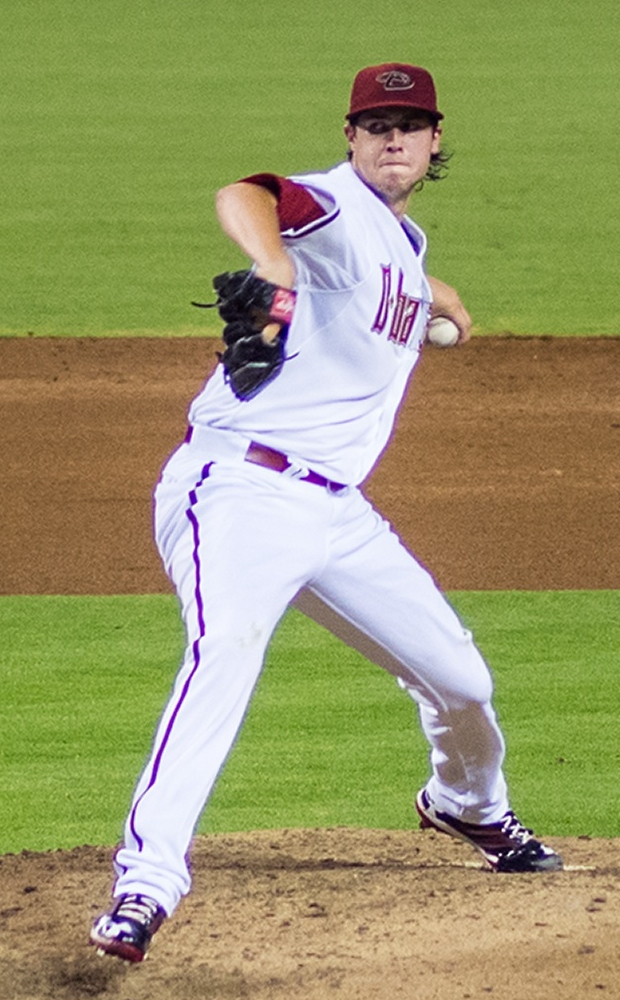
Skaggs pitched for the Diamondbacks in 2013.

On July 25, 2010, Skaggs was one of several players sent to the Arizona Diamondbacks in exchange for three-time All-Star pitcher Dan Haren. In exchange for Haren the Diamondbacks received pitcher Joe Saunders, prospects Patrick Corbin and Rafael Rodríguez, and a player to be named later, speculated to be Skaggs. Skaggs was not named officially at the time of the trade because Major League Baseball prohibited any player from being traded until they had played professional baseball for one full year. Therefore, while the trade was made at the end of July, Skaggs remained with the Kernels until August 7. Once Skaggs was eligible to be traded, the Diamondbacks assigned him to the Class A South Bend Silver Hawks of the Midwest League. There, he posted a 1–1 record and a 1.69 ERA in four starts and sixteen total innings. Between the two Midwest League teams, Skaggs' 2010 record was 9–5, and he posted a 3.29 ERA with 102 strikeouts.

Skaggs was assigned to the Class A-Advanced Visalia Rawhide of the California League to start the 2011 season, where he anchored the team's starting rotation. He started 17 games with the Rawhide that season, posting a 5–5 record and a 3.22 ERA while striking out 125 batters in 100 2/3 innings. Although Visalia finished in fifth place in the California League North Division, the league named Skaggs both a midseason and postseason all-star. On July 10, 2011, Skaggs was chosen as the starting pitcher for Team USA at the annual All-Star Futures Game. In the one inning he pitched Skaggs gave up one hit and one walk, recorded one strikeout, and left two batters on base. The next day, Skaggs was promoted from Visalia to the Double-A Mobile BayBears of the Southern League. In ten starts with Mobile, Skaggs went 4–1 with a 2.50 ERA and 73 strikeouts in 57 2/3 innings. At the end of the season, the Diamondbacks named Skaggs their minor league pitcher of the year.

The BayBears kept Skaggs through the beginning of the 2012 season. In thirteen starts with the team that year, he posted a 5–4 record and averaged more than one strikeout per inning. At the end of June, Skaggs was promoted to the Reno Aces of the Triple-A Pacific Coast League. There, he went 5–5 with a 2.91 ERA and 45 strikeouts, and Reno captured their first Pacific Coast League championship title. Skaggs was one of five players to appear in both the 2011 and 2012 MLB All-Star Futures games, the others being Nolan Arenado, Manny Machado, Wil Myers, and Jurickson Profar. He was not originally named to the Futures game but was selected to replace Trevor Bauer after Bauer was called up to make his major league debut.

=== Arizona Diamondbacks (2012–2013) ===
The Diamondbacks called Skaggs up to the major leagues on August 21, 2012, to start the first game of a same-day doubleheader against the Miami Marlins. He made his MLB debut the next day, giving up two runs in 6 1/3 innings in a 3–2 win against the Marlins. Skaggs stayed with the Diamondbacks until he was shut down for the season on September 24, following three consecutive poor outings and a drop in his fastball's velocity. He went 1–3 in his major league rookie season, with a 5.83 ERA in six starts.

Going into the 2013 season, MLB.com named Skaggs the 10th overall MLB prospect, and the highest-rated prospect in the Diamondbacks organization. He entered spring training a contender with Patrick Corbin and Randall Delgado for the final spot in the Diamondbacks' starting rotation, but was ultimately optioned to the Aces before the start of the season. He spent most of the 2013 season with the Aces, but made one appearance with Visalia, where he recorded eight strikeouts. Skaggs also made seven major league starts with the Diamondbacks, ending the season with a 2–3 record and a 5.12 ERA. During this time, Skaggs also struggled with opioid abuse, which he disclosed to his family after the 2013 season. After this disclosure, he ceased his Percocet consumption cold turkey.

=== Los Angeles Angels of Anaheim / Los Angeles Angels (2014–2019) ===
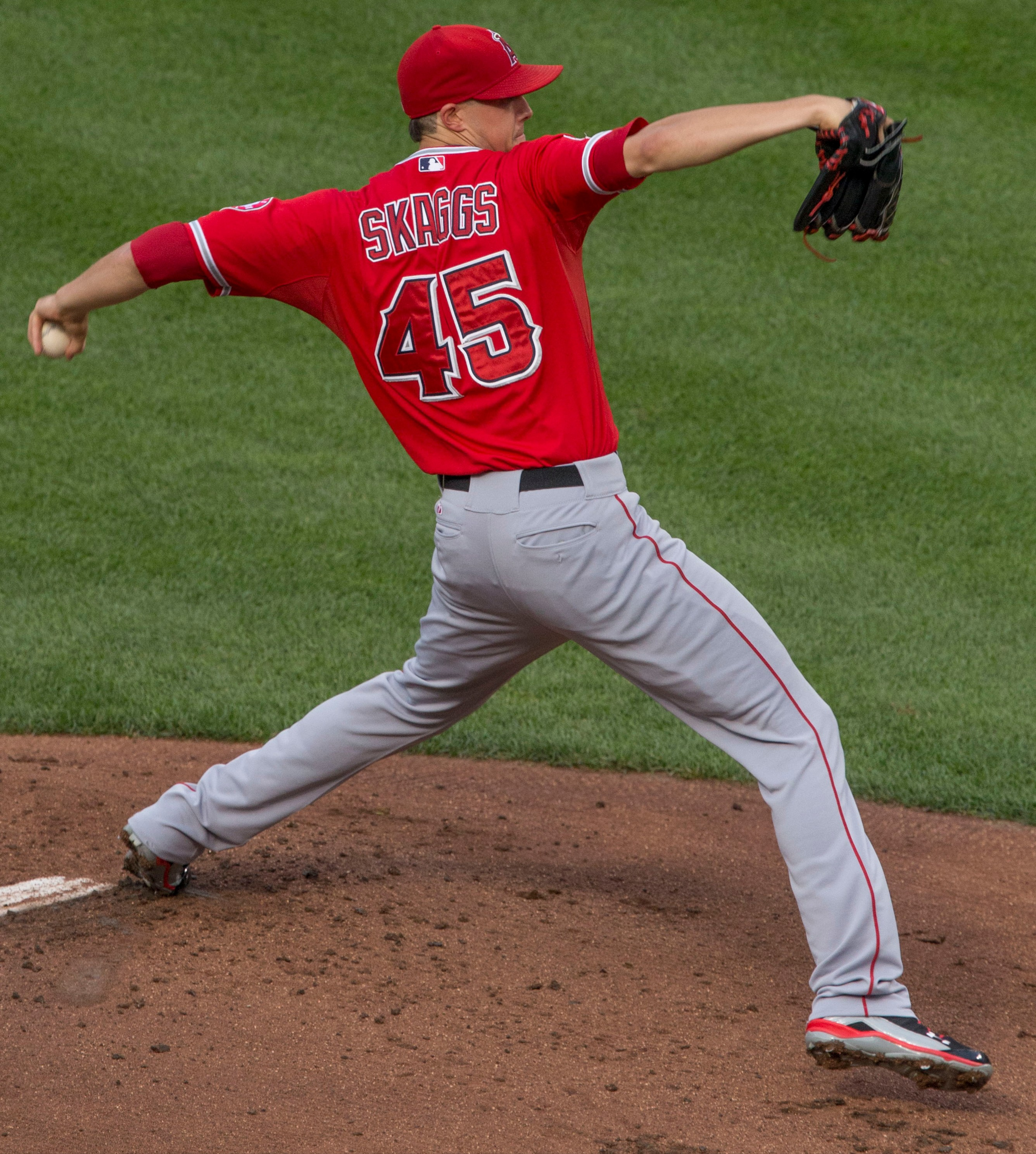
Skaggs pitched for the Angels in 2014.

Skaggs was part of a three-team trade conducted on December 10, 2013. He and pitcher Hector Santiago were sent to the Angels, while outfielder Adam Eaton went to the Chicago White Sox. Arizona received Mark Trumbo, as well as two players to be named later. Arizona general manager Kevin Towers told reporters that the team had looked to trade Skaggs after concerns emerged over his decreased confidence, command, and pitch velocity – his fastball speed, for instance, had dropped from a high of 90.6 mph (145.8 km/h) to 88.7 mph (142.7 km/h) over the course of the previous season.

Leading into the 2014 season Skaggs was in competition for the fifth place in the Angels' starting rotation with veteran Joe Blanton. He spent spring training focusing on enhancing his fastball command and developing the other pitches in his arsenal. He also made a mechanical tweak to his pitching mechanics, returning to the larger stride that he took in high school and as a member of the Angels' farm system. Skaggs was named to the Angels' opening day roster that spring, joining a rotation that also featured Santiago, Jered Weaver, C. J. Wilson, and Garrett Richards. After going 4–4 with a 4.34 ERA in his first twelve starts, Skaggs was scratched from his scheduled June 9 start against the Oakland Athletics. Manager Mike Scioscia revealed that Skaggs was suffering from a strained right hamstring and was placed on the disabled list as a precaution. He spent nearly a month on the disabled list before being activated on July 2 to start in a game against the White Sox.

On July 31, 2014, Skaggs left a potential no-hitter in the fifth inning after experiencing left forearm tightness and was relieved by Mike Morin, who lost Skaggs's no-hit bid by giving up a hit to Baltimore Orioles' batter Caleb Joseph. After MRI tests revealed a strain to the common flexor tendon of Skaggs's arm, the Angels placed the pitcher on the 15-day disabled list. On August 10 the team revealed he had sustained a partial tear of the ulnar collateral ligament and would need to undergo a season-ending Tommy John surgery to repair his arm. At the time of the injury, Skaggs had posted a 5–5 season record with a 4.30 ERA in eighteen starts. Due to his former issues with opioid addiction, Skaggs's mother and surgeon prevented him from taking any painkillers that were stronger than Tylenol 3.

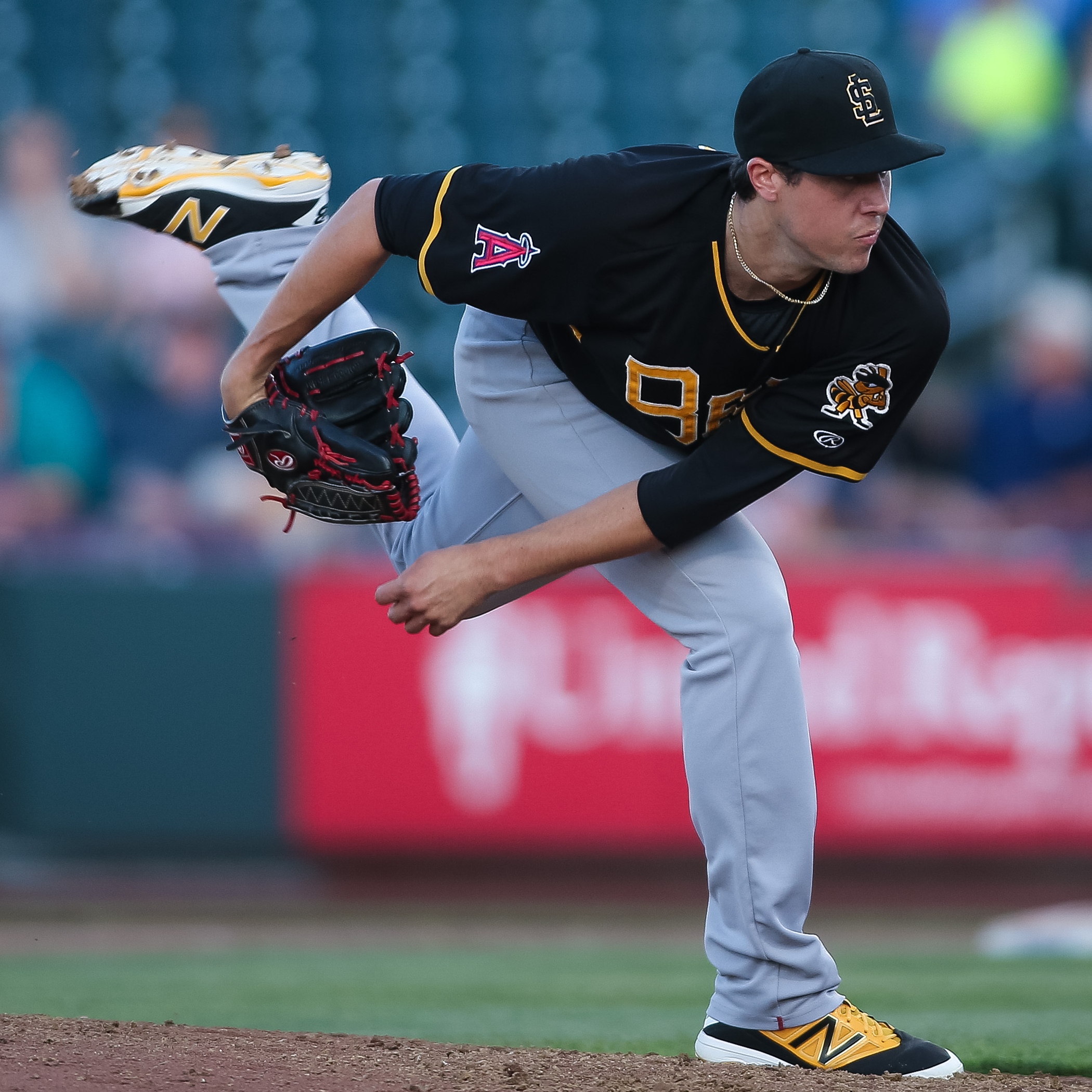
Skaggs pitched for the Salt Lake Bees in 2016.

Originally, Skaggs wanted to start his rehabilitation in the minor leagues during the 2015 season, but after seeing Matt Harvey of the New York Mets successfully return to the mound after eighteen months of Tommy John rehabilitation, he decided to wait until the 2016 season to pitch again. Skaggs was assigned to the Triple-A Salt Lake Bees at the start of the season to build his endurance before returning to the Angels. A bout of biceps tendinitis in April set back Skaggs's recovery, but by July, he was able to begin rehab assignments with the Class-A Advanced Inland Empire 66ers and with the Bees. He made his first major league start since undergoing surgery on July 26, 2016, pitching seven scoreless innings in a 13–0 win against the Kansas City Royals. Striking out five, Skaggs allowed three hits, and his only walk of the night was Alcides Escobar. Skaggs finished his first season back with a 3–4 record and a 4.17 ERA.

Injuries continued to trouble Skaggs's time with the Angels. On April 28, 2017, he left a game against the Texas Rangers in the fifth inning with muscle pain, later diagnosed as a Grade 2 oblique muscle strain with a typical recovery time of ten to twelve weeks. The injury kept him out of the lineup for fourteen weeks after he suffered a recurrence of oblique pain shortly before a scheduled rehab assignment in July. He returned to the mound on August 5, throwing 83 pitches and giving up three runs on six hits in four innings. Skaggs was limited to eighty-five innings across sixteen starts in 2017. He went 2–6 with a 4.55 ERA and 76 strikeouts. Throughout the 2018 season, a recurrent adductor muscle strain placed Skaggs on the disabled list on three separate occasions. Between the second and third instances, the injury seemed to impact his performance: after nineteen starts with a 2.62 ERA, Skaggs gave up 17 runs in 6 2/3 innings across two starts. Despite the injury, the 2018 season proved to be the best of Skaggs's career, as he set career highs with eight wins, twenty-four starts, 125 1/3 innings pitched, and 129 strikeouts. His 0.84 ERA in June set an Angels record for all pitchers with a minimum of thirty innings. Skaggs went 8–10 for the year, with an overall ERA of 4.02.

On April 12, 2019, Skaggs sprained his left ankle in the fourth inning of a game against the Chicago Cubs when he landed in a divot on the pitcher's mound at Wrigley Field. He attempted to pitch through the injury, but he could not push off the foot, and his fastball speed dropped by 5 mph (8.0 km/h) almost at once. After recording the third out of the inning, Skaggs was removed from the game and placed on the injured list. (Note: Prior to the 2019 season, the disabled list was renamed the injured list.) He returned from the injury on April 26, pitching five scoreless innings against the Kansas City Royals and seeing fastball speeds up to 94 mph (151 km/h). Upon his return Skaggs led the Angels' rotation with seven wins and 78 strikeouts. Skaggs continued to suffer from physical pain which he managed through self-medication. In the final start of his career Skaggs threw 91 pitches in 4 1/3 innings against the Oakland Athletics, and sportswriter Nathan Fenno observed him to be less effective than he had been throughout the season. In total Skaggs posted a 28–38 win–loss record and a 4.41 ERA for his major league career, striking out 476 batters in 520 2/3 innings pitched.

== Pitching style ==
A 2009 MLB scouting report described Skaggs as a "young Barry Zito type", a "decent lefty" with "two above-average pitches". The report praised his 92 mph (148 km/h) fastball and 70–73 mph (113–117 km/h) curveball in particular, while noting some weakness in his pitch delivery. In 2012 Mike Newman of FanGraphs proclaimed Skaggs's 76–77 miles per hour (122–124 km/h) curveball the best in Minor League Baseball, but declared that his 80–81 miles per hour (129–130 km/h) changeup was in need of "additional refinement". By 2014, his main pitches included a 94 mph (151 km/h) four-seam fastball, a curveball, and a changeup, occasionally utilizing a sinker as a self-proclaimed "secret weapon".

Skaggs credited his recovery time after Tommy John surgery with improving his pitching technique. He told the Deseret News that the injury and recovery process helped him better understand his body and that he returned with more comfort and skill. He continued to fall back primarily on his fastball and curve after returning to the mound, but began reintegrating his changeup into his pitching rotation during the 2018 season.

== Personal life ==
Skaggs married his girlfriend, Carli Miles, on New Year's Eve in 2018. During the offseason, he trained at Pepperdine University in Malibu, California, with fellow MLB players Scott and Tyler Heineman. He remained close friends with Angels teammates Andrew Heaney and Patrick Corbin throughout his baseball career, and served as a groomsman at Corbin's wedding. Of Mexican descent on his mother's side, Skaggs had planned to represent Mexico at the 2021 World Baseball Classic.

== Death ==
On June 30, 2019, Skaggs texted Eric Kay, the communications director for the Angels, asking for painkillers. That night, Skaggs did not respond to his wife Carli's good-night text, which she typically sent when he was on the road. The following day, Skaggs was found unresponsive in his hotel room in Southlake, Texas. He was pronounced dead at the scene. He was 27 years old. Investigators discovered a number of pills in Skaggs's hotel room, including a 30 mg oxycodone pill, additional 5 mg oxycodone pills, several anti-inflammatories, and white powder on the floor. The Angels had been in Arlington, Texas, to play a four-game series against the Rangers, and Skaggs was scheduled to start the Fourth of July game. Upon news of his death, both teams agreed to postpone the start of the series, which had been scheduled for later that day. The initial statement issued by the Southlake Police Department said that neither suicide nor foul play were suspected.

The Tarrant County Medical Examiner conducted an autopsy and found a mix of fentanyl, oxycodone, and alcohol in Skaggs's system and that he had a blood alcohol level of 0.12. The examination concluded that Skaggs had died of asphyxia after aspirating his own vomit, and his death was ruled an accident. The Drug Enforcement Administration (DEA) later determined that fentanyl, a synthetic opioid 30 to 50 times more potent than heroin, was the primary contributor to Skaggs's death, and that he likely would have survived if not for the substance.

=== Memorials ===
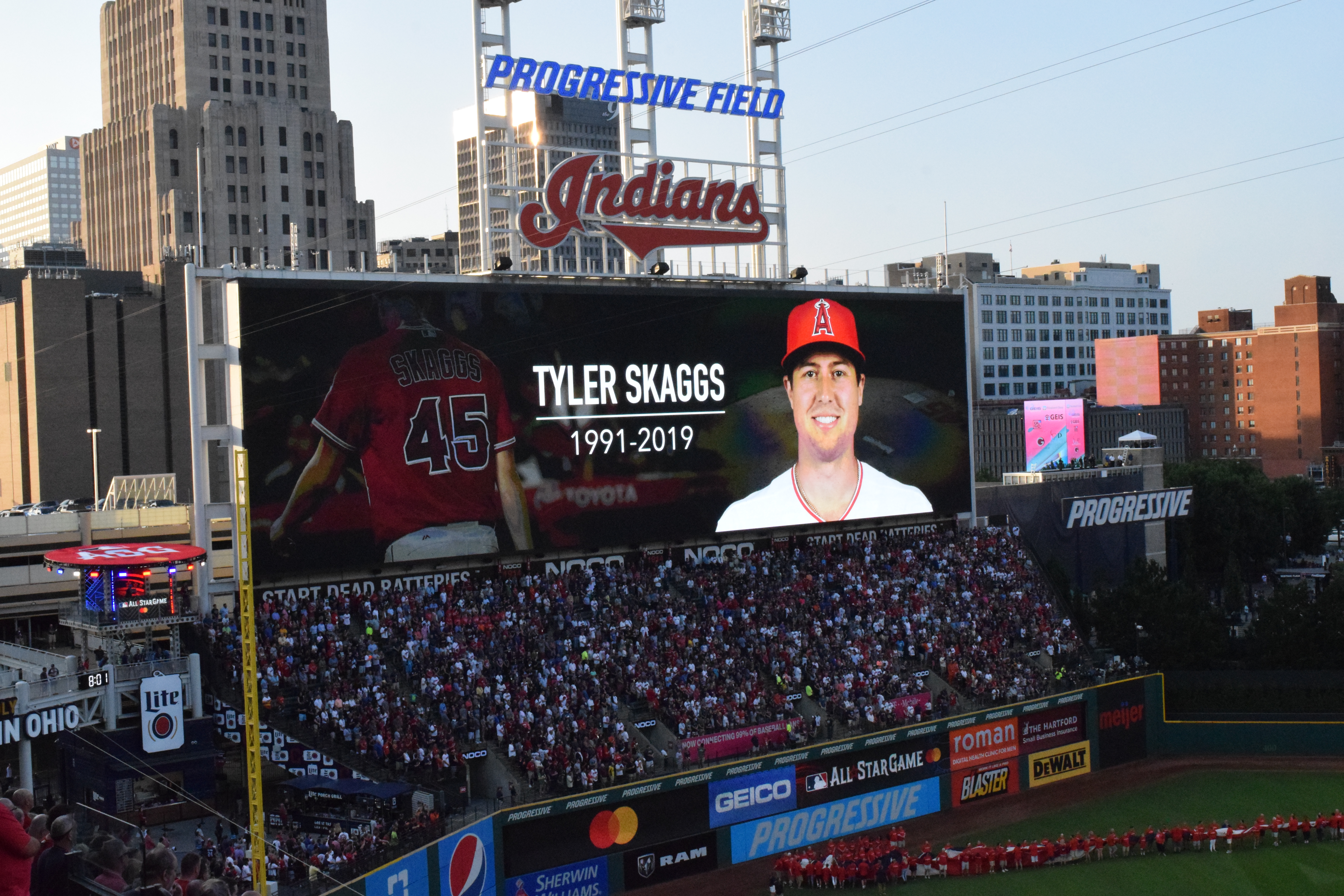
Skaggs was honored at the 2019 MLB All-Star Game.

News of Skaggs's death triggered an outpouring of grief in MLB. On July 2, Patrick Corbin of the Washington Nationals, who was drafted in the same round as Skaggs and had been traded with him to Arizona, switched his jersey number to Skaggs's No. 45 for a game against the Miami Marlins. Mike Trout and Tommy La Stella, the Angels' two All-Star representatives, also wore No. 45 to honor Skaggs at the 2019 MLB All-Star Game. On Players Weekend in 2019 all major league players wore a No. 45 patch on their jerseys. Corbin, Ryan Braun, Jesse Chavez, Jack Flaherty, Max Fried, Lucas Giolito, Scott Heineman, Mike Moustakas, and Christian Yelich also wore nicknames that honored Skaggs. All the Angels' players wore a No. 45 patch for the rest of the 2019 season.

On July 6, 2019, Andrew Heaney made his first start since the death of his fellow left-hander and best friend. His first pitch against George Springer of the Houston Astros was Skaggs's signature overhand slow curveball, and it went intentionally unchallenged with no swing. On July 12, at their first home game after Skaggs's death, every player on the Angels wore his No. 45 jersey. His mother, Debbie Hetman, threw the ceremonial first pitch, which Heaney caught. Angels pitchers Taylor Cole and Félix Peña combined to throw a no-hitter against the Seattle Mariners, winning 13–0. It was the first combined no-hitter in California since July 13, 1991, the day of Skaggs's birth. After the game, the players removed their memorial jerseys and laid them on the mound to honor his memory.

After his death, Skaggs's wife and mother started the Tyler Skaggs Foundation, meant to support childhood athletic programs. The MLB Players Trust donated $45,000 to the foundation on July 22, 2019. The inaugural Tyler Skaggs Foundation all-star game took place at Jackie Robinson Stadium on July 10, 2021.

=== Legal action ===
Following the results of Skaggs's autopsy, the Southlake Police Department released a statement that the case surrounding his death was still open, while the Tarrant County Criminal District Attorney's Office had not opened an investigation. Skaggs's family, meanwhile, hired Texas attorney Rusty Hardin to investigate the circumstances surrounding his death. On October 13, after an investigation by the DEA, Kay told authorities he had provided oxycodone to Skaggs for years, and he gave the DEA the names of five other players within the organization that he believed were using opiates. Kay was arrested on August 7, 2020, and later indicted by a federal grand jury on October 15, on charges related to Skaggs's death. Kay's trial date was postponed multiple times, first due to Kay's attorney William Reagan Wynn contracting COVID-19 during the COVID-19 pandemic in North America, and then because of complications from the 2021 Texas power crisis. After nearly three years of delays, the trial began on February 8, 2022. During the trial, Skaggs's teammates Matt Harvey, Mike Morin, Cam Bedrosian, and C. J. Cron testified that Kay had provided them with oxycodone pills. Harvey additionally testified that he had provided Skaggs with Percocet pills on several occasions. On February 17, Kay was found guilty on two counts relating to Skaggs's death: distribution of controlled substances resulting in death, and conspiracy to possess with intent to distribute controlled substances. The jury reached a verdict after only 90 minutes of deliberation. On October 11, Kay was sentenced to 22 years in prison.

After Kay's indictment legal experts like Marc Edelman, a professor at the City University of New York who specializes in sports law, questioned whether the Angels would face legal repercussions for Skaggs's death. On June 29, 2021, Skaggs's widow and parents filed a wrongful death and negligence lawsuit against Kay, the Angels, and former Angels vice president of communications Tim Mead. The lawsuit accused the team of allowing Kay, who had a history of substance abuse, "unrestricted access" to members of the Angels, who were "at risk of turning to medication to assist with pain management" because of the "rigors of a 162-game schedule". A wrongful death trial began in the Orange County, California Superior Court on October 14, 2025. After 31 days of trial testimony, jury deliberations began. The panel agreed to award Skaggs's family $100 million in damages, but on December 19, Skaggs's family and the Angels came to an independent settlement.

The circumstances of Skaggs's death prompted MLB to consider adding random opioid screenings to the league's drug testing program. While opioids like oxycodone and fentanyl were considered "drugs of abuse" under MLB policy, players were not tested unless there was reasonable cause, or if they were part of a drug treatment program. On December 12, 2019, MLB and the players' union agreed to start regularly testing players for both opioids and cocaine, and to assign players and team staff to mandatory educational programs on the dangers of prescription painkillers. No opioid violations were found in MLB in the first two years after testing was implemented.

== See also ==
- List of baseball players who died during their careers
- List of deaths from drug overdose and intoxication
- 27 Club
