= Jarrett Grube =

American baseball player (born 1981)

- Pitcher
- Born: November 5, 1981 (age 44); Fort Wayne, Indiana, U.S.
- Batted: Right Threw: Right

MLB debut
- May 31, 2014, for the Los Angeles Angels of Anaheim

Last MLB appearance
- May 31, 2014, for the Los Angeles Angels of Anaheim

MLB statistics
- Win–loss record: 0–0
- Earned run average: 13.50
- Strikeouts: 0
- Stats at Baseball Reference

Teams
- Los Angeles Angels of Anaheim (2014)
Medals
Men's baseball
Representing United States
WBSC Premier12
Silver medal – second place	2015 Tokyo	Team

Jarrett George Grube (born November 5, 1981) is an American former professional baseball pitcher. He played one game in Major League Baseball (MLB) the Los Angeles Angels of Anaheim.

== Career ==
Grube attended DeKalb High School and played college baseball for Vincennes University and the University of Memphis.

=== Colorado Rockies ===
Grube was drafted in the 10th round of the 2004 MLB draft by the Colorado Rockies. He began his minor league career as a starter but then was shifted to the bullpen in 2006. He pitched for the Rockies minor league system until his release in 2009.

=== Southern Maryland Blue Crabs ===
Grube signed with the Southern Maryland Blue Crabs of the Atlantic League of Professional Baseball for the remainder of the 2009 season. He continued to pitch for the Blue Crabs in 2010.

=== Seattle Mariners ===
On June 7, 2010, Grube signed a minor league contract with the Seattle Mariners organization.

=== Los Angeles Angels of Anaheim ===
On July 26, 2012, Grube signed a minor league contract with the Los Angeles Angels of Anaheim.

Grube was promoted to the major leagues for the first time on May 31, 2014. Grube made his MLB debut that day, pitching 2/3 of an inning against the Oakland Athletics, and allowing a home run. He was returned to the minors after the game to make room on the roster for Josh Hamilton. He would not appear in another Major League game in his career which would consist of just seven pitches. On June 6, Grube was removed from the 40–man roster and sent outright to the Triple–A Salt Lake Bees.

=== Cleveland Indians ===
Grube signed a minor league contract with the Cleveland Indians on June 21, 2015. He elected free agency on November 6. He signed another minor league contract with the Indians on December 18, 2015, and was released on June 8, 2016.

=== Seattle Mariners (second stint) ===
Grube signed a minor league contract with Seattle Mariners on June 9, 2016, and was assigned to Triple-A Tacoma Rainiers. He was called up to the Major League club briefly on August 10, and returned to the minors on August 11. He became a free agent at the end of the season.

=== Toronto Blue Jays ===
On November 28, 2016, he signed a minor league contract that included an invitation to spring training with the Toronto Blue Jays.

=== Cleveland Indians (second stint) ===
On June 18, 2017, Grube was traded to the Cleveland Indians organization in exchange for cash considerations. In 14 starts for the Triple–A Columbus Clippers, Grube registered a 5–6 record and 3.56 ERA with 56 strikeouts in 78 1/3 innings pitched. He elected free agency following the season on November 6.

The Indians invited Grube to return for spring training in 2018 but he had already decided to retire to spend more time with his family, including his young daughter.

== Personal life ==
As of May 2023, Grube lived with his wife, Alyssa, and their two young daughters, Ensley and Enniseon, in Whitley County, Indiana where he worked for Steel Dynamics in Columbia City.
