= Héctor Santiago (baseball) =

American baseball player (born 1987)

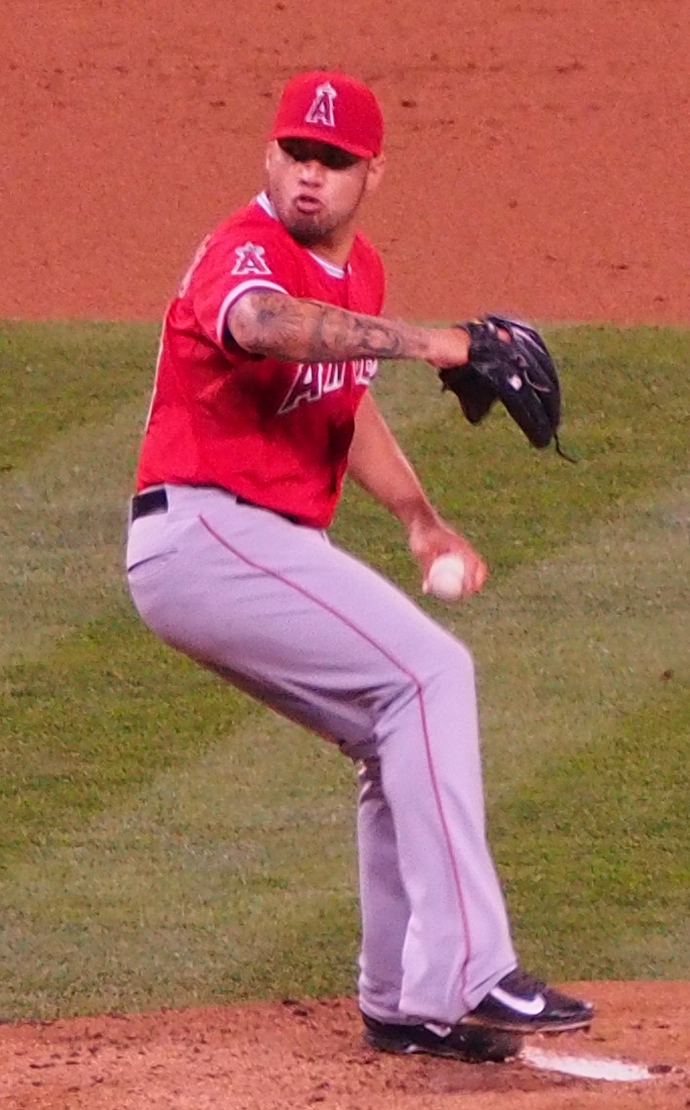
- Santiago with the Los Angeles Angels
- Pitcher
- Born: December 16, 1987 (age 38); Newark, New Jersey, U.S.
- Batted: Right Threw: Left

MLB debut
- July 6, 2011, for the Chicago White Sox

Last MLB appearance
- July 27, 2021, for the Seattle Mariners

MLB statistics
- Win–loss record: 48–51
- Earned run average: 4.12
- Strikeouts: 856
- Stats at Baseball Reference

Teams
- Chicago White Sox (2011–2013); Los Angeles Angels of Anaheim / Los Angeles Angels (2014–2016); Minnesota Twins (2016–2017); Chicago White Sox (2018); New York Mets (2019); Chicago White Sox (2019); Seattle Mariners (2021)

Career highlights and awards
- All-Star (2015)
Medals
Men's baseball
Representing Puerto Rico
World Baseball Classic
Silver medal – second place	2017 Los Angeles	Team

Héctor Felipe Santiago (born December 16, 1987) is an American former professional baseball pitcher. He played in Major League Baseball (MLB) for the Chicago White Sox, Los Angeles Angels of Anaheim, Minnesota Twins, New York Mets, and Seattle Mariners. Santiago also played for the Puerto Rico national baseball team.

He played one year of college baseball at Okaloosa-Walton Community College in Niceville, Florida. He was an All–Star in 2015.

== Amateur career ==
Santiago graduated in 2006 from Bloomfield Tech High School in Essex County, New Jersey. He played one year at Okaloosa-Walton Community College (now Northwest Florida State College). He is of Puerto Rican descent.

== Professional career ==
=== Chicago White Sox (2006–2013) ===
==== Minor leagues ====
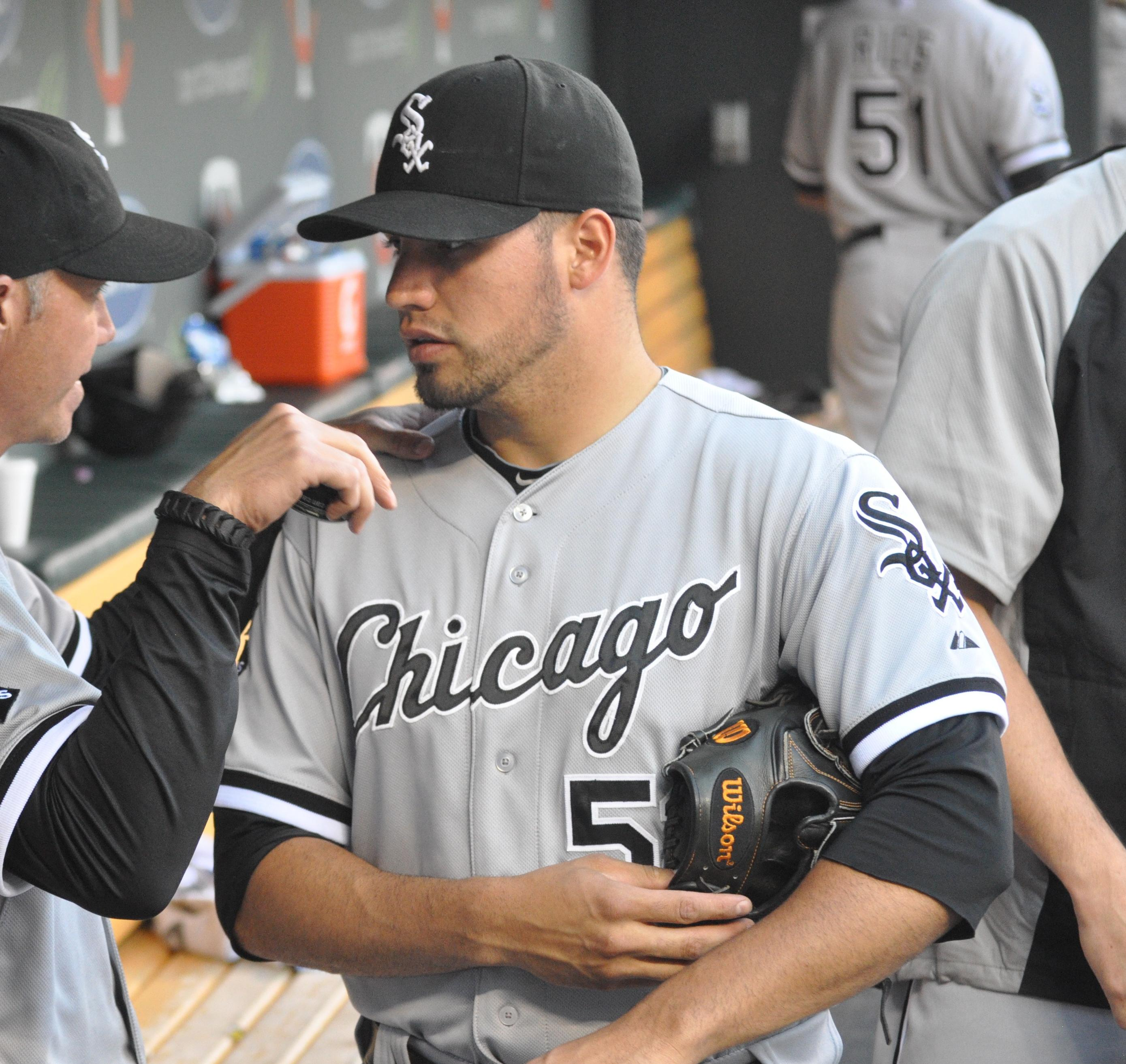
Santiago with the Chicago White Sox in 2012

The Chicago White Sox of Major League Baseball (MLB) drafted Santiago in the 30th round of the 2006 MLB draft, and he signed with the team on May 30, 2007. He made his professional debut with the Rookie-level Bristol White Sox of the Appalachian League that summer, going 1–1 with a 1.65 ERA in 17 relief appearances. While playing for Bristol, Santiago also befriended Nate Jones, and the pair rose through the White Sox's farm system at the same pace.

In 2008, he played for the Single-A Kannapolis Intimidators, recording a 5-1 record and 4.06 ERA in 38 games. For the 2009 season, Santiago played for the High-A Winston-Salem Dash, pitching to a 4-4 record and 3.88 ERA with 66 strikeouts in 58.0 innings of work. He returned to Winston-Salem the following year, registering a 4-5 record and 4.15 ERA with 61 strikeouts in 60 2/3?innings pitched.

==== Major leagues ====
Santiago, who split time with Winston-Salem and the Double-A Birmingham Barons in the first half of 2011, was called up to the major leagues for the first time on June 26, 2011.

Santiago made his MLB debut on July 6, 2011, pitching a perfect ninth inning against the Kansas City Royals. He struck out Eric Hosmer for his first MLB strikeout. On April 7, 2012, Santiago earned his first career save by striking out Elvis Andrus to seal a 4–3 victory for the White Sox. On May 8, Santiago earned his first career win during a 5–3 victory over the Cleveland Indians, pitching one inning yielding two hits and striking out one. He remained the majority of the season in the bullpen, but he started four games. He finished 4-1 in 42 games with 4 saves.

In 2013, Santiago split between the White Sox bullpen and the rotation, finishing with 23 starts while also appearing 11 times out of the bullpen. Although his ERA for the season was 3.56, his record was just 4-9 for the White Sox.

=== Los Angeles Angels of Anaheim / Los Angeles Angels (2014–2016) ===
Santiago was traded to the Los Angeles Angels of Anaheim on December 10, 2013, in a three-team trade involving the Chicago White Sox, the Arizona Diamondbacks, and the Los Angeles Angels. The Angels received Tyler Skaggs along with Santiago, while the White Sox received Adam Eaton and the Diamondbacks received Mark Trumbo, Brandon Jacobs, and A. J. Schugel. In his first season in Anaheim, Santiago was fairly inconsistent, he averaged less than 6 innings per start and for a moment was sent to the bullpen, where he made 6 appearances while also starting 24 times for the Angels. In 127 1/3 innings, Santiago went 6-9 with a 3.75 ERA.

Santiago enjoyed his best season in 2015, setting career highs in wins, innings, strikeouts, and in WHIP. He had the lowest ground ball percentage among major league pitchers (29.9%), and the highest fly ball percentage (53.6%).

Santiago began the 2016 season in the Angels rotation. From April to June, Santiago recorded a record of 4-4 with an ERA of 5.27. However, in the month of July, Santiago allowed just 8 runs in 35.1 innings while posting a 6-0 record. His 2016 stats with Anaheim ended in 22 starts while going 10-4. He issued 57 walks in 120.2 innings.

=== Minnesota Twins (2016–2017) ===
On August 1, 2016, the Los Angeles Angels of Anaheim traded Santiago along with Alan Busenitz to the Minnesota Twins in exchange for Ricky Nolasco, Alex Meyer, and cash. For the Twins in 2016, he was 3-6 with a 5.58 ERA. Pitching for the two teams, he had the lowest line drive percentage allowed (15.9%) of all major league pitchers, the highest fly ball percentage allowed (50.0%), and gave up the highest percentage of hard-hit balls (37.3%).

He spent much of the 2017 season on the disabled list, and finished with a 4-8 record and a 5.63 ERA. He elected free agency on November 2, 2017.

=== Second stint with Chicago White Sox (2018) ===
On February 14, 2018, Santiago signed a minor-league deal with the Chicago White Sox. Santiago's contract was purchased by the White Sox on March 28, and he was assigned to the Opening Day roster. Santiago spent the majority of the season in the White Sox bullpen, logging a 4.41 ERA in 102 innings pitched across 49 appearances.

=== New York Mets (2019) ===
On January 5, 2019, Santiago signed a minor league deal with the New York Mets. He was assigned to the Triple-A Syracuse Mets to begin the season. Santiago was promoted to the major league club on May 20, following an injury to Seth Lugo. Santiago was designated for assignment on June 15 after struggling to a 6.75 ERA in 8 appearances. He elected free agency on June 18.

=== Third stint with Chicago White Sox (2019) ===
As a minor league free agent, Santiago signed a contract with the White Sox on June 21, 2019. He played seven games for Charlotte, going 1–4 with a 5.84 ERA in the process, before he was called up to Chicago on August 6, replacing an injured Manny Bañuelos. On September 24, Santiago struck out eight batters, the most by a White Sox reliever since Brandon McCarthy in 2005. Those strikeouts amounted to little, however, as the Cleveland Indians shut out Chicago 11–0, with Santiago allowing seven runs over four innings. In 11 major league games for the White Sox, Santiago went 0–1 with a 6.66 ERA, striking out 34 batters in 25 2/3 innings.

=== Detroit Tigers (2020) ===
Prior to the 2020 MLB season, Santiago sent out a resume and cover letter to all 30 major league teams, in which he said that he would pitch in whatever position they needed, ending with a note that, "I’ll be the yes man for whoever needs me to be. My career has literally been just like this— ha-ha." This caught the attention of the Detroit Tigers, who signed Santiago to a minor-league contract on January 22, 2020. The contract included an invitation to spring training, which placed him in competition with fellow left-handed relievers Tyler Alexander, Nick Ramirez, and Gregory Soto for a place in the Detroit bullpen. The COVID-19 pandemic's impact on both major and minor league baseball extended the Tigers' bullpen battle into July, and a number of extra relievers attended Comerica Park for the final round of roster cuts that July. Santiago was released from the organization on July 21, before playing a regular season game for the Tigers.

=== Seattle Mariners (2021) ===
Santiago did not garner any more team offers for the remainder of the 2020 season, or in time for 2021 spring training, and he spent the winter playing for Puerto Rico in the 2021 Caribbean Series. On April 30, the Seattle Mariners called Santiago and asked if he could make a start for their Triple-A team, the Tacoma Rainiers, on May 8. He pitched four no-hit innings, striking out seven batters and walking two. On May 27, the Mariners selected his contract and promoted Santiago to the majors, where he was meant to bolster a bullpen that had been depleted by injury and COVID-19.

On June 27, Santiago became the first MLB player ejected from a game as part of new policies banning the controversial "sticky stuff" that pitchers used to enhance their grip. Both Santiago and Mariners manager Scott Servais argued that the substance found on Santiago's glove was a mixture of sweat and rosin, the latter of which was allowed. Santiago appealed the 10-game suspension, which was ultimately upheld, and he was suspended from July 15 to July 27. Only two days after returning from that suspension, Santiago was suspended for an additional 80 games without pay following a positive test for exogenous testosterone, considered by MLB to be a performance-enhancing drug. He told reporters that his doctor in Puerto Rico had suggested that he undergo hormonal replacement therapy for an undisclosed medical condition, but he did not contest the suspension. Santiago made 13 major league appearances in 2021, posting a 1-1 record and a 3.42 ERA while striking out 30 batters in 26 1/3 innings.

=== Acereros de Monclova (2023–present) ===
On November 30, 2022, Santiago signed with the Acereros de Monclova of the Mexican League for the 2023 season. In 9 starts for Monclova, he logged a 3–1 record and 4.84 ERA with 41 strikeouts across 44 2/3 innings pitched.

Santiago did not appear in a game for the Acereros in 2024 or 2025, spending both seasons on the reserve list.

== International career ==
Santiago played for the Puerto Rican national team in the 2017 World Baseball Classic where he won a silver medal.

== Pitching style ==
Santiago throws a wide variety of pitches, although by far his most common is a four-seam fastball in the range of 90–96 mph. His off-speed pitches include a curveball, a slider, a changeup and an occasional cutter. He is also one of the few pitchers in recent years to throw a screwball. Lefties tend to only see fastballs and curveballs, while right-handers see mostly fastballs, changeups, and screwballs.

According to Santiago, "I'm ... mostly on the inner half to right-handers and away to lefties. I try to get it down and in to righties and down and away to lefties, and let them basically get themselves out. How my ball moves is a big part of how I pitch."

== See also ==
- List of Major League Baseball players from Puerto Rico
