= Mike Morin (baseball) =

American baseball player (born 1991)

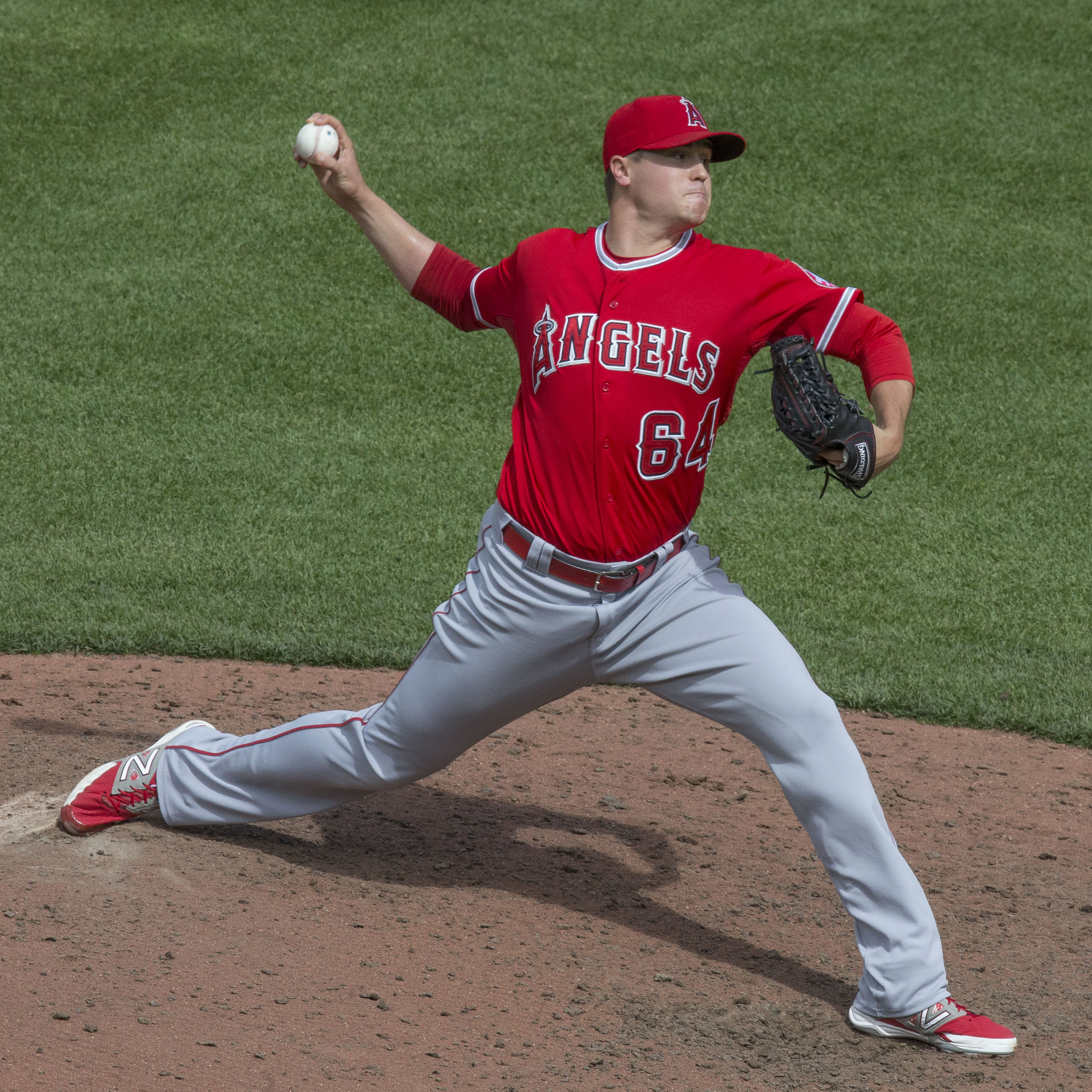
- Morin with the Los Angeles Angels
- Pitcher
- Born: May 3, 1991 (age 35); Andover, Minnesota, U.S.
- Batted: Right Threw: Right

MLB debut
- April 30, 2014, for the Los Angeles Angels

Last MLB appearance
- August 12, 2020, for the Miami Marlins

MLB statistics
- Win–loss record: 12-11
- Earned run average: 4.57
- Strikeouts: 194
- Stats at Baseball Reference

Teams
- Los Angeles Angels of Anaheim / Los Angeles Angels (2014–2017); Kansas City Royals (2017); Seattle Mariners (2018); Minnesota Twins (2019); Philadelphia Phillies (2019); Miami Marlins (2020)

Michael William Morin (/ˈmɔːrɪn/; born May 3, 1991) is an American former professional baseball pitcher. He has previously played in Major League Baseball (MLB) for the Los Angeles Angels, Kansas City Royals, Seattle Mariners, Minnesota Twins, Philadelphia Phillies, and Miami Marlins. The Angels selected Morin in the 13th round of the 2012 Major League Baseball draft, and he made his major league debut in 2014.

== Early life ==
Morin was born in Andover, Minnesota, and grew up in Leawood, Kansas. He is the son of Leatha Scalise Cline and Greg Morin. He was a four-year letterman at Shawnee Mission South High School in Kansas, and was drafted by the Kansas City Royals in the 40th round of the 2009 Major League Baseball draft. He did not sign, and instead attended the University of North Carolina at Chapel Hill.

== College ==
As a freshman at the University of North Carolina at Chapel Hill, Morin made 24 appearances including one start. He recorded a 5–3 win–loss record with a 5.45 ERA, and had 3 saves. After the 2010 season, he played collegiate summer baseball with the Bourne Braves of the Cape Cod Baseball League. As a sophomore in 2011, Morin made 32 appearances including six starts. He became the Tar Heels closer, and recorded 10 saves. In 64 innings of work, he struck out 66 batters, and walked 18, while posting a 4.64 ERA.

While at North Carolina, Morin set the Atlantic Coast Conference’s single-season saves record as a junior in 2012, with 19. In 2012, he was named an All-American by Baseball America.

== Professional career ==
=== Los Angeles Angels ===
The Los Angeles Angels of Anaheim selected Morin in the 13th round, 417th overall pick, of the 2012 Major League Baseball draft. The following season he was an MiLB.com Angels Organization All Star and Angels Minor League Pitcher of the Year, as pitching for two minor league teams he was 3–3 with 23 saves and a 1.93 ERA in 56 games, and struck out 76 batters in 70 innings.

Morin was called up to the majors for the first time on April 27, 2014 and made his debut three days later on April 30 against the Cleveland Indians. He earned his first career win on June 21 against Texas. Morin would remain in the Angels bullpen for the remainder of the season and posted a 4–4 record with a 2.90 ERA in 60 appearances (3rd among American League rookies).

The following season, Morin took a step back following the success from a season prior, posting a 4–2 record with one save and an ERA of 6.37 in 47 games, with 41 strikeouts in 35 1/3 innings.

In 2016, Morin matched his career high of 60 appearances from 2014 while going 2-2 and lowering his ERA to 4.37. In 2017, Morin spent the majority of the season with the Triple–A Salt Lake Bees, pitching in 10 games for the Angels and recording a 6.91 ERA with 10 strikeouts. On September 5, 2017, Morin was designated for assignment by the Angels.

=== Kansas City Royals ===
The Kansas City Royals claimed Morin off of waivers on September 12, 2017. He spent the rest of the season in the majors, pitching in six games for the Royals and logging a 7.94 ERA with six strikeouts.

=== Seattle Mariners ===
Morin was claimed off waivers by the Seattle Mariners on December 8, 2017. On March 14, 2018, Morin was removed from the 40–man roster and sent outright to the Triple–A Tacoma Rainiers. On June 8, the Mariners selected Morin's contract. adding him to their active roster, where he pitched in three games for the team. He was designated for assignment on June 14. Morin was recalled on July 12, but then outrighted off the roster on July 20. He declared free agency on October 2.

=== Minnesota Twins ===
On December 18, 2018, Morin signed a minor league deal with the Minnesota Twins that included an invitation to spring training. Morin began the 2019 season with the Rochester Red Wings, with whom he was 0–1 with a 2.25 ERA and one save in eight games including one start, and was promoted to the major leagues on May 2, 2019. In 23 games for the Twins in 2019 he was 0–0 with one save and a 3.18 ERA.

=== Philadelphia Phillies ===
On July 20, 2019, the Minnesota Twins traded Morin to the Philadelphia Phillies in exchange for cash considerations. In 2019 with the Phillies he was 1–3 with a 5.79 ERA in 29 relief appearances in which he pitched 28.0 innings. He elected free agency on November 4, 2019, after being outrighted off the major league roster.

=== Milwaukee Brewers ===
On January 22, 2020, Morin signed a minor league contract with the Milwaukee Brewers. On July 23, the Brewers selected Morin's contract, adding him to their Opening Day roster for the truncated season. He did not appear in a game for the Brewers, and was designated for assignment following Eric Lauer's activation from the COVID-19-injured list on July 26.

=== Miami Marlins ===
On July 28, 2020, Morin was claimed off waivers by the Miami Marlins. He made 3 scoreless appearances for Miami, striking out 2 batters in 4 innings of work. On October 29, Morin was removed from the 40-man roster and sent outright to the Triple-A Wichita Wind Surge.

=== Kane County Cougars ===
On August 4, 2022, Morin signed with the Kane County Cougars of the American Association of Professional Baseball. He appeared in 12 games and threw 13 2/3 innings with a 5.27 ERA and 7 strikeouts. Morin was released by the Cougars on September 13.

=== Guerreros de Oaxaca ===
On January 20, 2023, Morin signed a minor league contract with the Chicago White Sox organization. Morin was released by Chicago prior to the start of the season on March 27.

On May 12, 2023, Morin signed with the Guerreros de Oaxaca of the Mexican League. In 17 games for Oaxaca, he registered a 2.89 ERA with 26 strikeouts and 8 saves in 18 2/3 innings of work.

=== Atlanta Braves ===
On July 19, 2023, Morin signed a minor league contract with the Atlanta Braves. In 16 games for the Triple–A Gwinnett Stripers, he posted a 5.09 ERA with 16 strikeouts across 17 2/3 innings pitched. Morin elected free agency following the season on November 6.

=== Tohoku Rakuten Golden Eagles ===
On June 8, 2024, Morin participated in a workout for the Tohoku Rakuten Golden Eagles of Nippon Professional Baseball; however, he was ultimately not offered a contract.
