= Garrett Richards =

American baseball player (born 1988)

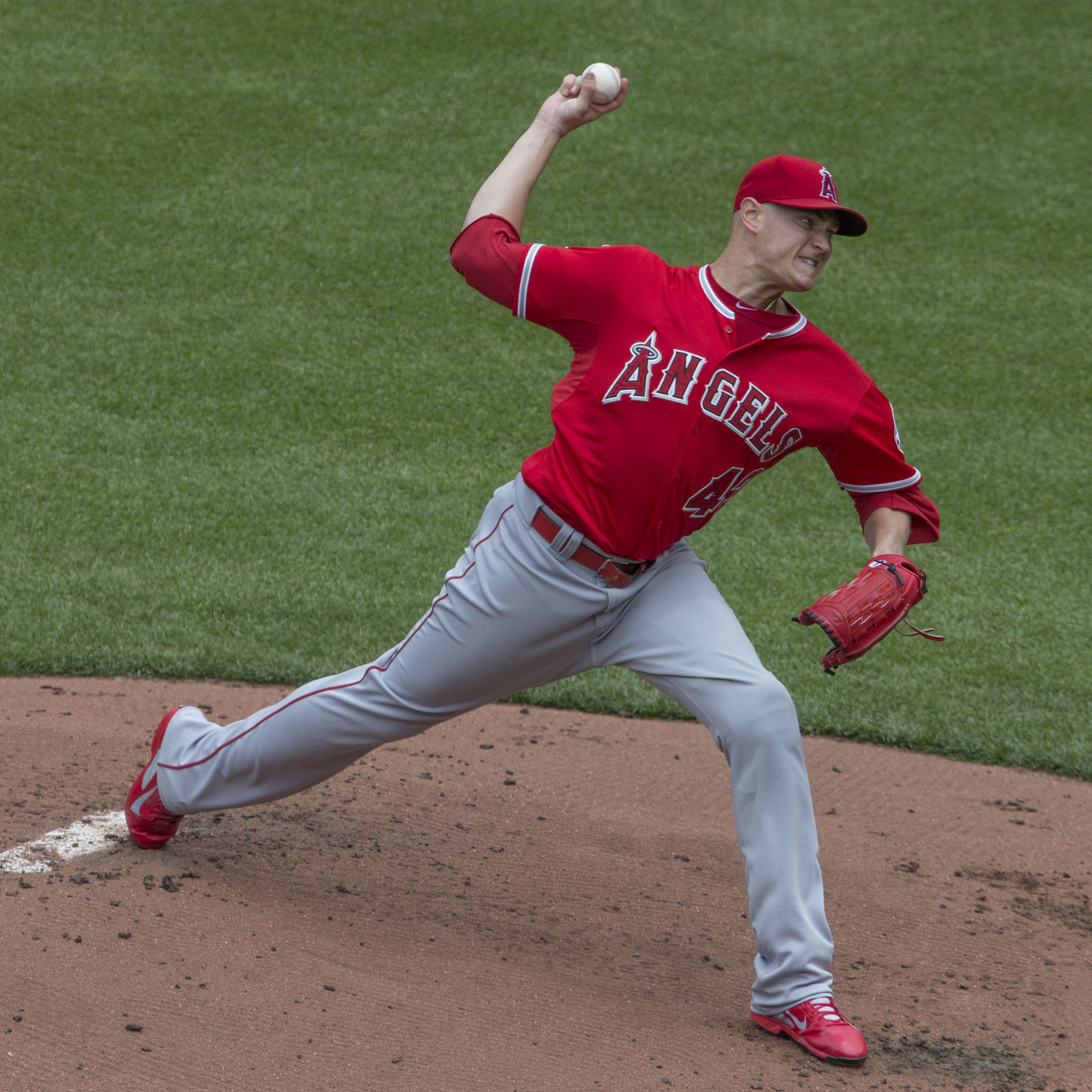
- Richards with the Los Angeles Angels in 2015
- Pitcher
- Born: May 27, 1988 (age 38); Riverside, California, U.S.
- Batted: Right Threw: Right

MLB debut
- August 10, 2011, for the Los Angeles Angels

Last MLB appearance
- August 16, 2022, for the Texas Rangers

MLB statistics
- Win–loss record: 55–50
- Earned run average: 3.87
- Strikeouts: 853
- Stats at Baseball Reference

Teams
- Los Angeles Angels of Anaheim / Los Angeles Angels (2011–2018); San Diego Padres (2019–2020); Boston Red Sox (2021); Texas Rangers (2022)

Garrett Thomas Richards (born May 27, 1988) is an American former professional baseball pitcher. He played in Major League Baseball (MLB) for the Los Angeles Angels, San Diego Padres, Boston Red Sox, and Texas Rangers.

== Amateur career ==
Richards attended Edmond Memorial High School in Edmond, Oklahoma, where he was a four-year letterman. His best season was in 2005, where he pitched to a 8–5 win–loss record with a 2.97 earned run average (ERA) and 106 strikeouts. The team won regional championships in 2005 and 2006.

Undrafted out of high school, Richards attended the University of Oklahoma and played college baseball for the Oklahoma Sooners. In 2007, his freshman year, he recorded nine saves, the fourth-most in team history. That summer, he played with the Cotuit Kettleers of the Cape Cod Baseball League. In 2008, he made his first career collegiate start. He played the summer with the Mat-Su Miners of the Alaska Baseball League. As a full-time starter in 2009, Richards led the team in strikeouts (85) and wins (9).

== Professional career ==
=== Los Angeles Angels of Anaheim / Los Angeles Angels ===
==== Minor Leagues ====
The Los Angeles Angels of Anaheim selected Richards with the 42nd overall selection in the 2009 Major League Baseball draft. He signed with the Angels, receiving a $802,800 signing bonus. He made his professional debut with Rookie level Orem, going 3–1 with a 1.53 ERA and a 7.50 strikeout to walk ratio. He started 2010 with Single-A Cedar Rapids, going 8–4 in 19 starts, earning a Midwest League All-Star selection. However, his walk total (34) did significantly rise in comparison to his strikeout total (108). He earned a mid-season promotion to High-A Rancho Cucamonga, going 4–1 with a 3.89 ERA in seven starts. He started 2011 with Double-A Arkansas, going 12–2 with a 3.06 ERA and three complete games in 21 starts, earning a Texas League All-Star selection.

==== Major leagues ====
On August 10, 2011, Richards was called up to take the rotation spot of Joel Piñeiro, filling in for the suspended Jered Weaver. His major league debut did not go well, as Richards took the loss to the New York Yankees, giving up 6 earned runs in 5 innings pitched. His ERA after the game was a high 10.80. During his call-up in 2011, he pitched in seven games, starting three, and went 0–2 with a 5.79 ERA.

In 10 starts during 2012 for the Angels Triple-A affiliate, the Salt Lake Bees, Richards was 5–2 with a 4.31 ERA, striking out 48 while walking 29. He was called up by the Angels on June 5, 2012 to replace Jered Weaver who was placed in the 15-day disabled list and won his first major league game against the Seattle Mariners, pitching seven strong innings and allowing only one earned run. Making 30 appearances (9 starts) in 2012, Richards finished with a 4–3 record and a 4.69 ERA.

In 2013, Richards made 47 appearances (17 starts) with a 7–8 record and a 4.16 ERA.

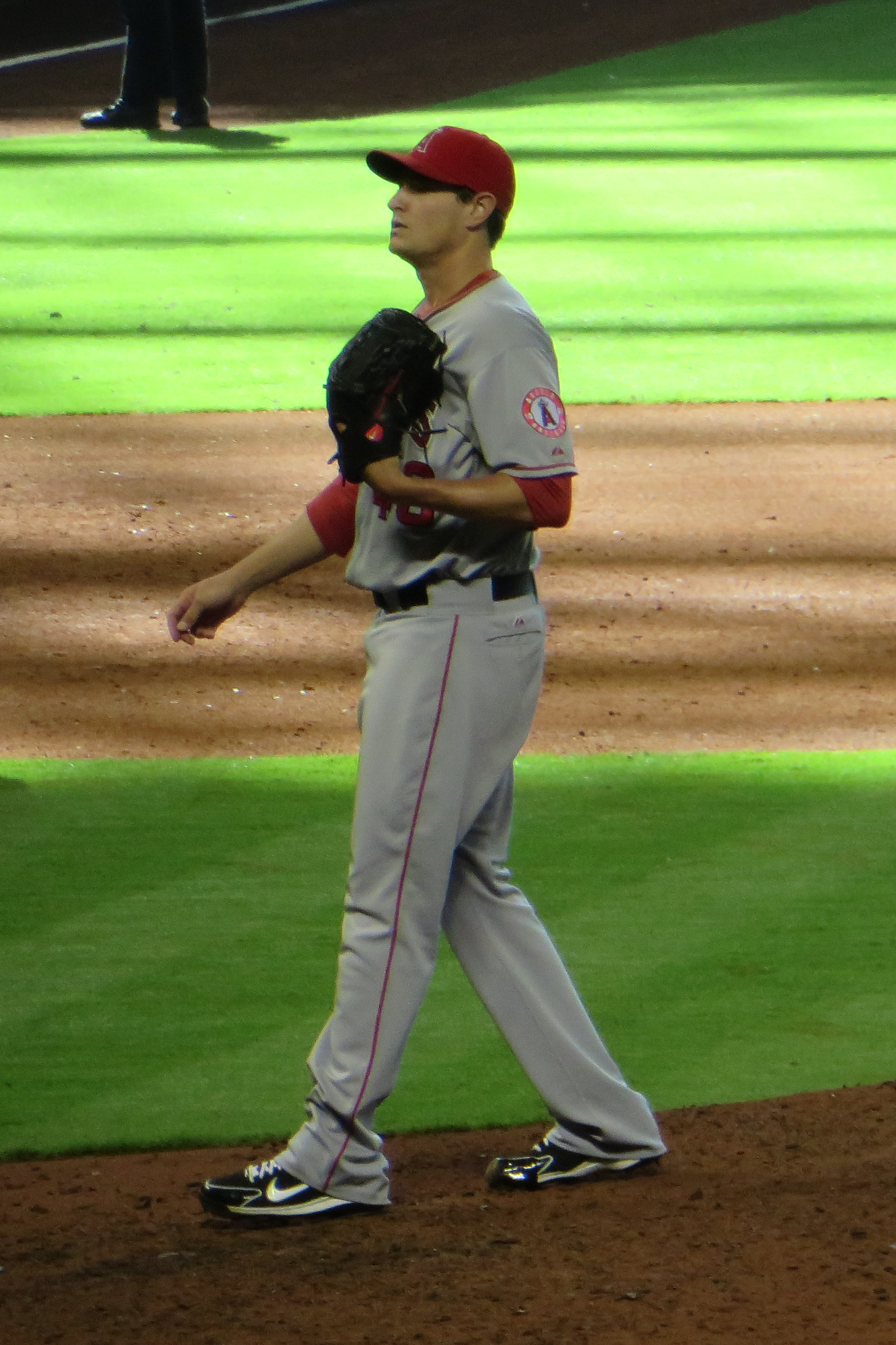
Richards in 2013

On June 4, 2014, Richards pitched an immaculate inning against the Houston Astros, striking out Jon Singleton, Matt Dominguez, and Chris Carter in order on nine pitches. In the week prior to the 2014 All-Star Game, Richards was selected as a final vote nominee, finishing second in voting to Chris Sale of the Chicago White Sox. On August 4, 2014, Richards pitched his first career shutout, allowing only five hits and no runs over nine innings, against the L.A. Dodgers.

On August 20, 2014, Richards suffered a knee injury while attempting to complete a double play at first base at Fenway Park during a game against the Boston Red Sox. He had to be carted off the field. Richards was diagnosed with a torn patellar tendon in his left knee and it prematurely ended his 2014 season. He underwent surgery on August 22. The rehabilitation from the injury required between six and nine months. He made 26 starts in 2014, finishing 13–4 with a 2.61 ERA but threw an MLB-leading 22 wild pitches.

On April 19, 2015, Richards was activated from the disabled list, and made his first start of the season. He made 32 starts and again led MLB with wild pitches thrown, totaling 17 wild pitches. His record was 15–12 with a 3.65 ERA.

Richards' 2016 season became short-lived as he made only 6 starts with a 1–3 record and a 2.34 ERA. On May 6, 2016, Richards was diagnosed with a torn ligament in his pitching elbow. The injury required surgery, meaning that Richards would take no further part in baseball activities for the remainder of the 2016 season. He did not get Tommy John surgery, instead he opted for a newer biometrics surgery. Richards' 2017 was also cut short due to injury, only appearing in six starts.

On July 10, 2018, Richards left the game early against the Seattle Mariners with "right forearm irritation". The next day, the MRI revealed he had a damaged ulnar collateral ligament in his pitching elbow. He underwent Tommy John surgery, ending his 2018 season and delaying his readiness in the following season. He ended the 2018 season with a record of 5–4 and a 3.66 ERA, while leading the American League with 15 wild pitches.

=== San Diego Padres ===
On December 7, 2018, Richards signed a two-year contract with the San Diego Padres. He appeared in his first game for the Padres on September 16, 2019. With the 2019 Padres, Richards appeared in three games, all starts, accruing an 0–1 record with an 8.31 ERA. He began the 2020 season in the rotation, but towards the end of the season was moved to the bullpen, finishing with a 2–2 record in 14 games (10 starts) with a 4.03 ERA. He made four appearances out of the bullpen during the playoffs, allowing two runs in 2 2/3 innings. Richards became a free agent on October 28, 2020.

=== Boston Red Sox ===
On February 3, 2021, Richards officially signed a one-year, $10 million contract with the Boston Red Sox. He made his Red Sox debut on April 4, taking the loss in a start against the Baltimore Orioles after allowing six runs on seven hits in two innings. On June 16, Richards notched his first MLB career hit, an RBI double off of Atlanta Braves starter Ian Anderson. In late June, he was one of several pitchers who complained about sudden rule changes regarding foreign substances. After compiling a 6–7 record in 22 starts with a 5.22 ERA, he was moved to Boston's bullpen on August 11. This move occurred days before the return of starter Chris Sale, who made his first appearance of the season on August 14. Richards made six relief appearances through the end of August, allowing only a single run in 10 1/3 innings. Overall during the regular season, Richards made 40 appearances (22 starts) while compiling a 7–8 record with 4.87 ERA and three saves; he struck out 115 batters in 136 2/3 innings. He made one postseason appearance, pitching 1/3 of an inning against the Tampa Bay Rays in the Division Series. On November 7, the team declined to exercise their $10 million option on Richards for 2022, making him a free agent.

=== Texas Rangers ===
On March 20, 2022, Richards officially signed a one-year, $4.5 million contract with the Texas Rangers. In 32 appearances for the Rangers, he posted a 1-1 record and 5.27 ERA with 36 strikeouts across 42 2/3 innings pitched. On August 17, Richards was designated for assignment by Texas. He cleared waivers and became a free agent on August 23.

== Pitching style ==
Richards leads with four-seam and two-seam fastballs at mid-90s mph (tops out at 99) with running action. He also has a changeup to lefties, a slider to righties, and a curveball. Joe Girardi, known for serving as manager of the New York Yankees, noted that Richards' fastball is exceptional because "its movement... is not consistent". In 2018, he led MLB in average spin rate for sliders (2919 rpm) and curveballs (3253 rpm).
