= 2011 Oakland Athletics season =

2011 Oakland Athletics
- League: American League
- Division: West
- Ballpark: Overstock.com Coliseum
- City: Oakland, California, United States
- Record: 74–88 (.457)
- Divisional place: 3rd
- Owners: Lewis Wolff
- General managers: Billy Beane
- Managers: Bob Geren (through 6/9), Bob Melvin (Interim)
- Television: Comcast SportsNet California (Glen Kuiper, Ray Fosse)
- Radio: KGMZ (Ken Korach, Vince Cotroneo, Ray Fosse)

The Oakland Athletics' 2011 season was the 44th for the franchise in the Bay Area, as well as the 111th in club history. The team was competing for the American League West title after a 4-year absence from playoff contention, with a payroll just above $77 million.

== Off-season/spring training ==
=== Coaching changes ===
Coach	Former	Since	New	Former Position
Bench	Tye Waller	2009	Joel Skinner	Managed AA-Akron Aeros (CLE)
Bullpen	Ron Romanick	2008	Rick Rodriguez	Pitching coach for Sacramento
Hitting	Jim Skaalen	2009	Gerald Perry	Hitting coach for AAA-Pawtucket Red Sox (BOS)
Pitching	Curt Young	2004	Ron Romanick	3 seasons as Athletics' bullpen coach
1st Base	Todd Steverson	2009	Tye Waller	2 seasons as Athletics' bench coach

Young declined a 2-year contract offer and became Boston's pitching coach. Steverson becomes hitting coach for Sacramento.

=== Transactions ===
- April 27, C Kurt Suzuki moved to paternity list and recalled C Josh Donaldson.
- April 25, Activated P Michael Wuertz and optioned P Bobby Cramer.
- April 18, Traded P Daniel Farquhar to Toronto for P David Purcey. Transferred P Rich Harden to 60-Day DL.
- April 6, Recalled P Tyson Ross from Sacramento.
- March 30, Placed IF Adam Rosales on 60-Day DL. Purchased contract and recalled IF Andy LaRoche.
- January 24, Traded P Clayton Mortensen to Colorado for minor league P Ethan Hollingsworth. Signed free agent IF Andy LaRoche to a minor league deal with an invite to big league camp.
- January 19, Signed free agent P Brian Fuentes to a two-year, $10.5M deal and third-year club option. DFA'd IF Steven Tolleson.
- January 18, Signed free agent P Grant Balfour to a two-year, $8.1M deal and third-year club option. DFA'd P Clayton Mortensen. Avoid arbitration with P Dallas Braden (1yr/$3.35M), OF Conor Jackson (1yr/$3.2M), 3B Kevin Kouzmanoff (1yr/$4.75M), OF Josh Willingham (1yr/$6M).
- January 8, Acquired P Guillermo Moscoso from Texas for minor league P Ryan Kelly (acquired from Pittsburgh for minor league UT Corey Wimberly in December). DFA'd P Philip Humber, claimed by Chicago.
- December 21, Signed free agent P Rich Harden to a one-year, $1.5M deal.
- December 17, Claimed P Philip Humber off waivers from Kansas City.
- December 16, Traded P Henry Rodríguez and OF Corey Brown to Washington for OF Josh Willingham.
- December 14, Signed free agent DH Hideki Matsui to a one-year, $4.25M deal.
- December 13, Signed free agent P Brandon McCarthy to a one-year, $1M deal. Avoided arbitration with P Joey Devine (1yr/$850k)
- December 3, Avoided arbitration with OF Ryan Sweeney (1yr/$1.4M)
- December 2, Non-tendered OF Travis Buck (Cleveland), DH Jack Cust (Seattle) and IF Edwin Encarnación (Toronto).
- November 19, Added OF Corey Brown, IF Adrian Cardenas, IF Sean Doolittle, P Trystan Magnuson, and OF Michael Taylor to 40-man roster.
- November 17, Traded OF Rajai Davis to Toronto for minor league P Trystan Magnuson and P Daniel Farquhar.
- November 12, Claimed IF Edwin Encarnación off waivers from Toronto.
- November 10, Traded P Vin Mazzaro and minor league P Justin Marks to Kansas City for OF David DeJesus.
- November 8, Won bid for NPB pitcher Hisashi Iwakuma, but were not able to finalize a deal.
- November 3, Picked up club options on OF Coco Crisp ($5.75M) and IF Mark Ellis ($6M). Declined $12.5M option on IF Eric Chavez (New York), making him a free agent for 1st time in his career.
- November 2, Outrighted P Boof Bonser and OF Matt Carson to AAA. Resigned Carson to a minor-league contract. Bonser (New York) elected to become a free agent. P Justin James claimed off waivers by Milwaukee. P Justin Duchscherer and P Ben Sheets become free agents.
- October 30, Outrighted OF Gabe Gross, UT Jeff Larish, P Jon Meloan, and P Justin Souza to AAA. Gross (Seattle) and Larish (Philadelphia) elected to become free agents.
- October 7, Outrighted OF Jeremy Hermida, P Brad Kilby and P Ross Wolf to AAA. Hermida (Cincinnati) and Wolf (Houston) elected to become free agents.
- October 5, Released Cedrick Bowers.
- October 4, Released IF Akinori Iwamura (Tohoku Rakuten).

== Changes in apparel ==
The A's were known for sporting white jerseys at home and greys for away games. On top of that, the A's wore a black and a green alternate jersey. During the 2011 season, they added a new style. The A's started wearing a gold alternate home jersey to their apparel. Manager Billy Beane referred to the look as "the Canary yellow" jerseys. A's relief pitcher Jerry Blevins said, "It might be hard not to notice us now".

=== Season standings ===
==== American League West ====
AL West
Team	W	L	Pct.	GB	Home	Road
Texas Rangers	96	66	.593	—	52‍–‍29	44‍–‍37
Los Angeles Angels of Anaheim	86	76	.531	10	45‍–‍36	41‍–‍40
Oakland Athletics	74	88	.457	22	43‍–‍38	31‍–‍50
Seattle Mariners	67	95	.414	29	39‍–‍45	28‍–‍50

==== American League Wild Card ====
Division winners
Team	W	L	Pct.
New York Yankees	97	65	.599
Texas Rangers	96	66	.593
Detroit Tigers	95	67	.586

Wild Card team (Top team qualifies for postseason)
Team	W	L	Pct.	GB
Tampa Bay Rays	91	71	.562	—
Boston Red Sox	90	72	.556	1
Los Angeles Angels of Anaheim	86	76	.531	5
Toronto Blue Jays	81	81	.500	10
Cleveland Indians	80	82	.494	11
Chicago White Sox	79	83	.488	12
Oakland Athletics	74	88	.457	17
Kansas City Royals	71	91	.438	20
Baltimore Orioles	69	93	.426	22
Seattle Mariners	67	95	.414	24
Minnesota Twins	63	99	.389	28

== Roster ==
2011 Oakland Athletics
**Roster**
**Pitchers**: 49 Brett Anderson; 40 Andrew Bailey; 50 Grant Balfour; 61 Bruce Billings; 13 Jerry Blevins; 51 Dallas Braden; 56 Craig Breslow; 53 Trevor Cahill; 67 Andrew Carignan; 26 Bobby Cramer; 60 Fautino de los Santos; 33 Joey Devine; 57 Brian Fuentes; 65 Graham Godfrey; 47 Gio González; 18 Rich Harden; 64 Trystan Magnuson; 32 Brandon McCarthy; 52 Guillermo Moscoso; 59 Jordan Norberto; 88 Josh Outman; 29 David Purcey; 66 Tyson Ross; 62 Neil Wagner; 48 Michael Wuertz; 31 Brad Ziegler	**Catchers**: 11 Landon Powell; 26 Anthony Recker; 8 Kurt Suzuki; **Infielders**: 31 Brandon Allen; 10 Daric Barton; 22 Chris Carter; 14 Mark Ellis; 28 Conor Jackson; 5 Kevin Kouzmanoff; 21 Andy LaRoche; 2 Cliff Pennington; 7 Adam Rosales; 29 Scott Sizemore; 36 Eric Sogard; 19 Jemile Weeks	**Outfielders**: 4 Coco Crisp; 12 David DeJesus; 55 Hideki Matsui; 58 Jai Miller; 15 Ryan Sweeney; 23 Michael Taylor; 16 Josh Willingham	**Manager**: 17 Bob Geren; 6 Bob Melvin; **Coaches**: 3 Mike Gallego (third base); 39 Gerald Perry (hitting); 41 Rick Rodriguez (bullpen); 37 Ron Romanick (pitching); 38 Joel Skinner (bench); 46 Tye Waller (first base)

=== Game log ===
Legend
	Athletics win
	Athletics loss
	Postponement
**Bold**	Athletics team member

2011 game log
April (13–14)

#	Date	Opponent	Score	Win	Loss	Save	Attendance	Record
1	April 1	Mariners	2–6	Hernández (1–0)	**Breslow** (0–1)		36,067	0–1
2	April 2	Mariners	2–5	Ray (1–0)	**Fuentes** (0–1)	League (1)	15,088	0–2
3	April 3	Mariners	7–1	**Gonzalez** (1–0)	Fister (0–1)		22,292	1–2
4	April 5	@ Blue Jays	6–7 (10)	Frasor (1–0)	**Balfour** (0–1)		11,077	1–3
5	April 6	@ Blue Jays	3–5	Litsch (1–0)	**Braden** (0–1)	Rauch (1)	11,684	1–4
6	April 7	@ Blue Jays	2–1	**Cahill** (1–0)	Frasor (1–1)	**Fuentes** (1)	19,528	2–4
7	April 8	@ Twins	1–2	Pavano (1–1)	**Anderson** (0–1)	Nathan (3)	40,714	2–5
8	April 9	@ Twins	1–0	**Gonzalez** (2–0)	Blackburn (1–1)	**Fuentes** (2)	39,936	3–5
9	April 10	@ Twins	5–3	**McCarthy** (1–0)	Baker (0–2)	**Fuentes** (3)	38,484	4–5
10	April 11	@ White Sox	2–1 (10)	**Ross** (1–0)	Crain (0–1)	**Fuentes** (4)	20,057	5–5
11	April 12	@ White Sox	5–6 (10)	Sale (2–0)	**Cramer** (0–1)		18,020	5–6
12	April 13	@ White Sox	7–4 (10)	**Balfour** (1–1)	Thornton (0–2)	**Fuentes** (5)	16,523	6–6
13	April 14	Tigers	0–3	Coke (1–2)	**Ross** (1–1)	Valverde (3)	11,129	6–7
14	April 15	Tigers	4–8 (10)	Villarreal (1–0)	**Fuentes** 0–2		21,853	6–8
15	April 16	Tigers	6–2	**Braden** (1–1)	Verlander (1–2)		16,265	7–8
16	April 17	Tigers	5–1	**Cahill** (2–0)	Penny (0–2)		16,460	8–8
17	April 19	Red Sox	5–0	**Anderson** (1–1)	Lackey (1–2)		25,230	9–8
18	April 20	Red Sox	3–5	Buchholz (1–2)	**Gonzalez** (2–1)	Papelbon (3)	29,045	9–9
19	April 21	@ Mariners	0–1	Hernández (2–2)	**McCarthy** (1–1)	League (4)	12,770	9–10
20	April 22	@ Mariners	0–4	Pineda (3–1)	**Ross** (1–2)	League (5)	17,798	9–11
21	April 23	@ Mariners	9–1	**Cahill** (3–0)	Vargas (0–2)		25,355	10–11
22	April 24	@ Mariners	5–2	**Anderson** (2–1)	Laffey (0–1)	**Fuentes** (6)	16,530	11–11
23	April 25	@ Angels	0–5	Weaver (6–0)	**Gonzalez** (2–2)		37,115	11–12
24	April 26	@ Angels	3–8	Chatwood (2–1)	**McCarthy** (1–2)		37,228	11–13
25	April 27	@ Angels	2–1 (10)	**Fuentes** (1–2)	Walden (0–1)	**Ziegler** (1)	37,247	12–13
26	April 29	Rangers	3–1	**Cahill** (4–0)	Wilson (3–1)	**Fuentes** (7)	17,226	13–13
27	April 30	Rangers	2–11	Lewis (2–3)	**Anderson** (2–2)		27,285	13–14

May (14–15)

#	Date	Opponent	Score	Win	Loss	Save	Attendance	Record
28	May 1	Rangers	7–2	**Gonzalez** (3–2)	Harrison (3–3)		15,178	14–14
29	May 2	Rangers	5–4 (10)	**Balfour** (2–1)	Oliver (1–3)		9,193	15–14
30	May 3	Indians	1–4	Carmona (3–3)	**Fuentes** (1–3)	C. Perez (8)	10,135	15–15
31	May 4	Indians	3–1	**Cahill** (5–0)	Tomlin (4–1)	**Balfour** (1)	13,872	16–15
32	May 5	Indians	3–4 (12)	Durbin (2–1)	**Breslow** (0–2)	C. Perez (9)	14,353	16–16
33	May 6	@ Royals	3–2	**Gonzalez** (4–2)	O'Sullivan (1–2)	**Fuentes** (8)	30,690	17–16
34	May 7	@ Royals	3–4	Soria (2–0)	**McCarthy** (1–3)		25,828	17–17
35	May 8	@ Royals	5–2	**Ross** (2–2)	Francis (0–4)	**Fuentes** (9)	22,435	18–17
36	May 9	@ Rangers	7–2	**Cahill** (6–0)	Wilson (4–2)		24,375	19–17
37	May 10	@ Rangers	2–7	Lewis (3–4)	**Anderson** (2–3)		31,655	19–18
	May 11	@ Rangers	Postponed (rain); Makeup: July 7					
38	May 13	White Sox	3–4	Humber (3–3)	**McCarthy** (1–4)	Santos (4)	12,690	19–19
39	May 14	White Sox	6–2	**Ross** (3–2)	Floyd (4–3)		17,291	20–19
40	May 15	White Sox	3–4	Buehrle (3–3)	**Cahill** (6–1)	Santos (5)	19,018	20–20
41	May 16	Angels	5–4 (10)	**Balfour** (3–1)	Rodney (2–2)		11,061	21–20
42	May 17	Angels	14–0	**Gonzalez** (5–2)	Chatwood (2–2)		12,190	22–20
43	May 18	Twins	3–4 (10)	Nathan (1–1)	**Fuentes** (1–4)	Capps (7)	15,355	22–21
44	May 19	Twins	1–11	Blackburn (3–4)	**Ross** (3–3)		22,320	22–22
45	May 20	@ Giants	1–2 (10)	López (2–0)	**Fuentes** (1–5)		42,224	22–23
46	May 21	@ Giants	0–3	Lincecum (4–4)	**Anderson** (2–4)		42,152	22–24
47	May 22	@ Giants	4–5 (11)	Romo (2–0)	**Fuentes** (1–6)		42,288	22–25
48	May 23	@ Angels	1–4	Downs (2–1)	**Fuentes** (1–7)	Walden (9)	36,215	22–26
49	May 24	@ Angels	6–1	**Moscoso** (1–0)	Haren (4–3)		39,117	23–26
50	May 25	@ Angels	1–4	Santana (3–4)	**Cahill** (6–2)	Walden (10)	40,253	23–27
51	May 26	@ Angels	4–3	**Anderson** (3–4)	Piñeiro (2–1)		33,412	24–27
52	May 27	Orioles	6–2	**Ziegler** (1–0)	Simón (1–1)		12,110	25–27
53	May 28	Orioles	4–2	**Outman** (1–0)	Bergesen (1–6)	**Fuentes** (10)	23,795	26–27
54	May 29	Orioles	6–4	**Moscoso** (2–0)	Britton (5–3)	**Fuentes** (11)	15,373	27–27
55	May 30	Yankees	0–5	Colón (3–3)	**Cahill** (6–3)		35,067	27–28
56	May 31	Yankees	3–10	García (3–4)	**Anderson** (3–5)		22,581	27–29

June (9–17)

#	Date	Opponent	Score	Win	Loss	Save	Attendance	Record
57	June 1	Yankees	2–4	Burnett (6–3)	**Gonzalez** (5–3)	Rivera (14)	25,469	27–30
58	June 3	@ Red Sox	6–8	Jenks (2–2)	**Devine** (0–1)		37,808	27–31
59	June 4	@ Red Sox	8–9 (14)	Aceves (3–1)	**Moscoso** (2–1)		37,485	27–32
60	June 5	@ Red Sox	3–6	Lackey (3–5)	**Anderson** (3–6)	Bard (1)	37,796	27–33
61	June 6	@ Orioles	2–4	Matusz (1–0)	**Gonzalez** (5–4)	Gregg (11)	10,556	27–34
62	June 7	@ Orioles	0–4	Jakubauskas (1–0)	**Moscoso** (2–2)		13,652	27–35
63	June 8	@ Orioles	2–3	Britton (6–4)	**Outman** (1–1)	Gregg (12)	11,760	27–36
64	June 9	@ White Sox	4–9	Buehrle (6–4)	**Cahill** (6–4)		22,170	27–37
65	June 10	@ White Sox	7–5	**Balfour** (4–1)	Santos (2–3)	**Bailey** (1)	20,166	28–37
66	June 11	@ White Sox	2–3	Danks (2–8)	**Gonzalez** (5–5)	Crain (1)	24,391	28–38
67	June 12	@ White Sox	4–5	Humber (6–3)	**Moscoso** (2–3)	Santos (12)	22,144	28–39
68	June 14	Royals	4–7	Duffy (1–2)	**Cahill** (6–5)	**Soria** (10)	11,439	28–40
69	June 15	Royals	2–1	**Outman** (2–1)	Hochevar (4–7)	**Bailey** (2)	16,392	29–40
70	June 16	Royals	8–4	**Gonzalez** (6–5)	Francis (3–7)		11,775	30–40
71	June 17	Giants	5–2	**Godfrey** (1–0)	Lincecum (5–6)	**Bailey** (3)	36,067	31–40
72	June 18	Giants	4–2	**Ziegler** (2–0)	Sánchez (4–5)	**Bailey** (4)	36,067	32–40
73	June 19	Giants	2–1	**Cahill** (7–5)	Affeldt (1–1)	**Fuentes** (12)	36,067	33–40
74	June 21	@ Mets	7–3	**Outman** (3–1)	Gee (7–1)	**Balfour** (2)	37,019	34–40
75	June 22	@ Mets	2–3 (13)	Parnell (2–1)	**Ziegler** (2–1)		38,813	34–41
76	June 23	@ Mets	1–4	Capuano (6–7)	**Godfrey** (1–1)	Rodríguez (20)	30,168	34–42
77	June 24	@ Phillies	0–1	Stutes (3–0)	**Fuentes** (1–8)		45,685	34–43
78	June 25	@ Phillies	4–1	**Cahill** (8–5)	Hamels (9–4)	Bailey (5)	45,785	35–43
79	June 26	@ Phillies	1–3	Halladay (10–3)	**Outman** (3–2)		45,863	35–44
80	June 28	Marlins	1–0	**Gonzalez** (7–5)	Vázquez (4–8)	**Bailey** (6)	12,124	36–44
81	June 29	Marlins	0–3	Nolasco (5–4)	**Moscoso** (2–4)		17,006	36–45
82	June 30	Marlins	4–5	Volstad (4–7)	**Cahill** (8–6)	Núñez (22)	18,395	36–46

July (13–13)

#	Date	Opponent	Score	Win	Loss	Save	Attendance	Record
83	July 1	Diamondbacks	5–4	**Harden** (1–0)	Collmenter (4–5)	**Bailey** (7)	12,216	37–46
84	July 2	Diamondbacks	2–4	Saunders (5–7)	**Outman** (3–9)	Hernandez (3)	30,338	37–47
85	July 3	Diamondbacks	7–2	**Gonzalez** (8–5)	Kennedy (8–3)		13,822	38–47
86	July 4	Mariners	1–2	Pineda (8–5)	**McCarthy** (1–5)	League (23)	15,566	38–48
87	July 5	Mariners	2–4 (10)	League (1–4)	**Bailey** (0–1)	Wright (1)	11,153	38–49
88	July 6	Mariners	2–0	**Moscoso** (3–4)	Vargas (6–6)	**Bailey** (8)	19,491	39–49
89	July 7	@ Rangers	0–6	Holland (7–4)	**Harden** (1–1)		35,041	39–50
90	July 8	@ Rangers	5–8	Wilson (9–3)	**Gonzalez** (8–6)		37,858	39–51
91	July 9	@ Rangers	6–7	Oliver (2–5)	**Bailey** (0–2)		34,066	39–52
92	July 10	@ Rangers	0–2	Harrison (7–7)	**Cahill** (8–7)	Feliz (18)	33,834	39–53
**All-Star Break**
93	July 15	Angels	5–3	**McCarthy** (2–5)	Haren (10–6)	**Bailey** (9)	18,470	40–53
94	July 16	Angels	2–4	Weaver (12–4)	**Cahill** (8–8)	Walden (21)		40–54
95	July 16	Angels	4–3 (10)	**Ziegler** (3–1)	Thompson (1–3)		27,379	41–54
96	July 17	Angels	9–1	**Gonzalez** (9–6)	Piñeiro (5–4)		26,115	42–54
97	July 19	@ Tigers	3–8	Porcello (9–6)	**Moscoso** (3–5)		31,980	42–55
98	July 20	@ Tigers	7–5	**Devine** (1–1)	Purcey (1–2)	**Bailey** (10)	31,975	43–55
99	July 22	@ Yankees	7–17	Noesí (2–0)	**Cahill** (8–9)		46,921	43–56
100	July 23	@ Yankees	4–3	**Harden** (2–1)	Burnett (8–8)	**Bailey** (11)	46,188	44–56
101	July 24	@ Yankees	5–7	Colón (7–6)	**Gonzalez** (9–7)	Rivera (25)	45,586	44–57
102	July 25	Rays	7–5	**Fuentes** (2–8)	Howell (2–2)	**Bailey** (12)	11,053	45–57
103	July 26	Rays	6–1	**McCarthy** (3–5)	Price (9–9)		12,166	46–57
104	July 27	Rays	13–4	**Cahill** (9–9)	Shields (9–9)		18,640	47–57
105	July 28	Rays	8–10	Davis (8–7)	**Ziegler** (3–2)	Farnsworth (20)	16,466	47–58
106	July 29	Twins	5–9	Liriano (7–8)	**Gonzalez** (9–8)		25,656	47–59
107	July 30	Twins	8–3	**Moscoso** (4–5)	Blackburn (7–8)		19,605	48–59
108	July 31	Twins	7–3	**McCarthy** (4–5)	Pavano (6–8)		22,452	49–59

August (11–17)

#	Date	Opponent	Score	Win	Loss	Save	Attendance	Record
109	August 1	@ Mariners	4–8	Beavan (2–2)	**Cahill** (9–10)		23,335	49–60
110	August 2	@ Mariners	2–4	Hernández (10–9)	**Harden** (2–2)	League (25)	22,576	49–61
111	August 3	@ Mariners	4–7	Furbush (2–3)	**Gonzalez** (9–9)	League (26)	29,691	49–62
112	August 5	@ Rays	4–8	Niemann (6–4)	**Moscoso** (4–6)		15,168	49–63
113	August 6	@ Rays	8–0	**McCarthy** (5–5)	Cobb (3–2)		24,939	50–63
114	August 7	@ Rays	5–4 (10)	**De Los Santos** (1–0)	McGee (0–1)	**Bailey** (13)	21,425	51–63
115	August 9	@ Blue Jays	4–1	**Harden** (3–2)	Cecil (4–5)	**Bailey** (14)	20,521	52–63
116	August 10	@ Blue Jays	4–8	Janssen (4–0)	**Gonzalez** (9–10)	Litsch (1)	19,541	52–64
117	August 11	@ Blue Jays	10–3	**Moscoso** (5–6)	Mills (1–2)		27,918	53–64
118	August 12	Rangers	1–9	Wilson (11–5)	**McCarthy** (5–6)		20,288	53–65
119	August 13	Rangers	1–7	Lewis (11–8)	**Cahill** (9–11)		25,160	53–66
120	August 14	Rangers	6–7	Adams (1–0)	**Bailey** (0–3)	Feliz (23)	15,107	53–67
121	August 15	Orioles	2–6	Hunter (2–2)	**Gonzalez** (9–11)		10,122	53–68
122	August 16	Orioles	8–4	**Moscoso** (6–6)	Matusz (1–5)		12,325	54–68
123	August 17	Orioles	6–5	**McCarthy** (6–6)	Simón (3–6)	**Bailey** (15)	20,448	55–68
124	August 18	Blue Jays	0–7	Romero (12–9)	**Cahill** (9–12)		12,220	55–69
125	August 19	Blue Jays	2–0	**Harden** (4–2)	Cecil (4–6)	**Bailey** (16)	13,174	56–69
126	August 20	Blue Jays	5–1	**Gonzalez** (10–11)	Álvarez (0–1)		28,434	57–69
127	August 21	Blue Jays	0–1	Pérez (3–2)	**Moscoso** (6–7)	Janssen (2)	16,811	57–70
128	August 23	@ Yankees	6–5	**McCarthy** (7–6)	Colón (8–8)	**Bailey** (17)	47,343	58–70
129	August 24	@ Yankees	6–4 (10)	**De Los Santos** (2–0)	Soriano (2–2)	**Bailey** (18)	47,271	59–70
130	August 25	@ Yankees	9–22	Logan (4–2)	**De Los Santos** (2–1)		46,369	59–71
131	August 26	@ Red Sox	15–5	**Gonzalez** (11–11)	Wakefield (6–6)		38,239	60–71
132	August 27	@ Red Sox	3–9	Lester (14–6)	**Moscoso** (6–8)		37,314	60–72
133	August 27	@ Red Sox	0–4	Aceves (9–1)	**Godfrey** (1–2)		37,039	60–73
134	August 29	@ Indians	1–2	Huff (2–2)	**McCarthy** (7–7)	C. Perez (30)	18,201	60–74
135	August 30	@ Indians	2–6	Gómez (1–2)	**Cahill** (9–13)		20,372	60–75
136	August 31	@ Indians	3–4 (16)	Herrmann (4–0)	**Outman** (3–4)		15,202	60–76

September (14–12)

#	Date	Opponent	Score	Win	Loss	Save	Attendance	Record
137	September 1	@ Indians	7–0	**Gonzalez** (12–11)	Carmona (6–13)		14,192	61–76
138	September 2	Mariners	9–2	**Moscoso** (7–8)	Vargas (7–13)		14,972	62–76
139	September 3	Mariners	3–0	**McCarthy** (7–8)	Pineda (9–9)		19,732	63–76
140	September 4	Mariners	8–5	**Cahill** (10–13)	Beavan (3–5)	**Bailey** (19)	19,384	64–76
141	September 5	Royals	6–11	Holland (4–1)	**Bailey** (0–4)		14,577	64–77
142	September 6	Royals	4–7	Duffy (4–8)	**Gonzalez** (12–12)	Soria (26)	12,064	64–78
143	September 7	Royals	7–0	**Moscoso** (8–8)	Chen (10–7)		13,132	65–78
144	September 9	@ Rangers	4–13	Lewis (12–10)	**McCarthy** (8–8)		36,706	65–79
145	September 10	@ Rangers	8–7	**Cahill** (11–13)	Ogando (12–8)	Andrew Bailey (20)	46,151	66–79
146	September 11	@ Rangers	1–8	Wilson (16–6)	**Outman** (3–5)		46,727	66–80
147	September 12	Angels	6–3	**Gonzalez** (13–12)	Piñeiro (6–7)		12,858	67–80
148	September 13	Angels	3–6	Takahashi (4–3)	**De Los Santos** (2–2)	Walden (30)	13,212	67–81
149	September 14	Angels	1–4	Weaver (17–7)	**Harden** (4–3)	Walden (31)	14,743	67–82
150	September 15	Tigers	6–1	**McCarthy** (9–8)	Scherzer (14–9)		10,925	68–82
151	September 16	Tigers	1–3	Fister (9–13)	**Cahill** (11–14)	Valverde (45)	31,022	68–83
152	September 17	Tigers	5–3	**Gonzalez** (14–12)	Porcello (14–9)		19,451	69–83
153	September 18	Tigers	0–3	Verlander (24–5)	**Moscoso** (8–9)	Valverde (46)	18,405	69–84
154	September 20	Rangers	2–7	Holland (15–5)	**Harden** (4–4)		13,635	69–85
155	September 21	Rangers	2–3	Uehara (2–3)	**Balfour** (4–2)	Feliz (29)	19,589	69–86
156	September 22	Rangers	4–3	**Balfour** (5–2)	Adams (4–4)	**Bailey** (21)	14,090	70–86
157	September 23	@ Angels	3–1	**Gonzalez** (15–12)	Weaver (18–8)	**Bailey** (22)	39,217	71–86
158	September 24	@ Angels	2–4	Williams (4–0)	**Moscoso** (8–10)	Walden (32)	41,113	71–87
159	September 25	@ Angels	6–5	**De Los Santos** (3–2)	Walden (5–4)	**Bailey** (23)	40,794	72–87
160	September 26	@ Mariners	2–4	Vargas (10–13)	**McCarthy** (9–9)	League (36)	17,057	72–88
161	September 27	@ Mariners	7–0	**Cahill** (12–14)	Beavan (5–6)		18,600	73–88
162	September 28	@ Mariners	2–0	**Gonzalez** (16–12)	Vasquez (1–6)	**Bailey** (24)	20,173	74–88

== Player stats ==
=== Batting ===
Note: G = Games played; AB = At bats; R = Runs; H = Hits; 2B = Doubles; 3B = Triples; HR = Home runs; RBI = Runs batted in; SB = Stolen bases; BB = Walks; AVG = Batting average; SLG = Slugging average

Player	G	AB	R	H	2B	3B	HR	RBI	SB	BB	AVG	SLG
Coco Crisp	136	531	69	140	27	5	8	54	49	41	.264	.379
Hideki Matsui	141	517	58	130	28	0	12	72	1	56	.251	.375
Cliff Pennington	148	515	57	136	26	2	8	58	14	42	.264	.369
Josh Willingham	136	488	69	120	26	0	29	98	4	56	.246	.477
Kurt Suzuki	134	460	54	109	26	0	14	44	2	38	.237	.385
David DeJesus	131	442	60	106	20	5	10	46	4	45	.240	.376
Jemile Weeks	97	406	50	123	26	8	2	36	22	21	.303	.421
Conor Jackson	102	333	30	83	17	1	4	38	3	30	.249	.342
Scott Sizemore	93	305	42	76	21	1	11	52	4	43	.249	.433
Ryan Sweeney	108	264	34	70	11	3	1	25	1	33	.265	.341
Daric Barton	67	236	27	50	13	0	0	21	2	39	.212	.267
Mark Ellis	62	217	21	47	11	1	1	16	7	8	.217	.290
Brandon Allen	41	146	18	30	9	2	3	11	2	11	.205	.356
Kevin Kouzmanoff	46	136	13	30	6	0	4	17	2	8	.221	.353
Landon Powell	36	111	10	19	3	0	1	4	0	11	.171	.225
Andy LaRoche	40	93	10	23	6	1	0	5	0	8	.247	.333
Eric Sogard	27	70	7	14	3	0	2	4	0	4	.200	.329
Adam Rosales	24	61	5	6	0	0	2	8	0	4	.098	.197
Chris Carter	15	44	2	6	0	0	0	0	0	2	.136	.136
Michael Taylor	11	30	4	6	0	0	1	1	0	5	.200	.300
Anthony Recker	5	17	3	3	1	0	0	0	0	4	.176	.235
Jai Miller	7	12	2	3	0	0	1	2	0	0	.250	.500
Pitcher totals	162	18	0	0	0	0	0	0	0	0	.000	.000
Team totals	162	5452	645	1330	280	29	114	612	117	509	.244	.369

=== Pitching ===
Note: W = Wins; L = Losses; ERA = Earned run average; G = Games pitched; GS = Games started; SV = Saves; IP = Innings pitched; H = Hits allowed; R = Runs allowed; BB = Walks allowed; SO = Strikeouts

Player	W	L	ERA	G	GS	SV	IP	H	R	ER	BB	SO
Trevor Cahill	12	14	4.16	34	34	0	207.2	214	102	96	82	147
Gio Gonzalez	16	12	3.12	32	32	0	202.0	175	81	70	91	197
Brandon McCarthy	9	9	3.32	25	25	0	170.2	168	73	63	25	123
Guillermo Moscoso	8	10	3.38	23	21	0	128.0	102	59	48	38	174
Brett Anderson	3	6	4.00	13	13	0	83.1	86	40	37	25	61
Rich Harden	4	4	5.12	15	15	0	82.2	87	48	47	31	91
Grant Balfour	5	2	2.47	62	0	2	62.0	44	17	17	20	59
Craig Breslow	0	2	3.79	67	0	0	59.1	69	29	25	21	44
Brian Fuentes	2	8	3.70	67	0	12	58.1	52	30	24	20	42
Josh Outman	3	5	3.70	13	9	0	58.1	62	27	24	23	35
Andrew Bailey	0	4	3.24	42	0	24	41.2	34	18	15	12	41
Brad Ziegler	3	2	2.39	43	0	1	37.2	38	14	10	13	29
Tyson Ross	3	3	2.75	9	6	0	36.0	33	12	11	13	24
Michael Wuertz	0	0	6.68	39	0	0	33.2	37	25	25	26	32
Fautino De Los Santos	3	2	4.32	34	0	0	33.1	27	19	16	17	43
Jerry Blevins	0	0	2.86	26	0	0	28.1	24	14	9	14	26
Graham Godfrey	1	2	3.96	5	4	0	25.0	32	14	11	5	13
Joey Devine	1	1	3.52	26	0	0	23.0	18	9	9	11	20
Dallas Braden	1	1	3.00	3	3	0	18.0	18	7	6	5	15
Trystan Magnuson	0	0	6.14	9	0	0	14.2	15	11	10	5	11
David Purcey	0	0	2.13	9	0	0	12.2	9	3	3	3	7
Bobby Cramer	0	1	1.08	5	0	0	8.1	6	1	1	1	6
Jordan Norberto	0	0	8.10	6	0	0	6.2	8	6	6	7	4
Andrew Carignan	0	0	4.26	6	0	0	6.1	8	4	3	2	5
Bruce Billings	0	0	12.60	3	0	0	5.0	8	9	7	6	7
Neil Wagner	0	0	7.20	6	0	0	5.0	6	7	4	3	4
Team totals	74	88	3.71	162	162	39	1447.2	1380	679	597	519	1160

== Farm system ==
=== Minor league standings ===
Level	Team	League	Manager	W	L	Position
AAA	Sacramento River Cats	Pacific Coast League	Darren Bush			
AA	Midland RockHounds	Texas League	Steve Scarsone			
High-A	Stockton Ports	California League	Webster Garrison			
Low-A	Burlington Bees	Midwest League	Aaron Nieckula			
SS-A	Vermont Lake Monsters	New York–Penn League	Rick Magnante			
Rookie	AZL Athletics	Arizona League	Marcus Jensen			
Rookie	DSL Athletics	Dominican Summer League	Oscar Spencer			

Tony DeFrancesco moves to AAA-Oklahoma City RedHawks (HOU) after managing in Oakland's farm system for 16 years (except 2008, was on MLB staff).

=== Top prospects ===
Player	Position	Baseball America	Baseball Prospectus	MLB	2011 Levels
Grant Green	SS	1	2	1	Midland RockHounds (AA)
Chris Carter	OF/1B	2	1	2	Sacramento River Cats (Class AAA)
Michael Choice	OF	3	3	3	Stockton Ports (A)
Tyson Ross	P	4	7	--	Oakland Athletics
Jemile Weeks	2B	5	6	5	Sacramento River Cats (Class AAA)
Max Stassi	C	6	9	7	Stockton Ports (Advanced A)
Aaron Shipman	OF	7	--	8	AZL Athletics
Yordy Cabrera	SS	8	5	6	Burlington Bees (Class A)
Ian Krol	P	9	4	4	
Michael Taylor	OF	10	11	10	Sacramento River Cats
Renato Núñez	3B	--	8	9	DSL Athletics
Stephen Parker	3B	--	10	--	Midland RockHounds (Class AA)

- Bold on 40-Man roster to begin 2011 season.
- Top Prospects according to Baseball America, Baseball Prospectus

MLB.com named 1B Chris Carter (even though being played as an OF), SS Grant Green and 2B Jemile Weeks as No. 8 top prospects as their positions in MLB.com's 2011 Top 50 Prospects report. FanHouse named Grant Green (58), Chris Carter (91), and Michael Choice (94) to their top 100. Baseball America named Grant Green (63) and Chris Carter (91) to their top 100.

=== Minor league info ===
Joselito Adames, who pitched for AZL Athletics in '10 and STK/VAN in '09, was suspended 50-games for violating MiLB's drug policy in January.
