= Rajai Davis =

American baseball player (born 1980)

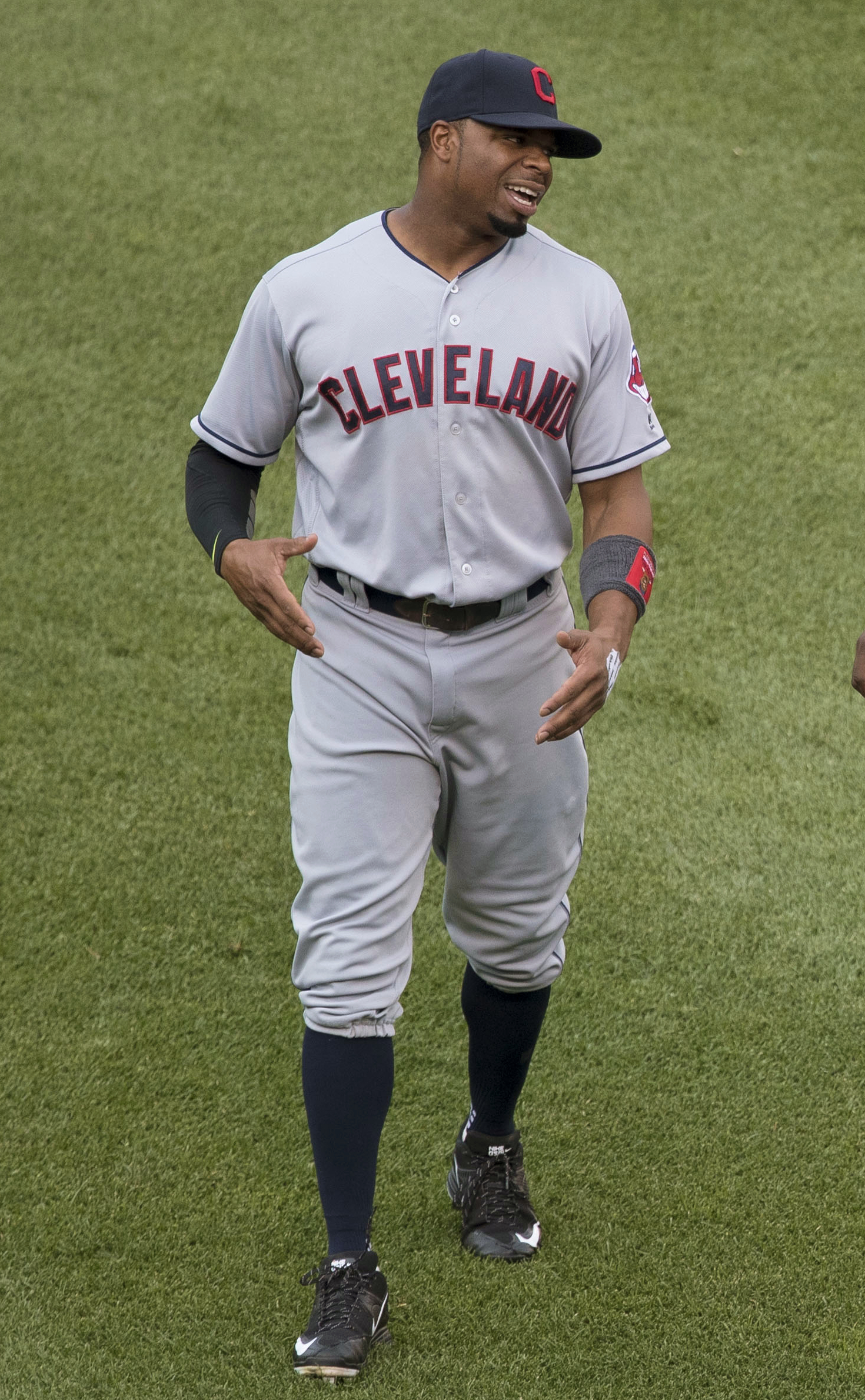
- Davis with the Cleveland Indians in 2016
- Outfielder
- Born: October 19, 1980 (age 46); Norwich, Connecticut, U.S.
- Batted: Right Threw: Right

MLB debut
- August 14, 2006, for the Pittsburgh Pirates

Last MLB appearance
- September 29, 2019, for the New York Mets

MLB statistics
- Batting average: .262
- Home runs: 62
- Runs batted in: 387
- Stolen bases: 415
- Stats at Baseball Reference

Teams
- Pittsburgh Pirates (2006–2007); San Francisco Giants (2007–2008); Oakland Athletics (2008–2010); Toronto Blue Jays (2011–2013); Detroit Tigers (2014–2015); Cleveland Indians (2016); Oakland Athletics (2017); Boston Red Sox (2017); Cleveland Indians (2018); New York Mets (2019)

Career highlights and awards
- AL stolen base leader (2016)

Rajai Lavae Davis (/ˈrɑːʒeɪ/; born October 19, 1980) is an American former professional baseball outfielder. He played 14 seasons in Major League Baseball (MLB) for the Pittsburgh Pirates, San Francisco Giants, Oakland Athletics, Toronto Blue Jays, Detroit Tigers, Cleveland Indians, Boston Red Sox, and New York Mets. He is currently employed by MLB in the Baseball Operations department.

Davis began his career as a switch-hitter, but became a full-time right-handed hitter prior to the 2004 season. He also throws right-handed. He is most known for his game-tying home run against Aroldis Chapman in the eighth inning of Game 7 of the 2016 World Series, which at the time was the third-most consequential play in terms of Championship Win Probability Added.

== Early life ==
Davis was born in Norwich, Connecticut, on October 19, 1980. He played Little League Baseball in Willimantic, Connecticut, for the Willimantic Fire Fighters. In 1991, Davis helped the Willimantic Little League All-Star Team win the District 11 championship. Rajai also played in the Willimantic Youth Football League.

In 1999, Davis graduated from New London High School where he earned letters playing baseball, basketball, and football. During the summer he was a member of the New London American Legion team.

After high school, Davis attended the University of Connecticut at Avery Point of the NJCAA in Groton. While in college, Davis played for the New England Collegiate Baseball League's Middletown Giants (now the Futures Collegiate Baseball League's North Shore Navigators).

== Professional career ==
=== Minor leagues ===
After borrowing gas money to drive himself from Connecticut to Pittsburgh for a pre-draft open workout at PNC Park, Davis was drafted by the Pittsburgh Pirates in the 38th round (1,134th overall) of the 2001 Major League Baseball draft as a second baseman. Davis chose to sign with the Pirates instead of accepting a scholarship offer to continue his college baseball career at UConn. He played six full minor league seasons before making his major league debut. He had a .305 career minor league batting average to go along with 251 stolen bases in 322 attempts. In addition, Davis made three consecutive All-Star appearances at three different levels of play from 2002 to 2004.

=== Major leagues ===
==== Pittsburgh Pirates ====
Davis made his major league debut for the Pirates on August 14, 2006, going 0-for-1 in a pinch hit appearance against the Milwaukee Brewers. He stole his first base two days later, but did not get his first Major League hit for another two weeks. It came on August 29, in the form of a pinch hit double off Chicago Cubs pitcher Carlos Zambrano. He made his first and only defensive appearance of 2006 the next day, playing three innings in right field.

==== San Francisco Giants ====
Davis was traded to the San Francisco Giants with pitcher Stephen MacFarland on July 31, 2007, for Matt Morris. He made his Giants debut the next night against the Los Angeles Dodgers, stealing a base and throwing out a runner from center field. In his time with the Giants, Davis was a semi-regular in the Giants lineup, filling in for Dave Roberts or Barry Bonds whenever necessary.

On August 13, the Giants played a doubleheader in Pittsburgh, which was Davis's first time back since the trade. He started in center in both games, going a combined three-for-seven, with three doubles, two runs scored, two stolen bases, and a run batted in (RBI). Additionally, in the second game, Davis made a spectacular diving catch on the warning track in left-center field.

Just three days later, he robbed Andruw Jones of a possible home run to end the game at Turner Field. Davis kept the ball as a souvenir. The next night, Davis hit his first career home run off Florida Marlins starting pitcher Scott Olsen.

Davis was second among the National League (NL) rookie leaders in stolen bases, with 22. The leader, Arizona's Chris Young, had 27 – but also had nearly three times as many at-bats as Davis.

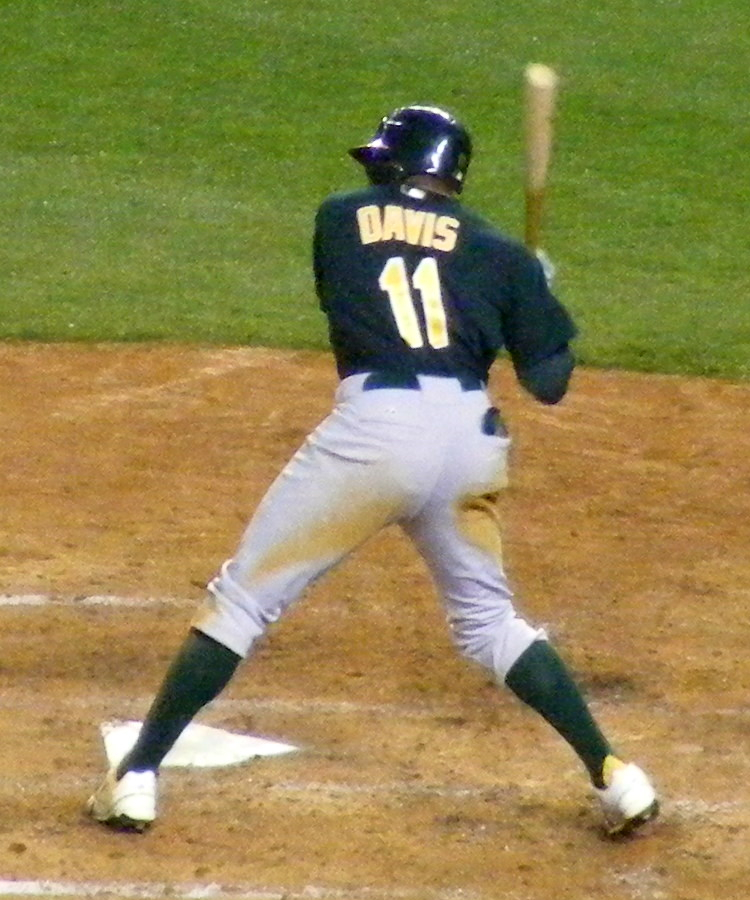
Davis batting for the Oakland Athletics in 2009

==== Oakland Athletics ====
On April 23, 2008, Davis was claimed off waivers by the Oakland Athletics and was added to the active roster. With Oakland in 2008, he stole 25 bases in 196 at-bats. In 2009, Davis became the primary center fielder for the A's, hitting .305 with 41 stolen bases in 125 games, primarily in center field. In 2010, he also started for most of the season hitting .284 with 52 RBIs and 50 stolen bases. When Coco Crisp came back from injury, Davis switched from center field to playing both left and right field for the remainder of the season.

==== Toronto Blue Jays ====
Following the acquisition of David DeJesus, the Athletics traded Davis to the Toronto Blue Jays for Trystan Magnuson and Daniel Farquhar on November 17, 2010.

In a game against the Los Angeles Angels of Anaheim on August 14, 2011, Davis tore his hamstring running to first base. He was placed on the 15-day disabled list after the game. Prior to the injury, Davis ranked third in the American League in stolen bases with 34.

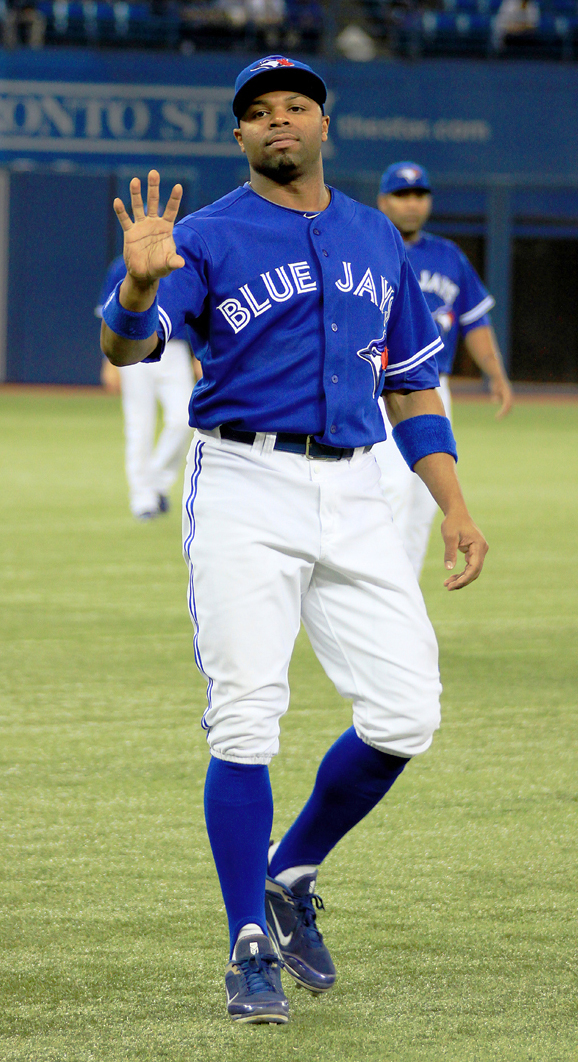
Davis with the Toronto Blue Jays in 2012

On May 18, 2012, in a home game against the New York Mets, Davis had the first multi home run game of his career, hitting two home runs and four RBIs in a 14–5 win. On July 30 in a game against the Seattle Mariners, Davis hit his first career lead-off home run. The home run, his sixth of the season, established a career high for Davis in a single season. On August 12, 2012, Davis recorded five RBIs against the New York Yankees, establishing a single game career high in RBIs. Davis finished second in stolen bases, with 46, for the 2012 campaign (Mike Trout of the Los Angeles Angels of Anaheim led the league with 49).

Davis was placed on the disabled list on May 11, 2013, with a strained left oblique. After a brief two game rehab assignment with the Dunedin Blue Jays, Davis was activated from the disabled list on June 4. On June 8, in the bottom of the 18th inning against the Texas Rangers, Davis hit a single that scored Emilio Bonifacio in the longest Blue Jays game in franchise history. In a game against the Houston Astros on July 28, Davis tied a Blue Jays franchise record by stealing four bases, joining Damaso Garcia, Dave Collins, Roberto Alomar, and Otis Nixon.

==== Detroit Tigers ====
On December 11, 2013, the Tigers signed Davis to a two-year, $10 million contract. On June 30, 2014, he hit a walk-off grand slam home run against Oakland Athletics closer Sean Doolittle to win the game 5–4. It was the first walk-off homer of Davis' career, and the 28th documented ultimate grand slam in MLB history.

On August 30, 2014, Davis recorded his 32nd stolen base of the season, and his 300th stolen base of his career. Davis became just the second active player to record a 30-steal season for three different teams. Davis' 300 stolen bases ranks him 12th among active players.

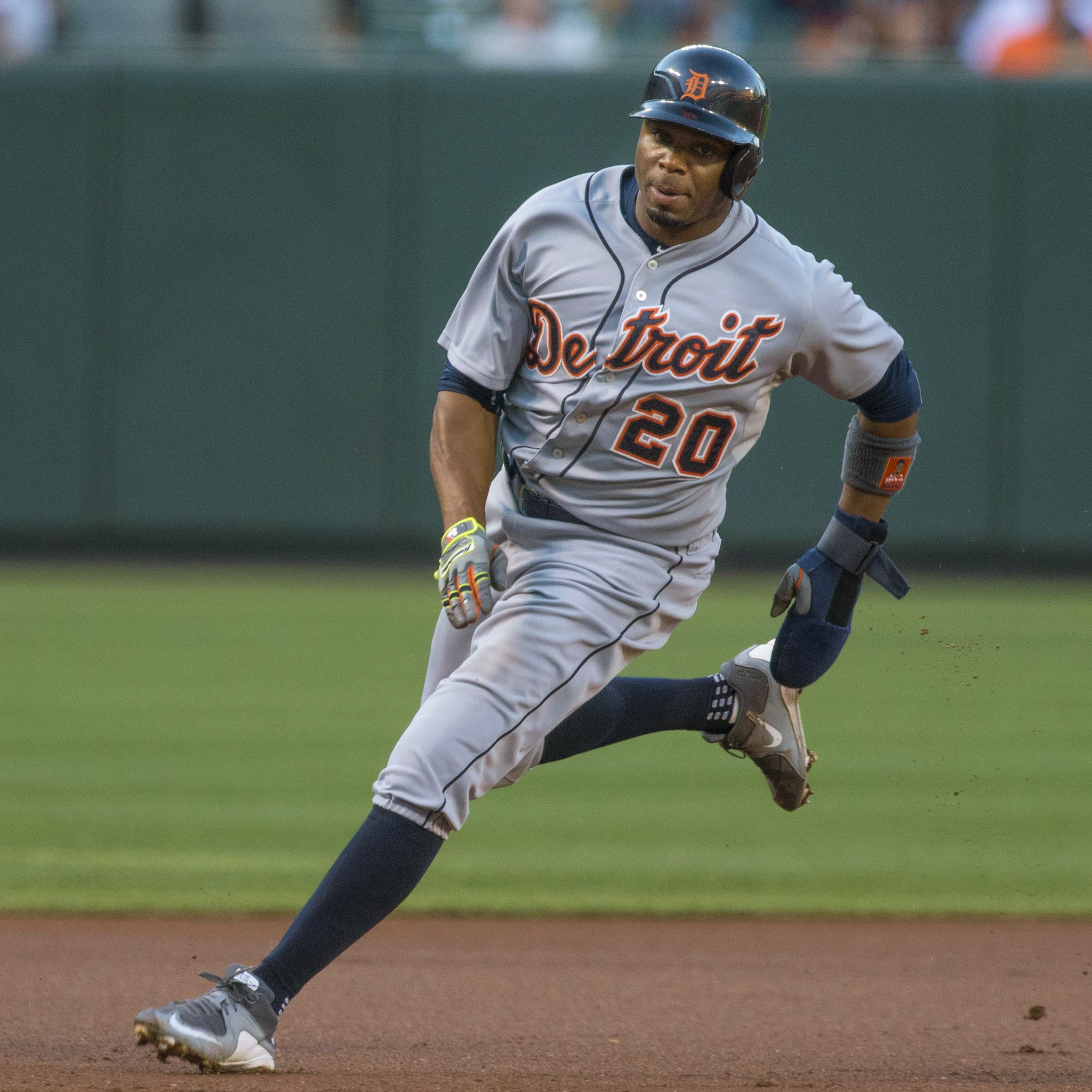
Davis playing for the Detroit Tigers in 2015

In 2014, Davis played in 134 games for Detroit, batting .282 with 36 stolen bases. He was used in an outfield platoon in 2015, playing in 112 games. Despite limited plate appearances this season (370), he hit a career-high 11 triples.

==== Cleveland Indians ====
On December 17, 2015, Davis signed a one-year, $5.25 million contract with the Cleveland Indians.

On July 2, 2016, Davis hit for the cycle in a game against the Toronto Blue Jays. It was the eighth cycle in Cleveland Indians franchise history, the first since Travis Hafner in 2003, and the sixth player in Major League history to hit for a reverse cycle. He led off the game with a home run, hit a triple in the third inning, a double in the sixth inning, and finished the cycle with a single in the ninth inning.

On November 2, 2016, during Game 7 of the 2016 World Series, Davis hit a game tying, two-run home run (on a 2-2 count) in the bottom of the eighth inning off of Cubs closer Aroldis Chapman. It was the first home run allowed by Chapman since June 18, when he was with the Yankees. The Indians, however, went on to lose the game (and thus the series) to the Cubs in extra innings. The home run, as of the end of the 2023 MLB season, remains as the third-most consequential play in MLB history according to the statistic "Championship Win Probability Added," adding 39% to Cleveland's chances of winning its first World Series since 1948. It also remains as the highest percentage in that stat for any team that went on to lose the World Series.

==== Oakland Athletics return ====
In January 2017, Davis signed a one-year deal with the Athletics. During his time with Oakland during the 2017 season, Davis appeared in 100 games, batting .233./.294/.353 with 18 RBIs, 5 home runs, and 26 stolen bases. He primarily played center field, along with some games at the other outfield positions.

==== Boston Red Sox ====
The Boston Red Sox acquired Davis from the A's for minor league outfielder Rafael Rincones on August 23, 2017. In 36 at bats with Boston he hit .250/.289/.306.

==== Cleveland Indians return ====
On February 17, 2018, Davis signed a minor league contract with the Cleveland Indians that included an invitation to the Indians' spring training camp. The Indians purchased Davis's contract on March 29, 2018. For the season with the Indians, he batted .224/.278/.281 in 196 at bats.

==== New York Mets ====
On December 17, 2018, Davis signed a minor-league contract with the New York Mets, the team for which he rooted as a child growing up in Connecticut. On May 22, 2019, Davis was informed during batting practice for the AAA Syracuse Mets, before their road game in Pennsylvania, that he had been called up to the big league club. He took a two-hour Uber ride to Citi Field, arriving in the third inning, and stopped to take a photo with his Uber driver outside the stadium. He only met manager Mickey Callaway in the fifth; he entered the game in the eighth as a pinch-hitter and hit a three-run home run, extending the Mets' lead to 6-1. The entire story captured national media attention.

He was designated for assignment on May 26. After clearing waivers, Davis accepted an assignment to the minor leagues, and was outrighted off the major league roster on May 28, 2019. On August 20, the Mets selected Davis' contract. On September 14, after Jacob deGrom and Hyun-Jin Ryu both went seven scoreless innings, Davis hit a pinch-hit bases-clearing 3-run double in the bottom of the 8th against Julio Urias to give the Mets a 3-0 lead, which they would hold to even the series against the Los Angeles Dodgers. In 2019 he batted .200/.231/.400 with one home run in 25 at bats.

==== Acereros de Monclova ====
On February 13, 2020, Davis signed with the Acereros de Monclova of the Mexican League (LMB). Davis was released by the Acereros on September 1, 2020, after never playing a game due to the cancelled LMB season.

== Post-playing career ==
On February 1, 2021, it was announced that Davis would be retiring to take a position in the baseball operations department of Major League Baseball.

== Personal life ==
Davis and his wife, Marissa, have two children: a daughter (born 2013) and a son (born 2015). They live in East Lyme, Connecticut.

Davis is a Christian.

== See also ==
- List of Major League Baseball players to hit for the cycle
- List of Major League Baseball ultimate grand slams

Achievements
Preceded by Freddie Freeman	Hitting for the cycle July 2, 2016	Succeeded by John Jaso
