= Ryan Sweeney (baseball) =

American baseball player (born 1985)

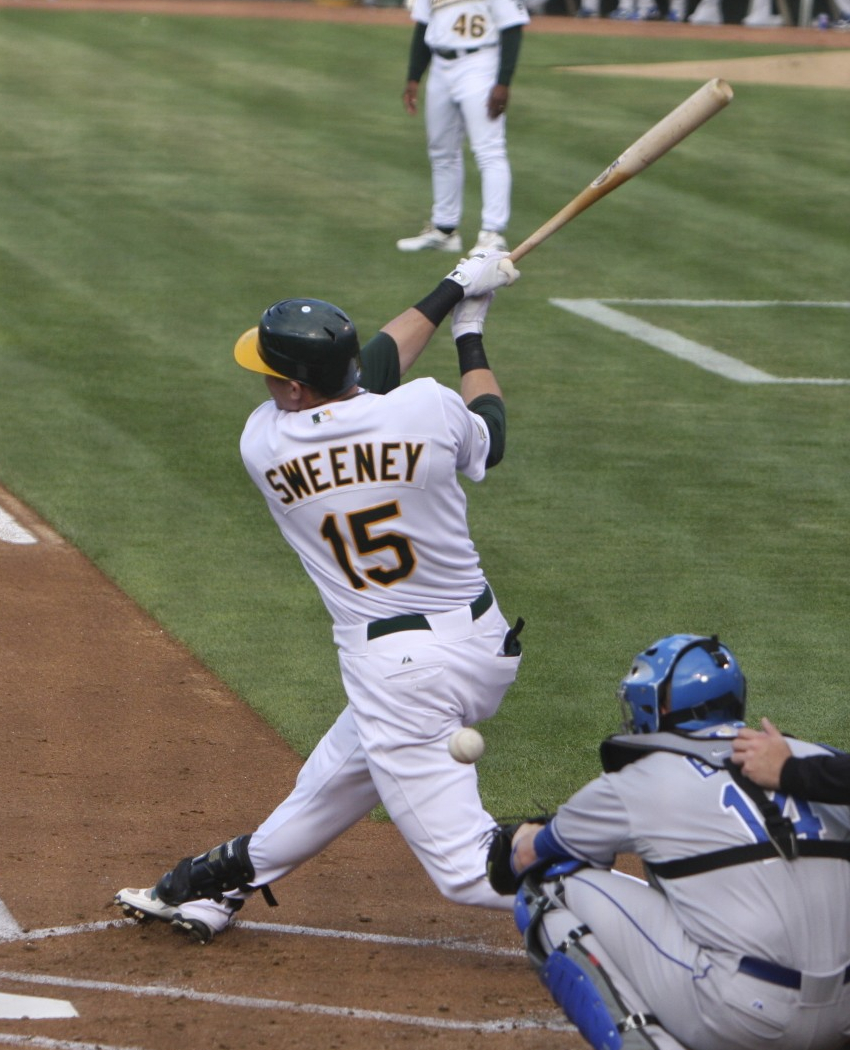
- Sweeney with the Oakland Athletics
- Outfielder
- Born: February 20, 1985 (age 41); Cedar Rapids, Iowa, U.S.
- Batted: Left Threw: Left

MLB debut
- September 1, 2006, for the Chicago White Sox

Last MLB appearance
- August 26, 2014, for the Chicago Cubs

MLB statistics
- Batting average: .276
- Home runs: 23
- Runs batted in: 224
- Stats at Baseball Reference

Teams
- Chicago White Sox (2006–2007); Oakland Athletics (2008–2011); Boston Red Sox (2012); Chicago Cubs (2013–2014)

Ryan Joseph Sweeney (born February 20, 1985) is an American former Major League Baseball outfielder. He played in Major League Baseball (MLB) for the Chicago White Sox, Oakland Athletics, Boston Red Sox and Chicago Cubs.

== Early life ==
Sweeney was born in Cedar Rapids, Iowa and originally attended Jefferson High School, but conflict between winter showcase games and regular high school basketball schedule obligations led him to transfer to and graduate from cross-town Xavier High School in Cedar Rapids in 2003.

== Baseball career ==
=== Minor leagues ===
He had originally planned to play for Tony Gwynn at San Diego State University, but signed with the Chicago White Sox after they chose him in the 2nd round of the 2003 MLB draft.

Sweeney played in the White Sox minor league organization from 2003 to 2006, including: Bristol (Appalachian League) and Great Falls (Pioneer League) in 2003; Winston-Salem (Carolina League) in 2004; Birmingham (Southern League) in 2005; and Charlotte (International League) in 2006.

=== Chicago White Sox ===
In 2006, he was called up to the White Sox, and played in 21 games for the major league team. At the beginning of the 2007 season, Ryan was ranked by Baseball America as prospect No. 1 in the White Sox organization. That year he played in 15 games for the White Sox and 105 for the Charlotte Knights.

=== Oakland Athletics ===
On January 3, 2008, the White Sox traded him, along with fellow prospects pitchers Fautino de los Santos and Gio González, to Oakland for outfielder Nick Swisher. He played in 8 games for the AAA Pacific Coast League Sacramento River Cats before being called up to the major league team, where he played in 116 games. Sweeney remained with the A's through 2011.

=== Boston Red Sox ===
On December 28, 2011, Sweeney and Andrew Bailey were traded to the Boston Red Sox for Josh Reddick, Miles Head and Raúl Alcántara.

Sweeney played in 63 games for the Red Sox during the 2012 season. On November 30, 2012, he was among those not offered a contract for 2013 by the Red Sox, and became a free agent.

On January 26, 2013, the Red Sox signed Sweeney to a minor league contract which would pay him $1.25 million plus incentives if he made the major league team. Sweeney was signed to provide additional outfield depth when the team learned that Ryan Kalish required surgery and would miss at least part of the 2013 season.

At the end of spring training in March, 2013, Sweeney was not added to Boston's major league roster. Rather than accept assignment to the minor leagues, he opted out of his contract and became a free agent.

=== Chicago Cubs ===
Sweeney signed a minor league contract with the Chicago Cubs on April 2, 2013.

On May 6, 2013, the Cubs announced that Sweeney would be joining the major league team, with Dave Sappelt moving to the Cubs' Triple-A affiliate to make room on the Cubs roster for Sweeney. On May 8, 2013, Sweeney recorded his first hit as a Chicago Cub. Sweeney's first home run as a Cub came on May 19, 2013, at Wrigley Field. On June 15, Sweeney took over as the starting center fielder when David DeJesus sprained his shoulder running into a wall. On June 29, Sweeney fractured his rib while running into a wall making a catch against the Mariners. Brian Bogusevic then became the starting center fielder. On September 1, he returned to the Cubs, receiving the bulk of the starts in center field to end the year.

In 2013, Sweeney played 70 games with the Cubs and hit .266/.324/.448 with 6 HR and 19 RBI. On October 8, Sweeney signed a two-year, $3.5 million deal with a $2.5 million option for 2016. He would earn $1.5 million annually, and the option had a $500,000 buyout. In 77 games in 2014, Sweeney hit .251 with 3 home runs and 20 RBIs. He went on the disabled list on August 27 with a left hamstring strain.

Sweeney was designated for assignment by the Cubs on April 5, 2015, and released on April 7.

=== Minnesota Twins ===
On December 17, 2015, the Minnesota Twins announced that Sweeney was one of several players who received a minor league contract and an offer to attend the Twins' spring training. He was released on March 25, 2016.
