= Josh Outman =

American baseball player (born 1984)

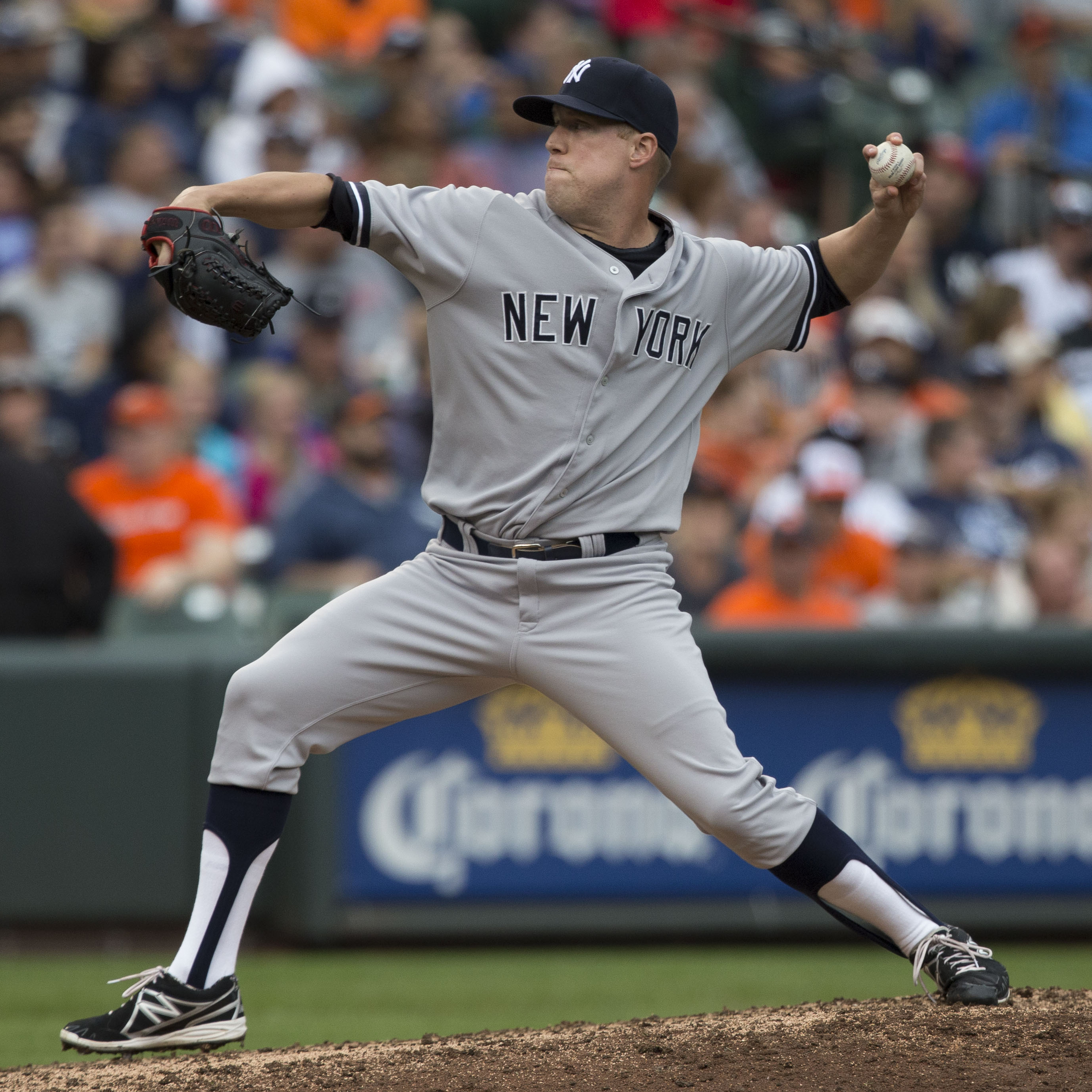
- Outman with the New York Yankees in 2014
- Pitcher
- Born: September 14, 1984 (age 41); St. Louis, Missouri, U.S.
- Batted: Left Threw: Left

MLB debut
- September 2, 2008, for the Oakland Athletics

Last MLB appearance
- September 19, 2014, for the New York Yankees

MLB statistics
- Win–loss record: 16–11
- Earned run average: 4.43
- Strikeouts: 226
- Stats at Baseball Reference

Teams
- Oakland Athletics (2008–2009, 2011); Colorado Rockies (2012–2013); Cleveland Indians (2014); New York Yankees (2014)
Medals
Men's baseball
Representing United States
Baseball World Cup
Gold medal – first place	2007 Tianmu	National team

Joshua Stephen Outman (born September 14, 1984) is an American former professional baseball pitcher. He pitched in Major League Baseball (MLB) for the Oakland Athletics (2008-2009, 2011), Colorado Rockies (2012-2013), Cleveland Indians (2014), and New York Yankees (2014).

== Early life ==
Outman graduated from Lindbergh High School and then pitched for Forest Park Community College in Saint Louis before transferring to the Central Missouri State. While playing for the Central Missouri State Mules, he posted a 10–2 record and helped the Mules finish third in the NCAA Division II World Series.

== Career ==
=== Philadelphia Phillies ===
Outman was drafted by the Philadelphia Phillies in the 10th round, with the 307th overall selection, of the 2005 Major League Baseball draft.

Outman became a prospect in the organization, and was named the 12th-best prospect in the Phillies organization in 2007.

=== Oakland Athletics ===
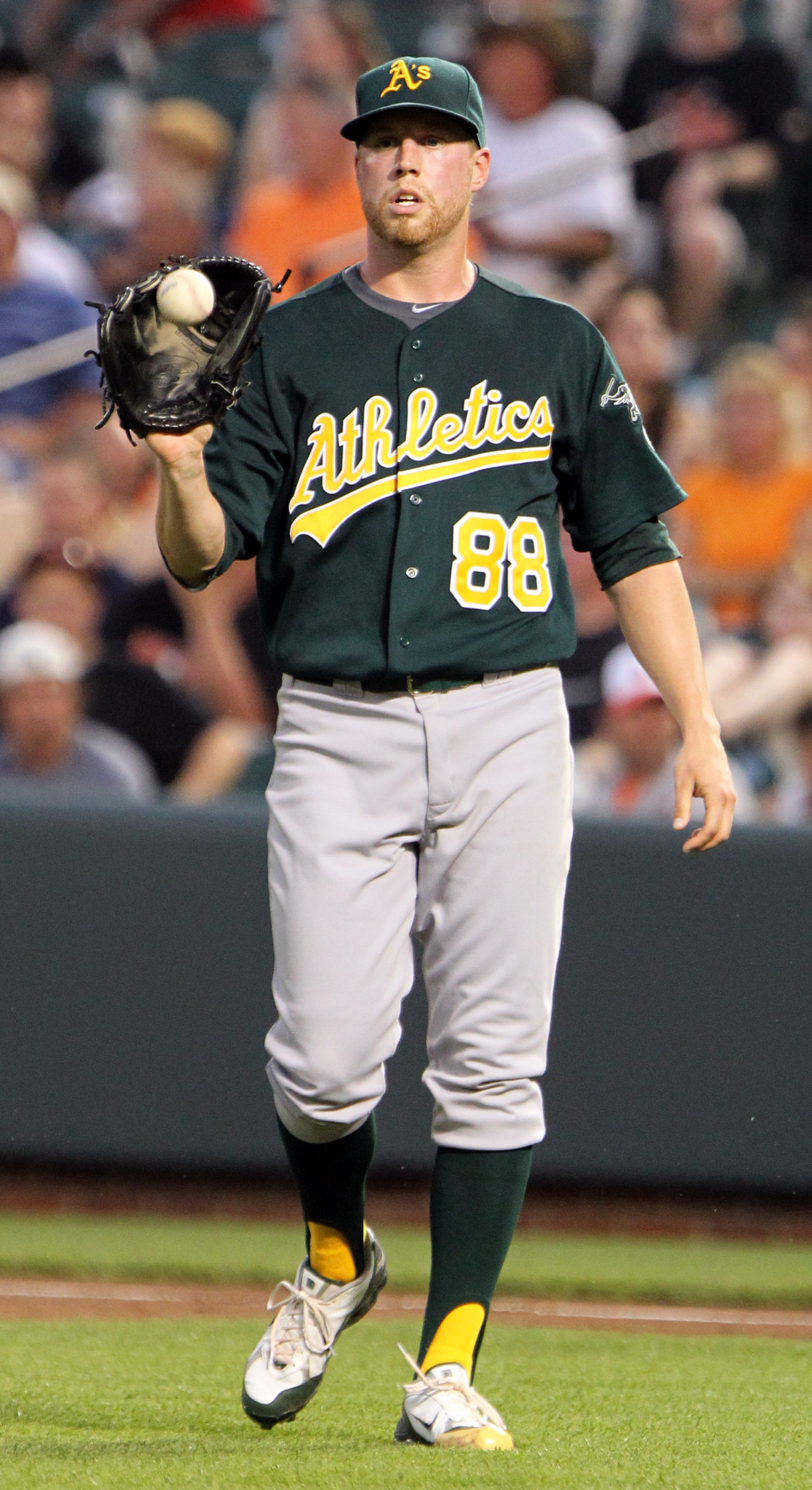
Outman with the Oakland Athletics in 2011

On July 17, 2008, Outman was traded, along with fellow prospects Adrian Cardenas and Matthew Spencer, to the Oakland Athletics in exchange for starting pitcher Joe Blanton. Outman was promoted to the major leagues for the first time on September 2, 2008, and pitched two scoreless innings that night against the Kansas City Royals, striking out two. In six appearances (four starts) for Oakland during his rookie campaign, Outman logged a 1-2 record and 4.56 ERA with 19 strikeouts across 25 2/3 innings pitched.

Outman's performance in the 2009 season gave him the fan nickname "Out-Man", because of his ability to get the easy outs. His brother, Zachary, was selected by the Toronto Blue Jays, in the 28th round of the 2009 Major League Baseball draft, out of Saint Louis University. Outman made 14 total appearances (12 starts) for Oakland during the year, compiling a 4-1 record and 3.48 ERA with 53 strikeouts across 67 1/3 innings pitched. On June 24, 2009, Outman was placed on the disabled list with an injury to his pitching elbow. He subsequently underwent Tommy John surgery, ending his season on June 30.

Outman, recovering from surgery, missed the entirety of the 2010 season. He returned to action in 2011, making 13 appearances (nine starts), in which he posted a 3-5 record and 3.70 ERA with 35 strikeouts over 58 1/3 innings of work.

=== Colorado Rockies ===
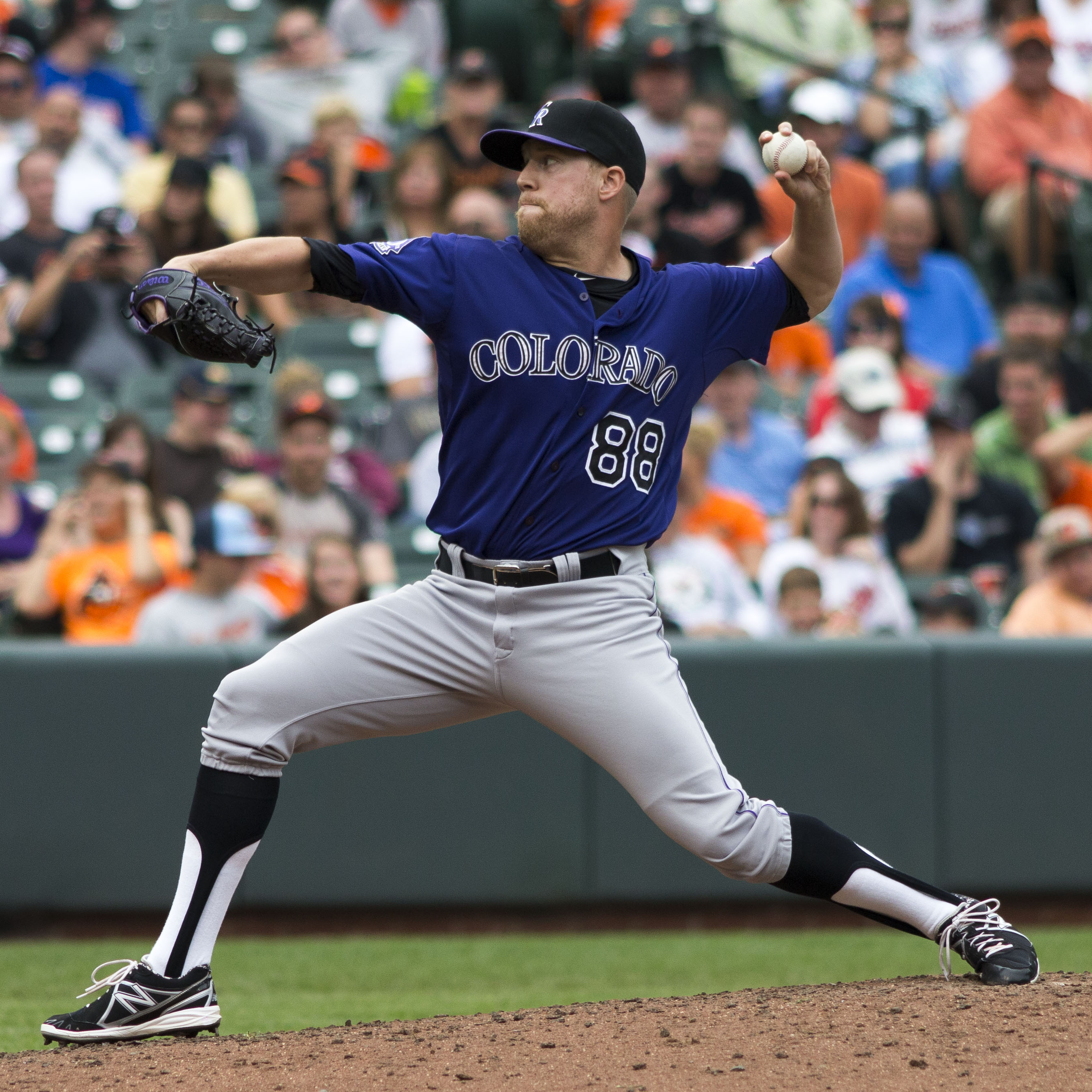
Outman with the Colorado Rockies in 2013

On January 16, 2012, Outman, along with pitcher Guillermo Moscoso, was traded to the Colorado Rockies in exchange for outfielder Seth Smith. He made 27 appearances (seven starts) for the team, but struggled to a 1-3 record and 8.19 ERA with 40 strikeouts across 40 2/3 innings pitched.

Outman made 61 appearances out of the bullpen for Colorado during the 2013 season, accumulating a 3-0 record and 4.33 ERA with 53 strikeouts over 54 innings of work.

=== Cleveland Indians ===
Outman was traded to the Cleveland Indians on December 18, 2013 in exchange for outfielder Drew Stubbs. On January 14, 2014, Outman avoided arbitration, signing a one-year, $1.25 million contract. In 31 appearances out of the bullpen for the Indians, he compiled a 4-0 record and 3.28 ERA with 24 strikeouts across 24 2/3 innings pitched. On June 18, Outman was designated for assignment by Cleveland. He cleared waivers and was sent outright to the Triple-A Columbus Clippers on June 25.

=== New York Yankees ===
On August 28, 2014, Outman was traded to the New York Yankees in exchange for a player to be named later or cash considerations. He made nine scoreless appearances for the Yankees, recording two strikeouts over 3 2/3 innings pitched. Outman was designated for assignment by New York on September 22, and elected free agency on September 30.

=== Atlanta Braves ===
Outman signed a one-year contract with the Atlanta Braves on January 7, 2015. He pitched solely in the minor leagues for Atlanta, appearing for the rookie-level Gulf Coast League Braves, Single-A Rome Braves, High-A Carolina Mudcats, and Double-A Mississippi Braves. Outman was released by the Braves organization on August 4.

=== New Britain Bees ===
On April 7, 2016, Outman signed with the New Britain Bees of the Atlantic League of Professional Baseball. In 14 starts for the Bees, he went 3-3 with a 4.24 ERA and 55 strikeouts over 85 innings pitched.

=== Pittsburgh Pirates ===
On July 9, 2016, Outman signed a minor league contract with the Pittsburgh Pirates. In 10 appearances for the Triple-A Indianapolis Indians, he logged an 0-1 record and 4.95 ERA with 15 strikeouts over 20 innings of work. Outman was released by the Pirates organization on August 18.

=== Sugar Land Skeeters ===
On December 31, 2016, Outman signed a minor league contract with the Washington Nationals. He was released without making an appearance for the organization on May 2, 2017.

On May 7, 2017, Outman signed with the Sugar Land Skeeters of the Atlantic League of Professional Baseball. In two games (one start) for Sugar Land, Outman recorded a 1.29 ERA and five strikeouts over seven innings of work.

=== Acereros de Monclova ===
On June 2, 2017, Outman signed with the Acereros de Monclova of the Mexican League. In 7 appearances for Monclova, he posted a 2-0 record and 3.24 ERA with 7 strikeouts across 8 1/3 innings of relief.

=== Pericos de Puebla ===
Outman was traded to the Pericos de Puebla on June 24, 2017. In 8 starts for Puebla, Outman logged a 5-1 record and 5.36 ERA with 27 strikeouts across 43 2/3 innings pitched.

=== New Britain Bees (second stint) ===
On November 11, 2017, Outman was traded to the Rieleros de Aguascalientes along with Andres Ivan Meza, Julio Felix, and Ramon Delgado. He was released prior to the 2018 season.

On June 1, 2018, Outman signed with the New Britain Bees of the Atlantic League of Professional Baseball. In 21 games (5 starts) for New Britain, he posted a 4-4 record and 5.79 ERA with 37 strikeouts over 42 innings of work.

=== Pericos de Puebla (second stint) ===
On August 16, 2018, Outman's contract was purchased by the Pericos de Puebla of the Mexican League. In 3 starts for the Pericos, he registered a 1-2 record and 4.50 ERA with 13 strikeouts across 16 innings pitched. Outman became a free agent following the season.

=== Piratas de Campeche ===
On May 15, 2019, Outman signed with the Piratas de Campeche of the Mexican League. In 10 appearances (9 starts) for Campeche, he struggled to a 2-4 record and 9.26 ERA with 25 strikeouts across 34 innings of work. Outman was released by the Piratas on July 16.

== Pitching style ==
Outman threw five pitches, relying most heavily on a four-seam fastball at 93–96 mph. He also threw a two-seamer (90–95), a slider (80–83), a changeup (78–83), and a curveball (low-to-mid 70s). His changeup was not thrown to left-handed hitters, but was a common pitch against right-handers. He used his slider a great deal against lefties but typically used it against righties only in 2-strike counts. His slider was his best swing-and-miss pitch, with a swinging strike rate of 24.8 percent.
