= Guillermo Moscoso =

Venezuelan baseball player (born 1983)

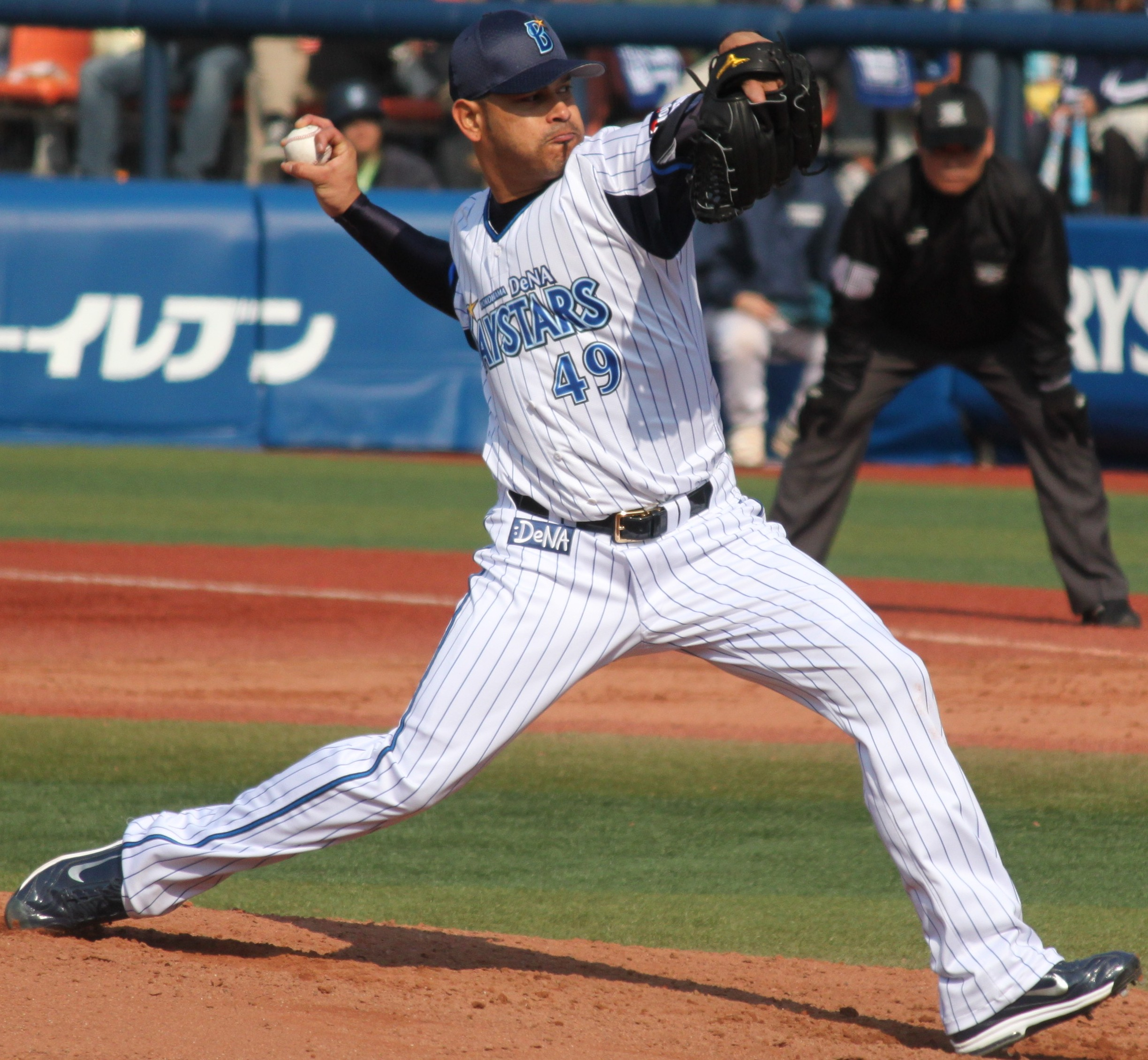
- Moscoso with the Yokohama DeNA BayStars
- Pitcher
- Born: November 14, 1983 (age 42); Maracay, Venezuela
- Batted: Right Threw: Right

Professional debut
- MLB: May 30, 2009, for the Texas Rangers
- NPB: June 4, 2014, for the Yokohama DeNA BayStars

Last appearance
- MLB: September 29, 2013, for the San Francisco Giants
- NPB: September 15, 2016, for the Yokohama DeNA BayStars

MLB statistics
- Win–loss record: 13–14
- Earned run average: 4.28
- Strikeouts: 166

NPB statistics
- Win–loss record: 17–22
- Earned run average: 4.27
- Strikeouts: 215
- Stats at Baseball Reference

Teams
- Texas Rangers (2009–2010); Oakland Athletics (2011); Colorado Rockies (2012); San Francisco Giants (2013); Yokohama DeNA BayStars (2014–2016)

Guillermo Alejandro Moscoso (born November 14, 1983) is a Venezuelan former professional baseball pitcher. He played in Major League Baseball (MLB) for the Texas Rangers, Oakland Athletics, Colorado Rockies, and San Francisco Giants, and in Nippon Professional Baseball (NPB) for the Yokohama DeNA BayStars.

== Career ==
=== Detroit Tigers ===
As a member of the Oneonta Tigers, Moscoso pitched the second perfect game in New York–Penn League history in a 6–0 victory over the Batavia Muckdogs on July 15, 2007.

=== Texas Rangers ===
Moscoso was acquired by the Texas Rangers from the Detroit Tigers along with pitcher Carlos Melo for catcher Gerald Laird on December 12, 2008.

On May 30, 2009, Moscoso made his major league debut against the Oakland Athletics, striking out 2 and pitching a scoreless ninth inning.

After appearing in ten games in '09, Moscoso had an ERA of 3.21 through 14.0 innings pitched, giving up 15 hits, 7 runs, and 6 walks but also struck out a dozen. As of August, Moscoso has only pitched one game in the new decade. On May 20, against Baltimore, Guillermo pitched 2/3 of an inning, giving up two hits, two runs, and two walks while also striking out two. His ERA is currently 27.00.

=== Oakland Athletics ===
In January 2011, Texas traded Moscoso to the Oakland for Ryan Kelly.

On May 24, 2011, he was recalled to the Oakland Athletics to take the place in the rotation of Tyson Ross, who went on the DL with a strained left oblique. Fautino de los Santos was optioned to Triple-A to make room.

On September 7, 2011, he carried a no hitter against the Kansas City Royals into the eighth inning.

=== Colorado Rockies ===
On January 16, 2012, Moscoso was traded, along with fellow pitcher Josh Outman, to the Colorado Rockies for outfielder Seth Smith. Moscoso went 3–2 with a 6.12 ERA with 50 innings in 23 appearances, 3 starts.

=== Kansas City Royals ===
The Kansas City Royals claimed Moscoso off waivers on November 2, 2012. The Royals released him on March 13, 2013.

=== Toronto Blue Jays ===
The Toronto Blue Jays announced that they had claimed Moscoso on waivers on March 16, 2013.

=== Chicago Cubs ===
On March 27, 2013, Moscoso was claimed on waivers by the Chicago Cubs.

=== San Francisco Giants ===
On July 26, 2013, Moscoso was traded to the San Francisco Giants for a player to be named later or cash considerations. In 13 appearances for the Giants, he compiled a 2–2 record and 5.10 ERA with 31 strikeouts across 30 innings pitched. Moscoso was designated for assignment on November 20. The next day, he elected free agency.

=== Yokohama DeNA BayStars ===
On December 26, 2013, it was announced that Moscoso had signed with the Yokohama DeNA BayStars of Nippon Professional Baseball for 2014.

=== Bravos de León ===
On May 7, 2017, Moscoso signed with the Bravos de León of the Mexican League. In 16 games (15 starts) for León, he posted a 7–3 record and 3.89 ERA with 60 strikeouts over 88 innings of work.

=== Los Angeles Dodgers ===
On February 7, 2018, Moscoso signed a minor league contract with the Los Angeles Dodgers. He appeared in 16 games (13 starts) for the Triple–A Oklahoma City Dodgers with a 4.90 ERA. Moscoso was released by the Dodgers organization on June 29.

=== Bravos de León (second stint) ===
On July 3, 2018, Moscoso signed with the Bravos de León of the Mexican League. He became a free agent following the season, but later re-signed with the team on April 23, 2019.

=== Pericos de Puebla ===
On July 2, 2019, Moscoso was traded to the Pericos de Puebla of the Mexican League. In 11 games (10 starts) for Puebla, he went 2–4 with a 6.15 ERA and 32 strikeouts across 52 2/3 innings pitched.

=== Bravos de León (third stint) ===
On November 29, 2019, Moscoso was traded back to the Bravos de León of the Mexican League. Moscoso was released by the Bravos on February 17, 2020. After the 2020 season, he played for the Tigres de Aragua of the Liga Venezolana de Béisbol Profesional. He additionally played for Venezuela in the 2021 Caribbean Series.

On December 20, 2021, Moscoso re-signed with the Bravos de León of the Mexican League for the 2022 season. He made 9 starts for the club and went 1–5 with a 8.47 ERA and 27 strikeouts. Moscoso became a free agent following the season.

=== Centauros de La Guaira ===
In 2025, Moscoso signed with the Centauros de La Guaira of the Venezuelan Major League.

== Pitching style ==
Moscoso throws three main pitches: a four-seam fastball (90–92), a curveball (77–79), and a changeup to left-handed hitters (80–81). He has experimented with a cut fastball and slider to right-handers, but he does not use them frequently. After he went to Japan, he learned a two-seam fastball.

== See also ==
- List of Major League Baseball players from Venezuela
