= Adrian Cárdenas =

American baseball player (born 1987)

- Second baseman
- Born: October 10, 1987 (age 38); Miami Lakes, Florida, U.S.
- Batted: Left Threw: Right

MLB debut
- May 7, 2012, for the Chicago Cubs

Last MLB appearance
- October 3, 2012, for the Chicago Cubs

MLB statistics
- Batting average: .183
- Home runs: 0
- Runs batted in: 2
- Stats at Baseball Reference

Teams
- Chicago Cubs (2012)

Adrian Cárdenas Rubio (born October 10, 1987) is an American former professional baseball second baseman. He played in Major League Baseball (MLB) for the Chicago Cubs.

== Background ==
Cárdenas' father Juan first attempted to defect from Cuba in 1966 at age 17. He hid on a boat docked at Matanzas Bay, but was caught in Havana and sent to a labor camp in Turiguanó. There he began writing to a former teacher, Hedda Schmidt, who he had met at the University of Havana. Three years later, they married. Juan successfully escaped Cuba in 1970, from Mariel. Schmidt soon joined him in Miami. They moved to San Francisco, and later divorced. Adrian Cárdenas is the son of Juan and his second wife, Aida Rubio.

== Career ==
=== Philadelphia Phillies ===
Cárdenas was selected by the Philadelphia Phillies in the first round of the 2006 Major League Baseball draft out of Monsignor Pace High School, where he graduated in the top ten percent of his class. Cárdenas won the 2006 Baseball America High School Player of the Year Award. He was assigned to the rookie-level Gulf Coast League Phillies, where in 41 games, he hit .318 with two home runs, 21 runs batted in (RBI) and 13 stolen bases.

Cárdenas spent 2007 with the Single-A Lakewood BlueClaws, where in 127 games, he hit .295 with 9 home runs, 79 RBI and 20 stolen bases. Cárdenas played in the 2007 All-Star Futures Game. Cárdenas began 2008 with the High-A Clearwater Threshers, where he played until he was traded.

=== Oakland Athletics ===
On July 17, 2008, the Phillies traded Cárdenas, Josh Outman and Matthew Spencer to the Oakland Athletics in exchange for Joe Blanton. He was assigned to the High-A Stockton Ports, but was promoted to the Double-A Midland RockHounds in August. In 109 total games, he hit .296 with five home runs, 40 RBI, and 17 stolen bases.

Cárdenas was a non-roster invitee to the Athletics' spring training camp in 2009. He split the season with Midland and the Triple-A Sacramento River Cats. In 130 games total, he hit .299 with four home runs and 79 RBI.

To start the 2010 season, Cárdenas was ranked ninth in Oakland's farm system according to Baseball America and again was at big-league camp as a non-roster invitee. He opened the year at Sacramento, but was demoted to Midland in June. Cárdenas was promoted back to Sacramento in August. In 109 games total, .304 with four home runs and 53 RBI. Cárdenas spent 2011 with Sacramento, where in 127 games, he hit .314 with 5 home runs, 51 RBI and 13 stolen bases. After the season, Cárdenas was added to the 40-man roster.

On January 26, 2012, Cárdenas was designated for assignment by the Athletics to make room on the 40-man roster for new signee Jonny Gomes.

=== Chicago Cubs ===
On February 6, 2012, Cárdenas was claimed off waivers by the Chicago Cubs. On May 7, he was recalled from the Triple-A Iowa Cubs, replacing Travis Wood. Cárdenas made his Major League debut that day as a pinch-hitter, lining out. His first start came the next day, at second base. Cárdenas' first hit, a double off of José Veras of the Milwaukee Brewers, came in his fifth game. He spent most of July with Iowa, but was recalled on July 31. After being optioned to Iowa on August 21, Cárdenas was recalled when the rosters expanded in September. He was used mostly off the bench, starting in only nine games. In 45 games with Chicago, Cárdenas hit .183 with two RBI. On October 25, Cárdenas was removed from the 40-man roster and sent outright to Iowa.

== After baseball ==
Cárdenas retired from baseball after the 2012 season because he no longer enjoyed the game. He returned to the creative writing and philosophy department at New York University, from which he had been taking part-time classes since 2010. He graduated in 2015, and returned to NYU to obtain a master of fine arts degree which he received in 2018. In 2019 he filmed a 12-minute short in Cuba which played at some film festivals.
