= Fautino de los Santos =

Dominican baseball player (born 1986)

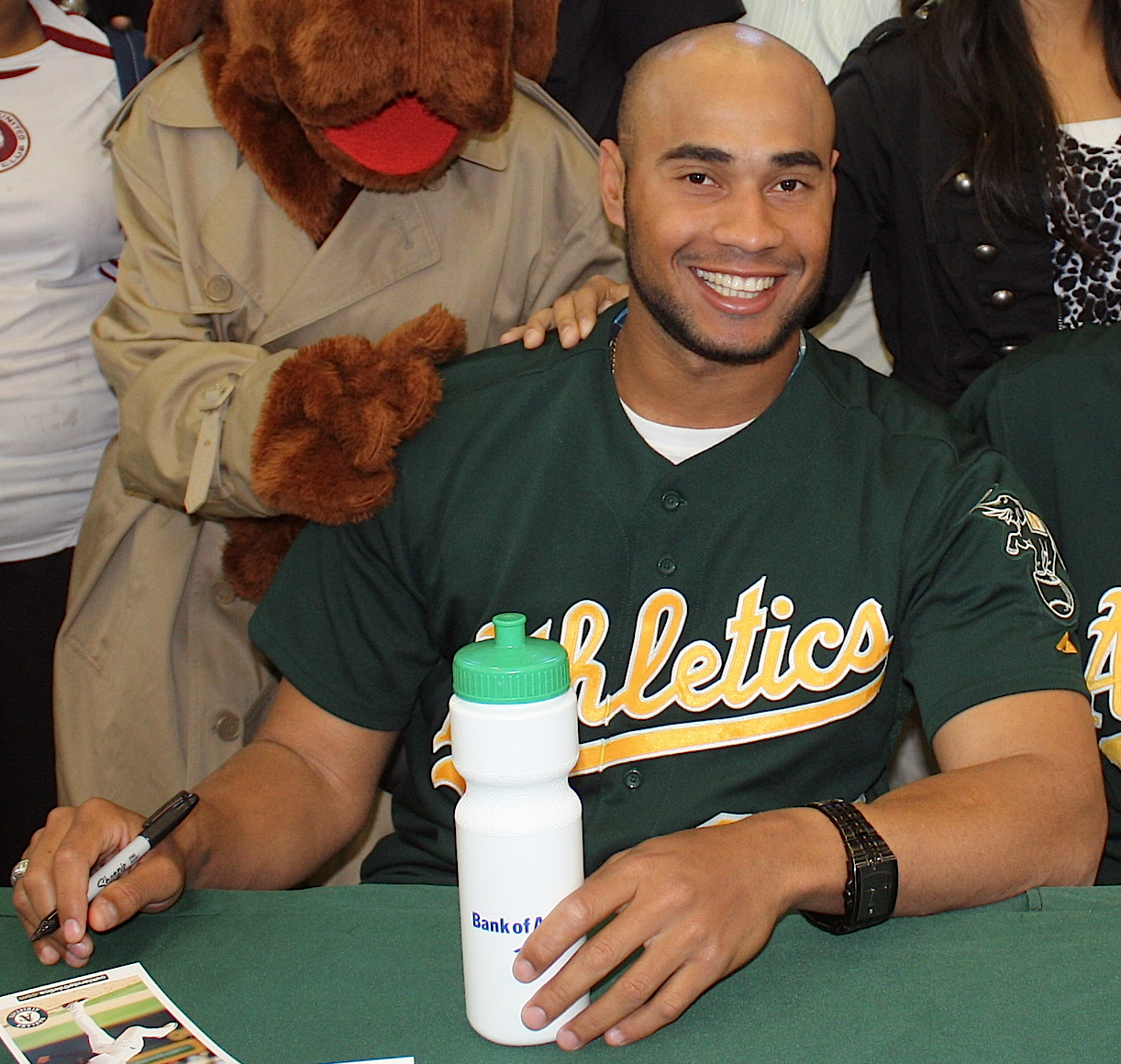
- de los Santos in 2011
- Relief pitcher
- Born: February 15, 1986 (age 40); Samana, Dominican Republic
- Batted: Right Threw: Right

MLB debut
- June 4, 2011, for the Oakland Athletics

Last MLB appearance
- April 23, 2012, for the Oakland Athletics

MLB statistics
- Win–loss record: 3–2
- Earned run average: 4.21
- Strikeouts: 46
- Stats at Baseball Reference

Teams
- Oakland Athletics (2011–2012)

Fautino De Los Santos (born February 15, 1986) is a Dominican former professional baseball relief pitcher. He played in Major League Baseball (MLB) for the Oakland Athletics in 2011 and 2012. He also played for the Musashi Heat Bears in Japan's Baseball Challenge League.

== Professional career ==
=== Chicago White Sox (2006–2008) ===
De los Santos began his career in the Chicago White Sox organization as a starting pitcher. He played well in the Dominican Summer League in 2006. In 2007, he split time between the Single-A Kannapolis Intimidators and High-A Winston-Salem Dash.

=== Oakland Athletics (2008–2012) ===
On January 3, 2008, de los Santos, Ryan Sweeney, and Gio González were traded to the Oakland Athletics in exchange for Nick Swisher. In 2008, he pitched for the Single-A Stockton Ports, but was out for much of the 2008 and 2009 seasons after undergoing Tommy John surgery. De los Santos finished 2009 with the rookie-level Arizona League Athletics and was added to the Athletics' 40-man roster after the season ended. De los Santos began 2010 back with the Stockton Ports and was promoted to the Double-A Midland RockHounds where he spent most of the season. Despite finishing 2010 with a disappointing 6.54 ERA in 25 appearances with Midland, De los Santos performed well in 2011 and quickly climbed the ranks. He was promoted to the Triple-A Sacramento River Cats on May 5.

On May 20, 2011, after just 6 innings pitched in 5 appearances in Triple-A, De los Santos received his first major-league promotion to the Athletics when Brandon McCarthy and Tyson Ross were placed on the disabled list. However, since both injured pitchers were in the team's starting rotation, De los Santos was sent back down again four days later without having made an appearance to make room for the promotion of a starter, Guillermo Moscoso, briefly becoming a phantom ballplayer. On June 3, de los Santos was again called up to the Athletics when Grant Balfour, another reliever, was placed on paternity leave. In his major-league debut on June 4, de los Santos faced one batter, the Red Sox's Jed Lowrie, and struck him out. In his second appearance, though, de los Santos gave up a hit and then two wild pitches in the same at bat, allowing a run in one inning. In an unexpected move, the Athletics decided to keep de los Santos with the team when Balfour returned from leave, because their bullpen had been depleted in the previous night's 14-inning game, designating backup infielder Andy LaRoche for assignment instead.

De los Santos made 34 appearances for Oakland during his rookie campaign, compiling a 3–2 record and 4.32 ERA with 43 strikeouts across 33 1/3 innings pitched. In 2012, de los Santos pitched in six games for Oakland, recording a 3.00 ERA with three strikeouts over three innings of work.

=== Milwaukee Brewers (2012) ===
On July 28, 2012, de los Santos was traded to the Milwaukee Brewers in exchange for catcher George Kottaras.

=== San Diego Padres (2013) ===
On February 6, 2013, de los Santos was claimed off waivers by the San Diego Padres. On May 11, de los Santos was designated for assignment following the promotion of Burch Smith. He cleared waivers and was placed on release waivers on May 14. De los Santos re-signed with the Padres on a minor league contract on May 25. He made two appearances down the stretch for the Triple-A Tucson Padres, logging an 0–1 record and 3.86 ERA with four strikeouts over 2 1/3 innings. De los Santos elected free agency following the season on November 4.

In 2013, de los Santos was one of 20 players named in connection to Biogenesis of America, who allegedly gave performance-enhancing drugs to professional players. On August 5, 2013, he agreed to a 50-game suspension for his role in the scandal while recovering from right shoulder surgery.

=== Diablos Rojos del México (2018) ===
On July 2, 2018, de los Santos signed with the Diablos Rojos del México of the Mexican League. In 15 appearances for México, he compiled an 0–3 record and 3.44 ERA with 25 strikeouts and 5 saves across 18 1/3 innings of relief. De los Santos was released by the Diablos on August 14.
