= Matusz =

Matusz is a surname commonly used in Poland, derived from the given name Mateusz (Matthew). Notable people with the surname include:

- Brian Matusz (1987–2025), American baseball pitcher
- Izabela Matusz (born 1974), Polish diplomat
