= Trystan Magnuson =

Canadian baseball player (born 1985)

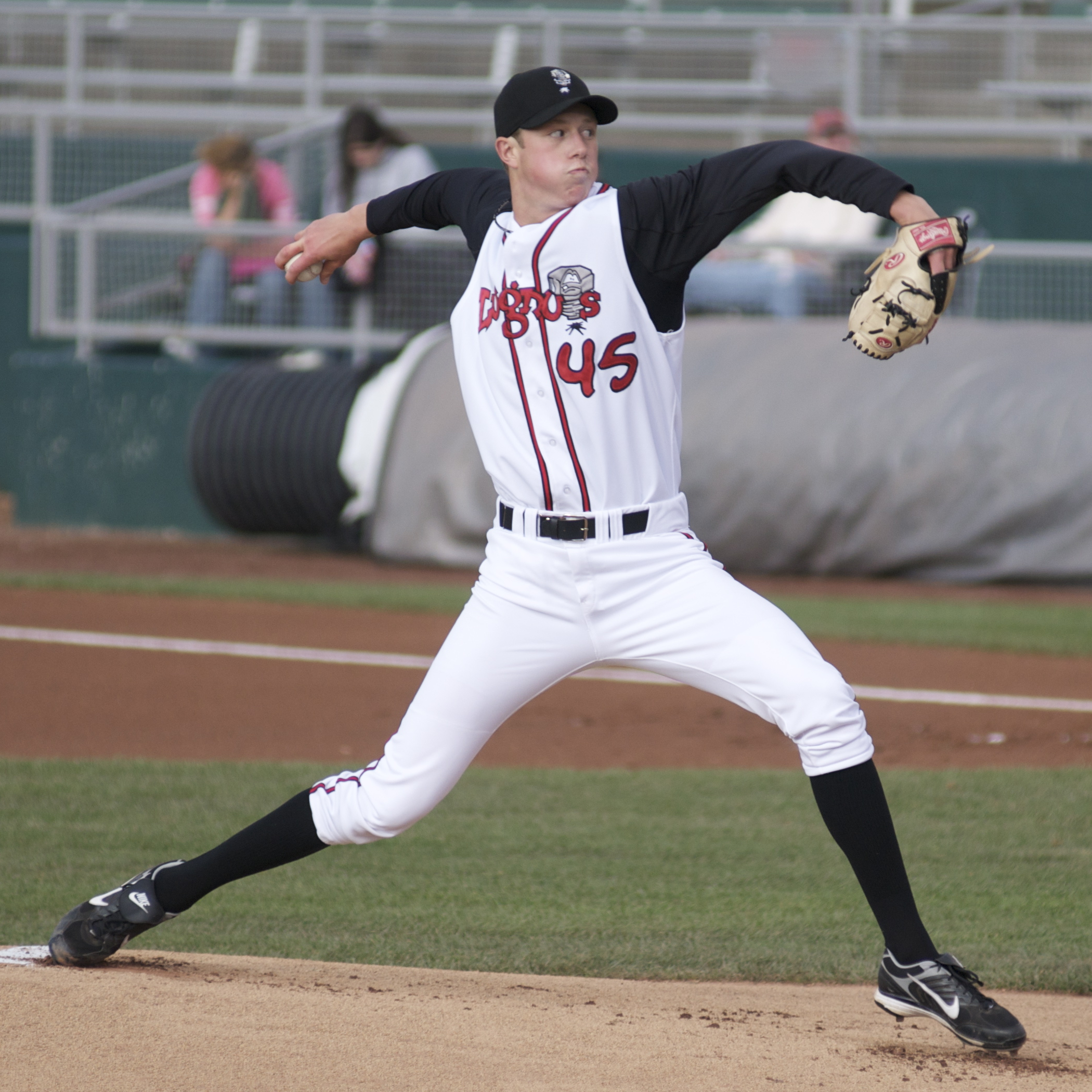
- Magnuson pitching for the Lansing Lugnuts in 2008
- Pitcher
- Born: June 6, 1985 (age 40); Vancouver, British Columbia, Canada
- Batted: Left Threw: Right

MLB debut
- May 17, 2011, for the Oakland Athletics

Last MLB appearance
- August 15, 2011, for the Oakland Athletics

MLB statistics
- Win–loss record: 0–0
- Earned run average: 6.14
- Strikeouts: 11
- Stats at Baseball Reference

Teams
- Oakland Athletics (2011)
Medals
Men's baseball
Representing Canada
Baseball World Cup
Bronze medal – third place	2009 Nettuno	Team

Trystan Stuart Gwyn Magnuson (born June 6, 1985) is a Canadian former professional baseball pitcher. He played in Major League Baseball (MLB) for the Oakland Athletics during the 2011 season.

== Career ==
=== Toronto Blue Jays ===
Magnuson was originally drafted by the Toronto Blue Jays with the 56th pick in the 2007 MLB draft from the University of Louisville. He played in the minor leagues with the Blue Jays until being traded to the Oakland Athletics along with Danny Farquhar for Rajai Davis after the 2010 season.

=== Oakland Athletics ===
Magnuson made his major league debut on May 17, 2011, against the Los Angeles Angels of Anaheim. He threw one inning and didn't give up a run. In nine appearances for Oakland during his rookie campaign, Magnuson recorded a 6.14 ERA with 11 strikeouts across 14 2/3 innings pitched. Magnuson was designated for assignment by the Athletics on November 2.

=== Toronto Blue Jays (second stint) ===
On November 4, 2011, Magnuson was traded back to the Toronto Blue Jays in exchange for cash considerations. On May 16, 2012, Magnuson was removed from the 40-man roster and sent outright to the Double-A New Hampshire Fisher Cats. He made 38 appearances split between New Hampshire and the High-A Dunedin Blue Jays, accumulating a combined 0-5 record and 3.20 ERA with 50 strikeouts and five saves across 50 2/3 innings pitched.

Magnuson started the 2013 season with Double-A New Hampshire, but struggled to a 9.00 ERA with 12 strikeouts over 10 appearances. He was released by the Blue Jays organization on May 7, 2013.

== Personal life ==
Magnuson was born in Vancouver and, due to his father's job, lived in England, Ottawa and Winnipeg before his family settled in Louisville, Kentucky.

He is the nephew of the late National Hockey League defenseman Keith Magnuson.

Magnuson graduated with his Master's in Engineering from Carnegie Mellon University in 2014 and now works as a mechanical engineer in the automotive industry.
