= Andrew Bailey (baseball) =

American baseball player and coach (born 1984)

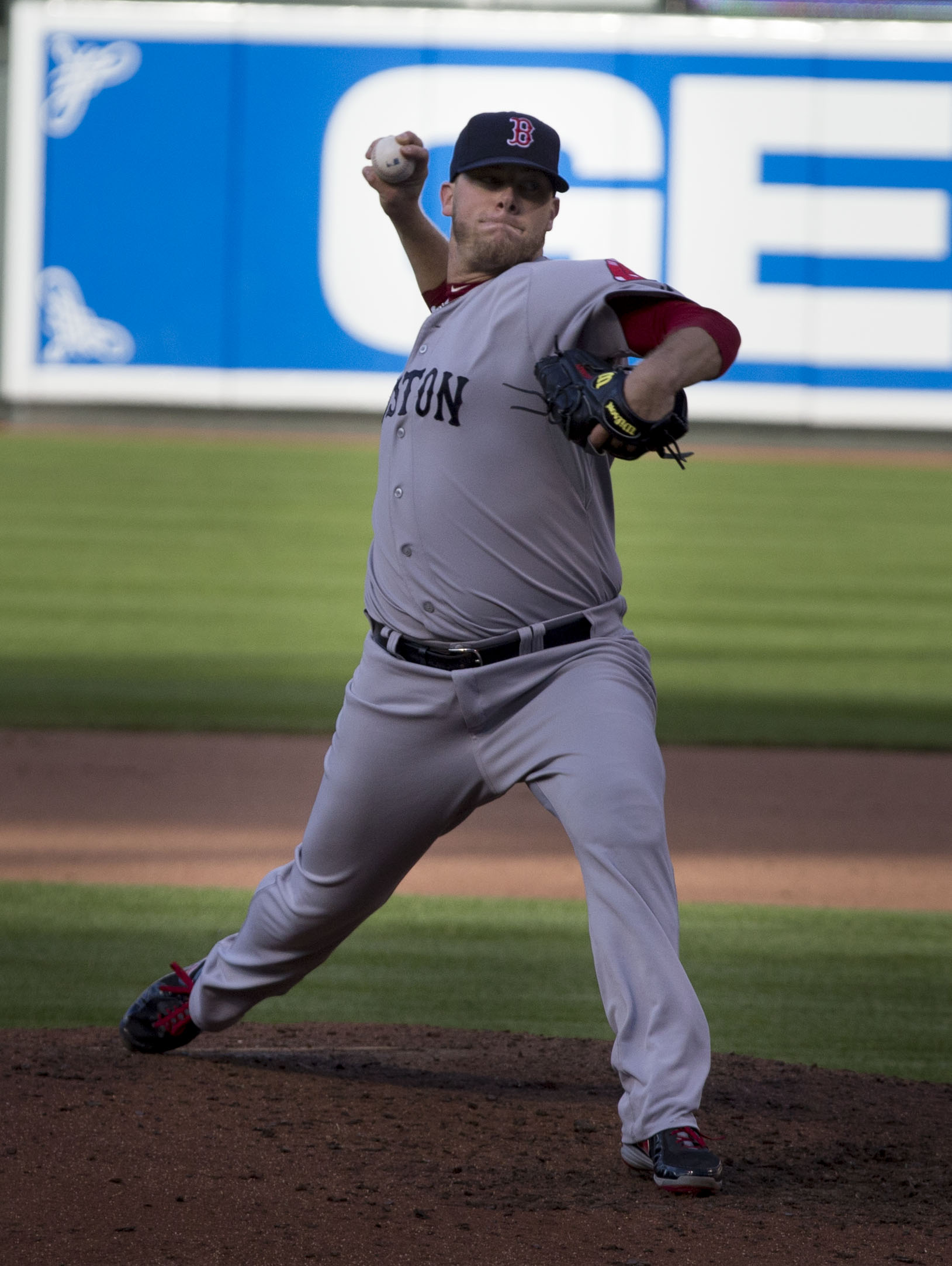
- Bailey with the Boston Red Sox in 2013

Boston Red Sox – No. 53
- Pitcher / Coach
- Born: May 31, 1984 (age 42); Voorhees, New Jersey, U.S.
- Batted: Right Threw: Right

MLB debut
- April 6, 2009, for the Oakland Athletics

Last MLB appearance
- August 15, 2017, for the Los Angeles Angels

MLB statistics
- Win–loss record: 16–14
- Earned run average: 3.12
- Strikeouts: 276
- Saves: 95
- Stats at Baseball Reference

Teams
- As player: Oakland Athletics (2009–2011); Boston Red Sox (2012–2013); New York Yankees (2015); Philadelphia Phillies (2016); Los Angeles Angels (2016–2017); As coach: Los Angeles Angels (2019); San Francisco Giants (2020–2023); Boston Red Sox (2024–present)

Career highlights and awards
- 2× All-Star (2009, 2010); AL Rookie of the Year (2009)

Andrew Scott Bailey (born May 31, 1984) is an American former professional baseball pitcher and current pitching coach for the Boston Red Sox of Major League Baseball (MLB). As a player, he played in MLB for the Oakland Athletics, Los Angeles Angels, Red Sox, New York Yankees, and Philadelphia Phillies. He played college baseball for Wagner College and was selected by the Athletics in the sixth round of the 2006 MLB draft. He made his MLB debut in 2009 and won that season's American League Rookie of the Year Award. He was an All-Star in 2009 and 2010 while he was the closer for the Athletics. He has also been a pitching coach for the San Francisco Giants.

== Baseball career ==
=== High school and college ===
Bailey was born in Voorhees, New Jersey, and first played baseball at Paul VI High School in Haddon Township, New Jersey. He attended Wagner College in Staten Island. Bailey was selected by the Milwaukee Brewers in the 16th round (475th overall) of the 2005 Major League Baseball draft, but decided to return to Wagner for his senior year and earn a degree in business administration. His Wagner number 17 jersey was retired in January 2010, which made him only the fourth former student-athlete to be honored in that way.

=== Oakland Athletics ===
The Oakland Athletics selected Bailey in the sixth round, with the 188th overall selection, of the 2006 Major League Baseball draft. He signed with Oakland for a signing bonus of $135,000.

Bailey made the Athletics Opening Day 25-man roster for the 2009 season, and made his major league debut on April 6, 2009, pitching a scoreless inning against the Los Angeles Angels of Anaheim. Bailey was selected to represent the Athletics in the 2009 MLB All-Star Game in St. Louis. He was the 2009 August AL Rookie of the Month. He broke the Athletics rookie save record on September 12 against the Minnesota Twins with his 24th save of the season.

After a final line of 26 saves (9th in the AL) and a 1.84 ERA and a 0.876 WHIP, Bailey was named 2009 American League Rookie of the Year on November 16, 2009.

He was selected again to the All-Star team in 2010, which he finished with 25 saves (10th in the AL), a 1.47 ERA and a 0.959 WHIP.

On September 12, 2011, Bailey was hit right above the temple by a line drive in batting practice. He felt fine, passed concussion tests, and sat out the next few days. He returned to action to face the Tigers a few games later. His ERA ballooned to 3.24, though he did finish with 24 saves.

=== Boston Red Sox ===
On December 28, 2011, Bailey and Ryan Sweeney were traded from Oakland to the Boston Red Sox for Josh Reddick and two minor leaguers. On April 4, 2012, it was announced that Bailey would require reconstructive surgery on his right thumb and that he would begin the 2012 season on the disabled list. Bailey made his 2012 debut with the Red Sox on August 14, pitching a third of an inning in a loss to Baltimore. He finished the 2012 season with 15 1/3 innings pitched, a 7.04 ERA, and a 1.89 WHIP.

Bailey began the 2013 season as a middle reliever with the Red Sox, but when closer Joel Hanrahan was injured in mid-April, Bailey took over the closer job. He was named the American League player of the week for the week of April 21. Bailey compiled 8 saves, a 3–1 record and a 3.77 ERA in 30 appearances until he suffered a shoulder injury that kept him from playing for the rest of the season. After the All-Star Break, MRIs confirmed there was a torn capsule and damaged labrum in his throwing shoulder. He underwent shoulder surgery on July 24, ending his 2013 season. After the 2013 season, Bailey was non-tendered by the Red Sox, making him a free agent.

=== New York Yankees ===
On February 22, 2014, Bailey signed a minor league deal with the New York Yankees with a $2.5 million salary if he made the major league roster, and a club option for the 2015 season. After numerous setbacks in his recovery from his shoulder injury, Bailey was ruled out for the 2014 season on August 17. The Yankees signed him to a new minor league contract on November 7, 2014, after declining his 2015 option a few days earlier.

The Yankees promoted Bailey to the major leagues on September 1, 2015. On September 2, he entered in the seventh inning at Boston, his first appearance in a game in two years. In 10 appearances, he posted a 5.19 ERA. On November 3, the Yankees declined Bailey's option for the 2016 season, making him a free agent.

=== Philadelphia Phillies ===
Bailey signed a minor league contract with the Philadelphia Phillies in December 2015, receiving an invitation to spring training. He was called up to the Phillies on April 20, 2016. He was designated for assignment on August 2, and released on August 6.

=== Los Angeles Angels ===
On August 13, 2016, Bailey signed a minor league deal with the Los Angeles Angels. Bailey was called up in late August and collected six saves for the Angels in 12 games, with a 2.38 ERA and a 0.971 WHIP. On November 9, Bailey signed a one-year, $1 million contract to remain with the Angels. His 2017 season was cut short due to a shoulder injury, limiting him to four games.

== Post-playing career ==
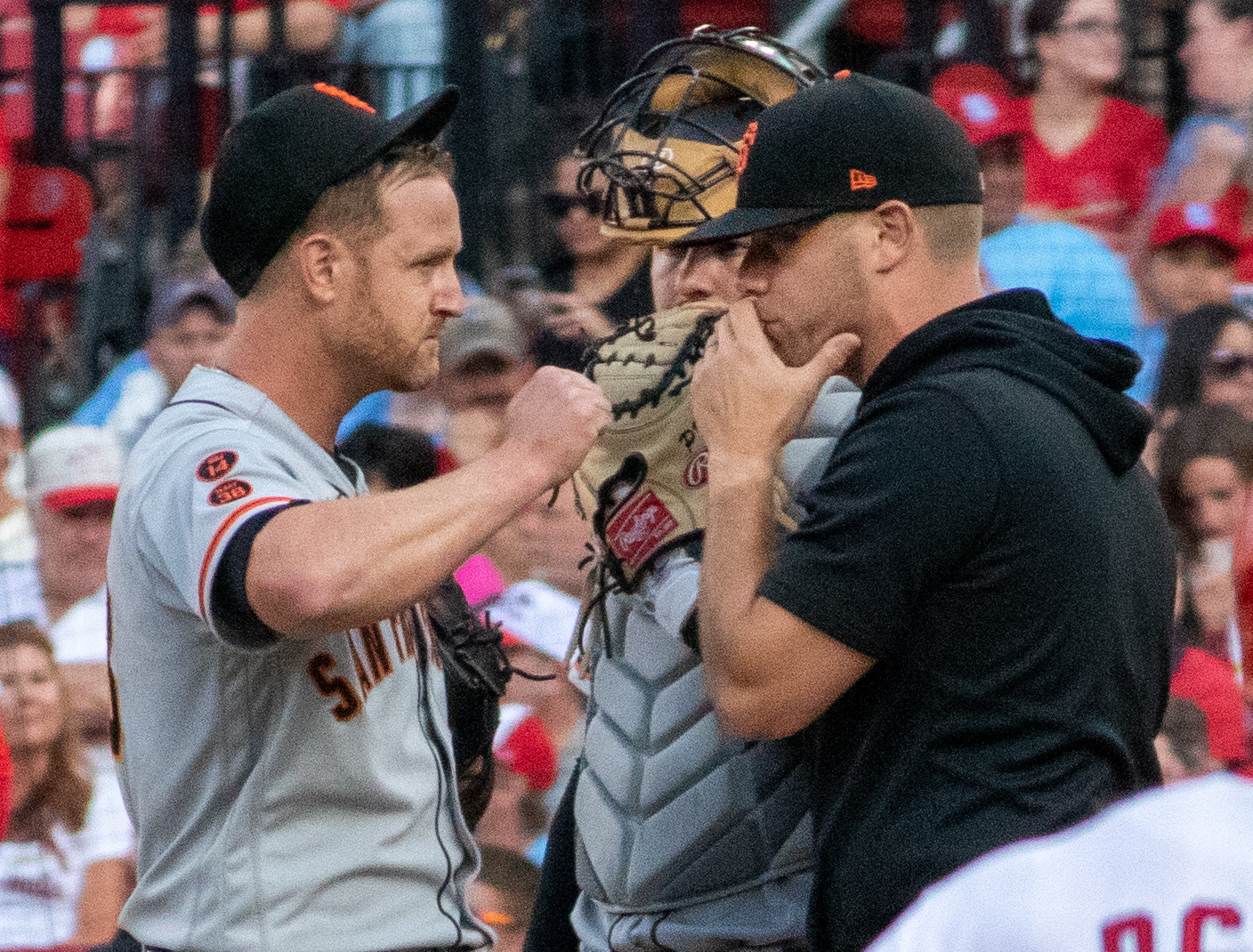
Bailey (right) conferring with pitcher Alex Cobb in 2023

Bailey announced his retirement on February 26, 2018, to take up the job of instant replay coordinator and coaching assistant for the Los Angeles Angels. Bailey spent the 2019 season as the Angels bullpen coach.

Prior to the 2020 season, Bailey was hired by the San Francisco Giants as their pitching coach.

In November 2023, Bailey was hired as pitching coach by the Red Sox, replacing Dave Bush, who had been dismissed following the 2023 season.

== Philanthropy ==
Bailey serves as Director of Development for the Strike 3 Foundation, a non-profit charity dedicated to pediatric cancer research, founded by former Athletics and Red Sox teammate Craig Breslow.

Sporting positions
| Preceded by Dave Bush | Boston Red Sox pitching coach 2024–present | Succeeded by Incumbent |
