= David DeJesus =

American baseball player (born 1979)

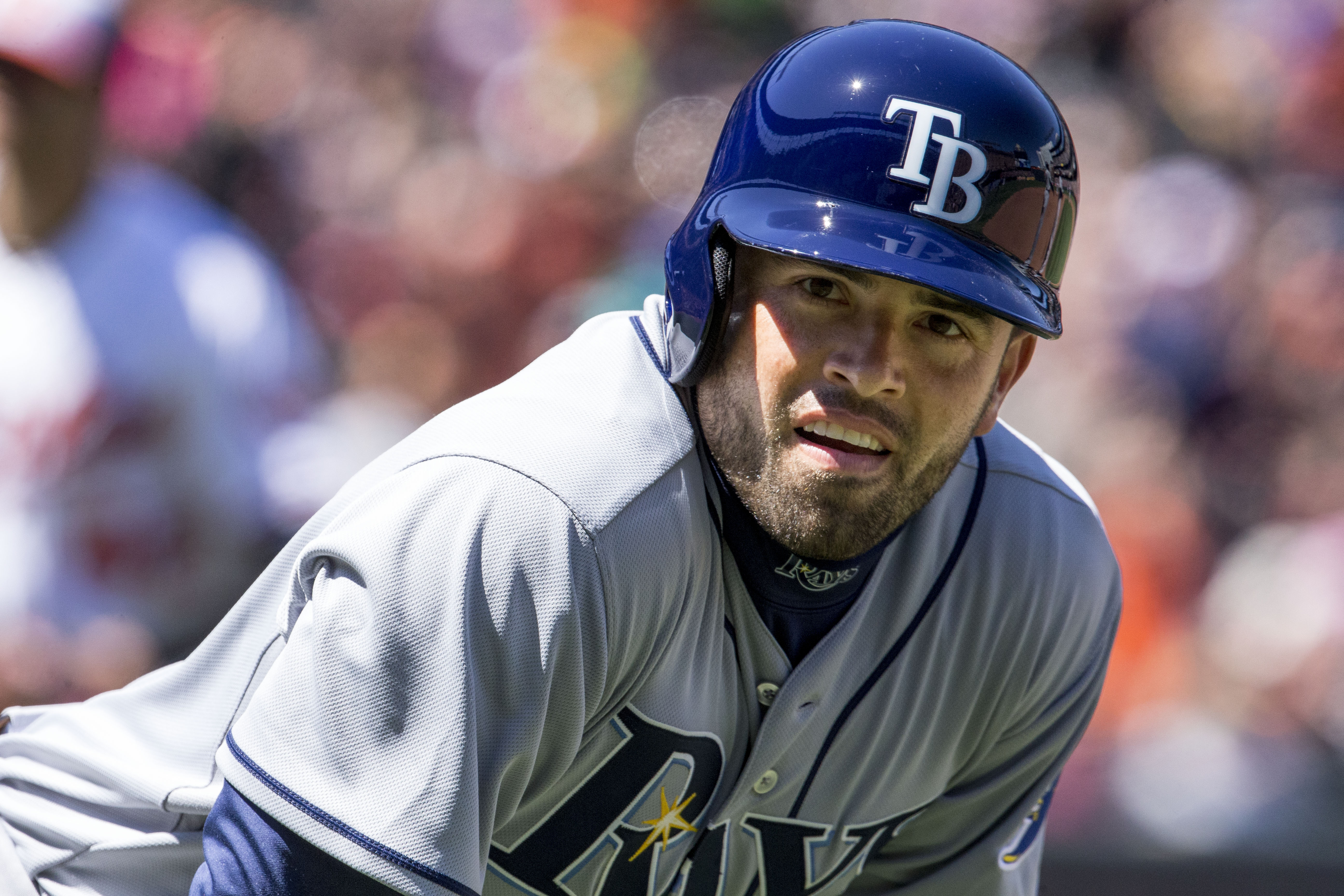
- DeJesus with the Tampa Bay Rays in 2014
- Outfielder
- Born: December 20, 1979 (age 46); Brooklyn, New York, U.S.
- Batted: Left Threw: Left

MLB debut
- September 2, 2003, for the Kansas City Royals

Last MLB appearance
- September 23, 2015, for the Los Angeles Angels of Anaheim

MLB statistics
- Batting average: .275
- Home runs: 99
- Runs batted in: 573
- Stats at Baseball Reference

Teams
- Kansas City Royals (2003–2010); Oakland Athletics (2011); Chicago Cubs (2012–2013); Washington Nationals (2013); Tampa Bay Rays (2013–2015); Los Angeles Angels of Anaheim (2015)

David Christopher DeJesus (/dəˈheɪsuːs/; born December 20, 1979) is an American former professional baseball outfielder. He played in Major League Baseball (MLB) for the Kansas City Royals, Oakland Athletics, Chicago Cubs, Washington Nationals, Tampa Bay Rays and Los Angeles Angels of Anaheim. DeJesus, who is of Puerto Rican descent, and was an analyst for the Cubs with NBC Sports Chicago from 2017–2019.

== Career ==
DeJesus was raised in Manalapan Township, New Jersey, and played high school baseball at Manalapan High School. He was drafted out of high school by the New York Mets in the 43rd round of the 1997 Major League Baseball draft. DeJesus did not sign with the Mets, opting instead to attend Rutgers University. In 1998 he played collegiate summer baseball in the Cape Cod Baseball League (CCBL) for the Bourne Braves, and returned to the CCBL in 1999 with the Chatham A's where he was named a league all-star. DeJesus was drafted in the fourth round of the 2000 Major League Baseball draft by the Kansas City Royals.

=== Kansas City Royals ===
DeJesus made his Major League debut on September 2, 2003. After Carlos Beltrán was traded to the Houston Astros in 2004, DeJesus became the starting center fielder for the Royals. He finished sixth in the 2004 Rookie of the Year voting. On March 9, 2006, DeJesus signed a five-year, $13.8 million contract extension with the Royals through 2010, with a club option for the 2011 season. On June 15, 2008, De Jesus hit the first grand slam of his career. This prompted the game caller to remark, "He smashed the living DeJesus out of that ball!"

In 2010, DeJesus was in threat of being traded along with his fellow starting outfielders, Scott Podsednik and José Guillén, who were both traded. DeJesus, on the other hand, tore a tendon on his right thumb crashing into a fence in Yankee Stadium on July 22 trying to catch a fly ball by New York Yankees shortstop Derek Jeter that eventually ended up being an inside-the-park home run for Jeter and had season-ending surgery. DeJesus was hoping to return to the team in September, but instead was moved to the 60-Day DL. He finished the 2010 season batting .318 with 5 home runs and 37 RBIs in 352 at-bats.

On October 2, 2010, the Royals picked up his $6 million club option for 2011.

=== Oakland Athletics ===
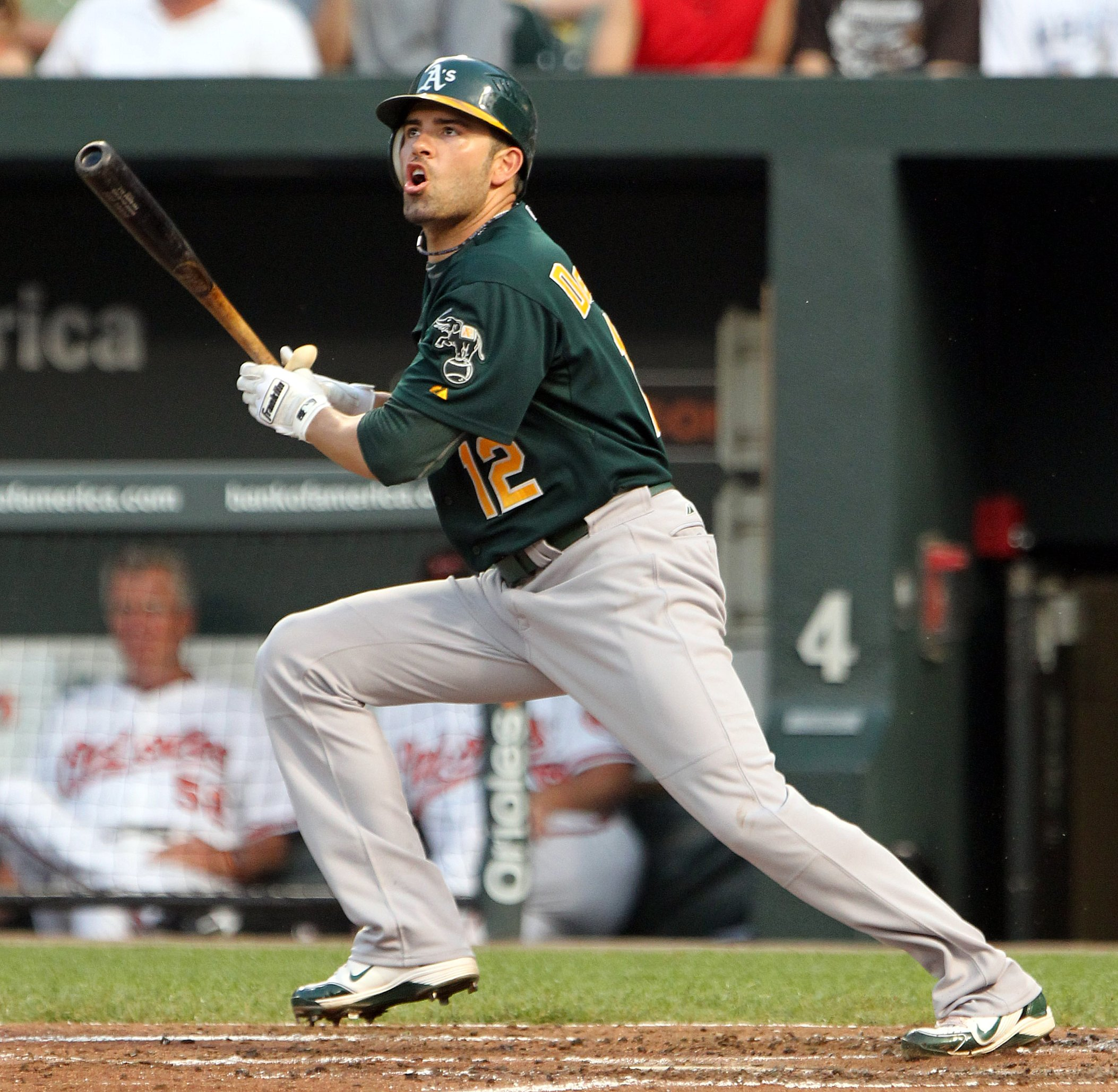
DeJesus during his tenure with the Oakland Athletics in 2011

On November 11, 2010, DeJesus was traded to the Oakland Athletics for pitcher Vin Mazzaro and minor league pitcher Justin Marks. He finished his lone season with Oakland batting .240 with 10 home runs and 46 RBIs in 131 games.

=== Chicago Cubs ===
On November 30, 2011, DeJesus signed a two-year deal worth $10 million, to be the primary right fielder for the Chicago Cubs.

In 2013, due to the signing of Nate Schierholtz, DeJesus moved to center field for the 2013 season.

=== Washington Nationals ===
On August 19, 2013, DeJesus was traded to the Washington Nationals for a player to be named later. He appeared in three games for the Nationals, going 0-for-3.

=== Tampa Bay Rays ===
On August 23, the Nationals traded DeJesus to the Tampa Bay Rays for future considerations. DeJesus got off to a hot start with the Rays culminating in a walk-off single in the 18th inning against the Baltimore Orioles scoring Desmond Jennings.

On November 6, 2013, DeJesus re-signed with the Rays, inking a two-year, $10.5 million deal. The Rays, without a true designated hitter, put DeJesus in that role in 2014, where he appeared the most. On June 19, DeJesus was placed on the disabled list with a left hand fracture on a check swing the previous day. He was hitting .269 with 5 HR and 17 RBI in 62 games before the injury. He was leading the team with a .367 OBP and a .440 SLG.

=== Los Angeles Angels of Anaheim ===
On July 28, 2015, DeJesus was traded to the Los Angeles Angels of Anaheim for minor league pitcher Eduar Lopez.

=== Retirement ===
On March 22, 2017, DeJesus announced his retirement.

== Personal life ==
DeJesus was married to former high school art teacher and The Amazing Race 23 contestant Kim DeJesus (née Iliff). Together, they have a son named David Kingston DeJesus Jr. He goes by the name Kingston. The couple divorced in 2023.
