= 2012 Oakland Athletics season =

2012 Oakland Athletics
- American League West champions
- League: American League
- Division: West
- Ballpark: O.co Coliseum
- City: Oakland, California
- Record: 94–68 (.580)
- Divisional place: 1st
- Owners: Lewis Wolff, John Fisher
- General managers: Billy Beane
- Managers: Bob Melvin
- Television: Comcast SportsNet California (Glen Kuiper, Ray Fosse, Scott Hatteberg)
- Radio: KGMZ (Ken Korach, Vince Cotroneo, Ray Fosse)

The Oakland Athletics' 2012 season was the organization's 45th in Oakland, California and the 112th in club history. The team finished with a final record of 94–68, claiming first place in the American League West and reaching the postseason for the first time since 2006. After winning their last game of the season, they took sole possession of the West for the first time all year, overtaking the Texas Rangers. The A's had trailed Texas by 13 games on June 30, and had a five-game deficit with nine days left in the season. The 2012 team, which led the league with 15 walk-off wins, managed this with the second-lowest payroll in baseball, at $59.5 million. They lost in five games to the Detroit Tigers in the Division Series.

== Season summary ==
Following a 74–88 finish in 2011, general manager Billy Beane largely dismantled the team's starting rotation. All-Star starters Trevor Cahill and Gio González were traded to the Arizona Diamondbacks and Washington Nationals, respectively. The trades yielded a number of highly touted prospects; among these were catcher Derek Norris, starting pitchers Tommy Milone, Brad Peacock and Jarrod Parker, and reliever Ryan Cook. An additional trade sent All-Star closer Andrew Bailey (along with Ryan Sweeney) to the Boston Red Sox in exchange for outfielder Josh Reddick and a pair of prospects. With power-hitting outfielder Josh Willingham becoming a free agent, Beane's next move was to sign highly regarded Cuban outfielder Yoenis Céspedes on February 13, 2012. The 4-year, $36 million deal seemed out of character, especially given the Athletics' low payroll and generally frugal nature. The move followed a number of earlier (and lower-cost) free-agent signings, including the additions of veterans Jonny Gomes, Seth Smith, and Bartolo Colón.

Despite these additions, expectations were still not high for the Athletics in 2012, as a number of experts picked the Athletics to lose as many as 100 games in the highly competitive AL West. The A's managed to play winning baseball through mid-May and held a 22–21 record on May 21, before a nine-game losing streak brought them down to a season-low eight games under the .500 mark. In Bob Melvin's first full season as manager, the team began to gel in the month of June. Between June 2 (the day the nine-game losing streak ended) and June 30, the A's posted a 15–12 record; then erased their deficit with a 19-5 surge in July, highlighted by the first-ever four-game sweep of the New York Yankees in Oakland. This stellar play put the once-dead Athletics into the heat of the AL West race: while they had trailed the division-leading Rangers by 13 games on June 30, they were only 3.5 back on July 28. A 5–8 start to August, however, widened the Rangers' lead to six games. Additionally, veteran pitcher Bartolo Colón was suspended after testing positive for synthetic testosterone on August 22. Facing these problems, the A's won 13 of their final 15 August games, due in part to the season debut of injured ace Brett Anderson and capped off with a 20–2 victory over the Boston Red Sox on August 31.

The A's continued to play well through the first days of September, though they began to decline as the month progressed. On September 5, Opening Day starter Brandon McCarthy was seriously injured when a line drive impacted his head. The injury, which resulted in an epidural hemorrhage, a brain contusion, and a skull fracture, was considered life-threatening for a number of days. Although McCarthy made a recovery over the following two months, the injury ended his season. An additional injury to Brett Anderson further impacted the A's starting rotation. From September 13 to 24 the A's would lose six out of eight games, with the final loss being a 5–4 defeat at the hands of the Rangers that put the A's five games behind the division leaders (with only nine left to play), though the A's were not mathematically eliminated. After winning two of their next three games against the Rangers, they then swept the Seattle Mariners (highlighted by their last regular-season walk-off), while the Rangers lost two games out of three to the division-rival Los Angeles Angels. With the Rangers leading the A's by only two games, the teams faced off in Oakland for the final three games of the season. The A's took the first two games by scores of 4–3 and 3–1, respectively; the first win clinched a postseason berth for the Athletics, while the second momentarily tied the A's with the Rangers for first place and set up a winner-take-all game for the division crown. In the final game, a 5–1 Rangers lead after the 2nd inning was not enough as the Athletics scored six runs in the 4th (including two off a fly ball that was misplayed by Josh Hamilton) and scored five more runs in the eventual 12–5 victory.

Having secured the division championship, the Athletics faced the Detroit Tigers in the 2012 American League Division Series. The A's were shut down by Detroit ace Justin Verlander in Game 1, and followed that loss with a 5–4 defeat in Game 2. The Athletics, now down 2–0 in a best-of-five series, returned to Oakland for Game 3. Brett Anderson saved the Athletics' season by shutting out the Tigers in a 2–0 Athletics victory. Then, trailing 3–1 heading into the bottom of the 9th inning, Oakland scored three runs (the final on a Coco Crisp walk-off single) to capture a come-from-behind 4–3 victory in Game 4. The A's comeback was not to be, however, as a dominant outing by Verlander ended the A's season in Game 5.

The Athletics' 94–68 record in 2012 was their best in nearly a decade. Manager Bob Melvin and General Manager Billy Beane were honored with the Greatness in Baseball Yearly (GIBBY) Award as the Manager of the Year and Executive of the Year, respectively.

== Regular season ==
=== American League West ===
AL West
Team	W	L	Pct.	GB	Home	Road
Oakland Athletics	94	68	.580	—	50‍–‍31	44‍–‍37
Texas Rangers	93	69	.574	1	50‍–‍31	43‍–‍38
Los Angeles Angels	89	73	.549	5	46‍–‍35	43‍–‍38
Seattle Mariners	75	87	.463	19	40‍–‍41	35‍–‍46

=== American League Wild Card ===
Division winners
Team	W	L	Pct.
New York Yankees	95	67	.586
Oakland Athletics	94	68	.580
Detroit Tigers	88	74	.543

Wild Card teams (Top 2 teams qualify for postseason)
Team	W	L	Pct.	GB
Texas Rangers	93	69	.574	—
Baltimore Orioles	93	69	.574	—
Tampa Bay Rays	90	72	.556	3
Los Angeles Angels	89	73	.549	4
Chicago White Sox	85	77	.525	8
Seattle Mariners	75	87	.463	18
Toronto Blue Jays	73	89	.451	20
Kansas City Royals	72	90	.444	21
Boston Red Sox	69	93	.426	24
Cleveland Indians	68	94	.420	25
Minnesota Twins	66	96	.407	27

=== Record against opponents ===
2012 American League record Source: MLB Standings Grid – 2012
Team	BAL	BOS	CWS	CLE	DET	KC	LAA	MIN	NYY	OAK	SEA	TB	TEX	TOR	NL
Baltimore	–	13–5	6–2	4–4	3–3	5–4	2–7	5–2	9–9	4–5	8–1	10–8	2–5	11–7	11–7
Boston	5–13	–	6–2	5–3	5–5	4–3	0–6	4–3	5–13	1–8	5–4	9–9	2–6	7–11	11–7
Chicago	2–6	2–6	–	11–7	6–12	6–12	3–5	14–4	5–2	3–3	8–1	4–3	6–3	6–4	9–9
Cleveland	4–4	3–5	7–11	–	10–8	8–10	5–4	6–12	1–5	2–8	4–4	4–4	4–5	2–4	8–10
Detroit	3–3	5–5	12–6	8–10	–	13–5	5–5	10–8	4–6	4–3	1–5	5–2	3–7	4–2	11–7
Kansas City	4–5	3–4	12–6	10–8	5–13	–	4–5	7–11	3–4	5–4	1–7	4–2	4–5	2–6	8–10
Los Angeles	7–2	6–0	5–3	4–5	5–5	5–4	–	6–3	4–5	9–10	11–8	1–9	10–9	4–4	12–6
Minnesota	2–5	3–4	4–14	12–6	8–10	11–7	3–6	–	3–4	4–5	2–8	1–5	2–8	2–5	9–9
New York	9–9	13–5	2–5	5–1	6–4	4–3	5–4	4–3	–	5–5	6–3	8–10	4–3	11–7	13–5
Oakland	5–4	8–1	3–3	8–2	3–4	4–5	10–9	5–4	5–5	–	12–7	5–4	11–8	5–4	10–8
Seattle	1–8	4–5	1–8	4–4	5–1	7–1	8–11	8–2	3–6	7–12	–	4–6	9–10	6–3	8–10
Tampa Bay	8–10	9–9	3–4	4–4	2–5	2–4	9–1	5–1	10–8	4–5	6–4	–	5–4	14–4	9–9
Texas	5–2	6–2	3–6	5–4	7–3	5–4	9–10	8–2	3–4	8–11	10–9	4–5	–	6–3	14–4
Toronto	7–11	11–7	4–6	4–2	2–4	6–2	4–4	5–2	7–11	4–5	3–6	4–14	3–6	–	9–9

- Source: MLB Standings Grid – 2012

== Offseason ==
- At the end of the regular season, the club quickly dismissed bench coach Joel Skinner, pitching coach Ron Romanick, and hitting coach Gerald Perry.
- Oakland received outfield prospect Eliezer Mesa from Colorado as the "player to be named later" from the Mark Ellis trade on June 30.
- On October 4, 2011, Mets' third base coach Chip Hale signed a two-year deal to become bench coach under Bob Melvin.
- After spending one year in Boston, pitching coach Curt Young returned on October 21 on a one-year deal.
- On October 25, 2011, right-handed pitcher Evan Scribner and outfielder Cedric Hunter were claimed off waivers from San Diego and later outrighted to AAA. That same day, RHP Michael Wuertz was released.
- On November 4, 2011, RHP Trystan Magnuson was designated for assignment and traded back to Toronto for cash considerations.
- On November 18, outfielder Jermaine Mitchell was protected from the Rule 5 draft by being added to the 40-man roster.
- Former big leaguer Chili Davis was named the A's new hitting coach on November 25, 2011.
- On December 9, 2011, the team traded pitchers Trevor Cahill and Craig Breslow to Arizona for pitchers Jarrod Parker and Ryan Cook and outfielder Collin Cowgill.
- Next to go were pitchers Gio González and minor leaguer Robert Gilliam, traded to Washington on December 23, 2011, for pitchers A. J. Cole, Tommy Milone, and Brad Peacock, and catcher Derek Norris.
- To make room for the prospects yielded in the Gonzalez trade, on December 23 assignment designations were given to outfielder Jai Miller (traded to Baltimore) and catcher Landon Powell (cleared waiver and assigned to AAA).
- On December 28, 2011, former closer Andrew Bailey and outfielder Ryan Sweeney were dealt to the Boston Red Sox in exchange for outfielder Josh Reddick and minor-leaguers Miles Head and Raúl Alcántara.
- Outfielder Coco Crisp re-signed with the team on January 3, 2012, on a two-year, $14 million deal.
- In January, the Athletics signed pitcher Bartolo Colón (January 14) and outfielder Jonny Gomes (January 20). Infielder Adrian Cárdenas was removed from the 40-man roster in favor of Gomes on January 26; Cardenas was claimed off waivers by the Chicago Cubs the next month.
- On January 16, 2012, A's traded pitchers Josh Outman and Guillermo Moscoso to Colorado for outfielder Seth Smith.
- On February 20, the team signed Manny Ramirez to a minor league contract.
- On March 3, 2012, the team announced the official signing of defecting Cuban outfielder Yoenis Céspedes to a 4-year, $36 million contract.

=== Notable 2011 departures ===
Player	Position	OAK Tenure	New Team	Stats
Andrew Bailey	P	2009	BOS	4.1 IP, 2.08 ERA
Craig Breslow	P	2009	ARI/BOS	53 IP, 2.55 ERA
Trevor Cahill	P	2009	ARI	9–10, 156.1 IP, 3.86 ERA
David DeJesus	OF	2011	CHC	.267 AVG, 6 HR, 38 RBI
Gio González	P	2008	WAS	16–7, 159.1 IP, 3.28 ERA
Rich Harden	P	2003–2008, 2011	FA	Will miss 2012 season (Injury)
Hideki Matsui	DH	2011	TB/FA	.147, 2 HR, 7 RBI
Josh Outman	P	2008	COL	0–3, 31 IP, 9.00 ERA
Ryan Sweeney	OF	2008	BOS	.260 AVG, 16 RBI
Josh Willingham	OF	2011	MIN	.258 AVG, 31 HR, 91 RBI

Stats as of Aug 25

== Roster ==
2012 Oakland Athletics
Roster
Pitchers: 39 Jeremy Accardo; 49 Brett Anderson; 50 Grant Balfour; 54 Travis Blackley; 13 Jerry Blevins; 38 Andrew Carignan; 60 Jesse Chavez; 21 Bartolo Colón; 48 Ryan Cook; 60 Fautino de los Santos; 67,62 Sean Doolittle; 65 Pedro Figueroa; 40 Brian Fuentes; 45 Graham Godfrey; 64 A. J. Griffin; 32 Brandon McCarthy; 53 Jim Miller; 57 Tommy Milone; 40 Pat Neshek; 77 Jordan Norberto; 11 Jarrod Parker; 66 Tyson Ross; 58 Evan Scribner; 67 Dan Straily; 54 Rich Thompson	Catchers: 14 George Kottaras; 36 Derek Norris; 26 Anthony Recker; 8 Kurt Suzuki; Infielders: 14 Brandon Allen; 10 Daric Barton; 22 Chris Carter; 20 Josh Donaldson; 5 Stephen Drew; 18 Brandon Hicks; 35 Luke Hughes; 18,7 Brandon Inge; 25 Kila Ka'aihue; 37 Brandon Moss; 2 Cliff Pennington; 17 Adam Rosales; 28 Eric Sogard; 19 Jemile Weeks	Outfielders: 52 Yoenis Céspedes; 12 Collin Cowgill; 4 Coco Crisp; 31 Jonny Gomes; 16 Josh Reddick; 15 Seth Smith; 23 Michael Taylor	Manager: 6 Bob Melvin; Coaches: 30 Chili Davis (hitting); 3 Mike Gallego (third base); 5,8 Chip Hale (bench); Chris Pittaro (special assistant); 44 Rick Rodriguez (bullpen); 46 Tye Waller (first base); 41 Curt Young (pitching)

== Player stats ==
=== Batting ===
Note: G = Games played; AB = At bats; R = Runs; H = Hits; 2B = Doubles; 3B = Triples; HR = Home runs; RBI = Runs batted in; SB = Stolen bases; BB = Walks; AVG = Batting average; SLG = Slugging average

Player	G	AB	R	H	2B	3B	HR	RBI	SB	BB	AVG	SLG
Josh Reddick	156	611	85	148	29	5	32	85	11	55	.242	.463
Yoenis Céspedes	129	487	70	142	25	5	23	82	16	43	.292	.505
Coco Crisp	120	455	68	118	25	7	11	46	39	45	.259	.418
Jemile Weeks	118	444	54	98	15	8	2	20	16	50	.221	.304
Cliff Pennington	125	418	50	90	18	2	6	28	15	35	.215	.311
Seth Smith	125	383	55	92	23	2	14	52	2	50	.240	.420
Brandon Inge	74	283	31	64	13	0	11	52	0	24	.226	.389
Jonny Gomes	99	279	46	73	10	0	18	47	3	44	.262	.491
Josh Donaldson	75	274	34	66	16	0	9	33	4	14	.241	.398
Brandon Moss	84	265	48	77	18	0	21	52	1	26	.291	.596
Kurt Suzuki	75	262	19	57	15	0	1	18	1	9	.218	.286
Chris Carter	67	218	38	52	12	0	16	39	0	39	.239	.514
Derek Norris	60	209	19	42	8	1	7	34	5	21	.201	.349
Stephen Drew	39	152	21	38	5	0	5	16	1	18	.250	.382
Kila Ka'aihue	39	128	13	30	9	0	4	14	1	10	.234	.398
Daric Barton	46	113	8	23	7	0	1	6	1	22	.204	.292
Collin Cowgill	38	104	10	28	2	0	1	9	3	11	.269	.317
Eric Sogard	37	102	8	17	3	1	2	7	2	5	.167	.275
Adam Rosales	42	99	12	22	5	0	2	8	0	11	.222	.333
George Kottaras	27	85	10	18	2	1	6	19	0	8	.212	.471
Brandon Hicks	22	64	8	11	5	0	3	7	1	6	.172	.391
Anthony Recker	13	31	3	4	1	0	0	0	0	4	.129	.161
Michael Taylor	6	21	2	3	1	0	0	0	0	0	.143	.190
Luke Hughes	4	13	0	1	0	0	0	0	0	0	.077	.077
Brandon Allen	3	7	0	0	0	0	0	0	0	0	.000	.000
Pitcher totals	162	20	1	1	0	0	0	2	0	0	.050	.050
Team totals	162	5527	713	1315	267	32	195	676	122	550	.238	.404

=== Pitching ===
Note: W = Wins; L = Losses; ERA = Earned run average; G = Games pitched; GS = Games started; SV = Saves; IP = Innings pitched; H = Hits allowed; R = Runs allowed; ER = Earned runs allowed; BB = Walks allowed; SO = Strikeouts

Player	W	L	ERA	G	GS	SV	IP	H	R	ER	BB	SO
Tommy Milone	13	10	3.74	31	31	0	190.0	207	90	79	36	137
Jarrod Parker	13	8	3.47	29	29	0	181.1	166	71	70	63	140
Bartolo Colón	10	9	3.43	24	24	0	152.1	161	62	58	23	91
Brandon McCarthy	8	6	3.24	18	18	0	111.0	115	44	40	24	73
Travis Blackley	6	4	3.86	24	15	0	102.2	91	47	44	30	69
A.J. Griffin	7	1	3.06	15	15	0	82.1	74	29	28	19	64
Grant Balfour	3	2	2.53	75	0	24	74.2	41	21	21	28	72
Ryan Cook	6	2	2.09	71	0	14	73.1	42	18	17	27	80
Tyson Ross	2	11	6.50	18	13	0	73.1	96	56	53	37	46
Jerry Blevins	5	1	2.48	63	0	1	65.1	45	20	18	25	54
Jordan Norberto	4	1	2.77	39	0	1	52.0	37	17	16	22	46
Jim Miller	2	1	2.59	33	0	0	48.2	39	15	14	27	44
Sean Doolittle	2	1	3.04	44	0	1	47.1	40	18	16	11	60
Dan Straily	2	1	3.89	7	7	0	39.1	36	19	17	16	32
Evan Scribner	2	0	2.55	30	0	1	35.1	30	11	10	7	25
Brett Anderson	4	2	2.57	6	6	0	35.0	29	11	10	7	25
Brian Fuentes	2	2	6.84	26	0	5	25.0	30	19	19	10	18
Pedro Figueroa	0	0	3.32	19	0	0	21.2	16	9	8	15	14
Graham Godfrey	0	4	6.43	5	4	0	21.0	26	18	15	10	10
Pat Neshek	2	1	1.37	24	0	0	19.2	10	3	3	6	16
Andrew Carignan	1	1	4.66	11	0	0	9.2	8	5	5	10	8
Jesse Chavez	0	0	18.90	4	0	0	3.1	9	7	7	1	3
Fautino De Los Santos	0	0	3.00	6	0	0	3.0	7	2	1	3	3
Jeremy Accardo	0	0	9.00	1	0	0	2.0	4	2	2	0	1
Rich Thompson	0	0	0.00	1	0	0	0.2	1	0	0	0	0
Team totals	94	68	3.48	162	162	47	1470.0	1360	614	569	462	1136

== Game log ==
Legend
	Athletics win
	Athletics loss
	Postponement
**Bold**	Athletics team member

2012 Game Log
March/April (11–13)

#	Date	Opponent	Score	Win	Loss	Save	Attendance	Record
1	March 28	Mariners (@ Tokyo, Japan)	1–3 (11)	Wilhemsen (1–0)	**Carignan** (0–1)	League (1)	44,227	0–1
2	March 29	Mariners (@ Tokyo, Japan)	4–1	**Colón** (1–0)	Kelley (0–1)	**Balfour** (1)	43,391	1–1
3	April 6	Mariners	3–7	Vargas (1–0)	**McCarthy** (0–1)		35,067	1–2
4	April 7	Mariners	7–8	Hernández (1–0)	**Colón** (1–1)	League (2)	16,612	1–3
5	April 9	Royals	1–0	**Milone** (1–0)	Mendoza (0–1)	**Balfour** (2)	10,054	2–3
6	April 10	Royals	0–3 (8)	Duffy (1–0)	**Godfrey** (0–1)	Crow (1)	10,670	2–4
7	April 11	Royals	5–4 (12)	**Carignan** (1–1)	Broxton (0–1)		12,390	3–4
8	April 13	@ Mariners	4–0	**Colón** (2–1)	Hernández (1–1)		46,026	4–4
9	April 14	@ Mariners	0–4	Noesí (1–1)	**Milone** (1–1)		21,071	4–5
10	April 15	@ Mariners	3–5	Beavan (1–1)	**Godfrey** (0–2)	League (4)	19,650	4–6
11	April 16	@ Angels	0–6	Weaver (2–0)	**McCarthy** (0–2)		27,338	4–7
12	April 17	@ Angels	5–3	**Fuentes** (1–0)	Jepsen (0–1)	**Balfour** (3)	41,016	5–7
13	April 18	@ Angels	6–0	**Colón** (3–1)	Santana (0–3)		27,217	6–7
14	April 19	@ Angels	4–2	**Milone** (2–1)	Wilson (2–1)	**Balfour** (4)	27,864	7–7
15	April 20	Indians	3–4	Jiménez (2–0)	**Godfrey** (0–3)	Perez (5)	14,340	7–8
16	April 21	Indians	1–5	Gómez (1–0)	**McCarthy** (0–3)	Perez (6)	25,258	7–9
17	April 22	Indians	5–1	**Ross** (1–0)	Masterson (0–2)		24,049	8–9
18	April 23	White Sox	0–4	Peavy (3–0)	**Colón** (3–2)		10,574	8–10
19	April 24	White Sox	2–0	**Milone** (3–1)	Floyd (1–3)	**Balfour** (5)	11,184	9–10
20	April 25	White Sox	5–4 (14)	**Miller** (1–0)	Santiago (0–1)		13,032	10–10
21	April 27	@ Orioles	5–2	**McCarthy** (1–3)	Arrieta (1–2)	**Balfour** (6)	18,297	11–10
22	April 28	@ Orioles	1–10	Chen (2–0)	**Ross** (1–1)		26,926	11–11
23	April 29	@ Orioles	2–5	Strop (3–1)	**Balfour** (0–1)		31,793	11–12
24	April 30	@ Red Sox	6–11	Buchholz (3–1)	**Milone** (3–2)		37,359	11–13

May (11–16)

#	Date	Opponent	Score	Win	Loss	Save	Attendance	Record
25	May 1	@ Red Sox	5–3	**Parker** (1–0)	Doubront (1–1)	**Norberto** (1)	37,225	12–13
26	May 2	@ Red Sox	4–2	**McCarthy** (2–3)	Bard (2–3)	**Fuentes** (1)	37,434	13–13
27	May 4	@ Rays	2–7	Price (5–1)	**Ross** (1–2)	Peralta (2)	18,799	13–14
28	May 5	@ Rays	4–3 (12)	**Fuentes** (2–0)	Peralta (0–1)	**Balfour** (7)	23,890	14–14
29	May 6	@ Rays	9–5	**Milone** (4–2)	Moore (1–2)		23,873	15–14
30	May 8	Blue Jays	7–3	**Balfour** (1–1)	Cordero (1–2)		10,784	16–14
31	May 9	Blue Jays	2–5	Morrow (4–1)	**Ross** (2–2)	Janssen (1)	14,815	16–15
32	May 10	Tigers	6–10	Scherzer (2–3)	**Colón** (3–3)		11,513	16–16
33	May 11	Tigers	11–4	**Milone** (5–2)	Porcello (3–3)		26,721	17–16
34	May 12	Tigers	3–1	**McCarthy** (3–3)	Fister (0–1)	**Fuentes** (2)	20,077	18–16
35	May 13	Tigers	1–3	Verlander (4–1)	**Parker** (1–1)	Valverde (7)	17,147	18–17
36	May 14	@ Angels	5–0	**Ross** (2–3)	Haren (1–4)		32,851	19–17
37	May 15	@ Angels	0–4	Santana (2–6)	**Colón** (3–4)		31,762	19–18
38	May 16	@ Rangers	1–4	Darvish (6–1)	**Milone** (5–3)	Nathan (8)	46,370	19–19
39	May 17	@ Rangers	5–4 (10)	**Cook** (1–0)	Adams (0–2)	**Fuentes** (3)	47,182	20–19
40	May 18	@ Giants	6–8	Zito (3–1)	**Parker** (1–2)	Casilla (10)	41,477	20–20
41	May 19	@ Giants	0–4	Vogelsong (2–2)	**Ross** (2–4)		41,411	20–21
42	May 20	@ Giants	6–2	**Colón** (4–4)	Lincecum (2–4)		41,378	21–21
43	May 21	Angels	2–1	**Milone** (6–3)	Williams (4–2)	**Fuentes** (4)	11,292	22–21
44	May 22	Angels	0–5	Wilson (5–4)	**Godfrey** (0–4)		12,894	22–22
45	May 23	Angels	1–3 (11)	Walden (1–1)	**Norberto** (0–1)	Frieri (1)	23,617	22–23
46	May 25	Yankees	3–6	Nova (5–2)	**Ross** (2–5)	Soriano (4)	33,559	22–24
47	May 26	Yankees	2–9	Sabathia (6–2)	**Colón** (4–5)		27,112	22–25
48	May 27	Yankees	0–2	Kuroda (4–6)	**Milone** (6–4)	Soriano (5)	25,078	22–26
49	May 28	@ Twins	4–5	Burnett (2–0)	**Cook** (1–1)	Capps (10)	34,709	22–27
50	May 29	@ Twins	2–3	Perkins (2–1)	**Fuentes** (2–1)		31,781	22–28
51	May 30	@ Twins	0–4	Liriano (1–5)	**Ross** (2–6)		35,103	22–29

June (15–13)

#	Date	Opponent	Score	Win	Loss	Save	Attendance	Record
52	June 1	@ Royals	0–2	Paulino (3–1)	**Colón** (4–6)	Broxton (12)	29,527	22–30
53	June 2	@ Royals	9–3	**McCarthy** (4–3)	Hochevar (3–6)		26,276	23–30
54	June 3	@ Royals	0–2	Mazzaro (2–0)	**Milone** (6–5)	Broxton (13)	21,111	23–31
55	June 4	Rangers	12–1	**Parker** (2–2)	Feldman (0–4)		10,120	24–31
56	June 5	Rangers	3–6	Holland (5–4)	**Blackley** (0–1)	Nathan (12)	11,861	24–32
57	June 6	Rangers	2–0	**Colón** (5–6)	Lewis (4–5)	**Fuentes** (5)	15,044	25–32
58	June 7	Rangers	7–1	**McCarthy** (5–3)	Darvish (7–4)		14,779	26–32
59	June 8	@ Diamondbacks	8–9	Putz (1–3)	**Fuentes** (2–2)		25,787	26–33
60	June 9	@ Diamondbacks	3–8	Cahill (4–5)	**Parker** (2–3)		28,061	26–34
61	June 10	@ Diamondbacks	3–4	Saunders (4–4)	**Blackley** (0–2)	Putz (13)	28,112	26–35
62	June 12	@ Rockies	8–5	**Colón** (6–6)	Guthrie (3–5)	**Cook** (1)	33,635	27–35
63	June 13	@ Rockies	10–8	**Blevins** (1–0)	Betancourt (1–2)	**Cook** (2)	32,155	28–35
64	June 14	@ Rockies	8–2	**Parker** (3–3)	White (2–5)		32,527	29–35
65	June 15	Padres	10–2	**Blackley** (1–2)	Bass (2–7)	**Scribner** (1)	24,528	30–35
66	June 16	Padres	6–4	**Doolittle** (1–0)	Thatcher (0–2)	**Cook** (3)	17,135	31–35
67	June 17	Padres	1–2	Richard (4–7)	**Colón** (6–7)	Street (8)	21,631	31–36
68	June 19	Dodgers	3–0	**McCarthy** (6–3)	Harang (5–4)	**Cook** (4)	20,244	32–36
69	June 20	Dodgers	4–1	**Milone** (7–5)	Eovaldi (0–3)		25,383	33–36
70	June 21	Dodgers	4–1	**Cook** (2–1)	Lindblom (2–1)		23,337	34–36
71	June 22	Giants	4–5	Hensley (3–3)	**Cook** (2–2)	Casilla (20)	35,067	34–37
72	June 23	Giants	8–9	Bumgarner (9–4)	**Ross** (2–7)	Hensley (2)	36,067	34–38
73	June 24	Giants	4–2	**Miller** (2–0)	Casilla (1–3)		36,067	35–38
74	June 25	@ Mariners	1–0	**Milone** (8–5)	Ramírez (0–2)	**Cook** (5)	17,101	36–38
75	June 26	@ Mariners	2–3	Furbush (4–1)	**Miller** (2–1)	Wilhelmsen (6)	12,411	36–39
76	June 27	@ Mariners	2–1	**Parker** (4–3)	Iwakuma (1–1)	**Cook** (6)	18,158	37–39
77	June 28	@ Rangers	6–7	Feldman (2–6)	**Ross** (2–8)	Nathan (18)	33,927	37–40
78	June 29	@ Rangers	3–4	Harrison (11–3)	**Balfour** (1–2)	Scheppers (1)	46,013	37–41
79	June 30	@ Rangers	2–7	Pérez (1–0)	**Milone** (8–6)		46,711	37–42

July (19–5)

#	Date	Opponent	Score	Win	Loss	Save	Attendance	Record
80	July 1	@ Rangers	3–1	**Blackley** (2–2)	Darvish (10–5)	**Cook** (7)	45,741	38–42
81	July 2	Red Sox	6–1	**Parker** (5–3)	Matsuzaka (0–3)		17,434	39–42
82	July 3	Red Sox	3–2	**Blevins** (2–0)	Aceves (0–6)		35,067	40–42
83	July 4	Red Sox	3–2	**Balfour** (2–2)	Cook (2–2)	**Cook** (8)	28,240	41–42
84	July 6	Mariners	4–1 (11)	**Norberto** (1–1)	Pérez (0–1)		10,819	42–42
85	July 7	Mariners	1–7	Vargas (8–7)	**Parker** (5–4)		16,136	42–43
86	July 8	Mariners	2–1 (13)	**Norberto** (2–1)	Pérez (0–2)		20,075	43–43
87	July 13	@ Twins	6–3	**Griffin** (1–0)	Liriano (3–8)	**Cook** (9)	33,230	44–43
88	July 14	@ Twins	9–3	**Milone** (9–6)	De Vries (2–2)		39,084	45–43
89	July 15	@ Twins	9–4	**Parker** (6–4)	Duensing (1–6)		36,583	46–43
90	July 17	Rangers	1–6	Oswalt (3–1)	**Colón** (6–8)		15,115	46–44
91	July 18	Rangers	4–3	**Cook** (3–2)	Kirkman (0–1)		20,249	47–44
92	July 19	Yankees	4–3	**Griffin** (2–0)	García (4–3)	**Cook** (10)	23,382	48–44
93	July 20	Yankees	3–2	**Cook** (4–2)	Eppley (0–1)		24,148	49–44
94	July 21	Yankees	2–1	**Parker** (7–4)	Hughes (9–8)	**Doolittle** (1)	28,142	50–44
95	July 22	Yankees	5–4 (12)	**Blevins** (3–0)	Eppley (0–2)		30,470	51–44
96	July 24	@ Blue Jays	7–2	**Blackley** (3–2)	Cecil (2–3)		25,686	52–44
97	July 25	@ Blue Jays	16–0	**Griffin** (3–0)	Romero (8–7)		23,948	53–44
98	July 26	@ Blue Jays	4–10	Lyon (1–2)	**Milone** (9–7)		39,003	53–45
99	July 27	@ Orioles	14–9	**Blevins** (4–0)	Johnson (1–1)		29,278	54–45
100	July 28	@ Orioles	6–1	**Colón** (7–8)	Hunter (4–6)		21,143	55–45
101	July 29	@ Orioles	1–6	Chen (9–6)	**Blackley** (3–3)		19,698	55–46
102	July 30	Rays	4–3 (15)	**Norberto** (3–1)	Farnsworth (0–3)		12,564	56–46
103	July 31	Rays	0–8	Shields (9–7)	**Milone** (9–8)		15,836	56–47

August (18–10)

#	Date	Opponent	Score	Win	Loss	Save	Attendance	Record
104	August 1	Rays	1–4	Cobb (5–8)	**Parker** (7–5)	Rodney (31)	18,161	56–48
105	August 2	Blue Jays	4–1	**Colón** (8–8)	Álvarez (7–8)	**Cook** (11)	10,823	57–48
106	August 3	Blue Jays	5–4 (15)	**Blackley** (4–3)	Loup (0–2)		30,169	58–48
107	August 4	Blue Jays	1–3 (11)	Chavez (1–1)	**Blevins** (4–1)	Oliver (2)	17,121	58–49
108	August 5	Blue Jays	5–6	Laffey (3–2)	**Milone** (9–9)	Janssen (14)	18,308	58–50
109	August 6	Angels	0–4	Weaver (15–1)	**Parker** (7–6)		13,341	58–51
110	August 7	Angels	10–4	**Colón** (9–8)	Wilson (9–8)		15,458	59–51
111	August 8	Angels	9–8	**Neshek** (1–0)	Hawkins (2–3)	**Cook** (12)	21,150	60–51
112	August 10	@ White Sox	3–4	Myers (1–5)	**Neshek** (1–1)		25,041	60–52
113	August 11	@ White Sox	9–7	**Cook** (5–2)	Thornton (4–8)	**Balfour** (8)	26,686	61–52
114	August 12	@ White Sox	3–7	Sale (14–3)	**Colón** (9–9)		25,106	61–53
115	August 14	@ Royals	0–5	Guthrie (5–12)	**Parker** (7–7)		16,107	61–54
116	August 15	@ Royals	2–3	Smith (4–4)	**McCarthy** (6–4)	Holland (4)	15,591	61–55
117	August 16	@ Royals	3–0	**Straily** (1–0)	Hochevar (7–11)	**Balfour** (9)	14,345	62–55
118	August 17	Indians	6–4	**Norberto** (4–1)	Smith (7–3)	**Balfour** (10)	13,967	63–55
119	August 18	Indians	8–5	**Colón** (10–9)	Kluber (0–2)	**Balfour** (11)	30,132	64–55
120	August 19	Indians	7–0	**Parker** (8–7)	Masterson (9–11)		20,130	65–55
121	August 20	Twins	2–7	Duensing (3–8)	**McCarthy** (6–5)		10,274	65–56
122	August 21	Twins	4–1	**Anderson** (1–0)	De Vries (2–5)	**Balfour** (12)	13,116	66–56
123	August 22	Twins	5–1	**Milone** (10–9)	Hendriks (0–6)		16,657	67–56
124	August 23	@ Rays	0–5	Cobb (8–8)	**Ross** (2–9)		11,613	67–57
125	August 24	@ Rays	5–4	**Cook** (6–2)	Peralta (1–6)	**Balfour** (13)	18,913	68–57
126	August 25	@ Rays	4–2	**McCarthy** (7–5)	Hellickson (8–9)	**Balfour** (14)	18,187	69–57
127	August 27	@ Indians	3–0	**Anderson** (2–0)	Hernández (0–3)	**Balfour** (15)	13,018	70–57
128	August 28	@ Indians	7–0	**Milone** (11–9)	McAllister (5–5)		13,413	71–57
129	August 29	@ Indians	8–4	**Blackley** (5–3)	Kluber (0–3)	**Cook** (13)	14,412	72–57
130	August 30	@ Indians	12–7	**Parker** (9–7)	Masterson (10–12)		14,500	73–57
131	August 31	Red Sox	20–2	**McCarthy** (8–5)	Cook (3–8)		20,121	74–57

September/October (20–11)

#	Date	Opponent	Score	Win	Loss	Save	Attendance	Record
132	September 1	Red Sox	7–1	**Griffin** (4–0)	Doubront (10–7)		20,315	75–57
133	September 2	Red Sox	6–2	**Anderson** (3–0)	Matsuzaka (1–4)		25,314	76–57
134	September 3	Angels	3–8	Wilson (11–9)	**Milone** (11–10)		20,180	76–58
135	September 4	Angels	1–6	Greinke (13–5)	**Parker** (9–8)		11,688	76–59
136	September 5	Angels	1–7	Haren (10–10)	**McCarthy** (8–6)		15,404	76–60
137	September 7	@ Mariners	6–1	**Griffin** (5–0)	Hernández (13–7)		17,128	77–60
138	September 8	@ Mariners	6–1	**Anderson** (4–0)	Iwakuma (6–4)		23,177	78–60
139	September 9	@ Mariners	4–2	**Milone** (12–10)	Vargas (14–10)	**Balfour** (16)	14,403	79–60
140	September 10	@ Angels	3–1	**Parker** (10–8)	Haren (10–11)	**Balfour** (17)	36,064	80–60
141	September 11	@ Angels	6–5	**Straily** (2–0)	Williams (6–8)	**Blevins** (1)	37,794	81–60
142	September 12	@ Angels	4–1	**Griffin** (6–0)	Santana (8–12)	**Cook** (14)	38,097	82–60
143	September 13	@ Angels	0–6	Weaver (17–4)	**Anderson** (4–1)		38,029	82–61
144	September 14	Orioles	3–2	**Milone** (13–10)	Saunders (8–12)	**Balfour** (18)	35,067	83–61
145	September 15	Orioles	5–2	**Parker** (11–8)	Britton (5–3)	**Balfour** (19)	20,342	84–61
146	September 16	Orioles	5–9	Matusz (6–10)	**Straily** (2–1)	Johnson (43)	20,539	84–62
147	September 18	@ Tigers	2–12	Downs (2–1)	**Griffin** (6–1)		31,243	84–63
148	September 19	@ Tigers	2–6	Verlander (15–8)	**Anderson** (4–2)		29,734	84–64
149	September 20	@ Tigers	12–4	**Neshek** (2–1)	Sánchez (8–13)		34,635	85–64
150	September 21	@ Yankees	1–2 (10)	Robertson (2–7)	**Doolittle** (1–1)		40,759	85–65
151	September 22	@ Yankees	9–10 (14)	Wade (1–1)	**Ross** (2–10)		44,026	85–66
152	September 23	@ Yankees	5–4	**Blevins** (5–1)	Kuroda (14–11)	**Balfour** (20)	43,867	86–66
153	September 24	@ Rangers	4–5	Nathan (3–4)	**Ross** (2–11)		43,044	86–67
154	September 25	@ Rangers	3–2 (10)	**Scribner** (1–0)	Lowe (0–2)	**Balfour** (21)	43,874	87–67
155	September 26	@ Rangers	9–3	**Parker** (12–8)	Pérez (1–3)		46,689	88–67
156	September 27	@ Rangers	7–9	Harrison (18–10)	**Blackley** (5–4)	Nathan (36)	43,796	88–68
157	September 28	Mariners	8–2	**Griffin** (7–1)	Beavan (10–11)		16,376	89–68
158	September 29	Mariners	7–4 (10)	**Balfour** (3–2)	Pérez (1–3)		21,517	90–68
159	September 30	Mariners	5–2	**Doolittle** (2–1)	Kelley (2–4)	**Balfour** (22)	21,057	91–68
160	October 1	Rangers	4–3	**Parker** (13–8)	Pérez (1–4)	**Balfour** (23)	21,162	92–68
161	October 2	Rangers	3–1	**Blackley** (6–4)	Harrison (18–11)	**Balfour** (24)	30,660	93–68
162	October 3	Rangers	12–5	**Scribner** (2–0)	Holland (12–7)		36,067	94–68

== Postseason ==
=== Division Series ===
The Athletics played the Detroit Tigers in the Division Series.

==== Game 1, October 6 ====
6:07 p.m. (EDT) at Comerica Park in Detroit, Michigan

Team	1	2	3	4	5	6	7	8	9	R	H	E
Oakland	1	0	0	0	0	0	0	0	0	1	4	1
Detroit	1	0	1	0	1	0	0	0	X	3	7	0
Starting pitchers: OAK: Jarrod Parker (0–0); DET: Justin Verlander (0–0) --> WP: Justin Verlander (1–0) LP: Jarrod Parker (0–1) Sv: José Valverde (1); Home runs: OAK: Coco Crisp (1); DET: Alex Avila (1)

==== Game 2, October 7 ====
12:07 p.m. (EDT) at Comerica Park in Detroit, Michigan

Team	1	2	3	4	5	6	7	8	9	R	H	E
Oakland	0	0	1	0	0	0	1	2	0	4	9	1
Detroit	0	0	1	0	0	0	2	1	1	5	11	0
Starting pitchers: OAK: Tommy Milone (0–0); DET: Doug Fister (0–0) --> WP: Al Alburquerque (1–0) LP: Grant Balfour (0–1); Home runs: OAK: Josh Reddick (1); DET: None

==== Game 3, October 9 ====
9:07 p.m. (EDT) at O.co Coliseum in Oakland, California

Team	1	2	3	4	5	6	7	8	9	R	H	E
Detroit	0	0	0	0	0	0	0	0	0	0	4	0
Oakland	1	0	0	0	1	0	0	0	0	2	5	0
Starting pitchers: DET: Aníbal Sánchez (0–0); OAK: Brett Anderson (0–0) --> WP: Brett Anderson (1–0) LP: Aníbal Sánchez (0–1) Sv: Grant Balfour (1); Home runs: DET: None; OAK: Seth Smith (1)

==== Game 4, October 10 ====
9:37 p.m. (EDT) at O.co Coliseum in Oakland, California

Team	1	2	3	4	5	6	7	8	9	R	H	E
Detroit	0	0	0	1	1	0	0	1	0	3	10	1
Oakland	0	0	0	0	0	1	0	0	3	4	8	0
Starting pitchers: DET: Max Scherzer (0–0); OAK: A. J. Griffin (0–0) --> WP: Ryan Cook (1–0) LP: José Valverde (0–1); Home runs: DET: Prince Fielder (1); OAK: None

==== Game 5, October 11 ====
9:37 p.m. (EDT) at O.co Coliseum in Oakland, California

Team	1	2	3	4	5	6	7	8	9	R	H	E
Detroit	0	0	2	0	0	0	4	0	0	6	9	0
Oakland	0	0	0	0	0	0	0	0	0	0	4	1
Starting pitchers: DET: Justin Verlander (1–0); OAK: Jarrod Parker (0–1) --> WP: Justin Verlander (2–0) LP: Jarrod Parker (0–2)

== Farm System ==
=== Farm system affiliates ===
Level	Team	League	Manager
AAA	Sacramento River Cats	Pacific Coast League	Darren Bush
AA	Midland RockHounds	Texas League	Steve Scarsone
A	Stockton Ports	California League	Webster Garrison
A	Burlington Bees	Midwest League	Aaron Nieckula
A-Short Season	Vermont Lake Monsters	New York–Penn League	Rick Magnante
Rookie	AZL Athletics	Arizona League	Marcus Jensen

In September, the organization announced a two-year player development contract with the Class A Beloit Snappers, replacing Burlington after two seasons.

=== Arizona Fall League ===
Gary Daley, Grant Green, Shawn Haviland, Miles Head, Brett Hunter, Max Stassi, James Simmons will represent the organization on the Phoenix Desert Dogs

=== MLB top prospects ===
as of August 26, 2012

Player	Position	Rank	Acquisition	2012 Levels
1	Michael Choice	OF	Drafted 1st Rd (2010)	AA
2	Brad Peacock	SP	Gonzalez Trade	AAA
3	Sonny Gray	SP	Drafted 1st Rd (2011)	AA
4	A. J. Cole	SP	Gonzalez Trade	A+, A
5	Grant Green	OF/IF	Drafted 1st Rd (2009)	AAA
6	Yordy Cabrera	SS	Drafted 2nd Rd (2010)	A+
7	Ian Krol	P	Drafted 7th Rd (2009)	A+
8	Dan Straily	P	Drafted 24th Rd (2009)	AA, AAA
9	Raúl Alcántara	SP	Bailey/Sweeney Trade	A
10	Vical de la Cruz	OF	Int'l FA (2010)	R
11	A. J. Griffin	SP	Drafted 13th Rd (2010)	AA, AAA
12	Blake Hassebrock	SP	Drafted 8th Rd (2010)	A+
13	Aaron Shipman	OF	Drafted 3rd Rd (2010)	A
14	David Freitas	C	Suzuki Trade	
15	Jermaine Mitchell	OF	Drafted 5th Rd (2006)	AAA
16	Renato Núñez	3B		R
17	Stephen Parker	3B	Drafted 5th Rd (2009)	AAA
18	Max Stassi	C	Drafted 4th Rd (2009)	A+
19	Miles Head	IF	Bailey/Sweeney Trade	A+, AA
20	Michael Taylor	OF	Wallace Trade	AAA

Bold has played in Oakland during 2012 season. Carter, Cowgill, Norris and Parker have been removed.

Baseball America named Céspedes (14), Parker (26), Peacock (36), Cole (57), Gray (65), and Choice (80) to their Top 100 Prospects list. Baseball Prospectus named Choice (39), Parker (50), Cole (60), Peacock (64), Gray (72), Norris (96), and Green (100) to their Top 101 Prospects list.
