= Kila Kaʻaihue =

American baseball player (born 1984)

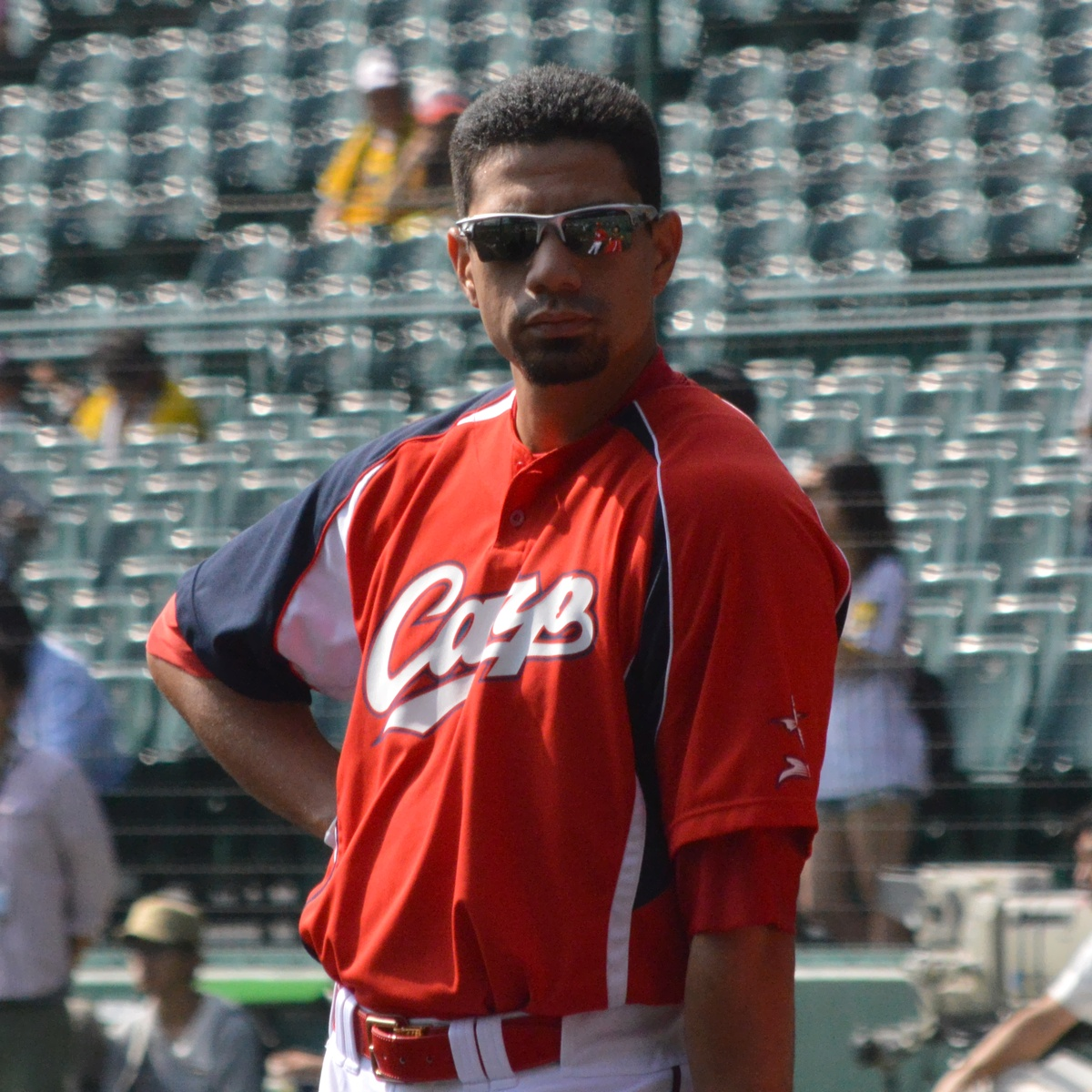
- Ka'aihue with the Hiroshima Toyo Carp in 2013
- First baseman / Designated hitter
- Born: March 29, 1984 (age 42); Kailua, Hawaii, U.S.
- Batted: Left Threw: Right

Professional debut
- MLB: September 4, 2008, for the Kansas City Royals
- NPB: 2013, for the Hiroshima Toyo Carp

Last appearance
- MLB: June 5, 2012, for the Oakland Athletics
- NPB: 2014, for the Hiroshima Toyo Carp

MLB statistics
- Batting average: .221
- Home runs: 15
- Runs batted in: 46

NPB statistics
- Batting average: .258
- Home runs: 25
- Runs batted in: 85
- Stats at Baseball Reference

Teams
- Kansas City Royals (2008, 2010–2011); Oakland Athletics (2012); Hiroshima Toyo Carp (2013–2014)

Micah Kilakila Kaʻaihue (/ˈkiːlə kəʔaɪˈhuːeɪ/; born March 29, 1984) is an American former professional baseball player. He played in Major League Baseball (MLB) for the Kansas City Royals and Oakland Athletics and in Nippon Professional Baseball (NPB) for the Hiroshima Toyo Carp. Kaʻaihue went to Iolani School in Honolulu, Hawaii.

== Professional career ==
=== Kansas City Royals ===
The Kansas City Royals chose Kaʻaihue in the 15th round, with the 438th overall selection, of the 2002 Major League Baseball draft. He played for the Gulf Coast Royals in 2002, Single-A Burlington Bees in 2003 and 2004, and the Single-A Advanced High Desert Mavericks in 2005. In 2006, he played for the Double-A Wichita Wranglers.

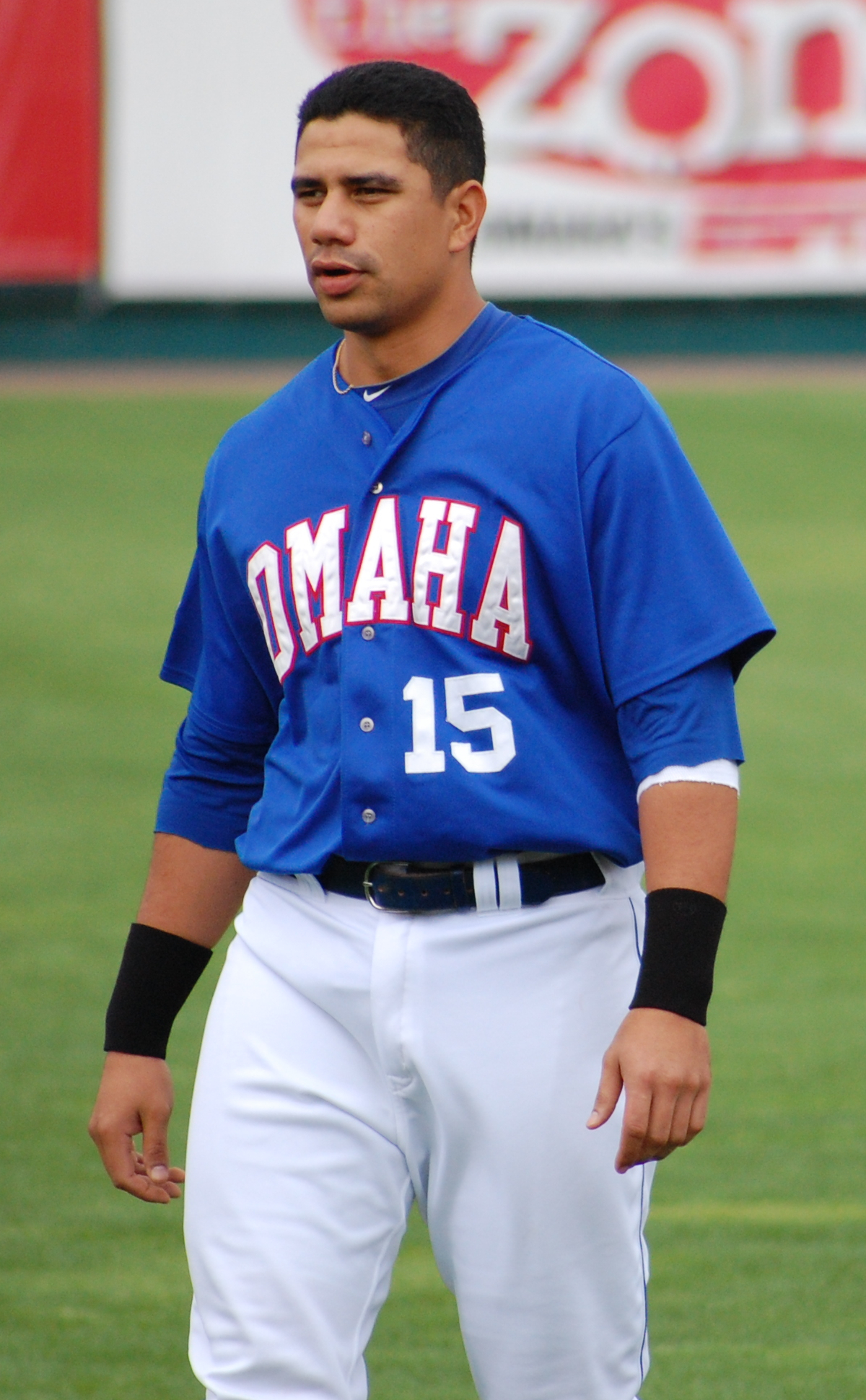
Kaʻaihue with the Omaha Storm Chasers in 2010

Kaʻaihue split 2007 between the Single-A Advanced Wilmington Blue Rocks and Wichita. In 2008, Kaʻaihue played for Kansas City's new Double-A affiliate, the Northwest Arkansas Naturals. There, he led the minor leagues in walks, with 104. He also played for the Triple-A Omaha Royals.

When rosters expanded on September 1, 2008, Kaʻaihue was called up to the major leagues. He made his major league debut on September 4, 2008. He hit his first major league home run on September 20, 2008.

Kaʻaihue spent the entire 2009 season in Omaha. He began the 2010 season in Omaha, and was called up to Kansas City in May. In his first Major League at bat that season, he pinch hit for Willie Bloomquist in the 8th inning of a May 6 game against the Texas Rangers, and hit a run batted in (RBI) single that broke an 11–11 tie. After having a disappointing start of the season Kila started getting hot finishing the 2010 Royals season with eight home runs and 25 RBIs.

Kaʻaihue started the 2011 season as the regular first baseman for the Kansas City Royals. He hit a walk-off home run on April 1 as the Royals beat the Angels 2–1. Mired in a hitting slump from the start of the season, averaging just .195 in 23 games, with only six RBIs and two home runs, Kaʻaihue was optioned to Triple-A Omaha on May 5. Eric Hosmer was called up to replace him. He was designated for assignment on September 21, 2011.

=== Oakland Athletics ===
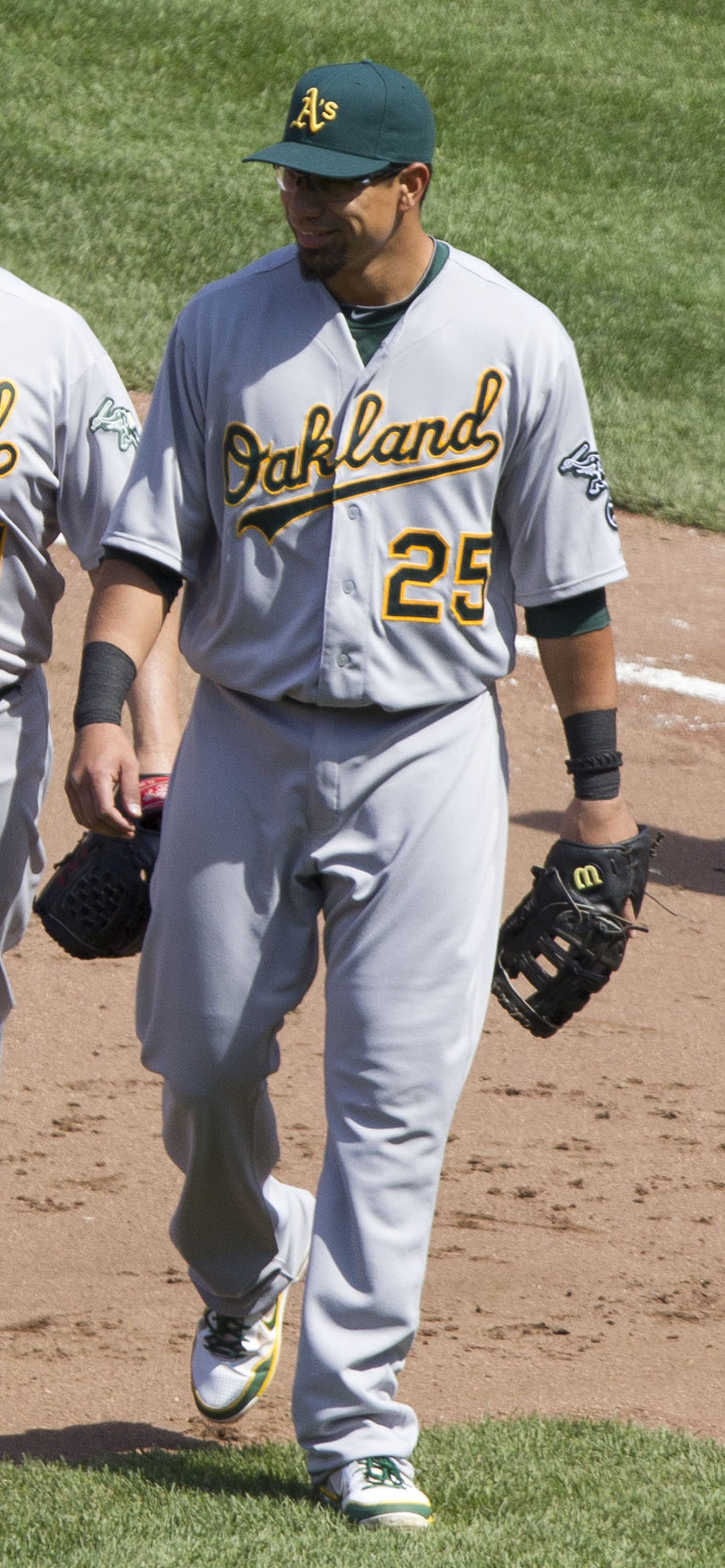
Kaʻaihue with the Oakland Athletics in 2012

On September 27, 2011, the Royals traded Kaʻaihue to the Oakland Athletics for minor league pitcher Ethan Hollingsworth. On June 6, 2012, the Athletics designated him for assignment. In 39 games for the Athletics, he hit .234/.295/.398 with four home runs and 14 RBIs.

=== Arizona Diamondbacks ===
On November 21, 2012, Kaʻaihue signed a minor league contract with the Arizona Diamondbacks, but was released from the Reno Aces, Arizona's Triple-A affiliate, on June 1, 2013. He led the Triple-A Pacific Coast League in home runs.

=== Hiroshima Toyo Carp ===
On June 15, 2013, Kaʻaihue signed with the Hiroshima Toyo Carp in Japan.

=== Washington Nationals ===
On January 18, 2015, he signed a minor league contract with the Washington Nationals. He was released on May 24 after hitting just .194 in the minors.

=== Miami Marlins ===
On June 22, 2015, he signed a minor league deal with the Miami Marlins.

== Coaching career ==
In July 2016 Ka'aihue accepted the head coaching job at Henry J. Kaiser High School. Upon the completion of his degree in accounting in 2020, Kaʻaihue joined the coaching staff for the Hawaii Rainbow Warriors as a volunteer assistant.

== Personal ==
Kaʻaihue's younger brother, Kala Ka'aihue, is a minor league baseball first baseman. He is of Hawaiian descent.
