= A. J. Griffin (baseball) =

American baseball player (born 1988)

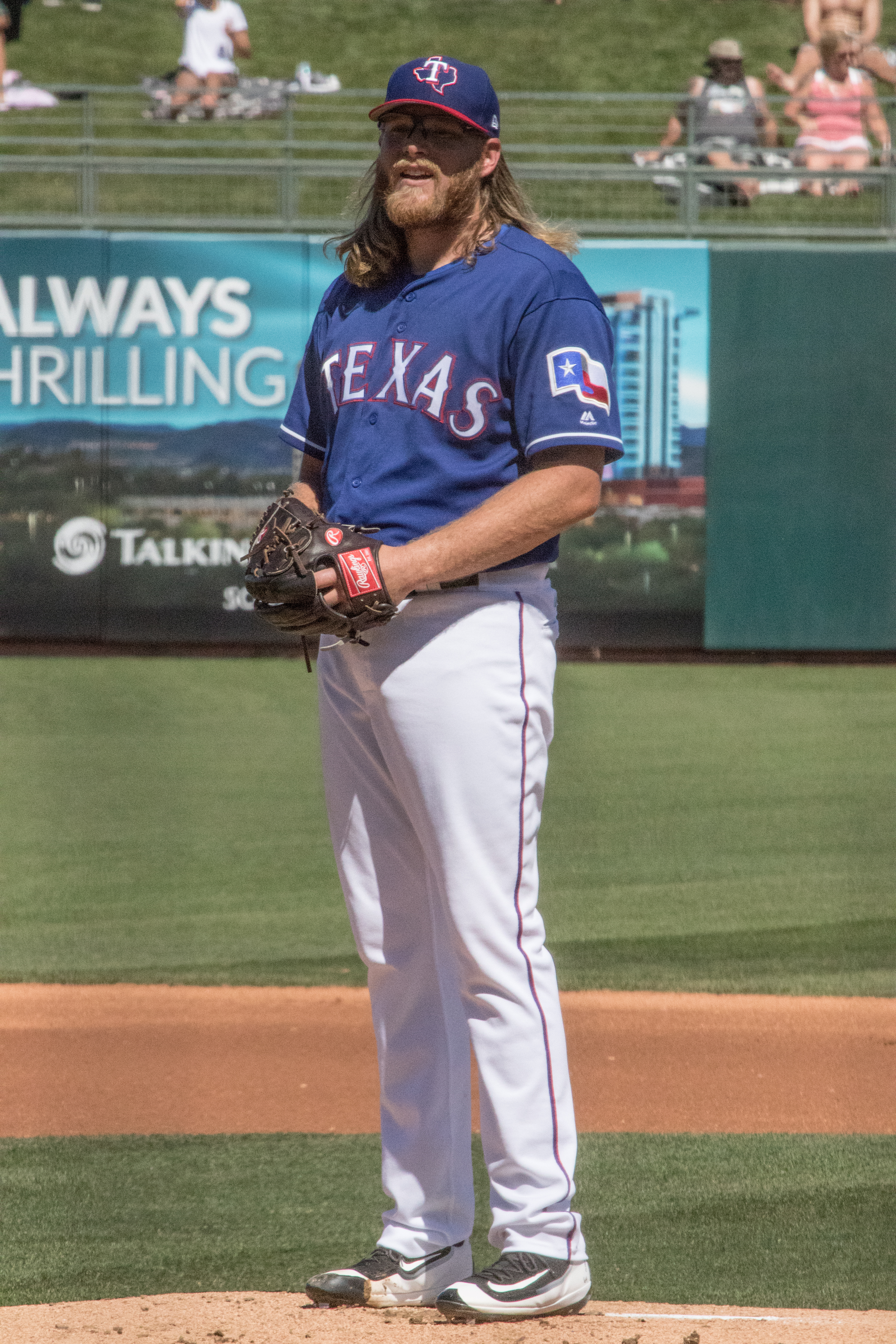
- Griffin with the Texas Rangers in 2017 spring training
- Pitcher
- Born: January 28, 1988 (age 38); El Cajon, California, U.S.
- Batted: Right Threw: Right

MLB debut
- June 24, 2012, for the Oakland Athletics

Last MLB appearance
- September 26, 2017, for the Texas Rangers

MLB statistics
- Win–loss record: 34–21
- Earned run average: 4.34
- Strikeouts: 403
- Stats at Baseball Reference

Teams
- Oakland Athletics (2012–2013); Texas Rangers (2016–2017)

Arthur Joseph Griffin (born January 28, 1988) is an American former professional baseball pitcher. He has previously played in Major League Baseball (MLB) for the Oakland Athletics and Texas Rangers.

== Early life ==
Griffin attended Grossmont High School. He was named the pitcher and player of the year in his league during the 2006 season. Grossmont won the league championship. He was drafted by the Philadelphia Phillies in the 34th round in 2009, but he did not sign with the Phillies. He attended the University of San Diego, where he played college baseball for the Toreros from 2007 to 2010.

== Professional career ==
=== Draft ===
The Oakland Athletics selected Griffin in the 13th round of the 2010 Major League Baseball draft.

=== Oakland Athletics (2012–2015) ===
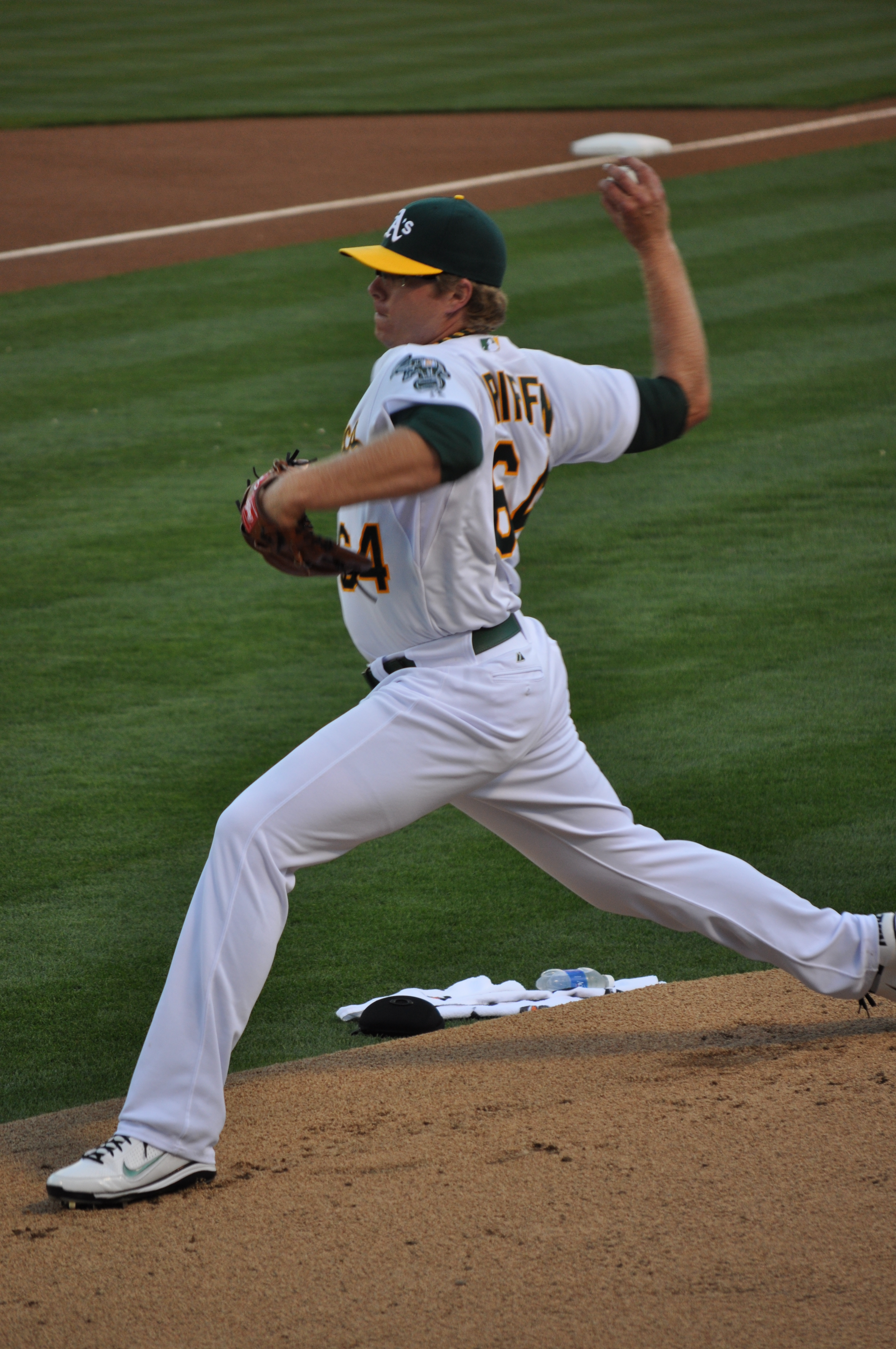
Griffin pitching for the Oakland Athletics in 2012

Griffin made his major league debut on June 24, 2012, against the San Francisco Giants. He went 6 innings giving up 2 runs on 3 hits, striking out 4 and walking 1 in a no-decision. Griffin struck out Gregor Blanco looking for his first major league strikeout. Griffin finished the season with a record of 7-1 and an ERA of 3.06 in 15 starts for the A's. Griffin pitched in the 2012 ALDS against the Detroit Tigers, pitching 5 innings of 2 run ball en route to a no-decision.

Griffin made the A's opening day roster and started out as the fourth starter in the rotation. He won his first start of the 2013 season beating out the Seattle Mariners to tie the opening series of the season. Griffin pitched his first career shutout/complete game on June 26, defeating the Cincinnati Reds. Griffin pitched 200 innings for the division winning A's, providing them with 32 starts and 14 wins in the process. He also led the league in home runs allowed with 36.

Griffin began the 2014 season on the 60 Day DL with flexor tendinitis in his right elbow. On April 29, it was announced that Griffin would require Tommy John surgery and would miss the entire 2014 season.

Griffin was placed on the 60-day disabled list to begin the 2015 season in an effort to continue recovery from last year's Tommy John surgery. He spent the entire year recovering once again after feeling soreness in his surgically repaired elbow. Towards the end of August, Griffin made his first appearance in almost 2 years, pitching in Class A. After making 2 starts, he got called up to AAA to finish the season. After 4 starts of recovery, Griffin didn't get called up by the A's. On November 20, Griffin was designated for assignment. He was released a few days later.

=== Texas Rangers ===
Griffin signed a minor league contract with the Texas Rangers on December 21, 2015. With Yu Darvish being out until May, the Rangers had one open spot in the rotation. Griffin won the job during Spring Training, and was slated as the 5th man in the rotation. Griffin had finally made his MLB return on April 8, 2016, against the Los Angeles Angels. He pitched six innings, allowing three runs on six hits with one strikeout as the Rangers won, 7–3, giving Griffin his first victory in more than two years.

Griffin made 18 appearances (15 starts) for the Rangers during the 2017 season, compiling a 6-6 record and 5.94 ERA with 61 strikeouts across 77 1/3 innings pitched. On December 1, 2017, Griffin was non-tendered by the Rangers, making him a free agent.

=== New York Mets ===
On February 26, 2018, Griffin signed a minor league contract with an invite to spring training with the New York Mets. He was released on April 19.

=== Olmecas de Tabasco ===
On April 11, 2024, after 6 years of inactivity, Griffin signed with the Olmecas de Tabasco of the Mexican League. In six appearances, he posted a 1–1 record with a 9.24 ERA and seven strikeouts over 12.2 innings. Griffin was released on May 26.

=== Tigres de Quintana Roo ===
On June 7, 2024, Griffin signed with the Tigres de Quintana Roo of the Mexican League. In two starts for Quintana Roo, he recorded a 2.84 ERA with 7 strikeouts across 6 1/3 innings pitched. On June 16, Griffin was released by the Tigres.

== Pitching style ==
Griffin throws four pitches: a four-seam fastball at 88–91 mph, a 12-6 curveball at 68–70, a cutter to right-handed hitters at 82–85, and a changeup to left-handers at 78–82.
