= Brandon Hicks =

American baseball player (born 1985)

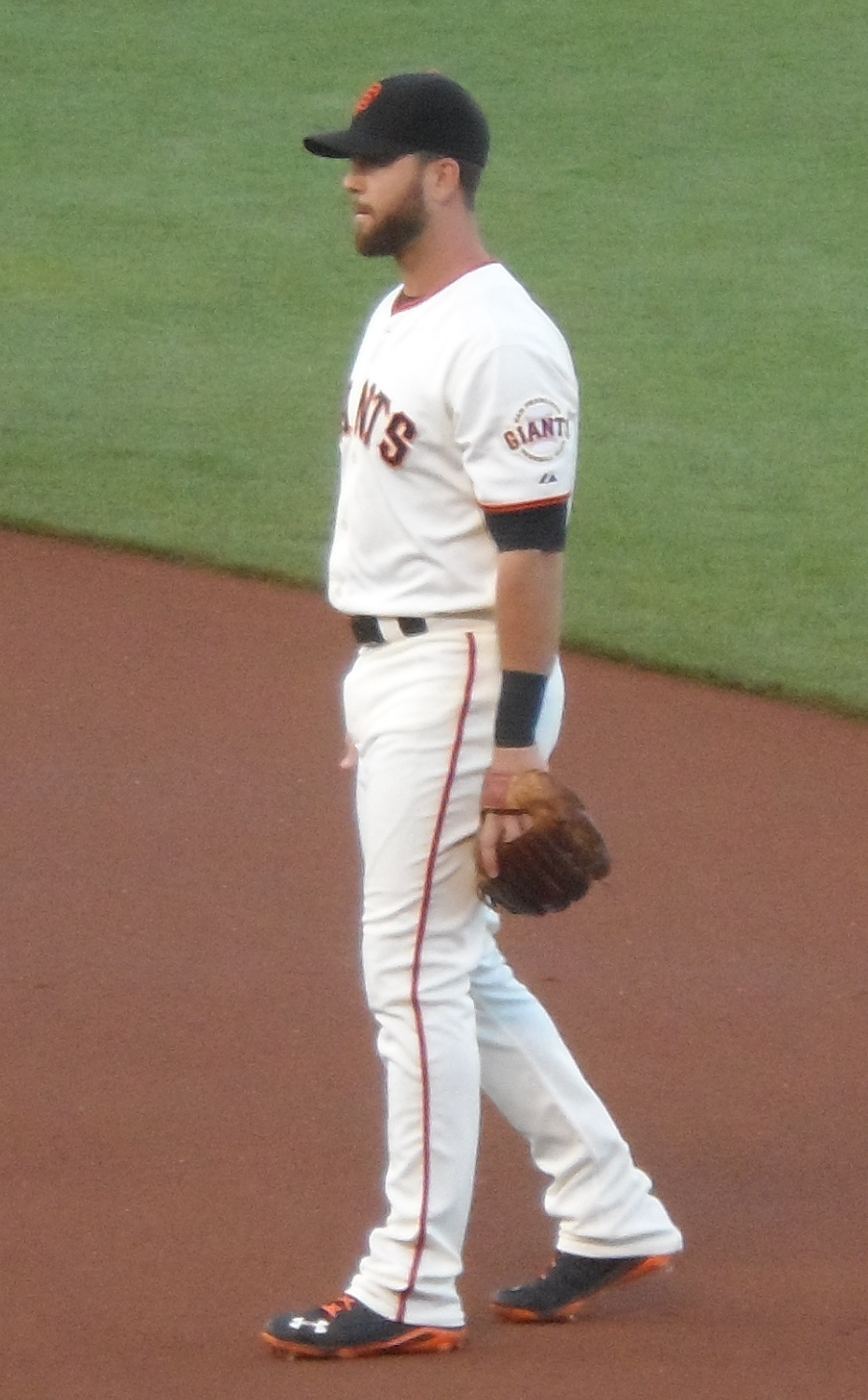
- Hicks with the San Francisco Giants in 2014
- Second baseman / Shortstop
- Born: September 14, 1985 (age 41); Houston, Texas, U.S.
- Batted: Right Threw: Right

MLB debut
- May 5, 2010, for the Atlanta Braves

Last MLB appearance
- July 10, 2014, for the San Francisco Giants

MLB statistics
- Batting average: .153
- Home runs: 11
- Runs batted in: 30
- Stats at Baseball Reference

Teams
- Atlanta Braves (2010–2011); Oakland Athletics (2012); San Francisco Giants (2014)

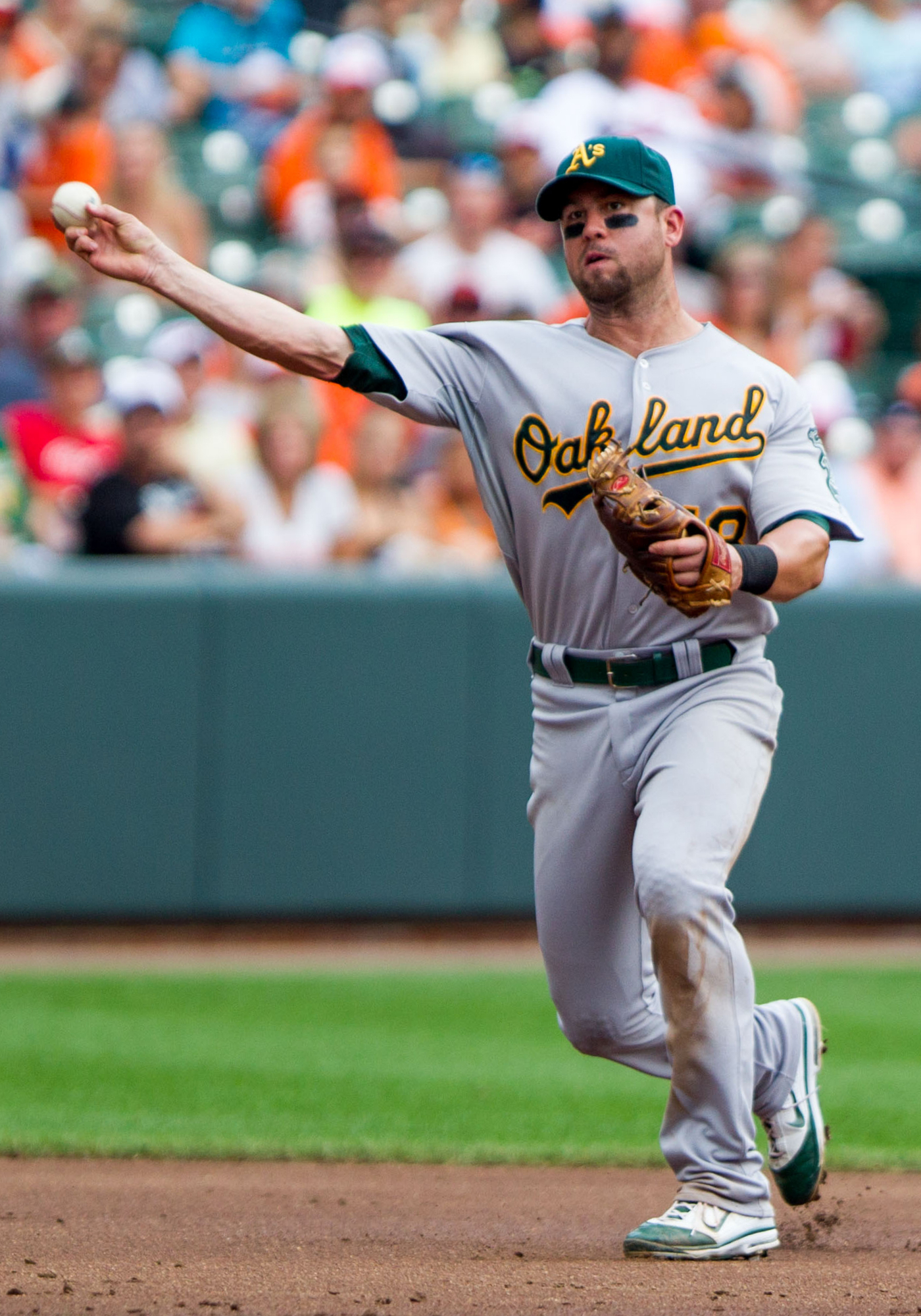
Hicks playing for the Oakland Athletics in 2012

Brandon Ryan Hicks (born September 14, 1985) is an American former professional baseball infielder. He played in Major League Baseball (MLB) for the Atlanta Braves, Oakland Athletics and San Francisco Giants.

== Amateur career ==
Hicks attended Sam Rayburn High School in Pasadena, Texas. He attended San Jacinto College before transferring to Texas A&M University, where he played shortstop for the Big 12 Tournament Championship team.

== Professional career ==
=== Atlanta Braves ===
Hicks was drafted by the Braves in the third round (108th overall) of the 2007 Major League Baseball draft. He was promoted to the major leagues for the first time in May 2010.

For the following season, Hicks made the 2011 Opening Day roster of the Atlanta Braves after performing well in that season's Spring training camp. On May 1, just five days short of a year after his Major League debut, Hicks collected his first Major League hit, an RBI single to left-center against Jaime García of the St. Louis Cardinals.

=== Oakland Athletics ===
He was claimed off waivers by the Oakland Athletics on March 13, 2012. Hicks hit his first career home run which was a walk off on July 18, 2012 against the Texas Rangers. Though the rest of the 2012 season he batted .172/.243/.391 in 64 at bats hitting 3 home runs and driving in 8 runs.

=== New York Mets ===
He was traded to the New York Mets on November 26, 2012 for cash considerations.

=== San Francisco Giants ===
Hicks signed a minor league contract with the San Francisco Giants in November 2013. He made the opening day roster due to an injury to second baseman Marco Scutaro. In his first appearance as a Giant he pinch-hit a home run to help the Giants beat the Diamondbacks. Hicks also hit the game-winning home run on April 27 to lift the Giants to a win over Cleveland. He was designated for assignment on July 11, 2014. In his stint with the Giants, Hicks hit .162, with 8 home runs and 22 runs batted in. On December 15, 2014 Hicks signed a minor league contract with the San Francisco Giants.

=== Los Angeles Dodgers ===
On February 1, 2016, he signed a minor league contract with the Los Angeles Dodgers and was assigned to the Triple-A Oklahoma City Dodgers, where he hit .229 in 89 games. He elected free agency following the season on November 7. Hicks retired from professional baseball in the offseason.
