= Andrew Carignan =

American baseball player (born 1986)

- Pitcher
- Born: July 23, 1986 (age 40); New London, Connecticut, U.S.
- Batted: Right Threw: Right

MLB debut
- September 2, 2011, for the Oakland Athletics

Last appearance
- June 5, 2012, for the Oakland Athletics

MLB statistics
- Win–loss record: 1-1
- Earned run average: 4.50
- Strikeouts: 13
- Stats at Baseball Reference

Teams
- Oakland Athletics (2011–2012)

Gary Andrew Carignan (born July 23, 1986) is a former professional baseball pitcher. He played in Major League Baseball (MLB) for the Oakland Athletics.

== Amateur career ==
Born in New London, Connecticut, Carignan attended high school at Norwich Free Academy where he played with Eric Campbell and was named Connecticut's top baseball player in 2003 after leading the team to a state championship. He played college baseball for the University of North Carolina Tar Heels. In 2005 and 2006, he played collegiate summer baseball in the Cape Cod Baseball League for the Bourne Braves, and was named an all-star in 2006.

== Professional career ==
=== Oakland Athletics ===
Carignan was selected by the Oakland Athletics in the 5th round, with the 180th overall selection, of the 2007 Major League Baseball draft. He made his professional debut with the Single-A Kane County Cougars. In 2008, Carignan made 55 relief appearances split between the High-A Stockton Ports and Double-A Midland RockHounds, compiling a 4-4 record and 2.01 ERA with 84 strikeouts and 28 saves across 62 2/3 innings pitched.

Carignan made two appearances for Stockton in 2009, recording a 4.50 ERA with two strikeouts. He returned to the Ports in 2010, registering a 3-3 record and 6.27 ERA with 44 strikeouts over 30 appearances out of the bullpen. Carignan spent time in 2011 split between the Triple-A Sacramento River Cats, Midland, and Stockton, accumulating a 1-0 record and 1.85 ERA with 46 strikeouts and eight saves across 33 appearances.

On September 2, 2011, Carignan was selected to the 40-man roster and promoted to the major leagues for the first time. In six appearances for Oakland during his rookie campaign, Carignan recorded a 4.26 ERA with five strikeouts across 6 1/3 innings pitched.

Carignan collected his first MLB win on April 11, 2012, against the Kansas City Royals; in the game, Carignan took over from fellow reliever Jordan Norberto, and recorded the win when Seth Smith reached on a fielding error. Jemile Weeks and Eric Sogard were subsequently walked, loading the bases. Coco Crisp then grounded out, scoring Smith, and Yoenis Céspedes was hit by a pitch, reloading the bases; the game ended in the bottom of the twelfth inning when Jonny Gomes was hit, forcing in the winning run. In 11 outings for Oakland, he posted a 1-1 record and 4.66 ERA with eight strikeouts across 9 2/3 innings pitched. On June 19, 2012, Carignan underwent Tommy John surgery, ending his season prematurely, and causing him to miss all of the 2013 campaign as well.

=== San Francisco Giants ===
On December 18, 2013, Carignan signed a minor league contract with the San Francisco Giants. He made 30 appearances split between the Double-A Richmond Flying Squirrels and Triple-A Fresno Grizzlies, accumulating a combined 1-2 record and 4.69 ERA with 39 strikeouts across 40 1/3 innings pitched. Carignan became a free agent after the season.

=== Somerset Patriots ===
On March 23, 2015, Carignan signed with the Somerset Patriots of the Atlantic League of Professional Baseball. In 54 appearances for the Patriots, he compiled a 2-2 record and 2.52 ERA with 57 strikeouts and four saves across 53 2/3 innings pitched.

Carignan announced his retirement from professional baseball on January 29, 2016.

== Personal life ==
Carignan's great-grandfather Gus Dugas played in MLB in the early 1930s as an outfielder for the Pittsburgh Pirates, Philadelphia Phillies, and Washington Senators.
