= Brandon Allen (baseball) =

American baseball player (born 1986)

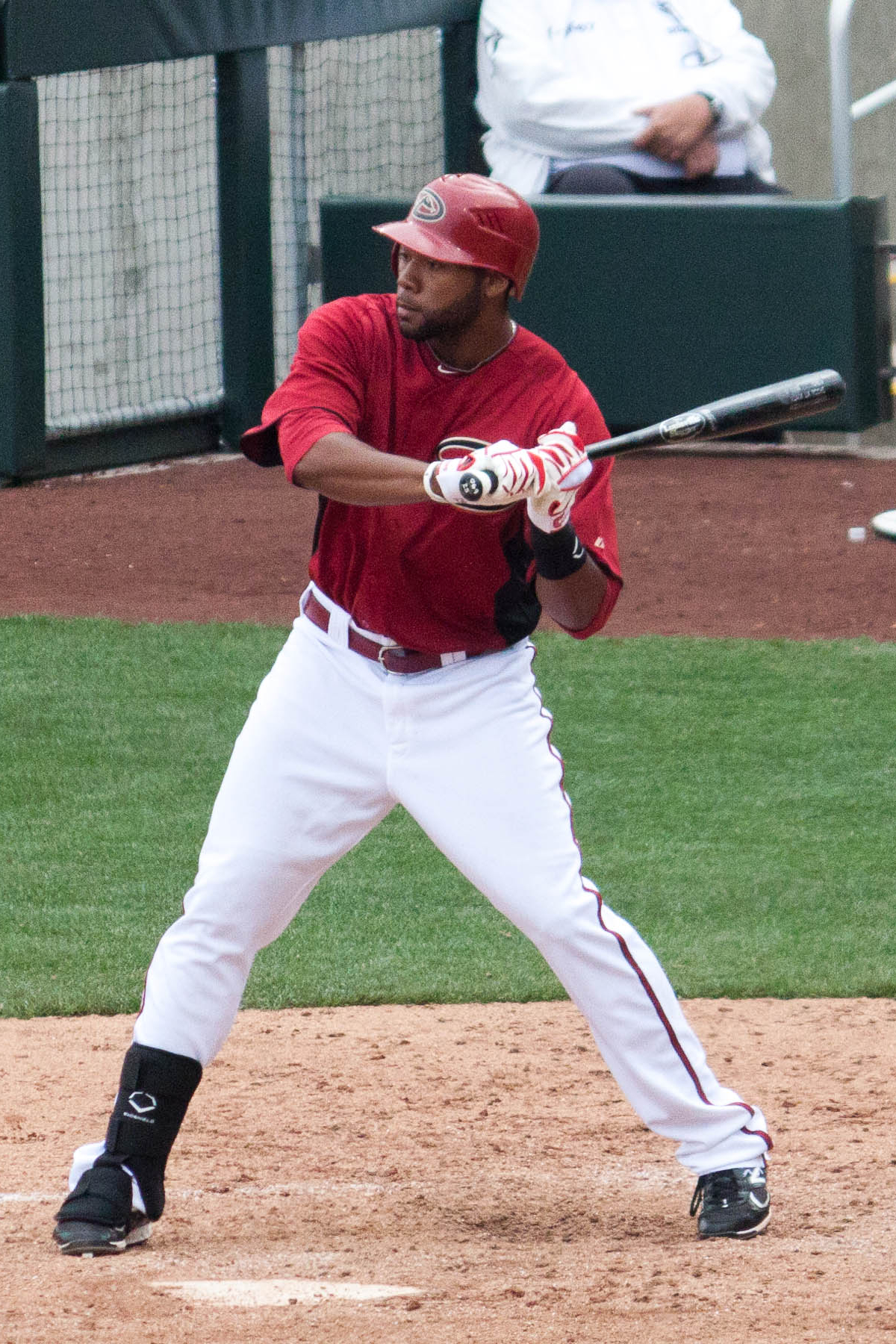
- Allen with the Arizona Diamondbacks

St. Louis Cardinals – No. 87
- First baseman / Coach
- Born: February 12, 1986 (age 40); Conroe, Texas, U.S.
- Batted: Left Threw: Right

Professional debut
- MLB: August 22, 2009, for the Arizona Diamondbacks
- NPB: August 12, 2012, for the Fukuoka SoftBank Hawks

Last appearance
- MLB: May 9, 2012, for the Tampa Bay Rays
- NPB: August 25, 2012, for the Fukuoka SoftBank Hawks

MLB statistics
- Batting average: .203
- Home runs: 12
- Runs batted in: 41

NPB statistics
- Batting average: .171
- Home runs: 0
- Runs batted in: 1
- Stats at Baseball Reference

Teams
- As player: Arizona Diamondbacks (2009–2011); Oakland Athletics (2011–2012); Tampa Bay Rays (2012); Fukuoka SoftBank Hawks (2012); As coach: St. Louis Cardinals (2023–present)

Brandon Durell Allen (born February 12, 1986) is an American professional baseball coach and former first baseman who is the assistant hitting coach for the St. Louis Cardinals of Major League Baseball (MLB). He played in MLB for the Arizona Diamondbacks, Oakland Athletics, and Tampa Bay Rays and in Nippon Professional Baseball (NPB) for the Fukuoka SoftBank Hawks.

== Professional career ==
=== Chicago White Sox ===
Allen was drafted by the Chicago White Sox in the fifth round of the 2004 Major League Baseball draft.

=== Arizona Diamondbacks ===
On July 7, 2009, Allen was traded from the White Sox to the Arizona Diamondbacks in exchange for pitcher Tony Peña. Allen was called up to the majors for the first time on August 22, and made his debut that day. He finished the game one for four with a single. Allen would play in 32 games that season and finished with a .202 batting average, four home runs, and 14 RBI.

After spending most of the 2010 season with the Triple-A Reno Aces, Allen was called up on September 1, 2010. In his first game against the San Diego Padres, he hit his first career grand slam. He finished the season with a .267 batting average in 22 games.

=== Oakland Athletics ===
On July 31, 2011, Allen was traded to the Oakland Athletics with Jordan Norberto for Brad Ziegler. He was subsequently optioned to the Triple-A Sacramento River Cats. On August 23, Allen became only the second player in history to hit a home run into the upper deck at the new Yankee Stadium (Russell Branyan being the first). Later in the game he hit a shorter home run into the second deck to help the Athletics defeat the New York Yankees, 6–5. Allen made 41 total appearances for Oakland during the year, slashing .205/.259/.356 with three home runs, 11 RBI, and two stolen bases.

On April 9, 2012, Allen was designated for assignment by the Athletics; he had gone 0-for-7 in three games for Oakland prior to that point.

=== Tampa Bay Rays ===
On April 19, 2012, Allen was claimed off waivers by the Tampa Bay Rays. Allen later had his first career hit as a member of the Rays, a two-run walk-off home run against the Los Angeles Angels of Anaheim which resulted in the Rays sweeping the series. In seven games for Tampa Bay, he went 2-for-13 (.154) with one home run and three RBI. On June 6, Allen was designated for assignment by the Rays upon being activated from the disabled list. He cleared waivers and was sent outright to the Triple-A Durham Bulls on June 8. In 29 games for Durham, Allen batted .262/.295/.451 with four home runs and 14 RBI.

=== Fukuoka SoftBank Hawks ===
On July 27, 2012, Allen's contractual rights were sold to the Fukuoka SoftBank Hawks of Nippon Professional Baseball. He would go on to play in 12 contests for Fukuoka, batting .171/.194/.200 with one RBI.

=== San Diego Padres ===
On December 6, 2012, Allen signed a minor league contract with the Texas Rangers that included an invitation to spring training. He was released by Texas prior to the start of the regular season on April 1, 2013.

On April 9, 2013, Allen signed a minor league contract with the San Diego Padres organization. He spent the year with the Triple-A Tucson Padres, where he was used mostly at first base, but also played in 40 games in left field. In 119 games with Tucson, Allen hit .267 with 17 home runs, 76 RBI, and 24 doubles.

=== New York Mets ===
On November 19, 2013, Allen signed a minor league contract with the New York Mets. He made 103 appearances split between the High-A St. Lucie Mets and Triple-A Las Vegas 51s, batting a combined .276/.385/.445 with 13 home runs and 57 RBI.

On November 14, 2014, Allen re-signed with the Mets organization on a minor league contract. He spent the 2015 campaign back with Syracuse, slashing .273/.350/.478 with 16 home runs and 68 RBI across 124 games.

=== Cincinnati Reds ===
On November 30, 2015, Allen signed a minor league contract with the Cincinnati Reds. On April 8, 2016, Allen had his contract purchased by the Reds, adding him to their active roster. He did not appear in a game for Cincinnati during his brief time with the team. On April 10, Allen was designated for assignment following the promotion of Tim Melville; later that day, he cleared waivers and was sent outright to the Triple-A Louisville Bats. He made 67 appearances for the Bats during the year, hitting .177/.285/.268 with four home runs and 17 RBI. Allen became a free agent on October 11.

== Coaching career ==
On June 22, 2017, Allen became the hitting coach for the Johnson City Cardinals, the Rookie-league affiliate of the St. Louis Cardinals. In 2018, he was promoted to be the hitting coach of the Single-A Palm Beach Cardinals. He was named hitting coach for the Double-A Springfield Cardinals in 2019, and was again promoted to become the hitting coach of the Triple-A Memphis Redbirds in 2020.

On November 6, 2022, Allen became the assistant hitting coach for the Cardinals, earning his first major league coaching position.
