= Ryan Cook (baseball) =

American baseball player (born 1987)

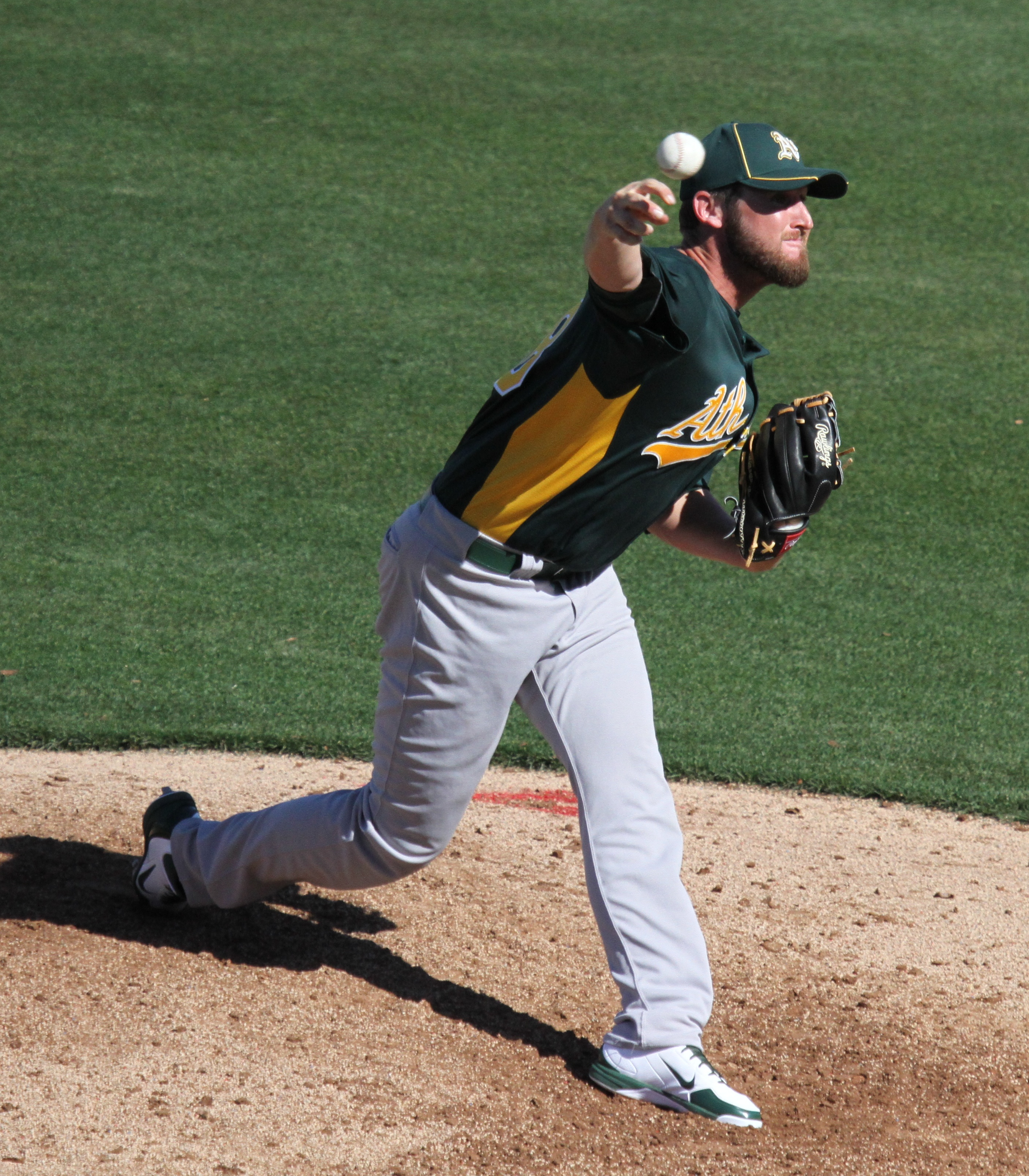
- Cook with the Oakland Athletics
- Pitcher
- Born: June 30, 1987 (age 38); Clovis, California, U.S.
- Batted: Right Threw: Right

Professional debut
- MLB: July 20, 2011, for the Arizona Diamondbacks
- NPB: March 30, 2019, for the Yomiuri Giants

Last appearance
- MLB: September 27, 2018, for the Seattle Mariners
- NPB: September 10, 2019, for the Yomiuri Giants

MLB statistics
- Win–loss record: 15–13
- Earned run average: 3.58
- Strikeouts: 233

NPB statistics
- Win–loss record: 0–2
- Earned run average: 4.80
- Strikeouts: 9
- Saves: 6
- Stats at Baseball Reference

Teams
- Arizona Diamondbacks (2011); Oakland Athletics (2012–2015); Boston Red Sox (2015); Seattle Mariners (2018); Yomiuri Giants (2019)

Career highlights and awards
- All-Star (2012)

Ryan William Cook (born June 30, 1987), nicknamed "Cookie", is an American former professional baseball pitcher. He played for the Arizona Diamondbacks, Oakland Athletics, Boston Red Sox and Seattle Mariners of Major League Baseball (MLB) and for the Yomiuri Giants of Nippon Professional Baseball (NPB). He was an MLB All-Star in 2012.

== Career ==
=== Amateur ===
Cook attended Clovis High School in Clovis, California, and the University of Southern California (USC), where he played college baseball for the USC Trojans baseball team. In 2007, he played collegiate summer baseball with the Brewster Whitecaps of the Cape Cod Baseball League.

=== Arizona Diamondbacks ===
The Arizona Diamondbacks selected Cook in the 27th round of the 2008 Major League Baseball draft. He was called up to the majors for the first time on July 20, 2011.

=== Oakland Athletics ===
On December 9, 2011, the Diamondbacks traded Cook, along with Jarrod Parker and Collin Cowgill, to the Oakland Athletics for Trevor Cahill and Craig Breslow.

On April 27, 2012, against the Baltimore Orioles, Cook became the 61st player in MLB history to record four strikeouts in one inning. He was the Athletics' representative at the 2012 All-Star Game where he pitched a perfect seventh inning. In 2013, Cook repeated his 2012 performance by going 6–4 in 71 games. He had a 2.54 earned run average with 67 strikeouts in 67 innings pitched. Despite a pair of injuries during the 2014 season, Cook appeared in 54 games.

=== Boston Red Sox ===
On July 31, 2015, Cook was traded to the Boston Red Sox for a player to be named later.

=== Seattle Mariners ===
Cook was claimed off waivers by the Chicago Cubs on November 6, 2015, however his contract was non-tendered on December 2, making Cook a free agent.

On January 7, 2016, Cook signed a one-year deal with the Seattle Mariners. He was outrighted to the minors on November 2, 2016. He elected free agency on November 7, however he re-signed a new minor league contract on November 14.

Cook missed the entire 2017 season after having Tommy John surgery.

Cook began the 2018 season with the Triple–A Tacoma Rainiers and impressed with a 2.03 ERA and 17 strikeouts in 13 1/3 innings pitched. He was called up to the Mariners on May 17, 2018. He was sent outright to the minor leagues on October 31, he elected free agency the next day.

=== Yomiuri Giants ===
On December 29, 2018, Cook signed with the Yomiuri Giants of Nippon Professional Baseball (NPB).

On December 2, 2019, he became a free agent.

=== Miami Marlins ===
On January 6, 2020, Cook signed a minor league deal with the Miami Marlins. Cook was released by the Marlins organization on July 20, 2020.

== See also ==
- List of Major League Baseball single-inning strikeout leaders
