= Jarrod Parker =

American baseball player (born 1988)

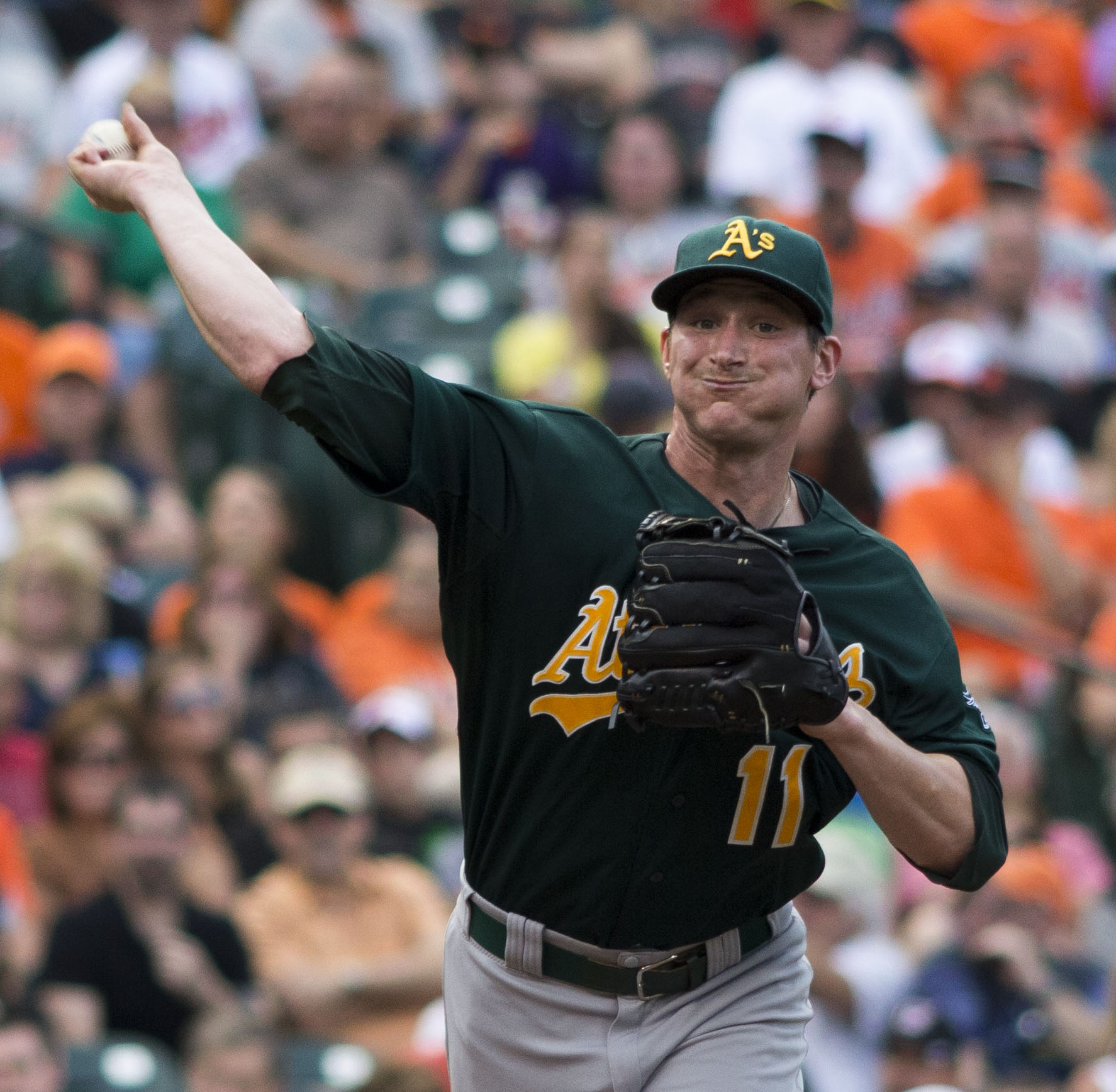
- Parker with the Oakland Athletics
- Pitcher
- Born: November 24, 1988 (age 37); Fort Wayne, Indiana, U.S.
- Batted: Right Threw: Right

MLB debut
- September 27, 2011, for the Arizona Diamondbacks

Last MLB appearance
- September 28, 2013, for the Oakland Athletics

MLB statistics
- Win–loss record: 25–16
- Earned run average: 3.68
- Strikeouts: 275
- Stats at Baseball Reference

Teams
- Arizona Diamondbacks (2011); Oakland Athletics (2012–2013)
Medals
Men's baseball
Representing United States
World Junior Baseball Championship
Silver medal – second place	2006 Sancti Spíritus	Team

Jarrod Parker (born November 24, 1988) is an American former professional baseball pitcher. He was drafted by the Arizona Diamondbacks as the 9th overall pick in the 2007 Major League Baseball draft from Norwell High School in Ossian, Indiana. He played in Major League Baseball (MLB) for the Diamondbacks and the Oakland Athletics.

== Professional career ==
=== Arizona Diamondbacks ===
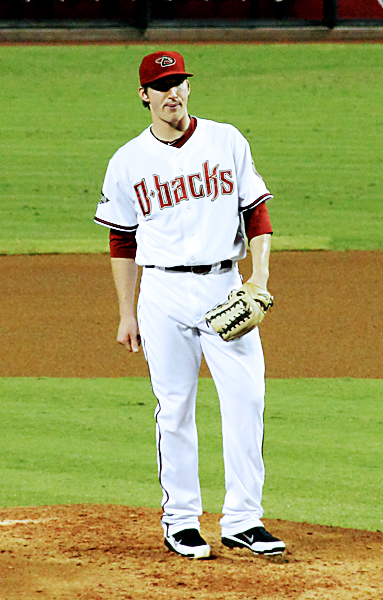
Parker pitching for the Arizona Diamondbacks in 2011.

Parker was drafted by the Arizona Diamondbacks with the 9th overall pick of the 2007 amateur draft and signed with the Diamondbacks on August 15, 2007, for $2.1M. Parker was the first high school arm taken in the draft. It took Parker up until just a few hours prior to the deadline for draftees to sign, as he was weighing his options and had Georgia Tech as his fallback plan.

After signing late, he missed out on pro-ball in the 2007 season, but he jumped right into Single-A in 2008 and held his own as a 19-year-old, pitching for the South Bend Silver Hawks. He had a 12–5 record with a 3.44 ERA, fanning 177 in 117 innings. After starting 2009 at high-A Visalia, he was promoted in April to the Diamondbacks Double-A affiliate, the Mobile BayBears. During a start on July 30, Parker injured his right elbow. He did not pitch again that season and ended up requiring Tommy John surgery, which took place on October 28, 2009, and thus and missed the entire 2010 season.

He spent the 2011 season with the Mobile BayBears in the Southern League, with an 11–8 record. He made his MLB debut on 27 September 2011, against the Dodgers. He pitched five-plus innings of shutout ball.

=== Oakland Athletics ===
On December 9, 2011, the Diamondbacks traded Parker, Collin Cowgill and Ryan Cook to the Oakland Athletics for Trevor Cahill and Craig Breslow.

After spending the early part of the 2012 season at the Triple-A level, Parker joined the Athletics' starting rotation in late April.

On June 4, 2012, Parker no-hit the Texas Rangers for seven innings before surrendering a single to Michael Young to lead off the eighth.

Parker was Game 1 and 5 starter for the 2012 ALDS against the Detroit Tigers. Parker took losses for both games as he went up against Tigers ace Justin Verlander. Parker finished the 2012 season with a 13–8 record with 140 strikeouts with an era of 3.47 while finishing 5th for rookie of the year

During the 2013 season, Parker set a franchise record nineteen consecutive starts without a loss. He finished the season with a record of 12-8 and an era of 3.97. He was also the starter of Game 3 of the ALDS going 5 innings with his first postseason win.

Parker was projected to be named the A's Opening Day starter for the 2014 season, but it was announced on March 17, 2014, that Parker would undergo his second Tommy John surgery, which would cause him to miss the 2014 season.

In 2015, while pitching in a rehab assignment, Parker fractured his elbow, which led to surgery.

In March 2016, Parker once again fractured his elbow and underwent surgery on April 1.

Parker was outrighted to the Triple-A Nashville Sounds on October 7, 2016, and he then elected free agency.

=== Retirement ===
Parker announced his retirement from baseball on February 13, 2018. Parker said he'd look to work in the health industry, potentially serving as a rehab coordinator for players returning from injury.

== Coaching career ==
On February 5, 2024, the Philadelphia Phillies hired Parker to serve as the pitching coach for their rookie–level affiliate, the Florida Complex League Phillies.

== Pitching style ==
Parker threw five pitches. His main pitch was a four-seam fastball thrown 92–95 mph that he threw for about half of his pitches. He also had a two-seam fastball at 90–94. His main off-speed pitch was a changeup in the low 80s, and he also had a slider and occasional curveball. The two-seamer and changeup were used primarily on left-handed hitters, as their movement tailed away toward the outside corner. Likewise, Parker did not use his two-seamer to right-handers at all, and he only employed his slider against right-handers. Parker used his changeup heavily in 2-strike counts.

Parker described his pitching approach as such:

I'm aggressive. I like to attack the zone, down ... Early on, I want to establish the fastball down and be as aggressive as I can, but in certain counts I'll want to raise the hitter's eye level, then come back with a curveball. Less damage can be done when the ball is down. For me, ground balls are better than fly balls. That's something I really push for, because down in the zone with some movement is going to be a little harder to hit. But changing eye levels by going up in the zone is important. It's tough for a hitter to lock in when you're moving the ball up and down.
