= Graham Godfrey =

American baseball player (born 1984)

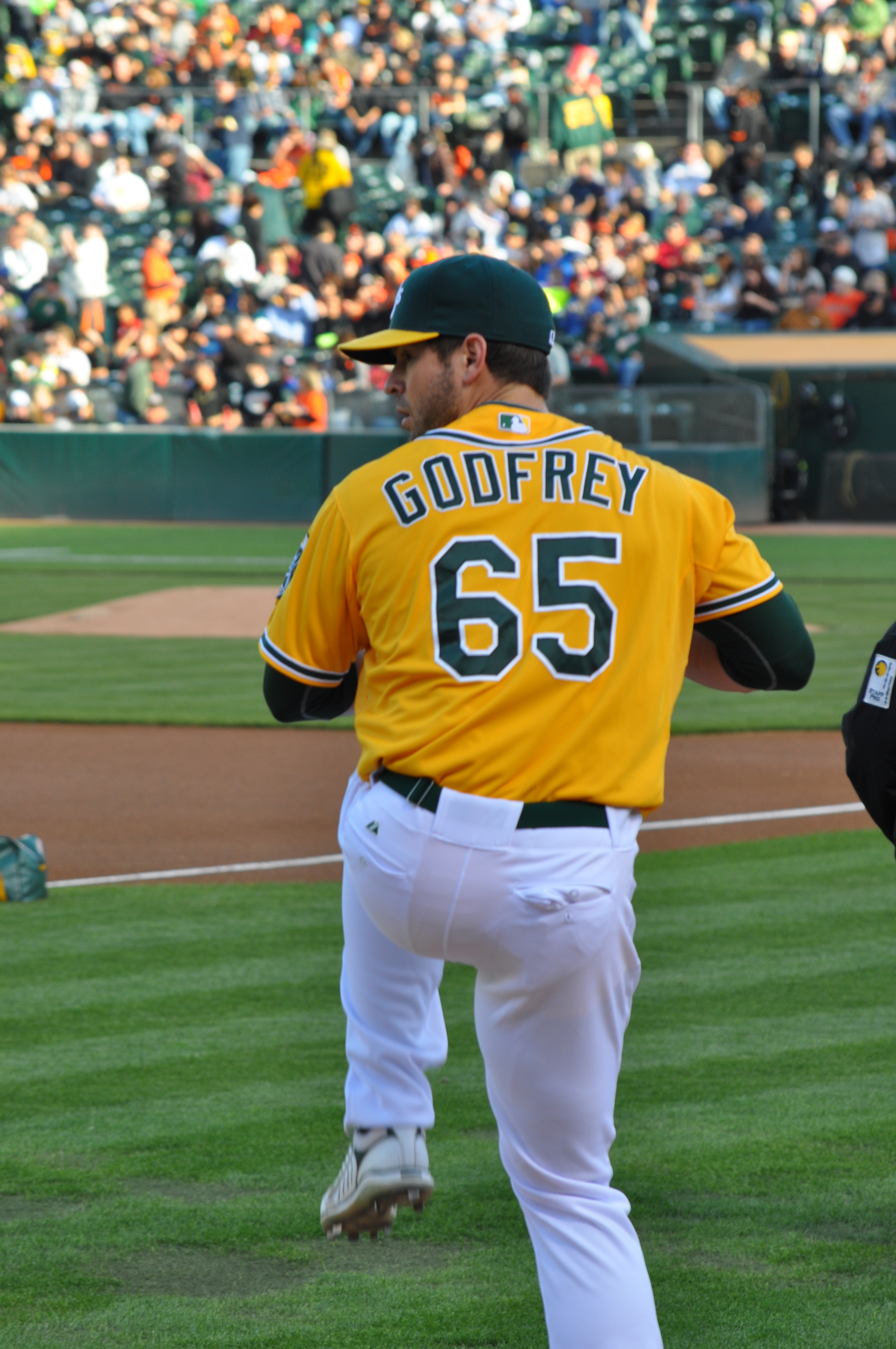
- Godfrey with the Oakland Athletics in 2011
- Pitcher
- Born: August 9, 1984 (age 42); Tampa, Florida, U.S.
- Batted: Right Threw: Right

MLB debut
- June 10, 2011, for the Oakland Athletics

Last MLB appearance
- May 26, 2012, for the Oakland Athletics

MLB statistics
- Win–loss record: 1–6
- Earned run average: 5.09
- Strikeouts: 23
- Stats at Baseball Reference

Teams
- Oakland Athletics (2011–2012)

Graham Hunter Godfrey (born August 9, 1984) is an American professional baseball pitcher. He played in Major League Baseball (MLB) for the Oakland Athletics in 2011 and 2012.

== Career ==
=== Amateur ===
Godfrey attended Memorial High School in Houston, Texas and the College of Charleston. In 2006, he played collegiate summer baseball with the Cotuit Kettleers of the Cape Cod Baseball League.

=== Toronto Blue Jays ===
Godfrey was drafted by the Toronto Blue Jays in the 34th round (1,020th overall) of the 2006 Major League Baseball draft. He played for the Single-A Lansing Lugnuts in 2007, compiling a 6-7 record and 3.98 ERA with 74 strikeouts in 110 2/3 innings pitched across 21 starts.

=== Oakland Athletics ===
On November 18, 2007, Godfrey was traded to the Oakland Athletics with Kristian Bell in exchange for Marco Scutaro.

Godfrey was promoted to the major leagues to make his major league debut on June 10, 2011 against the Chicago White Sox. In his debut, Godfrey pitched 4 1/3 innings giving up nine hits and five runs, walking two and striking out two, earning the no-decision in the eventual 7-5 win. Godfrey's first major league strikeout was of Gordon Beckham. The game was also interim manager Bob Melvin's first win with the Oakland Athletics Godfrey fared much better in his second major league start on June 17. Facing the defending World Series champion San Francisco Giants in front of a sold out crowd in Oakland, Godfrey picked up his first career win, going seven innings, allowing six hits and two runs (one earned) while striking out three and walking none. In five appearances (four starts) for Oakland during his rookie campaign, he compiled a 1-2 record and 3.96 ERA with 13 strikeouts over 25 innings of work.

Godfrey made another five appearances (four starts) for the Athletics during the 2012 season, but struggled to an 0-4 record and 6.43 ERA with 10 strikeouts over 21 innings of work.

=== Boston Red Sox ===
On December 7, 2012, Godfrey was traded to the Boston Red Sox as the player to be named later in a previous deal. Godfrey made 13 appearances (four starts) for the Triple-A Pawtucket Red Sox, registering a 4-3 record and 3.83 ERA with 30 strikeouts across 42 1/3 innings pitched.

=== Pittsburgh Pirates ===
On May 31, 2013, Godfrey was once again traded, this time to the Pittsburgh Pirates in exchange for cash considerations. He made 19 appearances (11 starts) for the Triple-A Indianapolis Indians, compiling a 7-5 record and 3.99 ERA with 45 strikeouts across 76 2/3 innings pitched.

=== Arizona Diamondbacks ===
On August 3, 2014, Godfrey signed a minor league contract with the Arizona Diamondbacks organization. He made six appearances (two starts) split between the rookie-level Arizona League Diamondbacks and Double-A Mobile BayBears, accumulating a 1-1 record and 3.86 ERA with 14 strikeouts across 16 1/3 innings pitched. Godfrey elected free agency following the season on November 4.
