= Travis Blackley =

Australian baseball player (born 1982)

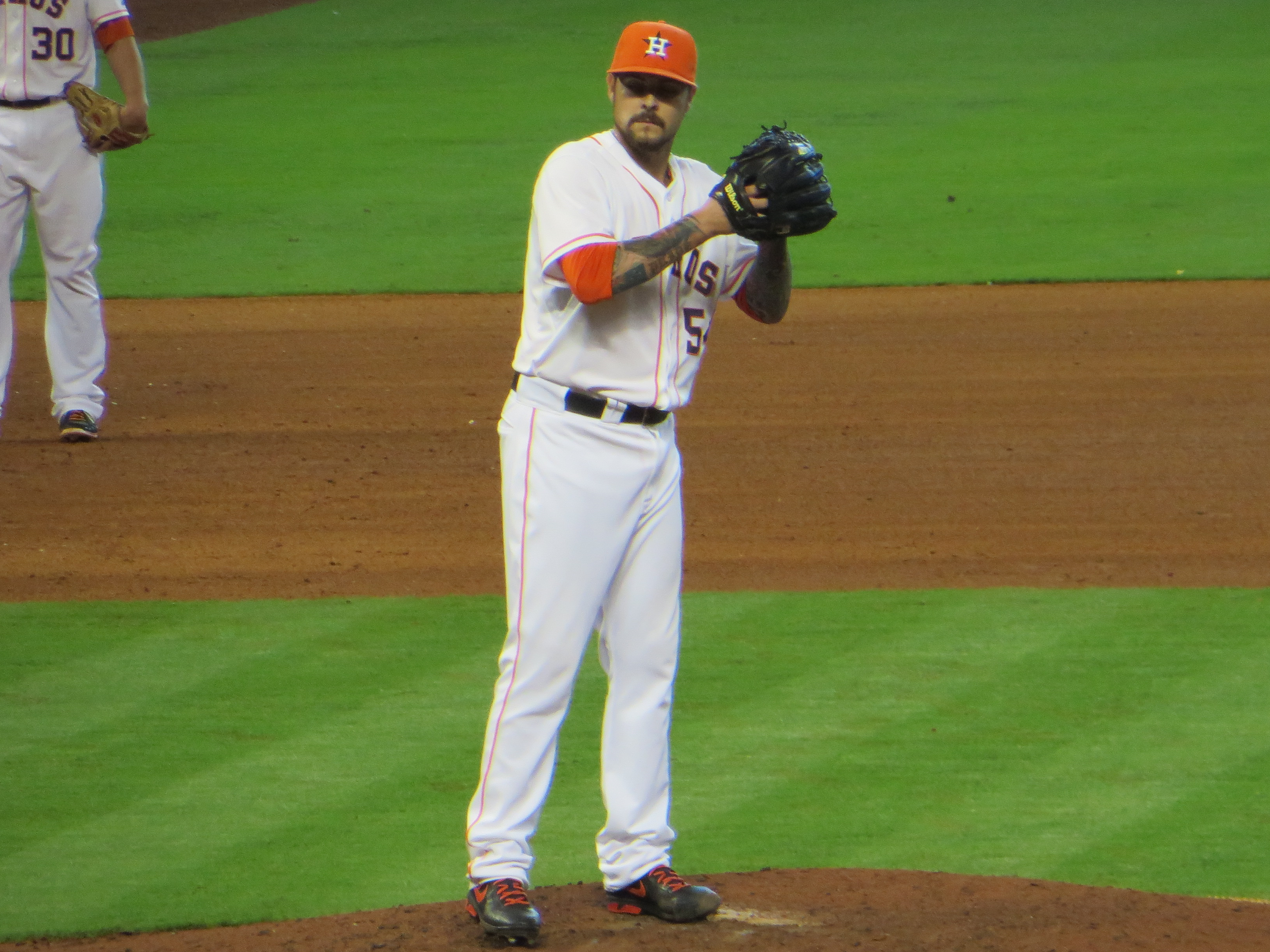
- Blackley with the Houston Astros
- Pitcher
- Born: 4 November 1982 (age 43); Melbourne, Australia
- Batted: Left Threw: Left

Professional debut
- MLB: 1 July, 2004, for the Seattle Mariners
- KBO: 3 April, 2011, for the Kia Tigers
- NPB: 25 May, 2014, for the Tohoku Rakuten Golden Eagles

Last appearance
- MLB: 13 September, 2013, for the Texas Rangers
- KBO: 2011, for the Kia Tigers
- NPB: 2014, for the Tohoku Rakuten Golden Eagles

MLB statistics
- Win–loss record: 9–9
- Earned run average: 5.23
- Strikeouts: 132

KBO statistics
- Win–loss record: 7–5
- Earned run average: 3.48
- Strikeouts: 115

NPB statistics
- Win–loss record: 1–2
- Earned run average: 5.54
- Strikeouts: 7
- Stats at Baseball Reference

Teams
- Seattle Mariners (2004); San Francisco Giants (2007); Kia Tigers (2011); San Francisco Giants (2012); Oakland Athletics (2012); Houston Astros (2013); Texas Rangers (2013); Tohoku Rakuten Golden Eagles (2014)

Travis Jarred Blackley (born 4 November 1982) is an Australian former professional baseball pitcher. He played in Major League Baseball (MLB) for the Seattle Mariners, San Francisco Giants, Oakland Athletics, Houston Astros, and Texas Rangers. Blackley also played in the KBO League for the Kia Tigers and in Nippon Professional Baseball (NPB) for the Tohoku Rakuten Golden Eagles.

Aside from his time in Asia, Blackley also played in the Mexican League (LMB) for the Pericos de Puebla, in Mexican Pacific League (LMP) for the Águilas de Mexicali and Naranjeros de Hermosillo, and in the Australian Baseball League (ABL) for the Brisbane Bandits and Melbourne Aces.

== Professional career ==
=== Seattle Mariners ===
Blackley was signed by the Seattle Mariners as an undrafted free agent on 29 October 2000. He began his professional career with the Single-A Everett AquaSox in 2001. He had a 6–1 record with a 3.32 ERA in 14 starts. He also had 90 strikeouts in 78 2/3 innings and held opponents to a .211 batting average.

He pitched for the Single-A San Bernardino Stampede in 2002, going 5–9 and 3.49 in 21 games, starting all but one. He had 152 strikeouts in 121.1 innings, second among all Mariner minor leaguers.

He was promoted to the Double-A San Antonio Missions in 2003, the most impressive of his minor league career. He led the Texas League with 17 wins; was second in ERA (2.61), fourth in strikeouts (144) and fourth in innings pitched (162.1). His 17 wins were the most by a Texas League pitcher since Jeff Reardon of the Jackson Mets in 1978.

He pitched in the Texas League postseason All-Star game and was named to the World squad in the 2003 All-Star Futures Game at U.S. Cellular Field on 15 July. The Mariners also named him their minor league pitcher of the year.

In 2004, Baseball America designated him as #63 out of the top 100 minor league prospects, the third best prospect in the Mariners' system behind pitchers Félix Hernández and Clint Nageotte and their top left-handed prospect. He began the season with the Triple-A Tacoma Rainiers. The Mariners, after trading Freddy García to the Chicago White Sox, needed another starter and purchased Blackley's contract on 1 July 2004. He made his major league debut on that same day against the Texas Rangers and beat them, allowing 4 runs on 6 hits in 5 2/3 innings. He became just the sixth Mariner pitcher in the team's history to start and win his major league debut.

After spending a month with the major league club going only 1–3 with a 10.04 ERA in 6 starts, Blackley was optioned back to Triple-A Tacoma on 1 August 2004. He had an 8–6 record with a 3.83 ERA in 19 games (18 starts) with Tacoma in 2004 before ending the season on the disabled list with left shoulder tendinitis. He missed the entire 2005 season recovering from left shoulder surgery.

In March 2006, Blackley was slated to play in the World Baseball Classic with team Australia but was scratched to continue rehabbing his shoulder.

He spent most of 2006 with Double-A San Antonio. After going 8–11 and 4.06 in 25 starts in Double-A, he was promoted back to Triple-A Tacoma at the end of August where he made 2 starts going 1–1 and 4.09.

=== San Francisco Giants ===
On 1 April 2007, after spring training, he was traded to the San Francisco Giants for outfielder Jason Ellison and was immediately optioned to Triple-A Fresno, pitching the entire season in the minor leagues with the Grizzlies. He went 10–8 with a 4.66 ERA in 28 starts. He was recalled on 21 September, and on 23 September made his first major league start since 31 July 2004 against the Cincinnati Reds. He won his Giant debut, giving up two runs in the first inning and three hits in five innings, walking four and striking out five.

=== Philadelphia Phillies ===
After being outrighted off the San Francisco roster on 6 December 2007, Blackley was selected by the Philadelphia Phillies in the major league portion of the Rule 5 draft.

Philadelphia put him on waivers towards the end of 2008 spring training. The Giants did not reclaim him, and the Phillies outrighted him to Triple-A Lehigh Valley. He became a free agent at the end of the season.

=== Arizona Diamondbacks ===
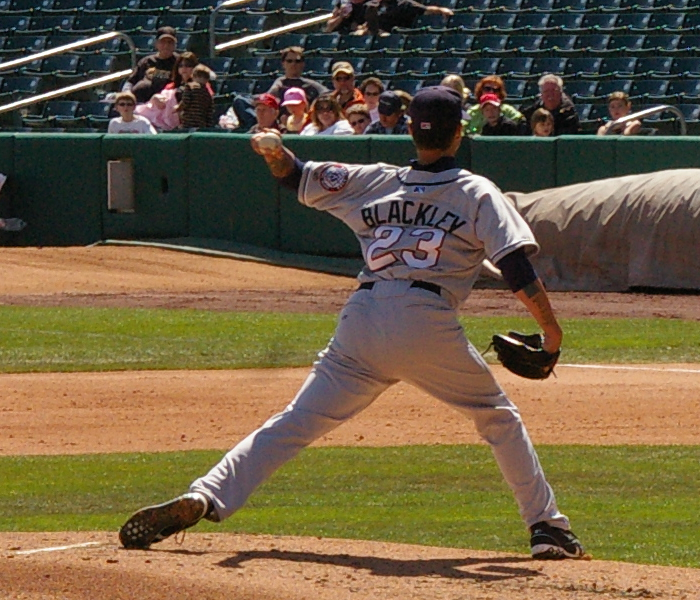
Blackley with the Reno Aces, Triple-A affiliates of the Arizona Diamondbacks, throwing to first base to try to pick off runner in 2009.

On 19 December 2008, he signed a major league contract with the Arizona Diamondbacks. On 1 April 2009, the D'backs outrighted him to Triple-A Reno.

=== New York Mets ===
Blackley began the 2010 season with the New York Mets' AAA affiliate Buffalo Bisons, but the Mets released him on 2 May.

=== Oakland Athletics ===
On 13 May 2010, he signed with the Oakland Athletics who assigned him to their Triple-A affiliate, the Sacramento River Cats.

=== Kia Tigers ===
He ended up with the Kia Tigers in the KBO League in 2011. In 25 appearances, he had a record of 7 wins and 5 losses with an ERA of 3.48.

=== San Francisco Giants (second stint) ===
On 16 February 2012, he signed a minor-league contract with the San Francisco Giants with an invitation to spring training. On 1 May, the Giants purchased his contract and called him up from Triple-A Fresno. He pitched 4 games in relief for the Giants before being designated for assignment on 13 May.

=== Oakland Athletics (second stint) ===
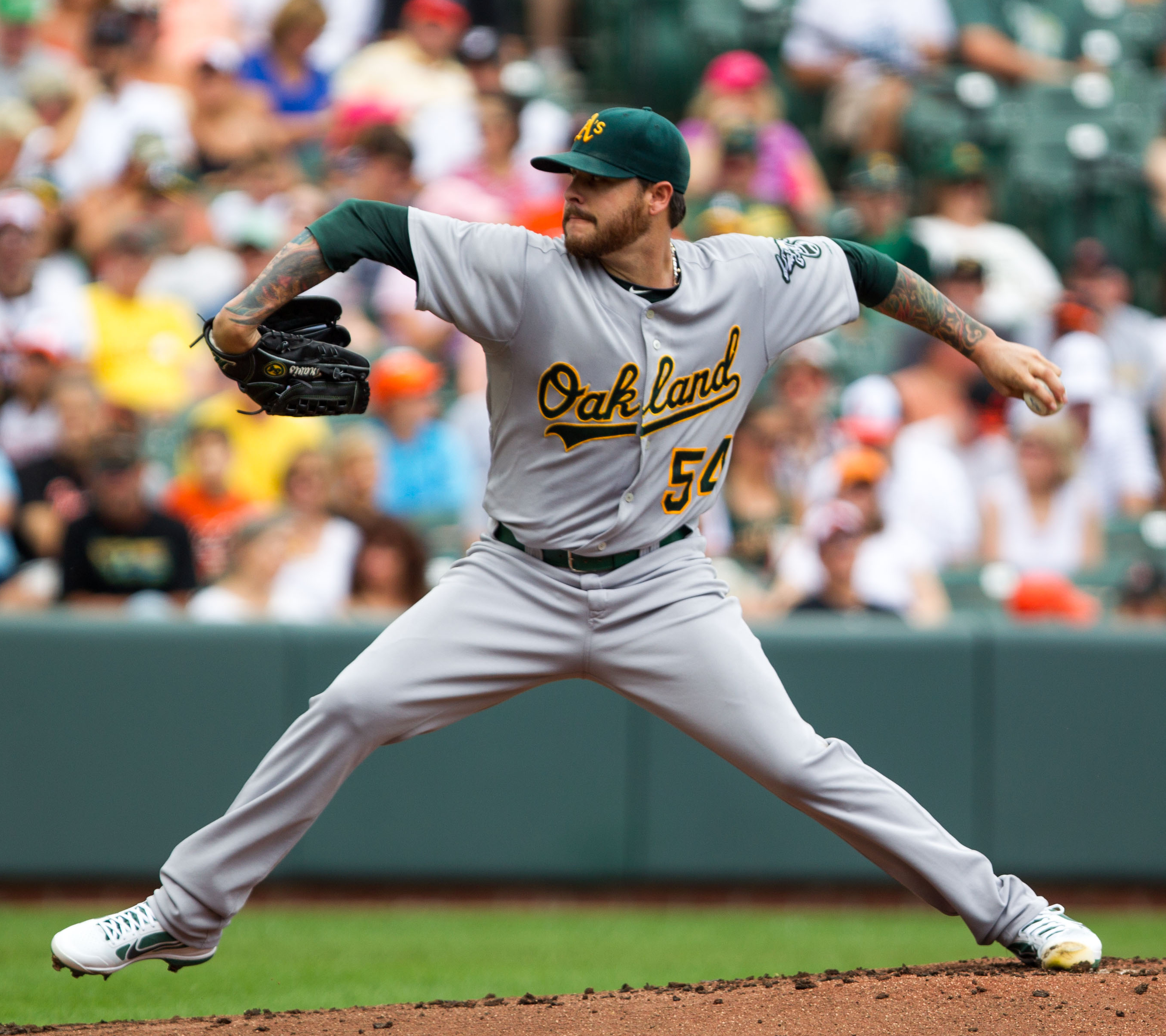
Blackley in 2012

Two days later, on 15 May 2012, the Oakland Athletics claimed him off waivers and signed him. He made his first appearance for the A's on 18 May in relief against the Giants. On 28 May, he started his first game for the team, against the Twins, and was added to the starting rotation. He finished with a 6–4 record and a 3.86 ERA for the season with the A's.

=== Houston Astros ===
On 4 April 2013, the Oakland Athletics traded Blackley to the Houston Astros for outfielder Jake Goebbert. He was designated for assignment on 9 August 2013.

=== Texas Rangers ===
On 14 August 2013, the Houston Astros traded Blackley to the Texas Rangers for a player to be named later. Ironically, Blackley's first appearance with the Rangers was against the Astros on 20 August 2013. Blackley started and pitched 4 innings, allowing 2 runs, as the Rangers won 4–2.

=== Tohoku Rakuten Golden Eagles ===
Blackley signed with the Tohoku Rakuten Golden Eagles in December 2013.

=== San Francisco Giants (third stint) ===
On 12 January 2015, Blackley signed a minor league contract with the San Francisco Giants. He was released in early April.

=== Miami Marlins ===
During the 2015 season, Blackley signed a minor league contract with the Miami Marlins.

=== Pericos de Puebla ===
On 19 April 2016, Blackley signed with the Pericos de Puebla of the Mexican League. He had an 8–8 record and 3.92 ERA.

=== Detroit Tigers ===
On 20 December 2016, Blackely signed a minor league contract with the Detroit Tigers. He was released on 1 April 2017.

=== Return to Puebla ===
On 10 April 2017, Blackley signed with the Pericos de Puebla of the Mexican Baseball League. After a rough start to the season, he was released on 7 May 2017.

=== Pittsburg Diamonds ===
On 6 July 2017, Blackley signed with the Pittsburg Diamonds of the Pacific Association. He re-signed with the team for the 2018 season.

=== Australian Baseball League ===
==== Melbourne Aces ====
Travis made the 35-man roster of the Melbourne Aces for the inaugural Australian Baseball League season in 2010. On 2 December 2010, he was activated onto the 22-man roster and made his debut for the Aces on 5 December starting against the Sydney Blue Sox and pitching a rain-shortened one-hit shutout. He had previously played for the Victoria Aces in the Australian semiprofessional Claxton Shield.

==== Brisbane Bandits ====
Blackley signed with the Brisbane Bandits of the Australian Baseball League for the 2015 season where he helped the Bandits to their first Claxton Shield victory since the re-establishment of the ABL in 2010. He resigned for the 2018 season.

=== Retirement ===
On February 6, 2021, Blackley announced his retirement from professional baseball via Twitter.

In 2024, Blackley was the pitching coach for the Boise Hawks of the independent Pioneer League.

== International career ==
Blackley was selected for the Australian national baseball team at the 2007 Baseball World Cup, 2009 World Baseball Classic, 2017 World Baseball Classic, and 2018 exhibition games against Japan.

Blackley was first selected for Australia in the 2006 World Baseball Classic, but did not play due to an ongoing shoulder injury (as cited above). He debuted for Australia in the 2007 Baseball World Cup and went 0–1 and 1.64 ERA for the tournament, his only loss coming against the Japan when Tadashi Settsu threw a shutout against Australia in the quarter-final, with Australia finishing 5th. He again pitched for Australia in the 2009 World Baseball Classic, earning a no-decision against Cuba and a 1.59 ERA for the tournament.

On 20 February 2018, he was selected exhibition games against Japan.

== Personal life ==
Blackley has a son, born in 2005, from a previous marriage. He married Jenna Blackley on 14 November 2015. They have a son, Bodhi (born 29 November 2016.)

His younger brother, Adam Blackley, formerly played in the Boston Red Sox farm system as well as for the Melbourne Aces in the ABL and the L&D Amsterdam in the Honkbal Hoofdklasse in the Netherlands.

Blackley is an avid supporter of Essendon Football Club.
