= Jordan Norberto =

Dominican baseball player (born 1986)

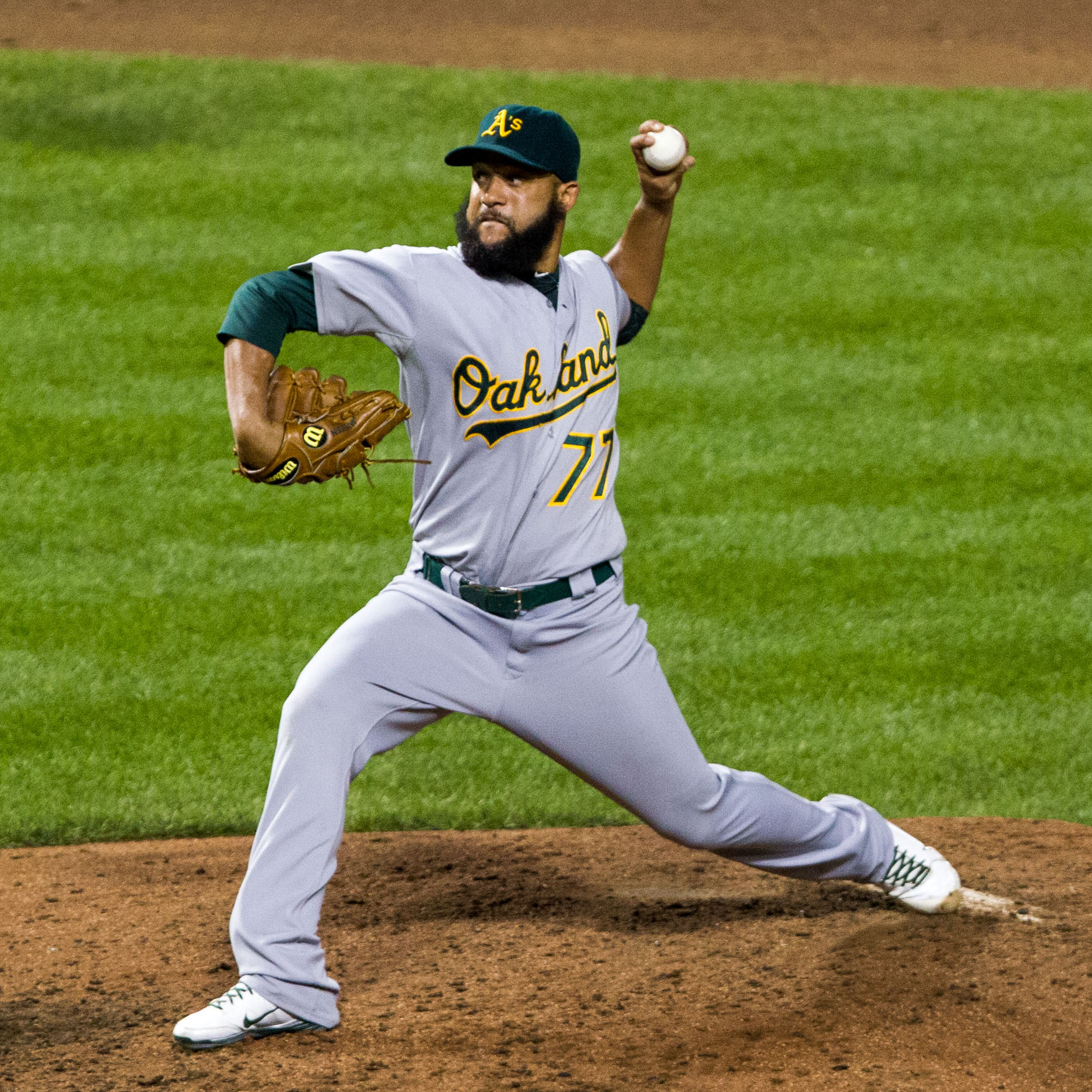
- Norberto with the Oakland Athletics
- Pitcher / Coach
- Born: December 8, 1986 (age 39); Nagua, Dominican Republic
- Batted: Left Threw: Left

Professional debut
- MLB: April 6, 2010, for the Arizona Diamondbacks
- NPB: March 26, 2016, for the Chunichi Dragons

Last appearance
- MLB: August 17, 2012, for the Oakland Athletics
- NPB: October 10, 2017, for the Chunichi Dragons

MLB statistics
- Win–loss record: 4–3
- Earned run average: 4.00
- Strikeouts: 65

NPB statistics (through 2017)
- Win–loss record: 12–10
- Earned run average: 3.50
- Strikeouts: 174
- Stats at Baseball Reference

Teams
- Arizona Diamondbacks (2010); Oakland Athletics (2011–2012); Chunichi Dragons (2016–2017); Tokyo Yakult Swallows (2018)

Jordan Norberto Vallenilla (born December 8, 1986) is a Dominican former professional baseball pitcher. He played in Major League Baseball (MLB) for the Arizona Diamondbacks and Oakland Athletics, and in Nippon Professional Baseball (NPB) for the Chunichi Dragons and Tokyo Yakult Swallows.

== Professional career ==
=== Arizona Diamondbacks ===
Norberto made the Diamondbacks Opening Day roster in 2010.

=== Oakland Athletics ===
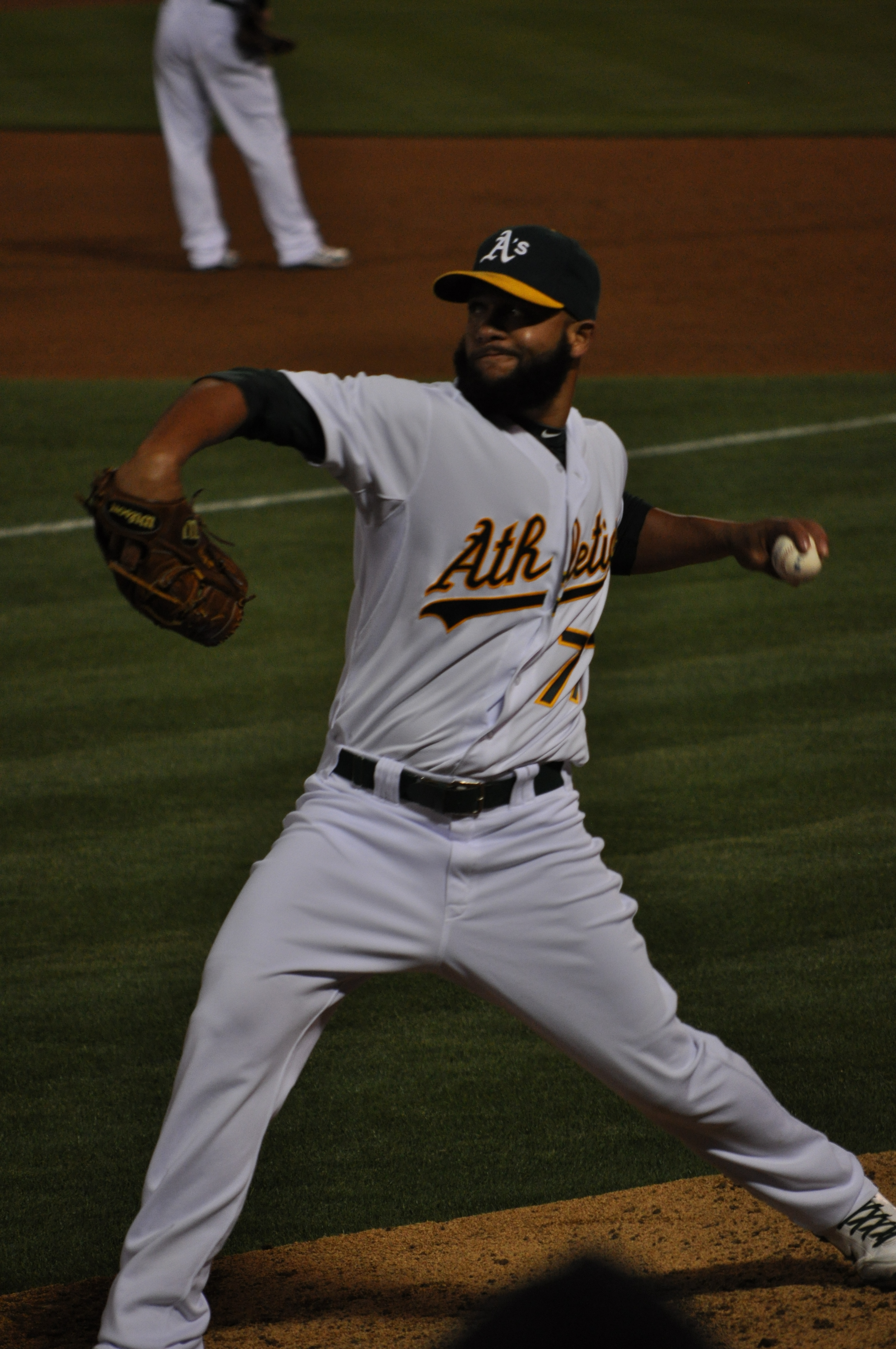
Norberto in the A's bullpen in 2012.

On July 31, 2011, Norberto was traded to the Oakland Athletics with Brandon Allen for Brad Ziegler. He made the Oakland Athletics Opening Day bullpen in 2012. He missed two portions of the season on the disabled list with shoulder issues. He pitched in 39 games and finished the season with a 2.77 ERA and a 4–1 record. He failed to make the Opening Day bullpen in 2013 and opened the season with AAA Sacramento River Cats. On May 8, 2013, he was released to make room on the 40-man roster for Daric Barton.

On August 5, 2013, Norberto agreed to a 50-game suspension for his role in the Biogenesis baseball scandal.

=== Tampa Bay Rays ===
Norberto signed a minor league deal with the Tampa Bay Rays in January 2014. He was assigned to the Double-A Montgomery Biscuits on January 22.

=== Chunichi Dragons ===
Norberto was signed by the Chunichi Dragons of the NPB to start the 2016 season. Norberto made his first appearance for the Dragons as a relief pitcher but was converted into a starter taking his first win against the Hanshin Tigers on April 15, 2016, in a 6–0 win.

On December 2, 2016, it was announced that Norberto had been released by Chunichi, however by December 23, it was reported that Norberto had been in talks to be re-signed by the Dragons for the 2017 season. It was announced on January 6, 2017, that Norberto had been given a 1-year extension by the Dragons.

=== Tokyo Yakult Swallows ===
On December 16, 2017, Norberto signed with the Tokyo Yakult Swallows of Nippon Professional Baseball (NPB). On June 20, 2018, it was announced that he had been placed on waivers. Norberto has since retired from professional baseball.

== Post-playing career ==
In 2020, Norberto joined the Gigantes del Cibao as the team's bullpen coach.

On April 10, 2024, the Guerreros de Oaxaca of the Mexican League announced Norberto as their pitching coach.

In 2026, Norberto was named as an assistant pitching coach for the DSL Royals Fortuna the rookie-level affiliate of the Kansas City Royals.
