= 2010 Oakland Athletics season =

2010 Oakland Athletics
- League: American League
- Division: West
- Ballpark: Oakland–Alameda County Coliseum
- City: Oakland, California, U.S.
- Record: 81–81 (.500)
- Divisional place: 2nd
- Owners: Lewis Wolff
- General managers: Billy Beane
- Managers: Bob Geren
- Television: Comcast SportsNet California (Glen Kuiper, Ray Fosse)
- Radio: KTRB (Ken Korach, Vince Cotroneo, Ray Fosse)

The Oakland Athletics' 2010 season was their 42nd in Oakland, California. It was also the 110th season in franchise history. The team finished second in the American League West with a record of 81–81.

The Athletics' 2010 season is remembered mainly for Dallas Braden's perfect game. Braden accomplished the feat on May 9, 2010, against the visiting Tampa Bay Rays. The Rays had the league's best record at the time.

The season also saw Oakland's starting rotation improve greatly. The Athletics, led by a trio of promising young starters (Gio González, Trevor Cahill, and Brett Anderson), ultimately posted the American League's lowest earned run average in 2010. All told, the team allowed some 135 fewer runs than it did in 2009. Cahill, along with closer Andrew Bailey, would be rewarded for their strong performance with All-Star selections.

The 2010 season was the only non-losing season of manager Bob Geren's tenure. Geren would ultimately be fired midway through the Athletics' 2011 season.

== Regular season ==
=== Season standings ===
==== American League West ====
AL West
Team	W	L	Pct.	GB	Home	Road
Texas Rangers	90	72	.556	—	51‍–‍30	39‍–‍42
Oakland Athletics	81	81	.500	9	47‍–‍34	34‍–‍47
Los Angeles Angels of Anaheim	80	82	.494	10	43‍–‍38	37‍–‍44
Seattle Mariners	61	101	.377	29	35‍–‍46	26‍–‍55

==== American League Wild Card ====
Division winners
Team	W	L	Pct.
Tampa Bay Rays	96	66	.593
Minnesota Twins	94	68	.580
Texas Rangers	90	72	.556

Wild Card team (Top team qualifies for postseason)
Team	W	L	Pct.	GB
New York Yankees	95	67	.586	—
Boston Red Sox	89	73	.549	6
Chicago White Sox	88	74	.543	7
Toronto Blue Jays	85	77	.525	10
Detroit Tigers	81	81	.500	14
Oakland Athletics	81	81	.500	14
Los Angeles Angels of Anaheim	80	82	.494	15
Cleveland Indians	69	93	.426	26
Kansas City Royals	67	95	.414	28
Baltimore Orioles	66	96	.407	29
Seattle Mariners	61	101	.377	34

==== Record vs. opponents ====
2010 American League record Source: MLB Standings Grid – 2010
Team	BAL	BOS	CWS	CLE	DET	KC	LAA	MIN	NYY	OAK	SEA	TB	TEX	TOR	NL
Baltimore	–	9–9	4–3	3–3	5–5	2–4	6–0	3–5	5–13	3–7	3–6	7–11	6–4	3–15	7–11
Boston	9–9	–	1–6	4–4	3–3	4–3	9–1	3–2	9–9	4–5	7–3	7–11	4–6	12–6	13–5
Chicago	3–4	6–1	–	9–9	8–10	10–8	7–2	5–13	2–4	4–5	9–1	3–4	4–5	3–5	15–3
Cleveland	3–3	4–4	9–9	–	9–9	10–8	5–4	6–12	2–6	3–6	3–4	2–7	2–4	6–4	5–13
Detroit	5–5	3–3	10–8	9–9	–	10–8	6–4	9–9	4–4	3–3	3–5	1–6	3–6	4–4	11–7
Kansas City	4–2	3-4	9–10	8–10	8–10	–	3-7	5–13	3–5	3–6	5–4	4–4	2–7	3–3	8–10
Los Angeles	0–6	1–9	2–7	4–5	4–6	7–3	–	2–5	4–4	11–8	15–4	4–5	9–10	6–3	11–7
Minnesota	5–3	2–3	13–5	12–6	9–9	13–5	5–2	–	2–4	6–3	6-4	3–5	7–3	3–6	8–10
New York	13–5	9–9	4–2	6-2	4–4	5–3	4–4	4–2	–	9–1	6–4	8–10	4–4	8–10	11–7
Oakland	7–3	5–4	5–4	6–3	3–3	6–3	8–11	3–6	1–9	–	13–6	4–5	9–10	3–4	8–10
Seattle	6–3	3–7	1–9	4–3	5–3	4–5	4–15	4–6	4–6	6–13	–	2–7	7–12	2–3	9–9
Tampa Bay	11–7	11–7	4–3	7–2	6–1	4–4	5–4	5–3	10–8	5–4	7–2	–	4–2	10–8	7–11
Texas	4–6	6–4	5–4	4–2	6–3	7–2	10-9	3-7	4-4	10-9	12–7	2–4	–	3–7	14–4
Toronto	15–3	6–12	5–3	4–6	4–4	3–3	3–6	6–3	10–8	4–3	3–2	8–10	7–3	–	7–11

- Source: MLB Standings Grid – 2010

=== Game log ===
Legend
	Athletics win
	Athletics loss
	Postponement
**Bold**	Athletics team member

2010 Game Log
April (12–12)

#	Date	Opponent	Score	Win	Loss	Save	Attendance	Record	Boxscore
1	April 5	Mariners	3–5	League (1–0)	**Ziegler** (0–1)	Aardsma (1)	30,686	1–0	
2	April 6	Mariners	2–1	**Ramírez** (1–0)	Texeira (0–1)		10,090	1–1	
3	April 7	Mariners	6–5	**Blevins** (1–0)	Lowe (0–1)		18,194	2–1	
4	April 8	Mariners	6–2	**Anderson** (1–0)	Fister (0–1)		12,464	3–1	
5	April 9	@ Angels	4–10	**Gonzalez** (1–0)	Palmer (0–1)		40,034	4–1	
6	April 10	@ Angels	3–4	Rodney (1–0)	**Breslow** (0–1)		40,249	4–2	
7	April 11	@ Angels	9–4	**Braden** (1–0)	Saunders (0–2)	**Ross** (1)	40,601	5–2	
8	April 12	@ Mariners	4–0	**Duchscherer** (1–0)	Rowland-Smith (0–1)		45,876	6–2	
9	April 13	@ Mariners	0–3	Fister (1–1)	**Ziegler** (0–2)	Aardsma (3)	18,043	6–3	
10	April 14	@ Mariners	2–4	Vargas (1–1)	**Gaudin** (0–1)	Aardsma (4)	19,978	6–4	
11	April 15	Orioles	6–2	**Sheets** (1–0)	Hernandez (0–2)		17,382	7–4	
12	April 16	Orioles	4–2	**Braden** (2–0)	Millwood (0–2)	**Bailey** (1)	12,225	8–4	
13	April 17	Orioles	4–3	**Blevins** (2–0)	Johnson (0–1)		15,072	9–4	
14	April 18	Orioles	3–8	Matusz (2–0)	**Anderson** (1–1)	Johnson (1)	14,451	9–5	
15	April 20	Yankees	3–7	Vázquez (1–2)	**Gonzalez** (1–1)		19,849	9–6	
16	April 21	Yankees	1–3	Hughes (2–0)	**Sheets** (1–1)	Rivera (6)	30,211	9–7	
17	April 22	Yankees	4–2	**Braden** (3–0)	Sabathia (2–1)	**Bailey** (2)	21,986	10–7	
18	April 23	Indians	10–0	**Duchscherer** (2–0)	Westbrook		11,547	11–7	
19	April 24	Indians	1–6	Carmona (3–0)	**Gaudin** (0–2)		15,873	11–8	
20	April 25	Indians	11–0	**Gonzalez** (2–1)	Masterson (0–3)		16,946	12–8	
21	April 27	@ Rays	6–8	Davis (2–1)	**Sheets** (1–2)	Soriano (5)	10,825	12–9	
22	April 28	@ Rays	3–10	Shields (3–0)	**Braden** (3–1)		10,691	12–10	
23	April 29	@ Blue Jays	3–6	Romero (2–1)	**Duchscherer** (2–1)	Gregg (6)	10,721	12–11	
24	April 30	@ Blue Jays	2–10	Morrow (2–2)	**Cahill** (0–1)		12,722	12–12	

May (16–12)

#	Date	Opponent	Score	Win	Loss	Save	Attendance	Record	Boxscore
25	May 1	@ Blue Jays	4–3	**Gonzalez** (3–1)	Eveland (2–1)	**Bailey** (3)	13,951	13–12	
26	May 2	@ Blue Jays	3–9	Marcum (1–1)	**Sheets** (1–3)		14,725	13–13	
27	May 3	Rangers	2–4	Harden (2–1)	**Braden** (3–2)	Feliz (6)	8,874	13–14	
28	May 4	Rangers	7–6	**Ziegler** (1–2)	Feldman (1–3)	**Bailey** (4)	10,135	14–14	
29	May 5	Rangers	4–1	**Cahill** (1–1)	Lewis (3–1)	**Bailey** (5)	15,403	15–14	
30	May 7	Rays	1–4	Price (4–1)	**Gonzalez** (3–2)	Soriano (8)	19,193	15–15	
31	May 8	Rays	4–2	**Sheets** (2–3)	Davis (3–2)	**Bailey** (6)	15,493	16–15	
32	May 9	Rays	4–0	**Braden** (4–2)	Shields (4–1)		12,228	17–15	
33	May 11	@ Rangers	7–6	**Ross** (1–0)	Nippert (1–3)		15,474	18–15	
34	May 12	@ Rangers	1–10	Holland (1–0)	**Gonzalez** (3–3)		26,625	18–16	
35	May 13	@ Rangers	1–2	Nippert (2–3)	**Bailey** (0–1)		27,507	18–17	
36	May 14	@ Angels	0–4	Saunders (2–5)	**Braden** (4–3)		41,290	18–18	
37	May 15	@ Angels	3–12	Santana (2–3)	**Ross** (1–1)		41,744	18–19	
38	May 16	@ Angels	0–4	Piñeiro (3–4)	**Cahill** (1–2)		41,569	18–20	
39	May 17	Mariners	8–4	**Gonzalez** (4–3)	Rowland-Smith (0–4)		10,051	19–20	
40	May 18	Mariners	6–5	**Breslow** (1–1)	League (3–4)		10,512	20–20	
41	May 19	Tigers	1–5	Verlander (5–2)	**Braden** (4–4)		19,284	20–21	
42	May 20	Tigers	2–5	Bonderman (2–2)	**Ross** (1–2)	Valverde (11)	24,146	20–22	
43	May 21	Giants	6–1	**Cahill** (2–2)	Zito (6–2)		33,369	21–22	
44	May 22	Giants	1–0	**Gonzalez** (5–3)	Cain (2–4)	**Bailey** (7)	35,067	22–22	
45	May 23	Giants	3–0	**Wuertz** (1–0)	Sánchez (2–4)	**Bailey** (8)	35,067	23–22	
46	May 25	@ Orioles	1–5	Guthrie (3–4)	**Ross** (1–3)		14,686	23–23	
47	May 26	@ Orioles	6–1	**Cahill** (3–2)	Matusz (2–5)		19,153	24–23	
48	May 27	@ Orioles	7–5	**Wuertz** (2–0)	Hendrickson (1–3)	**Bailey** (9)	26,279	25–23	
49	May 28	@ Tigers	5–4	**Ziegler** (2–2)	Perry (1–4)	**Bailey** (10)	40,210	26–23	
50	May 29	@ Tigers	6–0	**Anderson** (2–1)	Porcello (4–5)		39,750	27–23	
51	May 30	@ Tigers	2–10	Scherzer (2–4)	**Braden** (4–5)		32,510	27–24	
52	May 31	@ Tigers	4–1	**Cahill** (4–2)	Verlander (5–4)	**Bailey** (11)	23,641	28–24	

June (10–17)

#	Date	Opponent	Score	Win	Loss	Save	Attendance	Record	Boxscore
53	June 1	@ Red Sox	4–9	Lackey (6–3)	**Ross** (1–4)		37,337	28–25	
54	June 2	@ Red Sox	4–6	Matsuzaka (4–2)	**Sheets** (2–4)	Papelbon (13)	37,783	28–26	
55	June 3	@ Red Sox	9–8	**Mazzaro** (1–0)	Wakefield (1–4)	**Bailey** (12)	37,386	29–26	
56	June 4	Twins	4–5 (11)	Guerrier (1–1)	**Bailey** (0–2)	Rauch (14)	21,703	29–27	
57	June 5	Twins	3–4	Burnett (1–1)	**Ziegler** (2–3)	Rauch (15)	16,421	29–28	
58	June 6	Twins	5–4	**Gonzalez** (6–3)	Blackburn (6–3)	**Wuertz** (1)	20,059	30–28	
59	June 7	Angels	2–4	Kazmir (5–5)	**Sheets** (2–5)	Fuentes (8)	10,071	30–29	
60	June 8	Angels	10–1	**Mazzaro** (2–0)	Weaver (5–3)		11,860	31–29	
61	June 9	Angels	1–7	Saunders (5–6)	**Braden** (4–6)		18,285	31–30	
62	June 10	Angels	6–1	**Cahill** (5–2)	Santana (6–4)		12,328	32–30	
63	June 11	@ Giants	2–6	Lincecum (6–2)	**Gonzalez** (6–4)	Wilson (16)	41,817	32–31	
64	June 12	@ Giants	4–5	Zito (7–2)	**Sheets** (2–6)	Wilson (17)	36,861	32–32	
65	June 13	@ Giants	2–6	Cain (6–4)	**Mazzaro** (2–1)	Casilla (2)	39,187	32–33	
66	June 15	@ Cubs	9–5	**Cahill** (6–2)	Zambrano (2–5)		34,390	33–33	
67	June 16	@ Cubs	2–6	Dempster (5–5)	**Gonzalez** (6–5)		36,244	33–34	
68	June 17	@ Cubs	2–3	Mármol (2–1)	**Blevins** (2–1)		36,942	33–35	
69	June 18	@ Cardinals	4–6	Carpenter (8–1)	**Ziegler** (2–4)	Franklin (13)	40,083	33–36	
70	June 19	@ Cardinals	3–4	Wainwright (10–4)	**Sheets** (2–7)	Motte (2)	43,682	33–37	
71	June 20	@ Cardinals	3–2	**Breslow** (2–1)	Hawksworth (1–4)	**Bailey** (13)	42,271	34–37	
72	June 21	Reds	4–6	Cordero (3–3)	**Wuertz** (2–1)	Smith (1)	11,088	34–38	
73	June 22	Reds	2–4	Arroyo (7–3)	**Braden** (4–7)	Cordero (18)	12,136	34–39	
74	June 23	Reds	0–3	Cueto (7–2)	**Mazzaro** (2–2)	Cordero (19)	20,824	34–40	
75	June 25	Pirates	14–4	**Sheets** (3–7)	Lincoln (0–2)		11,154	35–40	
76	June 26	Pirates	5–0	**Cahill** (7–2)	McCutchen (0–3)		25,068	36–40	
77	June 27	Pirates	3–2	**Breslow** (3–1)	Meek (3–2)	**Bailey** (14)	15,238	37–40	
78	June 29	@ Orioles	4–2	**Mazzaro** (3–2)	Matusz (2–9)	**Bailey** (15)	11,987	38–40	
79	June 30	@ Orioles	6–9	Albers (3–3)	**Bowers** (0–1)	Simón (10)	21,392	38–41	

July (14–9)

#	Date	Opponent	Score	Win	Loss	Save	Attendance	Record	Boxscore
80	July 1	@ Orioles	8–1	**Cahill** (8–2)	Arrieta (2–2)		15,712	39–41	
81	July 2	@ Indians	3–0	**Gonzalez** (7–5)	Talbot (8–7)	**Bailey** (16)	18,629	40–41	
82	July 3	@ Indians	4–5 (10)	Sipp (1–2)	**Breslow** (3–2)		25,483	40–42	
83	July 4	@ Indians	3–1	**Mazzaro** (4–2)	Carmona (7–7)	**Bailey** (17)	13,940	41–42	
84	July 5	Yankees	1–3	Vázquez (7–7)	**Sheets** (3–8)	Rivera (19)	27,405	41–43	
85	July 6	Yankees	1–6	Sabathia (11–3)	**Cahill** (8–3)		20,473	41–44	
86	July 7	Yankees	2–6	Burnett (7–7)	**Gonzalez** (7–6)		31,518	41–45	
87	July 9	Angels	5–6	Jepsen (1–1)	**Bailey** (0–3)	Fuentes (16)	13,156	41–46	
88	July 10	Angels	15–1	**Sheets** (4–8)	Kazmir (7–9)		30,035	42–46	
89	July 11	Angels	5–2	**Cahill** (9–3)	Weaver (8–5)	**Bailey** (18)	15,164	43–46	
90	July 16	@ Royals	5–1	**Gonzalez** (8–6)	Greinke (5–9)		37,312	44–46	
91	July 17	@ Royals	6–5	**Breslow** (4–2)	Soria (0–2)	**Bailey** (19)	26,634	45–46	
92	July 18	@ Royals	9–6	**Mazzaro** (5–2)	Bannister (7–8)	**Bailey** (20)	18,702	46–46	
93	July 19	Red Sox	1–2	Matzusaka (7–3)	**Sheets** (4–9)	Papelbon (21)	19,341	46–47	
94	July 20	Red Sox	5–4 (10)	**Bailey** (1–3)	Ramírez (0–3)		20,271	47–47	
95	July 21	Red Sox	6–4	**Gonzalez** (9–6)	Buchholz (10–5)	**Wuertz (2)**	30,456	48–47	
96	July 23	White Sox	1–5	Buehrle (9–8)	**Cahill** (9–4)		15,103	48–48	
97	July 24	White Sox	10–2	**Mazzaro** (6–2)	García (9–4)		17,439	49–48	
98	July 25	White Sox	6–4	**Braden** (5–7)	Hudson (1–1)	**Wuertz** (3)	17,148	50–48	
99	July 27	@ Rangers	1–3	Feliz (2–2)	**Wuertz** (2–2)		28,124	50–49	
100	July 28	@ Rangers	1–3	**Cahill** (10–4)	Lewis (9–7)	**Breslow** (1)	38,269	51–49	
101	July 29	@ Rangers	4–7	Wilson (10–5)	**Mazzaro** (6–3)		28.739	51–50	
102	July 30	@ White Sox	1–6	Harrell (1–0)	**Anderson** (2–2)		29,431	51–51	
103	July 31	@ White Sox	6–2	**Braden** (6–7)	Danks (11–8)		35,852	52–51	

August (13–15)

#	Date	Opponent	Score	Win	Loss	Save	Attendance	Record	Boxscore
104	August 1	@ White Sox	1–4	Floyd (7–8)	**Gonzalez** (9–7)	Jenks (22)	32,118	52–52	
105	August 2	Royals	6–0	**Cahill** (11–4)	Bannister (7–11)		10,047	53–52	
106	August 3	Royals	2–3	Chavez (4–2)	**Breslow** (4–3)	Soria (30)	10,670	53–53	
107	August 4	Royals	4–3	**Anderson** (3–2)	O'Sullivan (1–2)	**Wuertz** (4)	22,325	54–53	
108	August 6	Rangers	1–5	Lee (10–5)	**Braden** (6–8)		26,388	54–54	
109	August 7	Rangers	6–2	**Gonzalez** (10–7)	Harden (4–4)		16,104	55–54	
110	August 8	Rangers	3–2	**Cahill** (12–4)	Oliver (0–1)	**Wuertz** (5)	18,050	56–54	
111	August 9	@ Mariners	1–5	Fister (4–8)	**Mazzaro** (6–4)	Aardsma (21)	19,943	56–55	
112	August 10	@ Mariners	0–2	Hernández (8–9)	**Anderson** (3–3)	Aardsma (22)	21,377	56–56	
113	August 11	@ Mariners	5–1	**Braden** (7–8)	French (1–3)		31,560	57–56	
114	August 13	@ Twins	3–4	Pavano (15–7)	**Gonzalez** (10–8)	Capps (29)	40,622	57–57	
115	August 14	@ Twins	0–2	Duensing (6–1)	**Cahill** (12–5)		40,830	57–58	
116	August 15	@ Twins	2–4	Slowey (11–5)	**Mazzaro** (6–5)	Capps (30)	40,602	57–59	
117	August 16	Blue Jays	1–3	Marcum (11–6)	**Anderson** (3–4)		10,136	57–60	
118	August 17	Blue Jays	6–2	**Braden** (8–8)	Tallet (2–5)	**Wuertz** (6)	13,237	58–60	
119	August 18	Blue Jays	5–4	**Ziegler** (3–4)	Janssen (4–1)		18,046	59–60	
120	August 19	Rays	4–3	**Cahill** (13–5)	Wheeler (2–1)	**Blevins** (1)	10,118	60–60	
121	August 20	Rays	5–4	**Rodríguez** (1–0)	Benoit (0–2)	**Breslow** (2)	13,207	61–60	
122	August 21	Rays	4–5	Choate (3–3)	**Breslow** (4–4)	Soriano (36)	16,202	61–61	
123	August 22	Rays	2–3	Garza (13–7)	**Braden** (8–9)	Soriano (37)	18,749	61–62	
124	August 24	@ Indians	5–0	**Gonzalez** (11–8)	Carmona (11–12)		11,751	62–62	
125	August 25	@ Indians	6–1	**Cahill** (14–5)	Talbot (8–11)		10,514	63–62	
126	August 26	@ Indians	2–3	Masterson (5–12)	**Mazzaro** (6–6)	Perez (16)	11,826	63–63	
127	August 27	@ Rangers	3–7	Hunter (11–2)	**Anderson** (3–5)		24,962	63–64	
128	August 28	@ Rangers	5–0	**Braden** (9–9)	Harden (5–5)		47,411	64–64	
129	August 29	@ Rangers	8–2	**Gonzalez** (12–8)	Lewis (9–11)		37,188	65–64	
130	August 30	@ Yankees	5–11	Vázquez (10–9)	**Cahill** (14–6)		46,356	65–65	
131	August 31	@ Yankees	3–9	Hughes (16–6)	**Mazzaro** (6–7)		44,575	65–66	

September (13–15) / October (3–0)

#	Date	Opponent	Score	Win	Loss	Save	Attendance	Record	Boxscore
132	September 1	@ Yankees	3–4	Burnett (10–12)	**Anderson** (3–6)	Rivera (28)	45,222	65–67	
133	September 2	@ Yankees	0–5	Sabathia (19–5)	**Braden** (9–10)		44,644	65–68	
134	September 3	Angels	8–0	**Gonzalez** (13–8)	Kazmir (8–13)		23,401	66–68	
135	September 4	Angels	3–1	**Cahill** (15–6)	Weaver (11–11)	**Bailey** (21)	14,227	67–68	
136	September 5	Angels	4–7	Santana (15–9)	**Mazzaro** (6–8)		16,413	67–69	
137	September 6	Mariners	6–2	**Anderson** (4–6)	Vargas (9–9)		11,581	68–69	
138	September 7	Mariners	5–7	Fister (5–11)	**Braden** (9–11)	Aardsma (29)	10,067	68–70	
139	September 8	Mariners	4–3	**Gonzalez** (14–8)	French (4–5)	**Bailey** (22)	15,180	69–70	
140	September 10	Red Sox	5–0	**Cahill** (16–6)	Buchhloz (15–7)		19,139	70–70	
141	September 11	Red Sox	4–3	**Anderson** (5–6)	Lackey (12–10)	**Bailey** (23)	22,932	71–70	
142	September 12	Red Sox	3–5	Beckett (5–4)	**Braden** (9–12)	Papelbon (36)	19,806	71–71	
143	September 13	@ Royals	3–1	**Cramer** (1–0)	Hochevar (5–5)	**Bailey** (24)	20,695	72–71	
144	September 14	@ Royals	3–11	Greinke (9–12)	**Gonzalez** (14–9)		12,852	72–72	
145	September 15	@ Royals	3–6	Chen (10–7)	**Cahill** (16–7)	Soria (38)	11,087	72–73	
146	September 17	@ Twins	3–1	**Anderson** (6–6)	Blackburn (9–10)	**Bailey** (25)	40,681	73–73	
147	September 18	@ Twins	2–4	Slowey (13–6)	**Braden** (9–13)	Capps (40)	40,847	73–74	
148	September 19	@ Twins	6–2	**Cramer** (2–0)	Liriano (14–8)		40,088	74–74	
149	September 20	White Sox	3–0	**Bonser** (1–0)	Linebrink (3–2)	**Breslow** (3)	10,090	75–74	
150	September 21	White Sox	7–2	**Cahill** (17–7)	Buehrle (12–12)		11,158	76–74	
151	September 22	White Sox	3–4	Thornton (4–4)	**Zielger** (3–5)	Sale (3)	16,056	76–75	
152	September 23	Rangers	5–0	**Braden** (10–13)	Lee (12–9)		10,815	77–75	
153	September 24	Rangers	3–10	Hunter (13–4)	**Cramer** (2–1)		15,539	77–76	
154	September 25	Rangers	3–4	O'Day (5–2)	**Wuertz** (2–3)	Feliz (38)	20,136	77–77	
155	September 26	Rangers	9–16	Lewis (12–13)	**Cahill** (17–8)		21,030	77–78	
156	September 27	@ Angels	5–6	Kohn (2–0)	**Ziegler** (3–6)	Rodney (13)	40,414	77–79	
157	September 28	@ Angels	2–4	Haren (11–12)	**Braden** (10–14)	Rodney (14)	43,163	77–80	
158	September 29	@ Angels	1–2	Cassevah (1–2)	**Ziegler** (3–7)		39,199	77–81	
159	September 30	@ Mariners	8–1	**Gonzalez** (15–9)	Fister (6–14)		16,940	78–81	
160	October 1	@ Mariners	9–0	**Cahill** (18–8)	French (5–7)		19,656	79–81	
161	October 2	@ Mariners	5–3	**Anderson** (7–6)	Pauley (4–9)	**Breslow** (4)	17,717	80–81	
162	October 3	@ Mariners	4–3	**Braden** (11–14)	Varvaro (0–1)	**Breslow** (5)	23,263	81–81	

=== Dallas Braden's perfect game ===
On Mother's Day, Braden pitches the 19th perfect game in major league history against the MLB's best team, the Tampa Bay Rays, who for the second time in less than a year were on the wrong side. The Rays less than two weeks before had hit Braden up for four runs on eight hits over just four innings. May 9 was the second perfect game in the Athletics' Oakland tenure, coming 42 years and 1 day after Catfish Hunter's game and first no-hitter by an Athletics pitcher since Dave Stewart's on June 29, 1990. Braden's batterymate was Landon Powell, who was drafted the same year as Braden and had caught him in all levels of pro ball. In the top of fifth, Evan Longoria broke an unwritten rule by attempting to break up the perfect game with a bunt, but rolled foul and ended up striking out. All 12,228 fans weren't too thrilled to see Tampa's best hitter try to lay down a bunt, as Manager Joe Maddon said, "to get things going." Powell said that he started getting nervous around the sixth inning and was more excited about going back to behind the plate than hitting. He finished throwing 109 pitches with six strikeouts, which is tied for third fewest.

=== Month review ===
==== September/October ====
On September 1, Rajai Davis stole his 40th base for the season, becoming the fourth Athletic to have 2 seasons with +40 SB (Henderson, Campaneris, North). Also, Barton walks twice and is the first player in franchise history to have five consecutive multi-walk games. September 6, Pennington steals 23rd base, most for an Athletic infielder since Carney Lansford in 1989 and Crisp hits team's first leadoff home run of the season. September 8, team has 2 double-steals in one inning, first time since July 17, 1983. September 10, Crisp steals 3 bases in one game. September 9 and 10, team steals 4 bases in consecutive games for first time since July 30 and 31, 1993. September 13, Cust hits 100th career HR and 30-year-old Bobby Cramer earns first career win throwing 5.1 innings (1 ER, 4 H, 4 K), becoming the oldest starting pitcher in franchise history to earn a win in first major league game. September 14, Sogard gets first career hit in eight inning. September 21, Carter gets first career hit in sixth inning, snapping 0–33 streak. September 23, Braden and Ziegler threw a combined one-hitter, fourth time in Oakland's history the team has throw a no-hitter and one-hitter in same season. September 26, Tolleson hits first career home run. September 27, Ellis hits career 191st double, tying Miguel Tejada for 10th on Oakland's all-time list. September 28, Braden records career-high eighth pickoff of the season (previous high seven in 2008, 17th of his career).

The team stole 156 bases, the most for Oakland since 1989.

==== August ====
July 31 – August 2, Braden (W)-Gonzalez (L)-Cahill (W) toss 3 straight complete games. First time since September 8–10, 2000 (Heredia–Hudson–Zito). August 7, Davis steal 2 bases, giving him 100 as an Athletic, 10th player to do so in franchise history. August 9, Team's number a prospect, Chris Carter, makes MLB debut. August 11, Braden throws fourth complete game of the season, most since Mark Mulder threw five in 2004. August 18–20, Pennington drives in 3 consecutive GW runs. August 19, Cahill ties Nolan Ryan's record of 20 consecutive games with 6 or fewer hits allowed and Blevins records first career save. August 20, Crisp and Pennington double steal, giving them each 20 SBs on the season. First time since 1992 (Henderson–Wilson–Blankenship), the A's have 3 players with +20 SBs. Through August 20, Team has AL-best 3.53 ERA (5th in MLB). August 22, team promotion Fiesta Day, team wore 'Atléticos' jerseys. Ending August 27, team set franchise record of 18 consecutive games with 6 IP and 3 of less ER by starting pitchers. Also, 24 consecutive games allowing 5 runs or fewer, second longest AL streak in DH era since 1974 (1980 Royals with 25). Finished month as the only AL team to have three pitchers in top 10 ERA: Cahill (3rd), Gonzalez (9th), Braden (10th).

==== July ====
July 2, with bases loaded and 2 outs, team records a 9–3 putout. Sweeney throws out Cleveland's Mike Redmond before reaching first for sixth time since 1950. Team shutouts Cleveland 3–0. July 10–18, season-high 5-game winning streak. July 19, Sweeney out for season. Kouzmanoff hits walk-off single in bottom 10th on July 20, beating Boston 5–4.

==== June ====
Bad month for the team, going 10–17. June 25–27, completed third sweep of season against Pittsburgh. Former Athletic Bobby Crosby makes first return to Oakland. June 30, Ellis steals home against Baltimore (First since 2008), but then ruling is changed to fielder's choice. Team is appealing the call.

==== May ====
May 1, Donaldson gets first career hit, 2-run HR. May 4, Sweeney knocks in career-high 5 RBIs. May 12–16, 5-game losing streak, scoring total of 5 runs. Last time that happen was September 1979. May 18, Suzuki hits walk-off single to right against Seattle (3rd time in season) in bottom 12. Completed first sweep of season (2-game series). May 21, Former Athletics Barry Zito now 0–4 with 8.85 ERA against team. May 21–23, completed second sweep of season against San Francisco, outscoring the cross bay rivals 10–1.

==== April ====
Team lost season opener. April 6, Ellis hit a walk-off single to right against Seattle in bottom of the 10th. The next night, Suzuki hit a walk-off single to left against Seattle in bottom of the 9th. Ross made MLB debut (2.1 IP). April 12, team records first shutout, defeating Seattle 4–0. Duchscherer gets first win since July 8, 2008. April 17, Sweeney hits walk off 2-run single to right against Baltimore. June 22, team hits into first triple-play since May 14, 1994, against New York. Team wore green jerseys at home for first time in 3 seasons. June 30, Donaldson makes MLB debut (0–1, 1 K).

=== Record vs. opponents ===
2010 American League record Source: MLB Standings Grid – 2010
Team	BAL	BOS	CWS	CLE	DET	KC	LAA	MIN	NYY	OAK	SEA	TB	TEX	TOR	NL
Baltimore	–	9–9	4–3	3–3	5–5	2–4	6–0	3–5	5–13	3–7	3–6	7–11	6–4	3–15	7–11
Boston	9–9	–	1–6	4–4	3–3	4–3	9–1	3–2	9–9	4–5	7–3	7–11	4–6	12–6	13–5
Chicago	3–4	6–1	–	9–9	8–10	10–8	7–2	5–13	2–4	4–5	9–1	3–4	4–5	3–5	15–3
Cleveland	3–3	4–4	9–9	–	9–9	10–8	5–4	6–12	2–6	3–6	3–4	2–7	2–4	6–4	5–13
Detroit	5–5	3–3	10–8	9–9	–	10–8	6–4	9–9	4–4	3–3	3–5	1–6	3–6	4–4	11–7
Kansas City	4–2	3-4	9–10	8–10	8–10	–	3-7	5–13	3–5	3–6	5–4	4–4	2–7	3–3	8–10
Los Angeles	0–6	1–9	2–7	4–5	4–6	7–3	–	2–5	4–4	11–8	15–4	4–5	9–10	6–3	11–7
Minnesota	5–3	2–3	13–5	12–6	9–9	13–5	5–2	–	2–4	6–3	6-4	3–5	7–3	3–6	8–10
New York	13–5	9–9	4–2	6-2	4–4	5–3	4–4	4–2	–	9–1	6–4	8–10	4–4	8–10	11–7
Oakland	7–3	5–4	5–4	6–3	3–3	6–3	8–11	3–6	1–9	–	13–6	4–5	9–10	3–4	8–10
Seattle	6–3	3–7	1–9	4–3	5–3	4–5	4–15	4–6	4–6	6–13	–	2–7	7–12	2–3	9–9
Tampa Bay	11–7	11–7	4–3	7–2	6–1	4–4	5–4	5–3	10–8	5–4	7–2	–	4–2	10–8	7–11
Texas	4–6	6–4	5–4	4–2	6–3	7–2	10-9	3-7	4-4	10-9	12–7	2–4	–	3–7	14–4
Toronto	15–3	6–12	5–3	4–6	4–4	3–3	3–6	6–3	10–8	4–3	3–2	8–10	7–3	–	7–11

- Source: MLB Standings Grid – 2010

=== Team leaders/team rank ===
As of 10/3/10

Stat	Player (Total)	Team (MLB Rank)
Runs	Barton (79)	663 (23)
Hits	Barton (152)	1396 (18)
Doubles	Barton (33)	276 (17)
Triples	Pennington (8)	30 (t-13)
Home Runs	Kouzmanoff (16)	109 (28)
RBIs	Kouzmanoff/Suzuki (71)	619 (25)
Stolen Bases	Davis (50)	156 (3)
Batting Avg.	Davis (.284)	.256 (17)
Wins	Cahill (18)	72 (15)
ERA	Cahill (2.97)	3.56 (4)
Innings Pitched	Gonzalez (200.2)	1431.2 (29)
Strikeouts	Gonzalez (171)	1070 (21)

- Barton lead AL in walks with 110 (2nd in MLB) and 1B FPct. with .993 (5th in MLB).
- Team ERA lead AL by 0.22. Rotation's 3.47 ERA lead MLB.

== Roster ==
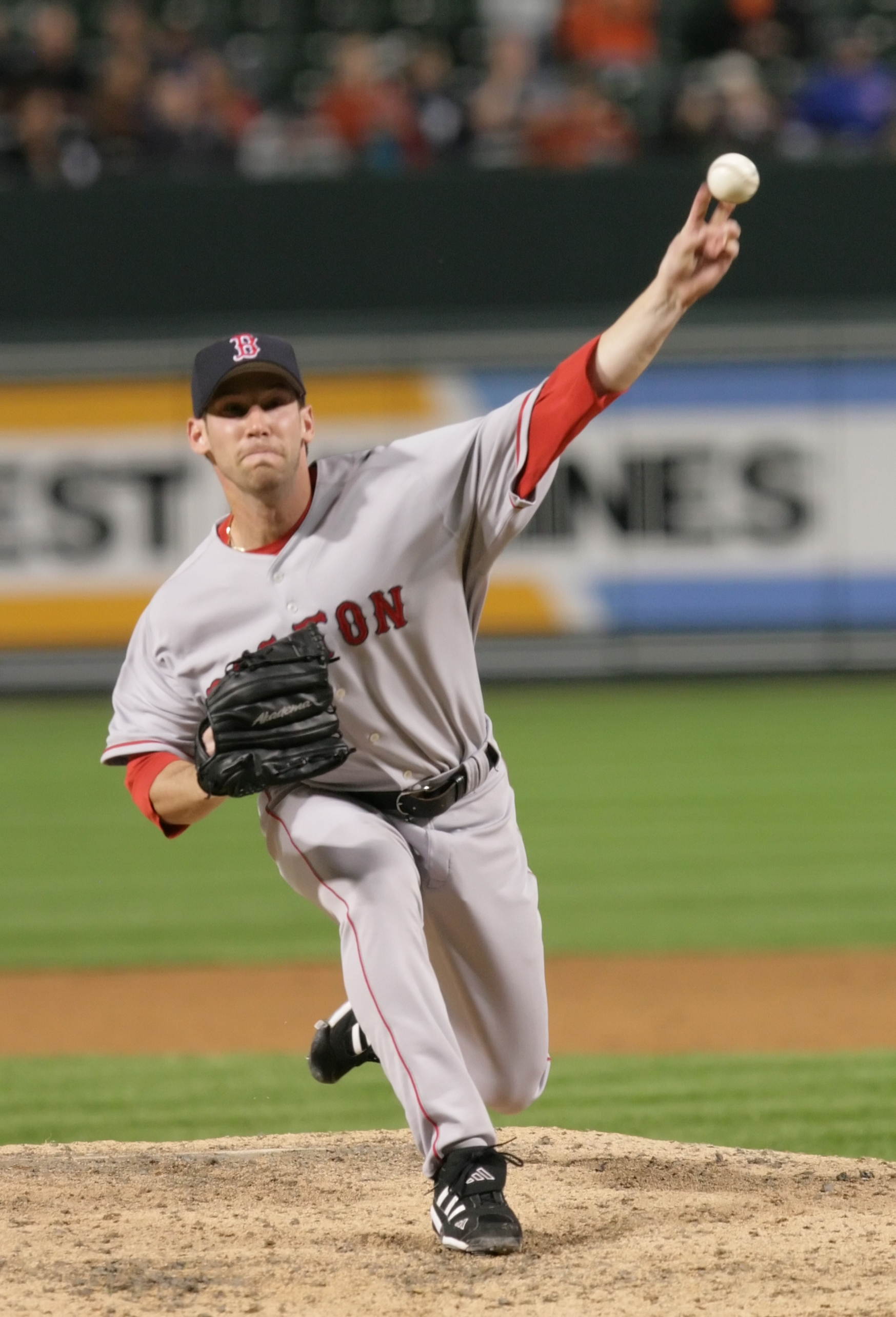
Craig Breslow

2010 Oakland Athletics
Roster
Pitchers: 49 Brett Anderson; 40 Andrew Bailey; 13 Jerry Blevins; 52 Boof Bonser; 57 Cedrick Bowers; 51 Dallas Braden; 56 Craig Breslow; 53 Trevor Cahill; 64 Bobby Cramer; 58 Justin Duchscherer; 57 Chad Gaudin; 47 Gio González; 61 Justin James; 39 Brad Kilby; 54 Vin Mazzaro; 62 Clay Mortensen; 59 Edwar Ramírez; 63 Henry Rodríguez; 66 Tyson Ross; 15 Ben Sheets; 50 Ross Wolf; 48 Michael Wuertz; 31 Brad Ziegler	Catchers: 29 Josh Donaldson; 35 Landon Powell; 8 Kurt Suzuki; Infielders: 10 Daric Barton; 3 Eric Chavez; 14 Mark Ellis; 50 Jake Fox; 1 Akinori Iwamura; 5 Kevin Kouzmanoff; 19 Jeff Larish; 26 Cliff Pennington; 7 Adam Rosales; 36 Eric Sogard; 30 Steve Tolleson; Outfielders: 6 Travis Buck; 25 Matt Carson; 22 Chris Carter; 4 Coco Crisp; 32 Jack Cust; 11 Rajai Davis; 18 Gabe Gross; 45 Jeremy Hermida; 28 Conor Jackson; 1 Eric Patterson; 21 Ryan Sweeney; 26 Matt Watson	Manager: 17 Bob Geren; Coaches: 12 Mike Gallego (third base); 37 Ron Romanick (bullpen); 20 Jim Skaalen (hitting); 38 Todd Steverson (first base); 46 Tye Waller (bench); 41 Curt Young (pitching)

== Player stats ==
=== Batting ===
Note: G = Games played; AB = At bats; R = Runs; H = Hits; 2B = Doubles; 3B = Triples; HR = Home runs; RBI = Runs batted in; SB = Stolen bases; BB = Walks; AVG = Batting average; SLG = Slugging average

Player	G	AB	R	H	2B	3B	HR	RBI	SB	BB	AVG	SLG
Daric Barton	159	556	79	152	33	5	10	57	7	110	.273	.405
Kevin Kouzmanoff	143	551	59	136	32	1	16	71	2	24	.247	.396
Rajai Davis	143	525	66	149	28	3	5	52	50	26	.284	.377
Cliff Pennington	156	508	64	127	26	8	6	46	29	50	.250	.368
Kurt Suzuki	131	495	55	120	18	2	13	71	3	33	.242	.366
Mark Ellis	124	436	45	127	24	0	5	49	7	40	.291	.381
Jack Cust	112	349	50	95	19	0	13	52	2	68	.272	.438
Ryan Sweeney	82	303	41	89	20	2	1	36	1	24	.294	.383
Coco Crisp	75	290	51	81	14	4	8	38	32	30	.279	.438
Adam Rosales	80	255	31	69	8	2	7	31	2	19	.271	.400
Gabe Gross	105	222	27	53	11	1	1	25	5	17	.239	.311
Landon Powell	41	112	13	24	4	0	2	11	1	15	.214	.304
Eric Chavez	33	111	10	26	8	0	1	10	0	8	.234	.333
Eric Patterson	45	103	13	21	5	2	4	9	6	7	.204	.408
Jake Fox	39	98	11	21	5	0	2	12	0	5	.214	.327
Matt Carson	36	79	7	14	2	0	4	9	4	2	.177	.354
Chris Carter	24	70	8	13	1	0	3	7	1	7	.186	.329
Jeremy Hermida	21	64	5	16	4	0	1	2	0	4	.250	.359
Conor Jackson	18	57	6	13	2	0	1	5	2	11	.228	.316
Jeff Larish	24	57	5	10	3	0	2	8	1	7	.175	.333
Steven Tolleson	25	49	5	14	3	0	1	4	0	4	.286	.408
Travis Buck	14	42	6	7	2	0	1	2	1	4	.167	.286
Josh Donaldson	14	32	1	5	1	0	1	4	0	2	.156	.281
Akinori Iwamura	10	31	3	4	1	0	0	4	0	5	.129	.161
Matt Watson	12	30	2	6	2	0	1	4	0	3	.200	.367
Eric Sogard	4	7	0	3	0	0	0	0	0	2	.429	.429
Pitcher totals	162	16	0	1	0	0	0	0	0	0	.063	.063
Team totals	162	5448	663	1396	276	30	109	619	156	527	.256	.378

=== Pitching ===
Note: W = Wins; L = Losses; ERA = Earned run average; G = Games pitched; GS = Games started; SV = Saves; IP = Innings pitched; H = Hits allowed; R = Runs allowed; ER = Earned runs allowed; BB = Walks allowed; SO = Strikeouts

Player	W	L	ERA	G	GS	SV	IP	H	R	ER	BB	SO
Gio González	15	9	3.23	33	33	0	200.2	171	75	72	92	171
Trevor Cahill	18	8	2.97	30	30	0	196.2	155	73	65	63	118
Dallas Braden	11	14	3.50	30	30	0	192.2	180	83	75	43	113
Vin Mazzaro	6	8	4.27	24	18	0	122.1	127	70	58	50	79
Ben Sheets	4	9	4.53	20	20	0	119.1	123	65	60	43	84
Brett Anderson	7	6	2.80	19	19	0	112.1	112	41	35	22	75
Craig Breslow	4	4	3.01	75	0	5	74.2	53	26	25	29	71
Brad Ziegler	3	7	3.26	64	0	0	60.2	54	24	22	28	41
Andrew Bailey	1	3	1.47	47	0	25	49.0	34	8	8	13	42
Jerry Blevins	2	1	3.70	63	0	1	48.2	54	20	20	18	46
Michael Wuertz	2	3	4.31	48	0	6	39.2	35	21	19	21	40
Tyson Ross	1	4	5.49	26	2	1	39.1	39	24	24	20	32
Justin Duchscherer	2	1	2.89	5	5	0	28.0	26	11	9	12	18
Henry Rodríguez	1	0	4.55	29	0	0	27.2	25	16	14	13	33
Bobby Cramer	2	1	3.04	4	4	0	23.2	20	8	8	6	13
Boof Bonser	1	0	5.09	13	0	0	23.0	27	13	13	6	17
Chad Gaudin	0	2	8.83	12	0	0	17.1	27	18	17	5	20
Cedrick Bowers	0	1	4.50	14	0	0	14.0	12	9	7	6	18
Ross Wolf	0	0	4.26	11	0	0	12.2	12	6	6	6	9
Edwar Ramírez	1	0	4.91	7	0	0	11.0	9	7	6	10	10
Brad Kilby	0	0	2.16	5	0	0	8.1	7	2	2	0	8
Clay Mortensen	0	0	4.50	1	1	0	6.0	6	4	3	2	7
Justin James	0	0	4.50	5	0	0	4.0	7	2	2	4	5
Team totals	81	81	3.56	162	162	38	1431.2	1315	626	566	512	1070

=== Awards ===
ALL STAR GAME

- Trevor Cahill, 1st selection – Did not pitch
- Andrew Bailey, 2nd selection – 0.1 IP, 1 K, 1 BB

PLAYER OF THE WEEK

- Dallas Braden (Perfect game on Mother's Day), May 3 – 9
- Trevor Cahill (2–0, 0.00 ERA, 17 IP), August 2 – 8

=== Opening Day lineup ===
Player	Position	Stats
Ben Sheets	Pitcher	5 IP, 4 H, 3 R (2 ER), 3 K, 4 BB, 3.60 ERA, 1 Pickoff, ND
Kurt Suzuki	Catcher	0–3, 2 E
Daric Barton	First Base	0–1, 3 BB, 1 E
Mark Ellis	Second Base	0–2, 2 BB, 1 R, 1 K
Kevin Kouzmanoff	Third Base	0–4, 1 E
Cliff Pennington	Shortstop	2–3, 1 RBI, 1 K
Travis Buck	Left Field	0–3, 1 BB, 1 R, 2 K
Rajai Davis	Center Field	2–4, 1 R, 1 RBI, 1 SB, 1 K
Ryan Sweeney	Right Field	1–4, 1 RBI
Eric Chavez	Designated Hitter	0–4, 1 K

=== Transactions ===
Non-injury report

- 09/13/10 – Recalled P Vin Mazzaro (3), C Josh Donaldson (2), 1B/OF Chris Carter (2). Selected contract and recalled IF Eric Sogard (1). DFA'd P Jeff Lyman (released 9/14).
- 09/12/10 – Signed IF Aki Iwamura to a major league contract and transferred OF Conor Jackson to 60-Day DL.
- 09/10/10 – Selected contract and recalled P Bobby Cramer (1), transferred IF Adam Rosales to 60-Day DL.
- 09/07/10 – Selected contract and recalled OF Jeremy Hermida (1).
- 09/06/10 – Optioned P Vin Mazzaro.
- 09/03/10 – Signed OF Jeremy Hermida to a minor-league contract and assigned to AAA.
- 09/01/10 – Outrighted P Cedrick Bowers to AAA and selected contract and recalled P Justin James (1). Recalled P Ross Wolf (2).
- 08/31/10 – Signed IF Tommy Everidge to minor-league contract and assigned to AAA. Appeared in 24 games for the Athletics in 2009.
- 08/26/10 – Outrighted OF Matt Watson to AAA.
- 08/24/10 – Optioned OF Travis Buck and recalled OF Matt Carson (4).
- 08/22/10 – Optioned P Ross Wolf.
- 08/20/10 – Recalled 1B Jeff Larish (2).
- 08/16/10 – Optioned 1B/OF Chris Carter and 1B Jeff Larish and recalled OF Travis Buck (1).
- 08/13/10 – Recalled IF Steven Tolleson (2).
- 08/09/10 – Optioned OF Matt Carson and recalled 1B/OF Chris Carter (1) and 1B Jeff Larish (1).
- 08/03/10 – Claimed 1B Jeff Larish off waivers from DET and optioned to AAA. DFA'd 3B Adam Heether (outrighted 08/05).
- 07/31/10 – Optioned P Cedrick Bowers and selected contract and recalled P Boof Bonser (1).
- 07/30/10 – Optioned OF Travis Buck to AAA.
- 07/24/10 – Recalled P Cedrick Bowers (3).
- 07/20/10 – Optioned P Cedrick Bowers.
- 07/19/10 – Recalled P Henry Rodriguez (4).
- 07/14/10 – Released P Jamey Wright.
- 07/07/10 – Optioned P Tyson Ross and selected contract and recalled up P Ross Wolf (1), transferred IF Eric Chavez to 60-Day DL.
- 07/05/10 – Optioned P Clayton Mortensen and recalled OF Matt Carson (3). Selected contract & recalled up OF Matt Watson (1).
- 07/02/10 – Signed P Boof Bonser to minor league contract. Claimed P Jeff Lyman off waivers from ATL and optioned to AA. Recalled P Clayton Mortensen (1).
- 06/27/10 – Traded UT Eric Patterson to BOS for minor-league P Fabian Williamson.
- 06/22/10 – DFA'd UT Eric Patterson. Traded UT Jake Fox to BAL for cash considerations and minor-league P Ross Wolf.
- 06/16/10 – Signed P Jamey Wright to minor league contract, assigned to AAA.
- 06/15/10 – Traded P Sam Demel (AAA) to ARI for cash considerations and LF/1B Conor Jackson and optioned OF Matt Carson.
- 06/13/10 – DFA'd UT Jake Fox and recalled C Landon Powell (3).
- 06/08/10 – Optioned P Henry Rodriguez and recalled OF Matt Carson (2).
- 06/04/10 – Optioned C Landon Powell and recalled Ps Cedrick Bowers (2) and Henry Rodriguez (3).
- 06/03/10 – Claimed 3B Adam Heether off waivers from MIL & optioned to AAA and transferred P Justin Duchscherer to 60-Day DL.
- 05/27/10 – Recalled C Landon Powell (2).
- 05/21/10 – Optioned C Landon Powell.
- 05/20/10 – Recalled P Vin Mazzaro (2) and optioned P Henry Rodriguez.
- 05/16/10 – Recalled P Henry Rodriguez (2). Optioned C Josh Donaldson. Selected contract and recalled up P Cedrick Bowers (1). DFA'd Chad Gaudin.
- 05/15/10 – Selected contract and recalled DH Jack Cust (1). Optioned P Henry Rodriguez and DFA'd P Edwar Ramírez.
- 05/07/10 – P Edwar Ramírez recalled (1).
- 05/05/10 – Optioned P Vin Mazzaro and recalled P Henry Rodríguez (1).
- 05/04/10 – Optioned IF Steven Tolleson and recalled P Vin Mazzaro (1).
- 05/03/10 – Activated P Michael Wuertz and optioned P Brad Kilby.
- 04/30/10 – Recalled P Trevor Cahill (1). Transferred P Joey Devine to 60-Day DL and selected contract and recalled up C Josh Donaldson (1).
- 04/27/10 – Optioned P Edwar Ramírez and recalled C Landon Powell (1) and IF Steven Tolleson (1).
- 04/26/10 – OF Jai Miller claimed off waivers by KC.
- 04/23/10 – Optioned C Landon Powell and recalled P Brad Kilby (1).
- 04/22/10 – DFA'd OF Jai Miller. Selected contract & recalled OF Matt Carson (1).
- 04/20/10 – Optioned P Trevor Cahill to AAA.
- 04/08/10 – Claimed OF Jai Miller off waivers from FLA, optioned to AAA.
- 04/03/10 – DH Jack Cust DFA'd, (04/07) outrighted to AAA. P Tyson Ross added to 40-man roster.
- 03/24/10 – Traded IF Gregorio Petit to TEX for P Edwar Ramírez.
- 03/15/10 – Rule 5 draftee, Bobby Cassevah, returned to LAA.
- 02/28/10 – Signed Ps Jason Jennings and Brett Tomko minor-league contracts. Jennings received major-league invite. Tomko still rehabbing.
- 02/09/10 – Release OF Willy Taveras.
- 02/06/10 – P Dana Eveland traded to TOR.
- 02/01/10 – Signed free agent OF Gabe Gross. Claimed IF Steven Tolleson off waivers from the MIN. Traded IF Aaron Miles to CIN for IF Adam Rosales and OF Willy Taveras. DFA'd Dana Eveland, Willy Taveras, Gregorio Petit (outrighted to AAA).
- 01/25/10 – Signed free agent RHP Ben Sheets to 1-year deal.
- 01/22/10 – OF Grant Desme retires.
- 01/15/10 – Traded OF Scott Hairston and OF Aaron Cunningham to SDP for 3B Kevin Kouzmanoff and IF Eric Sogard.
- 01/15/10 – IF Tommy Everidge claimed off waivers by SEA.
- 01/08/10 – P Jay Marshall claimed off waivers by NYM. MLB voided claim on 03/09 and returned to Oakland and released 03/10.

== Farm system ==
=== Non roster invitees ===
P Cedrick Bowers, P Sam Demel (traded to ARI), P Lenny DiNardo, P Fernando Hernández, P Marcus McBeth, P Tyson Ross, P Matt Wright, C Josh Donaldson, C Joel Galarraga, C Anthony Recker, C Max Stassi, IF Adrian Cardenas, IF Grant Green, IF Dallas McPherson, IF Gregorio Petit (traded to TEX), IF Eric Sogard, IF Jemile Weeks, IF Matthew Whitney, OF Corey Brown, OF Matt Carson, OF Michael Taylor, OF Corey Wimberly

Bold made appearance with Oakland.

=== Minor league standings ===
Level	Team	League	Manager	W	L	Position
AAA	Sacramento River Cats^{x}	Pacific Coast League	Tony DeFrancesco	79	65	1st in PCL Pacific South
AA	Midland RockHounds^{1 x}	Texas League	Darren Bush	35	35	1st in TEX South
High A	Stockton Ports^{2 x}	California League	Steve Scarsone	43	27	1st in CAL North
Low-A	Kane County Cougars^{3 x}	Midwest League	Aaron Nieckula	39	30	4 GB, 2nd in MID Western
SS-A	Vancouver Canadians^{4 x}	Northwest League	Rick Magnante	25	13	1st in NOR West
Rookie	AZL Athletics	Arizona League	Marcus Jensen	30	26	5 GB, 2nd in AZL East
Rookie	DSL Athletics	Dominican Summer League	Oscar Spencer	32	39	11 GB, 3rd in SD North

^{x} Made playoffs.

1. Midland RockHounds went 35–35 (3rd) in first half of the season. Won South Division Finals 3–1. Lost in Texas League Championship Series.
2. Stockton Ports went 31–39 (4th) in first half of the season. Lost in first-round of the playoffs.
3. Kane County Cougars went 32–37 (6th) in first half of the season. Lost in first-round of playoffs.
4. Vancouver Canadians went 17–21 (4th) in first half of the season. Lost in first-round of playoffs.

==== Affiliation news ====
Prior to the 2010 season, Oakland's farm system was ranked fifth in the league. For the first time since 2005, Oakland will have new minor league teams, for the 2011 season. 2010 will be the last season for Oakland's affiliation with Kane County (MWL) and Vancouver (NWL). Kane County, Oakland's Low-A team since 2003, signed on with Kansas City for the next two years. Vancouver, a Triple-A affiliate for the 1999 season and a Short-Season A team since 2000, signed on with Toronto for the next four seasons. Oakland signed two-year deals with the Midwest League's Burlington Bees (Athletics' affiliate from 1963 to 1974, MWL title in 1965) and New York–Penn League's Vermont Lake Monsters.

Oakland agreed to a four-year extension with Triple-A Sacramento through the 2014 season. Sacramento has been Oakland's Triple-A team since 2000.

=== Top prospects ===
#	Player	Position	Top 100 Rank	2010 Level(s) (Games)
1	Chris Carter	First Base	28	MLB (24) / AAA (125)
2	Michael Taylor	Outfield	29	AAA (127)
3	Grant Green	Shortstop	-	AA (Playoffs) / A-STK (131)
4	Max Stassi	Catcher	-	A-KC (110)
5	Pedro Figueroa	Pitcher	-	AA (13)
6	Tyson Ross	Pitcher	-	MLB (26) / AAA (6)
7	Jemile Weeks	Second Base	-	AA (67)
8	Grant Desme	Outfield	-	Retired
9	Adrian Cardenas	Infield	-	AAA (58) / AA (51)
10	Sean Doolittle	Outfield	-	Did not play

- Bold on 40-Man Roster to begin 2010 season.
- According to Baseball America

=== Organization leaders ===
Stat	Player	Team
AVG	Royce Consigli (.340)	AZL
Hits	Grant Green (174)	STK
Home Runs	Chris Carter (31)	SAC
RBIs	Stephen Parker (98)	STK
OPS	Connor Crumbliss (.421)	KC
SLG	Chris Carter (.529)	SAC
ERA	Ian Krol (2.80)	KC
Wins	Clayton Mortensen (13)	SAC
SO	Shawn Haviland (169)	STK
Saves	Paul Smyth (28)	STK
WHIP	Ian Krol (1.04)	KC
AVG	Ian Krol (.226)	KC

=== Awards ===
ALL STAR SELECTION
Pacific Coast League (AAA), July 14, 2010 @ Coca-Cola Park, Allentown, Pennsylvania
PCL vs. International League, 1–2

- Josh Donaldson – 0–1, 1 K
- Clayton Mortensen – 1.0 IP

Postseason All-Star Selection – Chris Carter

Texas League-South (AA), June 30, 2010 @ Citibank Ballpark, Midland, Texas
North vs. South, 4–5

- Jeff Bailey – Replaced Corpus Christi's Germán Durán, 0–1, 1K
- Travis Banwart – Promoted to AAA
- Corey Brown – 0–1, 1 K
- Archie Gilbert – 0–1, 1 R, 1 RBI, 1 BB, 1 K
- Carlos Hernández – 1.1 IP, 3 H, 1 ER, 2 K
- Josh Horton – 1–1
- Jared Lansford – Replaced Midland teammate Travis Banwart, 0.1 IP, 3 H
- Alex Valdez – 1–2, 1 R, 1 K
- Beau Vaughan – Promoted to AAA

Postseason All-Star Selection – Corey Brown, Josh Horton

California League (A), June 22, 2010 @ BB&T Coastal Field, Myrtle Beach, South Carolina
CAL vs. Carolina League, 4–3

- Stephen Parker – 1–2, GW RBI single in 9th

Postseason All-Star Selection – Grant Green, Shawn Haviland, Stephen Parker

Midwest League-West (A), June 22, 2010 @ Parkview Field, Fort Wayne, Indiana
West vs. East, 2–6

- Ian Krol – 0.2 IP, 4 H, 2 R, 1 K
- Connor Hoehn – 0.1 IP, 1 K
- Max Stassi – 1–2

ALL STAR FUTURES GAME July 11, 2010 @ Angel Stadium, Anaheim, California
U.S. vs. World, 9–1

- Grant Green, Stockton (A), U.S. Team – 1–2, 1 RBI

PLAYER OF THE WEEK
Sacramento River Cats

- Bobby Cramer, August 16 – 22
- Kyle Middleton, June 21 – 27

Midland RockHounds

- Archie Gilbert, April 26 – May 2

Stockton Ports

- Grant Green, August 16 – 22
- Shawn Haviland, July 26 – August 2, August 16 – 22
- Jermaine Mitchell, August 2 – 8
- Stephen Parker, April 26 – May 2

Vancouver Canadians

- A.J. Kirby-Jones, July 26 – August 2, August 30 – September 5
- Ryan Doolittle, June 28 – July 4
- Deyvi Jimenez, July 5 – 11
- Matthew Thomson, July 12 – 18, August 2 – 8, August 23 – 29
- Tony Thompson, July 5 – 11

=== Top 10 draft picks ===
Pick	Player	Position	School	Signed	Finishing Team
10	Michael Choice	OF	UT Arlington	07/30/10	Vancouver
60	Yordy Cabrera^{1}	3B	Lakeland Senior HS (FL)	08/16/10	AZL Athletics
92	Aaron Shipman	OF	Brooks County HS (GA)	08/16/10	AZL Athletics
125	Chad Lewis	3B	Marina HS (CA)	08/16/10	AZL Athletics
155	Tyler Vail	P	Notre Dame HS (PA)	06/15/10	AZL Athletics
185	Tony Thompson	3B	Kansas	06/11/10	Vancouver
215	Jordan Tripp	OF	Golden West College	06/20/10	AZL Athletics
245	Blake Hassebrock	P	UNC	06/23/10	Vancouver
275	A.J. Kirby-Jones	IF	Tenn. Tech	06/11/10	Vancouver
305	Joshua Bowman	P	Tampa	06/23/10	Vancouver

1. Cabrera appeared in the 2009 Under Armour All-America Game.

=== International signings ===
- Yadel Martí, RHP, Cuba
- Anderson Mata, LHP, Venezuela
- Renato Nunez, 3B, Venezuela
- Argenis Raga, C, Venezuela
- Jesus Rivas, IF/OF, Venezuela
- José Torres, LHP, Venezuela

=== Arizona Fall League ===
Seven player from the organization were assigned to the Phoenix Desert Dogs managed by Dodger's hitting coach Don Mattingly. The pitching coach will be the Athletics' roving pitching coach and rehab coordinator Garvin Alston.

- Travis Banwart, P
- Michael Benacka, P
- Grant Green, INF
- Carlos Hernández, P
- Justin James, P
- Stephen Parker, INF
- Lance Sewell, P
- Michael Taylor, OF
