= Daric Barton =

American baseball player (born 1985)

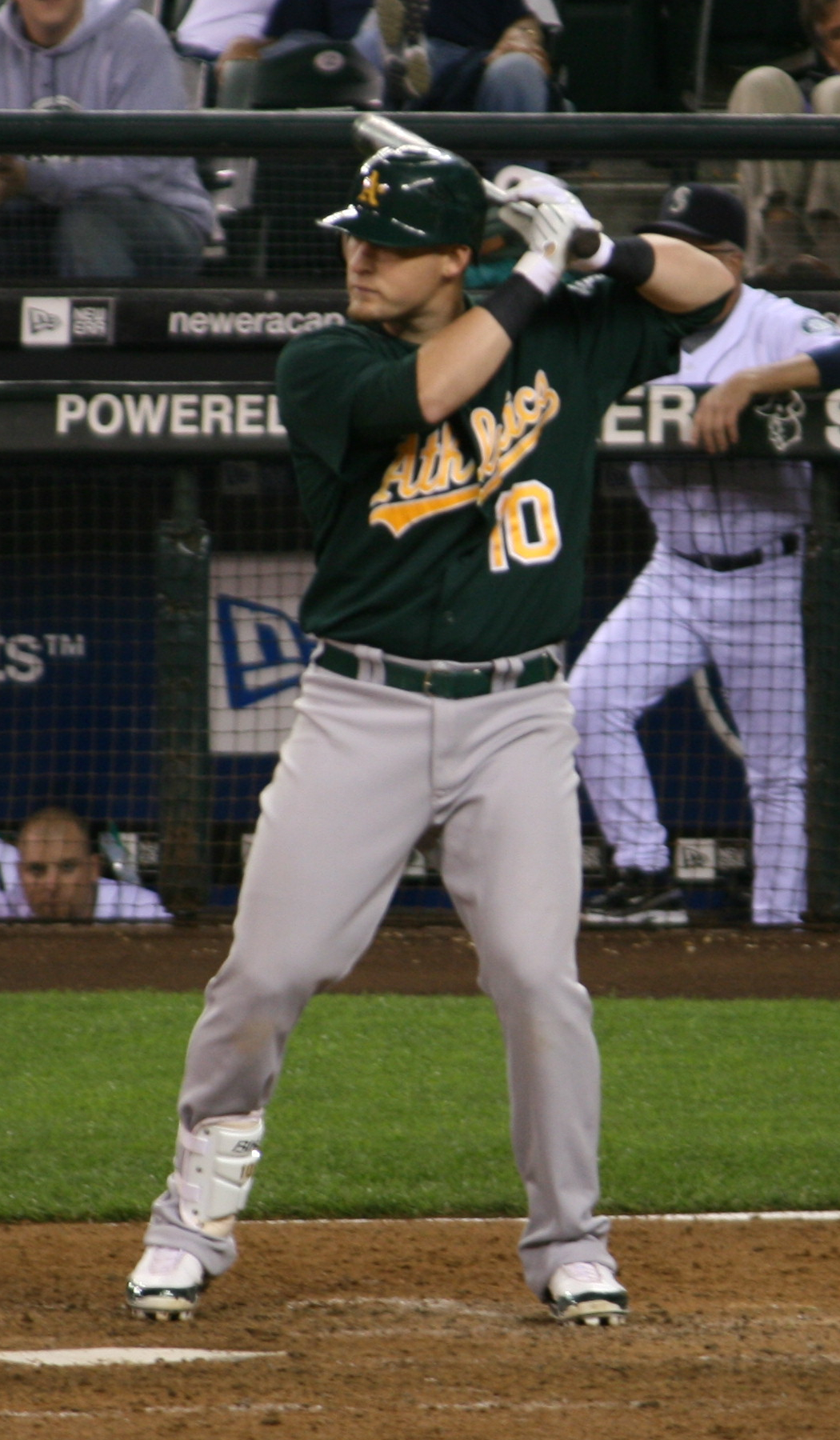
- Barton with the Oakland Athletics in 2008
- First baseman
- Born: August 16, 1985 (age 41); Springfield, Vermont, U.S.
- Batted: Left Threw: Right

MLB debut
- September 10, 2007, for the Oakland Athletics

Last MLB appearance
- May 13, 2014, for the Oakland Athletics

MLB statistics
- Batting average: .247
- Home runs: 30
- Runs batted in: 184
- Stats at Baseball Reference

Teams
- Oakland Athletics (2007–2014)

Daric William Barton (born August 16, 1985) is an American former professional baseball first baseman. He played in Major League Baseball (MLB) for the Oakland Athletics.

== Career ==
=== St. Louis Cardinals ===
==== Minor leagues ====
Barton was drafted by the St. Louis Cardinals in the 2003 Major League Baseball draft in the 1st round as the 28th player selected. He was selected right out of Marina High School in Huntington Beach, California. Barton had signed on to attend Cal State Fullerton and play baseball there, but accepted a $1 million signing bonus from the Cardinals instead.

Barton began his professional career with the rookie-level Johnson City Cardinals in 2003, mainly playing as a catcher. In 54 games, he batted .291 with 4 home runs.

In 2004, Barton advanced to the Peoria Chiefs, the Cardinals' Single-A affiliate. He played in just 90 games for the Chiefs, batting .313 with 13 home runs. Barton was named to the Midwest League Postseason All-Star team. He led the Midwest League in on-base percentage (.445), was third in the league in batting average (.313), and fourth in the league in slugging percentage (.511).

=== Oakland Athletics ===
On December 19, 2004, Barton was traded along with pitchers Dan Haren and Kiko Calero to the Oakland Athletics in exchange for starting pitcher Mark Mulder. Barton was #32 out of 100 on Baseball America's Top 100 Prospects list in 2005. After having an emergency appendectomy part way through spring training, Barton started the 2005 season slowly, but ended the year with a .317 batting average. He spent most of 2005 with the Single-A Stockton Ports of the California League, but also appeared in 56 games for the Double-A Midland RockHounds of the Texas League. Barton was also selected to play in the All-Star Futures Game at PNC Park in Pittsburgh. With the Cardinals, Barton played catcher, but the Athletics moved Barton to first base due to concerns with Barton's ability behind the plate, the negative impact catching can have on the development of a young hitter, and because the Athletics had a number of more advanced catching prospects (Kurt Suzuki, Jeremy Brown, and Landon Powell).

In 2006, Barton once again appeared on Baseball America's Top 100 Prospects list, this time ranking at #28. He was also ranked as the Athletics' #1 prospect. Barton played for the Triple-A Sacramento River Cats in 2006. However, due to injuries Barton played in only 43 games, batting .259 with 2 home runs.

In 2007, Barton appeared on Baseball America's Top 100 Prospects list, this time ranked at just #67. He was ranked as the Athletics' #2 prospect behind outfielder Travis Buck, who ranked at #50 on the Top 100 Prospects list. Barton began the 2007 season slowly with the River Cats, hitting just .221 in April and .273 in May. He finally got started in June when he hit .454 in 27 games. Barton was named to the Pacific Coast League Mid-Season All-Star team on July 11. He finished the 2007 minor league season with a .293 batting average and nine home runs in 137 games.

Following the 2007 minor league season, the River Cats advanced to the first round of the playoffs. They played the Salt Lake Bees, the Los Angeles Angels of Anaheim' Triple-A affiliate. In the first round, Barton batted .550 (11–20) with 10 RBIs. He had a power surge with 4 home runs and one of the home runs was a decisive one in Game 5 as it led the River Cats into the second round of the playoffs. He did not join the team for the second round as he had his contract purchased by the Athletics major league club on September 10.

==== Major leagues ====
Barton made his major league debut on September 10, 2007, against the Seattle Mariners. In his third plate appearance, he had his first major league hit off Ryan Feierabend, a double. He had two hits in his major league debut for Oakland, a feat that was not matched until Nate Freiman did it in 2013. On September 14, Barton hit his first major league home run. Barton played in 18 games in 2007. He reached base safely in all 18 games via a hit or a walk. He batted .347 (25-for-72) with four home runs and eight RBI.

In 2008, Barton was the Athletics' starting first baseman. He batted just .226 with nine home runs and 47 RBI in 140 games. During the All-Star break, Barton dove into a shallow pool and hit his head on the bottom. He suffered a jammed neck and had to get staples to close a cut on his head.

On April 5, 2009, the day before the Athletics' season opener, Barton was demoted to Triple-A Sacramento. He made 54 appearances for Oakland during the year, slashing .269/.372/.413 with three home runs and 24 RBI.

Barton began the 2010 season as the Athletics' starting first baseman. On April 25, 2010, he fractured his finger while tumbling into the Cleveland Indians' dugout. He won a Fielding Bible Award for his statistically based defensive excellence during the year and led his team in runs (79), hits (152), and doubles (33) and accumulated an All-Star caliber 5.5 WAR. He also led the AL in walks with 110, and was second in MLB only to Prince Fielder.

Barton was once again selected as the starting first baseman for the Athletics at the beginning of the 2011 season. On June 22, 2011, the A's sent Barton back to Triple-A Sacramento to clear roster space for Mark Ellis. Barton was hitting .212 with no home runs at the time. For the season, he batted .212 in 236 at-bats.

On June 2, 2012, a struggling Barton was optioned to Triple-A. For the season, he batted .204.

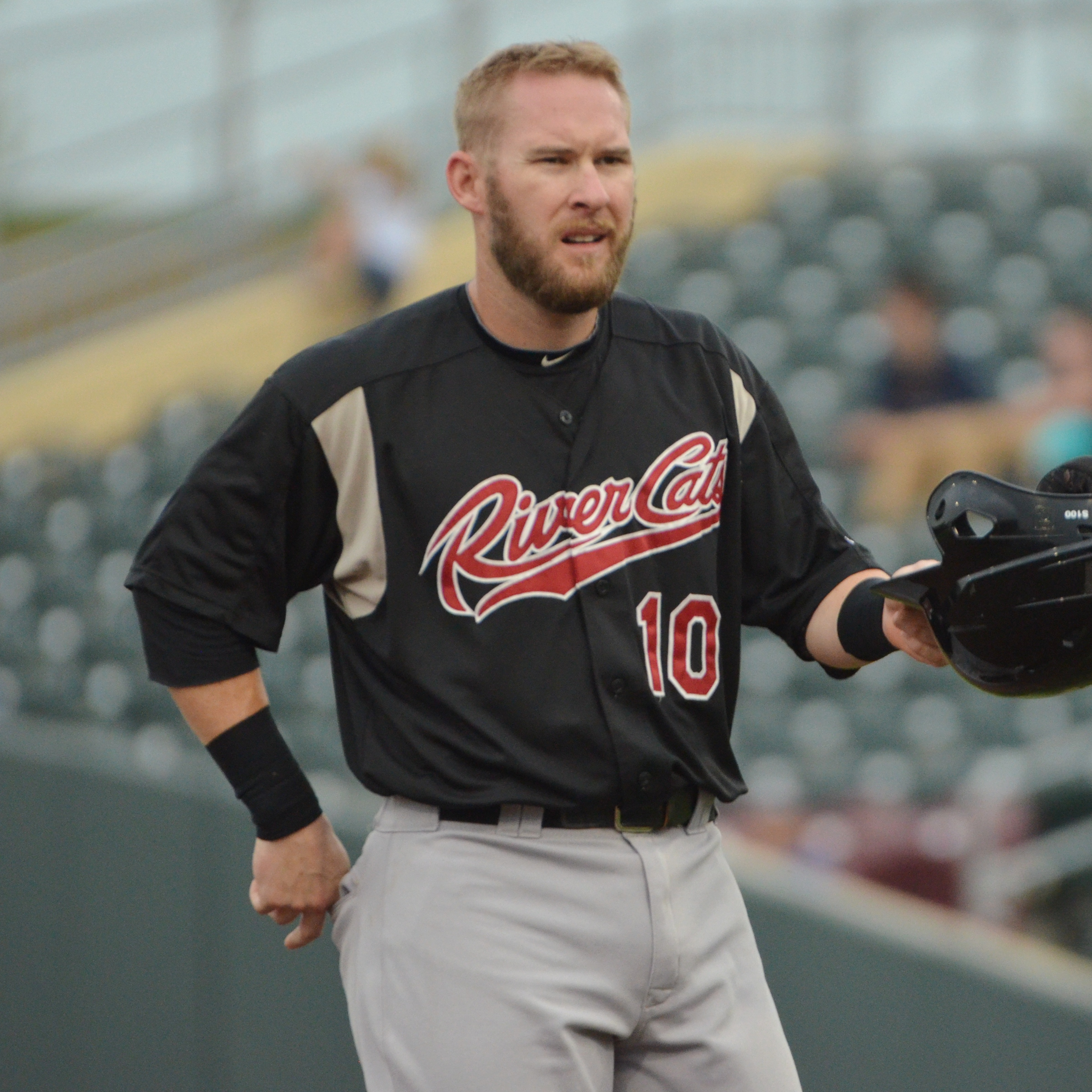
Barton during his tenure with the Sacramento River Cats, Triple-A affiliates of the Athletics, in 2013

On March 29, 2013, Barton was designated for assignment by the Athletics.

In May of the 2013 season, Barton was added back on the 40-man roster when right fielder Josh Reddick was placed on the disabled list after injuring his wrist. Everyday first basemen Brandon Moss was moved over to right field. Barton took Reddick's spot on the active roster and covered everyday first base duties. Barton was than designated for assignment again when Reddick returned. He cleared waivers and was sent outright to Triple-A Sacramento on May 21. On August 26, Barton was added to the 40-man roster again for the same reason.

On December 20, 2013, Barton signed a one-year deal with Oakland, avoiding arbitration. The Athletics designated Barton for assignment on May 15, 2014, when they acquired Kyle Blanks. In October 2014, Barton elected to become a free agent.

=== Toronto Blue Jays ===
On December 16, 2014, Barton signed a minor-league contract with the Toronto Blue Jays that included an invitation to spring training. He was assigned to the minor league spring training camp on March 30, 2015. On July 2, Barton was released. He batted .219 in 31 minor league games with the Triple-A Buffalo Bisons and Double-A New Hampshire Fisher Cats.

=== Pericos de Puebla ===
On April 1, 2016, Barton signed with the Pericos de Puebla of the Mexican League. On September 14, Barton won the Serie del Rey with Puebla. Barton was key to the Pericos winning their first championship in over 30 years as he led the team with 21 home runs and despite missing 20 games with a broken finger was voted as the starting first baseman on the All-Star team. Additionally, Barton won the league Gold Glove for his defense. He added 5 more home runs in the playoffs including the go-ahead shot in the 6th inning of the Championship clinching game.

=== Acereros de Monclova ===
On February 21, 2017, Barton, along with Chad Gaudin, Manny Rodriguez, Nyjer Morgan, Rodolfo Amador, and Willy Taveras, were traded to the Acereros de Monclova in exchange for RHP Joaquín Lara. Barton only appeared in 26 games for the Acereros before spending the rest of the season on the reserve list. In those 26 appearances, he batted .217/.421/.391 with three home runs and nine RBI.

=== Pericos de Puebla (second stint) ===
On January 16, 2018, Barton was traded back to the Pericos de Puebla. He once again excelled with the team, finishing as one of the league leaders in average at .373 during the Spring Tournament of the 2018 season. Barton left the Pericos on August 6, halfway through the Fall Tournament, for personal reasons and to prepare for the 2018-19 Mexican Pacific League (LMP) season with the Charros de Jalisco. He retired as an active player following the LMP season.

== Scouting report ==
Barton was a patient hitter. In 9 minor league seasons, he had 446 walks as opposed to 382 strikeouts. In 2010, Barton was one of only two players in MLB to have more walks than strikeouts, the other being Albert Pujols.
