= Shawn Haviland =

American baseball player (born 1985)

Boston Red Sox
- Pitcher/Pitching coordinator
- Born: November 10, 1985 (age 40); Middletown, Connecticut
- Stats at Baseball Reference

Teams
- As coach: Boston Red Sox (2019–present)

Shawn Parker Haviland (born November 10, 1985) is an American former professional baseball pitcher who works in player development for the Boston Red Sox of Major League Baseball (MLB).

== Playing career ==
=== Amateur baseball ===
Haviland attended Farmington High School (Connecticut). Clayton Haviland, Haviland’s grandfather, played for Cornell Big Red baseball, and Tim Haviland, his father, played for Connecticut Huskies baseball.

Haviland played college baseball for Harvard Crimson baseball. In 2006, Haviland was named Ivy League Pitcher of the Year. In 2005, Haviland helped Harvard win the Ivy League Baseball Championship Series, qualifying the team for the 2005 NCAA Division I baseball tournament. While in college, Haviland spent three summers in the Cape Cod Baseball League, pitching for the Wareham Gatemen and Yarmouth-Dennis Red Sox. In 2008, Haviland graduated from Harvard University with a degree in government. Haviland was selected in the 33rd round of the 2008 Major League Baseball draft by the Oakland Athletics.

=== Oakland Athletics ===
Haviland was assigned to A's Low–A affiliate team, the Vancouver Canadians. In 2009, Haviland played for the Single–A Kane County Cougars.

In 2010, he played for the Triple–A Sacramento River Cats and the High–A Stockton Ports. Haviland's pitching ranked in the top in the A's farm system during the 2010 Oakland Athletics season. Haviland had the most strikeouts of all A's minor leaguers with 169 strikeouts. Between 2011 and 2014, Haviland remained in the A's farm system, playing for the Double–A Midland RockHounds and the High–A Stockton Ports.

=== Chicago White Sox ===
Haviland became a free agent and signed a minor league contract with the Chicago White Sox on January 12, 2015. He played in 19 games with the Triple–A Charlotte Knights, he logged a 4–5 record and 4.19 ERA with 59 strikeouts in 77 1/3 innings pitched.

=== Colorado Rockies ===
On July 22, 2015, Haviland was traded to the Colorado Rockies in exchange for cash considerations. Despite being assigned to the New Britain Rock Cats, he did not make an appearance for the organization.

=== Boston Red Sox ===
On August 8, 2015, Haviland was traded to the Boston Red Sox and assigned to the Triple–A Pawtucket Red Sox. In 6 starts down the stretch, Haviland posted a 1–5 record and 4.17 ERA with 23 strikeouts across 36 2/3 innings of work.

=== Chicago White Sox (second stint) ===
On February 10, 2016, Haviland signed a minor league contract with the Chicago White Sox organization. He was released by the team near the end of spring training on March 26.

=== New Britain Bees ===
Later in 2016, Haviland signed the New Britain Bees of the Atlantic League of Professional Baseball. Haviland made 22 appearances (13 starts) for New Britain, posting a 3.34 ERA with 70 strikeouts in 94 1/3 innings of work.

=== Cleveland Indians ===
On August 3, 2016, the Cleveland Indians signed Haviland to a minor league contract and assigned him to the Triple–A Columbus Clippers. In 7 starts for Columbus, he worked to a 3.40 ERA with 30 strikeouts in 42 1/3 innings pitched. Haviland elected free agency following the season on November 7.

=== Boston Red Sox (second stint) ===
On January 4, 2017, Haviland signed a minor league contract with the Boston Red Sox, marking his second stint with the organization. He appeared in some spring training games for the Red Sox, including a start against the Tampa Bay Rays. Haviland also appeared in a game with United States national baseball team. Later, Haviland appeared as a starting pitcher for the Pawtucket Red Sox. In 23 contests (which included 17 starts), he registered a 6–8 record and 4.33 ERA with 99 strikeouts in 126 2/3 innings pitched. Haviland elected free agency following the season on November 6.

== Post-playing career ==
Haviland spent the 2019 season as a pitching performance coach with the Red Sox, and was named a pitching coordinator in January 2020. He uses data and analytics in his role. In 2024, he was named special assistant for player development.
