= José Manuel Rodríguez (baseball) =

Mexican baseball player (born 1982)

Saraperos de Saltillo – No. 13
- Second baseman / Coach
- Born: July 28, 1982 (age 43); El Cubilete, Sinaloa, Mexico
- Bats: Right Throws: Right
- Stats at Baseball Reference

José Manuel Rodríguez (born July 28, 1982) is a Mexican former professional baseball second baseman and current coach for the Saraperos de Saltillo of the Mexican League, and Charros de Jalisco of the Mexican Pacific League, where he plays during the winter.

== Professional career ==
Rodríguez began his career for the Chillicothe Paints of the Frontier League in 2004 and joined the Saraperos de Saltillo of the Mexican League in 2006. Rodríguez played with the club every year through the 2015 season.

On April 16, 2008, Rodríguez hit for the cycle in the Saraperos 22–11 victory against Vaqueros Laguna. On November 6, 2015, Rodríguez was traded to the Pericos de Puebla in exchange for Rolando Acosta. On February 21, 2017, Rodríguez was traded to the Acereros de Monclova alongside Chad Gaudin, Daric Barton, Nyjer Morgan, Rodolfo Amador, and Willy Taveras in exchange for Joaquin Lara. On April 26, 2018, Rodríguez was assigned to the Tigres de Quintana Roo. On April 3, 2019, Rodríguez re-signed with the Tigres for the 2019 season. On May 7, 2019, Rodríguez was loaned to the Saraperos de Saltillo. Rodríguez did not play in a game in 2020 due to the cancellation of the Mexican League season because of the COVID-19 pandemic.

On November 30, 2023, the Saraperos released Rodríguez as a player and added him to their coaching staff.

== International career ==
Rodriguez has played for the Mexico national baseball team at the 2008 Summer Olympics and the 2017 World Baseball Classic.

== Personal life ==
Rodríguez was born in El Cubilete, Guasave Municipality, Sinaloa, and moved to the United States at a young age.
