= Adam Rosales =

American baseball player (born 1983)

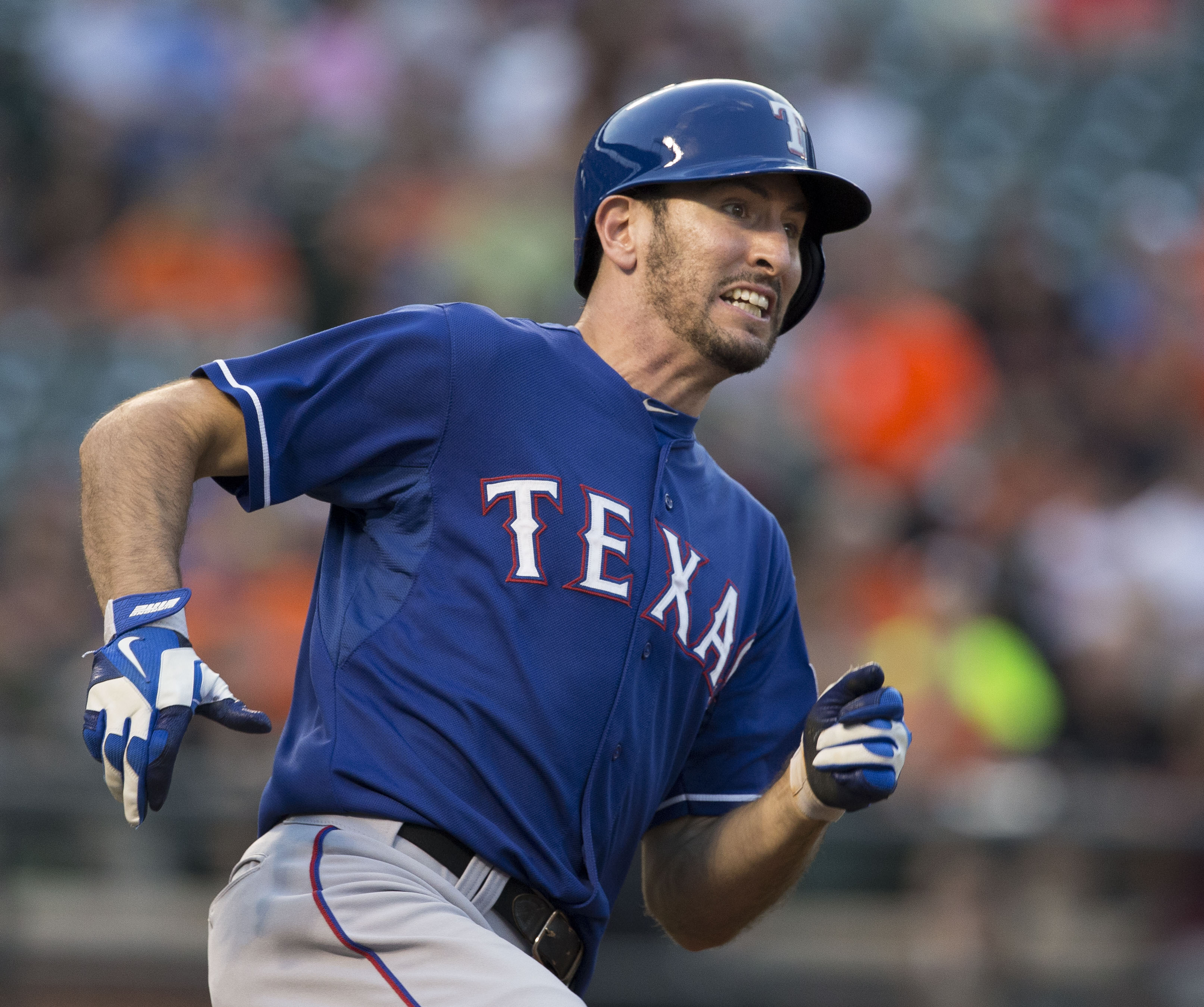
- Rosales with the Texas Rangers
- Infielder
- Born: May 20, 1983 (age 43); Chicago, Illinois, U.S.
- Batted: Right Threw: Right

MLB debut
- August 9, 2008, for the Cincinnati Reds

Last MLB appearance
- September 30, 2018, for the Cleveland Indians

MLB statistics
- Batting average: .226
- Home runs: 48
- Runs batted in: 179
- Stats at Baseball Reference

Teams
- Cincinnati Reds (2008–2009); Oakland Athletics (2010–2013); Texas Rangers (2013–2015); San Diego Padres (2016); Oakland Athletics (2017); Arizona Diamondbacks (2017); Cleveland Indians (2018)

Adam Marcos Rosales (born May 20, 1983) is an American former professional baseball infielder. He played in Major League Baseball (MLB) for the Cincinnati Reds, Oakland Athletics, Texas Rangers, San Diego Padres, Arizona Diamondbacks, and Cleveland Indians.

== Early and personal life ==
In his youth, Adam played shortstop for the Diamonds 13 yr. old traveling baseball team in 1996, which won several tournaments including the annual Thillens Championship tournament. The Thillens tournament was one of the best amateur tournaments in the Chicagoland area. The Diamonds team was co-managed by Frank Sadorf & Pete Podgorski. Rosales, who is of Mexican-American descent, attended Maine South High School in Park Ridge, Illinois, where he received All-State honors, and Western Michigan University in Kalamazoo, Michigan.

Rosales is a practicing member of the LDS church. He and his wife, Callie, had a daughter, Juliet, born in June 2014.

== Professional career ==
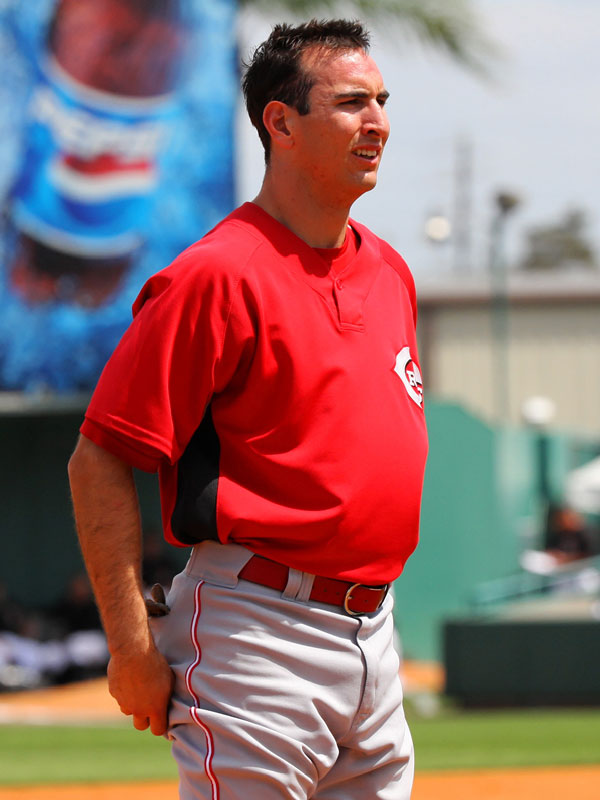
Rosales during his tenure with the Cincinnati Reds in 2009 spring training

=== Cincinnati Reds ===
He made his Major League debut as a pinch hitter for the Cincinnati Reds on August 9, 2008. Rosales was recalled from Louisville on August 20 following the injury of Jerry Hairston Jr.

Rosales began the 2009 season with the Triple-A Louisville Bats after failing to earn a spot on the Reds' roster. He was called up on April 28 following the placement of Edwin Encarnación on the 15-day disabled list. He was sent back to the minors exactly two months later.

=== Oakland Athletics ===
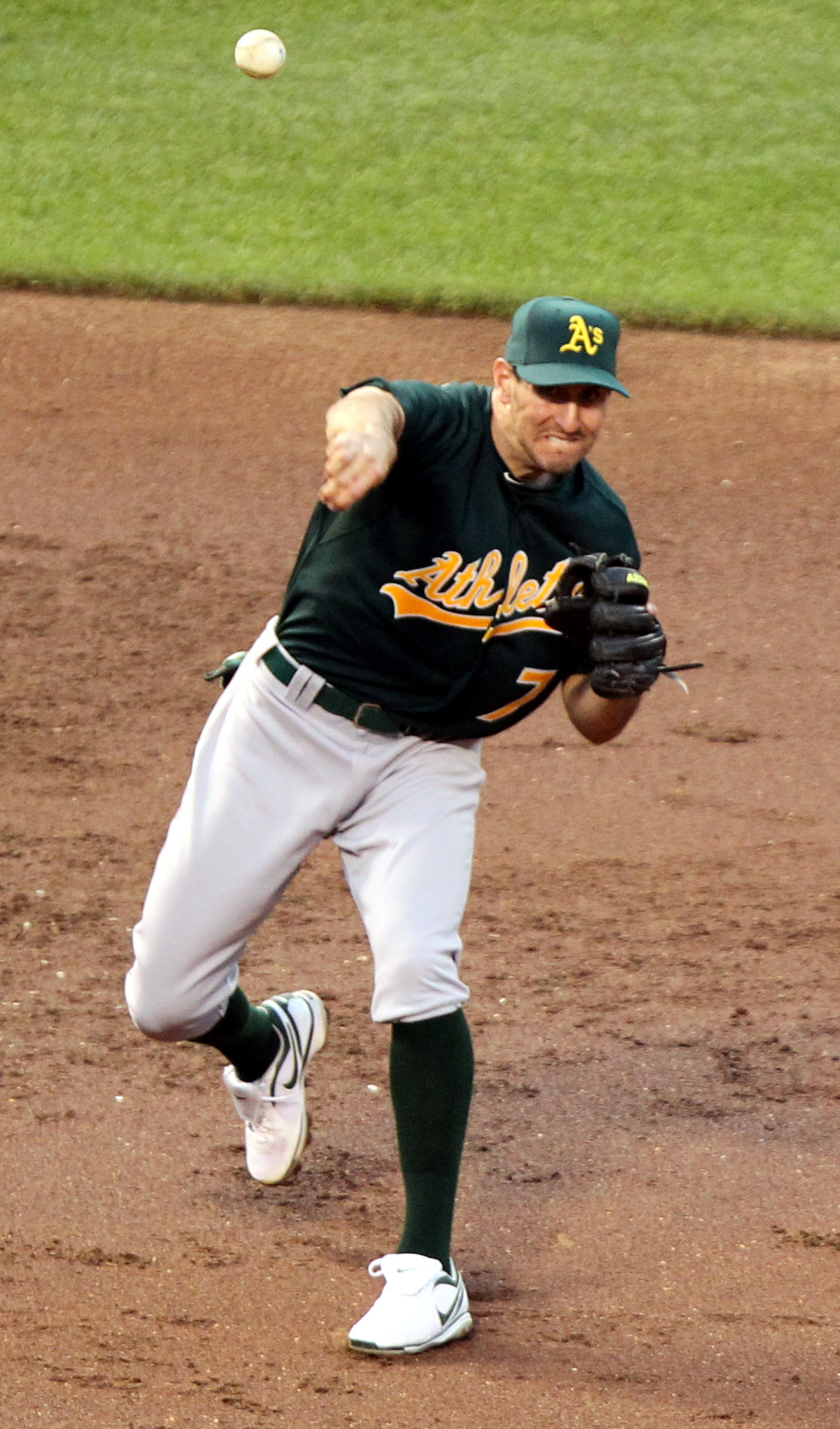
Rosales playing for the Oakland Athletics in 2011

On February 1, 2010, Rosales was traded along with Willy Taveras to the Oakland Athletics for Aaron Miles and a player to be named later. In his first three years with the A's, Rosales batted .234 with a .292 on-base percentage in 415 at-bats, 11 home runs, 47 RBIs, and two stolen bases in four attempts.

On November 30, 2012, Rosales avoided arbitration by signing a one-year, $700,000 deal with the A's. He began 2013 on the disabled list, and was activated on April 25, replacing Andy Parrino. In the ninth inning of a game on May 8, 2013, Rosales hit what appeared to be a game tying home run, but it was ruled a double, despite the ball hitting a railing in left field above the outfield wall and bouncing back onto the field. Umpire Ángel Hernández and his crew reviewed the play, and upheld the original ruling as a double. Following the controversial call, manager Bob Melvin was ejected for arguing; the A's went on to lose to the Cleveland Indians by a score of 4–3. Rosales got a lot of starting time at shortstop with Jed Lowrie playing second base against left-handed pitchers. However, after a long run of facing right-handed starters and the emergence of Grant Green, Rosales was designated for assignment on July 8. After Green struggled in his first stint in the majors, Rosales was called up to replace him on July 24. When the Athletics acquired Alberto Callaspo on July 31, coincidentally for Green, Rosales was designated for assignment, starting his 11-day journey.

==== Designated for assignment three times in 11 days ====
Rosales was designated for assignment on July 31, and on August 2, Rosales was claimed off waivers by the Texas Rangers. Rosales did not appear in any games for the Rangers prior to being designated for assignment on August 5 to make room for Joey Butler. On August 8, Rosales was claimed by the Athletics. He played in one game with Oakland before they once again designated him for assignment on August 10, and once again he was claimed by the Texas Rangers on August 12. In 51 games for Oakland in 2013, Rosales hit .191/.267/.316 with 4 home runs and 8 RBI.

=== Texas Rangers ===
Rosales started twice for the Rangers in 2013, but was mostly used off the bench in his 17 games. In 68 games with the Athletics and the Rangers, Rosales hit .190/.259/.327 with 5 home runs and 12 RBI.

On November 14, Rosales signed a one-year, $750,000 deal to avoid arbitration with the Rangers for 2014. He was designated for assignment on March 30, 2014. He was called up to the majors on June 30, 2014. He was non-tendered on December 2, 2014, and became a free agent, but re-signed on January 5, 2015. He was designated for assignment yet again on August 19, 2015, and released four days later.

=== San Diego Padres ===
On January 1, 2016, Rosales signed a minor league contract with the San Diego Padres. On April 3, 2016, the Padres announced that Rosales had made their Opening Day roster. Rosales appeared in the most games in a full season in his career, hitting .229 with 13 home runs and 35 RBI in 105 games.

=== Oakland Athletics (second stint) ===
On January 25, 2017, Rosales signed a one-year contract with the Oakland Athletics. He appeared in 71 games for the Athletics, hitting .234.

=== Arizona Diamondbacks ===
On July 31, 2017, Rosales was traded to the Arizona Diamondbacks for Jeferson Mejia. He appeared in 34 games with the Diamondbacks, hitting .202 with 3 home runs and 9 RBI. He appeared in a lone game in the NLDS without recording a hit in 3 plate appearances. He was granted free agency on November 2, 2017.

=== Philadelphia Phillies ===
On February 1, 2018, Rosales signed a minor league contract with the Philadelphia Phillies. He was released by the Phillies on March 23, 2018.

=== Cleveland Indians ===
On March 27, 2018, Rosales signed a minor league contract with the Cleveland Indians. The Indians purchased Rosales's contract on September 4. He appeared in 13 games for the Indians, hitting .211 with one home run and two RBI. He was granted free agency on October 29.

=== Minnesota Twins ===
On February 8, 2019, Rosales signed a minor league deal with the Twins that included an invitation to spring training. He was released on March 22, but re-signed with the Twins on March 26, and opened the season with the Triple–A Rochester Red Wings.

=== Cleveland Indians (second stint) ===
On May 4, 2019, Rosales was traded to the Cleveland Indians in exchange for cash considerations. In 56 games for the Triple—A Columbus Clippers, he batted .215/.270/.360 with seven home runs and 19 RBI. Rosales elected free agency following the season on November 4.

== Coaching career ==
On November 5, 2019, Rosales was hired by the Oakland Athletics as a minor league coach.

Prior to the 2024 season, he was named the hitting coach for the rookie–level Arizona Complex League Athletics. On February 6, 2026, he was announced as the team's base-running coach.
