= Justin James (baseball) =

American baseball player (born 1981)

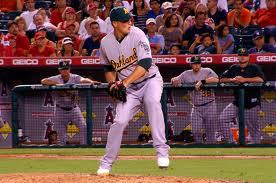
- James with the Oakland Athletics
- Pitcher
- Born: September 13, 1981 (age 44); Yukon, Oklahoma, U.S.
- Batted: Right Threw: Right

MLB debut
- September 2, 2010, for the Oakland Athletics

Last MLB appearance
- September 27, 2010, for the Oakland Athletics

MLB statistics
- Win–loss record: 0–0
- Earned run average: 4.50
- Strikeouts: 5
- Stats at Baseball Reference

Teams
- Oakland Athletics (2010)

Justin Duane James (born September 13, 1981) is an American former professional baseball pitcher. He played in Major League Baseball for the Oakland Athletics in 2010.

James attended the University of Missouri. He was drafted by the Boston Red Sox in the 6th round of the 2001 MLB draft, but did not sign. In 2002, he played collegiate summer baseball with the Brewster Whitecaps of the Cape Cod Baseball League. He was selected again by the Toronto Blue Jays in the 5th round of the 2003 MLB draft, and signed.

In 2007, James was traded to the Cincinnati Reds. He played for the Reds organization in 2008, but became a minor league free agent. In 2009, James played for the Kansas City T-Bones of the independent Northern League.

The Athletics purchased James' contract in June 2010. He received his first promotion to the major leagues on September 1, 2010, making his major league debut the following day.

On November 2, 2010, James was claimed off waivers by the Milwaukee Brewers. He was outrighted to Triple-A on June 27, 2011. James currently lives in Columbia, MO where he coaches baseball and is the operating owner of Nutrishop Columbia, a supplement and nutrition store.
