= Jeff Larish =

American baseball player (born 1982)

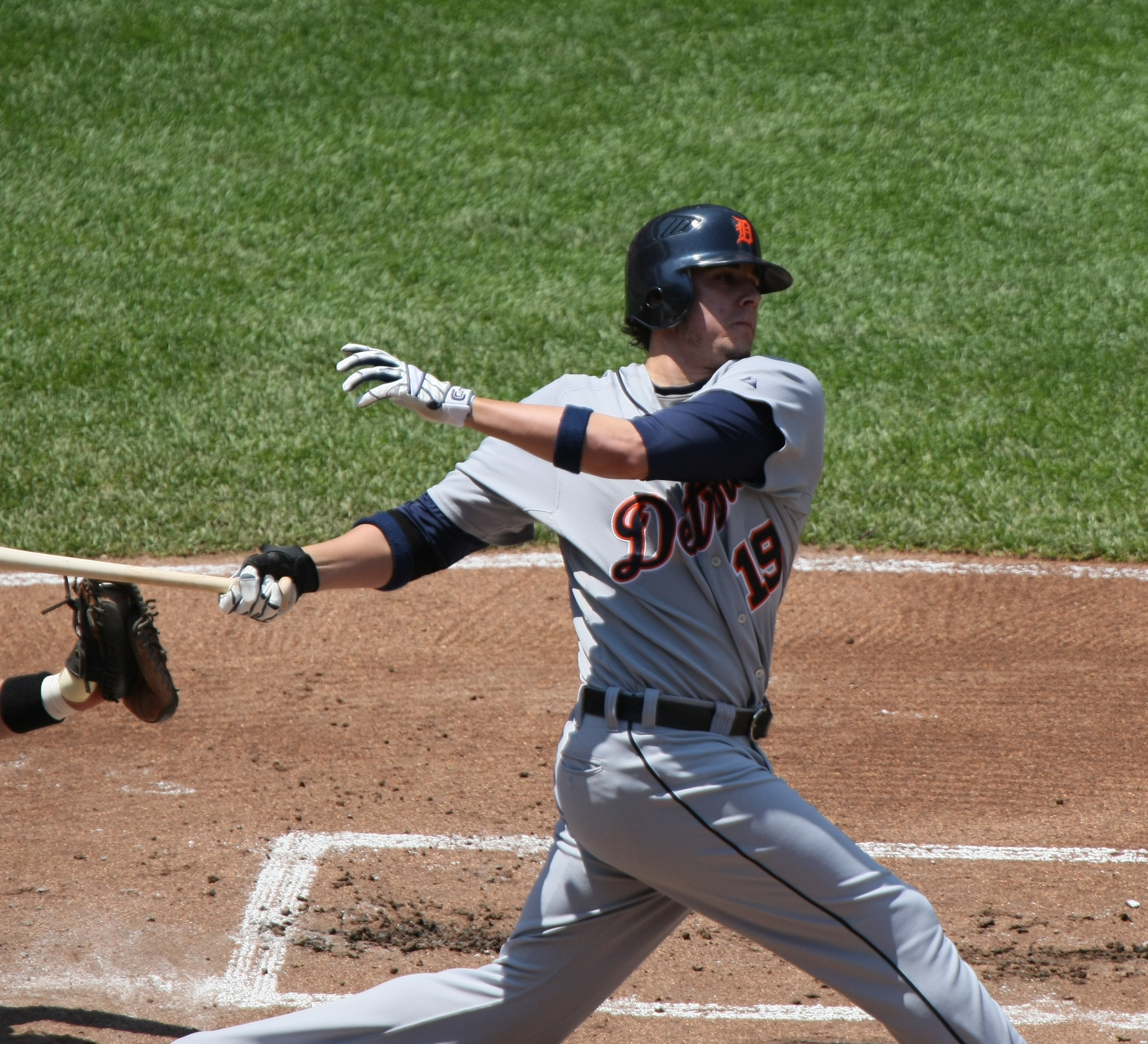
- Larish in the batter's box
- First baseman / Third baseman
- Born: October 11, 1982 (age 43); Iowa City, Iowa, U.S.
- Batted: Left Threw: Right

MLB debut
- May 30, 2008, for the Detroit Tigers

Last MLB appearance
- October 3, 2010, for the Oakland Athletics

MLB statistics
- Batting average: .224
- Home runs: 8
- Runs batted in: 32
- Stats at Baseball Reference

Teams
- Detroit Tigers (2008–2010); Oakland Athletics (2010)
Medals
Men's baseball
Representing United States
Pan American Games
Silver medal – second place	2003 Santo Domingo	Team

Jeffrey David Larish (born October 11, 1982) is an American former professional baseball infielder and outfielder. He played in Major League Baseball (MLB) for the Detroit Tigers and Oakland Athletics.

== Early life ==
Jeffrey Larish was born on October 11, 1982 in Iowa City, Iowa, United States.

== Amateur career ==
Larish attended McClintock High School. Larish was chosen by the Chicago Cubs in the 32nd round of the 2001 Major League Baseball draft, but chose to attend college at Arizona State University. Larish was chosen by the Los Angeles Dodgers in the 15th round of the 2004 Major League Baseball draft, but turned down a reported $660,000 contract offer at the advice of his agent, Scott Boras, so that he could complete college. On June 21, 2005, Larish became the third College World Series player in history to hit three home runs in a single game.

== Professional career ==
=== Detroit Tigers ===
Larish was chosen by the Detroit Tigers in the fifth round (150th overall) of the 2005 MLB draft. In 2007, Larish was honored as the Tigers Minor League Player of the Year. On January 25, 2010, Larish was optioned to Triple-A Toledo Mud Hens. On July 25, Larish was recalled to the Detroit Tigers when Magglio Ordóñez and Carlos Guillén were sent to the disabled list. Larish had a Statue of Liberty batting stance. He stood straight up with absolutely no movement other than pushing off on his left leg as he began his swing. On July 30, Larish was designated for assignment by the Tigers.

=== Oakland Athletics ===
On August 3, 2010, Larish was claimed off waivers by the Oakland Athletics, and subsequently assigned to the Triple-A Sacramento River Cats. On August 6, Larish had 10 RBI in a doubleheader sweep at Isotopes Park. The River Cats won both games, 14–5 and 12–3, respectively.

=== Philadelphia Phillies ===
On November 18, 2010, Larish signed a minor league contract with the Philadelphia Phillies. On July 14, 2011, Larish suffered a season-ending injury when he suffered a broken leg trying to score at home plate.

=== Pittsburgh Pirates ===
The Baltimore Orioles signed Larish to a minor league contract on February 3, 2012. However, he did not receive an invitation to spring training. At the end of spring training, Larish was released by the Orioles. On May 4, Larish signed a minor league contract with the Boston Red Sox, but never played in a game for the organization.

On May 12, 2012, Larish was traded to the Pittsburgh Pirates in exchange for cash considerations. On September 3, playing for the Triple-A Indianapolis Indians against the Louisville Bats, Larish attempted to play all nine positions. Larish began the game in left field, in the 2nd inning he was in center field, by the 3rd inning Larish was in right field. He played third base in the 4th, shortstop in the 5th, and second base in the 6th. He started the 7th inning at first base and became the pitcher with two outs in the inning. Larish failed to play catcher only because the game was shortened due to rain. Larish was credited with the save. He elected free agency on November 2.

On November 9, 2012, Larish re-signed with the Pirates on a minor league contract. In 20 appearances for Triple-A Indianapolis, he batted .167/.310/.313 with two home runs and five RBI. Larish was released by the Pirates organization on August 3, 2013.

== International career ==
Larish played on the United States national baseball team in the 2003 Pan American Games; the team took the silver medal and went 27–2 overall, at the time its best finish ever. Larish scored the only run in the team's 3–1 loss in the final game to Cuba.
