= Cedrick Bowers =

American baseball player (born 1978)

- Pitcher
- Born: February 10, 1978 (age 48); Gainesville, Florida, U.S.
- Batted: Switch Threw: Left

Professional debut
- NPB: 2004, for the Yokohama BayStars
- KBO: 2007, for the Hanwha Eagles
- MLB: July 2, 2008, for the Colorado Rockies

Last appearance
- NPB: 2005, for the Yokohama BayStars
- KBO: 2007, for the Hanwha Eagles
- MLB: July 30, 2010, for the Oakland Athletics

NPB statistics
- Win–loss record: 14–9
- Earned run average: 3.69
- Strikeouts: 186

KBO statistics
- Win–loss record: 11–13
- Earned run average: 4.15
- Strikeouts: 140

MLB statistics
- Win–loss record: 0–1
- Earned run average: 7.40
- Strikeouts: 23
- Stats at Baseball Reference

Teams
- Yokohama BayStars (2004–2005); Hanwha Eagles (2007); Colorado Rockies (2008); Oakland Athletics (2010)
Medals
Men's baseball
Representing United States
Baseball World Cup
Gold medal – first place	2009 Nettuno	Team

Cedrick Jerome Bowers (born February 10, 1978) is an American left-handed former professional baseball pitcher. He played in Major League Baseball (MLB) for the Colorado Rockies and Oakland Athletics, in Nippon Professional Baseball (NPB) for the Yokohama BayStars, and in the KBO League for the Hanwha Eagles.

== Career ==
Originally drafted by the Tampa Bay Devil Rays in 1996, Bowers pitched in the Rays' farm system until the end of the 2003 season without reaching the major leagues. In 2004, he went to Japan, where he pitched for three seasons in Nippon Professional Baseball.

After spending 2007 pitching in Korea, Bowers signed a minor league contract with the Rockies before the 2008 season. He was called up for the first time in his career on July 1, 2008, and made his major league debut with the Rockies on July 2. He became a free agent at the end of the season and re-signed with the Rockies on January 14, 2009. Bowers was later released by the Rockies and signed a minor league contract with the Philles. On December 14, 2009, he was signed by the Oakland Athletics.
