= Grant Desme =

American baseball player

- Center fielder
- Born: April 4, 1986 (age 39); Bakersfield, California
- Bats: Right Throws: Right
- Stats at Baseball Reference

Gregory Grant Desme (born April 4, 1986, in Bakersfield, California) is an American former professional baseball center fielder. Desme was a junior right fielder at Cal Poly in San Luis Obispo, when he was drafted in 2007 by the Oakland Athletics. After a 30-30 2009 season in the minors and being named Arizona Fall League MVP, Desme retired. Desme came out of retirement in 2018 to play with the Lancaster Barnstormers of the independent Atlantic League of Professional Baseball.

== Amateur career ==
=== High school ===
He attended Stockdale High School in Bakersfield and was an all-area selection as a junior and senior. He was first-team selectee for the Southwest Yosemite League (SWYL). As a senior, he was co-Most Valuable Player of the SWYL.

=== College ===
He started his college career at San Diego State University. He transferred to Cal Poly, where he was named 2007 Big West Conference Player of the Year.

== Professional career ==
=== Oakland Athletics ===
Desme began his professional baseball career with the Short-Season Vancouver Canadians of the Northwest League in 2007. Desme was selected in the second round of the 2007 Major League Baseball draft before being assigned to the Canadians. He batted .261 with three doubles, one home run, six RBIs and two stolen bases in 12 games. The next season, 2008, he only played two games after he injured his wrist in 2007 and his shoulder the next year. In 2009, Desme had an extraordinary season. He hit a combined .288 with 31 doubles, six triples, 31 home runs, 89 RBIs and 40 stolen bases in 131 games with the Class-A Kane County Cougars and the Class-A Advanced Stockton Ports.

=== Retirement ===
On January 22, 2010, it was reported that Desme planned to retire from professional baseball and study to become a priest. He said this about his situation:

I was doing well at baseball. But I really had to get down to the bottom of things - I love the game, but I aspire to higher things. I wasn't at peace where I was at. I have no regrets.

— Grant Desme, BBC News: January 22, 2010.

He took the name Matthew Desme of the Norbertine Order. He said he found great peace in the vows of poverty, celibacy, and obedience.

=== Lancaster Barnstormers ===
On May 22, 2018, Desme came out of retirement to join the Lancaster Barnstormers of the Atlantic League of Professional Baseball. He is serving as the head baseball coach at Ave Maria University. He became a free agent following the 2018 season.
