= Steve Tolleson =

American baseball player (born 1983)

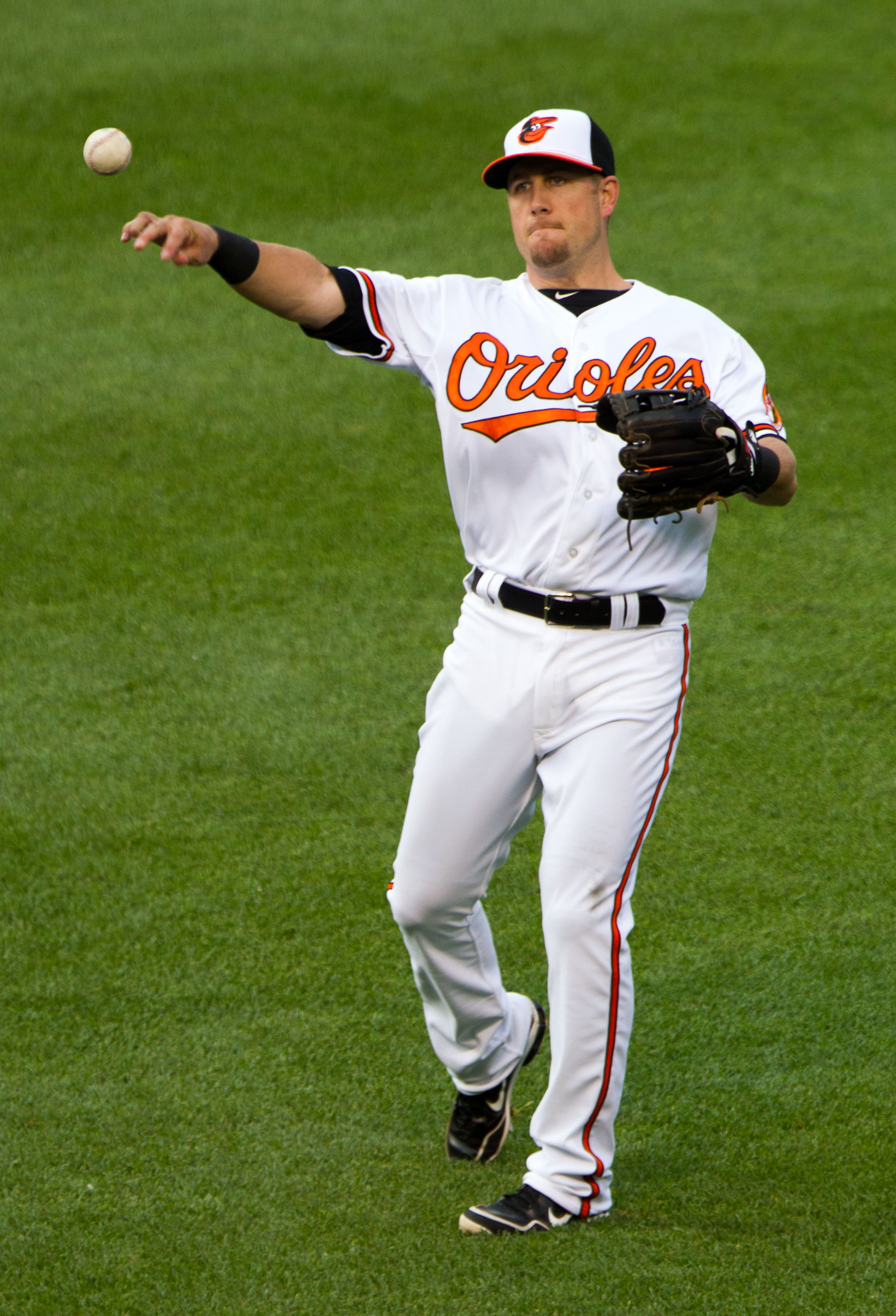
- Tolleson with the Baltimore Orioles
- Infielder
- Born: November 1, 1983 (age 42); Spartanburg, South Carolina, U.S.
- Batted: Right Threw: Right

MLB debut
- April 28, 2010, for the Oakland Athletics

Last MLB appearance
- May 26, 2015, for the Toronto Blue Jays

MLB statistics
- Batting average: .245
- Home runs: 6
- Runs batted in: 29
- Stats at Baseball Reference

Teams
- Oakland Athletics (2010); Baltimore Orioles (2012); Toronto Blue Jays (2014–2015)

Steven Wayne Tolleson (born November 1, 1983) is an American former professional baseball infielder who played in Major League Baseball (MLB) between 2010 and 2015 for the Oakland Athletics, Baltimore Orioles, and Toronto Blue Jays. He is the son of former major leaguer Wayne Tolleson.

== Amateur career ==
Tolleson had a career .425 batting average and 18 home runs at Paul M. Dorman High School in Roebuck, South Carolina. He also played for the University of South Carolina. In 2004, he played collegiate summer baseball with the Brewster Whitecaps of the Cape Cod Baseball League.

== Professional career ==
=== Minnesota Twins ===
He was selected by the Minnesota Twins in the fifth round of the 2005 Major League Baseball draft out of the University of South Carolina.

Tolleson batted .321 for the rookie Appalachian League Elizabethton Twins his first professional season to earn a promotion to the Beloit Snappers midway through the season. The Midwest League, however, proved to be too much for Tolleson as his batting average fell to .176. A year later, Tolleson redeemed himself, earning a Midwest League All-Star nod.

He was added to the Twins' 40-man roster on November 11, 2008.

In 2009, with the New Britain Rock Cats and Rochester Red Wings, Tolleson played all three outfield positions, second, short and third.

=== Oakland Athletics ===
On February 1, 2010, Tolleson was claimed off waivers by the Oakland Athletics. He made his big league debut with the A's on April 28 against the Toronto Blue Jays. Two days later, he picked up his first major league hit against Josh Roenicke of Toronto.

=== San Diego Padres ===
He was traded to the San Diego Padres on May 29, 2011, in exchange for a player to be named later.

=== Baltimore Orioles ===
On November 21, 2011, Tolleson signed a contract with the Baltimore Orioles. On May 9, 2012, the Orioles purchased Tolleson's contract and called him up. He hit .183 in 71 at-bats over several stints. After the season, he was outrighted off the Orioles' 40-man roster but refused the assignment and elected free agency.

=== Chicago White Sox ===
On November 13, 2012, Tolleson signed a minor league deal with the Chicago White Sox with an invitation to spring training. He spent the season with the Triple-A Charlotte Knights.

=== Toronto Blue Jays ===
On December 17, 2013, Tolleson signed a minor league deal with the Toronto Blue Jays that included an invitation to spring training. He was sent to minor league camp on March 24, 2014. The Blue Jays selected his contract from the Triple-A Buffalo Bisons on May 1. He made his debut for the Jays the following day, and recorded a pinch-hit triple and an RBI against the Pittsburgh Pirates. The triple was the first of his Major League career. On May 14, Tolleson pitched for the first time in the Majors, getting the final out in a 15–4 loss to the Cleveland Indians. In pitching for the Blue Jays, he became just the seventh position player to do so for the franchise, and first since Jeff Mathis in 2012. Tolleson hit his first home run as a Blue Jay on May 23, helping the team to a 3–2 win over the Oakland Athletics. He played in 109 games for the Blue Jays in 2014, mostly as a pinch hitter and late-innings replacement, and hit .253 with 3 home runs and 16 RBI.

Tolleson opened the 2015 season as the backup infielder for the Blue Jays. On April 24, 2015, he was designated for assignment to make room on the roster for Michael Saunders. He cleared waivers on May 5, and was assigned to the Triple-A Buffalo Bisons, but chose to become a free agent. On May 7, Tolleson signed a new minor league contract with the Blue Jays, allowing him to bypass a 10-day waiting period before he could be recalled to Toronto. On May 10, Tolleson was re-added to the active roster, after Michael Saunders was placed on the disabled list. He suffered a groin injury in late May and was placed on the disabled list. On July 1, Tolleson was activated from the disabled list and designated for assignment for the second time in 2015. He remained in the minors through the end of the season. Tolleson appeared in 19 games for the Blue Jays in 2015, and batted .268 with 3 RBI. He elected free agency on October 5, 2015.

=== Baltimore Orioles (second stint) ===
On November 23, 2015, Tolleson signed a minor league contract with the Baltimore Orioles that included an invitation to spring training. He was released by the Orioles organization on May 24, 2016.

=== Kansas City Royals ===
On May 27, 2016, Tolleson signed a minor league contract with the Kansas City Royals organization. He played in three games for the Triple–A Omaha Storm Chasers, going 0–for–4. Tolleson elected free agency following the season on November 7.

== See also ==
- List of second-generation Major League Baseball players
