= Grant Green (baseball) =

American baseball player (born 1987)

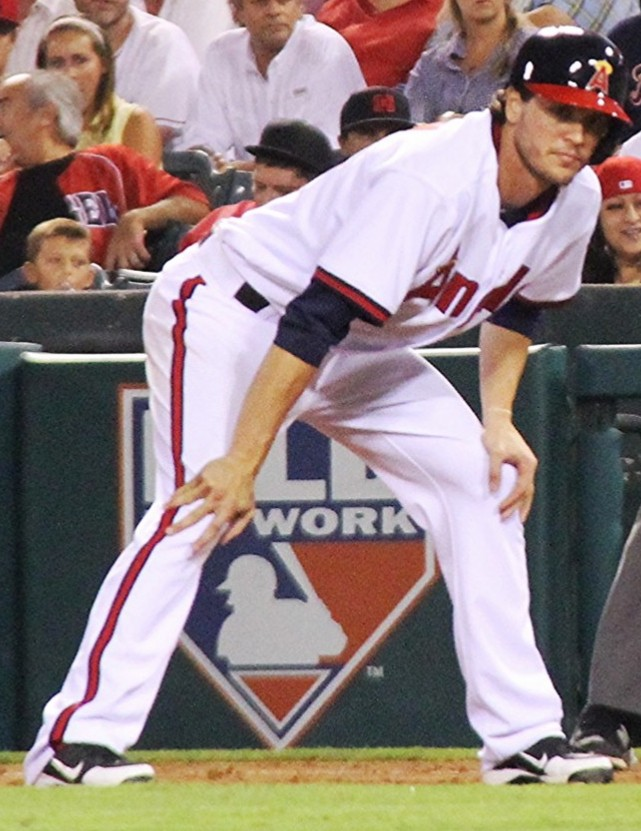
- Green with the Los Angeles Angels of Anaheim in 2013
- Second baseman
- Born: September 27, 1987 (age 38); Fullerton, California, U.S.
- Batted: Right Threw: Right

MLB debut
- July 8, 2013, for the Oakland Athletics

Last MLB appearance
- April 20, 2017, for the Washington Nationals

MLB statistics
- Batting average: .248
- Home runs: 4
- Runs batted in: 38
- Stats at Baseball Reference

Teams
- Oakland Athletics (2013); Los Angeles Angels of Anaheim (2013–2015); San Francisco Giants (2016); Washington Nationals (2017)

Grant Thomas Green (born September 27, 1987) is an American former professional baseball second baseman. He played in Major League Baseball (MLB) for the Oakland Athletics, Los Angeles Angels of Anaheim, San Francisco Giants, and Washington Nationals. Green attended the University of Southern California (USC) and played college baseball for the USC Trojans.

== High school career ==
Green played baseball at Canyon High School in Anaheim, California. As a high school sophomore, Green batted .430 (31-for-72) with eight doubles and 22 RBI. In his junior season, he batted .455 (40-for-88) with three home runs, 30 RBI and 14 stolen bases, a performance he duplicated as a senior when he batted .453 with four home runs, 22 RBI, and 14 stolen bases. Green earned first team honors from the California Interscholastic Federation and the Orange County Register. After his senior season, he was the 14th-round draft choice of the San Diego Padres, but he opted to attend the University of Southern California (USC) instead.

Green also experienced success with the 2005 U.S. Junior National Team. He batted .412 with six RBI and two stolen bases at the 2005 COPABE "AAA" Pan Am Junior Championships in Villahermosa, Mexico.

== College career ==
Green started every game for the USC Trojans as a true freshman in 2007. He batted .316 (72-for-228) with two home runs, 14 doubles, 24 RBI and six stolen bases. Green collected several postseason honors, including Pac-10 Conference Co-Freshman of the Year. As a sophomore in 2008, Green batted .390 (80-for-205) with nine home runs, 46 RBI, and 10 stolen bases. He was named a member of Baseball America's All-America third team and also earned All-Pacific-10 Conference honors.

Before Green's junior season, Baseball America rated him as the third best college prospect in the nation. However, Green's junior season began slowly, as he was batting only .234 after 13 games. However, he turned in an impressive performance by season's end, batting .374 (79-for-211) overall, with four home runs, 32 RBI, and 16 stolen bases in 24 attempts. He led the Trojans with a .435 on-base percentage and 26 multi-hit games.

In 2007, Green played collegiate summer baseball in the Cape Cod Baseball League (CCBL) for the Yarmouth-Dennis Red Sox. He returned to the CCBL in 2008 to play for the Chatham Anglers, where he was honored by the league as its top pro prospect. He was among the league leaders in most offensive categories but struggled defensively, committing 17 errors in 41 games. Green was elected to the CCBL Hall of Fame in 2026.

== 2009 Draft ==
As the 2009 baseball draft approached, Green was very highly regarded among experts, who expected him to be drafted high in the first round. He was drafted by the Oakland Athletics in the first round of the 2009 Major League Baseball draft as the 13th overall selection as a shortstop. Although some scouts had projected him as a future third baseman, both Green and the Athletics stated a desire for him to remain at shortstop. Green was advised by high-profile sports agent Scott Boras. He signed a contract with a signing bonus of $2.75 million on August 17, 2009, just minutes before the deadline to sign draft picks passed.

== Professional career ==
=== Oakland Athletics ===
Green played in five minor league games during the 2009 season, all at Single-A Stockton. Starting the 2010 season, he was rated as Oakland's third best prospect according to Baseball America and was a non-roster invitee to the A's spring training camp as part of his contract. He spent the entire season at Stockton and was selected for the Futures Games. He played in the Arizona Fall League in 2010. For the 2011 season, Green was moved to the outfield and played for the Double–A Midland RockHounds with a minor stint in the Triple–A playoffs. He made his MLB debut on July 8, 2013, starting at second base. He went 0-for-3 and struck out twice. He appeared in five games with the Athletics and did not record a hit.

=== Los Angeles Angels of Anaheim ===
Green was traded to the Los Angeles Angels of Anaheim on July 30, 2013, in exchange for Alberto Callaspo. Green tallied his first two major league hits in his Angels debut on August 6. During the 2014 season Green went to bat for the Angels 99 times, compiling a .273 batting average, 1 home run, and 11 RBI. During the 2015 season Green was shuffled between the Angels and their Triple–A affiliate Salt Lake Bees. In his most recent stint from July 19–24 he only had one at-bat, in which he flew out. He was optioned back to Salt Lake on July 24. Green was designated for assignment by the Angels on September 30. He cleared waivers and was sent outright to Triple–A Salt Lake on October 7.

=== San Francisco Giants ===
On November 30, 2015, Green signed a minor league deal with the Giants. Green began the 2016 season with the Sacramento River Cats of the Triple–A Pacific Coast League, and was promoted to the major leagues on June 30. The Giants designated him for assignment on July 28, and outrighted him to Sacramento.

=== Washington Nationals ===
On January 27, 2017, Green signed a minor league contract with the Washington Nationals. On April 12, after injuries to Trea Turner and Stephen Drew, the Nationals called up Green to the majors. He was designated for assignment on April 21. Green was released by the Nationals organization on June 14.

=== Chicago White Sox ===
On June 21, 2017, Green signed a minor league contract with the Chicago White Sox. In 28 appearances for the Triple-A Charlotte Knights, he batted .211/.287/.322 with one home run and 10 RBI. Green was released by the White Sox organization on August 7.

=== Miami Marlins ===
On August 18, 2017, Green signed a minor league contract with the Miami Marlins. In 14 games for the Triple–A New Orleans Baby Cakes, he batted .304/.340/.326 with no home runs and 8 RBI. Green elected free agency following the season on November 6.

=== Acereros de Monclova ===
On May 5, 2018, Green signed with the Acereros de Monclova of the Mexican League. In 16 appearances for Monclova, he slashed .281/.317/.333 with three RBI. Green was released by the Acereros on July 3.
