= Travis Buck =

American baseball player & coach (born 1983)

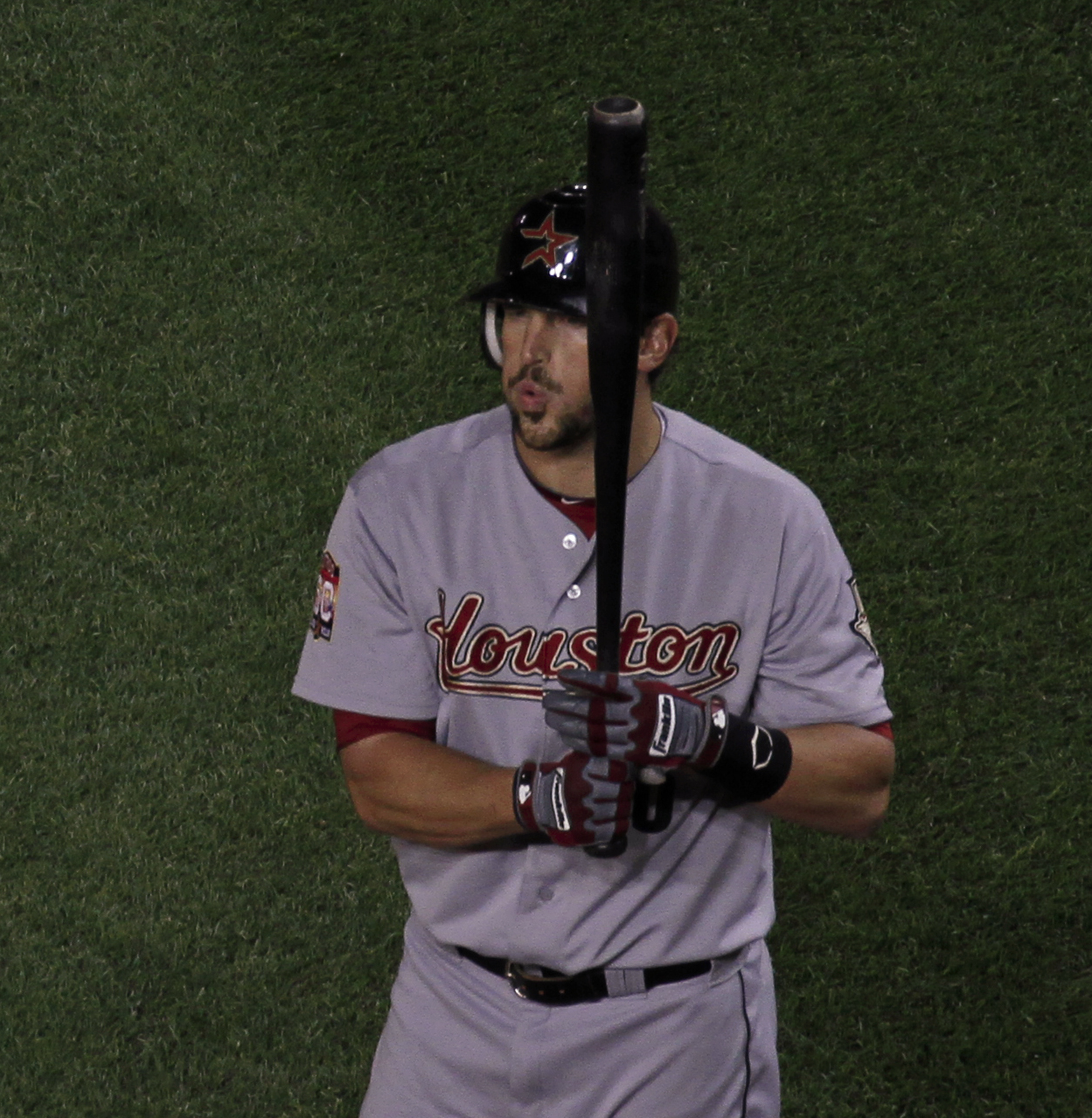
- Buck with the Houston Astros in April 2012
- Outfielder
- Born: November 18, 1983 (age 42); Richland, Washington, U.S.
- Batted: Left Threw: Right

MLB debut
- April 2, 2007, for the Oakland Athletics

Last MLB appearance
- May 28, 2012, for the Houston Astros

MLB statistics
- Batting average: .243
- Home runs: 20
- Runs batted in: 95
- Stats at Baseball Reference

Teams
- Oakland Athletics (2007–2010); Cleveland Indians (2011); Houston Astros (2012)
Medals
Representing United States
Men's baseball
World University Championship
Gold medal – first place	2004 Tainan	Team

Travis George Buck (born November 18, 1983) is an American baseball coach and former professional outfielder, who is an assistant for the University of Oregon in Eugene. He played in Major League Baseball (MLB) for the Oakland Athletics, Cleveland Indians, and Houston Astros, and was an assistant coach for Loyola Marymount University near Marina del Rey, California in Los Angeles.

== College career ==
Buck attended Richland High School in Richland, Washington before enrolling at Arizona State University in Tempe. He played college baseball for the Arizona State Sun Devils baseball team from 2003-2005. He is eighth in the ASU all-time hits category with 272, and his 110 hits in 2005 are the ninth-most in Sun Devils history. In 2004 and 2005, he was selected as a Pac-10 Conference All-Star outfielder, and in 2004 he helped lead Team USA to a gold medal in the World University Baseball Championship, finishing second on Team USA hitting .412 (28-for-68) with two doubles, two home runs and 14 RBI. He won the Pac-10 Player-of-the-week award in consecutive weeks in 2004, a feat that was not repeated by a Sun Devil until Ike Davis in 2007.

== Professional career ==
=== Oakland Athletics ===
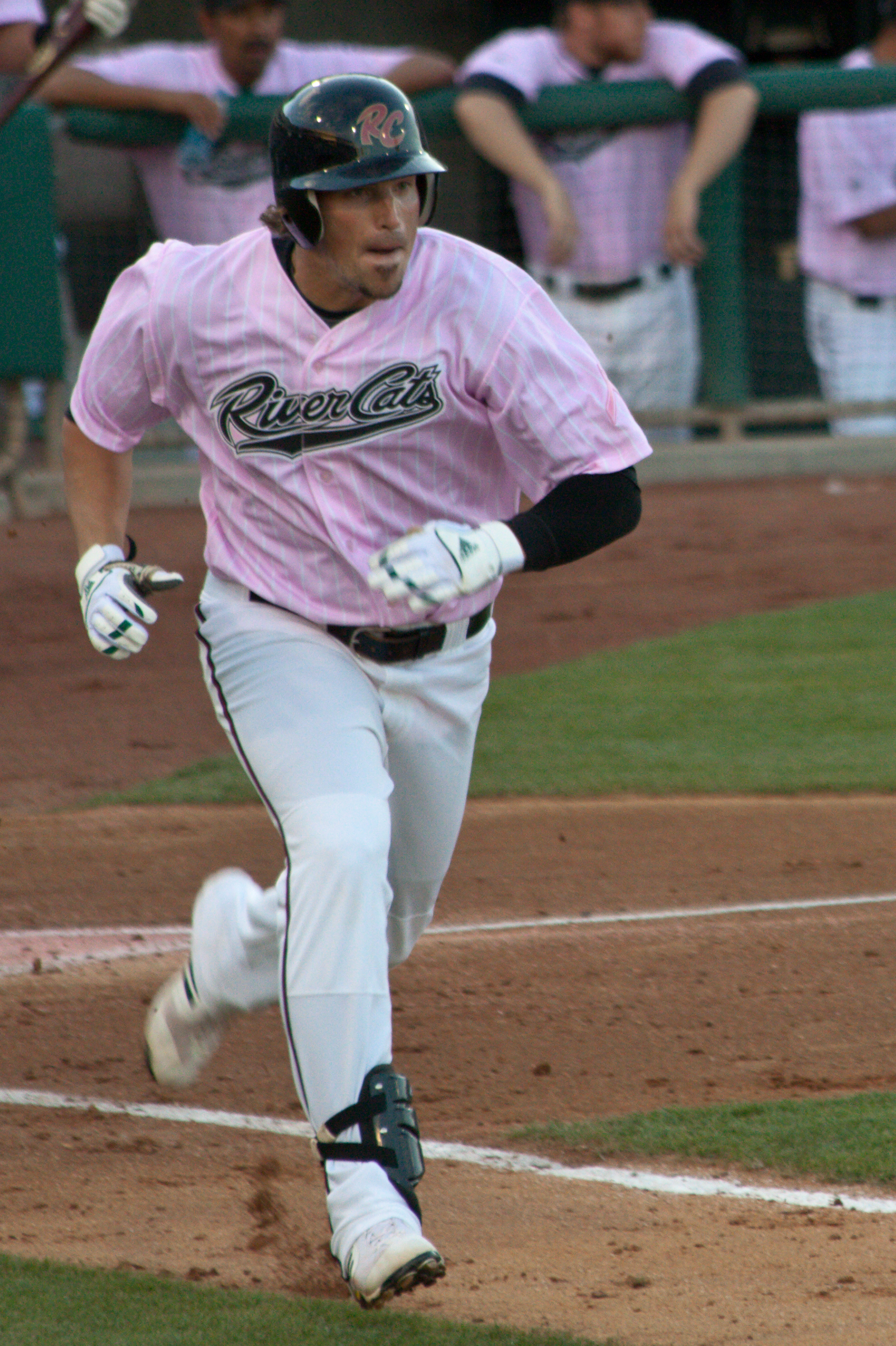
Buck playing for the Sacramento River Cats, Triple-A affiliates of the Oakland Athletics

He was selected by the Seattle Mariners in the 23rd round (700th overall) in the 2002 Major League Baseball draft, but opted not to sign with the Mariners so that he could attend Arizona State University. He was later drafted by the Athletics as the 36th overall selection of the 2005 Major League Baseball draft.

In 2006, Buck split time between High A (the Stockton Ports) and Double-A (the Midland RockHounds). He finished the year hitting .302 for Midland with four home runs in 212 at-bats. He was selected as an outfielder for the United States in the All-Star Futures Game at PNC Park in Pittsburgh.

Prior to 2007, Buck was rated as the top prospect in the Oakland organization and the #50 prospect in Major League Baseball by Baseball America. He was in the Opening Day lineup for Oakland due to an injury to first baseman Dan Johnson, which prompted manager Bob Geren to shift Nick Swisher to first base and tab Buck as the starting right fielder. Buck went 1-3 in the game, with his first major league hit being a double off Mariners starting pitcher Félix Hernández. Buck was the opening day right fielder for the Athletics in 2008, but spent much of the season at Triple-A Sacramento, before being recalled in September. On December 2, 2010, he was non-tendered by the Athletics making him a free agent.

=== Cleveland Indians ===
On December 20, 2010, Buck signed a minor league deal with the Cleveland Indians. He made their 2011 opening day roster, but was soon sent down to the Triple-A Columbus Clippers when Grady Sizemore was activated from the disabled list. However, when Sizemore returned to the disabled list in mid-May, Buck was recalled. Buck was designated for assignment on July 28. On October 6, 2011, he elected for free agency.

=== Houston Astros ===
The Houston Astros signed Buck to a minor league contract on November 9, 2012.

=== San Diego Padres ===
Buck played in the San Diego Padres organization in 2013. He became a free agent after the 2014 season.

== Coaching career ==
After ending his playing career, Buck opened a baseball training facility in Richland, Washington called TBuck Training. Buck was named the Boise State University Baseball director of player development and bench coach on August 20, 2018. On July 5, 2021, Buck joined the Arizona State staff as hitting coach. He became an assistant coach at Loyola Marymount prior to the 2024 season.

On June 3, 2025, Buck was announced as a coach for the United States national under-18 baseball team's development program in Cary, North Carolina. In fall 2025, he became director of baseball operations for the University of Oregon.
