= 2008 Oakland Athletics season =

2008 Oakland Athletics
- League: American League
- Division: West
- Ballpark: Oakland–Alameda County Coliseum
- City: Oakland, California
- Record: 75–86 (.466)
- Divisional place: 3rd
- Owners: Lewis Wolff
- General managers: Billy Beane
- Managers: Bob Geren
- Television: CSN Bay Area; KICU (Action 36)
- Radio: KYCY; KNTS/KDOW; KFRC-FM

The Oakland Athletics' 2008 season marked their 40th year in Oakland, California. It was also the 108th season in franchise history. The team finished third in the American League West with a record of 75–86.

The Athletics were not expected to contend for the American League West title in 2008. Despite this, the team remained near first place well into July. The Athletics fortunes peaked on July 11, when a 9–2 rout of the Angels allowed them to pull within four games of first place. The team then lost 44 of its 68 remaining games. The slide saw the Athletics finish 24.5 games behind the Angels, who clinched the division for a second consecutive year.

The Athletics struggled at the plate for most of the season. Particularly troubling was the team's lack of power hitting; apart from Jack Cust, who hit 33 home runs, no Athletic hit more than 13. Oakland ultimately finished 11th (out of 14 American League teams) in this category. All told, the Athletics scored fewer runs (646) than any other American League team in 2008.

== Off-season ==
=== Potential free agents ===
Outfielder Jeff DaVanon, catcher Mike Piazza and outfielder Shannon Stewart all filed for free agency after the 2007 season. DaVanon was signed to a minor league contract by the Athletics on August 10, 2007, after being let go by the Arizona Diamondbacks less than a week later. His contract was purchased on August 17, following an injury to Mark Kotsay, who was plagued with injuries in 2007. He posted a .238 batting average and no home runs in 26 games for the Athletics. Piazza was signed in the previous offseason to a one-year contract which began Piazza's career as a designated hitter. In early May, Piazza was placed on the disabled list after suffering an injury while sliding into third base against the Boston Red Sox. Piazza was activated from the disabled list on July 20 but saw limited action after that as Jack Cust, who the Athletics brought in as a replacement, put on a big show once he joined the team. Piazza played in a total of 83 games in 2007 and batted .275 with 8 home runs. Stewart was also signed in the previous offseason to a one-year contract after missing most of the 2006 season. Stewart played in 146 games in 2007 and led the team in batting average (.290).

=== October ===
- October 5: Outfielder Dee Brown, pitcher Ron Flores, infielder J. J. Furmaniak, pitcher Brad Halsey, pitcher Shane Komine, catcher Adam Melhuse and pitcher Jason Windsor were outrighted to the minor leagues. Brown, Flores, Furmaniak and Melhuse eventually declined their assignments and became free agents.
- October 6: The Athletics announced that they would not renew the contracts of bullpen coach Brad Fischer, third base coach Rene Lachemann, and bench coach Bob Schaefer for the 2008 season.
- October 11: Pitcher José García was claimed by the Athletics off waivers from the Florida Marlins. García had missed the entire 2007 season following Tommy John surgery.
- October 13: Pitcher Jay Marshall and outfielder Kevin Thompson were claimed off waivers by the Boston Red Sox and the Pittsburgh Pirates, respectively. A Rule 5 draft selection from the Chicago White Sox, Marshall saw action in 51 games in 2007, mainly as a left-handed specialist. He put up a 1–2 record and a 6.43 ERA. Claimed off waivers from the New York Yankees on September 7, 2007, Thompson played in 9 games for the Athletics in the final month of the season, batting .071 with no home runs.
- October 16: Ron Romanick was added to the Athletics coaching staff and will serve as the bullpen coach for the 2008 season.
- October 23: Don Wakamatsu was added to the Athletics coaching staff and will serve as the bench coach for the 2008 season.
- October 25: Outfielder Chris Snelling was claimed off waivers by the Tampa Bay Devil Rays. Acquired on May 2, 2007, from the Washington Nationals for Ryan Langerhans, Snelling played in just 6 games before being placed on the disabled list on May 16 and never played in another game for the Athletics. That same day Connor Robertson was outrighted to the minor leagues. Robertson appeared in 3 games in 2007 and posted an 18.00 ERA. Tony DeFrancesco was also added to the Athletics coaching staff and will serve as the third base coach for 2008.

=== November ===
- November 2: Pitcher Colby Lewis was claimed off waivers by the Kansas City Royals. Lewis mainly worked out of the bullpen for the Athletics in 2007, posting a 6.45 ERA and an 0–2 record in 26 games.
- November 18: Infielder Marco Scutaro was traded to the Toronto Blue Jays for two minor league pitchers, Graham Godfrey and Kristian Bell. Scutaro, a valuable backup infielder, played in 104 games in 2007 for the Athletics, posting a .260 batting average and 7 home runs.
- November 28: First baseman Wes Bankston was claimed off waivers by the Athletics from the Kansas City Royals. A minor league first baseman, Bankston played in the Tampa Bay Devil Rays minor league system in 2007. In 104 games in Triple-A with the Durham Bulls, he batted .238 with 15 home runs.

=== December ===
- December 6: Pitcher Fernando Hernández was selected from the Chicago White Sox in the Rule 5 draft. Jay Marshall was reclaimed by the Athletics off waivers from the Boston Red Sox. To make room for Marshall, José García was designated for assignment. Marshall was later outrighted to the minor leagues on December 11 and José García was not offered a new contract and became a free agent on December 12.
- December 13: The long-awaited Mitchell Report was released. It named many former Athletics players, including José Canseco, Jason Giambi, José Guillén, Jeremy Giambi, David Justice, Adam Piatt, F. P. Santangelo, Miguel Tejada and Randy Velarde. The report also named one current Athletics player, Jack Cust.
- December 14: In a move that signaled the start of rebuilding for the Athletics, 2007 All-Star Game starter Dan Haren along with minor league pitcher Connor Robertson were traded to the Arizona Diamondbacks for pitcher Brett Andreson, first baseman Chris Carter, outfielder Aaron Cunningham, pitcher Dana Eveland, outfielder Carlos González and pitcher Greg Smith. Haren, the Athletics ace in 2007, made 34 starts and posted career highs in wins (15), ERA (3.07), and strikeouts (192). Of the players acquired from the Diamondbacks, Eveland was the only one with major league experience, having made his debut for the Milwaukee Brewers in 2005. Eveland appeared in 5 games for the Diamondbacks in 2007, making one start, winning one game and posted a 14.40 ERA.

=== January ===
- January 3: In another move as part of the Athletics rebuilding mode, outfielder/first baseman Nick Swisher was traded to the Chicago White Sox for pitcher Fautino de los Santos, pitcher Gio González and outfielder Ryan Sweeney. In 2007, Swisher posted a career high .262 batting average but had only 22 home runs, a big drop from 35 in 2006. Of the players acquired from the White Sox, Sweeney was the only one with major league experience, having made his debut for them in 2006. In 15 major league games for the White Sox in 2007, Sweeney batted .200 with a home run.
- January 11: Outfielder Emil Brown was signed by the Athletics to a one-year contract. Brown, 33, started half the games for the Kansas City Royals in the outfield in 2007. He batted .257 with 6 home runs. According to Athletics assistant general manager David Forst, Brown's success against left-handed pitching was what appealed the Athletics into signing the right-handed veteran. To make room for Brown on the 40-man roster, fellow outfielder Danny Putnam was designated for assignment. Putnam made his debut in 2007 for the Athletics and batted .214 with a home run in 11 games.
- January 14: In another move as part of the Athletics rebuilding mode, center fielder Mark Kotsay was traded to the Atlanta Braves for pitcher Joey Devine and minor league pitcher Jamie Richmond. Kotsay was limited to just 56 games in 2007 due to back problems that bothered him in the past. He hit just .214 with a home run in those 56 games. Devine spent most of the 2007 season in the minor leagues, splitting time in Double-A and Triple-A. In 10 major league games, all out of the bullpen, Devine went 1–0 with a 1.08 ERA.
- January 25: Outfielder Jeff Fiorentino was claimed off waivers from the Cincinnati Reds. To make room for Fiorentino on the 40-man roster, pitcher Ruddy Lugo was designated for assignment. Fiorentino spent the entire 2007 season in the Baltimore Orioles organization, playing at the Double-A level for the Bowie Baysox. He hit .282 with 15 home runs and 65 RBIs for the Baysox. Lugo was claimed off waivers from the Tampa Bay Devil Rays earlier in the 2007 season and made a combined 38 relief appearances for the Devil Rays and the Athletics. He went 6–0 with a 5.40 ERA.

=== February ===
- February 8: Pitcher Keith Foulke came out of retirement and signed a one-year contract with the Athletics. He had previously pitched for the Athletics in 2003, as their closer. To make room for Foulke on the 40-man roster, Bankston was designated for assignment and was later outrighted to Triple-A Sacramento on February 13.

=== March ===
- March 25: First baseman and designated hitter Mike Sweeney had his contract purchased right before the Athletics first game. He had signed a minor league contract on February 11, 2008. He had previously spent his entire career with the Kansas City Royals and his last few years with them were plagued with injuries. Sweeney had done well in spring training to earn a spot on the Athletics 25-man roster.

== Regular season ==
=== Season standings ===
AL West
Team	W	L	Pct.	GB	Home	Road
Los Angeles Angels of Anaheim	100	62	.617	—	50‍–‍31	50‍–‍31
Texas Rangers	79	83	.488	21	40‍–‍41	39‍–‍42
Oakland Athletics	75	86	.466	24½	43‍–‍38	32‍–‍48
Seattle Mariners	61	101	.377	39	35‍–‍46	26‍–‍55

=== Record vs. opponents ===
2008 American League record Source: MLB Standings Grid – 2008
Team	BAL	BOS	CWS	CLE	DET	KC	LAA	MIN	NYY	OAK	SEA	TB	TEX	TOR	NL
Baltimore	–	6–12	4–5	4–4	4–3	5–3	3–6	3–3	7–11	0–5	8–2	3–15	4–5	6–12	11–7
Boston	12–6	–	4–3	5–1	5–2	6–1	1–8	4–3	9–9	6–4	6–3	8–10	9–1	9–9	11–7
Chicago	5–4	3–4	–	11–7	12–6	12–6	5–5	9–10	2–5	5–4	5–1	4–6	3–3	1–7	12–6
Cleveland	4–4	1–5	7–11	–	11–7	10–8	4–5	8–10	4–3	5–4	4–5	5–2	6–4	6–1	6–12
Detroit	3–4	2–5	6–12	7–11	–	7–11	3–6	7–11	4–2	3–6	7–3	3–4	6–3	3–5	13–5
Kansas City	3–5	1–6	6–12	8–10	11–7	–	2–3	6–12	5–5	6–3	7–2	3–5	2–7	2–5	13–5
Los Angeles	6–3	8–1	5–5	5–4	6–3	3–2	–	5–3	7–3	10–9	14–5	3–6	12–7	6–3	10–8
Minnesota	3–3	3–4	10–9	10–8	11–7	12–6	3–5	–	4–6	5–5	5–4	3–3	5–5	0–6	14–4
New York	11–7	9–9	5–2	3–4	2–4	5–5	3–7	6–4	–	5–1	7–2	11–7	3–4	9–9	10–8
Oakland	5–0	4–6	4–5	4–5	6–3	3–6	9–10	5–5	1–5	-	10–9	3–6	7–12	4–6	10–8
Seattle	2–8	3–6	1–5	5–4	3–7	2–7	5–14	4–5	2–7	9–10	–	3–4	8–11	5–4	9–9
Tampa Bay	15–3	10–8	6–4	2–5	4–3	5–3	6–3	3–3	7–11	6–3	4–3	–	6–3	11–7	12–6
Texas	5–4	1–9	3–3	4–6	3–6	7–2	7–12	5–5	4–3	12–7	11–8	3–6	–	4–4	10–8
Toronto	12–6	9–9	7–1	1–6	5–3	5–2	3–6	6–0	9–9	6–4	4–5	7–11	4–4	–	8–10

=== Season summary ===
==== March ====
The Athletics opened the regular season on March 25 in Japan and faced the Boston Red Sox there. Before the opener, the Athletics placed starting pitcher Chad Gaudin and third baseman Eric Chavez on the 15-day disabled list and placed relief pitcher Kiko Calero on the 60-day disabled list. The Athletics were allowed to carry 25 players plus three extra inactive players in case of injury. The three extra players were pitchers Justin Duchscherer and Dana Eveland along with outfielder Carlos González. The Athletics opened with ten pitchers, two catchers, seven infielders, five outfielders, and one designated hitter. The pitchers were Joe Blanton, Dallas Braden, Andrew Brown, Santiago Casilla, Lenny DiNardo, Alan Embree, Keith Foulke, Rich Harden, Fernando Hernández and Huston Street. Rob Bowen and Kurt Suzuki were the two catchers while Daric Barton, Bobby Crosby, Mark Ellis, Jack Hannahan, Dan Johnson, Donnie Murphy and Mike Sweeney were the seven infielders. The five outfielders were Emil Brown, Travis Buck, Chris Denorfia, Jeff Fiorentino and Ryan Sweeney, while Jack Cust was the designated hitter.

Joe Blanton got the nod to start the first game. The game went into extra innings and the Athletics lost 6–5 in 10. Emil Brown made a costly baserunning error in the 10th, which possibly cost the Athletics the game. Rich Harden started the second game of the two-game series and led the Athletics to a 5–1 win over the Red Sox after pitching six strong innings while giving up one run on three hits and also struck out nine.

=== Game log ===
2008 game log
March

#	Date	Opponent	Score	Win	Loss	Save	Attendance	Record
1	March 25	Red Sox*	6 – 5 (10)	Okajima (1–0)	Street (0–1)	Papelbon (1)	44,628	0–1
2	March 26	Red Sox*	5–1	Harden (1–0)	Lester (0–1)		44,735	1–1
* At Tokyo Dome in Tokyo, Japan, see MLB Japan Opening Series 2008

April

#	Date	Opponent	Score	Win	Loss	Save	Attendance	Record
3	April 1	Red Sox	2–1	Matsuzaka (1–0)	Blanton (0–1)	Papelbon (2)	36,067	1–2
4	April 2	Red Sox	5–0	Lester (1–1)	Embree (0–1)		21,625	1–3
5	April 4	Indians	6–3	Duchscherer (1–0)	Byrd (0–1)		13,916	2–3
6	April 5	Indians	6–1	Eveland (1–0)	Sabathia (0–1)		16,279	3–3
7	April 6	Indians	2–1	Lee (1–0)	Blanton (0–2)	Borowski (2)	16,384	3–4
8	April 8	@ Blue Jays	9–8	Embree (1–1)	Accardo (0–1)	Street (1)	31,336	4–4
9	April 9	@ Blue Jays	6–3	Hernández (1–0)	Accardo (0–2)	Street (2)	16,102	5–4
10	April 10	@ Blue Jays	11 – 8 (12)	Devine (1–0)	League (0–1)	Foulke (1)	16,521	6–4
11	April 11	@ Indians	9–7	Blanton (1–2)	Sabathia (0–2)	Street (3)	17,859	7–4
12	April 12	@ Indians	7–3	DiNardo (1–0)	Carmona (1–1)		19,170	8–4
13	April 13	@ Indians	7–1	Lee (2–0)	Gaudin (0–1)		17,228	8–5
14	April 14	@ White Sox	2–1	Smith (1–0)	Buehrle (1–1)	Street (4)	20,430	9–5
15	April 15	@ White Sox	4–1	Danks (1–1)	Eveland (1–1)	Jenks (5)	18,254	9–6
16	April 16	Mariners	4–2	Hernández (2–0)	Blanton (1–3)		21,126	9–7
17	April 17	Mariners	8–1	Silva (3–0)	DiNardo (1–1)		10,164	9–8
18	April 18	Royals	13–2	Gaudin (1–1)	Bannister (3–1)		12,528	10–8
19	April 19	Royals	6–5	Devine (2–0)	Peralta (0–1)	Street (5)	20,390	11–8
20	April 20	Royals	7–1	Eveland (2–1)	Hochevar (0–1)		18,645	12–8
21	April 22	Twins	5–4	Rincón (2–0)	Blanton (1–4)	Nathan (7)	10,267	12–9
22	April 23	Twins	3–0	Gaudin (2–1)	Bonser (1–4)	Street (6)	15,242	13–9
23	April 24	Twins	11–2	Smith (2–0)	Liriano (0–3)		12,593	14–9
24	April 25	@ Mariners	4–3	Eveland (3–1)	Batista (2–3)	Street (7)	40,845	15–9
25	April 26	@ Mariners	5–3	Bédard (2–0)	Duchscherer (1–1)		37,563	15–10
26	April 27	@ Mariners	4–2	Blanton (2–4)	Hernández (2–1)	Street (8)	32,612	16–10
27	April 28	@ Angels	14–2	Gaudin (3–1)	Garland (3–3)		37,725	17–10
28	April 29	@ Angels	2–0	Saunders (5–0)	Smith (2–1)	Rodríguez (11)	35,764	17–11
29	April 30	@ Angels	6–1	Santana (5–0)	Eveland (3–2)		35,301	17–12

May

#	Date	Opponent	Score	Win	Loss	Save	Attendance	Record
30	May 1	@ Angels	15–8	Duchscherer (2–1)	Moseley (1–3)		37,396	18–12
31	May 2	Rangers	4–3	Padilla (4–2)	Blanton (2–5)	Wilson (7)	15,408	18–13
32	May 3	Rangers	6–3	Murray (1–0)	Gaudin (3–2)	Benoit (1)	20,524	18–14
33	May 4	Rangers	3–1	Casilla (1–0)	Feldman (0–1)	Street (9)	31,673	19–14
34	May 5	Orioles	2 – 1 (10)	Devine (3–0)	Johnson (0–1)		10,128	20–14
35	May 6	Orioles	4–2	Duchscherer (3–1)	Burres (3–3)	Casilla (1)	11,492	21–14
36	May 7	Orioles	6 – 5 (10)	Braden (1–0)	Cormier (0–1)		15,235	22–14
37	May 9	@ Rangers	4–0	Feldman (1–1)	Smith (2–2)		23,516	22–15
38	May 10	@ Rangers	6–4	Rupe (1–1)	Eveland (3–3)		22,899	22–16
39	May 11	@ Rangers	12–6	Casilla (2–0)	Germán (1–1)		23,959	23–16
40	May 13	@ Indians	4–0	Byrd (2–3)	Duchscherer (3–2)	Kobayashi (1)	16,974	23–17
41	May 14	@ Indians	2–0	Sabathia (3–5)	Blanton (2–6)		18,188	23–18
42	May 15	@ Indians	4–2	Laffey (2–2)	Smith (2–3)	Kobayashi (2)	26,764	23–19
43	May 16	@ Braves	3–2	Acosta (2–1)	Embree (1–2)		31,004	23–20
44	May 17	@ Braves	5–4	Harden (2–0)	Hudson (6–3)		38,324	24–20
45	May 18	@ Braves	5–2	Reyes (2–1)	Duchscherer (3–3)		31,025	24–21
46	May 19	Rays	7 – 6 (13)	Hammel (3–2)	Gaudin (3–3)	Percival (12)	11,077	24–22
47	May 20	Rays	3–2	Kazmir (3–1)	Smith (2–4)	Percival (13)	11,272	24–23
48	May 21	Rays	9–1	Eveland (4–3)	Sonnanstine (6–2)		22,712	25–23
49	May 23	Red Sox	8–3	Harden (3–0)	Wakefield (3–3)		29,057	26–23
50	May 24	Red Sox	3–0	Duchscherer (4–3)	Beckett (5–4)	Street (10)	33,468	27–23
51	May 25	Red Sox	6–3	Blanton (3–6)	Lester (3–3)	Street (11)	35,067	28–23
52	May 27	Blue Jays	3–1	Smith (3–4)	Burnett (5–5)	Street (12)	10,635	29–23
53	May 28	Blue Jays	2–1	Halladay (6–5)	Foulke (0–1)	Ryan (12)	17,460	29–24
54	May 29	Blue Jays	12–0	Litsch (6–1)	Eveland (4–4)		21,862	29–25
55	May 30	@ Rangers	3–1	Millwood (3–3)	Duchscherer (4–4)	Wilson (11)	21,763	29–26
56	May 31	@ Rangers	8–4	Ponson (4–1)	Blanton (3–7)		36,798	29–27

June

#	Date	Opponent	Score	Win	Loss	Save	Attendance	Record
57	June 1	@ Rangers	13–8	Gaudin (4–3)	Wright (3–2)		17,661	30–27
58	June 2	Tigers	3–2	Street (1–1)	Cruceta (0–3)		11,772	31–27
59	June 3	Tigers	5 – 4 (11)	Gaudin (5–3)	Seay (0–1)		10,871	32–27
60	June 4	Tigers	10–2	Duchscherer (5–4)	Robertson (3–6)		19,258	33–27
61	June 6	Angels	3–1	Lackey (2–1)	Blanton (3–8)	Rodríguez (25)	25,120	33–28
62	June 7	Angels	5–3	Garland (6–3)	Smith (3–5)	Rodríguez (26)	29,294	33–29
63	June 8	Angels	7 – 3 (12)	Ziegler (1–0)	Bootcheck (0–1)		26,332	34–29
64	June 10	Yankees	3–1	Wang (7–2)	Eveland (4–5)	Rivera (17)	26,402	34–30
65	June 11	Yankees	8–4	Duchscherer (6–4)	Rasner (3–4)		27,292	35–30
66	June 12	Yankees	4–1	Pettitte (6–5)	Blanton (3–9)	Rivera (18)	28,658	35–31
67	June 13	@ Giants	5–1	Smith (4–5)	Zito (2–10)		42,445	36–31
68	June 14	@ Giants	4–0	Harden (4–0)	Cain (3–5)		40,873	37–31
69	June 15	@ Giants	5–3	Eveland (5–5)	Correia (1–4)	Street (13)	41,547	38–31
70	June 17	@ D-backs	15–1	Duchscherer (7–4)	Webb (11–3)		28,710	39–31
71	June 18	@ D-backs	11–1	Haren (7–4)	Blanton (3–10)		28,507	39–32
72	June 19	@ D-backs	2–1	Peña (1–1)	Foulke (0–2)	Lyon (15)	31,997	39–33
73	June 20	Marlins	7 – 6 (11)	Brown (1–0)	Waechter (0–2)		15,035	40–33
74	June 21	Marlins	6–4	Pinto (2–2)	Street (1–2)	Gregg (13)	19,287	40–34
75	June 22	Marlins	7–1	Duchscherer (8–4)	Miller (5–6)		22,461	41–34
76	June 24	Phillies	5–2	Blanton (4–10)	Moyer (7–5)	Street (14)	13,348	42–34
77	June 25	Phillies	4–0	Kendrick (7–3)	Smith (4–6)		22,231	42–35
78	June 26	Phillies	5–0	Harden (5–0)	Eaton (2–6)		17,228	43–35
79	June 27	Giants	4–1	Eveland (6–5)	Yabu (3–4)	Street (15)	27,125	44–35
80	June 28	Giants	1–0	Lincecum (9–1)	Duchscherer (8–5)	Wilson (22)	36,067	44–36
81	June 29	Giants	11–1	Sánchez (8–4)	Blanton (4–11)		33,841	44–37
82	June 30	@ Angels	6–1	Smith (5–6)	Garland (7–5)		42,046	45–37

July

#	Date	Opponent	Score	Win	Loss	Save	Attendance	Record
83	July 1	@ Angels	5–3	Shields (4–2)	Embree (1–3)	Rodríguez (33)	42,047	45–38
84	July 2	@ Angels	7–4	Saunders (12–4)	Foulke (0–3)	Rodríguez (34)	41,091	45–39
85	July 3	@ White Sox	3–2	Duchscherer (9–5)	Vázquez (7–7)	Street (16)	26,730	46–39
86	July 4	@ White Sox	7–1	Blanton (5–11)	Buehrle (6–7)		29,600	47–39
87	July 5	@ White Sox	6–1	Floyd (10–4)	Smith (5–7)		35,586	47–40
88	July 6	@ White Sox	4–3	Danks (6–4)	Harden (5–1)	Linebrink (1)	31,955	47–41
89	July 7	Mariners	4–3	Eveland (7–5)	Washburn (4–8)	Street (17)	11,129	48–41
90	July 8	Mariners	2–0	Duchscherer (10–5)	Silva (4–11)		12,543	49–41
91	July 9	Mariners	6–4	Corcoran (1–0)	Blanton (5–12)	Morrow (8)	21,128	49–42
92	July 10	Mariners	3 – 2 (11)	Street (2–2)	Jiménez (0–1)		15,187	50–42
93	July 11	Angels	9–2	Gallagher (1–0)	Garland (8–6)		31,372	51–42
94	July 12	Angels	4–1	Santana (11–3)	Eveland (7–6)	Rodríguez (37)	27,161	51–43
95	July 13	Angels	4–3	Arredondo (3–0)	Street (2–3)	Rodríguez (38)	29,352	51–44
96	July 18	@ Yankees	7–1	Mussina (12–6)	Smith (5–8)		54,145	51–45
97	July 19	@ Yankees	4 – 3 (12)	Robertson (1–0)	DiNardo (1–2)		54,183	51–46
98	July 20	@ Yankees	2–1	Pettitte (11–7)	Duchscherer (10–6)	Rivera (24)	54,366	51–47
99	July 21	@ Rays	4–0	Kazmir (8–5)	Eveland (7–7)		12,428	51–48
100	July 22	@ Rays	8–1	Braden (2–0)	Sonnanstine (10–5)		16,800	52–48
101	July 23	@ Rays	4–3	Shields (9–6)	Smith (5–9)	Percival (20)	23,437	52–49
102	July 25	Rangers	14–6	Padilla (12–5)	Blevins (0–1)		20,141	52–50
103	July 26	Rangers	9–4	Harrison (2–1)	Duchscherer (10–7)		20,653	52–51
104	July 27	Rangers	6–5	Blevins (1–1)	Hurley (1–2)	Street (18)	21,135	53–51
105	July 28	Royals	4–2	Greinke (8–7)	Braden (2–1)	Soria (28)	12,464	53–52
106	July 29	Royals	5–2	Meche (9–9)	Smith (5–10)	Soria (29)	12,182	53–53
107	July 30	Royals	4 – 3 (10)	R. Ramírez (2–1)	Street (2–4)	Soria (30)	26,272	53–54

August

#	Date	Opponent	Score	Win	Loss	Save	Attendance	Record
108	August 1	@ Red Sox	2 – 1 (12)	Timlin (4–3)	Embree (1–4)		37,832	53–55
109	August 2	@ Red Sox	12–2	Lester (10–3)	Eveland (7–8)		37,838	53–56
110	August 3	@ Red Sox	5–2	Matsuzaka (12–2)	Braden (2–2)	Papelbon (31)	37,317	53–57
111	August 4	@ Blue Jays	6–1	Halladay (13–8)	Gallagher (1–1)		24,761	53–58
112	August 5	@ Blue Jays	4–3	Carlson (4–1)	Street (2–5)		23,580	53–59
113	August 6	@ Blue Jays	5–1	Marcum (6–5)	Gonzalez (0–1)		29,256	53–60
114	August 7	@ Blue Jays	6–4	Burnett (14–9)	Blevins (1–2)	Ryan (22)	28,821	53–61
115	August 8	@ Tigers	4–2	Braden (3–2)	Rogers (8–9)	Ziegler (1)	41,457	54–61
116	August 9	@ Tigers	10–2	Galarraga (10–4)	Meyer (0–1)		41,308	54–62
117	August 10	@ Tigers	6–1	Robertson (7–8)	Smith (5–11)	Rodney (3)	40,743	54–63
118	August 12	Rays	2–1	Gonzalez (1–1)	Kazmir (8–6)	Ziegler (2)	14,284	55–63
119	August 13	Rays	3–2	Sonnanstine (12–6)	Duchscherer (10–8)	Percival (27)	21,438	55–64
120	August 14	Rays	7 – 6 (12)	Hammel (4–3)	Casilla (2–1)	Miller (1)	16,689	55–65
121	August 15	White Sox	6–4	Street (3–5)	H. Ramírez (0–1)		19,405	56–65
122	August 16	White Sox	2–1	Danks (10–5)	Smith (5–12)	Jenks (25)	22,206	56–66
123	August 17	White Sox	13–1	Vázquez (10–10)	Gonzalez (1–2)		28,843	56–67
124	August 18	@ Twins	3–2	Saarloos (1–0)	Blackburn (9–7)	Ziegler (3)	25,024	57–67
125	August 19	@ Twins	13–2	Slowey (10–8)	Gallagher (1–2)		35,256	57–68
126	August 20	@ Twins	3–1	Liriano (4–3)	Braden (3–3)	Nathan (34)	30,888	57–69
127	August 21	@ Mariners	2–0	Smith (6–12)	Rowland-Smith (2–2)	Ziegler (4)	25,611	58–69
128	August 22	@ Mariners	7–5	Corcoran (4–0)	Blevins (1–3)	Putz (8)	26,603	58–70
129	August 23	@ Mariners	5–1	Eveland (8–8)	Washburn (5–14)		34,145	59–70
130	August 24	@ Mariners	8–4	Hernández (8–8)	Meyer (0–2)	Putz (9)	28,731	59–71
131	August 25	@ Angels	2–1	Braden (4–3)	Weaver (10–10)	Ziegler (5)	39,584	60–71
132	August 26	@ Angels	5–1	Lackey (11–2)	Smith (6–13)		37,431	60–72
133	August 27	@ Angels	6–5	Street (4–5)	Saunders (14–7)	Ziegler (6)	38,587	61–72
134	August 28	Twins	3–2	Devine (4–0)	Breslow (0–2)		12,357	62–72
135	August 29	Twins	12–2	Slowey (11–8)	Meyer (0–3)	Breslow (1)	22,355	62–73
136	August 30	Twins	3–2	Street (5–5)	Nathan (0–1)		25,238	63–73
137	August 31	Twins	12–4	Baker (8–4)	Smith (6–14)		18,427	63–74

September

#	Date	Opponent	Score	Win	Loss	Save	Attendance	Record
138	September 2	@ Royals	5–2	Greinke (10–9)	Gonzalez (1–3)	Soria (34)	11,143	63–75
—	September 3	@ Royals	Postponed (rain) Rescheduled for September 4					
139	September 4	@ Royals	5 – 4 (10)	Soria (2–3)	Devine (4–1)		—	63–76
140	September 4	@ Royals	9–6	Davies (6–6)	Meyer (0–4)	R. Ramírez (1)	12,791	63–77
141	September 5	@ Orioles	11–2	Braden (5–3)	Waters (2–2)		14,984	64–77
—	September 6	@ Orioles	Canceled (rain)					
142	September 6	@ Orioles	5–1	Smith (7–14)	Cabrera (8–9)		21,553	65–77
143	September 8	@ Tigers	14–8	Fossum (3–1)	Gonzalez (1–4)		37,981	65–78
144	September 9	@ Tigers	3 -2	Devine (5–1)	Rodney (0–5)	Ziegler (7)	37,240	66–78
145	September 10	@ Tigers	5–2	Street (6–5)	Galarraga (12–6)	Ziegler (8)	37,194	67–78
146	September 11	Rangers	6–1	Nippert (3–4)	Braden (5–4)		10,566	67–79
147	September 12	Rangers	7–0	Harrison (8–3)	Smith (7–15)		15,117	67–80
148	September 13	Rangers	7–1	Outman (1–0)	Feldman (5–7)		21,102	68–80
149	September 14	Rangers	7–4	Devine (6–1)	Madrigal (0–2)	Ziegler (9)	18,551	69–80
150	September 16	Angels	8–1	Gallagher (5–6)	Lackey (11–4)		14,325	70–80
151	September 17	Angels	3–2	Ziegler (2–0)	Rodríguez (2–3)		20,102	71–80
152	September 18	Angels	6–4	Saunders (16–7)	Outman (1–1)	Rodríguez (59)	12,645	71–81
153	September 19	Mariners	2–0	Eveland (9–8)	Hernández (9–11)	Ziegler (10)	30,149	72–81
154	September 20	Mariners	8–7	Street (7–5)	Thomas (0–1)	Ziegler (11)	18,756	73–81
155	September 21	Mariners	5–3	Ziegler (3–0)	Batista (4–14)	Devine (1)	18,707	74–81
156	September 22	@ Rangers	4 – 3 (11)	Embree (2–4)	Mendoza (3–8)	Casilla (2)	14,925	75–81
157	September 23	@ Rangers	6–4	Wright (8–7)	Embree (2–5)	Francisco (5)	18,408	75–82
158	September 24	@ Rangers	14–4	Harrison (9–3)	Eveland (9–9)		16,832	75–83
159	September 26	@ Mariners	10–8	Morrow (3–4)	Gallagher (5–7)	Corcoran (3)	24,662	75–84
160	September 27	@ Mariners	7–3	Rowland-Smith (5–3)	Smith (7–16)	Green (1)	24,440	75–85
161	September 28	@ Mariners	4–3	Dickey (5–8)	Outman (1–2)	Putz (15)	27,110	75–86

=== Notable games ===
- March 25, 2008 – As the 'home' team, in the Tokyo Dome, Japan, vs. the Boston Red Sox.
- March 26, 2008 – Second game at the Tokyo Dome, Japan.

== Player stats ==
=== Batting ===
Note: G = Games played; AB = At bats; R = Runs scored; H = Hits; Avg. = Batting average; HR = Home runs; RBI = Runs batted in; BB = Walks; SO = Strikeouts; SB = Stolen bases; OBP = On-base percentage; SLG = Slugging percentage

Player	G	AB	R	H	Avg.	HR	RBI	BB	SO	SB	OBP	SLG
Jeff Baisley	14	43	1	11	.256	0	5	4	7	0	.319	.279
Wes Bankston	17	59	4	12	.203	1	4	2	15	0	.238	.305
Daric Barton	140	446	59	101	.226	9	47	65	99	2	.327	.348
Rob Bowen	37	91	6	16	.176	1	9	4	38	0	.219	.286
Emil Brown	117	402	48	98	.244	13	59	27	65	4	.297	.386
Travis Buck	38	155	16	35	.226	7	25	11	38	1	.291	.432
Eric Chavez	23	89	10	22	.247	2	14	6	18	0	.295	.393
Brooks Conrad	6	19	0	3	.158	0	2	0	9	0	.158	.211
Bobby Crosby	145	556	66	132	.237	7	61	47	96	7	.296	.349
Aaron Cunningham	22	80	7	20	.250	1	14	6	24	2	.310	.400
Jack Cust	148	481	77	111	.231	33	77	111	197	0	.375	.476
Rajai Davis	101	196	28	51	.260	3	19	7	34	25	.288	.372
Chris Denorfia	29	62	10	18	.290	1	9	6	16	2	.362	.387
Mark Ellis	117	442	55	103	.233	12	41	53	65	14	.321	.373
Jeff Fiorentino	2	1	0	1	1.000	0	1	0	0	0	1.000	1.000
Carlos González	85	302	31	73	.242	4	26	13	81	4	.273	.361
Jack Hannahan	143	436	48	95	.218	9	47	55	131	2	.305	.342
Dan Johnson	1	1	0	0	.000	0	0	0	0	0	.000	.000
Donnie Murphy	46	103	10	19	.184	3	13	11	38	2	.274	.301
Matt Murton	9	30	1	3	.100	0	2	1	7	0	.129	.133
Eric Patterson	30	92	11	16	.174	0	8	12	24	8	.269	.207
Cliff Pennington	36	99	14	24	.242	0	9	13	18	4	.339	.293
Gregorio Petit	14	23	4	8	.348	0	0	2	9	0	.400	.435
Kurt Suzuki	148	530	54	148	.279	7	42	44	69	2	.346	.370
Mike Sweeney	42	126	13	36	.286	2	12	7	6	0	.331	.397
Ryan Sweeney	115	384	53	110	.286	5	45	38	67	9	.350	.383
Frank Thomas	55	186	20	49	.263	5	19	28	44	0	.364	.387
Joe Blanton	1	1	0	0	.000	0	0	0	1	0	.000	.000
Justin Duchscherer	2	6	0	0	.000	0	0	0	6	0	.000	.000
Dana Eveland	2	4	0	1	.250	0	0	1	2	0	.400	.250
Rich Harden	2	4	0	1	.250	0	0	0	1	0	.250	.250
Greg Smith	2	2	0	1	.500	0	0	0	1	0	.500	.500
Team totals	161	5451	646	1318	.242	125	610	574	1226	88	.318	.369

=== Starting pitchers ===
Note: G = Games pitched; GS = Games started; IP = Innings pitched; W = Wins; L = Losses; ERA = Earned run average; BB= Walks; SO = Strikeouts

Player	G	GS	IP	W	L	ERA	BB	SO
Joe Blanton	20	20	127.0	5	12	4.96	35	62
Dallas Braden	19	10	71.2	5	4	4.14	25	41
Justin Duchscherer	22	22	141.2	10	8	2.54	34	95
Dana Eveland	29	29	168.0	9	9	4.34	77	118
Sean Gallagher	11	11	56.2	2	3	5.88	36	54
Gio González	10	7	34.0	1	4	7.68	25	34
Rich Harden	13	13	77.0	5	1	2.34	31	92
Josh Outman	6	4	25.2	1	2	4.56	8	19
Greg Smith	32	32	190.1	7	16	4.16	87	111

=== Relief pitchers ===
Note: G = Games pitched; GS = Games started; IP = Innings pitched; W = Wins; L = Losses; SV = Saves; ERA = Earned run average; BB = Walks allowed; SO = Strikeouts

Player	G	GS	IP	W	L	SV	ERA	BB	SO
Jerry Blevins	36	0	37.2	1	3	0	3.11	13	35
Andrew Brown	31	0	35.0	1	0	0	3.09	21	28
Kiko Calero	5	0	4.2	0	0	0	3.86	3	7
Santiago Casilla	51	0	50.1	2	1	2	3.93	20	43
Joey Devine	42	0	45.2	6	1	1	0.59	15	49
Lenny DiNardo	11	2	23.0	1	2	0	7.43	13	12
Alan Embree	70	0	61.2	2	5	0	4.96	30	57
Keith Foulke	31	0	31.0	0	3	1	4.06	13	23
Chad Gaudin	26	6	62.2	5	3	0	3.59	17	44
Jeff Gray	5	0	4.2	0	0	0	7.71	1	4
Fernando Hernández	3	0	3.0	1	0	0	18.00	5	2
Dan Meyer	11	4	27.2	0	4	0	7.48	14	20
Kirk Saarloos	8	1	26.1	1	0	0	5.47	4	12
Huston Street	63	0	70.0	7	5	18	3.73	27	69
Brad Ziegler	47	0	59.2	3	0	11	1.06	22	30
Team Pitching Totals	161	161	1435.0	75	86	33	4.01	576	1061

=== Roster ===
2008 Oakland Athletics
Roster
Pitchers: 55 Joe Blanton; 13 Jerry Blevins; 51 Dallas Braden; 59 Andrew Brown; 50 Kiko Calero; 44 Santiago Casilla; 33 Joey Devine; 25 Lenny DiNardo; 58 Justin Duchscherer; 41 Alan Embree; 35,30 Dana Eveland; 29 Keith Foulke; 36 Sean Gallagher; 57 Chad Gaudin; 47 Gio González; 60 Jeff Gray; 40 Rich Harden; 56 Fernando Hernández; 53 Dan Meyer; 55 Josh Outman; 23 Greg Smith; 20 Huston Street; 31 Brad Ziegler	Catchers: 18 Rob Bowen; 24 Kurt Suzuki; Infielders: 52 Jeff Baisley; 45 Wes Bankston; 10 Daric Barton; 3 Eric Chavez; 62 Brooks Conrad; 7 Bobby Crosby; 14 Mark Ellis; 22 Jack Hannahan; 12 Donnie Murphy; 4 Eric Patterson; 56 Cliff Pennington; 2 Gregorio Petit; 5 Mike Sweeney	Outfielders: 8 Emil Brown; 6 Travis Buck; 57 Aaron Cunningham; 32 Jack Cust; 38 Rajai Davis; 19 Chris Denorfia; 67 Jeff Fiorentino; 28 Carlos González; 26 Matt Murton; 15 Ryan Sweeney; Other batters: 29 Dan Johnson; 35 Frank Thomas	Manager: 17 Bob Geren; Coaches: 11 Tony DeFrancesco (third base); 37 Ron Romanick (bullpen); 39 Ty Van Burkleo (hitting); 16 Don Wakamatsu (bench); 46 Tye Waller (first base); 48 Curt Young (pitching)

== Farm system ==
Level	Team	League	Manager
AAA	Sacramento River Cats	Pacific Coast League	Todd Steverson
AA	Midland RockHounds	Texas League	Webster Garrison
A	Stockton Ports	California League	Darren Bush
A	Kane County Cougars	Midwest League	Aaron Nieckula
A-Short Season	Vancouver Canadians	Northwest League	Rick Magnante
Rookie	AZL Athletics	Arizona League	Ruben Escalera

LEAGUE CHAMPIONS: Sacramento, Stockton
