= Brett Anderson (baseball) =

American baseball player (born 1988)

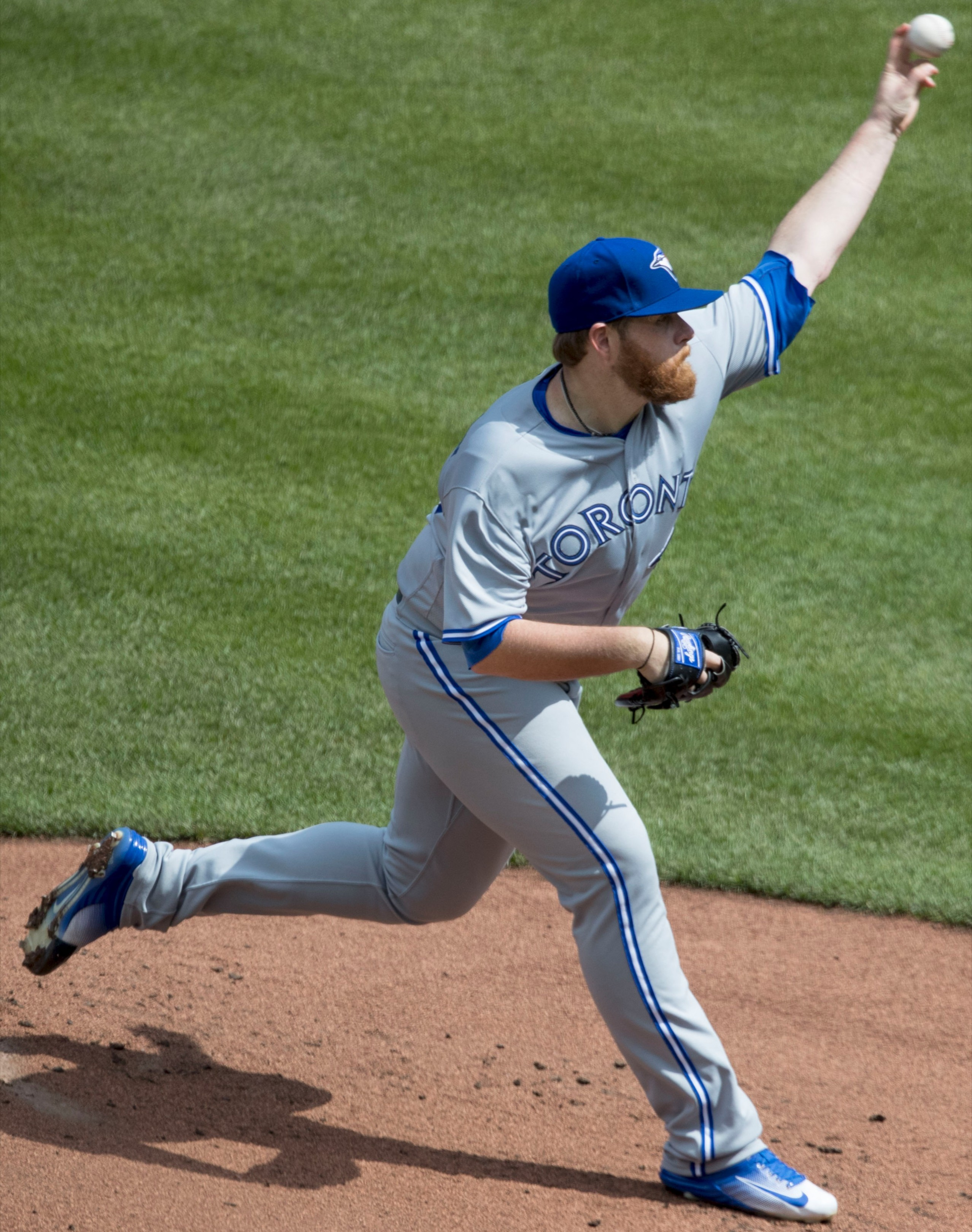
- Anderson in 2017 with the Toronto Blue Jays
- Pitcher
- Born: February 1, 1988 (age 37); Midland, Texas, U.S.
- Batted: Left Threw: Left

MLB debut
- April 10, 2009, for the Oakland Athletics

Last MLB appearance
- October 3, 2021, for the Milwaukee Brewers

MLB statistics
- Win–loss record: 67–74
- Earned run average: 4.07
- Strikeouts: 772
- Stats at Baseball Reference

Teams
- Oakland Athletics (2009–2013); Colorado Rockies (2014); Los Angeles Dodgers (2015–2016); Chicago Cubs (2017); Toronto Blue Jays (2017); Oakland Athletics (2018–2019); Milwaukee Brewers (2020–2021)
Medals
Men's baseball
Representing United States
Olympic Games
Bronze medal – third place	2008 Beijing	Team

Brett Franklin Anderson (born February 1, 1988) is an American former professional baseball pitcher. He played in Major League Baseball (MLB) from 2009 to 2021 for the Oakland Athletics, Colorado Rockies, Los Angeles Dodgers, Chicago Cubs, Toronto Blue Jays, and Milwaukee Brewers.

== Early life ==
Anderson attended Stillwater High School in Stillwater, Oklahoma, where he was an all-state selection in 2006, his senior year. He had a 9–0 win–loss record that season with a 0.37 earned run average ERA, 102 strikeouts and only nine walks in 57 1/3 innings pitched. He played in the Connie Mack World Series with his amateur team after both his junior and senior seasons and in the 2005 AFLAC High School All-American Game, where he was the winning pitcher. He also played for the US National 18-and-under team alongside Clayton Kershaw and Shawn Tolleson.

Anderson's career numbers at Stillwater were 22–8 with eight saves, 276 strikeouts and an 0.90 ERA. He signed a letter of intent to play for Oklahoma State University where his father, Frank Anderson, was the head coach.

== Professional career ==
=== Arizona Diamondbacks ===
Baseball America rated Anderson as having the best command of any high school prospect heading into the 2006 Major League Baseball draft. and was selected by the Arizona Diamondbacks in the second round. He was torn between signing and playing for his dad at Oklahoma State. He said that playing at OSU "would be awesome. It'd be fun to play with my buddies. I'm torn." He also said that part of him wanted to prove that he should have been a first round pick. Nevertheless, he agreed to a contract with the Diamondbacks that included a signing bonus of $950,000 with an additional $80,000 to continue his education if he wanted to. The contract was finalized on September 1, 2006.

Anderson made his professional debut on April 5, 2007, as the starting pitcher for the South Bend Silver Hawks of the Midwest League, in a game against the Great Lakes Loons, whose starting pitcher was former and future teammate Clayton Kershaw. He was 8–4 with a 2.21 ERA in 14 starts for the Silver Hawks and was selected to the Midwest League mid-season All-Star team. On June 21, 2007, Anderson was promoted by the Diamondbacks organization to the Visalia Oaks in the Advanced-Class A California League. On August 8, Anderson and several other Visalia players were involved in a car accident while en route to an amusement park, forcing the postponement of that night's game. Anderson sustained only a mild concussion but one of his teammates fractured his skull. He pitched in nine games for the Oaks with a 3–3 record and 4.85 ERA while missing some time due to some elbow tenderness.

=== Oakland Athletics ===
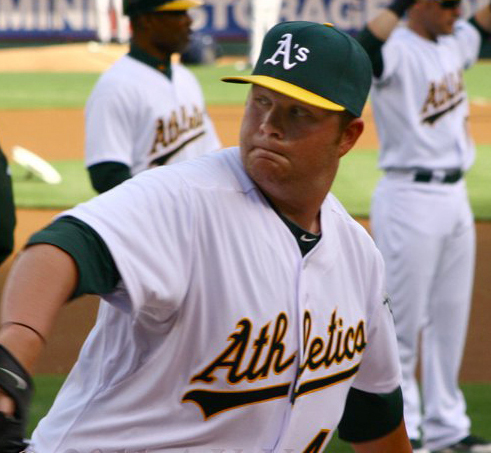
Anderson with the Oakland Athletics.

On December 14, 2007, he was traded by the Diamondbacks with Dana Eveland, Greg Smith, Aaron Cunningham, Carlos González and Chris Carter to the Oakland Athletics for Dan Haren and Connor Robertson.

In 2008, Anderson was a combined 11–5 with a 3.69 ERA and 118 strikeouts in 20 games (19 starts) between the Stockton Ports in the California League and the Double-A Midland RockHounds of the Texas League. In his debut for Midland, he struck out 12 batters and gave up two runs in six innings for the win. He was selected to pitch in the All-Star Futures Game played at Yankee Stadium during the All-Star break and was named to the U.S. Olympic Team in Beijing. He pitched seven innings to collect the win in the bronze medal game against Japan.

Anderson was a highly touted young prospect; in 2008 he was ranked as the 36th-best prospect in the Major Leagues, and in 2009 he was ranked the top prospect in Oakland's system and the #7 prospect overall by Baseball America.

Anderson was promoted to the Athletics as part of their opening day roster for 2009 and made his Major League debut on April 10, 2009, against the Seattle Mariners, allowing five runs in six innings to take the loss. He picked up his first career MLB win when he allowed only two earned runs in six innings against the Tampa Bay Rays on May 20. On July 6, he pitched a shutout against the Boston Red Sox striking out 9 batters, a career high. It was his first career shutout, and his first career complete game.

On September 24, 2009, Anderson broke the Oakland Athletics single-season rookie strikeout record (previously set by Rick Langford in 1977), while racking up 6 strikeouts in 5 2/3 innings versus the Texas Rangers. He finished the 2009 season with an 11–11 record, posting a 4.06 ERA. He led the team in wins (11) and shutouts (1) and tied with Brett Tomko in strikeouts (150).

The Athletics signed Anderson to a four-year, $12.5 million, contract extension at the start of the 2010 season, which he began by throwing six shutout innings against the Mariners. He allowed 3 hits, struck out 4 and walked 1, getting the win. In 19 starts in 2010 he went 7–6 with a 2.80 ERA. In 2011, after a June 5 outing, he was placed on the disabled list, eventually undergoing Tommy John surgery which required 13 months of rehabilitation. In 13 starts before the injury he was 3–6 with a 4.00 ERA.

Anderson returned on August 21, 2012, for the Athletics, allowing one run in seven innings for a win against the Minnesota Twins. However, he suffered an oblique strain during a start against the Detroit Tigers toward the 4th inning and was later pulled out, taking the loss. He spent the remainder of the 2012 season on the disabled list with the injury, and had a 4–2 record in six starts that season. Despite his limited action during the regular season, the Athletics put him on the playoff roster for the 2012 American League Division Series against the Detroit Tigers. Anderson pitched six scoreless innings in a 2–0 victory in game three to keep the Athletics alive, though they eventually lost the series in five games.

On February 28, 2013, Anderson was named Opening Day starter for the A's for the 2013 season. He went up against Mariners ace Félix Hernández and came away with the loss. He left his start on April 19 with what was called a sprained ankle but was later determined to be a stress fracture in his right foot. He originally hoped to return to the rotation in July, but the injury was more serious than previously thought and he was placed on the 60-day disabled list. He was eventually activated from the disabled list on August 28, at which the Athletics chose to use him out of the bullpen through the rest of the season. He appeared in 16 games that season, only five of which were starts and was 1–4 with a 6.04 ERA. He also appeared in relief in game four of the 2013 American League Division Series against the Tigers, allowing the two winning runs to score on a walk, wild pitch and double.

=== Colorado Rockies ===
On December 10, 2013, Anderson was traded to the Colorado Rockies for pitcher Drew Pomeranz and minor league pitcher Chris Jensen. In just his third start of the season, on April 12, 2014, Anderson broke his index finger while batting, sending him again to the disabled list. He rejoined the Rockies rotation in July and he pitched well for them for the next month. However, on August 5, he had to leave his start early due to back spasms He wound up undergoing season-ending back surgery to repair a herniated disc in his lower back. He made only eight starts for the Rockies in that injury riddled season, with a 1–3 record and a 2.91 ERA. After the season, the Rockies declined Anderson's $12 million option for 2015, making him a free agent.

=== Los Angeles Dodgers ===
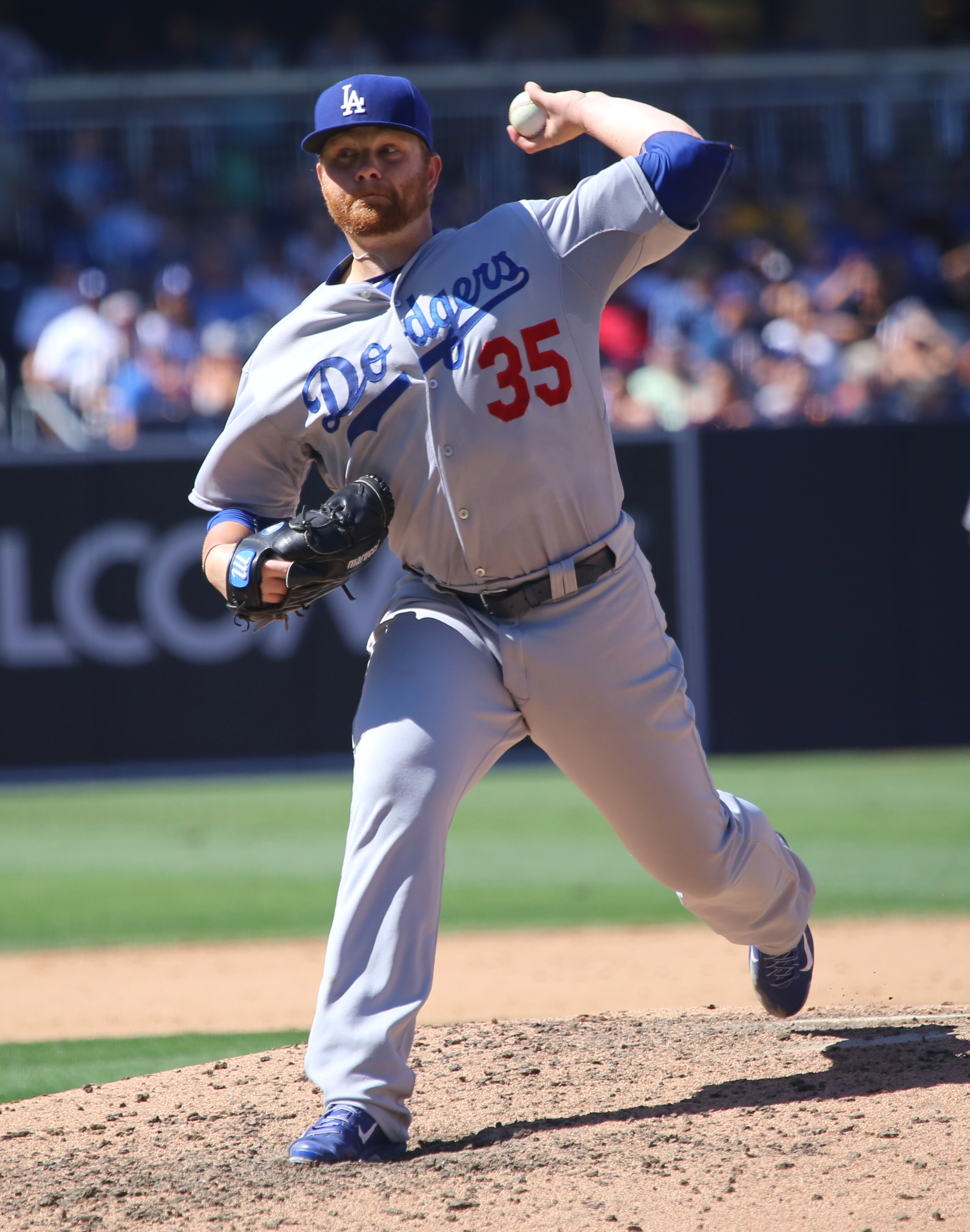
Anderson with the Los Angeles Dodgers in 2015

On December 31, 2014, Anderson was signed by the Los Angeles Dodgers to a one-year, $10 million, contract. In 2015 he started a career-high 31 games and pitched a career-high 180 1/3 innings. He was 10–9 with a 3.69 ERA. He had the highest ground ball percentage among major league pitchers (66.3%), and the lowest line drive percentage (15.2%) and fly ball percentage (18.5%). He earned an extra $2.4 million in bonuses by reaching that innings mark.

After the season, Anderson accepted the Dodgers $15.8 million qualifying offer to remain with the club for the 2016 season. On March 3, 2016, it was announced Anderson required back surgery to repair a bulging disc in his back, and would miss 3–5 months. It was in the same area he had been injured in 2014. He finally rejoined the Dodgers on August 14 after a few minor league rehab starts. In his first start of the season, he allowed two home runs and five runs in the first inning and was replaced by a relief pitcher. He made three starts and one relief appearance for the Dodgers in September and was 1–2 with an 11.91 ERA for the season, allowing 15 earned runs in 11 1/3 innings.

=== Chicago Cubs ===
On January 26, 2017, Anderson signed a one-year contract with the Chicago Cubs for $3.5 million, with incentives for the number of games started which could raise the total value of the contract to $10 million. Anderson was designated for assignment on July 26, 2017, and was released on August 1, 2017.

=== Toronto Blue Jays ===
On August 15, 2017, Anderson signed a minor league contract with the Toronto Blue Jays and was assigned to the Triple-A Buffalo Bisons. On August 29, the Blue Jays selected Anderson's contract where he made his Blue Jays debut against the Boston Red Sox that same day.

=== Oakland Athletics (second stint) ===
On March 20, 2018, Anderson signed a minor league contract with the Oakland Athletics. He was assigned to the Triple-A Nashville Sounds to begin the season. His contract was selected by Oakland on May 2 to make a start against the Seattle Mariners that night. After starting 4 games for the A's, Anderson was placed on the disabled list. He was activated off the disabled list on July 8. Anderson started 17 games on the season for the A's, finishing with a record of 4–5 in 80 1/3 innings.

On February 13, 2019, Anderson re-signed with the Athletics, inking a one-year deal worth $1.5 million plus incentives. In 2019 he had the lowest strikeouts/9 innings ratio in the major leagues (4.60), and the lowest strikeout percentage in the major leagues (12.1%).

=== Milwaukee Brewers ===
On December 13, 2019, Anderson signed a one-year, $5 million contract with the Milwaukee Brewers. In 2020, Anderson pitched to a 4–4 record over 10 appearances, with a 4.21 ERA and 32 strikeouts in 47.0 innings of work.

On February 16, 2021, Anderson agreed to re-sign with the Brewers on a one-year, $2.5MM contract, pending a physical. On February 22, the deal became official. In 24 starts for Milwaukee in 2021, he posted a 4–9 record and 4.22 ERA with 58 strikeouts in 96.0 innings of work. He became a free agent following the season.

On December 16, 2022, Anderson announced he wanted to return to MLB, and was participating in offseason training with Clayton Kershaw to stay in shape.

== Scouting report ==
Anderson throws four pitches for strikes: a fastball, a curve, a changeup and a slider. His fastball sits in the 89-92 mph range and he offers a two-seam variety in addition to the traditional four-seam version. His best pitch is the slider, a two-plane breaking ball he can paint on the corner versus right-handed batters and sweep away from lefties in the 79-81 mph range. His low-to-mid 70s curveball is a weapon in any count and his 82-84 mph changeup has shown the most improvement as Anderson has fought his way through injuries. Over the course of his career, Anderson's arm slot has lowered slightly, dropping from high three-quarters to true three-quarters. He's athletic and repeats his mechanics, aiding in his ability to command his entire arsenal. Anderson is considered an "extreme ground ball pitcher" with a ground ball rate of 58.2% -- second highest of all starting pitchers, since his career began in 2009.
