= Carlos González (baseball) =

Venezuelan baseball player (born 1985)

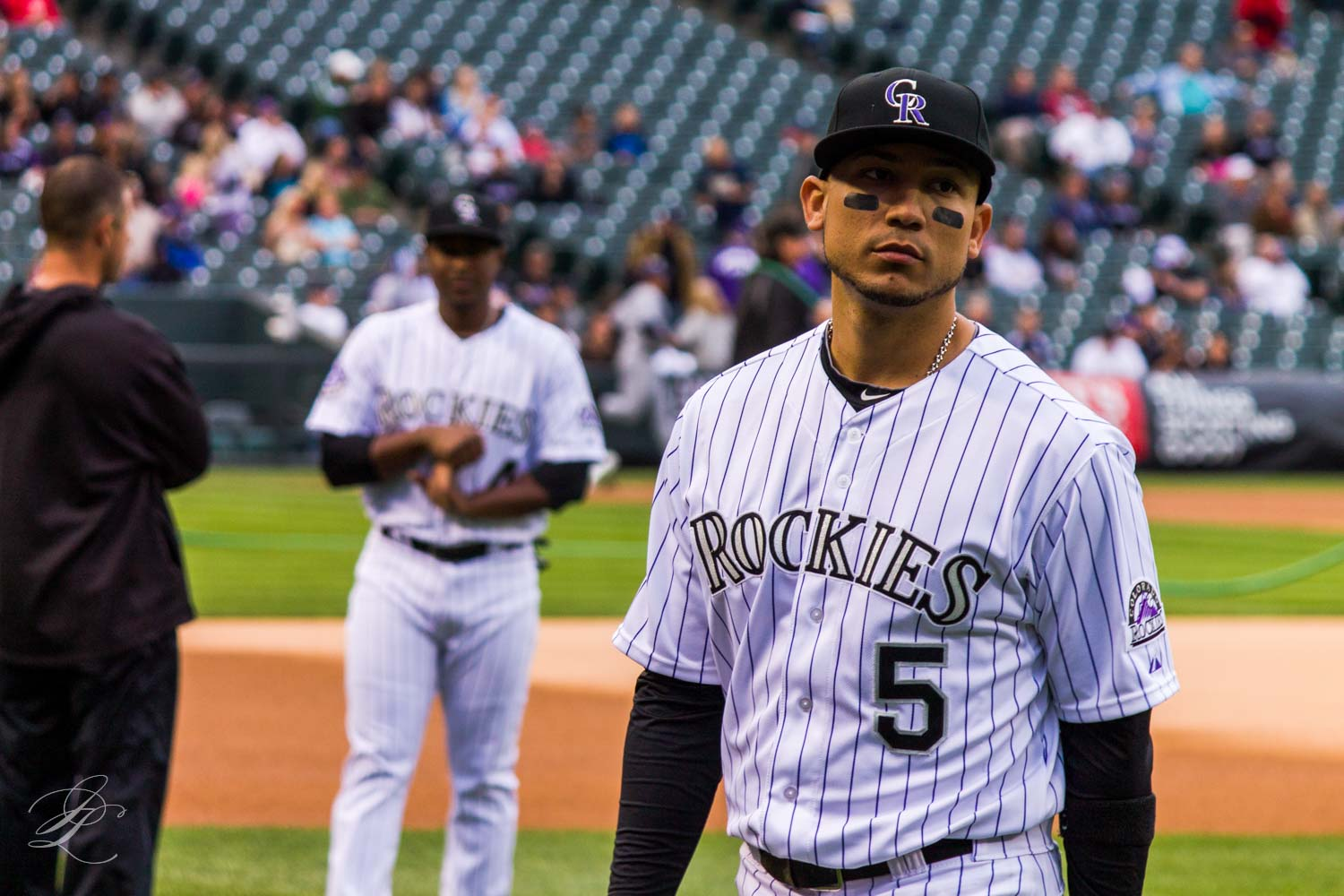
- González with the Colorado Rockies in 2013
- Outfielder
- Born: October 17, 1985 (age 40); Maracaibo, Venezuela
- Batted: Left Threw: Left

MLB debut
- May 30, 2008, for the Oakland Athletics

Last MLB appearance
- June 27, 2019, for the Chicago Cubs

Career statistics
- Batting average: .285
- Home runs: 234
- Runs batted in: 785
- Stats at Baseball Reference

Teams
- Oakland Athletics (2008); Colorado Rockies (2009–2018); Cleveland Indians (2019); Chicago Cubs (2019)

Career highlights and awards
- 3× All-Star (2012, 2013, 2016); 3× Gold Glove Award (2010, 2012, 2013); 2× Silver Slugger Award (2010, 2015); NL batting champion (2010)

Carlos Eduardo González (born October 17, 1985), nicknamed "CarGo", is a Venezuelan former professional baseball outfielder. He played in Major League Baseball (MLB) from 2008 to 2019, most prominently as a member of the Colorado Rockies, where he was a three-time All-Star player and the 2010 National League (NL) batting champion. González also won three Gold Glove Awards and two Silver Slugger Awards with the Rockies.

While mainly a right fielder throughout his career, González was the Rockies' starting left fielder from 2010 to 2014; in 2015 he transitioned to right field. He debuted in MLB with the Oakland Athletics and played for the Cleveland Indians and Chicago Cubs in his final season in the majors.

== Career ==
=== Arizona Diamondbacks ===
Born in Maracaibo, Venezuela, González signed with the Arizona Diamondbacks as an international free agent on August 3, 2002. González began his professional baseball career in 2003 for the Rookie League Missoula Osprey. González batted .258 with six home runs in 72 games. In 2004, González split time between the Low Single-A Yakima Bears and the Single-A South Bend Silver Hawks. In 85 games, he batted .275 with 10 home runs.

González played again for the Silver Hawks in 2005. He led the team in games played (129) and RBIs (92), and was also second on the team in batting average (.307), home runs (18), at bats (515) and runs scored (91). González was named to the Midwest League midseason and postseason All-Star teams and was also selected as the Midwest League Most Valuable Player and Prospect of the Year. Baseball America and Topps each named González as a Low Class-A All-Star. Topps also chose him as the Midwest League Player of the Year.

In 2006, Baseball America rated González at #32 on their top 100 prospects list and was the 6th-highest Diamondbacks player on that list. González mainly played for the High Single-A Lancaster JetHawks in 2006, but also spent some time with the Double-A Tennessee Smokies. González played in 122 games and batted .289 with a career high 23 home runs. He also led the JetHawks in home runs (21) and RBIs (93). González was also an All-Star Futures Game selection and a California League postseason All-Star selection. Baseball America rated González as a High Class-A All-Star, and he received the same honor from Topps.

In 2007, Baseball America rated González at #18 on their top 10 prospects list and was the 3rd highest Diamondbacks player on that list. González mainly played for the Double-A Mobile BayBears, but also spent some time in Triple-A with the Tucson Sidewinders. González played in 130 games and batted .288 with 17 home runs. González led the BayBears in home runs (16) and RBI (75). González was once again named to the All-Star Futures Game.

On December 14, 2007, the Diamondbacks traded González, Dana Eveland, Aaron Cunningham, Chris Carter, Brett Anderson, and Greg Smith to the Oakland Athletics for Dan Haren and Connor Robertson.

=== Oakland Athletics ===
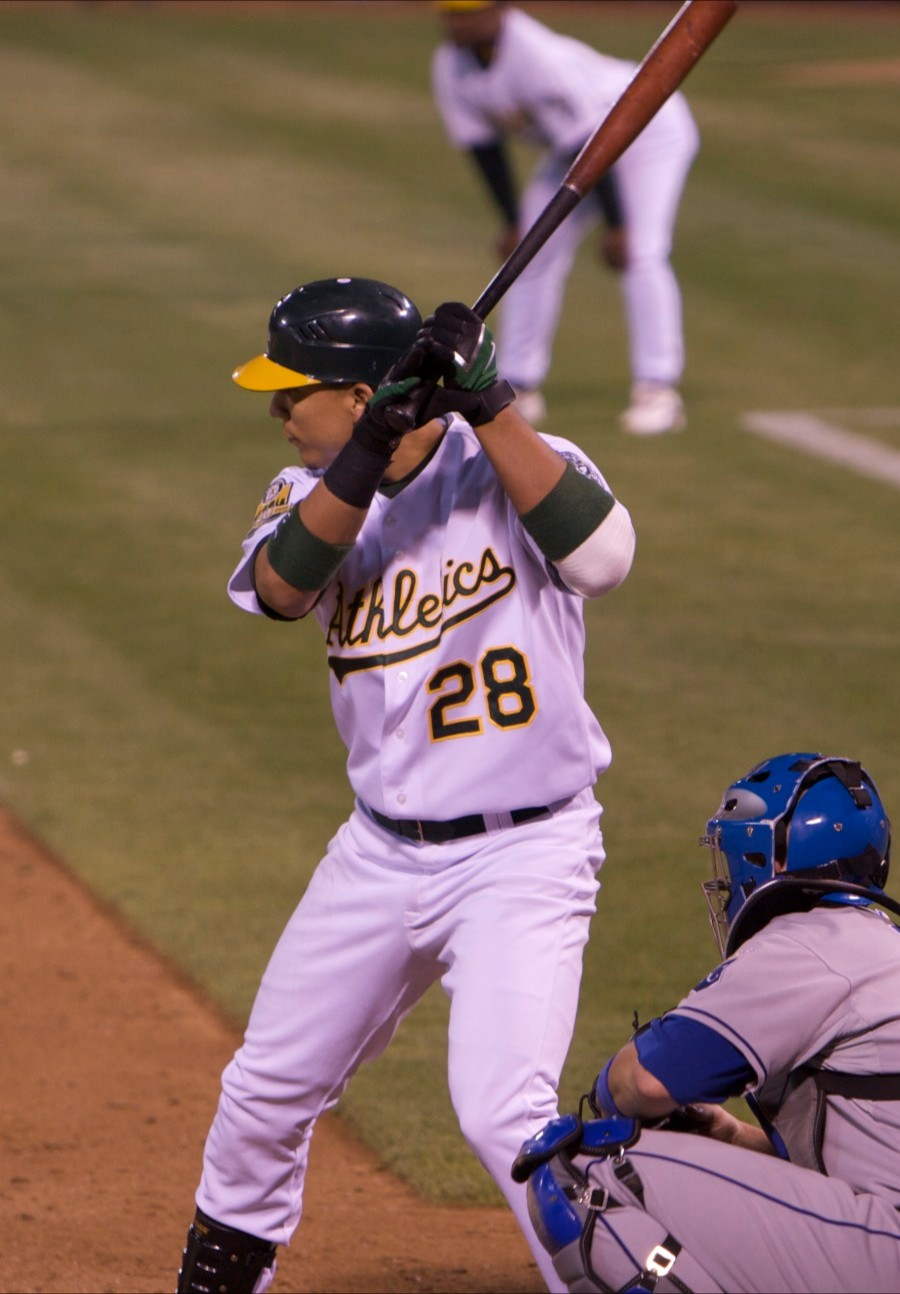
González batting for the Athletics in 2008

On May 30, 2008, González made his MLB debut at the age of 22 against the Texas Rangers, where he got his first career hit, an opposite field double down the left field line off Texas Rangers pitcher Kevin Millwood. This was one of two doubles he hit in his major league debut. His next five major league hits were also doubles, making González the first player since Hall of Famer Johnny Mize in 1936 to record the first seven hits of his career as extra base hits. On June 20, 2008, González hit his first career home run against the Florida Marlins. It was a solo home run that was hit off a curveball to right-center field. He had his first 4-hit game, going 4-for-4 against the Toronto Blue Jays on August 8.

=== Colorado Rockies ===
On November 12, 2008, González was traded with Huston Street and Greg Smith to the Colorado Rockies for Matt Holliday. After what many called a disappointing season with Oakland, González spent most of the season with the Rockies Triple-A affiliate, the Colorado Springs Sky Sox. After a series of injuries to the Rockies outfield, González was called up and started slowly, but eventually began to produce, proving himself as a nice combination of power and speed atop the lineup. In the National League Division Series against the Philadelphia Phillies, González tied the franchise record for the most hits in an NLDS with 10, and led the NLDS and ALDS in batting average with .588 in four games.

On July 31, 2010, in a game against the Chicago Cubs, González hit for the cycle, including a walk-off home run on the first pitch in the bottom of the 9th inning. He became the first player since Dwight Evans of the Boston Red Sox in 1984 to hit a walk-off home run for the cycle, according to the Elias Sports Bureau. Manager Jim Tracy labeled González as not just a five-tool player, but a "six-tool player." Only four other players in major league baseball history had completed a cycle with a game-ending homer: Ken Boyer (1961), César Tovar (1972), George Brett (1979), Dwight Evans (1984). Nolan Arenado repeated the feat in 2017 to make it six total players in major league history.

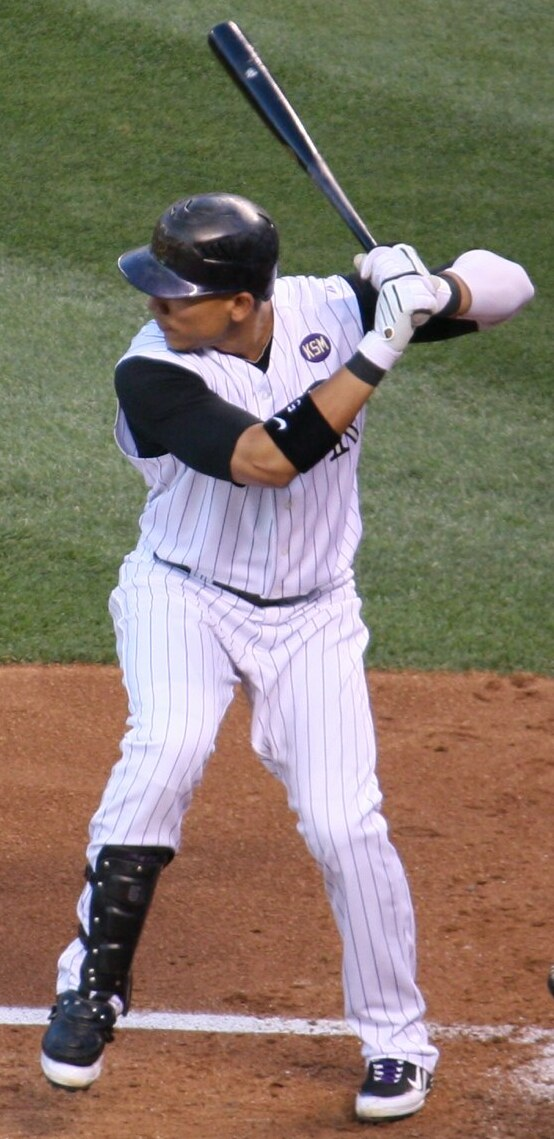
González batting for the Rockies in 2010

In 2010, González finished in the top 5 in home runs, batting average, RBIs, and runs scored in the National League. He was a contender for the Triple Crown and National League MVP award, along with St. Louis Cardinals first baseman Albert Pujols and Cincinnati Reds first baseman Joey Votto. However, González fell short on home runs and narrowly missed having the most RBI but did manage to win the NL batting title in 2010 with a .336 average. He finished with 34 home runs, 117 RBI and a National League-leading 197 hits. He also led the National League in total bases (351) and power-speed number (29.5).

González received the National League Players Choice Award for Outstanding Player in 2010. He then won the Players Choice Award for Player of the Year throughout the MLBPA. González also won the Luis Aparicio Award, given to the most outstanding Venezuelan player in MLB, as voted by Venezuelan and international Spanish-speaking media. He finished third in voting for National League MVP. For his defensive efforts in 2010, in which he only committed one error in the outfield, González won his first Gold Glove. On the offensive side, González received his first Silver Slugger Award.

González signed a seven-year, $80.5 million contract extension with the Rockies on January 11, 2011. The contract included a $3 million signing bonus and yearly salaries through 2017 that ramp up to $20 million. It is the largest contract in MLB history for a two-year player. On May 31, 2012, he became the 22nd player in MLB history to hit a home run in four consecutive at-bats, doing this during a two-game span against the Houston Astros. In early July 2011, González injured his right wrist and was placed on the disabled list. On July 21, 2011, he yet again injured the wrist against the Atlanta Braves. On May 14, 2013, he went 5-for-5 against the Chicago Cubs at Wrigley Field, hitting 2 home runs and setting a new career high with 5 hits in one game. On June 5, 2013, he hit 3 home runs against the Cincinnati Reds at Great American Ball Park in a 12–4 victory.

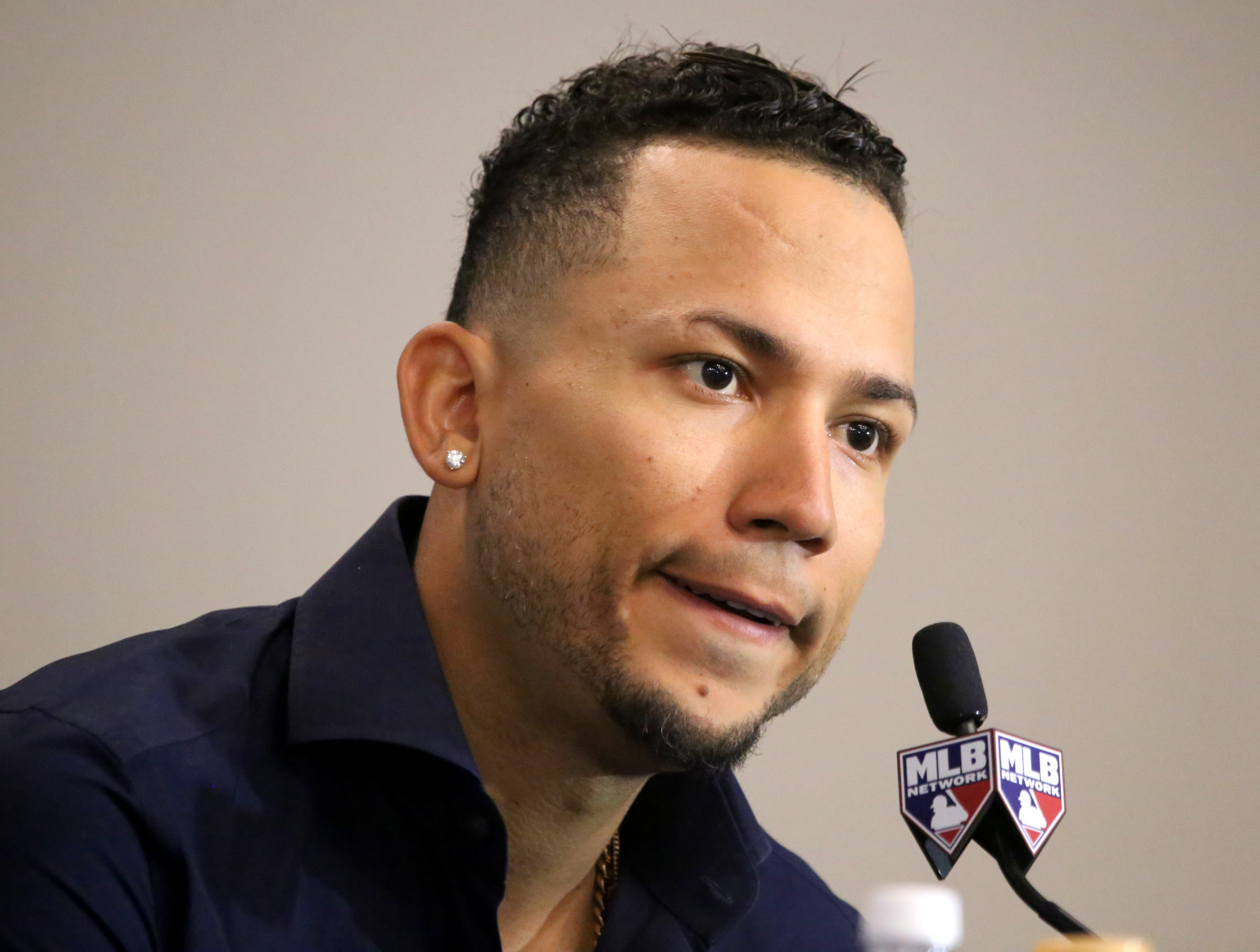
González answering questions at the 2016 All-Star Game

In 2014, with the breakout of Corey Dickerson, González was moved to right field.

González won a Silver Slugger Award in right field for the 2015 season after hitting 40 home runs, second most in the National League.

After his poor performance in the 2017 season, it was highly speculated that González would not return to play for the Rockies in the 2018 season. After the 2017 season, González temporarily left the team and entered free agency. However, González was re-signed to a one-year, $8 million contract on March 12, 2018, to remain playing for the Rockies.

In 2018, he played 132 games hitting 16 home runs and batting .276 with 67 RBI's. He entered free agency at the end of the season.

=== Cleveland Indians ===
González signed a minor league contract with the Cleveland Indians on March 19, 2019; the deal included a non-roster invitation to spring training. He is set to make $2 million, plus $1 million in incentives, because he made the big league roster.

The Indians purchased González's contract on April 14, 2019. González was designated for assignment by the Indians on May 22, 2019, after hitting .210 with 2 home runs and 7 runs batted in. After clearing waivers, González elected free agency on May 26, 2019.

=== Chicago Cubs ===
On May 30, 2019, González agreed to a minor league contract with the Chicago Cubs. The team purchased his contract on June 3, 2019, and he was the starting right fielder in an inter-league game against the Los Angeles Angels. With one out and the bases loaded in the seventh inning, González made a highlight-reel game-saving diving catch. On June 29, he was designated for assignment for the second time in the 2019 season. On July 2, González again elected free agency.

=== Seattle Mariners ===
González signed to a minor league contract with the Seattle Mariners on February 12, 2020, with the Seattle Mariners. The team released him on June 25, before the 2020 season began.

== Personal life ==
González married Indonesia Riera on October 20, 2012. He is the father of a boy and twin girls.

== See also ==
- List of Major League Baseball batting champions
- List of Major League Baseball players from Venezuela
- List of Major League Baseball players to hit for the cycle

Achievements
Preceded by Kelly Johnson	Hitting for the cycle July 31, 2010	Succeeded by George Kottaras
