= Greg Smith (pitcher) =

American baseball player (born 1983)

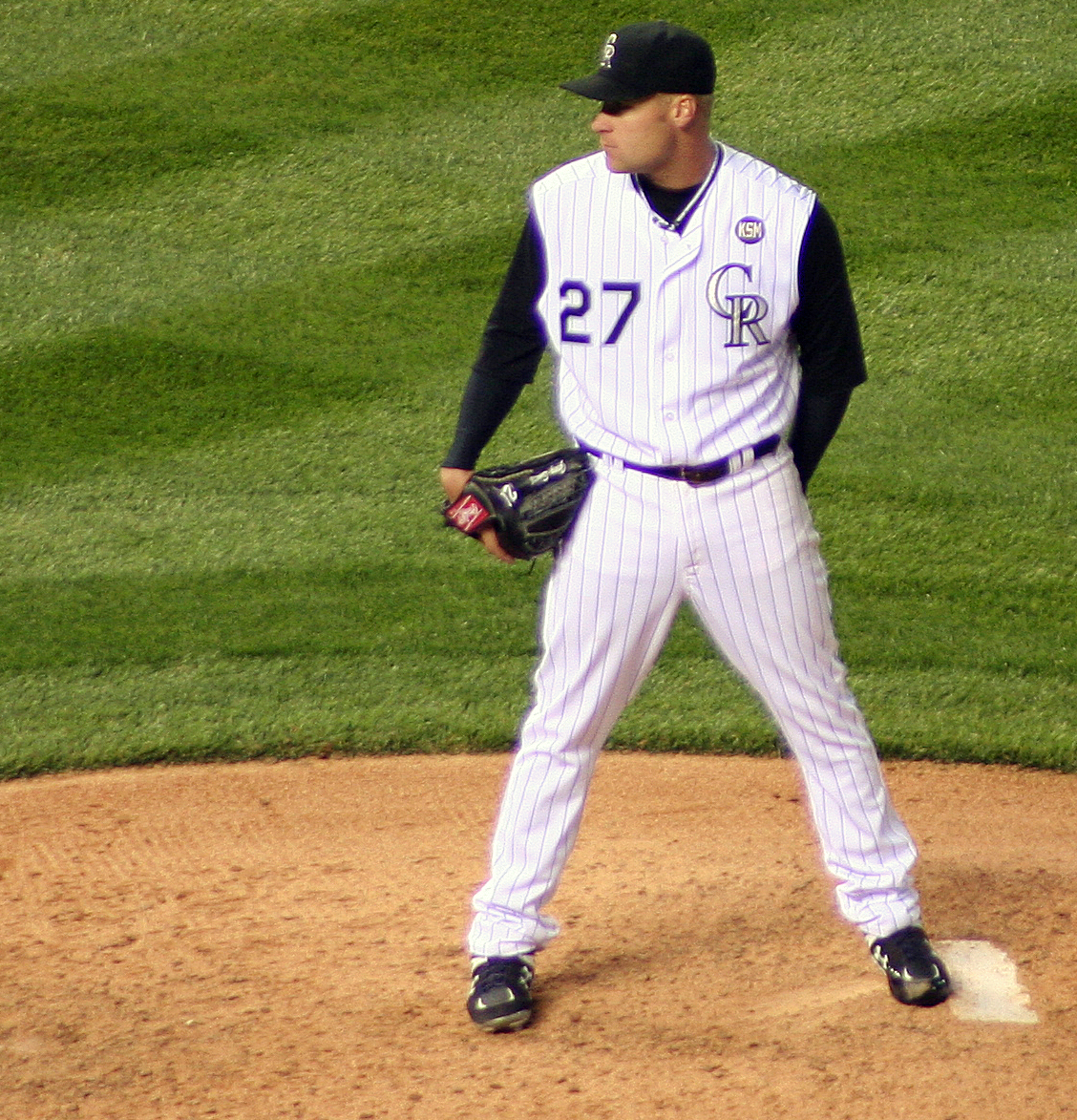
- Smith with the Colorado Rockies
- Pitcher
- Born: December 22, 1983 (age 42); Alexandria, Louisiana, U.S.
- Batted: Left Threw: Left

Professional debut
- MLB: April 9, 2008, for the Oakland Athletics
- CPBL: April 1, 2016, for the Lamigo Monkeys

Last appearance
- MLB: May 19, 2010, for the Colorado Rockies
- CPBL: May 27, 2016, for the Lamigo Monkeys

MLB statistics
- Win–loss record: 8–18
- Earned run average: 4.51
- Strikeouts: 142

CPBL statistics
- Win–loss record: 1-5
- Earned run average: 8.46
- Strikeouts: 31
- Stats at Baseball Reference

Teams
- Oakland Athletics (2008); Colorado Rockies (2010); Lamigo Monkeys (2016)

Gregory Thomas Smith (born December 22, 1983) is an American former professional baseball pitcher. He played in Major League Baseball for the Oakland Athletics and Colorado Rockies, and in the Chinese Professional Baseball League (CPBL) for the Lamigo Monkeys.

== Baseball career ==
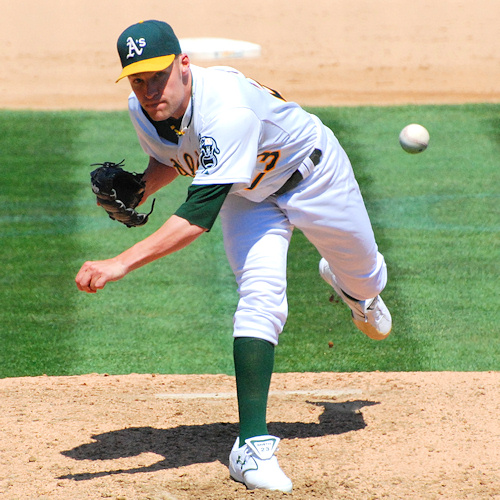
Smith during his time with the A's.

=== Amateur ===
Smith attended Louisiana State University, where he played for the LSU Tigers baseball team. In 2004, he played collegiate summer baseball with the Bourne Braves of the Cape Cod Baseball League.

=== Arizona Diamondbacks ===
Smith was drafted by the Arizona Diamondbacks in the sixth round, with the 171st overall selection, of the 2005 Major League Baseball draft. He made his professional debut with the rookie–level Missoula Osprey.

=== Oakland Athletics ===
On December 14, 2007, Smith was traded to the Oakland Athletics along with Carlos González, Brett Anderson, Aaron Cunningham, Dana Eveland, and Chris Carter for Dan Haren and Connor Robertson. Smith made his first major league start on April 9, 2008, pitching six innings and allowing two earned runs, and earned a no decision.

In the 2008 season, he led the majors in pickoffs with 15, tying the Major League record since the stat was first tracked in 1987.

Smith would wind up finishing the season with a 7-16 record in 32 starts for the A's. He threw 190 1/3 innings while throwing 2 complete games.

=== Colorado Rockies ===
On November 12, 2008, Smith was traded with Huston Street and Carlos González to the Colorado Rockies in exchange for Matt Holliday.

Smith missed the first half of the season due to injury and never made it to the major league club during the year. He only pitched in 11 games split between the High–A Modesto Nuts, Double–A Tulsa Drillers, and Triple–A Colorado Springs Sky Sox.

In 2010, Smith made Colorado's Opening Day roster. He recorded his first win as a Rockie against the New York Mets on April 14, tossing seven innings of two–run ball. He also drove in two runs.

Smith would make 6 more starts for the Rockies before being demoted to Triple–A. Smith wound up finishing with a record of 1–2 with an ERA of 6.23 in 39 innings. He also issued 24 walks with 31 strikeouts. On August 26, 2010, Smith was removed from the 40-man roster and sent outright to Triple–A Colorado Springs.

On March 31, 2011, following spring training, Smith was officially released by the Rockies organization.

=== Grand Prairie AirHogs ===
On May 13, 2011, Smith signed with the Grand Prairie AirHogs of the American Association of Professional Baseball. In 6 starts for Grand Prairie, he compiled a 3–1 record and 2.54 ERA with 31 strikeouts over 39 innings pitched.

=== New York Yankees ===
On June 12, 2011, Smith signed a minor league contract with the New York Yankees. He was subsequently assigned to the Triple–A Scranton/Wilkes-Barre Yankees. He was released on August 15, after posting an ERA of 4.84 in 13 games.

=== Boston Red Sox ===
On August 18, 2011, Smith signed a minor league contract with the Boston Red Sox, and was assigned to the Triple–A Pawtucket Red Sox. He became a free agent following the season on November 2.

Between the Yankees and Red Sox Triple–A affiliates, Smith compiled a 5-4 record with a 4.52 ERA and 51 strikeouts in 17 games.

=== Los Angeles Angels Of Anaheim ===
On January 23, 2012, Smith signed a minor league contract with the Los Angeles Angels of Anaheim. Despite posting an 11–11 record and having better control throughout the season, Smith never got called up by the Angels. He became a free agent following the season on November 2.

=== Philadelphia Phillies ===
On December 11, 2012, the Toronto Blue Jays announced that Smith had been signed to a minor league contract. However, Smith never reported to the Buffalo Bisons, Toronto's Triple–A affiliate.

On 6 May 2013, the Philadelphia Phillies announced that Smith signed to a minor league contract. He was later moved to the bullpen for the first time in his career. On July 26, Smith threw a season high 101 pitches en route to a win. He improved his record to 5–1 in the Triple–A Lehigh Valley IronPigs. Smith won July Honors for the IronPigs, going 3–0 with a 1.06 ERA in 5 starts, improving his record to 7–2 for the affiliate. He finished the season 8–4 with a 3.31 ERA and 50 strikeouts in 23 games for the IronPigs.

=== Atlanta Braves ===
On November 7, 2014, Smith signed a minor league contract with the Atlanta Braves. They subsequently assigned him to the Triple–A Gwinnett Braves. For the fifth season in a row, he spent the majority of the season in Triple–A, alternating between starting and relieving. In 31 games, including 19 starts, Smith posted an ERA of 2.71 with 67 strikeouts while going 6–7. He became a free agent following the season on November 6.

=== Lamigo Monkeys ===
On March 3, 2016, Smith signed with the Lancaster Barnstormers of the Atlantic League of Professional Baseball. However, on March 24, Smith signed with the Lamigo Monkeys of the Chinese Professional Baseball League. In 9 appearances for Lamigo, Smith struggled to an 8.46 ERA with 31 strikeouts across 44 2/3 innings pitched. He was released on May 30, 2016.

== Scouting report ==
Smith is a changeup specialist, relying more on off speed pitches and deception rather than velocity. His fastball tops out between 86-88 MPH and he also throws a curveball.

One knock on Smith throughout his career has been the walks per nine innings, as he has amassed more than four walks per nine innings.
