= Connor Robertson =

American baseball player (born 1981)

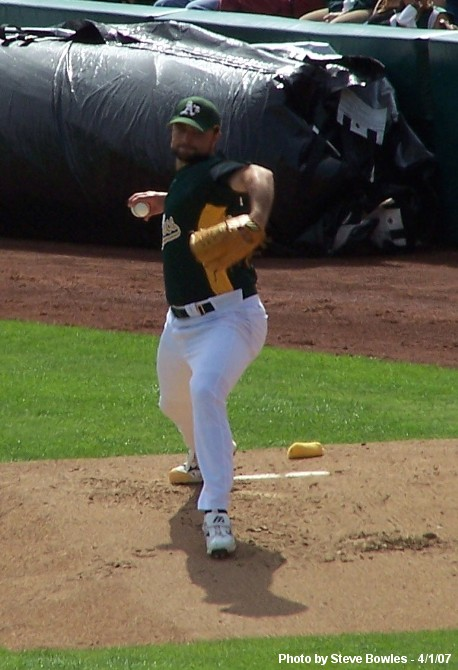
- Relief pitcher
- Born: September 10, 1981 (age 45); Tuscaloosa, Alabama, U.S.
- Batted: Right Threw: Right

MLB debut
- May 17, 2007, for the Oakland Athletics

Last MLB appearance
- July 18, 2008, for the Arizona Diamondbacks

MLB statistics
- Win–loss record: 0-1
- Earned run average: 8.00
- Strikeouts: 4
- Stats at Baseball Reference

Teams
- Oakland Athletics (2007); Arizona Diamondbacks (2008)

James Connor Robertson (born September 10, 1981) is an American former right-handed Major League Baseball relief pitcher. He was drafted out of Birmingham–Southern College in the 31st round of the 2004 Major League Baseball draft by the Oakland Athletics.

== Career ==
Robertson was drafted in the 31st round of the 2004 MLB draft by the Oakland Athletics out of Birmingham–Southern College. He spent four years working his way up the Oakland minor league system before making his major league debut on May 17 in which he pitched an inning and two thirds in an Oakland 4–7 loss to the Royals; Robertson made two more appearances in the 2007 season and was optioned back to AAA where he pitched as the closer before breaking his thumb and missing the rest of the 2007 season. On December 14, 2007, Robertson was traded with starting pitcher Dan Haren to the Arizona Diamondbacks for left-handed pitchers Brett Anderson, Dana Eveland and Greg Smith, infielder Chris Carter and outfielders Aaron Cunningham and Carlos Gonzalez.

In the 2008 season Robertson would make six appearances for the Diamondbacks before being traded in the off season to the New York Mets for Scott Schoeneweis. he would spend the entire 2009 season in the minor leagues and the Mets released him at the conclusion of the 2009 season. Robertson pitched for the Southern Maryland Blue Crabs in the 2010 season in their rotation and in the bullpen; he has not pitched professionally since the conclusion of the Blue Crabs 2010 season.

== Personal life ==
His brother David is a former relief pitcher.

== Pitch repertoire ==
Robertson throws a hard, sinking fastball that has been clocked as high as 91 miles per hour (146 km/h). He also has a sweeping slider and a changeup.

== Bibliography ==
2006 Oakland Athletics Media Guide. Pg. 393. Produced by the Oakland Athletics Public Relations Department.
