= Justin Duchscherer =

American baseball player (born 1977)

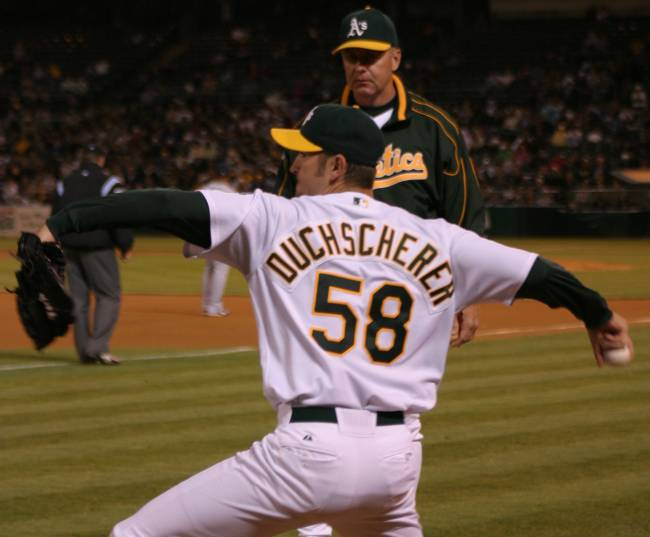
- Duchscherer with the Oakland Athletics
- Pitcher
- Born: November 19, 1977 (age 48); Aberdeen, South Dakota, U.S.
- Batted: Right Threw: Right

MLB debut
- July 25, 2001, for the Texas Rangers

Last MLB appearance
- April 29, 2010, for the Oakland Athletics

MLB statistics
- Win–loss record: 33–25
- Earned run average: 3.13
- Strikeouts: 347
- Stats at Baseball Reference

Teams
- Texas Rangers (2001); Oakland Athletics (2003–2008, 2010)

Career highlights and awards
- 2× All-Star (2005, 2008)

Justin Craig Duchscherer [DUKE-shur] (born November 19, 1977) is an American former professional baseball pitcher. He pitched in Major League Baseball for the Texas Rangers and Oakland Athletics.

== Playing career ==
=== Early career ===
Duchscherer (nickname: "The Duke of Hurl") was selected by the Boston Red Sox in the 8th round (241st overall) of the 1996 Major League Baseball draft out of Coronado High School in Lubbock, Texas. His high-80s fastball made him one of the hardest throwers in the area, but his velocity soon ranked as only average as he entered the minor leagues.

In 1998, he went 7–12 with a 4.79 ERA in 30 appearances (26 starts) for Single-A Michigan. As Duchscherer continued to struggle in the low levels of the minor leagues, he was beginning to look more like a roster filler than a big-league prospect. But in 2001, he turned his career around. He went 6–3 with a 2.44 ERA in 12 starts for Double-A Trenton before being traded to the Texas Rangers for catcher Doug Mirabelli. He finished the year pitching well with the Texas organization, going 4-0 for Double-A Tulsa and sporting a 2.84 ERA after his call-up to Triple-A Oklahoma. He received his first major league call-up in 2001, a very forgettable one. He went 1–1 with a 12.27 ERA for the Rangers.

=== Oakland Athletics ===
In spring training 2002, Duchscherer was traded to the Oakland Athletics for Luis Vizcaíno. After suffering a lower back injury in 2002, Duchscherer bounced back in 2003, going 14–2 with a 3.25 ERA for Triple-A Sacramento.

In his last year of Triple-A, he started the All-Star game even though the chosen starting pitcher was Harden. A few hours before the game, Harden got called up to the major leagues, clearing the way for Duchscherer to start the game. On September 9, 2003, he made a start for the A's in place of ace Mark Mulder against the Anaheim Angels in the heat of a tight division race. He pitched 7 scoreless innings to earn his first win. That same day, his wife gave birth to their first son, Evan Duchscherer.

In the spring of 2004, the A's chose Duchscherer over Chad Harville, and traded Harville to the Houston Astros for Kirk Saarloos. Duchscherer appeared in 53 games out of the bullpen, sporting an ERA of 3.27. In 2005, he was selected to the American League All-Star team, the A's lone representative, but did not pitch in the game. He finished the year with 7 wins out of the bullpen and a 2.21 ERA as the top setup man for rookie closer Huston Street.

During the 2007 season, Duchscherer spent most of the season on the disabled list with an injured right hip that required season-ending surgery.

For the 2008 season, Duchscherer returned to the starting rotation for the A's. Duchscherer spent about three weeks on the disabled list with an inflamed biceps in April. After returning to the rotation, Duchscherer was outstanding and, at one point, led the major leagues in ERA. He was selected to the 2008 MLB All Star Game.

Duchscherer missed the 2009 season due to shoulder and back injuries and a bout with clinical depression. He became a free agent following the season, rejecting the A's arbitration offer.

On December 30, 2009, Duchscherer signed a one-year contract with a base salary of $2 million, with another $3.5 million with incentives with the Oakland Athletics

Duchscherer made 5 starts for Oakland in the first month of the 2010 season, posting a 2–1 record with a 2.89 ERA, but went on the disabled list in May and missed the remainder of the season. He became a free agent on November 2.

=== Baltimore Orioles ===
On February 4, 2011, Duchscherer signed a one-year deal with the Baltimore Orioles. He was released on August 1.
