= Fernando Hernández (baseball, born 1984) =

American baseball player

- Relief pitcher
- Born: July 31, 1984 (age 41); Miami, Florida, U.S.
- Batted: Right Threw: Right

MLB debut
- April 9, 2008, for the Oakland Athletics

Last MLB appearance
- April 13, 2008, for the Oakland Athletics

Career statistics (through 2008 season)
- Win–loss record: 1–0
- Earned run average: 18.00
- Strikeouts: 2
- Stats at Baseball Reference

Teams
- Oakland Athletics (2008)

Fernando Hernández (born July 31, 1984) is an American former professional baseball pitcher.

== Career ==
Hernández was drafted by the Chicago White Sox in the 49th round of the 2002 Major League Baseball draft. He was later taken in the Rule 5 draft by the Oakland Athletics before the 2008 season. Hernández made the opening day roster with a spot in the bullpen. On April 9, 2008, Hernández made his major league debut against the Toronto Blue Jays and pitched one inning and struck out one, while receiving a win in the process. On April 14, he was designated for assignment, and on April 16, he was returned to the White Sox. Hernández signed with the Athletics for the 2010 season.

On February 16, 2011, Hernández signed a minor league deal with the New York Yankees. He was released on July 4. He signed a minor league contract with the Toronto Blue Jays on February 28, 2012, for the 2012 season. On May 21, 2013, the Blue Jays activated Hernández from the New Hampshire Fisher Cats disabled list, and released him. Hernandez played for the Laredo Lemurs of the American Association of Independent Professional Baseball for the 2013 season. Hernandez signed with the Long Island Ducks for the 2014 season. Hernandez signed with the Kansas City T-Bones of the American Association of Independent Professional Baseball for the 2015 season.
