= Wes Bankston =

American baseball player

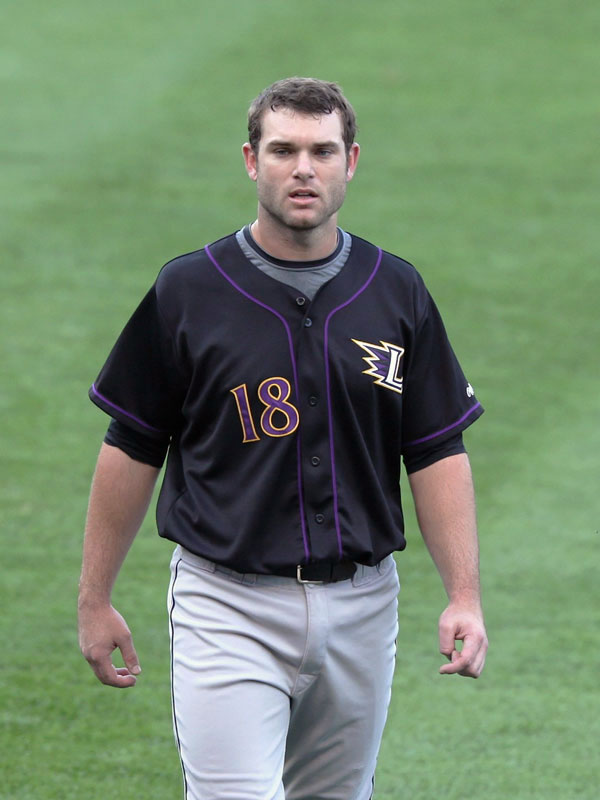
- First baseman
- Born: November 23, 1983 (age 42); Dallas, Texas, U.S.
- Batted: Right Threw: Right

MLB debut
- July 2, 2008, for the Oakland Athletics

Last MLB appearance
- July 30, 2008, for the Oakland Athletics

MLB statistics
- Batting average: .203
- Home runs: 1
- Runs batted in: 4
- Stats at Baseball Reference

Teams
- Oakland Athletics (2008)

Wesley Wade Bankston (born November 23, 1983) is an American former professional baseball first baseman. He played in Major League Baseball (MLB) for the Oakland Athletics . At Plano East High School, he played baseball and football as an outfielder and starting quarterback, respectively.

== Career ==
Bankston was committed to playing for the University of Texas before the Tampa Bay Devil Rays drafted him in the 4th round (104th overall) in the 2002 Major League Baseball draft. On June 17, 2002, he signed with the Devil Rays. Bankston started his professional career off well in 2002. Playing primarily as an outfielder for the Rookie League Princeton Devil Rays and the Single-A Hudson Valley Renegades, he hit a combined .301 with 18 home runs in 70 games. His impressive 18 home runs set the Princeton record, breaking Jared Sandberg's record of 17. Baseball America rated Bankston as the 2nd best prospect in the Appalachian League and the 6th best prospect in the Devil Rays organization.

In 2003, his performance dropped while playing for the Single-A Charleston RiverDogs. In 103 games, he hit just .256 with 12 home runs. Baseball America placed him on the Devil Rays organization prospect list as the 7th best prospect. Due to his poor performance in 2003, he spent the 2004 season again in Charleston. Converting to a full-time first baseman, he hit .289 with 23 home runs; his 23 home runs were a career high for him. His good performance also got him named as the team's Player of the Year and was also named to the South Atlantic League midseason All-Star team.

Bankston missed the first month of the season in 2005 with a torn left meniscus. After being activated from the disabled list, he played with the Single-A Visalia Oaks. After 17 games in which he hit .387 with 3 home runs, he was promoted to Double-A Montgomery, where he would be for the remainder of the season. Bankston played in 82 games for the Montgomery Biscuits and had a batting average of .292 with 12 home runs. Baseball America also rated him again as the 7th best prospect in the organization. His contract was purchased by the Devil Rays on November 18, 2005.

Bankston began the 2006 season for the Biscuits. Playing third base for the first time in his career, Bankston hit just .263 with 4 home runs in 45 games for the Biscuits. Regardless of his poor performance, he was still named to the Southern League midseason All-Star team as the starting third baseman. After the All-Star game, he was promoted to the Triple-A Durham Bulls on July 13, finishing the rest of the season at Durham. Bankston played in 52 games in his first year at the Triple-A level and batted .297 with 5 home runs.

Bankston's performance plummeted in 2007, playing the whole season in Triple-A. His .238 batting average was the worst to date in his career and his status as a prospect is not as high as it was before. He was designated for assignment on September 19, 2007, and was claimed off waivers by the Kansas City Royals on September 21. The Royals designated him for assignment on November 20, 2007, and was claimed off waivers by the Oakland Athletics. Bankston was designated for assignment on February 8, 2008. He cleared waivers and was outrighted to the minor leagues on February 13, 2008.

Bankston made his major league debut on July 2, 2008, with the Athletics against the Los Angeles Angels of Anaheim. His first major league home run came on July 7 against the Seattle Mariners. He was designated for assignment on August 18 and became a free agent at the end of the season. On December 18, he signed a minor league contract with the Cincinnati Reds, where he spent the 2009 season in their minor league system.

On February 24, 2010, Bankston signed a minor league deal with the Texas Rangers.
