= José García (pitcher, born 1985) =

Dominican baseball player

- Starting pitcher
- Born: January 7, 1985 (age 40); Dajabón, Dominican Republic
- Batted: Right Threw: Right

MLB debut
- September 11, 2006, for the Florida Marlins

Last MLB appearance
- October 1, 2006, for the Florida Marlins

MLB statistics
- Win–loss record: 0–0
- Earned run average: 4.91
- Strikeouts: 8
- Stats at Baseball Reference

Teams
- Florida Marlins (2006)

José Luis García (born January 7, 1985) is a Dominican former professional baseball pitcher. He played in Major League Baseball (MLB) for the Florida Marlins in 2006.

== Career ==
García spent part of two seasons in minor league baseball for the Florida Marlins. On November 18, 2005, the Florida Marlins added García to their 40-man roster to protect him from the Rule 5 draft. García making his major league debut on September 11, 2006. In six different minor league levels, he posted a 16–15 record with 248 strikeouts and a 3.37 ERA in 40 starts. He made five appearances for Florida, giving up six runs with eight strikeouts and a 4.91 ERA in 11 innings of relief work.

García also represented the Marlins in the 2006 All-Star Futures Game at PNC Park.

García was sidelined for the 2007 season after undergoing Tommy John surgery. He was claimed off waivers by the Oakland Athletics on October 11, 2007. On December 5, 2007, García was designated for assignment. García became a free agent at the end of the 2008 season, after playing in only 11 games in 2008.
