= Dana Eveland =

American baseball player (born 1983)

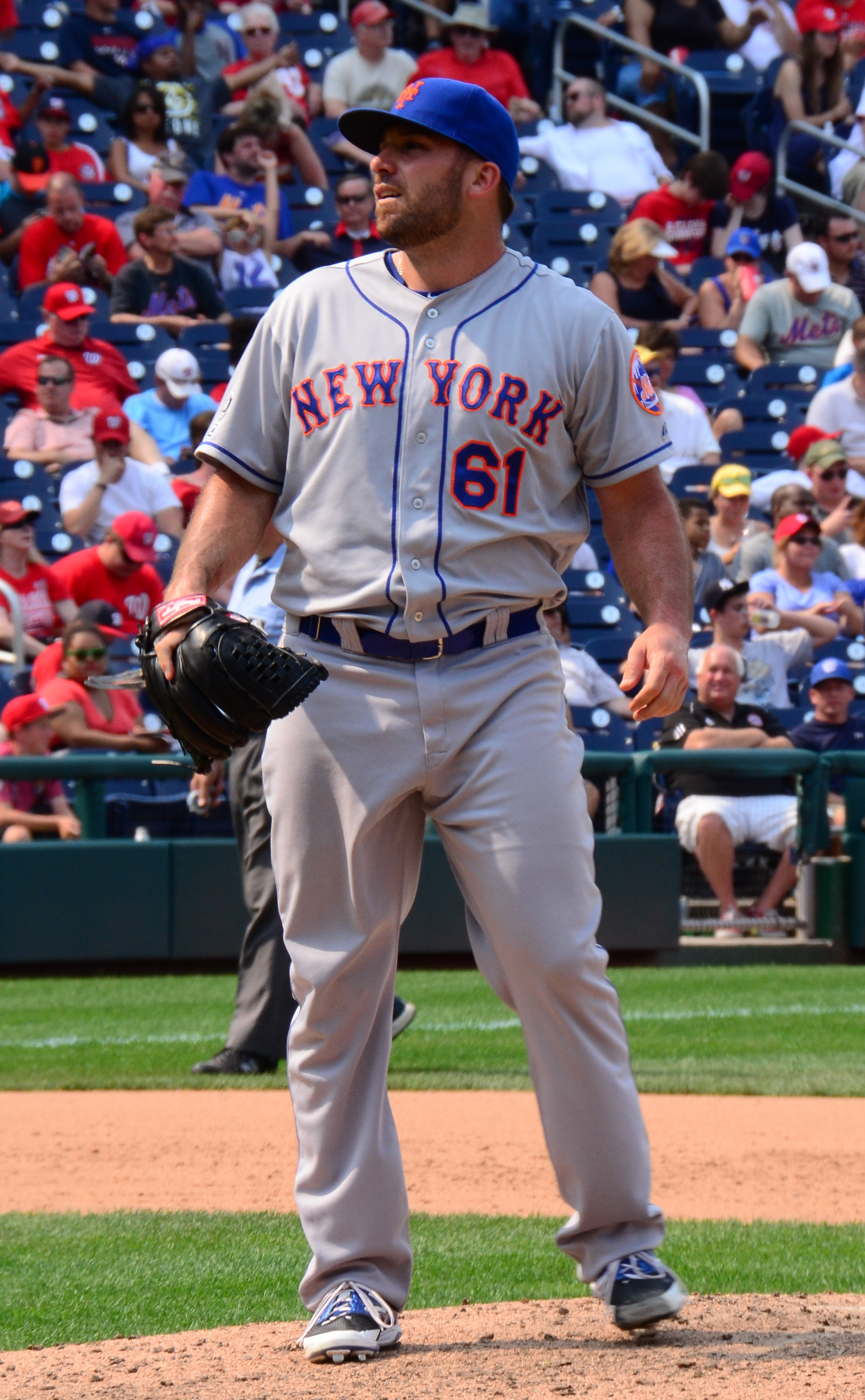
- Eveland with the New York Mets in 2014
- Pitcher
- Born: October 29, 1983 (age 43); Olympia, Washington, U.S.
- Batted: Left Threw: Left

Professional debut
- MLB: July 16, 2005, for the Milwaukee Brewers
- KBO: March 31, 2013, for the Hanwha Eagles

Last appearance
- MLB: September 27, 2016, for the Tampa Bay Rays
- KBO: October 2, 2013, for the Hanwha Eagles

MLB statistics
- Win–loss record: 20–28
- Earned run average: 5.46
- Strikeouts: 308

KBO statistics
- Win–loss record: 6–14
- Earned run average: 5.54
- Strikeouts: 129
- Stats at Baseball Reference

Teams
- Milwaukee Brewers (2005–2006); Arizona Diamondbacks (2007); Oakland Athletics (2008–2009); Toronto Blue Jays (2010); Pittsburgh Pirates (2010); Los Angeles Dodgers (2011); Baltimore Orioles (2012); Hanwha Eagles (2013); New York Mets (2014); Atlanta Braves (2015); Tampa Bay Rays (2016)
Medals
Men's baseball
Representing United States
WBSC Premier12
Silver medal – second place	2015 Tokyo	Team

Dana James Eveland (born October 29, 1983) is an American former professional baseball pitcher. He played in Major League Baseball (MLB) for the Milwaukee Brewers, Arizona Diamondbacks, Oakland Athletics, Toronto Blue Jays, Pittsburgh Pirates, Los Angeles Dodgers, Baltimore Orioles, New York Mets, Atlanta Braves, and Tampa Bay Rays. Eveland also played in the KBO League for the Hanwha Eagles.

== Early life ==
Eveland attended Palmdale High School in Palmdale, California, graduating in 2001. After one year at Hill College in Hillsboro, Texas, he transferred to College of the Canyons in Santa Clarita, California.

== Professional career ==
=== Milwaukee Brewers ===
Eveland was drafted by the Milwaukee Brewers in the 16th round (469th overall) of the 2002 MLB draft.

On July 16, 2005, Eveland made his MLB debut against the Washington Nationals. He would ultimately pitch out of the bullpen, appearing in 27 games, while posting a record of 1–1. The following season he would appear in nine games, with five starts. Eveland's record in 2006 was 0–3, with an 8.13 ERA.

=== Arizona Diamondbacks ===
After two seasons with the Brewers, Eveland was traded to the Arizona Diamondbacks on November 26, 2006, along with Doug Davis and Dave Krynzel in exchange for Greg Aquino, Johnny Estrada, and Claudio Vargas. He appeared in only five games for the Diamondbacks.

=== Oakland Athletics ===
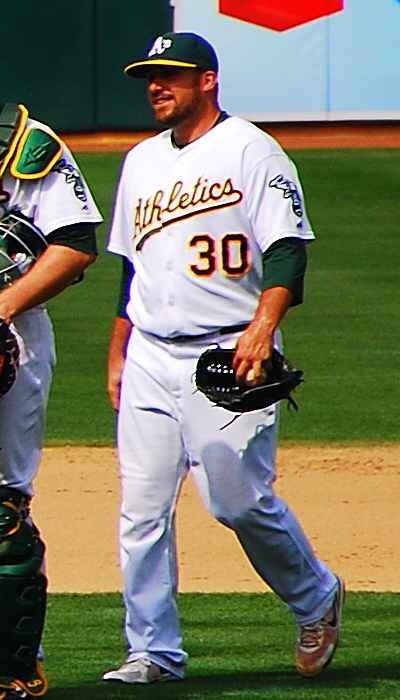
Eveland with the Oakland Athletics in 2009

On December 14, 2007, Eveland was dealt again as part of a six-player trade to the Oakland Athletics for Dan Haren and Connor Robertson.

In 2008, he made 29 starts for the Athletics, the most of his career. His record was 9–9 with a 4.34 ERA. He also gave up 27 four-pitch walks, the most in the majors.

The following season, Eveland finished 2–4 in 13 games, with nine starts and a 7.16 ERA. He was designated for assignment on February 1, 2010.

=== Toronto Blue Jays ===
On February 6, 2010, Eveland was acquired by the Toronto Blue Jays, in exchange for a player to be named later or cash considerations.

He started nine games, in which he went 3–4 with a 6.45 ERA, and was designated for assignment on May 24, 2010.

=== Pittsburgh Pirates ===
On June 1, 2010, Eveland was traded from the Blue Jays to the Pittsburgh Pirates in exchange for Ronald Uviedo. He appeared in only 3 games for the Pirates, 1 of which was a start. On June 24, 2010, he was designated for assignment.

=== Los Angeles Dodgers ===
On November 22, 2010, Eveland agreed to a minor league split contract with the Los Angeles Dodgers. He was assigned to the Triple-A Albuquerque Isotopes. He was selected to both the Pacific Coast League midseason and postseason All-Star teams. He made 25 starts for the Isotopes in 2011, with a 12–8 record and 4.38 ERA.

On September 1, 2011, The Dodgers called him up to MLB to start against the Pittsburgh Pirates. In that game he picked up the win while allowing only one run in eight innings. He wound up making 5 starts with the Dodgers in September, with a 3–2 record, 3.03 ERA and 16 strikeouts. He had extreme splits in his short time with the Dodgers. In 3 road starts he was 3–0 with an 0.44 ERA but in his two starts at Dodger Stadium he was 0–2 with a 9.00 ERA.

=== Baltimore Orioles ===
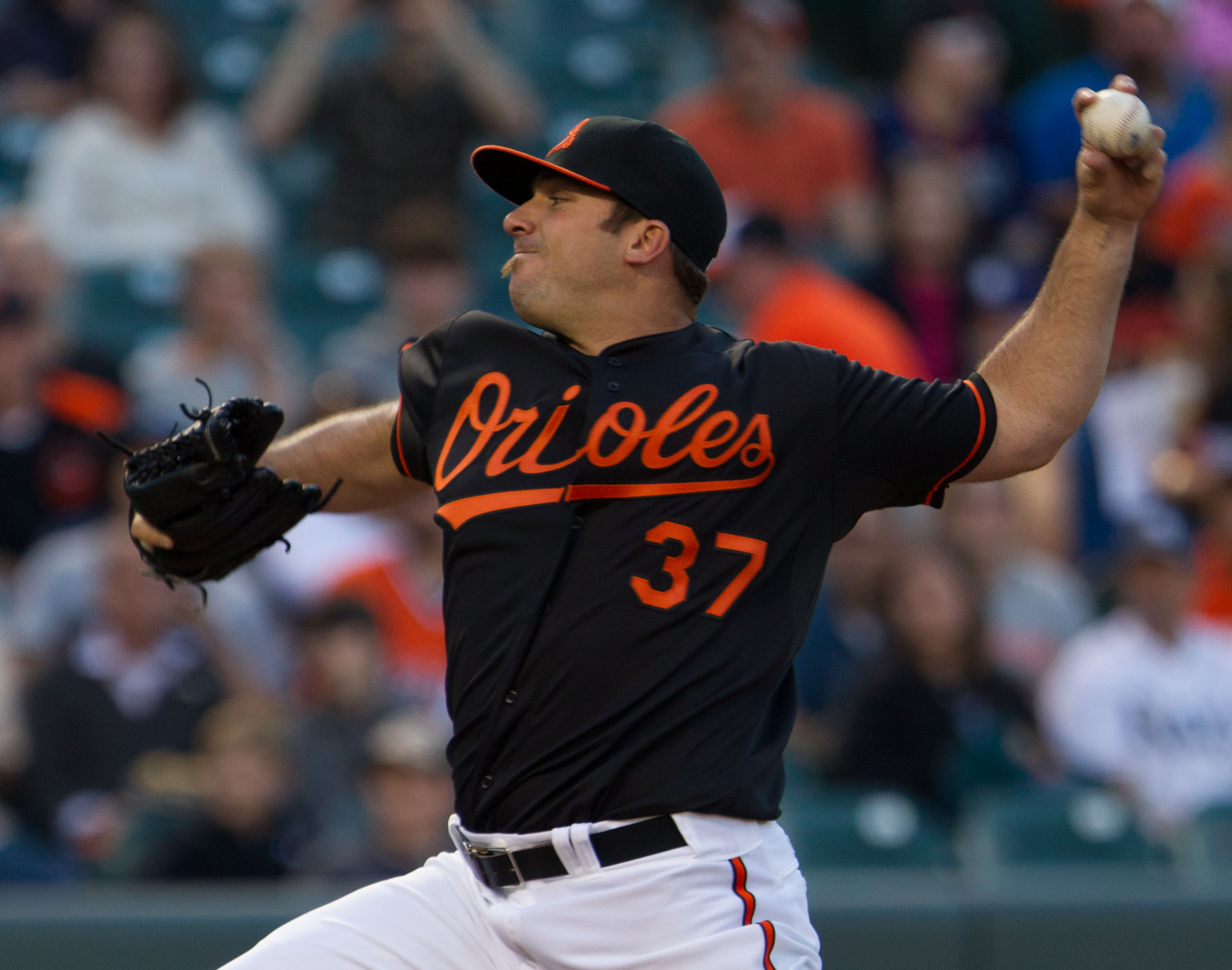
Eveland pitching for the Baltimore Orioles in 2012

He was traded from the Dodgers to the Baltimore Orioles on December 8, 2011. Eveland was designated for assignment on March 29, 2012. He was called up from Triple-A Norfolk on July 26.

=== Hanwha Eagles ===
On December 16, 2012, Eveland signed with the Hanwha Eagles in the KBO League for the 2013 season.

=== New York Mets ===
Eveland signed a minor league contract with the New York Mets on February 18, 2014. On June 1, the Mets selected Eveland's contract, adding him to their active roster. In 30 appearances for New York, he posted a 1-1 record and 2.63 ERA with 27 strikeouts and one save across 27 1/3 innings pitched. On October 31, Eveland was removed from the 40-man roster and sent outright to the Triple-A Las Vegas 51s; he subsequently rejected the assignment and elected free agency.

=== Boston Red Sox ===
Eveland agreed to a minor league contract with the Boston Red Sox on January 21, 2015. The deal was officially announced eight days later. On June 5, Eveland opted out of his minor league deal.

=== Atlanta Braves ===
Eveland signed a minor league deal with the Atlanta Braves on June 7, 2015. He was assigned to the Triple–A Gwinnett Braves. He was designated for assignment along with Nick Masset on July 5 to create room for David Carpenter, whose contract was purchased and Arodys Vizcaíno, who was activated from the restricted list.

=== Baltimore Orioles (second stint) ===
On July 17, 2015, Eveland signed a minor league contract with the Baltimore Orioles organization. He made 16 appearances (three starts) for the Triple-A Norfolk Tides, posting a 2-0 record and 2.37 ERA with 22 strikeouts across 30 1/3 innings pitched.

=== Tampa Bay Rays ===
On December 14, 2015, Eveland signed a minor league deal with the Tampa Bay Rays with an invitation to spring training. He made 33 appearances for the Rays in 2016, and pitched to a 9.00 ERA in 23 total innings. On October 11, 2016, Eveland was removed from the 40–man roster and sent outright to the Triple–A Durham Bulls, an assignment which he rejected in favor of free agency.

On November 2, 2016, Eveland signed a new minor league contract with the Rays. On March 15, 2017, Eveland was released by the Rays organization.

=== Pericos de Puebla ===
On May 9, 2017, Eveland signed with the Pericos de Puebla of the Mexican League. He made 12 appearances (two starts) for the Pericos, but struggled to a 1-2 record and 6.86 ERA with 15 strikeouts over 21 innings of work. Eveland was released by Puebla on June 16.

== Pitching style ==
Eveland throws a four-seam fastball, slider, changeup, and curveball. As of 2014, he began throwing more sliders and substituted his four-seam fastball with a two-seam fastball.

== Family ==
Eveland's brother, Kyle, was drafted by the Milwaukee Brewers in the 43rd round of the 2005 Major League Baseball draft.
