= Aaron Cunningham =

American baseball player (born 1986)

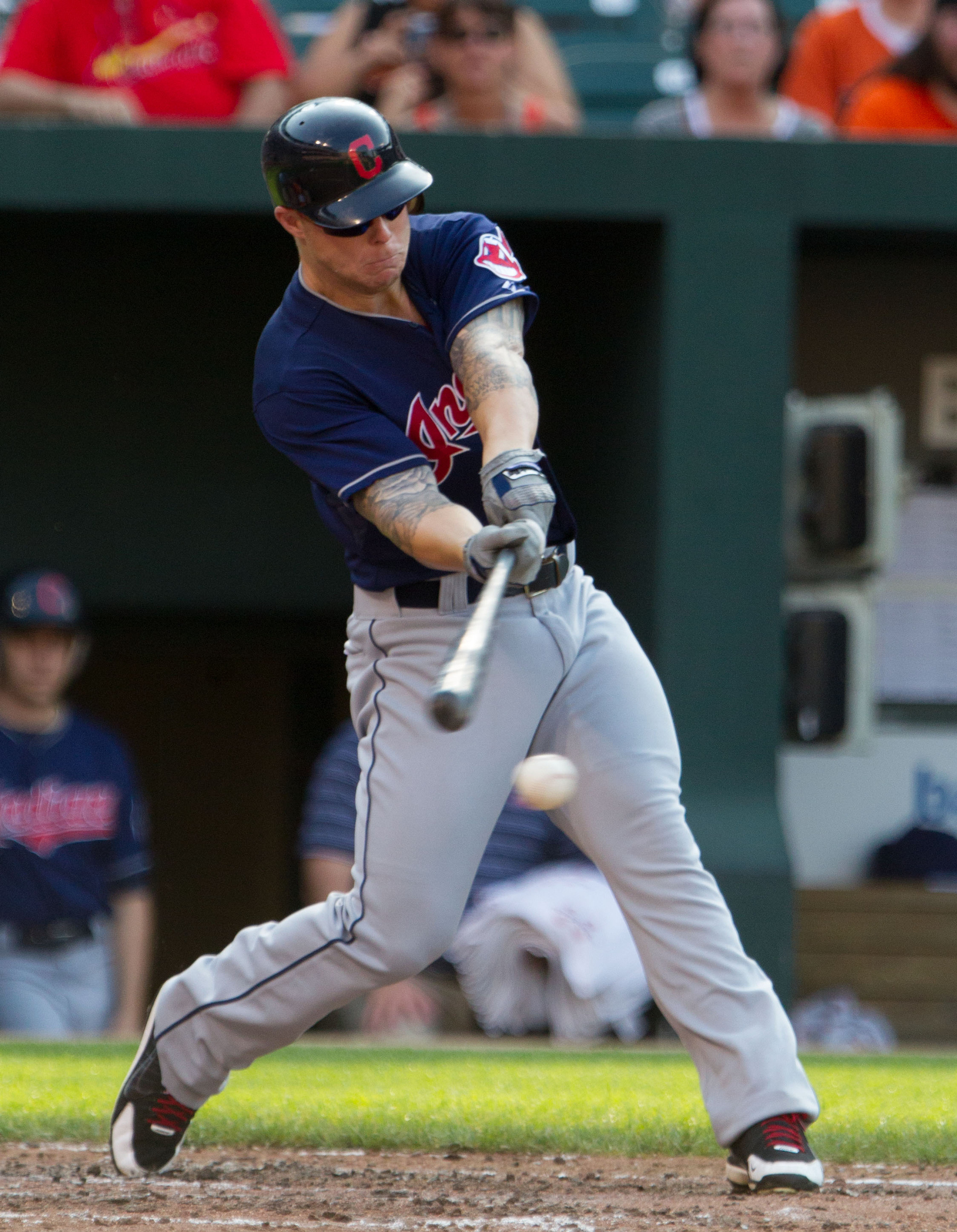
- Cunningham with the Cleveland Indians
- Outfielder
- Born: April 24, 1986 (age 40); Anchorage, Alaska, U.S.
- Batted: Right Threw: Right

MLB debut
- August 31, 2008, for the Oakland Athletics

Last appearance
- July 24, 2012, for the Cleveland Indians

MLB statistics
- Batting average: .219
- Home runs: 7
- Runs batted in: 51
- Stats at Baseball Reference

Teams
- Oakland Athletics (2008–2009); San Diego Padres (2010–2011); Cleveland Indians (2012)

Aaron Roe Ward Cunningham (born April 24, 1986) is an American former professional baseball outfielder. He played in Major League Baseball (MLB) for the Oakland Athletics, San Diego Padres, and Cleveland Indians.

== Professional career ==
=== Chicago White Sox ===
Cunningham was drafted by the Chicago White Sox in the sixth round of the 2005 Major League Baseball draft.

=== Arizona Diamondbacks ===
After two years in the White Sox organization, he was traded to the Arizona Diamondbacks for Danny Richar on June 16, 2007.

=== Oakland Athletics ===
On December 14, 2007, he was acquired by the Oakland Athletics in the trade that sent Dan Haren to the Diamondbacks. He was called up from the minors for the first time on August 30, 2008. Cunningham played in 22 games for Oakland in 2008 and 23 games in 2009, playing both left and right field.

=== San Diego Padres ===
On January 16, 2010, Cunningham and Scott Hairston were traded to the San Diego Padres for Kevin Kouzmanoff and Eric Sogard. In Cunningham's first start as a Padres player on June 15 he hit a grand slam to center field in his first at bat. In 2010, Cunningham split time between the majors and the Triple-A club. While in the majors, he served as a reserve corner outfielder, starting 30 games and hitting a career high .288 in 132 at-bats. In 2011, Cunningham again split time between the minors and majors, making 20 starts with the Padres at the corner outfield positions. He hit .329 in 87 games with the Triple-A Tucson Padres, but only .178 in 90 at-bats with the big league club.

=== Cleveland Indians ===
On December 16, 2011, Cunningham was traded to the Cleveland Indians for minor league pitcher Cory Burns. Cunningham broke camp with the big league club in 2012 and played in a career high 72 games, starting 21 games across all three outfield positions. He was mostly used as a late-inning defensive replacement and batted .175 in 97 at-bats. On July 24 he laid down a successful suicide squeeze bunt to score the winning run in a game against Detroit. Cunningham was designated for assignment on July 25 and he finished the year with the Triple-A Columbus Clippers.

=== Texas Rangers ===
On November 12, 2012, Cunningham signed a minor league deal with the Texas Rangers with an invitation to spring training.

=== Chicago Cubs ===
On November 15, 2013, Cunningham signed a minor league contract with the Chicago Cubs organization.

=== Arizona Diamondbacks (second stint) ===
Cunningham signed a minor league deal with the Arizona Diamondbacks in March 2014 but was released a few months later. He re-signed on September 2. On March 24, 2015, Cunningham was released by the Diamondbacks.
