= 2008 Toronto Blue Jays season =

2008 Toronto Blue Jays
- League: American League
- Division: East
- Ballpark: Rogers Centre
- City: Toronto
- Record: 86–76 (.531)
- Divisional place: 4th
- Owners: Rogers; Paul Godfrey (CEO)
- General managers: J. P. Ricciardi
- Managers: John Gibbons, Cito Gaston
- Television: Rogers Sportsnet (Jamie Campbell, Pat Tabler, Rance Mulliniks, Darrin Fletcher, Sam Cosentino (Field Reporter)) (100 Games) CBC (Jim Hughson, Rance Mulliniks, Jesse Barfield) (24 Games) TSN (Rod Black, Pat Tabler) (20 Games)
- Radio: 590 AM

The 2008 Toronto Blue Jays season, the team's 32nd year of existence, saw the Blue Jays finish in fourth place in the American League East with a record of 86 wins and 76 losses for a .531 winning percentage, thus making this season the third consecutive winning season for the Jays, as well as being the highest win–loss record since their 2006 season.

== Off-season ==
General Manager J. P. Ricciardi maintained through the off-season that he was content with the Blue Jays' roster as it was. Nevertheless, he made a number of moves, two of which would likely have a significant effect on the team in the 2008 season. The team's acquisition of all-star shortstop David Eckstein was met with a mixed reception from fans and critics. Eckstein's role on the team would displace two of Toronto's most popular players from their regular roles; Reed Johnson as leadoff hitter and John McDonald as starting shortstop.

Eckstein was signed to fill the leadoff spot in the order which was void of a true leadoff man for much of 2007 due to the injury to Johnson. Johnson was released by the Blue Jays on March 23 and the LF position was given to Shannon Stewart who split time with Matt Stairs.

The other major move by the club in the off-season was the trade of third baseman Troy Glaus to the Cardinals for David Eckstein's teammate, Scott Rolen. The move was generally seen to be a major risk to both parties, as both players were dealing with injuries over the past several seasons. The move was also noted as being somewhat redundant, given the various similarities between the two players. Both hit for power, though Glaus slightly more so, both were approximately the same age, and both were prone to injury. Rolen was, however, a significantly better defender than Glaus.

The Blue Jays played their 5000th franchise regular season game on Friday July 25 against the Seattle Mariners.

== Other acquisitions ==
The Blue Jays also signed catcher Rod Barajas (who split time with Gregg Zaun) and Marco Scutaro, who played third base for most of the games for the beginning of the season, until Scott Rolen returned from his injury in May.

Players signed to minor league deals:

- Armando Benítez
- Shannon Stewart
- John Parrish
- Shawn Camp
- Buck Coats
- Lance Carter
- Mike Gosling

On April 20, 2008, the Jays released veteran DH Frank Thomas. Although the Jays said it was due to a weak performance, Thomas stated it was probably because he only needed a little more than 300 at-bats to put his 2010 option year in effect. General Manager J. P. Ricciardi stated that this move was because the Blue Jays were falling behind early and Thomas was not producing. Ricciardi needed someone who could hit home runs and drive in RBIs from Thomas' spot in the batting order.

== Expectations ==
The Blue Jays were picked by many experts to contend for a playoff spot in the agonizing AL East. The Blue Jays were also expected to challenge the Yankees and Red Sox in 2005, 2006 and 2007. Though they finished 2006 in second place, 2007 was an injury riddled season for the Jays, resulting in another mediocre third-place finish. The key to the Blue Jays' success in 2008 would be to stay healthy and hit well. Another repeat of 2007 would mean likely another mediocre season. Key players such as Alex Ríos, Vernon Wells, Scott Rolen, David Eckstein, Roy Halladay, A. J. Burnett and B. J. Ryan needed to stay virtually healthy and produce as they are capable of, if the Jays wished to seriously challenge or dethrone the New York Yankees, Boston Red Sox, Detroit Tigers and Cleveland Indians for a playoff spot. Ultimately, the Blue Jays did not meet the expectations of contending and finished with a less than impressive season record.

== Regular season ==
=== Season standings ===
AL East
| Team | W | L | Pct. | GB | Home | Road |
|---|---|---|---|---|---|---|
| Tampa Bay Rays | 97 | 65 | .599 | — | 57‍–‍24 | 40‍–‍41 |
| Boston Red Sox | 95 | 67 | .586 | 2 | 56‍–‍25 | 39‍–‍42 |
| New York Yankees | 89 | 73 | .549 | 8 | 48‍–‍33 | 41‍–‍40 |
| Toronto Blue Jays | 86 | 76 | .531 | 11 | 47‍–‍34 | 39‍–‍42 |
| Baltimore Orioles | 68 | 93 | .422 | 28½ | 37‍–‍43 | 31‍–‍50 |

=== Record vs. opponents ===
2008 American League record Source: MLB Standings Grid – 2008
| Team | BAL | BOS | CWS | CLE | DET | KC | LAA | MIN | NYY | OAK | SEA | TB | TEX | TOR | NL |
|---|---|---|---|---|---|---|---|---|---|---|---|---|---|---|---|
| Baltimore | – | 6–12 | 4–5 | 4–4 | 4–3 | 5–3 | 3–6 | 3–3 | 7–11 | 0–5 | 8–2 | 3–15 | 4–5 | 6–12 | 11–7 |
| Boston | 12–6 | – | 4–3 | 5–1 | 5–2 | 6–1 | 1–8 | 4–3 | 9–9 | 6–4 | 6–3 | 8–10 | 9–1 | 9–9 | 11–7 |
| Chicago | 5–4 | 3–4 | – | 11–7 | 12–6 | 12–6 | 5–5 | 9–10 | 2–5 | 5–4 | 5–1 | 4–6 | 3–3 | 1–7 | 12–6 |
| Cleveland | 4–4 | 1–5 | 7–11 | – | 11–7 | 10–8 | 4–5 | 8–10 | 4–3 | 5–4 | 4–5 | 5–2 | 6–4 | 6–1 | 6–12 |
| Detroit | 3–4 | 2–5 | 6–12 | 7–11 | – | 7–11 | 3–6 | 7–11 | 4–2 | 3–6 | 7–3 | 3–4 | 6–3 | 3–5 | 13–5 |
| Kansas City | 3–5 | 1–6 | 6–12 | 8–10 | 11–7 | – | 2–3 | 6–12 | 5–5 | 6–3 | 7–2 | 3–5 | 2–7 | 2–5 | 13–5 |
| Los Angeles | 6–3 | 8–1 | 5–5 | 5–4 | 6–3 | 3–2 | – | 5–3 | 7–3 | 10–9 | 14–5 | 3–6 | 12–7 | 6–3 | 10–8 |
| Minnesota | 3–3 | 3–4 | 10–9 | 10–8 | 11–7 | 12–6 | 3–5 | – | 4–6 | 5–5 | 5–4 | 3–3 | 5–5 | 0–6 | 14–4 |
| New York | 11–7 | 9–9 | 5–2 | 3–4 | 2–4 | 5–5 | 3–7 | 6–4 | – | 5–1 | 7–2 | 11–7 | 3–4 | 9–9 | 10–8 |
| Oakland | 5–0 | 4–6 | 4–5 | 4–5 | 6–3 | 3–6 | 9–10 | 5–5 | 1–5 | - | 10–9 | 3–6 | 7–12 | 4–6 | 10–8 |
| Seattle | 2–8 | 3–6 | 1–5 | 5–4 | 3–7 | 2–7 | 5–14 | 4–5 | 2–7 | 9–10 | – | 3–4 | 8–11 | 5–4 | 9–9 |
| Tampa Bay | 15–3 | 10–8 | 6–4 | 2–5 | 4–3 | 5–3 | 6–3 | 3–3 | 7–11 | 6–3 | 4–3 | – | 6–3 | 11–7 | 12–6 |
| Texas | 5–4 | 1–9 | 3–3 | 4–6 | 3–6 | 7–2 | 7–12 | 5–5 | 4–3 | 12–7 | 11–8 | 3–6 | – | 4–4 | 10–8 |
| Toronto | 12–6 | 9–9 | 7–1 | 1–6 | 5–3 | 5–2 | 3–6 | 6–0 | 9–9 | 6–4 | 4–5 | 7–11 | 4–4 | – | 8–10 |

=== Detailed record ===
updated to games played September 28, 2008

| Team | Home | Away | Total | Gms Left |
|---|---|---|---|---|
AL East
| Baltimore Orioles | 6–3 | 6–3 | 12–6 | – |
| Boston Red Sox | 5–4 | 4–5 | 9–9 | – |
| New York Yankees | 5–4 | 4–5 | 9–9 | – |
| Tampa Bay Rays | 5–4 | 2–7 | 7–11 | – |
| | 21–15 | 16–20 | 37–35 | – |
AL Central
| Chicago White Sox | 4–0 | 3–1 | 7–1 | – |
| Cleveland Indians | 0–3 | 1–3 | 1–6 | – |
| Detroit Tigers | 2–2 | 3–1 | 5–3 | – |
| Kansas City Royals | 4–0 | 1–2 | 5–2 | – |
| Minnesota Twins | 3–0 | 3–0 | 6–0 | – |
| | 13–5 | 11–7 | 24–12 | – |
AL West
| Los Angeles Angels | 1–2 | 2–4 | 3–6 | – |
| Oakland Athletics | 4–3 | 2–1 | 6–4 | – |
| Seattle Mariners | 3–3 | 1–2 | 4–5 | – |
| Texas Rangers | 0–2 | 4–2 | 4–4 | – |
| | 8–10 | 9–9 | 17–19 | – |
National League
| Atlanta Braves | 2–1 | – | 2–1 | – |
| Chicago Cubs | 1–2 | – | 1–2 | – |
| Cincinnati Reds | 2–1 | – | 2–1 | – |
| Milwaukee Brewers | – | 0–3 | 0–3 | – |
| Philadelphia Phillies | – | 2–1 | 2–1 | – |
| Pittsburgh Pirates | – | 1–2 | 1–2 | – |
| | 5–4 | 3–6 | 8–10 | – |

| Month | Games | Won | Lost |
|---|---|---|---|
| April | 28 | 11 | 17 |
| May | 30 | 20 | 10 |
| June | 26 | 10 | 16 |
| July | 24 | 13 | 11 |
| August | 28 | 16 | 12 |
| September | 26 | 16 | 10 |
| | 162 | 86 | 76 |

| Manager | Games | Won | Lost |
|---|---|---|---|
| John Gibbons | 74 | 35 | 39 |
| Cito Gaston | 88 | 51 | 37 |
| | 162 | 86 | 76 |

== Season summary ==
=== April ===
The Blue Jays finished the first week of the season by taking 4 out of 6 games against AL East powerhouses New York and Boston, including a sweep of the Red Sox. Following the first two series, however, they faced a 4–4 Oakland Athletics team and promptly got swept at home, including two close one-run losses. Closer Jeremy Accardo blew a save in the second game and took the loss for the second straight night after the A's scored in the ninth inning in the first game against him. Following the sweep by Oakland, the Jays headed out on the road and swept the Texas Rangers at Rangers Ballpark in Arlington, which had been considered a house of horrors of sorts as Toronto had lost 16 of its last 19 games there. Before the third game of the series, pitcher B. J. Ryan was activated from the disabled list and reinstated as the team's closer. He went on to save the final game. The Jays completed their road trip by splitting a short two-game series with the Baltimore Orioles.

The Blue Jays returned home to face Texas for a pair of games and lost both contests, despite an incredible pitching performance by the Toronto relief corps in the first game and a complete game from ace Roy Halladay in the second. In the first game, despite the energy provided by escaping dangerous situations (the Rangers left the bases loaded three times in extra innings and failed to score), the Blue Jays' offense struggled and failed to respond. Manager John Gibbons used up all the relievers and had to send starter A. J. Burnett to face the Rangers in the 14th inning, where he went on to give up two runs and took the loss.

After splitting a four-game set with the surprisingly underachieving Detroit Tigers, Toronto left for a nine-game road trip, facing the Tampa Bay Rays, Kansas City Royals, and Boston Red Sox. The sojourn was completely forgettable, with the Jays being swept three straight by the Rays at Disney's Wide World of Sports Complex in Orlando and dropping two out of three to the Royals at Kauffman Stadium. Prior to the Royals series, the Blue Jays activated third baseman Scott Rolen from the disabled list, and he hit his first home run in a Jays uniform in the third game, which the Jays took behind Jesse Litsch to snap a six-game losing streak (dating back to the last game of the Detroit series). However, the Blue Jays then travelled to Boston and closed out April by losing the first two games against the Red Sox in heartbreaking fashion, with Halladay and Scott Downs respectively giving up walk-off hits to give the BoSox narrow one-run victories. For Halladay, it was his fourth complete game in a row, but a lack of hitting by the Toronto lineup doomed him to a loss. The Blue Jays lost 11 of their last 14 games in April, and manager Gibbons received a lot of criticism for his team's performance from fans due to the lack of manufacturing runs and a seeming lack of motivation; some suggested that it may be time for a managerial change.

=== May ===
Toronto salvaged the rubber match of the Boston series on May 1, but not without some controversy. After Burnett and Jesse Carlson shut out the Red Sox for eight innings, B. J. Ryan was called in to close out the game. Coco Crisp popped out to right to seemingly end the tilt, but second base umpire Bruce Dreckman called Ryan for a balk and ordered the game to continue. Crisp followed with a single to right, moving Brandon Moss to third. However, Ryan vindicated himself with a strikeout of Jed Lowrie to end the game for good.

Building off the momentum, the Jays came back home and completed a four-game sweep of the Chicago White Sox (the first time they had swept a four-game set since 2003). The Toronto pitching kept Chicago at bay, shutting them out twice, while Vernon Wells and Matt Stairs in particular came through with clutch hits against ChiSox pitching. Despite hopes that the woeful offense would come around, the Blue Jays then dropped two of three to the visiting Rays. In the first contest, starting shortstop David Eckstein left the game due to a hip injury, and his backup John McDonald followed him a short time later with a sprained ankle; both were eventually put on the 15-day disabled list. The last game with Tampa seemingly symbolized Toronto's struggles – after trailing for eight innings, they came back to tie in the bottom of the ninth, only to come up empty the next inning and waste a leadoff triple by Alex Ríos. In the 13th, Carl Crawford came through with a sacrifice fly off Shawn Camp, and a few batters later Dioner Navarro hit a grand slam, putting the game out of reach for the Jays.

Prior to a road series in Cleveland, general manager Ricciardi attempted to pick up the team's sagging offense and deepen the bench by signing free-agent outfielder Brad Wilkerson and acquiring outfielder Kevin Mench in exchange for cash considerations. However, the Jays still lost three of four to the Indians, with Vernon Wells breaking his wrist trying to make a diving catch in the first game and missing the next 6–8 weeks. Despite the blow dealt by the absence of Wells, the victory in the last game of the Cleveland series seemed to spur the Jays' bats back to life somewhat, as they proceeded to sweep the Twins in Minnesota and then take two of three from the Phillies in their first interleague series of the year. Returning home, Toronto lost the first two games of a close three-game set to the Los Angeles Angels of Anaheim but won the last game, using it as a springboard for a four-game sweep of the Royals that brought them three games above .500 for the first time in the season. The Jays then took off for the West Coast, splitting the first two tense games in Oakland before blowing out the A's 12–0 in the final game. The momentum continued in Anaheim when the Jays pounded the Angels 10–4 in the first game, but lost a 3–2 nail-biter in 10 innings in the second game. Despite the tight loss to the Angels, Toronto enjoyed a remarkable recovery from their disastrous April, winning 20 games, just one shy of the club record for the most wins in a single month.

=== June ===
On Friday June 20, 2008, after losing 5 in a row and falling 10.5 games behind the Boston Red Sox, the Blue Jays replaced John Gibbons with Cito Gaston. Cito is the only manager to lead the Blue Jays to World Series victories in 1992 over the Braves and won again 1993 over the Phillies.

=== July ===
On Tuesday July 8, 2008, the Blue Jays won their first game in walk-off fashion of the season, and marking the first time since September 17, 2007 that the Jays won a walk-off-style game. The win was a 7–6 victory over the visiting Baltimore Orioles, and the walk-off win was achieved by an RBI single from Scott Rolen, bringing Alex Ríos to score, after stealing two bases via a strikeout by Vernon Wells before Rolen's at-bat in the bottom of the 9th inning. Rios earlier in the bottom of the 7th inning, scored a three-run triple (his 3rd triple of the season), bringing the score to 6–5 Baltimore. Immediately afterwards, Vernon Wells hit an RBI single (his 2nd single of the night), bringing Rios home and tying the game 6–6 before the walk-off finisher two innings later.

Just 2 days later, on July 10, the Blue Jays won their second walk-off victory of the season, against the Baltimore Orioles. The win resulted in the Orioles being swept by the Jays, the first time since late May that the Jays won a sweep; against the Kansas City Royals. The Jays won 6–5. Marco Scutaro came as the first batter of the bottom of the 9th, as a pinch hitter for Matt Stairs; he struck out. Scutaro was followed by Rod Barajas who fired a single into right field and was subsequently replaced with pinch runner John McDonald, who ran to 2nd base. Then came Scott Rolen who fired the ball deep into right field, landing near the foul line and resulting in a double, sending Rolen to 2nd and McDonald to 3rd. Gregg Zaun was intentionally walked by Orioles' closer George Sherrill thus loading the bases. This was followed by a sacrifice fly from Lyle Overbay, scoring McDonald and tying the game at 5–5. Lastly, Adam Lind came up and launched a ground ball single off to right field, past the glove of Aubrey Huff and placed near right fielder Nick Markakis. Rolen runs from 2nd base and makes it to home plate, giving the Blue Jays the sweep.

=== August ===
On August 28, the Blue Jays designated DH Matt Stairs for assignment shortly after their 3–2 loss against the Tampa Bay Rays. He was then traded to the Philadelphia Phillies, who went on to win the World Series.

After the Jays won their final game against the Yankees at Yankee Stadium 6–2 on August 31, shortstop David Eckstein was traded to the Arizona Diamondbacks for a right-handed pitcher.

=== September ===
The Jays swept the Minnesota Twins from September 2–4, marking the second straight sweep of the Twins for the Jays this season and also the first time since several years ago that they swept one team three times in a row, since the Jays swept the Twins in July 2007 in addition to the two sweeps this year.

The Jays beat the Rays on September 5, 6–4 and then on September 6, they won their first series victory over the Rays this season, winning the game 7–4 due to a walk-off grand slam by catcher Gregg Zaun at the bottom of 13th inning. As a result, three records occurred: 1. That walk-off grand slam was the second in franchise history (the first was by George Bell on September 4, 1988) as well as being the franchise's first walk-off grand slam to occur in extra innings. 2. The win was the Jays seventh straight win, the first time this happened since September 2002. 3. With the win, the Jays were 5–0 so far for the month of September, marking the first time since September 1998 that the Jays had that record at the beginning of that month.

On September 7, the Jays won the final game against the Rays 1–0, thus sweeping them. David Purcey got the win, going 8 solid innings, and Jesse Carlson got the save, his 2nd of the season. With this win, the Jays now have their longest winning streak since April 1999. The sweep of the Rays was also the first time in franchise history that they swept the Rays.

The Jays opened a four-game series with the Chicago White Sox by winning a rain-postponed double-header on September 9. A.J.Burnett got his 17th victory of the season by taking a no-hitter into the 6th inning before giving up a run. Jays win 3–1. Jesse Litsch pitched a solid 7 innings and records his fifth win since being recalled from AAA. Marco Scutaro leads off the game with his 2nd career lead-off home run. Litsch again receives much run support and the Jays win 8–2.

On September 12, the Jays went into Fenway Park to face the AL Wild Card Leaders, The Boston Red Sox. The Jays promptly lost 3 out of 4 in that weekend series, ultimately dropping them out of the AL Wild Card contention.

On September 18, the Jays scored a 3–2 victory over the Baltimore Orioles, moving their record to 82–71. The victory secured a third consecutive winning season for the team, something which they have not accomplished since 1998–2000.

On September 25, versus the New York Yankees, Roy Halladay pitched a complete game six-hitter for his 20th win of the season, the first time he did so since his Cy Young Award-winning 2003 season. Halladay became only the 2nd Blue Jays pitcher to have pitched two 20+ win seasons, after Roger Clemens did so in 1997 and 1998. With that win, Halladay also became the first pitcher to have a 5–0 record against the Yankees in a season, since Luis Tiant accomplished the feat in 1974.

=== 2008 draft picks ===
The 2008 MLB draft was held on June 5–6.

| Round | Pick | Player | Position | College/School | Nationality | Signed |
|---|---|---|---|---|---|---|
| 1 | 17 | David Cooper | 1B | California | (United States) | 2008–06–10 |
| 2 | 63 | Kenny Wilson | OF | Sickles High School (FL) | (United States) | 2008–06–10 |
| 3 | 95 | Andrew Liebel | RHP | Long Beach State | (United States) | 2008–07–14 |
| 4 | 129 | Mark Sobolewski | 3B | Miami (FL) | (United States) | 2008–07–03 |
| 5 | 159 | Tyler Pastornicky | SS | The Pendleton School (FL) | (United States) | 2008–06–10 |
| 6 | 189 | Markus Brisker | OF | Winter Haven High School (FL) | (United States) | 2008–06–10 |
| 7 | 219 | Eric Thames | OF | Pepperdine | (United States) | 2008–06–10 |
| 8 | 249 | Evan Crawford | LHP | Auburn | (United States) | 2008–06–10 |
| 9 | 279 | A. J. Jimenez | C | Discipulos De Cristo (PR) | (Puerto Rico) | 2008–06–10 |
| 10 | 309 | Danny Farquhar | RHP | Louisiana–Lafayette | (United States) | 2008–06–30 |

=== Roster ===
2008 Toronto Blue Jays
Roster
| Pitchers: 49 Jeremy Accardo; 48 Armando Benítez; 34 A. J. Burnett; 57 Shawn Camp; 43,39 Jesse Carlson; 37 Scott Downs; 54 Jason Frasor; 32 Roy Halladay; 22 Brandon League; 51 Jesse Litsch; 28 Shaun Marcum; 29 Dustin McGowan; 31 John Parrish; 25 David Purcey; 48 Scott Richmond; 52 B. J. Ryan; 56 Brian Tallet; 59 Randy Wells; 40 Brian Wolfe | Catchers: 20 Rod Barajas; 7 Curtis Thigpen; 9 Gregg Zaun; Infielders: 23 José Bautista; 11 David Eckstein; 2 Aaron Hill; 1 Joe Inglett; 18 Héctor Luna; 6 John McDonald; 17 Lyle Overbay; 33 Scott Rolen; 19 Marco Scutaro; 4 Jorge Velandia | Outfielders: 21 Buck Coats; 26 Adam Lind; 36 Kevin Mench; 15 Alex Ríos; 45 Travis Snider; 24 Matt Stairs; 23,42 Shannon Stewart; 10,42 Vernon Wells; 35 Brad Wilkerson; Other batters: 14 Robinzon Díaz; 35,42 Frank Thomas | Manager: 43 Cito Gaston; 5 John Gibbons; Coaches: 38 Brad Arnsberg (pitching); 55 Brian Butterfield (bench); 47 Gary Denbo (hitting); 16 Nick Leyva (third base); 41 Dwayne Murphy (first base); 45 Marty Pevey (third base); 18 Gene Tenace (hitting); 53 Bruce Walton (bullpen); 12 Ernie Whitt (first base) |

=== Game log ===
2008 Game Log
March: 0–0

| # | Date | Opponent | Score | Win | Loss | Save | Attendance | Record | GBL |
|---|---|---|---|---|---|---|---|---|---|
| – | March 31 | @ Yankees | Postponed (rain) Rescheduled for April 1 | | | | | | |

April: 11–17 (Home: 5–7; Away: 6–10)

| # | Date | Opponent | Score | Win | Loss | Save | Attendance | Record | GBL |
|---|---|---|---|---|---|---|---|---|---|
| 1 | April 1 | @ Yankees | 3–2 | Wang (1–0) | Halladay (0–1) | Rivera (1) | 55,112 | 0–1 | 1 |
| 2 | April 2 | @ Yankees | 5–2 | Burnett (1–0) | Mussina (0–1) | Accardo (1) | 48,544 | 1–1 | 1 |
| 3 | April 3 | @ Yankees | 3–2 | Chamberlain (1–0) | Wolfe (0–1) | Rivera (2) | 47,785 | 1–2 | 1½ |
| 4 | April 4 | Red Sox | 6–3 | Marcum (1–0) | Aardsma (0–1) | Accardo (2) | 50,171 | 2–2 | ½ |
| 5 | April 5 | Red Sox | 10–2 | Litsch (1–0) | Buchholz (0–1) | | 35,238 | 3–2 | ½ |
| 6 | April 6 | Red Sox | 7–4 | Halladay (1–1) | Beckett (0–1) | Accardo (3) | 30,114 | 4–2 | ½ |
| 7 | April 8 | Athletics | 9–8 | Embree (1–1) | Accardo (0–1) | Street (1) | 31,336 | 4–3 | 2 |
| 8 | April 9 | Athletics | 6–3 | Hernández (1–0) | Accardo (0–2) | Street (2) | 16,102 | 4–4 | 2½ |
| 9 | April 10 | Athletics | 3–2 (12) | Devine (1–0) | League (0–1) | Foulke (1) | 16,521 | 4–5 | 2 |
| 10 | April 11 | @ Rangers | 8–5 | Litsch (2–0) | Padilla (1–1) | Downs (1) | 24,209 | 5–5 | 1 |
| 11 | April 12 | @ Rangers | 4–1 | Halladay (2–1) | Mendoza (0–1) | | 34,960 | 6–5 | 1 |
| 12 | April 13 | @ Rangers | 5–4 (10) | Carlson (1–0) | Nippert (0–1) | Ryan (1) | 21,515 | 7–5 | 0 |
| 13 | April 14 | @ Orioles | 4–3 | Albers (2–0) | McGowan (0–1) | Sherrill (6) | 11,510 | 7–6 | 1 |
| 14 | April 15 | @ Orioles | 11–3 | Marcum (2–0) | Trachsel (1–2) | | 15,017 | 8–6 | ½ |
| 15 | April 16 | Rangers | 7–5 (14) | Nippert (1–1) | Burnett (1–1) | Wilson (4) | 15,686 | 8–7 | ½ |
| 16 | April 17 | Rangers | 4–1 | Padilla (2–1) | Halladay (2–2) | Wilson (5) | 15,809 | 8–8 | 1½ |
| 17 | April 18 | Tigers | 8–4 | Rogers (1–3) | Accardo (0–3) | | 24,294 | 8–9 | 2½ |
| 18 | April 19 | Tigers | 3–2 | McGowan (1–1) | Bonderman (1–2) | Ryan (2) | 31,052 | 9–9 | 2½ |
| 19 | April 20 | Tigers | 5–3 | Burnett (2–1) | Robertson (0–2) | Accardo (4) | 30,139 | 10–9 | 2½ |
| 20 | April 21 | Tigers | 5–1 | Galarraga (2–0) | Marcum (2–1) | | 25,287 | 10–10 | 3½ |
| 21 | April 22 | @ Rays † | 6–4 | Shields (2–1) | Litsch (2–1) | Percival (2) | 8,269 | 10–11 | 4½ |
| 22 | April 23 | @ Rays † | 5–3 | Hammel (2–1) | Halladay (2–3) | Percival (3) | 8,989 | 10–12 | 4½ |
| 23 | April 24 | @ Rays † | 5–3 | Sonnanstine (3–1) | McGowan (1–2) | Percival (4) | 9,540 | 10–13 | 4½ |
| 24 | April 25 | @ Royals | 8–4 | Núñez (2–0) | Burnett (2–2) | | 22,561 | 10–14 | 4½ |
| 25 | April 26 | @ Royals | 2–1 | Hochevar (1–1) | Marcum (2–2) | Soria (6) | 24,078 | 10–15 | 4½ |
| 26 | April 27 | @ Royals | 5–2 | Litsch (3–1) | Meche (1–4) | Carlson (1) | 13,998 | 11–15 | 3½ |
| 27 | April 29 | @ Red Sox | 1–0 | Papelbon (1–0) | Halladay (2–4) | | 37,215 | 11–16 | 4½ |
| 28 | April 30 | @ Red Sox | 2–1 | Papelbon (2–0) | Downs (0–1) | | 37,710 | 11–17 | 5½ |

May: 20–10 (Home: 10–4; Away: 10–6)

| # | Date | Opponent | Score | Win | Loss | Save | Attendance | Record | GBL |
|---|---|---|---|---|---|---|---|---|---|
| 29 | May 1 | @ Red Sox | 3–0 | Burnett (3–2) | Wakefield (2–1) | Ryan (3) | 37,821 | 12–17 | 4½ |
| 30 | May 2 | White Sox | 2–0 | Marcum (3–2) | Buehrle (1–3) | Downs (2) | 21,057 | 13–17 | 4½ |
| 31 | May 3 | White Sox | 5–2 | Litsch (4–1) | Danks (2–3) | Ryan (4) | 27,778 | 14–17 | 4½ |
| 32 | May 4 | White Sox | 4–3 | Halladay (3–4) | Contreras (2–3) | Downs (3) | 26,247 | 15–17 | 4½ |
| 33 | May 5 | White Sox | 1–0 | McGowan (2–2) | Vázquez (3–3) | Ryan (5) | 16,602 | 16–17 | 4½ |
| 34 | May 6 | Rays | 5–4 | Sonnanstine (5–1) | Burnett (3–3) | Percival (7) | 30,397 | 16–18 | 5½ |
| 35 | May 7 | Rays | 6–2 | Marcum (4–2) | Garza (1–1) | | 19,276 | 17–18 | 4½ |
| 36 | May 8 | Rays | 8–3 (13) | Howell (1–0) | Camp (0–1) | | 21,118 | 17–19 | 5½ |
| 37 | May 9 | @ Indians | 6–1 | Sabathia (2–5) | Halladay (3–5) | | 26,472 | 17–20 | 5½ |
| 38 | May 10 | @ Indians | 12–0 | Laffey (1–2) | McGowan (2–3) | | 38,141 | 17–21 | 6½ |
| – | May 11 | @ Indians | Postponed (rain) Rescheduled for May 12 | | | | | | |
| 39 | May 12 | @ Indians | 3–0 | Carmona (4–1) | Burnett (3–4) | | | 17–22 | - |
| 40 | May 12 | @ Indians | 3–0 (10) | Ryan (1–0) | Betancourt (1–2) | Downs (4) | 16,045 | 18–22 | 5½ |
| 41 | May 13 | @ Twins | 5–3 | Litsch (5–1) | Slowey (0–3) | Ryan (6) | 18,110 | 19–22 | 5 |
| 42 | May 14 | @ Twins | 6–5 | Halladay (4–5) | Bonser (2–5) | Downs (5) | 21,026 | 20–22 | 4 |
| 43 | May 15 | @ Twins | 3–2 (11) | Camp (1–1) | Crain (1–2) | Ryan (7) | 18,701 | 21–22 | 4 |
| 44 | May 16 | @ Phillies | 10–3 | Moyer (3–3) | Purcey (0–1) | | 36,600 | 21–23 | 5 |
| 45 | May 17 | @ Phillies | 6–3 | Burnett (4–4) | Eaton (0–2) | Ryan (8) | 42,604 | 22–23 | 4 |
| 46 | May 18 | @ Phillies | 6–5 | Frasor (1–0) | Seánez (2–3) | Ryan (9) | 42,858 | 23–23 | 4 |
| 47 | May 20 | Angels | 3–1 | Lackey (1–0) | McGowan (2–4) | Rodríguez (18) | 31,487 | 23–24 | 5½ |
| 48 | May 21 | Angels | 4–3 | Garland (5–3) | Marcum (4–3) | Rodríguez (19) | 20,163 | 23–25 | 6½ |
| 49 | May 22 | Angels | 4–3 | Burnett (5–4) | Santana (6–2) | Ryan (10) | 22,007 | 24–25 | 6½ |
| 50 | May 23 | Royals | 7–1 | Halladay (5–5) | Greinke (5–2) | | 24,207 | 25–25 | 5½ |
| 51 | May 24 | Royals | 6–0 | Litsch (6–1) | Hochevar (3–4) | | 28,162 | 26–25 | 4½ |
| 52 | May 25 | Royals | 3–1 | McGowan (3–4) | Meche (3–7) | Ryan (11) | 29,315 | 27–25 | 4 |
| 53 | May 26 | Royals | 7–2 | Marcum (5–3) | Tomko (2–6) | | 23,157 | 28–25 | 4 |
| 54 | May 27 | @ Athletics | 3–1 | Smith (3–4) | Burnett (5–5) | Street (12) | 10,635 | 28–26 | 4 |
| 55 | May 28 | @ Athletics | 2–1 | Halladay (6–5) | Foulke (0–1) | Ryan (12) | 17,460 | 29–26 | 4 |
| 56 | May 29 | @ Athletics | 12–0 | Litsch (7–1) | Eveland (4–4) | | 21,862 | 30–26 | 3 |
| 57 | May 30 | @ Angels | 10–4 | McGowan (4–4) | Weaver (4–6) | | 42,577 | 31–26 | 3 |
| 58 | May 31 | @ Angels | 3–2 (10) | Shields (3–1) | Tallet (0–1) | | 43,645 | 31–27 | 4 |

June: 10–16 (Home: 7–8; Away: 3–8)

| # | Date | Opponent | Score | Win | Loss | Save | Attendance | Record | GBL |
|---|---|---|---|---|---|---|---|---|---|
| 59 | June 1 | @ Angels | 4–3 | Arredondo (2–0) | Ryan (1–1) | | 40,026 | 31–28 | 5 |
| 60 | June 3 | @ Yankees | 9–3 | Halladay (7–5) | Giese (0–1) | | 53,629 | 32–28 | 4 |
| 61 | June 4 | @ Yankees | 5–1 | Mussina (9–4) | Litsch (7–2) | | 51,151 | 32–29 | 4½ |
| 62 | June 5 | @ Yankees | 9–8 | Farnsworth (1–2) | Ryan (1–2) | | 53,571 | 32–30 | 5½ |
| 63 | June 6 | Orioles | 6–5 | Sarfate (3–1) | Benítez (0–1) | Sherrill (21) | 23,649 | 32–31 | 5½ |
| 64 | June 7 | Orioles | 9–5 | Guthrie (3–6) | Burnett (5–6) | | 25,122 | 32–32 | 6½ |
| 65 | June 8 | Orioles | 5–4 | Halladay (8–5) | Albers (3–2) | Ryan (13) | 25,365 | 33–32 | 6½ |
| 66 | June 9 | Mariners | 3–2 (10) | Dickey (1–1) | Frasor (1–1) | Putz (7) | 20,073 | 33–33 | 7 |
| 67 | June 10 | Mariners | 3–1 | McGowan (5–4) | Silva (3–7) | | 36,170 | 34–33 | 6 |
| 68 | June 11 | Mariners | 2–1 | Hernández (5–5) | Ryan (1–3) | Morrow (1) | 35,702 | 34–34 | 7 |
| 69 | June 13 | Cubs | 3–2 | Burnett (6–6) | Gallagher (3–3) | Ryan (14) | 27,803 | 35–34 | 6½ |
| 70 | June 14 | Cubs | 6–2 | Marquis (5–3) | Halladay (8–6) | | 34,048 | 35–35 | 7½ |
| 71 | June 15 | Cubs | 7–4 | Lilly (7–5) | Litsch (7–3) | | 40,738 | 35–36 | 8½ |
| 72 | June 17 | @ Brewers | 7–0 | Parra (6–2) | McGowan (5–5) | | 37,065 | 35–37 | 9 |
| 73 | June 18 | @ Brewers | 5–4 | Sheets (8–1) | Marcum (5–4) | | 34,442 | 35–38 | 10 |
| 74 | June 19 | @ Brewers | 8–7 | Bush (3–7) | Burnett (6–7) | Torres (10) | 35,173 | 35–39 | 10½ |
| 75 | June 20 | @ Pirates | 1–0 (12) | Yates (3–0) | Carlson (1–1) | | 28,962 | 35–40 | 10½ |
| 76 | June 21 | @ Pirates | 6–3 | Maholm (5–5) | Litsch (7–4) | Capps (17) | 27,014 | 35–41 | 10½ |
| 77 | June 22 | @ Pirates | 8–5 | McGowan (6–5) | Beam (0–1) | Ryan (15) | 22,983 | 36–41 | 10½ |
| 78 | June 24 | Reds | 14–1 | Burnett (7–7) | Arroyo (4–7) | | 28,153 | 37–41 | 10 |
| 79 | June 25 | Reds | 6–5 | Burton (4–1) | Wolfe (0–2) | Cordero (15) | 25,437 | 37–42 | 11 |
| 80 | June 26 | Reds | 7–1 | Litsch (8–4) | Vólquez (10–3) | | 25,129 | 38–42 | 10½ |
| 81 | June 27 | Braves | 4–0 | Jurrjens (8–3) | McGowan (6–6) | | 24,282 | 38–43 | 11½ |
| 82 | June 28 | Braves | 9–5 | Parrish (1–0) | Hudson (8–6) | | 28,518 | 39–43 | 10½ |
| 83 | June 29 | Braves | 1–0 | Burnett (8–7) | Reyes (3–6) | Ryan (16) | 30,514 | 40–43 | 10 |
| 84 | June 30 | @ Mariners | 2–0 | Halladay (9–6) | Dickey (2–4) | | 30,179 | 41–43 | 10 |

July: 13–11 (Home: 8–4; Away: 5–7)

| # | Date | Opponent | Score | Win | Loss | Save | Attendance | Record | GBL |
|---|---|---|---|---|---|---|---|---|---|
| 85 | July 1 | @ Mariners | 7–6 | Morrow (1–1) | Downs (0–2) | | 24,586 | 41–44 | 11 |
| 86 | July 2 | @ Mariners | 4–2 | Washburn (4–7) | McGowan (6–7) | Morrow (5) | 23,283 | 41–45 | 12 |
| 87 | July 4 | @ Angels | 8–2 | Weaver (8–8) | Burnett (8–8) | | 44,021 | 41–46 | 13 |
| 88 | July 5 | @ Angels | 7–5 | Halladay (10–6) | Lackey (6–2) | | 43,767 | 42–46 | 13 |
| 89 | July 6 | @ Angels | 7–1 | Garland (8–5) | Litsch (8–5) | | 41,026 | 42–47 | 14 |
| 90 | July 8 | Orioles | 7–6 | Ryan (2–3) | Johnson (2–3) | | 23,276 | 43–47 | 12½ |
| 91 | July 9 | Orioles | 9–8 | Burnett (9–8) | Olson (6–4) | Ryan (17) | 22,365 | 44–47 | 11½ |
| 92 | July 10 | Orioles | 6–5 | Camp (2–1) | Sherrill (2–4) | | 22,279 | 45–47 | 10½ |
| 93 | July 11 | Yankees | 5–0 | Halladay (11–6) | Chamberlain (2–3) | | 43,078 | 46–47 | 9½ |
| 94 | July 12 | Yankees | 9–4 | Rasner (5–7) | Litsch (8–6) | | 44,363 | 46–48 | 9½ |
| 95 | July 13 | Yankees | 4–1 | Burnett (10–8) | Pettitte (10–7) | Ryan (18) | 43,854 | 47–48 | 9 |
| 96 | July 18 | @ Rays | 2–1 | Shields (8–6) | Burnett (10–9) | Balfour (4) | 23,706 | 47–49 | 9½ |
| 97 | July 19 | @ Rays | 6–4 | Garza (8–5) | Halladay (11–7) | Wheeler (4) | 32,669 | 47–50 | 10½ |
| 98 | July 20 | @ Rays | 9–4 | Camp (3–1) | Jackson (5–7) | | 21,037 | 48–50 | 9½ |
| 99 | July 21 | @ Orioles | 8–3 | Liz (4–2) | Litsch (8–7) | | 12,772 | 48–51 | 10½ |
| 100 | July 22 | @ Orioles | 10–8 | Carlson (2–1) | Cabrera (0–1) | Ryan (19) | 15,184 | 49–51 | 9½ |
| 101 | July 23 | @ Orioles | 5–1 ‡ | Burnett (11–9) | Guthrie (6–8) | | 24,776 | 50–51 | – |
| 102 | July 24 | @ Orioles | 7–1 | Halladay (12–7) | Cabrera (6–6) | | 23,329 | 51–51 | 8½ |
| 103 | July 25 | Mariners | 5–4 (10) | Carlson (3–1) | Lowe (1–4) | | 28,463 | 52–51 | 8½ |
| 104 | July 26 | Mariners | 8–3 | Purcey (1–1) | Dickey (2–6) | | 33,041 | 53–51 | 8½ |
| 105 | July 27 | Mariners | 5–1 | Washburn (5–9) | Marcum (5–5) | | 33,369 | 53–52 | 8½ |
| 106 | July 28 | Rays | 3–1 | Burnett (12–9) | Shields (9–7) | Ryan (20) | 23,476 | 54–52 | 7½ |
| 107 | July 29 | Rays | 3–0 | Garza (9–6) | Halladay (12–8) | | 26,791 | 54–53 | 8½ |
| 108 | July 30 | Rays | 3–2 | Jackson (7–7) | Richmond (0–1) | Percival (23) | 40,322 | 54–54 | 9½ |

August: 16–12 (Home: 7–6; Away: 9–6)

| # | Date | Opponent | Score | Win | Loss | Save | Attendance | Record | GBL |
|---|---|---|---|---|---|---|---|---|---|
| 109 | August 1 | @ Rangers | 9–8 | Wilson (2–2) | Ryan (2–4) | | 23,973 | 54–55 | 10½ |
| 110 | August 2 | @ Rangers | 6–4 | Burnett (13–9) | Feldman (4–4) | Ryan (21) | 32,641 | 55–55 | 10½ |
| 111 | August 3 | @ Rangers | 8–4 | Mendoza (3–4) | Purcey (1–2) | | 17,488 | 55–56 | 11½ |
| 112 | August 4 | Athletics | 6–1 | Halladay (13–8) | Gallagher (4–5) | | 24,761 | 56–56 | 10½ |
| 113 | August 5 | Athletics | 4–3 | Carlson (4–1) | Street (2–5) | | 23,580 | 57–56 | 10½ |
| 114 | August 6 | Athletics | 5–1 | Marcum (6–5) | Gonzalez (0–1) | | 29,256 | 58–56 | 10½ |
| 115 | August 7 | Athletics | 6–4 | Burnett (14–9) | Blevins (1–2) | Ryan (22) | 28,821 | 59–56 | 9½ |
| 116 | August 8 | Indians | 5–2 | Reyes (3–1) | Purcey (1–3) | Lewis (1) | 31,627 | 59–57 | 10½ |
| 117 | August 9 | Indians | 4–2 | Byrd (6–10) | Halladay (13–9) | | 39,623 | 59–58 | 11½ |
| 118 | August 10 | Indians | 4–0 | Lee (16–2) | Richmond (0–2) | | 36,447 | 59–59 | 12½ |
| 119 | August 11 | @ Tigers | 7–2 | Marcum (7–5) | Verlander (8–13) | | 39,718 | 60–59 | 12 |
| 120 | August 12 | @ Tigers | 6–4 | Burnett (15–9) | Zumaya (0–2) | Ryan (23) | 39,790 | 61–59 | 11 |
| 121 | August 13 | @ Tigers | 4–3 | Purcey (2–3) | Rogers (8–10) | League (1) | 39,073 | 62–59 | 11 |
| 122 | August 14 | @ Tigers | 5–1 | Galarraga (11–4) | Frasor (1–2) | | 41,259 | 62–60 | 12 |
| – | August 15 | @ Red Sox | Postponed (rain) Rescheduled for September 13 | | | | | | |
| 123 | August 16 | @ Red Sox | 4–1 | Halladay (14–9) | Byrd (7–11) | | 37,834 | 63–60 | 11½ |
| 124 | August 17 | @ Red Sox | 15–4 | Marcum (8–5) | Beckett (11–9) | | 37,415 | 64–60 | 11½ |
| 125 | August 19 | Yankees | 2–1 | Burnett (16–9) | Veras (3–2) | Ryan (24) | 37,221 | 65–60 | 12 |
| 126 | August 20 | Yankees | 5–1 | Pettitte (13–9) | Purcey (2–4) | | 34,910 | 65–61 | 12 |
| 127 | August 21 | Yankees | 14–3 | Halladay (15–9) | Ponson (7–4) | | 37,037 | 66–61 | 11½ |
| 128 | August 22 | Red Sox | 8–4 | Byrd (8–11) | Marcum (8–6) | | 40,181 | 66–62 | 12½ |
| 129 | August 23 | Red Sox | 11–0 | Litsch (9–7) | Lester (12–9) | | 44,896 | 67–62 | 12½ |
| 130 | August 24 | Red Sox | 6–5 | Papelbon (5–3) | League (0–2) | Delcarmen (1) | 44,521 | 67–63 | 12½ |
| 131 | August 26 | @ Rays | 6–2 | Halladay (16–9) | Shields (11–7) | | 13,478 | 68–63 | 11½ |
| 132 | August 27 | @ Rays | 1–0 | Garza (11–9) | Purcey (2–5) | Wheeler (9) | 12,678 | 68–64 | 12½ |
| 133 | August 28 | @ Rays | 3–2 | Jackson (11–8) | Listch (9–8) | Wheeler (10) | 14,039 | 68–65 | 13½ |
| 134 | August 29 | @ Yankees | 2–1 | Pavano (2–0) | Burnett (16–10) | Rivera (32) | 53,088 | 68–66 | 14½ |
| 135 | August 30 | @ Yankees | 7–6 | League (1–2) | Marte (4–3) | Ryan (25) | 53,273 | 69–66 | 14½ |
| 136 | August 31 | @ Yankees | 6–2 | Halladay (17–9) | Pettitte (13–11) | | 53,634 | 70–66 | 14½ |

September: 16–10 (Home: 10–5; Away: 6–5)

| # | Date | Opponent | Score | Win | Loss | Save | Attendance | Record | GBL |
|---|---|---|---|---|---|---|---|---|---|
| 137 | September 2 | Twins | 7–5 | Carlson (5–1) | Bonser (3–7) | Ryan (26) | 21,254 | 71–66 | 13½ |
| 138 | September 3 | Twins | 5–4 (11) | Carlson (6–1) | Guardado (3–4) | | 21,475 | 72–66 | 12½ |
| 139 | September 4 | Twins | 9–0 | Litsch (10–8) | Slowey (11–9) | | 25,128 | 73–66 | 12½ |
| 140 | September 5 | Rays | 6–4 | Halladay (18–9) | Sonnanstine (13–7) | Ryan (27) | 32,477 | 74–66 | 11½ |
| 141 | September 6 | Rays | 7–4 (13) | Tallet (1–1) | Percival (2–1) | | 34,649 | 75–66 | 10½ |
| 142 | September 7 | Rays | 1–0 | Purcey (3–5) | Garza (11–9) | Carlson (2) | 39,854 | 76–66 | 9½ |
| – | September 8 | @ White Sox | Postponed (rain) Rescheduled for September 9 | | | | | | |
| 143 | September 9 | @ White Sox | 3–1 | Burnett (17–10) | Vázquez (11–13) | Ryan (28) | 24,621 | 77–66 | 8½ |
| 144 | September 9 | @ White Sox | 8–2 | Litsch (11–8) | Richard (2–4) | | 28,505 | 78–66 | 8½ |
| 145 | September 10 | @ White Sox | 6–5 | Buehrle (13–11) | Halladay (18–10) | | 26,198 | 78–67 | 9½ |
| 146 | September 11 | @ White Sox | 6–4 | Marcum (9–6) | Floyd (15–7) | Ryan (29) | 27,170 | 79–67 | 9 |
| 147 | September 12 | @ Red Sox | 7–0 | Wakefield (9–10) | Purcey (3–6) | | 37,398 | 79–68 | 9½ |
| 148 | September 13 | @ Red Sox | 8–1 | Burnett (18–10) | Byrd (11–12) | | 37,341 | 80–68 | 9½ |
| 149 | September 13 | @ Red Sox | 7–5 | Masterson (6–4) | Downs (0–3) | Papelbon (37) | 37,846 | 80–69 | 9½ |
| 150 | September 14 | @ Red Sox | 4–3 | Lester (15–5) | Halladay (18–11) | Papelbon (38) | 37,007 | 80–70 | 9½ |
| 151 | September 16 | Orioles | 2–0 | Waters (3–3) | Marcum (9–7) | | 25,746 | 80–71 | 10 |
| 152 | September 17 | Orioles | 8–7 | Carlson (7–1) | Mickolio (0–1) | Ryan (30) | 24,546 | 81–71 | 10 |
| 153 | September 18 | Orioles | 3–2 | Litsch (12–8) | Olson (9–9) | Ryan (31) | 29,063 | 82–71 | 9 |
| 154 | September 19 | Red Sox | 4–3 | Delcarmen (1–2) | Tallet (1–2) | Papelbon (39) | 34,982 | 82–72 | 10 |
| 155 | September 20 | Red Sox | 6–3 | Halladay (19–11) | Lester (15–6) | Ryan (32) | 40,554 | 83–72 | 10 |
| 156 | September 21 | Red Sox | 3–0 | Matsuzaka (18–2) | Richmond (0–3) | Papelbon (40) | 38,814 | 83–73 | 10 |
| 157 | September 23 | Yankees | 3–1 | Mussina (19–9) | Litsch (12–9) | Rivera (38) | 27,216 | 83–74 | 12 |
| 158 | September 24 | Yankees | 6–2 (10) | Veras (5–2) | Carlson (7–2) | | 28,701 | 83–75 | 13 |
| 159 | September 25 | Yankees | 8–2 | Halladay (20–11) | Pavano (4–2) | | 44,346 | 84–75 | 12 |
| 160 | September 26 | @ Orioles | 3–0 (7) | Richmond (1–3) | Waters (3–5) | | 17,716 | 85–75 | 11 |
| 161 | September 27 | @ Orioles | 2–1 (6) | Bass (4–4) | Parrish (1–1) | | 18,378 | 85–76 | 11 |
| 162 | September 28 | @ Orioles | 10–1 | Litsch (13–9) | Guthrie (10–12) | | 19,554 | 86–76 | 11 |

- † At The Ballpark at Disney's Wide World of Sports in Lake Buena Vista, Florida.
- ‡ Game suspended due to rain in the top of the 6th inning. Completed on July 24.

== Player stats ==
=== Batting ===
Note: G = Games played; AB = At Bats; R = Runs scored; H = Hits; 2B = Doubles; 3B = Triples; HR = Home runs; RBI = Runs batted in; AVG = Batting average; SB = Stolen bases

| Player | G | AB | R | H | 2B | 3B | HR | RBI | AVG | SB |
|---|---|---|---|---|---|---|---|---|---|---|
| Lyle Overbay | 158 | 544 | 74 | 147 | 32 | 2 | 15 | 69 | .270 | 1 |
| Alex Ríos | 155 | 635 | 91 | 185 | 47 | 8 | 15 | 79 | .291 | 32 |
| Marco Scutaro | 145 | 517 | 76 | 138 | 23 | 1 | 7 | 60 | .267 | 7 |
| Scott Rolen | 115 | 408 | 58 | 107 | 30 | 3 | 11 | 50 | .262 | 5 |
| Joe Inglett | 109 | 344 | 45 | 102 | 15 | 7 | 3 | 39 | .297 | 9 |
| Vernon Wells | 108 | 427 | 63 | 128 | 22 | 1 | 20 | 78 | .300 | 4 |
| Matt Stairs | 105 | 320 | 42 | 80 | 11 | 1 | 11 | 44 | .250 | 1 |
| Rod Barajas | 104 | 349 | 44 | 87 | 23 | 0 | 11 | 49 | .249 | 0 |
| Adam Lind | 88 | 326 | 48 | 92 | 16 | 4 | 9 | 40 | .282 | 2 |
| Gregg Zaun | 86 | 245 | 29 | 58 | 12 | 0 | 6 | 30 | .237 | 2 |
| Brad Wilkerson | 85 | 208 | 20 | 45 | 8 | 2 | 4 | 23 | .216 | 2 |
| John McDonald | 84 | 186 | 21 | 39 | 8 | 0 | 1 | 18 | .210 | 3 |
| David Eckstein | 76 | 260 | 27 | 72 | 18 | 0 | 1 | 23 | .277 | 2 |
| Aaron Hill | 55 | 205 | 19 | 54 | 14 | 0 | 2 | 20 | .263 | 4 |
| Shannon Stewart | 52 | 175 | 14 | 42 | 4 | 2 | 1 | 14 | .240 | 3 |
| Kevin Mench | 51 | 115 | 18 | 28 | 11 | 1 | 0 | 10 | .243 | 2 |
| Travis Snider | 24 | 73 | 9 | 22 | 6 | 0 | 2 | 13 | .301 | 0 |
| José Bautista | 21 | 56 | 7 | 12 | 2 | 0 | 3 | 10 | .214 | 0 |
| Frank Thomas | 16 | 60 | 7 | 10 | 1 | 0 | 3 | 11 | .167 | 0 |
| Curtis Thigpen | 10 | 17 | 2 | 3 | 0 | 0 | 1 | 1 | .176 | 0 |
| Buck Coats | 8 | 5 | 0 | 1 | 0 | 0 | 0 | 0 | .200 | 1 |
| Jason Frasor | 5 | 0 | 0 | 0 | 0 | 0 | 0 | 0 | .000 | 0 |
| B. J. Ryan | 5 | 0 | 0 | 0 | 0 | 0 | 0 | 0 | .000 | 0 |
| Jesse Carlson | 4 | 0 | 0 | 0 | 0 | 0 | 0 | 0 | .000 | 0 |
| Scott Downs | 4 | 0 | 0 | 0 | 0 | 0 | 0 | 0 | .000 | 0 |
| Jorge Velandia | 3 | 7 | 0 | 0 | 0 | 0 | 0 | 0 | .000 | 0 |
| Shawn Camp | 3 | 0 | 0 | 0 | 0 | 0 | 0 | 0 | .000 | 0 |
| Brian Tallet | 3 | 0 | 0 | 0 | 0 | 0 | 0 | 0 | .000 | 0 |
| Jesse Litsch | 2 | 3 | 0 | 0 | 0 | 0 | 0 | 0 | .000 | 0 |
| Brian Wolfe | 2 | 0 | 0 | 0 | 0 | 0 | 0 | 0 | .000 | 0 |
| Héctor Luna | 2 | 1 | 0 | 1 | 0 | 0 | 0 | 0 | 1.000 | 0 |
| A. J. Burnett | 2 | 3 | 0 | 0 | 0 | 0 | 0 | 0 | .000 | 0 |
| Shaun Marcum | 2 | 2 | 0 | 0 | 0 | 0 | 0 | 0 | .000 | 0 |
| Roy Halladay | 2 | 4 | 0 | 0 | 0 | 0 | 0 | 0 | .000 | 0 |
| Dustin McGowan | 2 | 3 | 0 | 0 | 0 | 0 | 0 | 0 | .000 | 0 |
| Robinzon Diaz | 1 | 4 | 0 | 0 | 0 | 0 | 0 | 0 | .000 | 0 |
| David Purcey | 1 | 1 | 0 | 0 | 0 | 0 | 0 | 0 | .000 | 0 |
| Armando Benitez | 1 | 0 | 0 | 0 | 0 | 0 | 0 | 0 | .000 | 0 |
| Team totals | 162 | 5503 | 714 | 1453 | 303 | 32 | 126 | 681 | .264 | 80 |

=== Pitching ===
Note: W = Wins; L = Losses; ERA = Earned run average; G = Games pitched; GS = Games started; SV = Saves; IP = Innings pitched; R = Runs allowed; ER = Earned runs allowed; BB = Walks allowed; K = Strikeouts

| Player | W | L | ERA | G | GS | SV | IP | R | ER | BB | K |
|---|---|---|---|---|---|---|---|---|---|---|---|
| Roy Halladay | 20 | 11 | 2.78 | 34 | 33 | 0 | 246.0 | 88 | 76 | 39 | 206 |
| A. J. Burnett | 18 | 10 | 4.07 | 35 | 34 | 0 | 221.1 | 109 | 100 | 86 | 231 |
| Jesse Litsch | 13 | 9 | 3.58 | 29 | 28 | 0 | 176.0 | 79 | 70 | 39 | 99 |
| Shaun Marcum | 9 | 7 | 3.39 | 25 | 25 | 0 | 151.1 | 60 | 57 | 50 | 123 |
| Jesse Carlson | 7 | 2 | 2.25 | 69 | 0 | 2 | 60.0 | 16 | 15 | 21 | 55 |
| Dustin McGowan | 6 | 7 | 4.37 | 19 | 19 | 0 | 111.1 | 60 | 54 | 38 | 85 |
| Shawn Camp | 3 | 1 | 4.12 | 40 | 0 | 0 | 39.1 | 18 | 18 | 11 | 31 |
| David Purcey | 3 | 6 | 5.54 | 12 | 12 | 0 | 65.0 | 41 | 40 | 29 | 58 |
| B. J. Ryan | 2 | 4 | 2.95 | 60 | 0 | 32 | 58.0 | 21 | 19 | 28 | 58 |
| Scott Richmond | 1 | 3 | 4.00 | 5 | 5 | 0 | 27.0 | 12 | 12 | 2 | 20 |
| Jason Frasor | 1 | 2 | 4.18 | 49 | 0 | 0 | 47.1 | 23 | 22 | 32 | 42 |
| John Parrish | 1 | 1 | 4.04 | 13 | 6 | 0 | 42.1 | 19 | 19 | 15 | 21 |
| Brandon League | 1 | 2 | 2.18 | 31 | 0 | 1 | 33.0 | 9 | 8 | 15 | 23 |
| Brian Tallet | 1 | 2 | 2.88 | 51 | 0 | 0 | 56.1 | 19 | 18 | 22 | 47 |
| Scott Downs | 0 | 3 | 1.78 | 66 | 0 | 5 | 70.2 | 15 | 14 | 27 | 57 |
| Brian Wolfe | 0 | 2 | 2.45 | 20 | 0 | 0 | 22.0 | 6 | 6 | 6 | 14 |
| Armando Benitez | 0 | 1 | 5.68 | 8 | 0 | 0 | 6.1 | 5 | 4 | 2 | 9 |
| Jeremy Accardo | 0 | 3 | 6.57 | 16 | 0 | 4 | 12.1 | 10 | 9 | 4 | 5 |
| Randy Wells | 0 | 0 | 0.00 | 1 | 0 | 0 | 1.0 | 0 | 0 | 1 | 0 |
| Team totals | 86 | 76 | 3.49 | 162 | 162 | 44 | 1446.2 | 610 | 561 | 467 | 1184 |

== Farm system ==
| Level | Team | League | Manager |
|---|---|---|---|
| AAA | Syracuse Chiefs | International League | Doug Davis |
| AA | New Hampshire Fisher Cats | Eastern League | Gary Cathcart |
| A | Dunedin Blue Jays | Florida State League | Omar Malavé |
| A | Lansing Lugnuts | Midwest League | Clayton McCullough |
| A-Short Season | Auburn Doubledays | New York–Penn League | Dennis Holmberg |
| Rookie | GCL Blue Jays | Gulf Coast League | Dave Pano |
