= 2008 New York Yankees season =

Season for the Major League Baseball team the New York Yankees

2008 New York Yankees
- League: American League
- Division: East
- Ballpark: Yankee Stadium
- City: New York
- Record: 89–73 (.549)
- Divisional place: 3rd
- Owners: George Steinbrenner
- General managers: Brian Cashman
- Managers: Joe Girardi
- Television: YES Network; WWOR-TV (My 9)
- Radio: WCBS (AM); WQBU-FM (Spanish)

The 2008 New York Yankees season was the 106th season for the New York Yankees franchise. The Yankees hosted the 2008 All-Star Game at Yankee Stadium on Tuesday July 15, 2008. It was the 83rd and last season at the original Yankee Stadium prior to the team's move to a new ballpark (also called "Yankee Stadium") just north of the current stadium. The Yankees also hosted the All-Star Game on July 15. It also marked the first season since 1993 that the Yankees failed to make it to the playoffs (excepting the 1994 season, when a players' strike canceled the postseason, though the Yankees had the best record in the American League that year). Also, it would also be the first under a new team skipper, former team catcher Joe Girardi, who assumed the managerial role in the offseason. The next active playoff streak belonged to the NHL's Detroit Red Wings who made the playoffs every year since 1991 until it was broken in 2017.

== Offseason ==
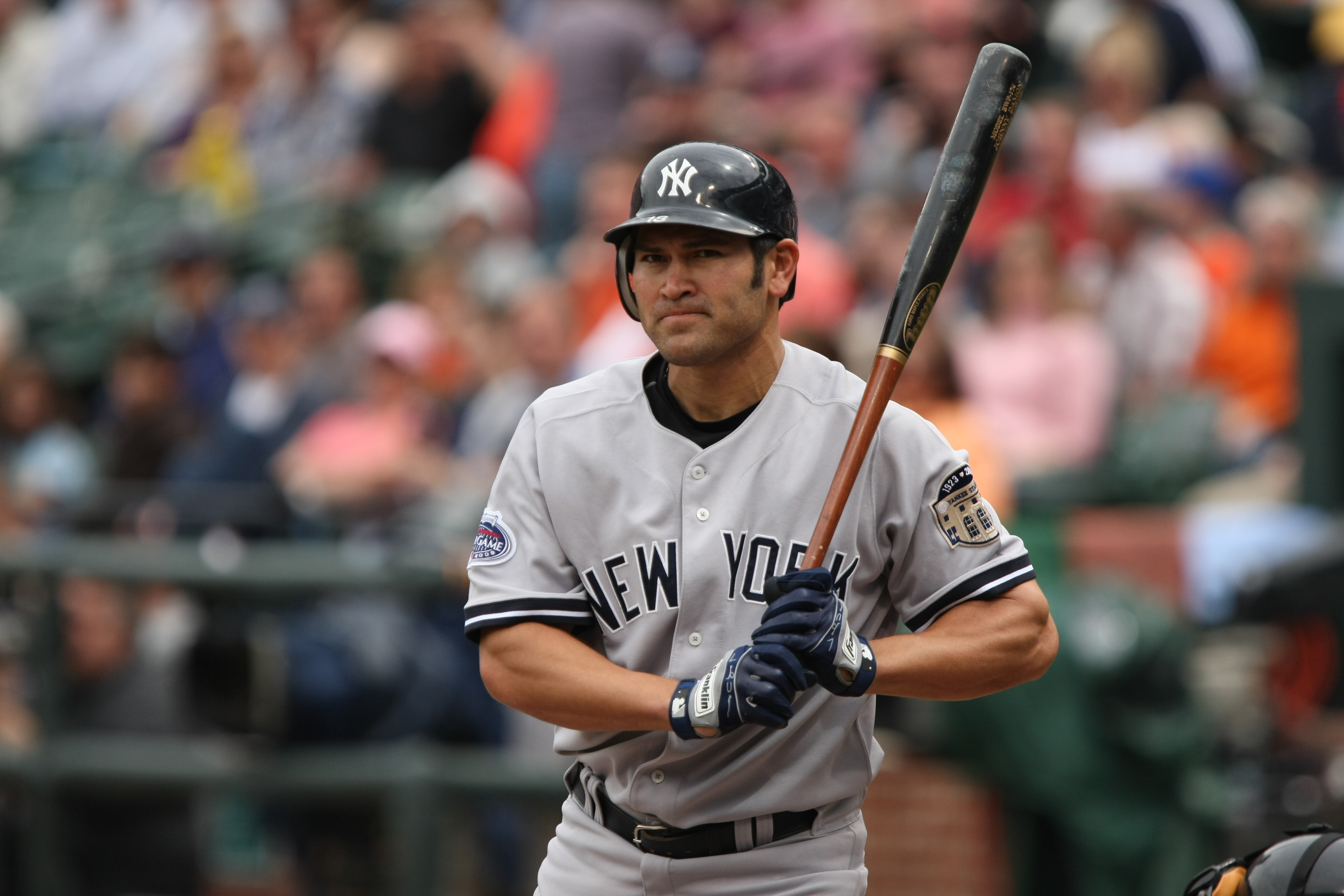
Johnny Damon batting in 2008.

The Yankees' 2007/2008 offseason began in a tumultuous manner, with uncertainty as to the status of manager Joe Torre and team stalwarts Andy Pettitte, Jorge Posada, Mariano Rivera, and Alex Rodriguez, all of whom were free agents. While Torre departed after 12 years as the team's manager for the Los Angeles Dodgers, all four free agents returned to play for the Yankees in 2008, providing stability and continuity for new manager Joe Girardi.

=== Roster changes ===
Manager Joe Torre left for the Los Angeles Dodgers after the 2007 season. After conducting interviews with Don Mattingly, Tony Peña and Joe Girardi, Girardi was signed to be the new Yankees Manager. This prompted Mattingly to leave the team as well and follow Torre to the Dodgers.

On November 29, the Yankees re-signed catcher Jorge Posada to a four-year contract for $52,400,000. The $13,100,000 per season was at the time the highest average salary ever for a catcher.

On December 3, the Yankees re-signed backup catcher José Molina to a 2-year, $4 million contract.

On December 4, the Yankees shipped minor league pitcher and part-time MLB starter Tyler Clippard to the Washington Nationals for reliever Jonathan Albaladejo.

On December 9, the Yankees agreed to a contract with relief pitcher LaTroy Hawkins for 1 year, $3.75 million.

On December 12, the Yankees re-signed pitcher Andy Pettitte to a 1-year, $16 million contract.

Alex Rodriguez opted out of his contract in the middle of Game 4 of the 2007 World Series. The Yankees initially stated that they would not negotiate with Rodriguez once he opted out but changed course once Rodriguez announced his desire to return to pinstripes after issuing an apology for the public and the Yankees misunderstanding his desire to stay with the team. On December 13, 2007, Rodriguez and the Yankees officially agreed to a 10-year, $275 million contract that would rise to above $300 million if certain performance milestones were reached.

On December 17, the Yankees re-signed closer Mariano Rivera. Despite his original plan to hold out for a fourth year, Rivera agreed to a three-year contract offer worth $45 million, making him the highest-paid closer in baseball history.

Relief pitcher Luis Vizcaíno turned down an offer of salary arbitration and signed a multi-year deal with the Colorado Rockies on December 21. 1B Andy Phillips departed for the Cincinnati Reds, and Doug Mientkiewicz departed for the Pittsburgh Pirates. Roger Clemens remained a free agent and did not return to the Yankees in 2008. That would be the end of Clemens' MLB career. On March 10, 2008, the team signed actor/comedian Billy Crystal to a one-day contract just before his 60th birthday.

== Regular season ==
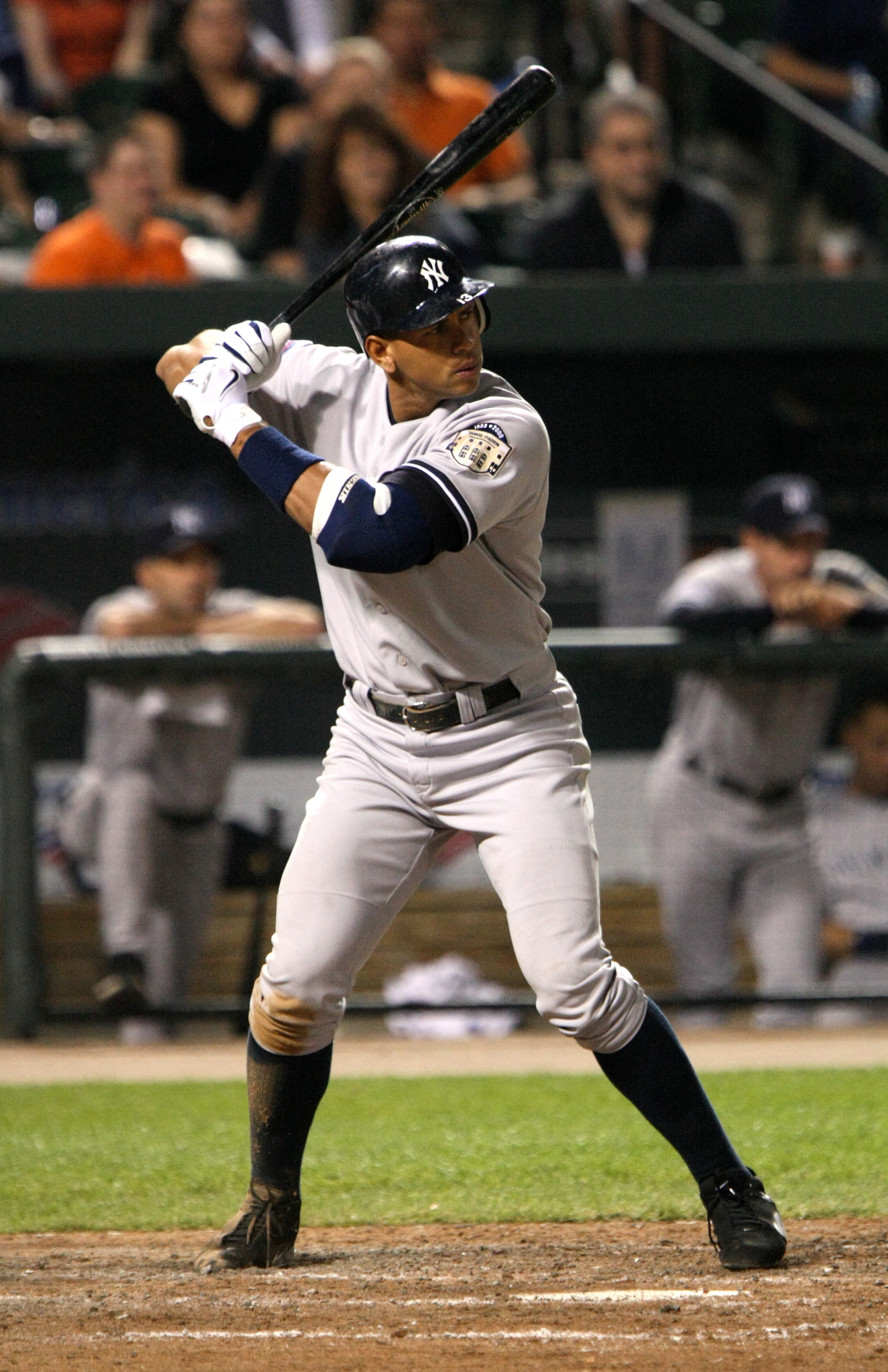
Yankees' third baseman Alex Rodriguez batting in 2008

=== April ===
The Yankees started opening day one day late at Yankee Stadium against the Toronto Blue Jays after a rainout. The Yankees took 2 of 3 games in the series. After that, they faced a new look Rays team. They lost the first two by the scores of 13-4 and 6–3, but would rebound and split the series 2 games apiece. Following the series, the Yankees had a grueling road trip in which they played 18 of their next 20 games on the road. During this stretch, rookies Phil Hughes and Ian Kennedy struggled mightily and went winless the entire first month. After a rib injury to Hughes, Kennedy was reassigned to the minor league AAA affiliate Scranton/Wilkes-Barre as the Yankees called up Darrell Rasner. Fortunately, Rasner went 3–1 with a 1.80 ERA in his first four starts.

Both shortstop Derek Jeter and third baseman Alex Rodriguez had suffered minor quadriceps injuries at different times. Catcher Jorge Posada was also placed on the disabled list for the first time in his career after a slight tear in his rotator cuff and backup infielder Wilson Betemit missed several games due to conjunctivitis.

=== May ===
Their struggles continued in May, as they only had one series win through the 20th and that was a 3-game sweep against the Mariners on May 2–4 at the Stadium. They would lose 3 of 4 against the Rays in St. Petersburg and were swept in 2 games by the Mets in the Subway Series. In that series, there was a controversial call where Carlos Delgado appeared to hit a foul ball by the left field foul pole, when a replay would later show that the ball was actually a home run. The Mets would go on to win 11–2. The game on the 16th was postponed because of rain. The Yankees would end the month winning 8 of their last 10 games, escaping the AL East cellar and getting back to over .500.

=== June ===
The Yankees lost three in a row through the first three days of June, dropping the final 2 games of the four-game set against the Twins at the Hubert H. Humphrey Metrodome, then were blitzed 9–3 by the Jays on Joba Chamberlain's first career start in the majors. The Yankees, however, won the next 2 against them including a wild comeback on June 5 that ended in a two-run, pinch hit homer into the upper deck by Jason Giambi after trailing 7–2 in the 6th inning. Following the series, Yankees split a 4-game weekend series with the Royals and took 2 out of 3 from the A's highlighted by Hideki Matsui celebrating his 34th birthday with a Grand Slam off of Joe Blanton. The Yankees would then sweep the Astros and were 4 games over .500 for the first time this season, but Chien-Ming Wang hurt his leg rounding the bases in a 13–0 win. He was out for the rest of the season. The Yankees would then sweep the Padres at home to win 7 straight for the first time this season. The streak came to a halt on June 20, when they lost to Edinson Vólquez and the Reds 4–2 on the Reds' first visit to Yankee Stadium since 1976, the first season of the renovated Yankee Stadium. They would follow with a lopsided 6–0 loss in which they left 12 runners on base despite Dan Giese's great outing, but salvage the final game with a 4–1 win. The Yankees traveled to PNC Park for the first time ever when they faced the Pirates from June 24–25 before returning to New York to play a double header with their cross-town rival Mets. In game one, the Yankees were outmatched 15–6, but rebounded in the nightcap game two, with a 9–0 shutout.

=== July ===
After dropping the first 2 games of a 3-game series to the Texas Rangers, the Yankees salvaged the final game 18–7 before losing the first two of a four-game series to the Red Sox 7-0 and 6–4. With Mike Mussina on the hill for game 3, they would rebound behind his 6 shutout innings to barely win 2-1 and then earn a split when rookie Brett Gardner hit a game-winning single in the bottom of the 10th inning for a 5–4 victory. In an important 2-game series against the Rays, they would win the first game 5–0 behind Andy Pettitte's stellar pitching performance and then complete the sweep on Bobby Abreu's game-winning double. The Yankees would go to Pittsburgh to play a make-up interleague game against the Pirates and lose 4–2. Next, they traveled to Toronto to play three against the Blue Jays. They would be shut out by Roy Halladay in the opener, getting only two hits but then they rebounded and won their next game 9–4 behind home runs by Derek Jeter and Alex Rodriguez. It was their 50th win of the season. After the game, the Yankees learned that former broadcaster Bobby Murcer died of cancer. After losing 4–1 to the Blue Jays on Sunday, the Yankees head into the All-Star break 6 games behind the Red Sox in the AL East and 5½ games behind the Rays in the Wild Card race. After the break, Yankees won 8 in a row including back to back sweeps of the Twins and A's, extending their winning streak to 10 games at home. After defeating the Boston Red Sox 1–0 in Joba Chamberlain's first career start at Fenway Park, the Yankees acquired Pittsburgh Pirates corner outfielder Xavier Nady and left-handed reliever Dámaso Marte for four minor league prospects. The Yankees then traded Kyle Farnsworth to the Detroit Tigers for catcher Iván Rodríguez.

=== August ===
The Yankees started August by losing 1–0 to the Angels when Mariano Rivera gave up a run in the 9th inning. The Yankees rebounded to take the next two, including an 8–2 win on Old Timers Day and a 14-9 come-from-behind victory on Sunday. The Yankees embarked on a key 10-game road trip with four against the Texas Rangers. In the opener, Joba Chamberlain was injured before the bullpen surrendered a walk-off grand slam to Marlon Byrd. The second game saw the Yankees fall short despite a grand slam of their own before rebounding to win the next two for the split. They were then swept in Anaheim, highlighted by an 8th inning 8-run meltdown on Saturday and Mariano Rivera allowing a walk off hit the next day. After losing two out of three to the Minnesota Twins, the Yankees were written off as contenders. Returning home, they dropped the opener to the Kansas City Royals but rebounded to win the next day in the 12th inning when Brett Gardner drove in the winning run. They took the series with a 15-6 romp the next day. The Yankees went back on the road for six games and lost two of three in Toronto. They did rebound to sweep the Baltimore Orioles, but the struggles continued at home vs Boston as they dropped the first 2 games, 7–3, and 11–3, respectively. A-Rod was heavily booed in game 1, as he was 0 for 5 and grounded into 2 double plays with one being in a bases-loaded situation. He also struck out to end the game. The Yankees would salvage the series finale with a score of 3-2 thanks to pinch-hitter Jason Giambi hitting a two-run homer in the 7th, and then a walk-off single in the bottom of the 9th.

=== September ===
The Yanks started off the last month of the regular season on a good note by beating the Tigers 13–9 in a makeup game that was postponed earlier in the season. They continued to keep fans' hopes high by thrashing the AL East leading Rays 7-2 and 8–4 in the first two games of a 3-game series in Tampa. They dropped the third game of the series 7–5. The following day in Seattle, Wilson Betemit's eighth-inning RBI double ended Brandon Morrow's no-hit bid, but New York still lost the game 3–1.

The final regular season game at Yankee Stadium was played on September 21, 2008, against the Baltimore Orioles, who are based in the city from which both the Yankees and their great star Babe Ruth originated. Fielding Derek Jeter as their captain, Andy Pettitte as the starting pitcher, and led by home runs from Johnny Damon and José Molina, the Yankees won 7–3. Molina's home run, a two-run shot hit to left-center field with one out in the bottom of the 4th inning, turned out to be the final home run in Stadium history. The final run was scored by Yankee pinch-runner Brett Gardner in the bottom of the 7th inning. Mariano Rivera pitched the top of the 9th inning, and the final batter was Baltimore's Brian Roberts, who hit a ground-ball out to Yankee first baseman Cody Ransom, closing out 83 years of baseball history. After the game, Derek Jeter addressed the crowd, thanking them for their support over the years, and urging them to "take the memories of this field, add them to the new memories that will come at the new Yankee Stadium and continue to pass them on from generation to generation." The Yankees players then circled the field and saluted the fans, to the sound of "New York, New York". Guest commentators for the game on ESPN included Yankee legends Reggie Jackson, Whitey Ford and Yogi Berra, as well as local YES Network announcer Michael Kay.

==== Line score from final game at Yankee Stadium ====
Team	1	2	3	4	5	6	7	8	9	R	H	E
Baltimore	0	1	1	1	0	0	0	0	0	3	7	1
New York	0	0	3	2	0	0	2	0	X	7	9	1
WP: Andy Pettitte (14–14) LP: Chris Waters (3–4); Home runs: BAL: None; NYY: Johnny Damon (16), José Molina (3)

The Yankees were officially eliminated from the playoffs on September 23 with a Red Sox win over the Indians, making them the last team to miss out in the Division Series era and it was the first time since 1993 they missed the postseason (in 1994, the Yankees had the best record in the American League, but the season came to an early halt as a result of the longest work stoppage in sports history up to that point.)

On September 28, Mike Mussina won 20 games for the first time in his career, the oldest pitcher in major league history to win 20 games for the first time in his career. The record was previously held by Jamie Moyer, as he won 20 as a 38-year-old. This capped a remarkable comeback season for Mussina, who came back to win 20 games after a 5.15 ERA in 2007. He was one of the few bright spots of the Yankees 2008 season.

=== Season standings ===
AL East
Team	W	L	Pct.	GB	Home	Road
Tampa Bay Rays	97	65	.599	—	57‍–‍24	40‍–‍41
Boston Red Sox	95	67	.586	2	56‍–‍25	39‍–‍42
New York Yankees	89	73	.549	8	48‍–‍33	41‍–‍40
Toronto Blue Jays	86	76	.531	11	47‍–‍34	39‍–‍42
Baltimore Orioles	68	93	.422	28½	37‍–‍43	31‍–‍50

=== Record vs. opponents ===
2008 American League record Source: MLB Standings Grid – 2008
Team	BAL	BOS	CWS	CLE	DET	KC	LAA	MIN	NYY	OAK	SEA	TB	TEX	TOR	NL
Baltimore	–	6–12	4–5	4–4	4–3	5–3	3–6	3–3	7–11	0–5	8–2	3–15	4–5	6–12	11–7
Boston	12–6	–	4–3	5–1	5–2	6–1	1–8	4–3	9–9	6–4	6–3	8–10	9–1	9–9	11–7
Chicago	5–4	3–4	–	11–7	12–6	12–6	5–5	9–10	2–5	5–4	5–1	4–6	3–3	1–7	12–6
Cleveland	4–4	1–5	7–11	–	11–7	10–8	4–5	8–10	4–3	5–4	4–5	5–2	6–4	6–1	6–12
Detroit	3–4	2–5	6–12	7–11	–	7–11	3–6	7–11	4–2	3–6	7–3	3–4	6–3	3–5	13–5
Kansas City	3–5	1–6	6–12	8–10	11–7	–	2–3	6–12	5–5	6–3	7–2	3–5	2–7	2–5	13–5
Los Angeles	6–3	8–1	5–5	5–4	6–3	3–2	–	5–3	7–3	10–9	14–5	3–6	12–7	6–3	10–8
Minnesota	3–3	3–4	10–9	10–8	11–7	12–6	3–5	–	4–6	5–5	5–4	3–3	5–5	0–6	14–4
New York	11–7	9–9	5–2	3–4	2–4	5–5	3–7	6–4	–	5–1	7–2	11–7	3–4	9–9	10–8
Oakland	5–0	4–6	4–5	4–5	6–3	3–6	9–10	5–5	1–5	-	10–9	3–6	7–12	4–6	10–8
Seattle	2–8	3–6	1–5	5–4	3–7	2–7	5–14	4–5	2–7	9–10	–	3–4	8–11	5–4	9–9
Tampa Bay	15–3	10–8	6–4	2–5	4–3	5–3	6–3	3–3	7–11	6–3	4–3	–	6–3	11–7	12–6
Texas	5–4	1–9	3–3	4–6	3–6	7–2	7–12	5–5	4–3	12–7	11–8	3–6	–	4–4	10–8
Toronto	12–6	9–9	7–1	1–6	5–3	5–2	3–6	6–0	9–9	6–4	4–5	7–11	4–4	–	8–10

=== Roster ===
2008 New York Yankees
Roster
Pitchers: 91 Alfredo Aceves; 63 Jonathan Albaladejo; 47,39 Chris Britton; 33 Brian Bruney; 62 Joba Chamberlain; 48 Phil Coke; 48 Kyle Farnsworth; 38 Dan Giese; 21,22 LaTroy Hawkins; 34,65 Phil Hughes; 29 Kei Igawa; 31 Ian Kennedy; 34 Dámaso Marte; 35 Mike Mussina; 39 Ross Ohlendorf; 30 Scott Patterson; 45 Carl Pavano; 46 Andy Pettitte; 47 Sidney Ponson; 36 Edwar Ramírez; 43 Darrell Rasner; 42 Mariano Rivera; 30 David Robertson; 77 Humberto Sánchez; 61 Billy Traber; 41 José Veras; 40 Chien-Ming Wang	Catchers: 64 Francisco Cervelli; 19 Chad Moeller; 26 José Molina; 20 Jorge Posada; 12 Iván Rodríguez; 38 Chris Stewart; Infielders: 14 Wilson Betemit; 24 Robinson Canó; 17 Shelley Duncan; 11 Morgan Ensberg; 25 Jason Giambi; 12 Alberto González; 2 Derek Jeter; 66 Juan Miranda; 29 Cody Ransom; 13 Alex Rodriguez; 39 Richie Sexson	Outfielders: 53 Bobby Abreu; 28 Melky Cabrera; 17 Justin Christian; 18 Johnny Damon; 11 Brett Gardner; 55 Hideki Matsui; 29,22 Xavier Nady	Manager: 27 Joe Girardi; Coaches: 52 Dave Eiland (pitching); 57 Mike Harkey (bullpen); 54 Kevin Long (hitting); 50 Bobby Meacham (3rd base); 60 Rich Monteleone (special pitching instructor); 56 Tony Peña (1st base); 59 Rob Thomson (bench)

=== Game log ===
2008 Game Log
March

#	Date	Opponent	Score	Win	Loss	Save	Attendance	Record
—	March 31	Blue Jays	Postponed (rain) Rescheduled for April 1					

April

#	Date	Opponent	Score	Win	Loss	Save	Attendance	Record
1	April 1	Blue Jays	3–2	Wang (1–0)	Halladay (0–1)	Rivera (1)	55,112	1–0
2	April 2	Blue Jays	5–2	Burnett (1–0)	Mussina (0–1)	Accardo (1)	48,544	1–1
3	April 3	Blue Jays	3–2	Chamberlain (1–0)	Wolfe (0–1)	Rivera (2)	47,785	2–1
4	April 4	Rays	13–4	Sonnanstine (1–0)	Kennedy (0–1)		49,255	2–2
5	April 5	Rays	6–3	Jackson (1–0)	Pettitte (0–1)	Percival (1)	52,247	2–3
6	April 6	Rays	2–0	Wang (2–0)	Shields (1–1)	Rivera (3)	51,279	3–3
7	April 7	Rays	6–1	Mussina (1–1)	Hammel (0–1)		41,302	4–3
8	April 8	@ Royals	5–2	Bannister (2–0)	Hughes (0–1)	Soria (4)	37,296	4–4
9	April 9	@ Royals	4–0	Greinke (2–0)	Farnsworth (0–1)	Gobble (1)	19,007	4–5
10	April 10	@ Royals	6–1	Pettitte (1–1)	Bale (0–2)		16,143	5–5
11	April 11	@ Red Sox	4–1	Wang (3–0)	Timlin (0–1)		37,624	6–5
12	April 12	@ Red Sox	4–3	Beckett (1–1)	Mussina (1–2)	Papelbon (4)	37,461	6–6
13	April 13	@ Red Sox	8–5	Matsuzaka (3–0)	Hughes (0–2)		37,876	6–7
14	April 14	@ Rays	8–7	Bruney (1–0)	Reyes (1–2)	Rivera (4)	18,872	7–7
15	April 15	@ Rays	5–3	Pettitte (2–1)	Jackson (2–1)	Rivera (5)	20,923	8–7
16	April 16	Red Sox	15–9	Hawkins (1–0)	Tavárez (0–1)	Bruney (1)	54,667	9–7
17	April 17	Red Sox	7–5	Beckett (2–1)	Mussina (1–3)		55,088	9–8
18	April 18	@ Orioles	8–2	Cabrera (1–0)	Hughes (0–3)		40,653	9–9
19	April 19	@ Orioles	6–0	Burres (2–1)	Kennedy (0–2)	Johnson (1)	41,776	9–10
20	April 20	@ Orioles	7–1	Pettitte (3–1)	Trachsel (1–3)		37,501	10–10
21	April 22	@ White Sox	9–5	Wang (4–0)	Contreras (1–2)		25,012	11–10
22	April 23	@ White Sox	6–4	Mussina (2–3)	Vázquez (3–2)	Rivera (6)	27,751	12–10
23	April 24	@ White Sox	7–6	Jenks (1–0)	Chamberlain (1–1)		27,243	12–11
24	April 25	@ Indians	6–4	Byrd (1–2)	Pettitte (3–2)	Betancourt (2)	31,467	12–12
25	April 26	@ Indians	4–3	Kobayashi (1–0)	Ohlendorf (0–1)		35,765	12–13
26	April 27	@ Indians	1–0	Wang (5–0)	Sabathia (1–4)	Rivera (7)	31,598	13–13
27	April 28	@ Indians	5–2	Mussina (3–3)	Laffey (0–1)	Rivera (8)	20,689	14–13
28	April 29	Tigers	6–4	Rogers (2–3)	Hughes (0–4)	Jones (5)	49,194	14–14
29	April 30	Tigers	6–2	Bonderman (2–2)	Pettitte (3–3)		49,513	14–15

May

#	Date	Opponent	Score	Win	Loss	Save	Attendance	Record
30	May 1	Tigers	8–4	Robertson (1–3)	Albaladejo (0–1)		50,993	14–16
31	May 2	Mariners	5–1	Wang (6–0)	Bédard (2–1)		52,199	15–16
32	May 3	Mariners	6–1	Mussina (4–3)	Hernández (2–2)		52,810	16–16
33	May 4	Mariners	8–2	Rasner (1–0)	Silva (3–1)		53,542	17–16
34	May 6	Indians	5–3	Pérez (1–1)	Chamberlain (1–2)	Betancourt (3)	50,713	17–17
35	May 7	Indians	3–0	Lee (6–0)	Wang (6–1)	Betancourt (4)	50,199	17–18
36	May 8	Indians	6–3	Mussina (5–3)	Byrd (1–3)	Rivera (9)	53,227	18–18
37	May 9	@ Tigers	6–5	Rogers (3–3)	Igawa (0–1)		44,062	18–19
38	May 10	@ Tigers	5–2	Rasner (2–0)	Bonderman (2–4)	Rivera (10)	44,580	19–19
—	May 11	@ Tigers	Postponed (rain) Rescheduled for September 1					
39	May 12	@ Rays	7–1	Garza (2–1)	Pettitte (3–4)		13,932	19–20
40	May 13	@ Rays	2–1 (11)	Howell (3–0)	Rivera (0–1)		16,558	19–21
41	May 14	@ Rays	2–1	Mussina (6–3)	Shields (4–3)	Rivera (11)	20,936	20–21
42	May 15	@ Rays	5–2	Kazmir (2–1)	Kennedy (0–3)	Percival (10)	19,976	20–22
—	May 16	Mets	Postponed (rain) Rescheduled for June 27					
43	May 17	Mets	7–4	Santana (5–2)	Pettitte (3–5)	Wagner (9)	55,093	20–23
44	May 18	Mets	11–2	Pérez (4–3)	Wang (6–2)		55,012	20–24
45	May 20	Orioles	12–2	Cabrera (5–1)	Mussina (6–4)		51,617	20–25
46	May 21	Orioles	8–0	Rasner (3–0)	Olson (3–1)		50,682	21–25
47	May 22	Orioles	2–1	Rivera (1–1)	Johnson (0–2)		49,452	22–25
48	May 23	Mariners	13–2	Pettitte (4–5)	Bédard (3–3)		52,005	23–25
49	May 24	Mariners	12–6	Mussina (7–4)	Silva (3–4)		53,512	24–25
50	May 25	Mariners	6–5	Ramírez (1–0)	Putz (1–2)	Rivera (12)	54,269	25–25
51	May 26	@ Orioles	6–1	Olson (4–1)	Rasner (3–1)		34,928	25–26
52	May 27	@ Orioles	10–9 (11)	Albers (3–1)	Hawkins (1–1)		24,030	25–27
53	May 28	@ Orioles	4–2	Pettitte (5–5)	Guthrie (2–6)	Rivera (13)	24,791	26–27
54	May 30	@ Twins	6–5	Mussina (8–4)	Perkins (2–2)	Rivera (14)	30,188	27–27
55	May 31	@ Twins	7–6 (12)	Ohlendorf (1–1)	Rincón (2–2)	Rivera (15)	36,441	28–27

June

#	Date	Opponent	Score	Win	Loss	Save	Attendance	Record
56	June 1	@ Twins	5–1	Bass (2–1)	Rasner (3–2)		27,479	28–28
57	June 2	@ Twins	6–5	Gurrier (3–1)	Farnsworth (0–2)	Nathan (15)	20,168	28–29
58	June 3	Blue Jays	9–3	Halladay (7–5)	Giese (0–1)		53,629	28–30
59	June 4	Blue Jays	5–1	Mussina (9–4)	Litsch (7–2)		51,151	29–30
60	June 5	Blue Jays	9–8	Farnsworth (1–2)	Ryan (1–2)		53,571	30–30
61	June 6	Royals	2–1	Kyle Davies (2–0)	Rasner (3–3)	Soria (13)	52,187	30–31
62	June 7	Royals	12–11	Rivera (2–1)	Soria (0–1)		53,611	31–31
63	June 8	Royals	6–3	Giese (1–1)	Greinke (5–4)	Rivera (16)	54,213	32–31
64	June 9	Royals	3–2	Yabuta (1–0)	Rivera (2–2)	Soria (14)	53,633	32–32
65	June 10	@ Athletics	3–1	Wang (7–2)	Eveland (4–5)	Rivera (17)	26,402	33–32
66	June 11	@ Athletics	8–4	Duchscherer (6–4)	Rasner (3–4)		27,292	33–33
67	June 12	@ Athletics	4-1	Pettitte (6–5)	Blanton (3–9)	Rivera (18)	28,658	34–33
68	June 13	@ Astros	2-1	Veras (1–0)	Brocail (2–1)	Farnsworth (1)	43,095	35–33
69	June 14	@ Astros	8–4	Mussina (10–4)	Rodríguez (2–3)		43,409	36–33
70	June 15	@ Astros	13–0	Wang (8–2)	Oswalt (5–7)		43,165	37–33
71	June 17	Padres	8–0	Pettitte (7–5)	Wolf (5–5)		52,306	38–33
72	June 18	Padres	8–5	Rasner (4–4)	Peavy (5–4)	Rivera (19)	52,628	39–33
73	June 19	Padres	2–1	Veras (2–0)	Banks (2–1)	Rivera (20)	54,362	40–33
74	June 20	Reds	4–2	Vólquez (10–2)	Mussina (10–5)	Cordero (14)	53,421	40–34
75	June 21	Reds	6–0	Bray (2–0)	Giese (1–2)		54,509	40–35
76	June 22	Reds	4–1	Pettitte (8–5)	Cueto (5–8)	Rivera (21)	54,234	41–35
77	June 24	@ Pirates	12–5	Gorzelanny (6–6)	Rasner (4–5)		38,867	41–36
78	June 25	@ Pirates	10–0	Chamberlain (2–2)	Duke (4–5)		38,952	42–36
—	June 26	@ Pirates	Postponed (rain) Rescheduled for July 10					
79	June 27	Mets	15–6	Pelfrey (5–6)	Giese (1–3)		54,978	42–37
80	June 27	@ Mets	9–0	Ponson (5–1)	Martínez (2–2)		56,308	43–37
81	June 28	@ Mets	3–2	Pettitte (9–5)	Santana (7–7)	Rivera (22)	56,172	44–37
82	June 29	@ Mets	3–1	Pérez (6–5)	Rasner (4–6)	Wagner (18)	56,277	44–38
83	June 30	Rangers	2–1	Feldman (2–3)	Mussina (10–6)	Wilson (18)	53,045	44–39

July

#	Date	Opponent	Score	Win	Loss	Save	Attendance	Record
84	July 1	Rangers	3–2	Francisco (2–2)	Rivera (2–3)	Wilson (19)	53,223	44–40
85	July 2	Rangers	18–7	Ramírez (2–0)	Madrigal (0–1)		52,659	45–40
86	July 3	Red Sox	7–0	Lester (7–3)	Pettitte (9–6)		54,677	45–41
87	July 4	Red Sox	6–4	Beckett (8–5)	Rasner (4–7)		55,130	45–42
88	July 5	Red Sox	2–1	Mussina (11–6)	Masterson (4–3)	Rivera (23)	54,920	46–42
89	July 6	Red Sox	5–4 (10)	Rivera (3–3)	Papelbon (3–3)		54,922	47–42
90	July 8	Rays	5–0	Pettitte (10–6)	Kazmir (7–4)		53,089	48–42
91	July 9	Rays	2–1 (10)	Rivera (4–3)	Balfour (2–1)		53,552	49–42
92	July 10	@ Pirates	4–2	Maholm (6–5)	Veras (2–1)	Marte (4)	39,081	49–43
93	July 11	@ Blue Jays	5–0	Halladay (11–6)	Chamberlain (2–3)		43,078	49–44
94	July 12	@ Blue Jays	9–4	Rasner (5–7)	Litsch (8–6)		44,364	50–44
95	July 13	@ Blue Jays	4–1	Burnett (10–8)	Pettitte (10–7)	Ryan (18)	43,854	50–45
96	July 18	Athletics	7–1	Mussina (12–6)	Smith (5–8)		54,145	51–45
97	July 19	Athletics	4–3 (12)	Robertson (1–0)	DiNardo (1–2)		54,183	52–45
98	July 20	Athletics	2–1	Pettitte (11–7)	Duchscherer (10–6)	Rivera (24)	54,366	53–45
99	July 21	Twins	12–4	Ponson (6–1)	Blackburn (7–6)		53,484	54–45
100	July 22	Twins	8–2	Robertson (2–0)	Slowey (6–7)		53,406	55–45
101	July 23	Twins	5–1	Mussina (13–6)	Perkins (7–3)	Rivera (25)	54,114	56–45
102	July 25	@ Red Sox	1–0	Chamberlain (3–3)	Beckett (9–7)	Rivera (26)	37,744	57–45
103	July 26	@ Red Sox	10–3	Pettitte (12–7)	Wakefield (6–8)		37,225	58–45
104	July 27	@ Red Sox	9–2	Lester (9–3)	Ponson (6–2)		37,688	58–46
105	July 28	Orioles	13–4	Guthrie (7–8)	Mussina (13–7)		54,120	58–47
106	July 29	Orioles	7–6	Cabrera (7–6)	Rasner (5–8)		54,241	58–48
107	July 30	Orioles	13–3	Chamberlain (4–3)	Sarfate (4–2)		54,296	59–48
108	July 31	Angels	12–6	Garland (10–6)	Pettitte (12–8)		53,405	59–49

August

#	Date	Opponent	Score	Win	Loss	Save	Attendance	Record
109	August 1	Angels	1–0	Santana (12–5)	Rivera (4–4)	Rodríguez (45)	53,997	59–50
110	August 2	Angels	8–2	Mussina (14–7)	Weaver (9–9)		54,170	60–50
111	August 3	Angels	14–9	Ramírez (3–0)	Shields (4–3)		54,204	61–50
112	August 4	@ Rangers	9–5	Guardado (3–2)	Marte (4–1)		33,813	61–51
113	August 5	@ Rangers	8–6	Harrison (3–2)	Pettitte (12–9)	Guardado (3)	34,473	61–52
114	August 6	@ Rangers	5–3	Ponson (7–2)	Hunter (0–1)	Rivera (27)	38,638	62–52
115	August 7	@ Rangers	3–0	Mussina (15–7)	Feldman (4–5)	Rivera (28)	44,603	63–52
116	August 8	@ Angels	10–5	Weaver (10–9)	Kennedy (0–4)		44,158	63–53
117	August 9	@ Angels	11–4	Shields (5–3)	Ramírez (3–1)		43,919	63–54
118	August 10	@ Angels	4–3	Rodríguez (2–2)	Marte (4–2)		44,138	63–55
119	August 11	@ Twins	4–0	Perkins (9–3)	Ponson (7–3)		30,126	63–56
120	August 12	@ Twins	9–6 (12)	Veras (3–1)	Guerrier (6–6)	Ramírez (1)	33,036	64–56
121	August 13	@ Twins	4–2	Slowey (9–8)	Rasner (5–9)	Nathan (32)	35,187	64–57
122	August 15	Royals	4–3	Núñez (4–1)	Rivera (4–5)	Soria (33)	53,067	64–58
123	August 16	Royals	3–2 (13)	Robertson (3–0)	Fulchino (0–1)		54,180	65–58
124	August 17	Royals	15–6	Mussina (16–7)	Bannister (7–12)		54,114	66–58
125	August 19	@ Blue Jays	2–1	Burnett (16–9)	Veras (3–2)	Ryan (24)	37,221	66–59
126	August 20	@ Blue Jays	5–1	Pettitte (13–9)	Purcey (2–4)		34,910	67–59
127	August 21	@ Blue Jays	14–3	Halladay (15–9)	Ponson (7–4)		37,037	67–60
128	August 22	@ Orioles	9–4	Veras (4–2)	Walker (1–1)	Rivera (29)	45,543	68–60
129	August 23	@ Orioles	5–3	Pavano (1–0)	Guthrie (10–10)	Rivera (30)	48,817	69–60
130	August 24	@ Orioles	8–7	Ramírez (4–1)	Walker (1–2)	Rivera (31)	42,746	70–60
131	August 26	Red Sox	7–3	Wakefield (8–8)	Pettitte (13–10)	Papelbon (34)	55,058	70–61
132	August 27	Red Sox	11–3	Byrd (9–11)	Ponson (7–5)		55,027	70–62
133	August 28	Red Sox	3–2	Rivera (5–5)	Masterson (4–4)		55,092	71–62
134	August 29	Blue Jays	2–1	Pavano (2–0)	Burnett (16–10)	Rivera (32)	53,088	72–62
135	August 30	Blue Jays	7–6	League (1–2)	Marte (4–3)	Ryan (25)	53,273	72–63
136	August 31	Blue Jays	6–2	Halladay (17–9)	Pettitte (13–11)		53,634	72–64

September

#	Date	Opponent	Score	Win	Loss	Save	Attendance	Record
137	September 1	@ Tigers	13–9	Bruney (2–0)	Verlander (10–15)		44,336	73–64
138	September 2	@ Rays	7–2	Mussina (17–7)	Garza (11–8)		21,629	74–64
139	September 3	@ Rays	8–4	Ramírez (5–1)	Jackson (11–9)		25,215	75–64
140	September 4	@ Rays	7–5	Kazmir (11–6)	Rasner (5–10)	Wheeler (10)	26,080	75–65
141	September 5	@ Mariners	3–1	Morrow (2–2)	Pettitte (13–12)	Putz (11)	39,518	75–66
142	September 6	@ Mariners	7–4	Ponson (8–5)	Green (4–5)	Rivera (33)	44,473	76–66
143	September 7	@ Mariners	5–2	Feierabend (1–2)	Mussina (17–8)	Putz (12)	42,677	76–67
144	September 8	@ Angels	12–1	Garland (13–8)	Pavano (2–1)		41,025	76–68
145	September 9	@ Angels	7–1	Aceves (1–0)	Santana (15–6)		43,042	77–68
146	September 10	@ Angels	4–2	Moseley (2–4)	Pettitte (13–13)	Rodríguez (56)	39,783	77–69
--	September 12	Rays	Postponed (rain) Rescheduled for September 13					
147	September 13	Rays	7–1	Shields (13–8)	Mussina (17–9)		54,088	77–70
148	September 13	Rays	6–5	Marte (5–3)	Howell (6–1)	Rivera (34)	53,568	78–70
149	September 14	Rays	8–4	Pavano (3–1)	Jackson (11–11)	Rivera (35)	54,279	79–70
150	September 15	White Sox	4–2	Coke (1–0)	Wassermann (1–2)	Rivera (36)	53,236	80–70
151	September 16	White Sox	6–2	Floyd (16–7)	Pettitte (13–14)		52,558	80–71
152	September 17	White Sox	5–1	Bruney (3–0)	Richard (2–5)		52,671	81–71
153	September 18	White Sox	9–2	Mussina (18–9)	Vázquez (12–14)		53,152	82–71
154	September 19	Orioles	3–2	Pavano (4–1)	Liz (6–6)	Rivera (37)	54,136	83–71
155	September 20	Orioles	1–0	Rivera (6–5)	Miller (0–2)		54,662	84–71
156	September 21	Orioles	7–3	Pettitte (14–14)	Waters (3–4)		54,610	85–71
157	September 23	@ Blue Jays	3–1	Mussina (19–9)	Litsch (12–9)	Rivera (38)	27,216	86–71
158	September 24	@ Blue Jays	6–2 (10)	Veras (5–2)	Carlson (7–2)		28,701	87–71
159	September 25	@ Blue Jays	8–2	Halladay (20–11)	Pavano (4–2)		44,346	87–72
160	September 26	@ Red Sox	19–8	Robertson (4–0)	Pauley (0–1)		37,301	88–72
--	September 27	@ Red Sox	Postponed (rain) Rescheduled for September 28					
161	September 28	@ Red Sox	6–2	Mussina (20–9)	Matsuzaka (18–3)	Rivera (39)	37,091	89–72
162	September 28	@ Red Sox	4–3 (10)	Hansack (1–0)	Veras (5–3)		37,440	89–73

== Player stats ==
Bold= Team leader in category.

=== Batting ===
Note: G = Games played; AB = At Bats; R = Runs scored; H = Hits; 2B = Doubles; 3B = Triples; HR = Home runs; RBI = Runs batted in; AVG = Batting average; SB = Stolen bases

Player	G	AB	R	H	2B	3B	HR	RBI	AVG	SB
Robinson Canó	**159**	597	70	162	35	3	14	72	.271	2
Bobby Abreu	156	**609**	100	**180**	**39**	4	20	100	.296	22
Derek Jeter	150	596	88	179	25	3	11	69	.300	11
Jason Giambi	145	459	68	113	19	1	32	96	.247	2
Johnny Damon	143	555	95	168	27	**5**	17	71	**.303**	**29**
Alex Rodriguez	138	510	**104**	154	33	0	**35**	**103**	.302	18
Melky Cabrera	129	414	42	103	12	1	8	37	.249	9
José Molina	100	268	32	58	17	0	3	18	.216	0
Hideki Matsui	93	337	43	99	17	0	9	45	.294	0
Wilson Betemit	87	189	24	50	13	0	6	25	.265	0
Xavier Nady	59	228	26	61	11	0	12	40	.268	1
Jorge Posada	51	168	18	45	13	1	3	22	.268	0
Brett Gardner	42	127	18	29	5	2	0	16	.228	13
Chad Moeller	41	91	13	21	6	0	1	9	.231	0
Iván Rodríguez	33	96	11	21	4	0	2	3	.219	4
Cody Ransom	33	43	9	13	3	0	4	8	.302	0
Alberto González	28	52	4	9	2	0	0	1	.173	0
Morgan Ensberg	28	74	6	15	0	0	1	4	.203	0
Justin Christian	24	40	6	10	3	0	0	6	.250	7
Shelley Duncan	23	57	7	10	3	0	1	6	.175	0
Richie Sexson	22	28	2	7	1	0	1	6	.250	0
José Veras	5	0	0	0	0	0	0	0	.000	0
Juan Miranda	5	10	2	4	1	0	0	1	.400	0
Kyle Farnsworth	5	0	0	0	0	0	0	0	.000	0
Edwar Ramírez	4	0	0	0	0	0	0	0	.000	0
David Robertson	3	0	0	0	0	0	0	0	.000	0
Ross Ohlendorf	3	1	0	0	0	0	0	0	.000	0
Francisco Cervelli	3	5	0	0	0	0	0	0	.000	0
Mike Mussina	2	5	0	1	0	0	0	0	.200	0
Darrell Rasner	2	1	0	0	0	0	0	0	.000	0
LaTroy Hawkins	2	0	0	0	0	0	0	0	.000	0
Joba Chamberlain	2	3	0	0	0	0	0	0	.000	0
Chris Britton	2	0	0	0	0	0	0	0	.000	0
Dan Giese	1	0	0	0	0	0	0	0	.000	0
Billy Traber	1	0	0	0	0	0	0	0	.000	0
Mariano Rivera	1	0	0	0	0	0	0	0	.000	0
Andy Pettitte	1	2	0	0	0	0	0	0	.000	0
Sidney Ponson	1	2	0	0	0	0	0	0	.000	0
Chien-Ming Wang	1	3	1	0	0	0	0	0	.000	0
Chris Stewart	1	3	0	0	0	0	0	0	.000	0
Kei Igawa	1	0	0	0	0	0	0	0	.000	0
**Team totals**	**162**	**5572**	**789**	**1512**	**289**	**20**	**180**	**758**	**.271**	**118**

Bold indicates team leader

=== Pitching ===
Note: W = Wins; L = Losses; ERA = Earned run average; G = Games pitched; GS = Games started; SV = Saves; IP = Innings pitched; R = Runs allowed; ER = Earned runs allowed; BB = Walks allowed; K = Strikeouts

Player	W	L	ERA	G	GS	SV	IP	R	ER	BB	K
Mike Mussina	**20**	9	**3.37**	34	**34**	0	200.1	85	75	31	150
Andy Pettitte	14	**14**	4.54	33	33	0	**204.0**	**112**	**103**	**55**	**158**
Chien-Ming Wang	8	2	4.07	15	15	0	95.0	44	43	35	54
Mariano Rivera	6	5	1.40	**64**	0	**39**	70.2	11	11	6	77
Darrell Rasner	5	10	5.40	24	20	0	113.1	74	68	39	67
Edwar Ramírez	5	1	3.90	55	0	1	55.1	25	24	24	63
José Veras	5	3	3.59	60	0	0	57.2	23	23	29	63
David Robertson	4	0	5.34	25	0	0	30.1	18	18	15	36
Joba Chamberlain	4	3	2.60	42	12	0	100.1	32	29	39	118
Sidney Ponson	4	4	5.85	16	15	0	80.0	53	52	32	33
Carl Pavano	4	2	5.77	7	7	0	34.1	23	22	10	15
Brian Bruney	3	0	1.83	32	1	1	34.1	7	7	16	33
Ross Ohlendorf	1	1	6.53	25	0	0	40.0	31	29	19	36
LaTroy Hawkins	1	1	5.71	33	0	0	41.0	26	26	17	23
Dámaso Marte	1	3	5.40	25	0	0	18.1	11	11	10	24
Kyle Farnsworth	1	2	3.65	45	0	1	44.1	18	18	17	43
Dan Giese	1	3	3.53	20	3	0	43.1	22	17	14	29
Phil Coke	1	0	0.61	12	0	0	14.2	1	1	2	14
Alfredo Aceves	1	0	2.40	6	4	0	30.0	8	8	10	16
Scott Patterson	0	0	6.75	1	0	0	1.1	1	1	2	2
Jonathan Albaladejo	0	1	3.95	7	0	0	13.2	6	6	6	13
Phil Hughes	0	4	6.62	8	8	0	34.0	26	25	15	23
Billy Traber	0	0	7.02	19	0	0	16.2	13	13	7	11
Chris Britton	0	0	5.09	15	0	0	23.0	13	13	11	12
Humberto Sánchez	0	0	4.50	2	0	0	2.0	1	1	2	1
Kei Igawa	0	1	13.50	2	1	0	4.0	6	6	0	0
Ian Kennedy	0	4	8.17	10	9	0	39.2	37	36	26	27
**Team totals**	**89**	**73**	**4.28**	**162**	**162**	**42**	**1441.2**	**727**	**686**	**489**	**1141**

Bold indicates team leader for W, L, ERA, G, GS, SV, and IP; indicates highest on team in R, ER, BB, and K

== Awards and honors ==
All-Star Game

- Alex Rodriguez, 3B, Starter
- Derek Jeter, SS, Starter
- Mariano Rivera, P, Reserve

== Farm system ==
Level	Team	League	Manager
AAA	Scranton/Wilkes-Barre Yankees	International League	Dave Miley
AA	Trenton Thunder	Eastern League	Tony Franklin
A	Tampa Yankees	Florida State League	Luis Sojo
A	Charleston RiverDogs	South Atlantic League	Torre Tyson
A-Short Season	Staten Island Yankees	New York–Penn League	Pat McMahon
Rookie	GCL Yankees	Gulf Coast League	Jody Reed

LEAGUE CHAMPIONS: Scranton/Wilkes-Barre, Trenton
