= David Purcey =

American baseball player (born 1982)

- Pitcher
- Born: April 22, 1982 (age 43); St. Charles, Illinois, U.S.
- Batted: Left Threw: Left

Professional debut
- MLB: April 18, 2008, for the Toronto Blue Jays
- CPBL: March 26, 2015, for the Uni-President 7-Eleven Lions

Last appearance
- MLB: September 20, 2013, for the Chicago White Sox
- CPBL: April 26, 2015, for the Uni-President 7-Eleven Lions

MLB statistics
- Win–loss record: 7–13
- Earned run average: 4.98
- Strikeouts: 174

CPBL statistics
- Win–loss record: 0–1
- Earned run average: 4.87
- Strikeouts: 19
- Stats at Baseball Reference

Teams
- Toronto Blue Jays (2008–2011); Oakland Athletics (2011); Detroit Tigers (2011); Chicago White Sox (2013); Uni-President 7-Eleven Lions (2015)

David Kent Purcey (born April 22, 1982) is an American former professional baseball pitcher. He played in Major League Baseball (MLB) for the Toronto Blue Jays, Oakland Athletics, Detroit Tigers, and Chicago White Sox, and in the Chinese Professional Baseball League (CPBL) for the Uni-President 7-Eleven Lions.

== Amateur career ==
Purcey attended high school at Trinity Christian Academy in Addison, Texas, and then attended the University of Oklahoma, where he played for the Sooners baseball team. In 2003, he played collegiate summer baseball with the Orleans Cardinals of the Cape Cod Baseball League and was named a league all-star.

== Professional career ==
=== Draft ===
Purcey originally was drafted in the 2001 MLB draft by the Seattle Mariners in the 20th round. He then was drafted again by the New York Yankees in the 17th round of the 2003 MLB draft, and finally drafted once again by Toronto in the first round (16th overall) during the 2004 MLB draft.

=== Toronto Blue Jays ===
Purcey made his major league debut on April 18, 2008, starting against the Detroit Tigers and allowing one earned run over 4 1/3 innings. He was returned to the minor leagues after two major league appearances, but was recalled to the Blue Jays in July, and ended the 2008 season in the team's starting rotation. On August 27, 2008, Purcey started against the Tampa Bay Rays and pitched his first career major league complete game. He recorded 11 strikeouts and scattered five hits through eight innings of work.

Following spring training 2009, Purcey earned the third spot in the rotation, but switched spots with Jesse Litsch to separate the left-handers. Purcey was second in the rotation until May 1, 2009, when he was assigned to the Toronto Blue Jays AAA affiliate Las Vegas 51s. Purcey went on to split the remainder of the season between the Blue Jays and Las Vegas. He posted a record of 1–3 and a 6.19 ERA in nine starts with Toronto in 2009. He often struggled with his command, which improved somewhat with Las Vegas.

On May 24, 2010, Purcey was recalled by Toronto and moved to the bullpen as a relief pitcher after Dana Eveland was designated for assignment. On July 26, 2010, Purcey recorded his first major league save against the Baltimore Orioles in a 9–5 win.

He was designated for assignment on April 12, 2011.

=== Oakland Athletics ===
On April 18, 2011, Purcey was traded to the Oakland Athletics in exchange for minor league relief pitcher Danny Farquhar. Purcey was acquired after injuries to Rich Harden and Dallas Braden.

=== Detroit Tigers ===
On May 27, 2011, Purcey was traded to the Detroit Tigers for Scott Sizemore. Purcey was designated for assignment on August 2, he cleared waivers and was sent outright to Triple-A Toledo Mud Hens on August 10 . He elected free agency following the season on November 2.

=== Philadelphia Phillies ===
On December 9, 2011, Purcey signed a minor league contract with the Philadelphia Phillies. He also received an invitation to spring training. Purcey spent the year with Triple-A Lehigh Valley, going 1–4 with a 4.37 ERA in 47 games (one start) while striking out 63 in 57.2 innings pitched. He became a free agent following the season on November 2.

=== Chicago White Sox ===
On November 21, 2012, Purcey signed a minor league deal with the Chicago White Sox. He started the 2013 season with the Triple–A Charlotte Knights. On July 3, 2013, his contract was purchased by the White Sox to replace Jesse Crain who was placed on the disabled list. While with the White Sox, Purcey suffered a strained ulnar collateral ligament in his left elbow during the last week of the 2013 season. He was removed from the 40–man roster and sent outright to Charlotte on October 18. Purcey subsequently rejected the assignment and elected free agency.

The White Sox re–signed Purcey to a minor league contract that included an invitation to spring training on November 8, 2013. In 12 games for Charlotte in 2014, he posted an 0–2 record and 4.58 ERA with 15 strikeouts and 2 saves across 19 2/3 innings pitched. On May 12, 2014, Purcey was released by the White Sox organization.

=== Somerset Patriots ===
On July 18, 2014, Purcey signed with the Somerset Patriots of the Atlantic League of Professional Baseball. He became a free agent following the season. He appeared in 9 games (7 starts) 39.2 innings going 3-0 with a 2.72 ERA with 36 strikeouts.

=== Uni-President 7-Eleven Lions ===
On March 2, 2015, Purcey signed with the Uni-President 7-Eleven Lions of the Chinese Professional Baseball League. He was released on May 31.
