= Buck Coats =

American baseball player (born 1982)

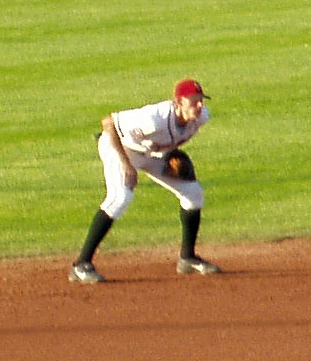
- Coats playing for the Lansing Lugnuts in 2003
- Outfielder
- Born: June 9, 1982 (age 43); Fort Benning, Georgia, U.S.
- Batted: Left Threw: Right

MLB debut
- August 22, 2006, for the Chicago Cubs

Last appearance
- April 11, 2008, for the Toronto Blue Jays

Career statistics
- Batting average: .193
- Home runs: 1
- Runs batted in: 3
- Stats at Baseball Reference

Teams
- Chicago Cubs (2006); Cincinnati Reds (2007); Toronto Blue Jays (2008)
Medals
Men's baseball
Representing United States
Baseball World Cup
Gold medal – first place	2009 Nettuno	National team

Buck Coats (born June 9, 1982) is an American former Major League Baseball (MLB) outfielder.

== Career ==
Coats was drafted in the 18th round (523rd overall) of the 2000 MLB draft by the Chicago Cubs.

Coats made his Major League debut for the Cubs on August 22, 2006, against the Philadelphia Phillies. After the 2006 season, he finished batting .167 with one home run and one RBI.

Coats was then traded to the Reds for a player to be named later. Buck finished hitting .206 and two RBIs, a personal best. The Reds then dealt him to the Toronto Blue Jays for right-handed pitcher Justin James.

Coats only played eight games for the Blue Jays before being sent back down to the minors. He finished the season batting .200, with one hit, and a single stolen base.

Coats signed a minor league contract with the Kansas City Royals on November 25, 2009. Coats was traded to the Chicago White Sox organization and assigned to the AA Birmingham Barons on May 4, 2010. Coats hit .338 with two home runs and 8 RBI in 68 at-bats with the Barons before being promoted to the Triple-A Charlotte Knights.

On December 15, 2010, Coats signed a minor league contract with the Washington Nationals. Due to injury, he was limited to only nine games with the Double-A Harrisburg Senators, batting .261 with 3 RBI.

In 2015, Coats, along with Alexis Gómez, were named co-hitting coaches of the Orem Owlz, the minor league rookie affiliate of the Los Angeles Angels.
