= Chris Waters (baseball) =

American baseball player (born 1980)

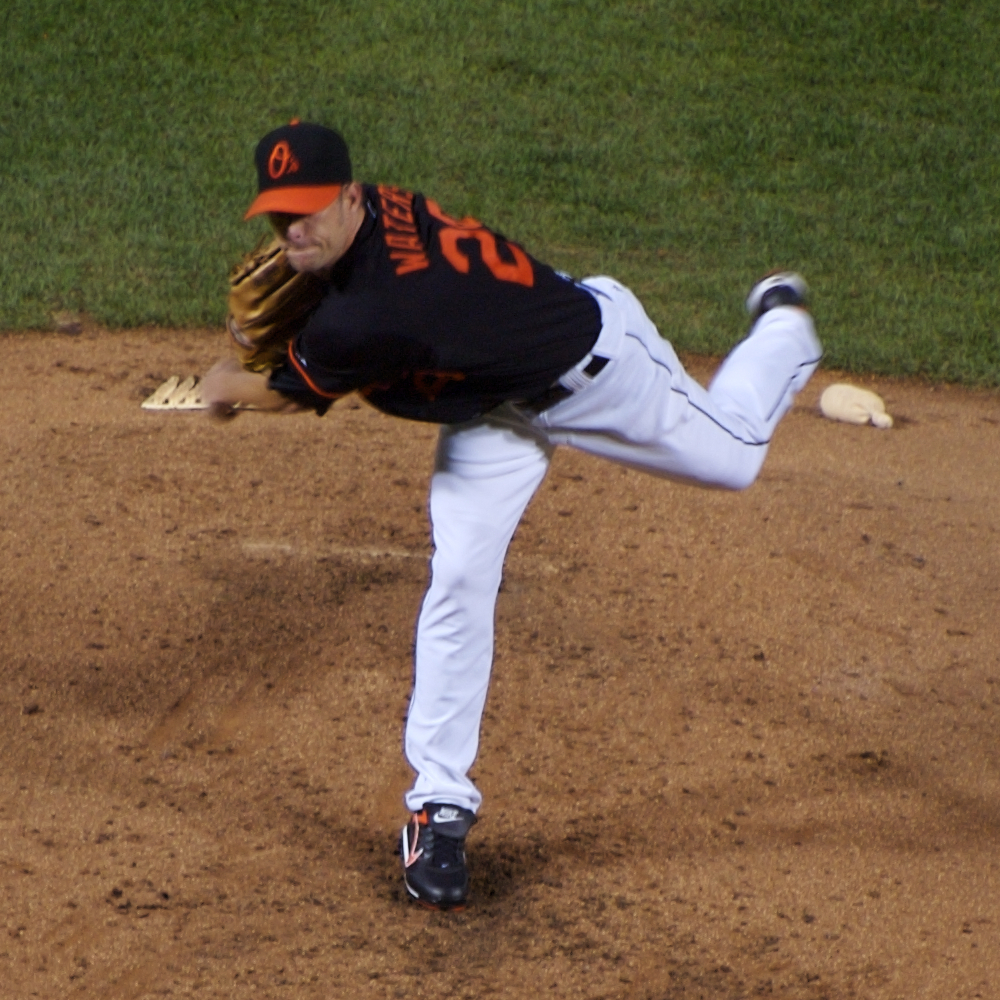
- Waters with the Baltimore Orioles
- Pitcher
- Born: August 17, 1980 (age 44); Lakeland, Florida, U.S.
- Batted: Left Threw: Left

MLB debut
- August 5, 2008, for the Baltimore Orioles

Last MLB appearance
- October 2, 2009, for the Baltimore Orioles

MLB statistics
- Win–loss record: 4–5
- Earned run average: 5.07
- Strikeouts: 38
- Stats at Baseball Reference

Teams
- Baltimore Orioles (2008–2009)

Christopher Myron Waters (born August 17, 1980) is an American former professional baseball starting pitcher. He pitched two seasons in Major League Baseball (MLB) for the Baltimore Orioles. Waters was originally drafted by the Atlanta Braves in the fifth round (160th overall) of the 2000 Major League Baseball draft.

Waters made his major league debut with the Orioles on August 5, 2008, against the Los Angeles Angels of Anaheim. He went eight shutout innings in Baltimore's 3–0 win, giving up only one hit. Later that same season, he threw a complete-game shutout against the Toronto Blue Jays on September 16. Before being called up to the majors, he made 166 starts in 193 games in the minor leagues.

Waters made the start for the Orioles in the final game at Yankee Stadium on September 21, 2008, getting the loss in a 7–3 Yankees victory.

In 2009, Waters played for Tomateros de Culiacán of the Mexican Pacific League where he went 3-1 with a 3.98 earned run average. The lefty struck out 28 batters in 40.2 innings pitched while allowing just 32 hits.

He played for the York Revolution in the Atlantic League of Professional Baseball in 2012, and signed with the Na Koa Ikaika Maui of the Pacific Association of Professional Baseball Clubs for 2013.
