= Jesse Carlson =

American baseball player (born 1980)

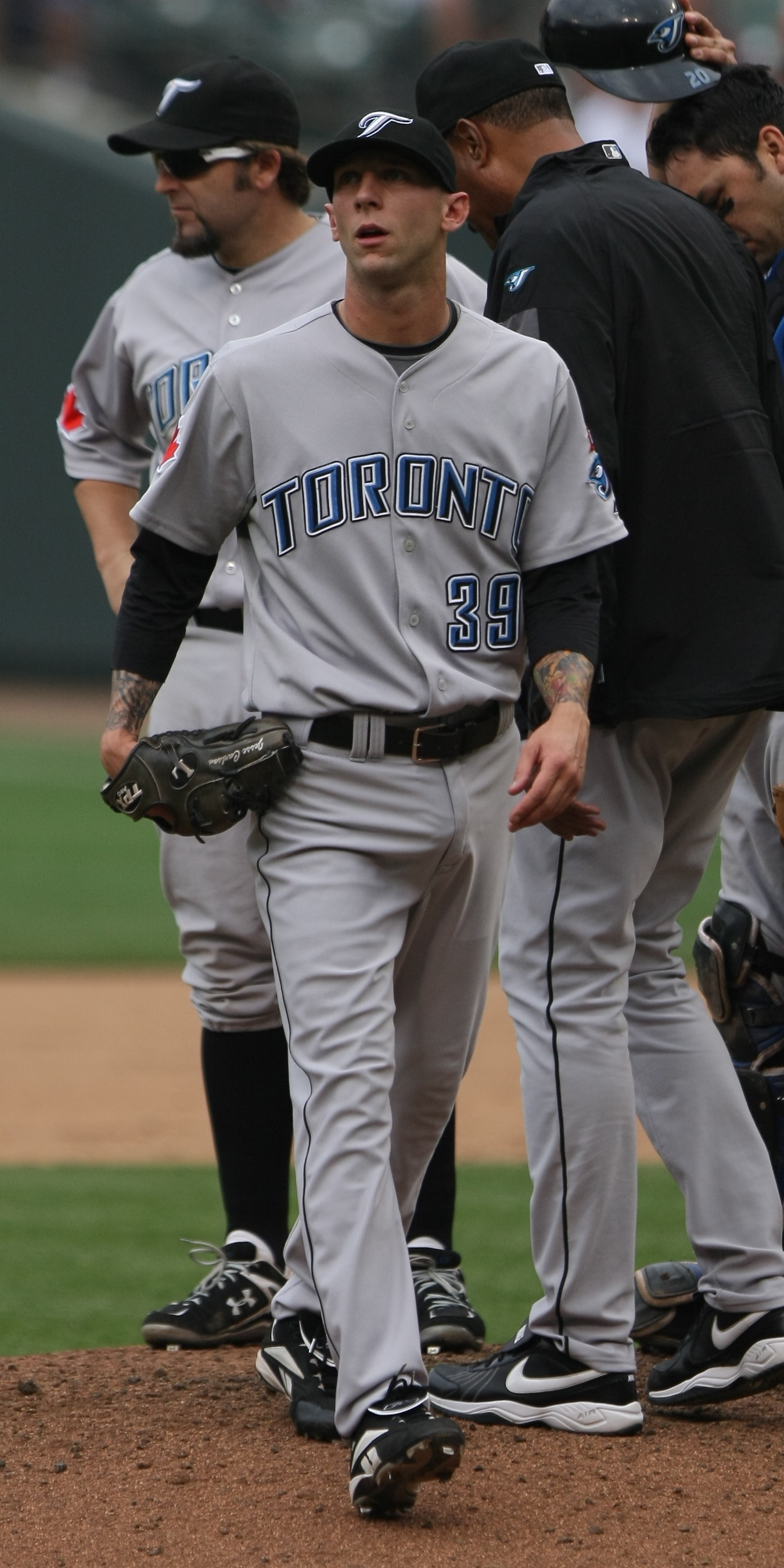
- Carlson with the Toronto Blue Jays
- Pitcher
- Born: December 31, 1980 (age 44); New Britain, Connecticut, U.S.
- Batted: Left Threw: Left

MLB debut
- April 10, 2008, for the Toronto Blue Jays

Last MLB appearance
- October 3, 2010, for the Toronto Blue Jays

MLB statistics
- Win–loss record: 8–8
- Earned run average: 3.63
- Strikeouts: 114
- Stats at Baseball Reference

Teams
- Toronto Blue Jays (2008–2010)

Jesse Craig Carlson (born December 31, 1980) is an American former professional baseball pitcher. He played in Major League Baseball (MLB) for the Toronto Blue Jays.

== Amateur career ==
Born in New Britain, Connecticut, Carlson graduated from Berlin High School, where he starred in basketball as well as baseball. Carlson was a member of the team that defeated Seymour High School to win the state championship in 1999. After high school, Carlson was awarded Big East rookie honors while pitching for the University of Connecticut, where he lettered in baseball for three straight years (2000 to 2002). In 2001, he played collegiate summer baseball in the Cape Cod Baseball League for the Yarmouth-Dennis Red Sox.

== Professional career ==
Carlson was drafted by the Detroit Tigers in 2002. He remained in the minor leagues for seven seasons with four different organizations before making his major league debut with the Toronto Blue Jays on April 10, 2008. He entered the game against the Oakland Athletics in the top of the twelfth inning with the bases loaded after Brandon League allowed two runs to Oakland, breaking the game's tie. Carlson struck out Daric Barton to end the inning.

A few days later, against the Texas Rangers at the Rogers Centre on April 16, Carlson came on in the 11th inning with the bases loaded and no one out. In an amazing and very rare feat, he struck out the side on 12 pitches, marking the first time since 1960 that a reliever came into a game in extra innings with the opponent's team loading the bases with no outs and striking out the side. Carlson also became the first pitcher in MLB history to achieve the feat on only his third game played. Carlson then pitched the 12th inning and was relieved before the start of the 13th. Ultimately the effort was in vain because the Jays lost in the 15th inning and A. J. Burnett was the losing pitcher in relief (his first relief appearance since 2004).

At the end of the 2008 season, he held a 7–2 record, becoming the winningest reliever for the club since Paul Quantrill had 11 wins in the 2001 season.

During a game against the New York Yankees on September 15, 2009, Carlson threw a pitch behind Jorge Posada, causing Posada to take exception of the pitch and leading to both dugouts emptying. Posada would eventually walk then score a run. After Posada crossed home plate, Carlson was bumped and Posada was ejected for taunting after he bumped into Carlson. Posada charged at Carlson causing a brawl in which both dugouts and bullpens cleared. Carlson and Posada were both ejected and suspended three games.

On December 11, 2011, the Boston Red Sox signed Carlson to a minor league contract. He also received an invitation to spring training. On June 16, 2012, the Red Sox released Carlson.

== Pitching style ==
Carlson primarily relied on his 88–90 mph four-seam fastball and his 81–85 MPH slider. He also threw an occasional curveball from 77 to 80 mph, an 80–84 mph changeup, and a rare two-seam fastball at 82–84 mph.
