= Dan Giese =

American baseball player (born 1977)

- Pitcher
- Born: May 19, 1977 (age 49); Anaheim, California, U.S.
- Batted: Right Threw: Right

MLB debut
- September 8, 2007, for the San Francisco Giants

Last MLB appearance
- May 15, 2009, for the Oakland Athletics

MLB statistics
- Win–loss record: 1–8
- Earned run average: 4.22
- Strikeouts: 47
- Stats at Baseball Reference

Teams
- San Francisco Giants (2007); New York Yankees (2008); Oakland Athletics (2009)

Daniel Joshua Giese (/ˈɡaɪs/ GHYSSE; born May 19, 1977) is an American professional baseball pitcher and scout. He played in Major League Baseball for the San Francisco Giants, New York Yankees, and Oakland Athletics. He is a scout for the Yankees.

== Career ==
=== Early career ===
Giese graduated from Rubidoux High School in Riverside, California, and then graduated from the University of San Diego, where he played college baseball for the Toreros from 1996-1998.

The Boston Red Sox selected Giese in the 34th round of the 1999 Major League Baseball draft. The Red Sox traded Giese to the San Diego Padres with Brad Baker in exchange for Alan Embree on June 23, 2002.

Giese spent the 2002 season and the first month of 2003 in the Padres minor league system before being traded for future considerations to the Philadelphia Phillies.

Giese pitched for the Triple-A Scranton/Wilkes-Barre Red Barons and Double-A Reading Phillies from 2004 through 2006. He briefly retired during the 2005 season and finished his degree from the University of San Diego.

=== San Francisco Giants ===
On January 8, 2007, Giese signed a minor league contract with the San Francisco Giants. He was a non-roster invitee to the team's spring training. Giese made his MLB debut with the Giants on September 8, 2007, tossing two scoreless innings in a 6-2 loss to the Los Angeles Dodgers. Giese made eight relief appearances with the Giants, recording an ERA of 4.82.

=== New York Yankees ===
Giese signed a minor league contract with the New York Yankees in the 2007-2008 offseason. The Yankees purchased Giese's contract from Triple-A on June 3, 2008, and added him to the active roster. He was optioned back to Triple-A one-day later. Giese was called up again on June 6, 2008, due to an injury to Chris Britton.

On June 8, 2008, Giese pitched 2 2/3 innings of hitless relief for his first major league victory. On June 21, Giese made his first career start against the Cincinnati Reds replacing the injured Chien-Ming Wang, tossing 6 2/3 innings while allowing three runs (all unearned) in a 6-0 loss. On August 15, 2008, Giese was placed on the 15-day disabled list with right rotator cuff tendinitis. After recovering, Giese returned to the Yankee bullpen with a scoreless inning of relief against the Tampa Bay Rays on September 2, 2008.

On April 4, 2009, Giese was designated for assignment to make room for infielder Ramiro Peña.

=== Oakland Athletics ===
The Oakland Athletics claimed Giese off of waivers on April 8. He would pitch in seven games (one start) for the Athletics, going 0-3 with a 5.32 ERA. On May 18, Giese was placed on the disabled list due to a nerve issue in his right elbow. He had season-ending Tommy John surgery in June, and was expected to miss 12 to 18 months. In October 2009, he was granted free agency. On January 27, 2010, Giese re-signed with the A's on a minor league contract. He began the season with the Triple-A Sacramento River Cats, making eight relief appearances while recording a 1.74 ERA before suffering a torn labrum. He announced his retirement after the season.

=== Scouting ===
In January 2014, the Yankees hired Giese as a scout. When Kevin Reese was promoted to director of player development in 2017, the Yankees promoted Giese to succeed Reese as director of professional scouting.

== Personal life ==
Giese and his wife Shannon were married on December 28, 2001. Shannon was a diver at the University of San Diego. Their daughter Avery was born on January 7, 2006. She was a multiple-time junior national champion in diving and currently dives at the University of Kentucky.

Their son, Gavin, was born on November 4, 2007. Gavin attended Dana Hills High School and pitched to a 1.13 ERA and 42 strikeouts as a junior. He was committed to the UC San Diego Tritons and a top prospect for the 2026 Major League Baseball draft. He was drafted in the 3rd round (85th pick) by the Tampa Bay Rays in the draft. He signed with the Rays for a signing bonus of $997.5 thousand on Draft Signing Deadline Day.
