= Jesse Litsch =

American baseball player (born 1985)

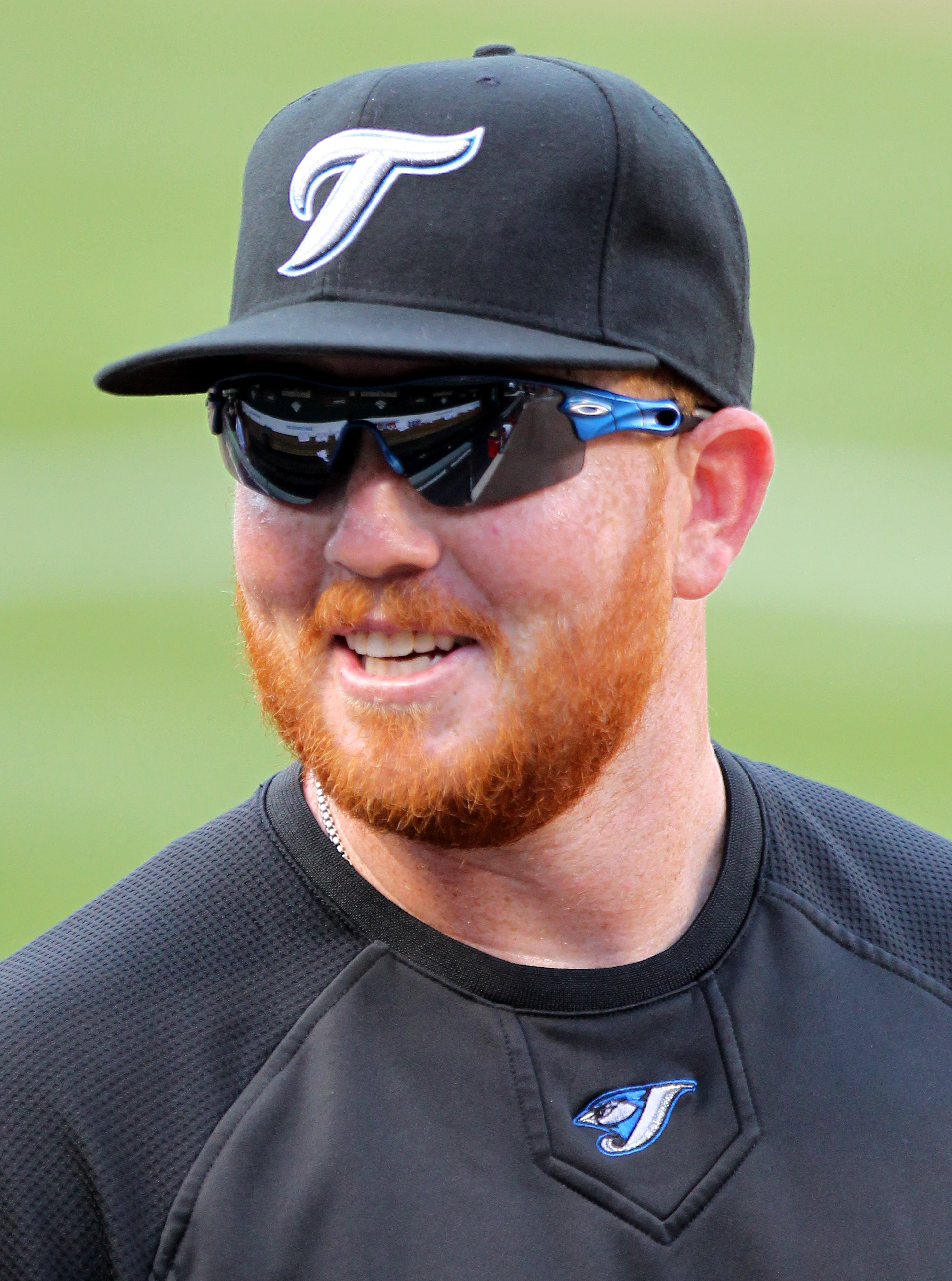
- Litsch with the Toronto Blue Jays in 2011
- Pitcher
- Born: March 9, 1985 (age 41); Pinellas Park, Florida, U.S.
- Batted: Right Threw: Right

MLB debut
- May 15, 2007, for the Toronto Blue Jays

Last MLB appearance
- September 25, 2011, for the Toronto Blue Jays

MLB statistics
- Win–loss record: 27–27
- Earned run average: 4.16
- Strikeouts: 239
- Stats at Baseball Reference

Teams
- Toronto Blue Jays (2007–2011)

Jesse Allen Litsch (born March 9, 1985) is an American former professional baseball pitcher. After working as a batboy for the Tampa Bay Devil Rays, he was drafted in the 24th round by the Toronto Blue Jays in 2004, and played from 2007 to 2011, when his career was cut short by injuries. In March 2016, Litsch became the pitching coach for the Bridgeport Bluefish of the Atlantic League of Professional Baseball.

== Professional career ==
=== 2007 ===
On May 15, 2007, Litsch made his Major League debut with the Blue Jays, filling in for the injured Roy Halladay. Over 8 2/3 innings (the most innings pitched by any Blue Jay in his debut), Litsch allowed only four hits, with two walks and one run while recording 21 of his 26 outs via groundouts. Litsch became the first Blue Jays pitcher to win his debut since Gustavo Chacín beat the New York Yankees on September 20, 2004. As a result of his performance, Litsch made three more starts with the Blue Jays. He was demoted to Double-A after posting a 0–3 record with a 19.62 ERA in those three starts.

After an injury to A. J. Burnett, the Blue Jays recalled Litsch and he started against Boston on July 15, 2007. He yielded one run on nine hits over 6 2/3 innings with two strikeouts and one walk, defeating Josh Beckett and the Boston Red Sox 2–1.

He came home to Tampa Bay on July 31, pitching 6 2/3 scoreless innings, giving up seven hits while walking one and striking out two. Litsch finished his first year in the majors 7–9 with a 3.89 ERA and 50 K/36 BB over 20 starts.

=== 2008–2010 ===
On May 24, 2008, the same day that Litsch pitched his first complete game and shutout, he also surpassed Jimmy Key's former franchise record by pitching 38 consecutive innings without walking a batter (Key's former mark was 34 1/3). In 2008, he threw cutters 43.4% of the time, the highest rate in the majors. Litsch finished the 2008 season with a record of 13–9, a 3.58 ERA, and 99 strikeouts.

On April 14, 2009, he was sent to the 15-day DL because of a right forearm strain. On June 9, it was announced Litsch would undergo season-ending Tommy John surgery. He made his first major league start since surgery on June 13, 2010 against the Colorado Rockies. Litsch struggled against the Rockies in his return from injury. He lasted only 2 1/3 innings and allowed seven runs on nine hits.

He regained his previous form in his next start against the San Francisco Giants on June 19 by going seven solid innings, allowing three hits in a 3-0 win.

=== 2011–retirement ===
Litsch was named the number 5 starter for the 2011 season. He made his 2011 debut on April 6 against the Oakland Athletics, getting the win and giving up six hits and three earned runs while striking out seven. He finished off the season with a 4.44 ERA and a 6-3 win–loss record over 75 innings pitched.

Litsch suffered a setback with his injured right shoulder early in 2012 training camp, and was shut down because of inflammation. He visited surgeon Dr. James Andrews for a full diagnosis that confirmed the inflammation and didn't find any structural damage. Litsch received a platelet-rich plasmas (PRP) injection to help with the healing process. The injection caused an unexpected serious infection, and Litsch was not allowed to throw for six weeks after undergoing emergency surgery. The infection sidelined him for the entire 2012 season.

On October 10, 2012, the Blue Jays announced Litsch was coming off the 60-day disabled list, but had chosen free agency over an assignment to their Triple-A affiliate Buffalo Bisons. In December 2012, it was reported Litsch was awaiting bone-graft and cartilage replacement surgery from a donor cadaver, and his career was in serious jeopardy. The surgery was performed on January 17, 2013, and Litsch was reported to be hopeful to pitch winter ball in late 2013.

On August 21, 2014, Litsch announced his retirement. He threw out the ceremonial first pitch of the Blue Jays-Rays game on September 2, 2014.

== Coaching ==
After retiring, Litsch coached middle and high school players at a Major League Baseball development center in China. In January 2016, he announced he would be the pitching coach for the Philippines national baseball team in their February World Baseball Classic qualifier. On March 1, 2016, the Bridgeport Bluefish hired Litsch to be their pitching coach for the 2016 season. For the 2022 season, Litsch was hired to manage the collegiate Williamsport Crosscutters in the MLB Draft League. On September 25, 2025, Litsch was hired to be the new head coach of the Macon Bacon for the upcoming 2026 season.

== Pitch repertoire ==
Litsch's main pitch was his four-seam fastball (87-93 mph), and could throw a two-seam fastball with considerable movement. He often used a cutter (85-89 mph) and a curveball (73-80 mph), and struggled with command of his changeup (79-82 mph).
