= 2009 Chicago White Sox season =

2009 Chicago White Sox
- League: American League
- Division: Central
- Ballpark: U.S. Cellular Field
- City: Chicago
- Record: 79–83 (.488)
- Divisional place: 3rd
- Owners: Jerry Reinsdorf
- General managers: Kenny Williams
- Managers: Ozzie Guillén
- Television: CSN Chicago; CSN+ WGN-TV and WGN America; WCIU-TV (Ken Harrelson, Steve Stone)
- Radio: WSCR (Ed Farmer, Darrin Jackson); WRTO (Spanish)

The 2009 Chicago White Sox season was the organization's 110th season in Chicago and 109th in the American League. The Sox entered the 2009 season as the defending American League Central Division champion, attempting to repeat against the Cleveland Indians, Detroit Tigers, Kansas City Royals and Minnesota Twins. The White Sox finished the season 79 wins and 83 losses with 3rd place in the American League Central, 7 1/2 games behind the American League Central champion Minnesota Twins, were officially eliminated from postseason contention for the first time since 2007, and failed to make the playoffs until the 2020 season.

On July 23 Mark Buehrle threw the eighteenth perfect game in Major League history, defeating the Tampa Bay Rays 5–0.

== Off-season ==
The Sox entered the off-season expecting to part ways with 3B Joe Crede, SS Orlando Cabrera, and CF Ken Griffey Jr. They were expected to move Rookie of the Year runner-up Alexei Ramírez to shortstop, leaving openings at second base, center field, and third base. There may also be opening in the starting rotation as José Contreras is not expected to be back until after the all-star break, as he recovers from a ruptured Achilles tendon.

- October 30, 2008 – Signed infielder Jayson Nix to a one-year deal. Declined 2009 options on catcher Toby Hall and Ken Griffey Jr.
- November 13, 2008 – Traded 1B/OF Nick Swisher and minor league pitcher Kanekoa Texeira to the New York Yankees for utility man Wilson Betemit and minor league pitchers Jeffrey Marquez and Jhonny Núñez.
- December 2, 2008 – Traded SP Javier Vázquez and RP Boone Logan to the Atlanta Braves for INF Brent Lillibridge, C Tyler Flowers, 3B Jon Gilmore, and RP Santos Rodriguez.
- December 5, 2008 – Signed pitcher John Van Benschoten to a minor league contract.
- December 12, 2008 – Signed 3B Dayán Viciedo to a four-year $10 million contract.
- January 14, 2009 – Signed SP Bartolo Colón to a one-year deal.

== Spring training ==
16–20–1

=== February ===
2–2

=== March ===
12–16–1

- Gavin Floyd re-signed with a 4-year contract worth $15.5 million on March 22.

=== April ===
2–2

== Regular season ==
The White Sox started out the season against the Kansas City Royals on April 7 and they ended the season against Detroit Tigers on October 4.

=== Season standings ===
AL Central
Team	W	L	Pct.	GB	Home	Road
Minnesota Twins	87	76	.534	—	49‍–‍33	38‍–‍43
Detroit Tigers	86	77	.528	1	51‍–‍30	35‍–‍47
Chicago White Sox	79	83	.488	7½	43‍–‍38	36‍–‍45
Cleveland Indians	65	97	.401	21½	35‍–‍46	30‍–‍51
Kansas City Royals	65	97	.401	21½	33‍–‍48	32‍–‍49

=== Record vs. opponents ===
2009 American League record Source: MLB Standings Grid – 2009
Team	BAL	BOS	CWS	CLE	DET	KC	LAA	MIN	NYY	OAK	SEA	TB	TEX	TOR	NL
Baltimore	–	2–16	5–4	2–5	3–5	4–4	2–8	3–2	5–13	1–5	4–5	8–10	5–5	9–9	11–7
Boston	16–2	–	4–4	7–2	6–1	5–3	4–5	4–2	9–9	5–5	2–4	9–9	2–7	11–7	11–7
Chicago	4–5	4−4	–	10–8	9–9	9–9	5–4	6−12	3–4	4–5	4–5	6–2	2–4	1–6	12–6
Cleveland	5–2	2–7	8–10	–	4–14	10–8	2–4	8–10	3–5	2–5	6–4	5–3	1–8	4–4	5–13
Detroit	5–3	1–6	9–9	14–4	–	9–9	5–4	7–12	1–5	5–4	5–4	5–2	7–2	3–5	10–8
Kansas City	4–4	3–5	9–9	8–10	9–9	–	1–9	6–12	2–4	2–6	5–4	1–9	3–3	4–3	8–10
Los Angeles	8–2	5–4	4–5	4–2	4–5	9–1	–	6–4	5–5	12–7	10–9	4–2	8–11	4–4	14–4
Minnesota	2–3	2–4	12–6	10–8	12–7	12–6	4–6	–	0–7	4–6	5–5	3–3	6–4	3–5	12–6
New York	13–5	9–9	4–3	5–3	5–1	4–2	5–5	7–0	–	7–2	6–4	11–7	5–4	12–6	10–8
Oakland	5–1	5–5	5–4	5–2	4–5	6–2	7–12	6–4	2–7	–	5–14	6–4	11–8	3–6	5–13
Seattle	5–4	4–2	5–4	4–6	4–5	4–5	9–10	5–5	4–6	14–5	–	5–3	8–11	3–4	11–7
Tampa Bay	10–8	9–9	2–6	3–5	2–5	9–1	2–4	3–3	7–11	4–6	3–5	–	3–6	14–4	13–5
Texas	5–5	7–2	4–2	8–1	2–7	3–3	11–8	4–6	4–5	8–11	11–8	6–3	–	5–5	9–9
Toronto	9–9	7–11	6–1	4–4	5–3	3–4	4–4	5–3	6–12	6–3	4–3	4–14	5–5	–	7–11

- Source: MLB Standings Grid – 2009

=== Opening Day starting lineup ===
- CF DeWayne Wise
- 2B Chris Getz
- LF Carlos Quentin
- DH Jim Thome
- RF Jermaine Dye
- 1B Paul Konerko
- C A. J. Pierzynski
- SS Alexei Ramírez
- 3B Josh Fields
- P Mark Buehrle

=== April ===
The White Sox started the season against the Royals on April 7 (originally scheduled for April 6 but postponed due to cold and snow), winning 4–2. On April 13 in Detroit, 3rd inning, Jermaine Dye hit his 300th career home run. The next batter, Paul Konerko, hit his 300th career home run. It is the first time in MLB history to have such a back-to-back milestone home runs, and the Sox wins it 10–6. On April 25 against the Toronto Blue Jays, Alexei Ramírez hit a grand slam as the Sox won 10–2. The White Sox finished April 11–10.

=== May ===
On May 7 against the Detroit Tigers, Mark Buehrle pitched a no-hitter through seventh inning before Plácido Polanco hit a line-drive double to left field; however the Sox shut out the Tigers 6–0. On May 11 against the Cleveland Indians in Progressive Field, Carlos Quentin hit a slump after suffering from plantar fasciitis which hampered his swing. He was forced to miss two games as a result of the injury. On May 15–18, Sox played with Toronto Blue Jays and Sox lost all four games in Toronto for two straight years and lost 10 straight games in Toronto since June 1, 2007. On May 21 against the Minnesota Twins, the Sox had a biggest loss 20–1 since May 10, 2002, when Sox lost to Anaheim Angels 19–0 in Los Angeles. On May 24 against the Pittsburgh Pirates, in the top of the ninth inning, Jack Wilson hit his first home run of season and tied the game at 3. The next batter Nyjer Morgan hit a double and then Delwyn Young singled and Morgan scored from second and Sox trailed it 4–3. In the bottom of the ninth inning, all batters that Matt Capps faced struck out swinging. The next day in Los Angeles against the Angels, the Sox scored 17 runs in one game, the most runs since the 2006 season. Also on that day, Carlos Quentin suffered his heel injury after he hit a double and he was placed on the 15-day disabled list. The last three games of that month, Sox swept the Royals in Kansas City. The White Sox finished May 13–15.

=== June ===
On June 1–4 against the Oakland Athletics, the Sox won the first game and lost last three, even though Oakland A's had one of the worst records in the American League, although that team is in a 7-game winning streak. On June 9 against the Detroit Tigers in the bottom of the ninth inning, bases loaded, trailing 6–4, Paul Konerko doubled down the left field line in which Scott Podsednik and Alexei Ramírez scored, but DeWayne Wise was called out at home plate even though replays showed that he looked safe since Wise's hand touched the home plate before he got tagged. The next batter, rookie Gordon Beckham struck out swinging with man on second to end the inning. In the top of the tenth inning, Miguel Cabrera hit a solo home run for a shameful loss 7–6. The Sox finished 12-game 11-day home stand with a bad record 4–8. On June 14 in Milwaukee against the Brewers, Mark Buehrle hit a solo home run in third inning. The Sox defeated the Brewers 5–4. On June 16, it was scheduled that Sox should have played with Cubs in Wrigley Field, but it was postponed due to rain, and the make-up date is announced to be September 3. On June 19 against the Reds in Cincinnati, the Sox had a first loss to Reds since 1999 and the Sox finished the record with Reds in this decade 11–1. The next day with Reds, after the third inning, Sox trailed it 5–0 and Sox came back and win it 10–8, which is the biggest come back so far this season. On June 24 against the Los Angeles Dodgers, Sox hit 6 home runs in one game, first time since June 8, 2004 against the Philadelphia Phillies. The homers are ones by Jermaine Dye, Paul Konerko, Jayson Nix, Alexei Ramírez, and two by Josh Fields. The Sox beat the Dodgers 10–7. In next day, the Sox defeated the Dodgers 6–5 for thirteen innings after Scott Podsednik hit a bases-loaded single and Beckham scored. The Sox took 2-out-of-3 in this series against the Dodgers, even though Dodgers had the best record of baseball. On June 27 against the Cubs, this game went back and forth. Finally, Gordon Beckham hit a walk-off RBI in the bottom of the ninth inning and Josh Fields scored to give Sox an 8–7 victory. The White Sox finished June 15–13.

=== July ===
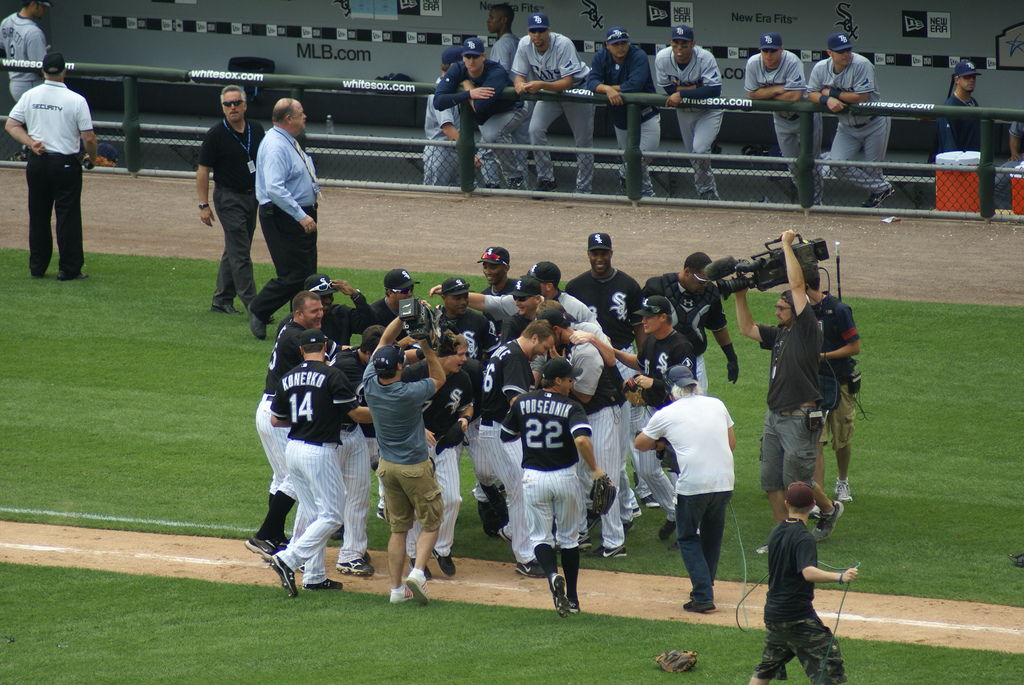
Teammates celebrated Mark Buehrle's perfect game on July 23, 2009.

On July 7 against the Cleveland Indians, Paul Konerko hit his first career three home runs in one game (one grand slam and two solo home runs), first time for White Sox player since José Valentín did on July 30, 2003, at Kansas City Royals. Typically the Sox took the victory 10–6. The starting pitcher Mark Buehrle (9–3 as of July 14) went to the All-Star Game on July 14 at Busch Stadium in St. Louis. On July 17 against the Baltimore Orioles, Jim Thome hit a grand slam and a three-run homer in a same game for his career high seven RBIs. On that day, the Sox beat the Orioles 12–8. On July 21 against the Tampa Bay Rays, Carlos Quentin was activated from a 15-day disabled list, which he went 1–4. On July 23, Mark Buehrle threw a perfect game against the Tampa Bay Rays and second career no-hitter. It is only the second perfect game in White Sox history, first since 1922. It is the 18th perfect game in MLB history, first time since Randy Johnson in 2004 for the Arizona Diamondbacks. On July 31, the day of the trade deadline the White Sox traded away Clayton Richard, Aaron Poreda, Adam Russell and Dexter Carter for former Cy Young Award winner Jake Peavy from the San Diego Padres. The White Sox finished July 14–13.

=== August ===
On August 10 the White Sox claimed Alex Ríos of the Toronto Blue Jays off waivers. Ríos is signed through 2014 for $69.35 million with a no-trade clause this year and a partial no-trade clause through the rest of his contract. On August 12 against the Seattle Mariners in Safeco Field, the score was 0–0 until Ken Griffey Jr. (former White Sox teammate) hit a walk-off single down the right field line in the fourteenth inning with men on first and second in which Adrián Beltré scored. On August 18, Freddy García picked up his first start for the White Sox since September 29, 2006. García get his loss to Kansas City Royals 5–4. On August 24 against the Boston Red Sox in third inning, José Contreras committed an error while trying to pick up a ball down the first baseline by David Ortiz to assist for a final out, which led to a season high six unearned runs and the Sox loses 12–8. On August 31 after the game, the Sox traded away Jim Thome to Los Angeles Dodgers for minor league infielder Justin Fuller and José Contreras to Colorado Rockies for minor league pitcher Brandon Hynick. The White Sox finished August 11–17.

=== September ===
On September 2 against the Minnesota Twins at the Metrodome, the Sox trailed 2–0 before Gordon Beckham and Paul Konerko hit back-to-back home runs with 2 outs in the ninth inning when both had 3–2 accounts off of Joe Nathan. Alexei Ramírez hit an RBI single and DeWayne Wise scores, and then Carlos Quentin scored on a wild pitch to Alex Ríos, which makes it 4–2 White Sox and a huge comeback victory to avoid sweep by Twins. On September 3, the interleague game against the Cubs at Wrigley Field was made-up from June 16. The Sox shutout the Cubs 5–0, finishing this year's interleague play 12–6 for Sox and 6–9 for Cubs, both are identical to last season's interleague play. The White Sox starting pitcher Carlos Torres picked up his first major league victory after he was debuted on July 22. On September 4, the White Sox got 20 hits against the Red Sox, the most hits in a game against that team since 1960. On September 5 against the Boston Red Sox, Gavin Floyd retired the first 17 hitters (broken up by Nick Green's single with 2 outs in the 6th inning) and a career-high 11 strikeouts for 8 innings pitched, which the Sox took the victory 5–1. On September 7, Mark Buehrle picked up his first win since the perfect game on July 23. On the next day against the Oakland Athletics, Carlos Torres pitched for just two-thirds of an inning as he allowed 5 runs on 4 hits with 2 homers. It is the shortest outing by a Sox starter in more than six years. Typically, Sox lost to Oakland 11–3. On September 12 at Los Angeles Angels, Scott Podsednik hit an inside-the-park home run, first time for the Sox since Joe Borchard hit that on September 9, 2002, at Kansas City Royals. Typically, Sox defeated the Angels 4–3 in ten innings. On September 17 against the Mariners in Safeco, with the score 3–1 Sox lead in the bottom of the ninth inning, Bobby Jenks allowed two home runs, one by José Lopez with nobody out and one by Bill Hall with two outs, which made it 3–3. In the bottom of the fourteenth inning, Ichiro Suzuki hit a walk-off single to center field with men on first and second in which Ryan Langerhans scored. On September 19, Jake Peavy got his first start for the White Sox since he started for San Diego Padres on June 8. Peavy picked up his first victory over the Royals 13–3. On September 21–23 against the Minnesota Twins, the Sox got swept at home for a first time since August 2007 when they were swept by Red Sox. On September 26 against the Detroit Tigers after 4th inning, Sox led 5–0, Tigers came back and defeated the White Sox 12–5. With that first loss at home on Saturday this season, the Sox finished the season's home games on Saturdays 11–1. The White Sox finished September 13–14.

=== October ===
The White Sox finished October 2–1 after winning two-out-of-three games in a series against the Detroit Tigers in Comerica Park.

=== Roster ===
2009 Chicago White Sox
Roster
Pitchers: 41 Lance Broadway; 56 Mark Buehrle; 53 D. J. Carrasco; 40 Bartolo Colón; 52 José Contreras; 50 John Danks; 26 Octavio Dotel; 62 Jack Egbert; 34 Gavin Floyd; 43 Freddy García; 39 Jimmy Gobble; 54 Daniel Hudson; 45 Bobby Jenks; 47 Mike MacDougal; 65 Jhonny Núñez; 44 Jake Peavy; 57 Tony Peña; 49 Aaron Poreda; 54 Clayton Richard; 37 Matt Thornton; 60 Carlos Torres; 47 Wes Whisler; 67 Randy Williams	Catchers: 27 Ramón Castro; 39 Tyler Flowers; 44 Corky Miller; 12 A. J. Pierzynski; Infielders: 15 Gordon Beckham; 15 Wilson Betemit; 7,22 Josh Fields; 17 Chris Getz; 14 Paul Konerko; 30 Mark Kotsay; 18 Brent Lillibridge; 5 Jayson Nix; 10 Alexei Ramírez; Outfielders: 32 Brian Anderson; 23 Jermaine Dye; 7 Jerry Owens; 1,22 Scott Podsednik; 20 Carlos Quentin; 51 Alex Ríos; 31 DeWayne Wise; Designated Hitters: 25 Jim Thome	Manager: 13 Ozzie Guillén; Coaches: 3 Harold Baines (first base); 21 Don Cooper (pitching); 28 Joey Cora (bench); 8 Jeff Cox (third base); 36 Juan Nieves (bullpen); 29 Greg Walker (hitting)

=== Game log ===
2009 White Sox game log

April (11–10)–Home (6–6)–Road (5–4)
#	Date	Opponent	Score	Win	Loss	Save	Time	Att.	Record	Box
--	April 6	Royals	Postponed (cold weather) Rescheduled for April 7							
1	April 7	Royals	4–2	Dotel (1–0)	Farnsworth (0–1)	Jenks (1)	2:32	37,449	1–0	box
2	April 8	Royals	0–2	Greinke (1–0)	Floyd (0–1)	Soria (1)	2:24	22,817	1–1	box
3	April 9	Royals	1–2	Mahay (1–0)	Jenks (0–1)	Soria (2)	2:51	18,091	1–2	box
4	April 10	Twins	5–12	Dickey (1–0)	Contreras (0–1)		2:59	25,422	1–3	box
5	April 11	Twins	8–0	Colón (1–0)	Liriano (0–2)		2:55	33,935	2–3	box
6	April 12	Twins	6–1	Buehrle (1–0)	Blackburn (0–1)	Jenks (2)	2:30	25,571	3–3	box
7	April 13	@ Tigers	10–6	Floyd (1–1)	Miner (1–1)		3:20	21,850	4–3	box
--	April 14	@ Tigers	Postponed (rain), rescheduled for July 24							
8	April 15	@ Tigers	0–9	Galarraga (2–0)	Contreras (0–2)		3:03	20,212	4–4	box
9	April 16	@ Rays	3–2	Danks (1–0)	Niemann (0–2)	Jenks (3)	3:11	13,803	5–4	box
10	April 17	@ Rays	5–6	Shields (2–1)	Thornton (0–1)	Percival (2)	2:45	28,927	5–5	box
11	April 18	@ Rays	8–3	Buehrle (2–0)	Kazmir (2–1)		2:54	31,916	6–5	box
12	April 19	@ Rays	12–2	Floyd (2–1)	Garza (1–1)		2:54	29,142	7–5	box
13	April 21	@ Orioles	3–10	Bergesen (1–0)	Contreras (0–3)		2:41	14,801	7–6	box
14	April 22	@ Orioles	8–2	Danks (2–0)	Guthrie (2–1)		2:48	10,868	8–6	box
15	April 23	@ Orioles	2–6	Eaton (1–2)	Colón (1–1)		2:31	11,723	8–7	box
16	April 24	Blue Jays	0–14	Tallet (1–0)	Floyd (2–2)		3:19	27,103	8–8	box
17	April 25	Blue Jays	10–2	Buehrle (3–0)	Burres (0–1)		2:38	30,383	9–8	box
18	April 26	Blue Jays	3–4	Halladay (4–1)	Linebrink (0–1)	Downs (2)	2:39	31,459	9–9	box
--	April 27	Mariners	Postponed (rain) Rescheduled for April 28							
19	April 28	Mariners	2–1	Colón (2–1)	Jakubauskas (1–3)	Jenks (4)	1:52	N/A	10–9	box
20	April 28	Mariners	1–9	Hernández (4–0)	Danks (2–1)		2:32	25,042	10–10	box
21	April 29	Mariners	6–3	Thornton (1–1)	Kelley (0–1)	Jenks (5)	3:10	18,023	11–10	box

May (13–15)–Home (6–4)–Road (7–11)
#	Date	Opponent	Score	Win	Loss	Save	Time	Att.	Record	Box
22	May 1	@ Rangers	4–3	Buehrle (4–0)	Holland (0–1)	Jenks (6)	2:28	23,836	12–10	box
23	May 2	@ Rangers	6–9	McCarthy (3–0)	Contreras (0–4)	Francisco (7)	2:37	26,673	12–11	box
24	May 3	@ Rangers	1–5	Harrison (2–2)	Danks (2–2)		2:53	20,132	12–12	box
25	May 4	@ Royals	0–3	Greinke (6–0)	Colón (2–2)		2:19	21,843	12–13	box
26	May 5	@ Royals	7–8 (11)	Cruz (2–0)	Broadway (0–1)		4:33	13,419	12–14	box
--	May 6	Tigers	Postponed (rain), rescheduled for June 8							
27	May 7	Tigers	6–0	Buehrle (5–0)	Galarraga (3–2)		2:02	27,475	13–14	box
28	May 8	Rangers	0–6	Harrison (3–2)	Contreras (0–5)		2:28	21,326	13–15	box
29	May 9	Rangers	3–2	Linebrink (1–1)	Millwood (3–3)	Jenks (7)	2:48	28,864	14–15	box
30	May 10	Rangers	1–7	Padilla (2–2)	Colón (2–3)		2:29	25,844	14–16	box
31	May 11	@ Indians	4–9	Pavano (3–3)	Floyd (2–3)		2:53	14,567	14–17	box
32	May 12	@ Indians	7–4	Carrasco (1–0)	Sowers (0–2)	Jenks (8)	3:19	16,760	15–17	box
33	May 13	@ Indians	0–4	Lee (2–5)	Buehrle (5–1)		2:23	23,884	15–18	box
34	May 15	@ Blue Jays	3–8	Cecil (2–0)	Danks (2–3)		2:23	17,241	15–19	box
35	May 16	@ Blue Jays	1–2	Ray (1–1)	Linebrink (1–2)	Downs (4)	2:26	21,759	15–20	box
36	May 17	@ Blue Jays	2–8	Halladay (8–1)	Floyd (2–4)		2:28	37,147	15–21	box
37	May 18	@ Blue Jays	2–3	Carlson (1–2)	Dotel (1–1)	Downs (5)	2:18	24,206	15–22	box
38	May 19	Twins	6–2	Buehrle (6–1)	Baker (1–5)		2:40	26,696	16–22	box
39	May 20	Twins	7–4	Danks (3–3)	Liriano (2–5)	Jenks (9)	2:46	29,044	17–22	box
40	May 21	Twins	1–20	Blackburn (3–2)	Colón (2–4)		2:58	23,048	17–23	box
41	May 22	Pirates	2–0	Floyd (3–4)	Duke (5–4)	Jenks (10)	1:51	23,347	18–23	box
42	May 23	Pirates	4–0	Richard (1–0)	Ohlendorf (5–4)		2:34	32,389	19–23	box
43	May 24	Pirates	3–4	Grabow (3–0)	Jenks (0–2)	Capps (9)	2:29	28,309	19–24	box
44	May 25	@ Angels	17–3	Danks (4–3)	Santana (0–2)		3:04	43,177	20–24	box
45	May 26	@ Angels	4–2	Colón (3–4)	Saunders (6–3)	Linebrink (1)	2:48	38,040	21–24	box
46	May 27	@ Angels	1–3	Weaver (4–2)	Floyd (3–5)	Fuentes (13)	2:05	40,169	21–25	box
47	May 29	@ Royals	11–2	Richard (2–0)	Bannister (4–2)		2:39	26,495	22–25	box
48	May 30	@ Royals	5–3	Linebrink (2–2)	Cruz (3–1)	Jenks (11)	2:29	37,894	23–25	box
49	May 31	@ Royals	7–4	Thornton (2–1)	Bale (0–1)	Jenks (12)	3:13	19,855	24–25	box

June (15–13)–Home (8–10)–Road (7–3)
#	Date	Opponent	Score	Win	Loss	Save	Time	Att.	Record	Box
50	June 1	Athletics	6–2	Thornton (3–1)	Breslow (1–4)		2:46	26,038	25–25	box
51	June 2	Athletics	0–5	Mazzaro (1–0)	Colón (3–5)		2:33	20,519	25–26	box
52	June 3	Athletics	3–5	Outman (3–0)	Richard (2–1)	Bailey (3)	2:33	23,207	25–27	box
53	June 4	Athletics	0–7	Anderson (3–5)	Buehrle (6–2)		2:15	18,219	25–28	box
54	June 5	Indians	0–6	Pavano (6–4)	Danks (4–4)		2:24	29,825	25–29	box
55	June 6	Indians	4–2	Floyd (4–5)	Sowers (1–3)	Jenks (13)	2:36	30,307	26–29	box
56	June 7	Indians	4–8	Huff (1–2)	Colón (3–6)		3:11	25,609	26–30	box
57	June 8	Tigers	4–5	Zumaya (3–0)	Linebrink (2–3)	Rodney (11)	3:01	24,408	26–31	box
58	June 8	Tigers	6–1	Contreras (1–5)	Bonderman (0–1)		2:18	30,809	27–31	box
59	June 9	Tigers	6–7 (10)	Lyon (2–3)	Linebrink (2–4)		3:36	25,676	27–32	box
60	June 10	Tigers	1–2	Verlander (7–2)	Danks (4–5)		2:12	28,079	27–33	box
61	June 11	Tigers	4–3	Jenks (1–2)	Zumaya (3–1)		2:37	20,824	28–33	box
62	June 12	@ Brewers	2–7	Suppan (5–4)	Dotel (1–2)		2:51	41,811	28–34	box
63	June 13	@ Brewers	7–1	Contreras (2–5)	Parra (3–8)		2:44	44,100	29–34	box
64	June 14	@ Brewers	5–4	Thornton (4–1)	Hoffman (0–1)	Jenks (14)	2:46	41,586	30–34	box
--	June 16	@ Cubs	Postponed (rain) Rescheduled for September 3							
65	June 17	@ Cubs	4–1	Danks (5–5)	Dempster (4–4)	Jenks (15)	2:41	40,444	31–34	box
66	June 18	@ Cubs	5–6	Gregg (1–1)	Thornton (4–2)		2:35	40,467	31–35	box
67	June 19	@ Reds	3–4	Arroyo (8–5)	Contreras (2–6)	Cordero (17)	2:50	28,395	31–36	box
68*	June 20	@ Reds	10–8	Carrasco (2–0)	Herrera (1–3)	Jenks (16)	3:39	42,234	32–36	box
69	June 21	@ Reds	4–1	Buehrle (7–2)	Harang (5–7)	Jenks (17)	2:43	32,786	33–36	box
70	June 23	Dodgers	2–5	Kuroda (2–3)	Danks (5–6)	Broxton (18)	2:28	22,251	33–37	box
71	June 24	Dodgers	10–7	Floyd (5–5)	Wolf (3–3)	Jenks (18)	3:13	20,142	34–37	box
72	June 25	Dodgers	6–5 (13)	Poreda (1–0)	Weaver (4–2)		4:27	20,051	35–37	box
73	June 26	Cubs	4–5	Wells (2–3)	Contreras (2–7)	Gregg (12)	2:26	39,015	35–38	box
74	June 27	Cubs	8–7	Jenks (2–2)	Marshall (3–6)		3:31	39,529	36–38	box
75	June 28	Cubs	6–0	Danks (6–6)	Zambrano (4–3)		2:50	39,745	37–38	box
76	June 29	@ Indians	6–3	Floyd (6–5)	Pavano (6–7)		2:41	15,645	38–38	box
77	June 30	@ Indians	11–4 (7)	Richard (3–1)	Lee (4–7)		1:56	14,793	39–38	box
*Civil Rights Game

July (14–13)–Home (9–3)–Road (5–10)
#	Date	Opponent	Score	Win	Loss	Save	Time	Att.	Record	Box
78	July 1	@ Indians	6–2	Contreras (3–7)	Sowers (2–6)		2:39	16,722	40–38	box
79	July 2	@ Royals	4–1	Buehrle (8–2)	Chen (0–2)	Jenks (19)	2:25	17,964	41–38	box
80	July 3	@ Royals	5–0	Danks (7–6)	Greinke (10–4)	Linebrink (2)	2:25	39,026	42–38	box
81	July 4	@ Royals	4–6	Hochevar (4–3)	Floyd (6–6)	Soria (11)	2:42	18,182	42–39	box
82	July 5	@ Royals	3–6	Bannister (6–6)	Richard (3–2)	Soria (12)	2:49	15,915	42–40	box
83	July 7	Indians	10–6	Buehrle (9–2)	Sowers (2–7)		2:46	23,758	43–40	box
84	July 8	Indians	5–1	Contreras (4–7)	Laffey (3–2)		2:22	26,772	44–40	box
85	July 9	Indians	8–10	Sipp (1–0)	Richard (3–3)	Wood (11)	3:43	27,257	44–41	box
86	July 10	@ Twins	4–6	Blackburn (8–4)	Dotel (1–3)	Nathan (23)	2:40	29,628	44–42	box
87	July 11	@ Twins	8–7	Floyd (7–6)	Perkins (4–5)	Jenks (20)	3:07	41,146	45–42	box
88	July 12	@ Twins	7–13	Baker (7–7)	Buehrle (9–3)		2:47	36,254	45–43	box
All-Star Break: AL defeats NL 4–3 at Busch Stadium
89	July 17	Orioles	12–8	Danks (8–6)	Berken (1–7)		3:19	32,013	46–43	box
90	July 18	Orioles	4–3	Buehrle (10–3)	Bergesen (6–4)	Jenks (21)	2:26	32,881	47–43	box
91	July 19	Orioles	2–10	Guthrie (7–8)	Contreras (4–8)		2:53	32,069	47–44	box
92	July 20	Rays	4–3	Floyd (8–6)	Price (3–4)	Jenks (22)	2:53	39,024	48–44	box
93	July 21	Rays	2–3	Niemann (9–4)	Jenks (2–3)	Howell (10)	2:31	23,319	48–45	box
94	July 22	Rays	4–3	Carrasco (3–0)	Wheeler (3–3)	Thornton (1)	2:46	26,257	49–45	box
95	July 23	Rays	5–0	Buehrle (11–3)	Kazmir (4–6)		2:03	28,036	50–45	box
96	July 24	@ Tigers	1–5	Verlander (11–5)	Contreras (4–9)		2:35	27,844	50–46	box
97	July 24	@ Tigers	3–4	Lyon (4–4)	Linebrink (2–5)	Rodney (21)	2:31	39,375	50–47	box
98	July 25	@ Tigers	3–4 (10)	Rodney (1–2)	Carrasco (3–1)		3:14	41,378	50–48	box
99	July 26	@ Tigers	5–1	Richard (4–3)	Porcello (9–7)		2:33	38,255	51–48	box
100	July 27	@ Twins	3–4	Perkins (6–6)	Danks (8–7)	Nathan (27)	2:15	32,354	51–49	box
101	July 28	@ Twins	3–5	Mijares (1–2)	Buehrle (11–4)	Nathan (28)	2:44	34,642	51–50	box
102	July 29	@ Twins	2–3	Crain (3–4)	Contreras (4–10)	Nathan (29)	2:34	39,002	51–51	box
103	July 30	Yankees	3–2	Thornton (5–2)	Hughes (4–3)		2:35	31,305	52–51	box
104	July 31	Yankees	10–5	Peña (6–3)	Robertson (1–1)		3:11	38,228	53–51	box

August (11–17)–Home (7–7)–Road (4–10)
#	Date	Opponent	Score	Win	Loss	Save	Time	Att.	Record	Box
105	August 1	Yankees	14–4	Danks (9–7)	Burnett (10–5)		3:25	38,763	54–51	box
106	August 2	Yankees	5–8	Sabathia (11–7)	Buehrle (11–5)	Rivera (30)	3:10	36,325	54–52	box
107	August 4	Angels	5–4	Thornton (6–2)	Jepsen (3–3)		2:48	30,228	55–52	box
108	August 5	Angels	6–2	Floyd (9–6)	O'Sullivan (3–1)		2:35	32,167	56–52	box
109	August 6	Angels	5–9	Santana (4–6)	Danks (9–8)		2:59	27,487	56–53	box
110	August 7	Indians	2–6	Sowers (4–7)	Buehrle (11–6)		2:44	27,153	56–54	box
111	August 8	Indians	8–5	Carrasco (4–1)	Todd (0–1)		3:15	35,224	57–54	box
112	August 9	Indians	4–8	Huff (6–6)	Contreras (4–11)		2:52	34,063	57–55	box
113	August 10	@ Mariners	4–6	White (3–2)	Floyd (9–7)	Aardsma (27)	2:42	21,049	57–56	box
114	August 11	@ Mariners	3–1	Danks (10–8)	Aardsma (3–4)	Jenks (23)	2:24	19,385	58–56	box
115	August 12	@ Mariners	0–1 (14)	Jakubauskas (6–7)	Peña (6–4)		3:52	24,427	58–57	box
116	August 14	@ Athletics	8–7 (10)	Dotel (2–3)	Breslow (5–6)	Jenks (24)	3:02	20,348	59–57	box
117	August 15	@ Athletics	8–1	Floyd (10–7)	Gonzalez (4–3)		2:46	17,742	60–57	box
118	August 16	@ Athletics	2–3	Bailey (5–3)	Jenks (2–4)		2:30	20,241	60–58	box
119	August 17	Royals	8–7	Linebrink (3–5)	Colón (1–3)	Jenks (25)	2:36	36,703	61–58	box
120	August 18	Royals	4–5	Meche (6–9)	García (0–1)	Soria (20)	3:15	28,812	61–59	box
121	August 19	Royals	4–2	Contreras (5–11)	Greinke (11–8)	Jenks (26)	2:16	25,786	62–59	box
122	August 21	Orioles	1–5	Guthrie (8–12)	Floyd (10–8)		2:23	34,125	62–60	box
123	August 22	Orioles	4–1	Danks (11–8)	Hernandez (4–6)	Jenks (27)	2:46	34,730	63–60	box
124	August 23	Orioles	4–5	Berken (3–11)	Buehrle (11–7)	Johnson (6)	2:51	32,742	63–61	box
125	August 24	@ Red Sox	8–12	Ramírez (7–3)	Contreras (5–12)		3:42	37,812	63–62	box
126	August 25	@ Red Sox	3–6	Delcarmen (5–2)	Linebrink (3–6)	Papelbon (30)	3:05	38,059	63–63	box
127	August 26	@ Red Sox	2–3	Bard (1–1)	Peña (1–2)		2:29	37,839	63–64	box
128	August 27	@ Red Sox	9–5	Danks (12–8)	Tazawa (2–3)		3:04	38,003	64–64	box
129	August 28	@ Yankees	2–5	Bruney (4–0)	Williams (0–1)		3:15	46,318	64–65	box
130	August 29	@ Yankees	0–10	Mitre (3–1)	Contreras (5–13)		2:39	46,193	64–66	box
131	August 30	@ Yankees	3–8	Aceves (9–1)	García (0–2)		2:49	46,664	64–67	box
132	August 31	@ Twins	1–4	Blackburn (9–9)	Floyd (10–9)	Nathan (35)	2:39	19,426	64–68	box

September/October (15–15)–Home (7–8)–Road (8–7)
#	Date	Opponent	Score	Win	Loss	Save	Time	Att.	Record	Box
133	September 1	@ Twins	3–4	Rauch (4–2)	Thornton (6–3)		2:45	22,599	64–69	box
134	September 2	@ Twins	4–2	Carrasco (5–1)	Nathan (2–2)	Jenks (28)	2:32	21,007	65–69	box
135	September 3	@ Cubs	5–0	Torres (1–0)	Dempster (8–8)		2:32	40,741	66–69	box
136	September 4	Red Sox	12–2	García (1–2)	Byrd (1–1)		2:58	28,839	67–69	box
137	September 5	Red Sox	5–1	Floyd (11–9)	Wakefield (11–4)		2:14	33,239	68–69	box
138	September 6	Red Sox	1–6	Lester (12–7)	Danks (12–9)		3:02	32,134	68–70	box
139	September 7	Red Sox	5–1	Buehrle (12–7)	Beckett (14–6)		2:25	22,511	69–70	box
140	September 8	Athletics	3–11	Tomko (4–3)	Torres (1–1)		2:45	24,317	69–71	box
141	September 9	Athletics	4–3 (13)	Dotel (3–3)	González (0–2)		3:50	23,703	70–71	box
142	September 11	@ Angels	1–7	Saunders (13–7)	Floyd (11–10)		2:32	38,375	70–72	box
143	September 12	@ Angels	4–3 (10)	Jenks (3–4)	Fuentes (1–4)	Peña (1)	3:29	37,390	71–72	box
144	September 13	@ Angels	2–3	Oliver (5–1)	Buehrle (12–8)	Fuentes (41)	2:27	37,512	71–73	box
145	September 15	@ Mariners	6–3	García (2–2)	Kelley (4–3)	Jenks (29)	2:59	17,153	72–73	box
146	September 16	@ Mariners	1–4	Rowland-Smith (4–3)	Floyd (11–11)	Aardsma (35)	2:11	16,596	72–74	box
147	September 17	@ Mariners	3–4 (14)	Kelley (5–3)	Linebrink (3–7)		3:59	16,336	72–75	box
148	September 18	Royals	0–11	Hochevar (7–10)	Buehrle (12–9)		2:29	29,179	72–76	box
149	September 19	Royals	13–3	Peavy (1–0)	Hughes (0–1)		2:44	28,329	73–76	box
150	September 20	Royals	1–2	Tejeda (4–1)	García (2–3)	Soria (26)	2:40	22,798	73–77	box
151	September 21	Twins	0–7	Blackburn (11–11)	Hudson (0–1)		2:42	26,541	73–78	box
152	September 22	Twins	6–8	Crain (7–4)	Danks (12–10)	Nathan (43)	2:40	25,290	73–79	box
153	September 23	Twins	6–8	Duensing (5–1)	Buehrle (12–10)	Nathan (44)	3:10	26,097	73–80	box
154	September 25	Tigers	2–0	Peavy (2–0)	Bonine (0–1)	Thornton (2)	2:26	30,794	74–80	box
155	September 26	Tigers	5–12	Figaro (2–1)	García (2–4)		2:50	35,590	74–81	box
156	September 27	Tigers	8–4	Hudson (1–1)	Jackson (13–8)	Thornton (3)	2:38	33,685	75–81	box
157	September 28	@ Indians	6–1	Danks (13–10)	Laffey (7–8)		2:22	23,088	76–81	box
--	September 29	@ Indians	Postponed (rain), rescheduled for September 30							
158	September 30	@ Indians	1–5	Carmona (5–12)	Torres (1–2)		2:17	N/A	76–82	box
159	September 30	@ Indians	1–0	Buehrle (13–10)	Masterson (4–10)	Thornton (4)	2:02	16,871	77–82	box
160	October 2	@ Tigers	8–0	Peavy (3–0)	Jackson (13–9)		2:24	34,726	78–82	box
161	October 3	@ Tigers	5–1	García (3–4)	Figaro (2–2)		2:49	35,184	79–82	box
162	October 4	@ Tigers	3–5	Verlander (19–9)	Danks (13–11)	Rodney (37)	2:26	35,806	79–83	box

== Player stats ==
=== Batting ===
Note: G = Games played; AB = At bats; R = Runs scored; H = Hits; 2B = Doubles; 3B = Triples; HR = Home runs; RBI = Runs batted in; AVG = Batting average; SB = Stolen bases

Player	G	AB	R	H	2B	3B	HR	RBI	AVG	SB
Brian Anderson, CF	65	185	25	44	9	0	2	13	.238	3
Gordon Beckham, 3B	103	378	58	102	28	1	14	63	.270	7
Wilson Betemit, 3B	20	45	2	9	5	0	0	3	.200	0
Mark Buehrle, P	2	4	1	1	0	0	1	1	.250	0
D. J. Carrasco, P	2	0	0	0	0	0	0	0	—	0
Ramón Castro, C	31	76	8	14	3	0	4	12	.184	0
José Contreras, P	2	6	0	0	0	0	0	0	.000	0
John Danks, P	1	2	0	0	0	0	0	0	.000	0
Octavio Dotel, P	4	0	0	0	0	0	0	0	—	0
Jermaine Dye, RF	141	503	78	126	19	1	27	81	.250	0
Josh Fields, 3B	79	239	29	53	5	2	7	30	.222	2
Tyler Flowers, C	10	16	3	3	1	0	0	0	.188	0
Gavin Floyd, P	1	1	0	0	0	0	0	0	.000	0
Chris Getz, 2B	107	375	49	98	18	4	2	31	.261	25
Jimmy Gobble, P	1	0	0	0	0	0	0	0	—	0
Bobby Jenks, P	4	0	0	0	0	0	0	0	—	0
Paul Konerko, 1B	152	546	75	151	30	1	28	88	.277	1
Mark Kotsay, 1B	67	187	16	52	9	0	4	23	.278	3
Brent Lillibridge, 2B	46	95	9	15	2	0	0	3	.158	6
Scott Linebrink, P	5	0	0	0	0	0	0	0	—	0
Corky Miller, C	14	39	5	8	3	0	0	5	.205	0
Jayson Nix, 2B	94	255	36	57	11	0	12	32	.224	10
Jerry Owens, LF	12	12	0	1	0	0	0	0	.083	1
A. J. Pierzynski, C	138	504	57	151	22	1	13	49	.300	1
Scott Podsednik, CF	132	537	75	163	25	6	7	48	.304	30
Aaron Poreda, P	2	0	0	0	0	0	0	0	—	0
Carlos Quentin, LF	99	351	47	83	14	0	21	56	.236	3
Alexei Ramírez, SS	148	542	71	150	14	1	15	68	.277	14
Clayton Richard, P	3	3	1	1	1	0	0	0	.333	0
Alex Ríos, CF	41	146	11	29	6	0	3	9	.199	5
Jim Thome, DH	107	345	55	86	15	0	23	74	.249	0
Matt Thornton, P	4	0	0	0	0	0	0	0	—	0
Carlos Torres, P	1	3	0	0	0	0	0	0	.000	0
DeWayne Wise, RF	84	142	17	32	8	3	2	11	.225	4
Team totals	162	5537	724	1429	248	20	184	700	.258	115

=== Pitching ===
Note: W = Wins; L = Losses; ERA = Earned run average; G = Games pitched; GS = Games started; SV = Saves; IP = Innings pitched; H = Hits allowed; R = Runs allowed; ER = Earned runs allowed; BB = Walks allowed; K = Strikeouts; BAA = Batting average against

Player	W	L	ERA	G	GS	SV	IP	H	R	ER	BB	K	BAA
Lance Broadway	0	1	5.06	8	0	0	16.0	19	10	9	9	9	.288
Mark Buehrle	13	10	3.84	33	33	0	213.1	222	97	91	45	105	.275
D. J. Carrasco	5	1	3.76	49	1	0	93.1	103	42	39	29	62	.281
Bartolo Colón	3	6	4.19	12	12	0	62.1	69	42	29	21	38	.280
José Contreras	5	13	5.42	21	21	0	114.2	121	83	69	45	89	.267
John Danks	13	11	3.77	32	32	0	200.1	184	89	84	73	149	.245
Octavio Dotel	3	3	3.32	62	0	0	62.1	54	26	23	36	75	.239
Jack Egbert	0	0	27.00	2	0	0	2.2	8	8	8	2	0	.533
Gavin Floyd	11	11	4.06	30	30	0	193.0	178	93	87	59	163	.244
Freddy García	3	4	4.34	9	9	0	56.0	56	27	27	12	37	.259
Jimmy Gobble	0	0	7.50	12	0	0	12.0	14	10	10	7	10	.280
Daniel Hudson	1	1	3.38	12	6	0	18.2	16	9	7	9	14	.225
Bobby Jenks	3	4	3.71	52	0	29	53.1	52	24	22	16	49	.250
Scott Linebrink	3	7	4.66	57	0	2	56.0	70	34	29	23	55	.304
Mike MacDougal	0	0	12.46	5	0	0	4.1	7	6	6	7	3	.389
Jhonny Núñez	0	0	9.53	7	0	0	5.2	10	6	6	2	3	.370
Jake Peavy	3	0	1.35	3	3	0	20.0	11	3	3	6	18	.162
Tony Peña	1	2	3.75	35	0	1	36.0	40	17	15	9	29	.272
Aaron Poreda	1	0	2.45	10	0	0	11.0	9	3	3	8	12	.231
Clayton Richard	4	3	4.65	26	14	0	89.0	94	50	46	37	66	.276
Matt Thornton	6	3	2.74	70	0	4	72.1	58	22	22	20	87	.217
Carlos Torres	1	2	6.04	8	5	0	28.1	30	20	19	17	22	.286
Wes Whisler	0	0	13.50	3	0	0	1.1	0	2	2	3	2	.000
Randy Williams	0	1	4.58	25	0	0	17.2	13	9	9	12	22	.206
Team totals	79	83	4.16	162	162	36	1439.2	1438	732	665	507	1119	.261

== Team scoring and season summary ==
- Games played: 162
- Record: 79–83
- Rank: 3rd
- Games behind: 7.5
- Biggest lead: 0.5 games (last on May 1)
- Farthest behind: 9.5 games (last on September 26)
- Most games over .500: 5 (last on July 23)
- Most games under .500: 7 (last on September 26)
- Longest winning streak: 7 games (June 27 to July 3)
- Longest losing streak: 5 games (May 13 to 18 and August 28 to September 1)
- Series sweep: 2–5
- Longest game: 14 innings (August 12 at Mariners and September 17 at Mariners)
- Shortest game: 7 innings (June 30 at Indians)
- Home record: 43–38
- Road record: 36–45
- vs. East division teams: 18–21
- vs. Central division teams: 34–38
- vs. West division teams: 15–18
- vs. American League teams: 67–77
- vs. National League teams: 12–6
- Runs scored: 724
- Runs allowed: 732
- Pythagorean record: 80–82
- Runs scored per game: 4.47
- Runs allowed per game: 4.52
- Blowout games: 23–25
- One-run games: 19–27
- 9-inning games: 74–77
- Extra-inning games: 4–6
- Shortened games: 1–0
- Walk-off games: 6–9
- Shutouts: 11–13
- 10+ runs scored: 14
- 10+ runs allowed: 12
- Most runs scored: 17 (May 25 at Angels)
- Most runs allowed: 20 (May 21 vs Twins)

== Farm system ==
Level	Team	League	Manager
AAA	Charlotte Knights	International League	Chris Chambliss
AA	Birmingham Barons	Southern League	Ever Magallanes
A	Winston-Salem Dash	Carolina League	Joe McEwing
A	Kannapolis Intimidators	South Atlantic League	Ernie Young
Rookie	Bristol White Sox	Appalachian League	Ryan Newman
Rookie	Great Falls Voyagers	Pioneer League	Chris Cron
