= Jack Egbert =

American baseball player (born 1983)

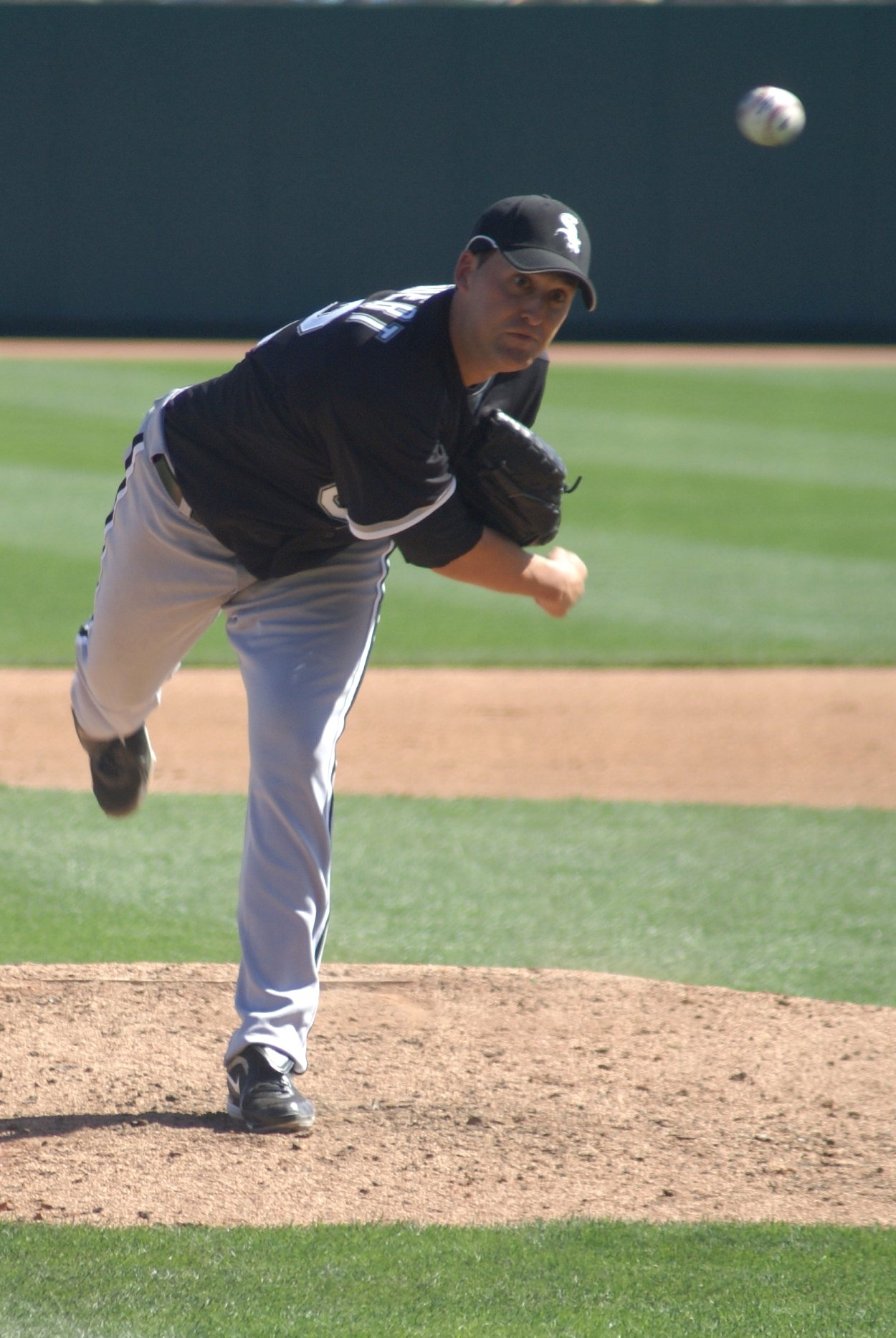
- Egbert with the Chicago White Sox
- Pitcher
- Born: May 12, 1983 (age 43); Staten Island, New York, U.S.
- Batted: Left Threw: Right

MLB debut
- April 21, 2009, for the Chicago White Sox

Last appearance
- May 28, 2012, for the New York Mets

MLB statistics
- Win–loss record: 0–0
- Earned run average: 21.60
- Strikeouts: 0
- Stats at Baseball Reference

Teams
- Chicago White Sox (2009); New York Mets (2012)

Jack Egbert (born May 12, 1983) is an American former professional baseball pitcher, who played in Major League Baseball (MLB) for the Chicago White Sox and New York Mets.

== Career ==
=== College ===
A graduate of Rutgers University, in which he was a starting pitcher for them and a two time all Big East performer, he was drafted by the Chicago White Sox in the 13th round of the 2004 MLB draft.

=== Chicago White Sox ===
Egbert began his professional career for the Rookie League Great Falls White Sox in 2004. In 17 games, in which he started nine, he had a 3.37 ERA with a 4–1 record.

In 2005, Egbert played for the Single-A Kannapolis Intimidators. He made 24 starts in 30 games and went 10–5 with a 3.12 ERA. Egbert pitched 6 shutout innings to clinch the Intimidators only title in franchise history and was named Pitcher of the Year. His 4 complete games were second in the South Atlantic League and he led the league with three shutouts.

In 2006, Egbert played for the Single-A Winston-Salem Warthogs and the Double-A Birmingham Barons. For the Warthogs, Egbert led the team in games started (25), innings pitched (140 2/3), strikeouts (120), and was also second in wins (9). With the Barons, he played in 4 games, all starts and had an 0–2 record despite an 0.86 ERA.

Egbert played the entire 2007 season for the Barons. He led the Barons in wins (12), innings pitched (161 2/3), and was second in strikeouts (165). Egbert was also a midseason All-Star.

On November 20, 2007, the White Sox purchased his contract, protecting him from the Rule 5 draft.

Egbert made his major league debut on April 21, 2009. After two appearances featuring 8 earned runs in 2.2 innings pitched, he was optioned back to the Triple-A Charlotte Knights of the International League on April 25, 2009.

=== New York Mets ===
On September 25, 2009, Egbert was claimed off of waivers by the New York Mets. He was designated for assignment on February 9, 2010. Egbert sat out the entire 2010 season due to Tommy John surgery. On May 25, 2012, Egbert was called up to New York, and Robert Carson was sent down to take his place. Egbert was 2–3 with a 2.08 ERA in 17 games with Triple-A Buffalo to begin the 2012 season. On October 6, 2012, Egbert elected free agency.

== Personal life ==
Jack Egbert is from Rutherford, New Jersey and has 1 son named Jackson (born 2011) and coaches/coached baseball for the Concord Athletics. Jackson Egbert is developing as an athlete on the Screamin Eagles baseball team and the senior Egbert is currently the head Coach/General Manager of the Screamin Eagles
