= Josh Fields (infielder) =

American baseball player (born 1982)

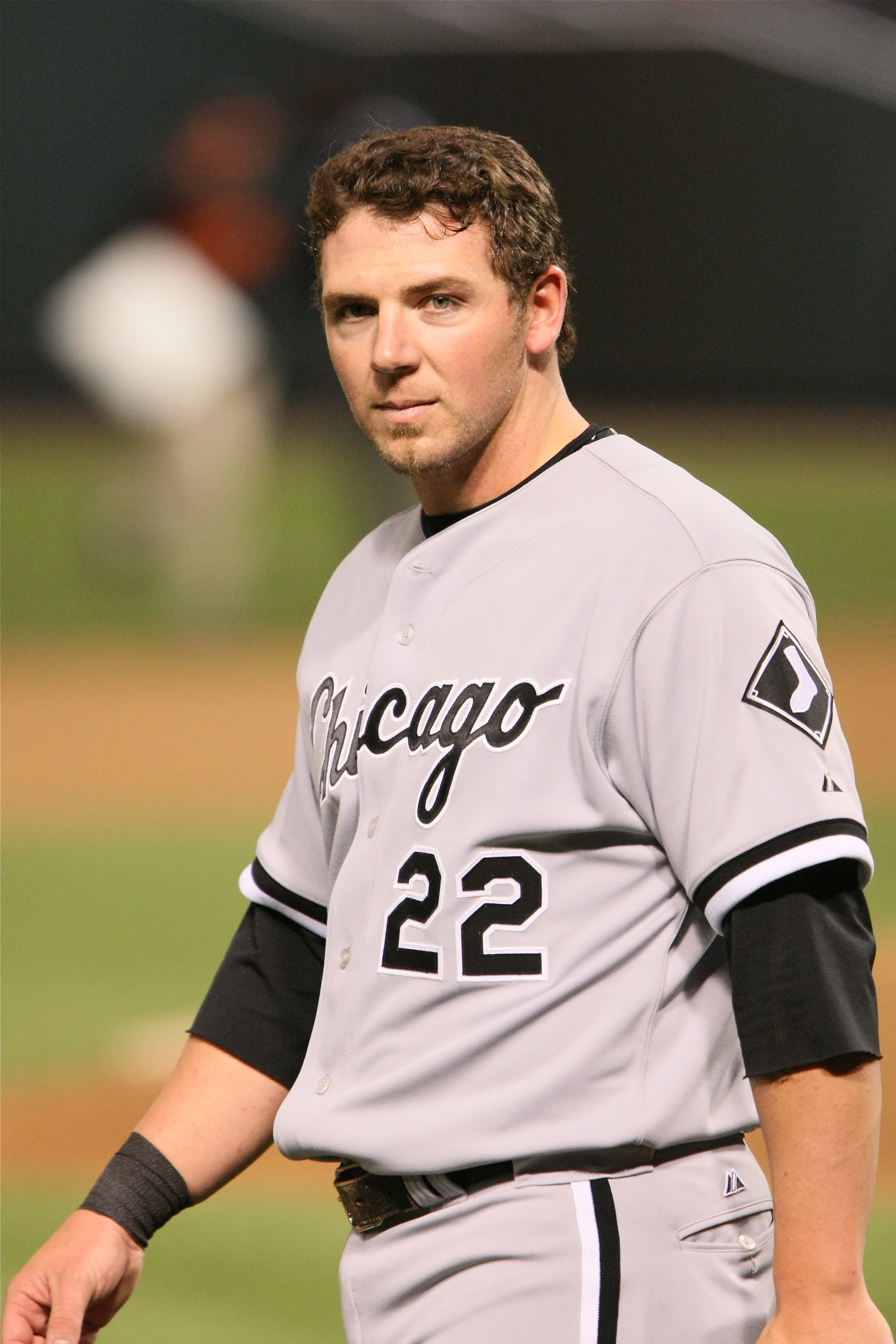
- Fields with the Chicago White Sox
- Third baseman
- Born: December 14, 1982 (age 43); Ada, Oklahoma, U.S.
- Batted: Right Threw: Right

Professional debut
- MLB: September 13, 2006, for the Chicago White Sox
- NPB: July 10, 2011, for the Yomiuri Giants

Last appearance
- MLB: October 2, 2010, for the Kansas City Royals
- NPB: October 6, 2011, for the Yomiuri Giants

MLB statistics
- Batting average: .234
- Home runs: 34
- Runs batted in: 107

NPB statistics
- Batting average: .202
- Home runs: 2
- Runs batted in: 9
- Stats at Baseball Reference

Teams
- Chicago White Sox (2006–2009); Kansas City Royals (2010); Yomiuri Giants (2011)

Joshua Dean Fields (born December 14, 1982) is an American former professional baseball infielder. He played in Major League Baseball (MLB) for the Chicago White Sox and Kansas City Royals, and in Nippon Professional Baseball (NPB) for the Yomiuri Giants.

== Collegiate career ==
Fields was a two-sport athlete at Oklahoma State University, playing both baseball and football. He was selected as a Big 12 Conference All-Star at third base in 2003, and had a career batting average of .364 over three years. Fields also earned three letters as a quarterback for the Cowboys. He led the team to two bowl games, including setting the Cotton Bowl Classic record with 307 passing yards against the University of Mississippi.

He has the school record for single game passing touchdowns with 7 against SMU

== Professional career ==
=== Chicago White Sox ===
Fields was selected as the 18th overall pick in the first round of the 2004 Major League Baseball draft by the Chicago White Sox. Entering 2005, he was ranked as the fourth-best prospect in the White Sox organization and the 95th-best prospect in Major League Baseball by Baseball America. He hit safely in 14 straight games from August 6 – August 21 for the Birmingham Barons, tied for the eighth-longest streak in the Southern League.

Prior to the 2006 season, Fields was once again ranked as the fourth-best prospect in the White Sox organization by Baseball America. He homered in four consecutive games from May 11 – May 14 with the Charlotte Knights, and was selected to play in the All-Star Futures Game at Pittsburgh's PNC Park. Fields made his major league debut on September 13, 2006 against the Los Angeles Angels of Anaheim, but did not record his first major league at-bat until September 18. In that game against the Detroit Tigers, Fields hit a pinch-hit home run off Detroit's Jamie Walker. He became the third player in White Sox history to hit a home run in his first major league at-bat, joining Carlos Lee (May 7, 1999) and Miguel Olivo (September 15, 2002) as the only other White Sox to do so.

Fields entered the 2007 season ranked as the second-best prospect in the White Sox organization and the 45th-best prospect in Major League Baseball by Baseball America. Although he started the season at Triple-A Charlotte, he was called up to the White Sox in June after a season ending back injury to third baseman Joe Crede. He recorded his first multi-home run game on August 10 against the Seattle Mariners, hitting both off starter Jarrod Washburn. On August 26, 2007, Fields made his first start in left field, though he only played 21 games at that position before being moved back to third base.

Fields ended his first season as a Major Leaguer by hitting a promising .244, 23 home runs, 67 RBI, and an OPS of .788 in 100 games. His 23 home runs tied him with Bill Melton for the third-most home runs by a White Sox player in their rookie season, though Melton accomplished that feat in 157 games. Fields received one third-place vote for AL Rookie of the Year, finishing in a tie for seventh place in the overall voting.

Entering spring training for the 2008 season, Fields was expected to be the starting third baseman, with Crede likely to be traded. However, Crede arrived at camp fully recovered from his injury and White Sox general manager Kenny Williams was said to be unsatisfied with the trade offers. This resulted in Crede being given the starting job and Fields once again beginning the season in Triple-A Charlotte. Fields had a disappointing, injury-riddled season with the Knights, in which he regressed to a .246 batting average, 10 home runs, 35 RBI and .772 OPS in 75 games.

On July 25, 2008, he was called up to play with the White Sox after Crede was put on the 15-day disabled list. Fields underwent arthroscopic knee surgery at the end of the 2008 season, and was the White Sox's starting third baseman in 2009 until Gordon Beckham was recalled from Triple-A Charlotte on June 4 and took the position. On July 23, 2009, in a game against the Tampa Bay Rays, Fields hit a grand slam in his first plate appearance of the game. This would later end up being the game-winning home run in Mark Buehrle's perfect game over the Tampa Bay Rays, winning 5–0. Fields also caught the final out of the perfect game, a groundout to White Sox shortstop Alexei Ramírez. Six days later, he would be demoted to Triple-A Charlotte to make room for newly acquired Mark Kotsay.

=== Kansas City Royals ===
On November 6, 2009, Fields, along with Chris Getz, was traded by the White Sox to the Kansas City Royals in exchange for Mark Teahen. He played in 13 games for the Royals, hitting .306 with three home runs and 6 RBI.

=== Pittsburgh Pirates/Colorado Rockies ===
On December 20, 2010, Fields was signed to a minor league contract by the Pittsburgh Pirates. However, on March 28, he was traded by the Pirates to the Colorado Rockies at the conclusion of spring training for a player to be named later or cash considerations. He recorded a .365 batting average with 11 home runs and 45 RBI in 50 games with the Triple-A Colorado Springs Sky Sox before being released on June 28, in order to pursue a career in Japan.

=== Yomiuri Giants ===
Fields signed with the Yomiuri Giants of Nippon Professional Baseball in Japan on June 28, 2011. In 40 games with the Giants, he hit only .202 with two home runs and 9 RBI.

=== Los Angeles Dodgers ===
Fields signed a minor league contract with the Los Angeles Dodgers on January 4, 2012. After failing to win a spot on the Dodgers Opening Day roster, he was assigned to the Triple-A Albuquerque Isotopes. He played in 133 games for the Isotopes, posting a .322 average with 13 home runs and 71 RBI.

=== Philadelphia Phillies ===
On November 16, 2012, Fields signed with the Philadelphia Phillies. He played in 109 games with the Triple-A Lehigh Valley IronPigs in 2013, batting .289 with four home runs and 45 RBI. He elected free agency on November 4.

=== Piratas de Campeche ===
On April 15, 2014, Fields signed with the Piratas de Campeche of the Mexican League. He was released on May 23. In 30 games he hit .297/.336/.475 with 5 home runs, 29 RBIs and 1 stolen base.

On February 24, 2015, Fields re-signed with Campeche. He was released on May 6. In 25 games he hit .245/.346/.351 with 1 home run and 9 RBIs.

== See also ==
- Home run in first Major League at-bat
