= Jeff Marquez =

American baseball player (born 1984)

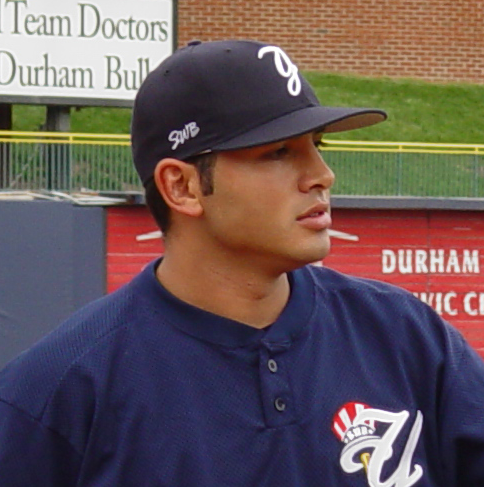
- Pitcher
- Born: August 10, 1984 (age 41); Vacaville, California, U.S.
- Batted: Right Threw: Right

MLB debut
- July 9, 2010, for the Chicago White Sox

Last MLB appearance
- June 19, 2011, for the New York Yankees

MLB statistics
- Win–loss record: 0–0
- Earned run average: 5.40
- Strikeouts: 2
- Stats at Baseball Reference

Teams
- Chicago White Sox (2010); New York Yankees (2011)
Medals
Men's baseball
Representing United States
Pan American Games
Silver medal – second place	2011 Guadalajara	National team

Jeffrey Joseph Marquez (born August 10, 1984) is an American former professional baseball pitcher. He played in Major League Baseball (MLB) for the Chicago White Sox and New York Yankees.

== Career ==
=== New York Yankees ===
Marquez attended Sacramento City College before being chosen by the New York Yankees in the supplemental round as the 41st overall pick of 2004 MLB draft. Marquez was a compensation pick for losing David Wells to the San Diego Padres.

In 2005, Marquez played for the Single-A Charleston RiverDogs. Making a team leading 27 starts, he went 9-13 with an ERA of 3.42. Marquez was second on the team to Chase Wright in wins (9), innings pitched (139 2/3), and strikeouts (107).

In 2007, Marquez played for the Double-A Trenton Thunder and was an Eastern League midseason All-Star for the team that year. Marquez went 15-9 with a 3.65 ERA for the Thunder. He led the league with 15 wins, was tied with 27 starts, was tied for second in innings pitched (155 1/3), tied for third in complete games (2), and was tenth in ERA (3.65).

On November 20, 2007, the New York Yankees purchased Marquez's contract, protecting him from the Rule 5 draft.

=== Chicago White Sox ===
On November 13, 2008, Marquez, along with minor league pitcher Jhonny Núñez, and utility man Wilson Betemit were traded to the Chicago White Sox for first baseman/outfielder Nick Swisher and minor league pitcher Kanekoa Texeira.

Marquez made his MLB debut on July 9, 2010, pitching the 9th inning vs. Kansas City allowing 2 runs in an 8-2 White Sox win. The White Sox recalled him on May 30, 2011. He was designated for assignment on June 5.

=== Return to Yankees ===
Marquez was claimed off waivers by the New York Yankees on June 8 and added to the MLB roster when Joba Chamberlain was placed on the DL. On August 27, the Yankees outrighted Marquez to the Triple-A Scranton/Wilkes-Barre Yankees. He was granted free agency in November 2011.

=== Seattle Mariners ===
On November 10, 2011, the Seattle Mariners signed Marquez to a minor league contract. He was released on July 24, 2012.

=== Colorado Rockies ===
He was signed by Colorado Rockies on Aug 11th, 2012, and assigned to Triple A Colorado Springs Sky Sox.

=== Cincinnati Reds ===
On January 2, 2013, he signed a minor league contract with the Cincinnati Reds but was released soon after.

=== Comeback attempt ===
After not playing for two years, he returned to active duty with the Sioux City Explorers of the independent American Association.

=== Pericos de Puebla ===
On March 11, 2016, Marquez signed with the Pericos de Puebla of the Mexican Baseball League. He was released on February 21, 2017.
