= Kanekoa Texeira =

American baseball player & coach (born 1986)

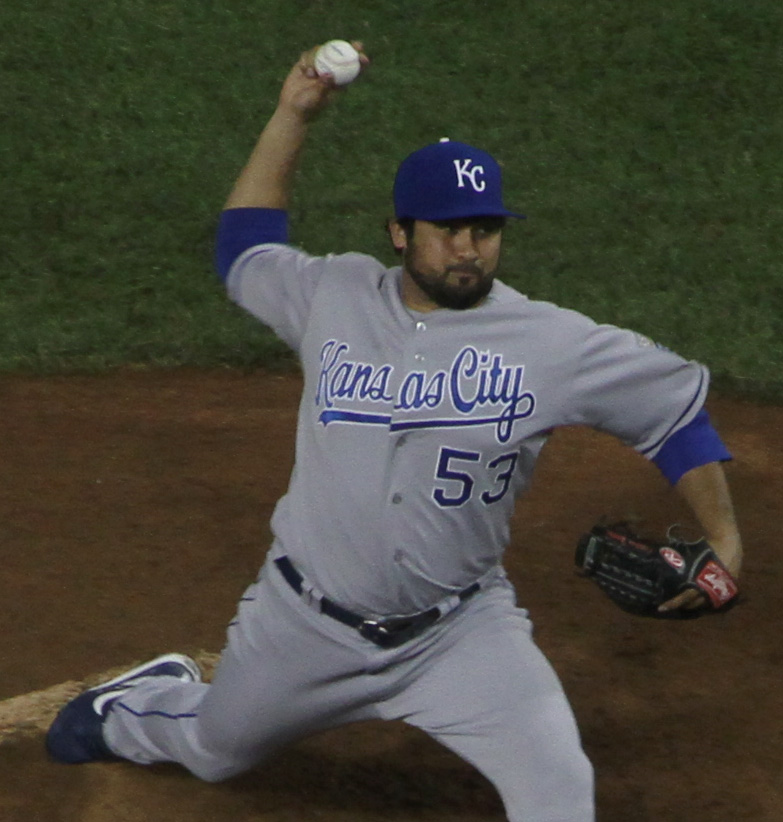
- Texeira with the Kansas City Royals
- Pitcher
- Born: February 6, 1986 (age 40); Kula, Hawaii, U.S.
- Batted: Right Threw: Right

MLB debut
- April 6, 2010, for the Seattle Mariners

Last MLB appearance
- September 6, 2011, for the Kansas City Royals

MLB statistics
- Win–loss record: 1–1
- Earned run average: 4.66
- Strikeouts: 33
- Stats at Baseball Reference

Teams
- Seattle Mariners (2010); Kansas City Royals (2010–2011)

Kanekoa Jacob Texeira (born February 6, 1986) is an American former professional baseball pitcher and the current manager of the Gwinnett Stripers, the Triple A affiliate of the Atlanta Braves. He played in Major League Baseball (MLB) for the Seattle Mariners and Kansas City Royals.

== Playing career ==
Texeira attended the Kamehameha Schools in Honolulu and Saddleback College in Mission Viejo, California.

=== Chicago White Sox ===
Texeira was selected by the Milwaukee Brewers in the 31st round of the 2004 Major League Baseball draft, but did not sign with the team.

Texeira was selected by Chicago White Sox in the 22nd round (675th overall) of the 2006 Major League Baseball draft. He signed on June 14, 2006, and debuted that season with the Bristol White Sox of the Appalachian League, before being promoted to the Kannapolis Intimidators of the South Atlantic League. After pitching all of 2007 in Kannapolis, he split 2008 between the High-A Winston-Salem Warthogs and the Double-A Birmingham Barons.

=== New York Yankees ===
On November 14, 2008, the White Sox traded Texeira along with first baseman/outfielder Nick Swisher in exchange for infielder Wilson Betemit, and minor league pitchers Jeffrey Marquez and Jhonny Nuñez. He played the 2009 season the Double-A Trenton Thunder.

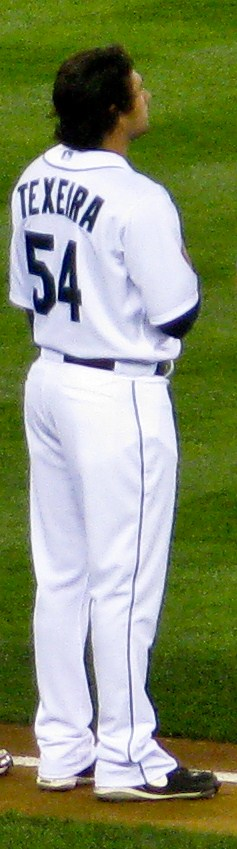
Texeira in 2010, with the Mariners.

=== Seattle Mariners ===
On December 10, 2009, Texeira was selected by the Seattle Mariners in the Rule 5 draft. Mariners General Manager Jack Zduriencik had been familiar with Texeira from his days with the Brewers, where he was scouting director when Texeira was drafted by the Brewers in 2004. Texeira made the Mariners' Opening Day roster following a strong performance in spring training. With the Mariners, he recorded a 5.30 ERA, 6.8 strikeouts per nine innings, and 4.8 walks per nine innings in 18 2/3 innings pitched. However, Texeira and Jesús Colomé were designated for assignment on May 31, as the Mariners promoted pitchers Sean White and Garrett Olson.

=== Kansas City Royals ===
On June 3, 2010, Texeira was claimed off waivers by the Kansas City Royals, who designated Brad Thompson for assignment to make room for him. On June 15, he recorded his first career win in a 15-7 Royals victory over the Houston Astros.

Texeira, after starting the 2011 season with Kansas City, was optioned to the Triple-A Omaha Storm Chasers on April 21. He had a 0–0 record with a 2.84 ERA in six games at the time of his demotion. Texeira was designated for assignment on May 18.

=== New York Yankees (second stint) ===
On May 25, 2011, Texeira was claimed off waivers by the New York Yankees. He was released by the Yankees on July 6, after making six appearances with the Triple-A Scranton/Wilkes-Barre Yankees, struggling to a 22.85 ERA. On July 20, he re-signed with the Yankees organization on a minor league contract. Texeira made his Double-A season debut for the Trenton Thunder of the Eastern League on August 5. After 1 1/3 innings, he was pulled after giving up 6 hits for 4 runs (an ERA of 20.25), striking one out, and walking another. The Thunder went on to lose to the Altoona Curve, 8–2. Since then, Texeira reduced his ERA, making continued progress until a slight setback on August 13. Appearing with an ERA down to 8.10 in a game against the Harrisburg Senators with the Thunder leading 7–3 in the ninth, Chris McConnell of the Senators led off the ninth with a solo homer. Settling in, Texeira closed out the ninth and posted an ERA standing at 8.31.

=== Cincinnati Reds/Bridgeport Bluefish ===
Texeira signed a minor league contract with the Cincinnati Reds on December 15, 2011. After one season with the Triple-A Louisville Bats, he joined the Bridgeport Bluefish of the Atlantic League of Professional Baseball in 2013. He was named to the 2013 Atlantic League All-Star team. On July 4, 2013, the Reds purchased the contract of Texeira from Bridgeport, and he returned to Louisville. Texeira signed with the Bluefish for the 2014 season.

=== Atlanta Braves ===
On June 23, 2014, Texeira signed a minor league contract with the Atlanta Braves. He was assigned to the Triple-A Gwinnett Braves.

== Coaching career ==
Texiera was named as the pitching coach for the rookie level Danville Braves in the Atlanta Braves organization for the 2017 and 2018 seasons. He was promoted to pitching coach of the Single-A Rome Braves for the 2019 season. In March 2021, Texeira was named as the manager of the Rome Braves, the High-A affiliate of the Atlanta Braves.

Before the 2023 minor league season began, Texeira was named manager of the Double-A Mississippi Braves. He was named the manager of the Triple-A Gwinnett Stripers for the 2024 season.

On July 2, 2026, Texeira was announced as the bench coach for the National League at the All-Star Futures Game.

== Personal life ==
Texeira is a cousin of former MLB outfielder Shane Victorino.
