= Wes Whisler =

American baseball player (born 1983)

- Pitcher
- Born: April 7, 1983 (age 43); Indianapolis, Indiana, U.S.
- Batted: Left Threw: Left

MLB debut
- June 2, 2009, for the Chicago White Sox

Last appearance
- June 7, 2009, for the Chicago White Sox

MLB statistics
- Win–loss record: 0–0
- Earned run average: 13.50
- Strikeouts: 2
- Stats at Baseball Reference

Teams
- Chicago White Sox (2009)

Wesley Guy Whisler (born April 7, 1983) is an American former professional baseball pitcher. He played in Major League Baseball (MLB) for the Chicago White Sox in 2009.

== Amateur career ==
Whisler attended Noblesville High School in Noblesville, Indiana where he was named Indiana's Mr. Baseball his senior year (2001). He was drafted out of high school in the 41st round by the Chicago Cubs, but opted to play three seasons for the UCLA Bruins. In 2002 and 2003, he played collegiate summer baseball in the Cape Cod Baseball League for the Yarmouth-Dennis Red Sox, and received the league's Outstanding Pro Prospect award in 2002.

== Professional career ==
Whisler was drafted 53rd overall by the Chicago White Sox in the 2004 Major League Baseball draft and made his MLB debut on June 6, 2009, for Chicago. He appeared in three games for the White Sox with no decisions, giving up 2 earned runs in 1⅓ innings for an earned run average of 13.50. On June 18, 2010, Whisler was traded to the Florida Marlins for future considerations.

Whisler was granted free agent status at the conclusion of the 2010 baseball season and re-signed with the White Sox on March 8, 2011. He did not have any Major League appearances for the White Sox, instead playing for the Low A Kannapolis Intimidators, for the High A Winston-Salem Dash, Double A Birmingham Barons and finishing the season with the Charlotte Knights.

On April 24, 2012, Whisler was released after recording and 0–1 record, 6.35 ERA, two walks and two strikeouts in five and a third innings with the White Sox Triple-A team the Charlotte Knights.
