= Clayton Richard =

American baseball player (born 1983)

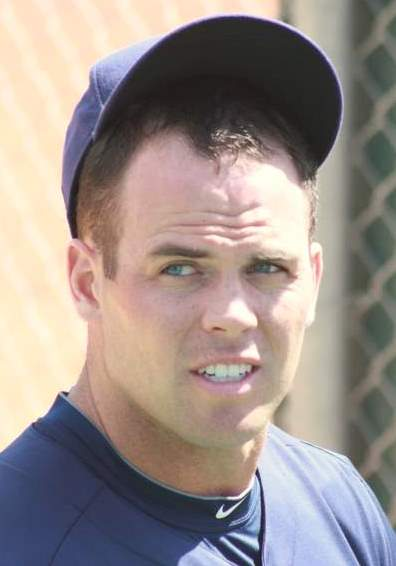
- Richard with the San Diego Padres
- Pitcher
- Born: September 12, 1983 (age 43); Lafayette, Indiana, U.S.
- Batted: Left Threw: Left

MLB debut
- July 23, 2008, for the Chicago White Sox

Last MLB appearance
- July 13, 2019, for the Toronto Blue Jays

MLB statistics
- Win–loss record: 69–84
- Earned run average: 4.51
- Strikeouts: 824
- Stats at Baseball Reference

Teams
- Chicago White Sox (2008–2009); San Diego Padres (2009–2013); Chicago Cubs (2015–2016); San Diego Padres (2016–2018); Toronto Blue Jays (2019)

Clayton Colby Richard (born September 12, 1983) is an American former professional baseball pitcher. He played in Major League Baseball (MLB) for the Chicago White Sox, San Diego Padres, Chicago Cubs, and Toronto Blue Jays.

== High school ==
Richard was awarded Indiana's Mr. Football and Mr. Baseball his senior year at McCutcheon High School. He was also his class's valedictorian.

== College ==
Richard accepted a scholarship to play football and baseball at the University of Michigan in the fall of 2003.

Richard was redshirted for the Wolverines football team his first year. In 2004, he battled for the starting quarterback spot on the team but lost it to Chad Henne. Richard was the Wolverine's No. 2 quarterback that season, but he saw limited action, mostly in blowout wins over Miami (Ohio), Indiana, and Northwestern. Richard appeared in four total games for the Wolverines in 2004, only attempting 15 passes for eight completions and 52 total yards.

The following spring, Richard joined the Wolverines baseball team and pitched well. In his one season in Ann Arbor, Richard pitched 21 games, mostly as a reliever and compiled a 0–1 record with a 2.43 ERA, a 1.20 WHIP, and 27 K's in 33.1 IP, good for a 7.29 K/9 innings ratio. The Wolverines were 42–19 that season and finished fourth in the Big 10 with a 17–12 conference record. They were the third seed in the Atlanta Regional of the College Baseball Tournament but were eliminated in the second round of the Regionals, losing both games to South Carolina by one run. After starting his baseball career with moderate success, Richard dropped his football scholarship at Michigan and focused on baseball full-time.

== Professional career ==
=== Chicago White Sox (first stint) ===
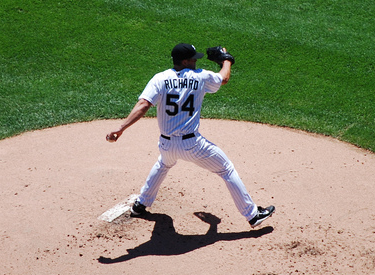
Richard in major league debut with the White Sox in 2008

The White Sox selected Richard in the eighth round (245th overall) of the 2005 MLB draft. He was the second player from Michigan drafted, the first being Chris Getz, also selected by the Sox in the fourth round. He made his professional debut with the Rookie-level Great Falls White Sox and also played for the Single-A Kannapolis Intimidators in 2005, going 2–2 with a 3.33 ERA in 13 games (11 starts). In 2006, he played for Kannapolis and the High-A Winston-Salem Warthogs, posting a 7–9 record and 3.85 ERA in 22 games (21 starts) between the two teams. He returned to Winston-Salem in 2007, and pitched to an 8–12 record and 3.63 ERA in 28 games (27 starts) with 99 strikeouts in 161.1 innings pitched. In 2008, he played with the Double-A Birmingham Barons and Triple-A Charlotte Knights, and posted a 12–6 record and 2.89 ERA in 20 starts for the two affiliates.

On July 23, 2008, Richard made his major league debut, allowing five runs (four earned) on seven hits in four innings pitched against the Texas Rangers. In 13 appearances (eight starts) for Chicago, Richard struggled to a 2–5 record and 6.04 ERA. In 2009, Richard was initially used out of the bullpen, but was later moved to the starting rotation on May 12, and appeared in 26 games (14 starts) for the White Sox, registering a 4–3 record and 4.65 ERA.

=== San Diego Padres ===
On July 31, 2009, Richard was traded along with Aaron Poreda, Adam Russell and Dexter Carter to the San Diego Padres for 2007 Cy Young Award-winner Jake Peavy.

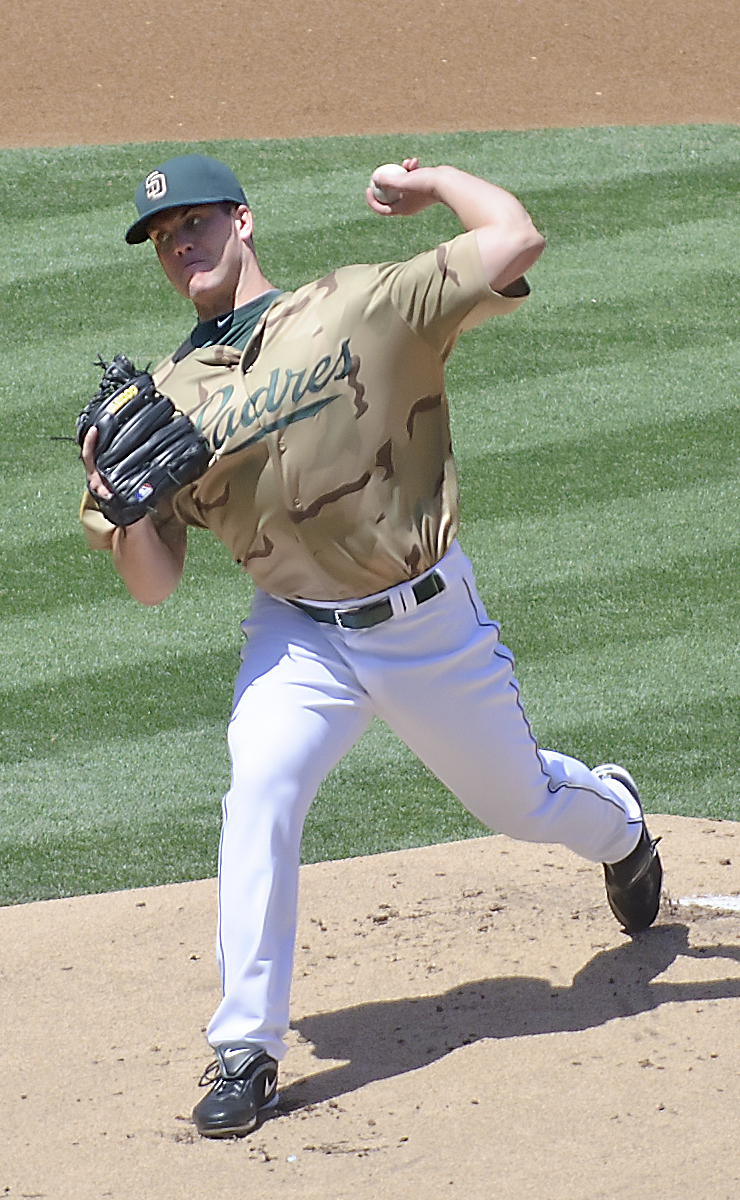
Richard in 2010

Richard made his first start for the Padres on August 1, 2009, recording no decision in 5 2/3 innings at home against the Milwaukee Brewers. Richard compiled a 5–2 record with a 4.08 ERA over 12 starts in his partial season with the Padres.

Richard started 33 games for the Padres in 2010, building a 14–9 record and a 3.75 ERA over 201 2/3 innings. On September 21, 2010, Richard threw his first career shutout, giving up eight hits, two walks, and recording six strikeouts in a win against the Los Angeles Dodgers along with a golden sombrero at the plate, striking out four times.

In 2011, Richard regressed slightly, posting a 5–9 record with a 3.88 ERA in 18 starts, while his strikeout-to-walk ratio dropped to 1.39 K/BB from 1.93 K/BB in 2010. A left shoulder strain forced Richard to the disabled list in July and later required arthroscopic surgery, ending his season.

In 2012, Richard resumed his role in the Padres starting rotation. At the end of the season, he was the unanimous pick as the Padres Pitcher of the Year by writers covering the team. He had a 14–14 record with a 3.99 earned run average. His 33 starts were tied for second in the National League (NL) and he was fourth with 218 2/3 innings pitched.

On February 16, 2013, Richard and the Padres avoided going to arbitration, both sides agreeing on a $5.24 million deal for one season.

Richard opened 2013 as the Padres number two starter, but had a rough beginning to the season, posting an 8.54 ERA in his first six starts. An intestinal virus forced Richard to push back a start in late April, and he was then placed on the disabled list on May 5 when the virus flared up again. Richard returned on May 27, but continued to struggle. On June 1, Richard pitched two innings in relief to earn his first win of the season in a 17-inning affair against the Blue Jays that the Padres won 4–3. On June 21, Richard injured his left shoulder and left the game after making only two pitches. He underwent shoulder surgery on July 15, ending his 2013 season. He finished with a 2–5 record in 12 games (11 starts) with a 7.01 ERA and 24 strikeouts in 52 2/3 innings. On October 28, 2013, he refused an outright assignment and elected free agency.

Richard underwent Thoracic Outlet Syndrome surgery in February 2014.

=== Arizona Diamondbacks ===
On July 30, 2014, Richard agreed to a minor league deal with the Arizona Diamondbacks. Richard made three starts for the Double-A Mobile BayBears, posting an 0–2 record and 6.60 ERA, and allowed three runs in 6.1 innings in one start for the Triple-A Reno Aces. He became a free agent after the 2014 season.

=== Pittsburgh Pirates ===
On December 3, 2014, Richard signed a minor league deal with an invite to spring training with the Pittsburgh Pirates. Through nine starts for the Triple-A Indianapolis Indians, Richard had a 2.09 ERA in 50 innings of work, also pitching in one game for the High-A Bradenton Marauders.

=== Chicago Cubs ===
On July 3, 2015, Richard was traded to the Chicago Cubs for cash. The next day he had his contract selected to the major league roster. His first start for the Cubs was a 7–2 victory against the Miami Marlins on July 4. After going 1–0 in three appearances (two starts), Richard was outrighted to AAA. After one start in AAA, Richard was called up to start on August 2 against the Milwaukee Brewers. Richard got the victory, pitching six innings of one-run ball, striking out three and walking none. He was designated for assignment a second time a day later. After electing for free agency, Richard re-signed with the club two days later to take a bullpen role when reliever Rafael Soriano developed a sore shoulder. Richard pitched to a 3.38 ERA over 21 1/3 innings with two walks and one home run out of the bullpen over the rest of the year, and finished the 2015 season 4–2 with a 3.83 ERA in 23 games (three starts).

In 2016, Richard was used as a situational leftie out of the bullpen until he was placed on the disabled list on June 21 with a blister on his finger. He returned to the bullpen in July but was designated for assignment on July 26 when Aroldis Chapman was added to the roster and then released on August 3. With the Cubs in 2016, Richard was 0–1 with a 6.43 ERA in 14 innings over 25 games. He was released on August 3. The Cubs went on to win the World Series, and Richard was presented with a World Series ring when he returned to Wrigley Field with the Padres in 2017.

=== Return to San Diego ===
On August 6, 2016, the Padres signed Richard to a major league deal. He made his Padres return debut in the San Diego bullpen upon the first week of August. After two appearances out of the bullpen, Richard joined the San Diego rotation and made nine starts over the remainder of the season. With the Padres in 2016, he went 3–3 with a 2.52 ERA over 53 2/3 innings with 34 strikeouts. On December 20, Richard signed a one-year contract to stay with the Padres.

Richard was a fixture in the San Diego rotation in 2017, leading the team with 197 1/3 innings over his 32 starts, including two complete games. He allowed a league-high 240 hits with a 4.79 ERA, but was third in the Major Leagues with a 59.2% ground ball rate and posted a personal best 6.9 strikeouts per 9 innings. In 2017, he led the major leagues in allowing opposing batters the highest batting average on balls in play (.351). He tied for the major league lead in pickoffs, with seven, while allowing four stolen bases and having 10 caught stealing. Richard was the Padres' nominee for both the Heart & Hustle Award and the Marvin Miller Man of the Year Award. In September, the Padres extended Richard through 2019 with a two-year deal.

On August 28, 2018, he was ruled out for the season after undergoing knee surgery. He ended the season 7–11 with an ERA of 5.33 in 27 starts. In 158 2/3 innings, he struck out 108.

On December 20, 2018, Richard was designated for assignment.

=== Toronto Blue Jays ===
On December 30, 2018, Richard was traded to the Toronto Blue Jays for minor league outfielder Connor Panas.

On March 29, 2019, he was placed on the injured list, with an injury to his right knee. On May 23, he made his season debut against the Boston Red Sox. He pitched four innings, allowing one run on two hits in a no decision. Pitching for Toronto in 2019, he was 1–5 with a 5.96 ERA in 10 starts covering 45.1 innings, and pitching for their AAA affiliate Buffalo he was 0–0 with a 5.06 ERA in two starts covering 5.1 innings. On September 12, 2019, his 36th birthday, the Blue Jays released Richard.

After the season, on October 10, he was selected for the United States national baseball team in the 2019 WBSC Premier 12.

=== Chicago White Sox (second stint) ===
On August 3, 2020, Richard signed a minor league contract with the Chicago White Sox organization. Richard did not play in a game in 2020 due to the cancellation of the minor league season because of the COVID-19 pandemic. He became a free agent on November 2.

== Post-playing career ==
On May 30, 2021, Richard joined the football coaching staff at Lafayette Jefferson High School as a quarterbacks coach. On July 6, 2021, Richard was announced to be the head coach for baseball at Lafayette Jefferson High School. In June 2024, he resigned from his post of head coach but was reported to continue his association with football team as quarterbacks coach.

== Playing style ==
Richard is a pitch to contact pitcher, inducing groundouts at over a 49% rate through 2012. He also has pitched well at Petco Park, posting an ERA under 3.30 each year from 2010 to 2012.

From 2009 to 2013, Richard's pitching repertoire consisted of a four-seam and a two-seam fastball (90–95 MPH), a changeup, a slider, and an occasional curveball. Since 2011, he has relied more on his two-seam fastball than his four seam, with this he has induced more than a 50% groundball rate each year since 2011.

== Personal life ==
Richard and his wife Ashley reside in Lafayette, Indiana, with their two sons and daughter.
