= Jhonny Núñez =

Dominican baseball player (born 1985)

- Pitcher
- Born: November 26, 1985 (age 40); San José de las Matas, Dominican Republic
- Batted: Right Threw: Right

MLB debut
- August 2, 2009, for the Chicago White Sox

Last appearance
- September 26, 2009, for the Chicago White Sox

MLB statistics
- Won-loss record: 0-0
- Earned run average: 9.53
- Strikeouts: 3
- Stats at Baseball Reference

Teams
- Chicago White Sox (2009)

Jhonny J. Núñez (born November 26, 1985) is a Dominican former professional baseball pitcher. He played for the Chicago White Sox of Major League Baseball during the 2009 season.

== Career ==
Núñez signed with the Los Angeles Dodgers in 2006. He pitched in the rookie-level Gulf Coast League for the GCL Dodgers, where he accrued a win-loss record of 6-0 and an earned run average (ERA) of 1.58 in seven games started and 3 relief appearances; he struck out 56 batters in 57 innings. The Los Angeles organization recognized Núñez as their top minor league pitcher for the month of July.

On August 31, 2006, the Dodgers traded Núñez to the Washington Nationals for veteran utility player Marlon Anderson. In 2007, Núñez pitched for the Hagerstown Suns of the Low-A South Atlantic League. He logged 105 2/3 innings in 22 starts and one relief appearance, winning 4, losing 6, and recording a 4.05 ERA. In 2008, Núñez pitched for the High-A Potomac Nationals and Double-A Harrisburg Senators, converting to relief.

On July 31, 2008, the Nationals traded Núñez to the New York Yankees for infielder Alberto Gonzalez and joined the Yankees Double-A affiliate, the Trenton Thunder. On November 13, 2008, the Yankees traded Núñez, Wilson Betemit, and Jeff Marquez to the Chicago White Sox for Nick Swisher and Kanekoa Texeira. He made his major league debut for the White Sox on August 2, 2009, at U.S. Cellular Field. Nunez retired the Yankees' Johnny Damon, the only batter he faced, on a ground ball to shortstop.

The Tampa Bay Rays signed Núñez to a minor league contract on December 1, 2011. Núñez was granted free agency after the 2012 season with the Tampa Bay Rays and signed with Seattle Mariners on a minor league contract for the 2013 season with an invitation for spring training.

== Pitching style ==
Núñez is a fastball/slider pitcher with a 94-mph fastball that can reach 97 MPH. He also has a hard sinker. He has a three-quarters arm slot and can throw a changeup, but it's apparently a secondary pitch.

== Personal ==
During the offseason, Núñez lives in San Jose de las Matas, Dominican Republic. Also During the offseason Jhonny pitches in the Dominican Winter League LIDOM for The Gigantes del Cibao.
