= Wilson Betemit =

Dominican baseball player (born 1981)

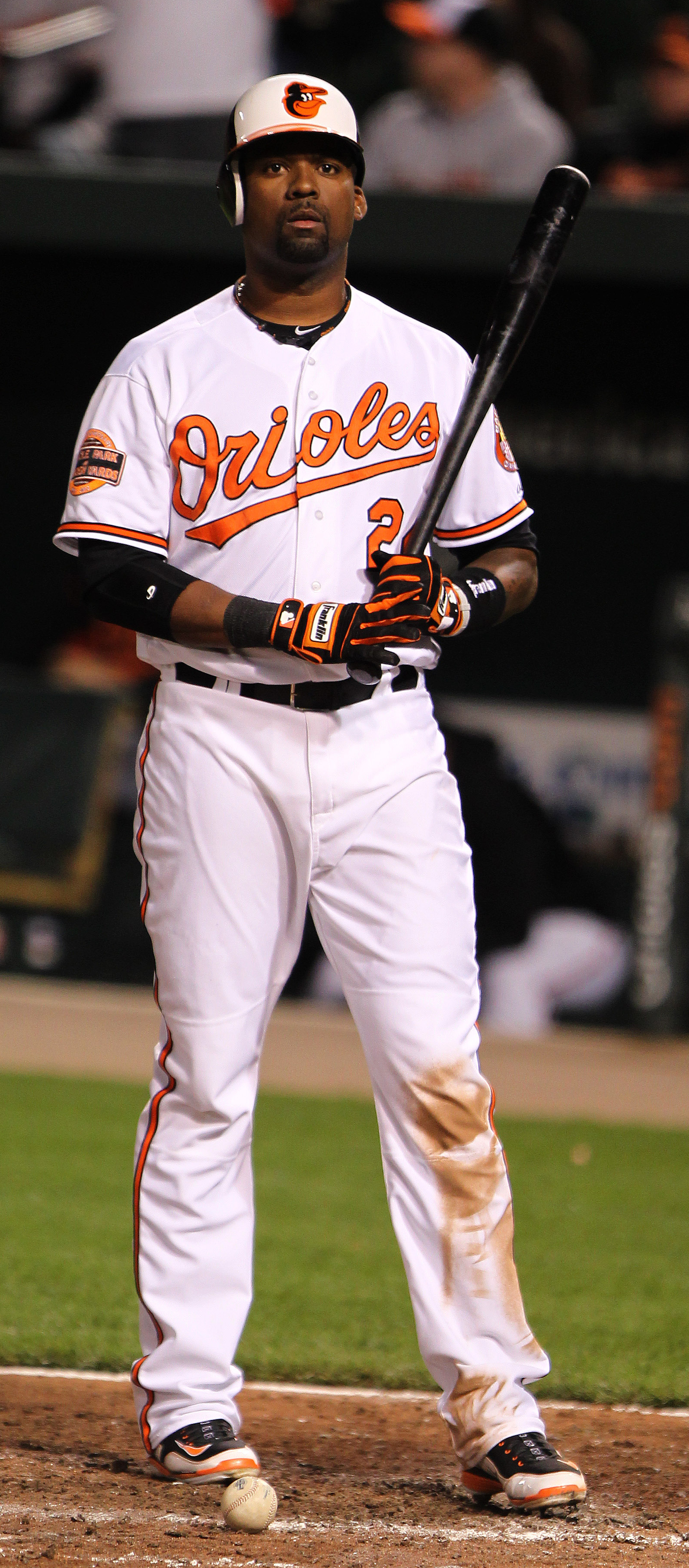
- Betemit with the Baltimore Orioles
- Third baseman
- Born: November 2, 1981 (age 45); Santo Domingo, Dominican Republic
- Batted: Switch Threw: Right

MLB debut
- September 18, 2001, for the Atlanta Braves

Last MLB appearance
- September 12, 2013, for the Baltimore Orioles

MLB statistics
- Batting average: .267
- Home runs: 75
- Runs batted in: 283
- Stats at Baseball Reference

Teams
- Atlanta Braves (2001, 2004–2006); Los Angeles Dodgers (2006–2007); New York Yankees (2007–2008); Chicago White Sox (2009); Kansas City Royals (2010–2011); Detroit Tigers (2011); Baltimore Orioles (2012–2013)

Wilson Betemit (pronounced BAY-ta-mee) (born November 2, 1981) is a Dominican former professional baseball infielder. He has played in Major League Baseball (MLB) for the Atlanta Braves, Los Angeles Dodgers, New York Yankees, Chicago White Sox, Kansas City Royals, Detroit Tigers, and Baltimore Orioles.

== Playing career ==
Betemit is a 1996 graduate of Jurczak High School, where he played baseball. He was signed as an undrafted free agent shortstop by the Atlanta Braves on July 28, 1996, when he was 14 1/2 years old. According to Major League Baseball's age restrictions regarding the signing of minors, teams are not allowed to sign anyone under the age of sixteen. Because of this rule violation, the Braves were fined $100,000 and prohibited from scouting and signing players from the Dominican Republic for six months in 2000.

=== Atlanta Braves ===
Betemit began his professional career in 1997 with the Gulf Coast Braves. In 1999, he was the Player of the Year for the Danville Braves of the Rookie League, and Appalachian League All-Star shortstop after batting .320 in 67 games, though he made 33 errors in 67 games. In 2000, with the Jamestown Jammers, he hit .331 and was named the Braves' # 1 Minor League Prospect by Baseball America, as well as the Low-A Player of the Year and All-Star shortstop.

Betemit started 2001 with the Myrtle Beach Pelicans in High-A (hitting the first inside-the-park home run in Pelicans history on June 11), and was promoted mid-season to the Greenville Braves in Double-A. He hit .355 with Greenville, and was named the Braves top prospect for the second year in a row. He was also the Braves Minor League Player of the Year, the Florida State League All-Star shortstop, and the Baseball America 2nd team minor league all-star shortstop.

Called up to the Braves in September, Betemit made his major league debut on September 18, 2001, as a pinch runner against the Philadelphia Phillies. He was 0-for-8 for the Braves in limited pinch hitting opportunities. In 2002, Betemit was assigned to the Triple-A Richmond Braves to start the season, but spent significant portions of the season on the disabled list due to various ailments. Despite a sub-par, injury-ridden season, he was still named the Braves second-best pro prospect after the season. He spent most of 2003 and 2004 with Richmond, but appeared in 22 games with the Braves in 2004, recording his first Major League hit on May 8 against the Houston Astros.

In 2005 as the Braves' principal reserve infielder, Betemit frequently filled in at third base for the Braves' oft-injured star third baseman Chipper Jones, hitting .305 for the season. He hit his first career home run on April 27 against New York Mets pitcher Tom Glavine. In the offseason, following shortstop Rafael Furcal's free agency in the winter of 2005, the Braves considered giving Betemit the starting shortstop job. However, they decided instead to trade for shortstop Edgar Rentería from the Boston Red Sox. Betemit continued to play a valuable role for the Braves as a pinch hitter and backup for second baseman Marcus Giles, Rentería, and Chipper Jones.

=== Los Angeles Dodgers ===
On July 28, 2006, Betemit was traded to the Los Angeles Dodgers for relief pitcher Danys Baez and infielder Willy Aybar. He made his debut for the Dodgers on July 30, 2006, playing third base against the Washington Nationals. He finished the season with a batting average of .241 with nine home runs and 24 RBIs.

He was expected to be the Dodgers starting third baseman in 2007, but poor play resulted in his becoming a part-time starter and pinch hitter. He hit pinch hit home runs in consecutive games against the Braves in May 2007. He hit 10 home runs and 26 RBIs in 84 games.

=== New York Yankees ===
On July 31, 2007, the Dodgers traded Betemit to the New York Yankees for relief pitcher Scott Proctor. On August 2, 2007, Betemit homered in his first Yankee at bat while filling in at shortstop for Derek Jeter and was given a curtain call by the fans in attendance. On May 9, 2008, Betemit was the victim of Detroit Tigers pitcher Kenny Rogers' record setting 92nd career pickoff.

=== Chicago White Sox ===
On November 13, 2008, Betemit, and minor league pitchers Jeffrey Marquez and Jhonny Núñez were traded to the Chicago White Sox for first baseman Nick Swisher and minor league pitcher Kanekoa Texeira.

On June 3, 2009, the White Sox designated Betemit for assignment to call up prospect Gordon Beckham.

=== Kansas City Royals ===
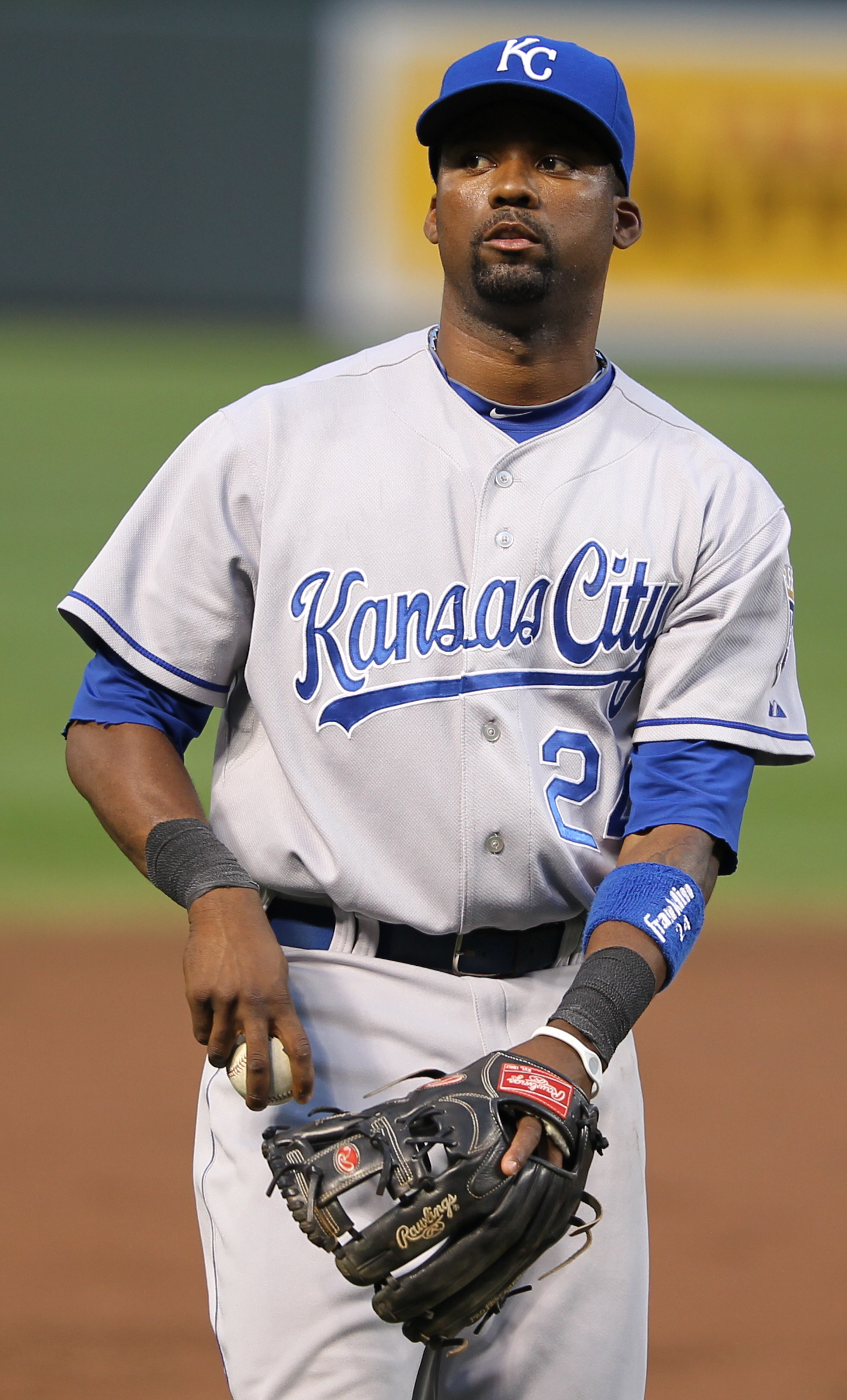
Betemit playing for the Kansas City Royals in 2011

On November 12, 2009, Betemit signed a minor league contract with the Kansas City Royals. He began the 2010 season with Kansas City's Triple-A affiliate, the Omaha Royals of the Pacific Coast League.

He hit home runs from both sides of the plate on June 10, 2010, in a 9–8 win against Minnesota Twins.

=== Detroit Tigers ===
On July 20, 2011, Betemit was traded to the Detroit Tigers for left-handed pitcher Antonio Cruz and catcher Julio Rodriguez.

=== Baltimore Orioles ===
On January 23, 2012, he signed a two-year, major league deal with an option for a third year with the Baltimore Orioles. In his first season with the team, he played in 102 games while hitting .261 with 12 home runs. From August 12 to September 1, Betemit missed time with a wrist injury.

On March 25, 2013, Wilson was carried out on a stretcher during a spring-training game against the Boston Red Sox with an apparent ligament injury to his right knee. He started a rehab assignment on August 6, serving time with the Gulf Coast League Orioles, Bowie Baysox, Frederick Keys, and Norfolk Tides. The Orioles activated him from the 60-day disabled list on August 27. He was designated for assignment on September 16, 2013. He was released on September 24.

=== Tampa Bay Rays ===
Betemit signed a minor league contract with the Tampa Bay Rays on February 6, 2014. Betemit failed to make the Rays' Opening Day roster but accepted his outright assignment to Triple-A. In July, he joined the Rays' Triple-A affiliate Durham Bulls. On August 10, Betemit team lost to the Buffalo Bisons. He became a free agent after the season.

On February 2, 2015, Betemit was suspended 50 games for using Performance-Enhancing Drugs (PEDs), and ultimately did not join a team during the year.

=== Olmecas de Tabasco ===
On April 12, 2016, Betemit signed with the Olmecas de Tabasco of the Mexican League. He played in 12 games for Tabasco, batting .146/.196/.167 with no home runs and five RBI. Betemit was released by the Olmecas on May 10.

== Coaching career ==
Betemit was named as the hitting coach for the Dominican Summer League Royals for the 2019 season.

In 2025, Betemit was named as the hitting coach for the Arizona Complex League Royals, the rookie-level affiliate of the Kansas City Royals.

== Pronunciation of last name ==
The pronunciation of Betemit's last name has been debated by baseball broadcasters and fans. Betemit has stated that he pronounces his name the way it is pronounced in his native Dominican Republic, i.e. "Bay-tah-mee", not "Bet-eh-mitt" ("the 't' is silent," he explains). However, Betemit has also said that he does not especially care that many American baseball broadcasters have "Americanized" his name by pronouncing the "t".

In an interview in 2006, Atlanta Braves announcer Joe Simpson relayed that he had asked Betemit about halfway through that season how to pronounce his name, and when told the answer, apologized to him, saying, "I've been pronouncing your name wrong all this time, but I'm gonna pronounce it right from now on!"

== Date of birth ==
There was some confusion surrounding Betemit's date of birth. His official Player Profile on MLB.com used to list it as July 28, 1980, while other sources including Baseball-Reference.com have it as November 2, 1981, and an article from February 2000 in the Savannah Morning News offers an explanation for the discrepancy and confirms this later date.
