= Gordon Beckham =

American baseball player (born 1986)

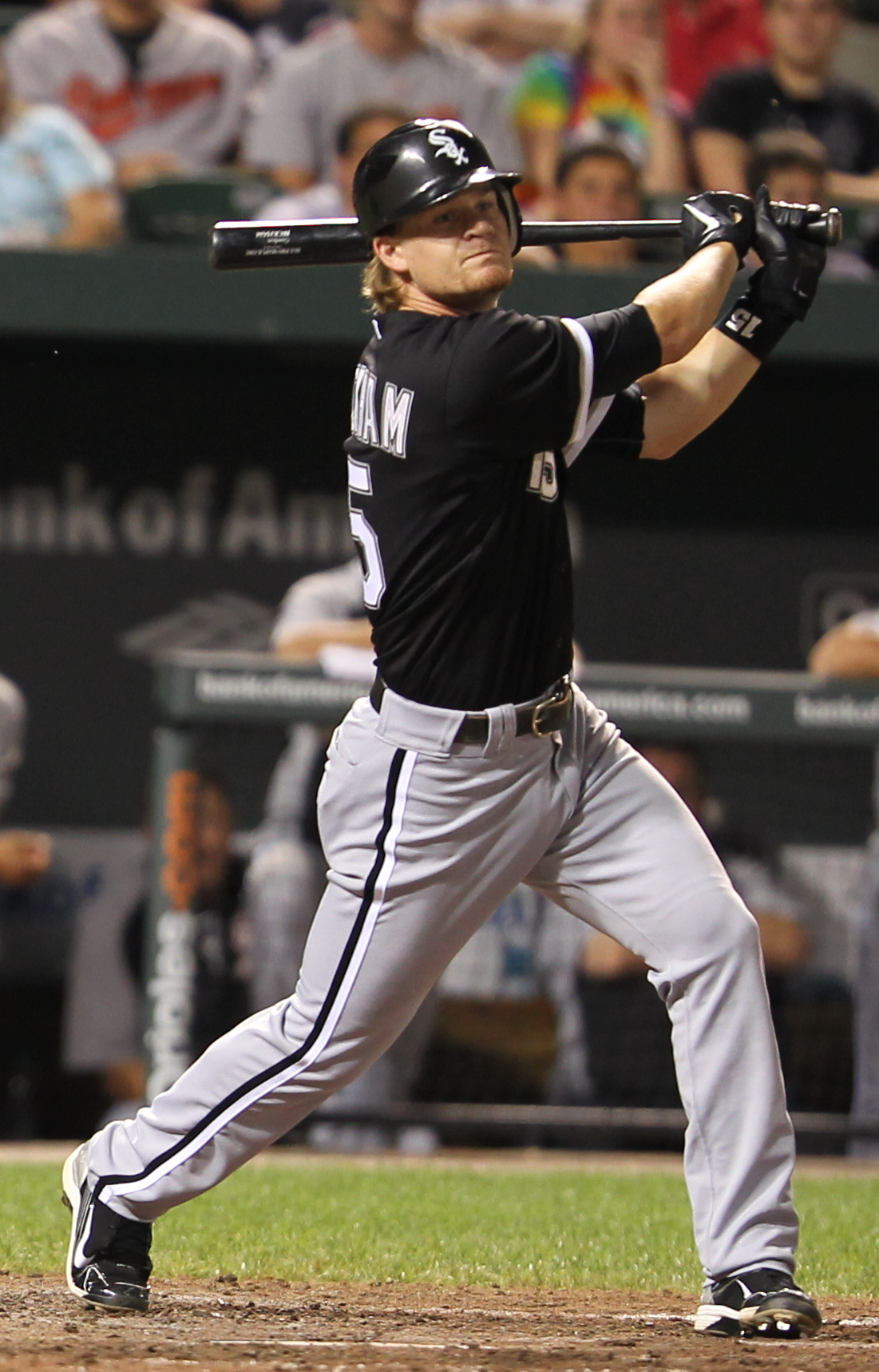
- Beckham with the Chicago White Sox
- Second baseman
- Born: September 16, 1986 (age 40); Atlanta, Georgia, U.S.
- Batted: Right Threw: Right

MLB debut
- June 4, 2009, for the Chicago White Sox

Last MLB appearance
- September 28, 2019, for the Detroit Tigers

MLB statistics
- Batting average: .237
- Home runs: 80
- Runs batted in: 351
- Stats at Baseball Reference

Teams
- Chicago White Sox (2009–2014); Los Angeles Angels of Anaheim (2014); Chicago White Sox (2015); Atlanta Braves (2016); San Francisco Giants (2016); Seattle Mariners (2017–2018); Detroit Tigers (2019)

James Gordon Beckham III (born September 16, 1986) is an American former professional baseball infielder who serves as a fill-in sportscaster for the Atlanta Braves and Chicago White Sox of Major League Baseball (MLB). He played in MLB for the White Sox, Los Angeles Angels of Anaheim, Braves, San Francisco Giants, Seattle Mariners, and Detroit Tigers.

== Amateur career ==
A native of Atlanta, Beckham attended The Westminster Schools, where he played quarterback and free safety on the football team.

Beckham went on to play college baseball for the University of Georgia. As a freshman in 2006, Beckham started all 81 at shortstop, helping to lead the Bulldogs to the College World Series. He was named a Freshman All-American that year. As a sophomore, he started all 56 games that Georgia played. After his sophomore season in 2007, he played collegiate summer baseball for the Yarmouth–Dennis Red Sox of the Cape Cod Baseball League, where he batted .284 with 9 home runs in 42 games, was named the starting shortstop for the East Division All-Star team, and helped lead the Red Sox to the league championship.

As a junior, he was the only unanimous selection to the All-SEC First Team and was selected as the SEC Player of the Year. He was also selected as an All-American, an Academic All-American, a Finalist for the NCAA Player of the Year and a Finalist for the Golden Spikes Award. He led the NCAA in home runs that year, setting the school's single season home run record (26) and tied the school record for most home runs in a career (51) against NC State on June 8, 2008 in the deciding third game of the Super Regionals that sent Georgia to the College World Series. The home run came on his last at-bat at his home Foley Field, after which he received a curtain call. On June 25, 2008 with his last at bat as a college player, Beckham tied Matt Clark of LSU as the 2008 season home run leader (28).

== Professional career ==
=== Chicago White Sox ===
==== Minor leagues ====
Beckham was selected eighth overall in the 2008 Major League Baseball draft by the Chicago White Sox. Considered the number one rated prospect in the White Sox system at the start of the 2009 season according to Baseball America, Beckham played in the Arizona Fall League for the Peoria Saguaros. He lit up the AFL, hitting .394 with three home runs and a .468 OBP in 66 at-bats. He continued to impress in Spring Training, hitting .270 with two home runs and six RBI in 37 at-bats. He forced his way into contention for the Sox' 25-man Opening Day roster, but it was eventually decided that he should start the season at the Sox's Double–A affiliate, the Birmingham Barons. After batting .299 over 38 games with the Barons, Beckham was promoted to the Triple–A Charlotte Knights on May 27, 2009 and switched from his natural position at shortstop to third base. This was seen as a clear indication that he was being prepared for a Major League call-up, as White Sox third baseman Josh Fields was struggling at the plate and on defense.

==== Major leagues ====
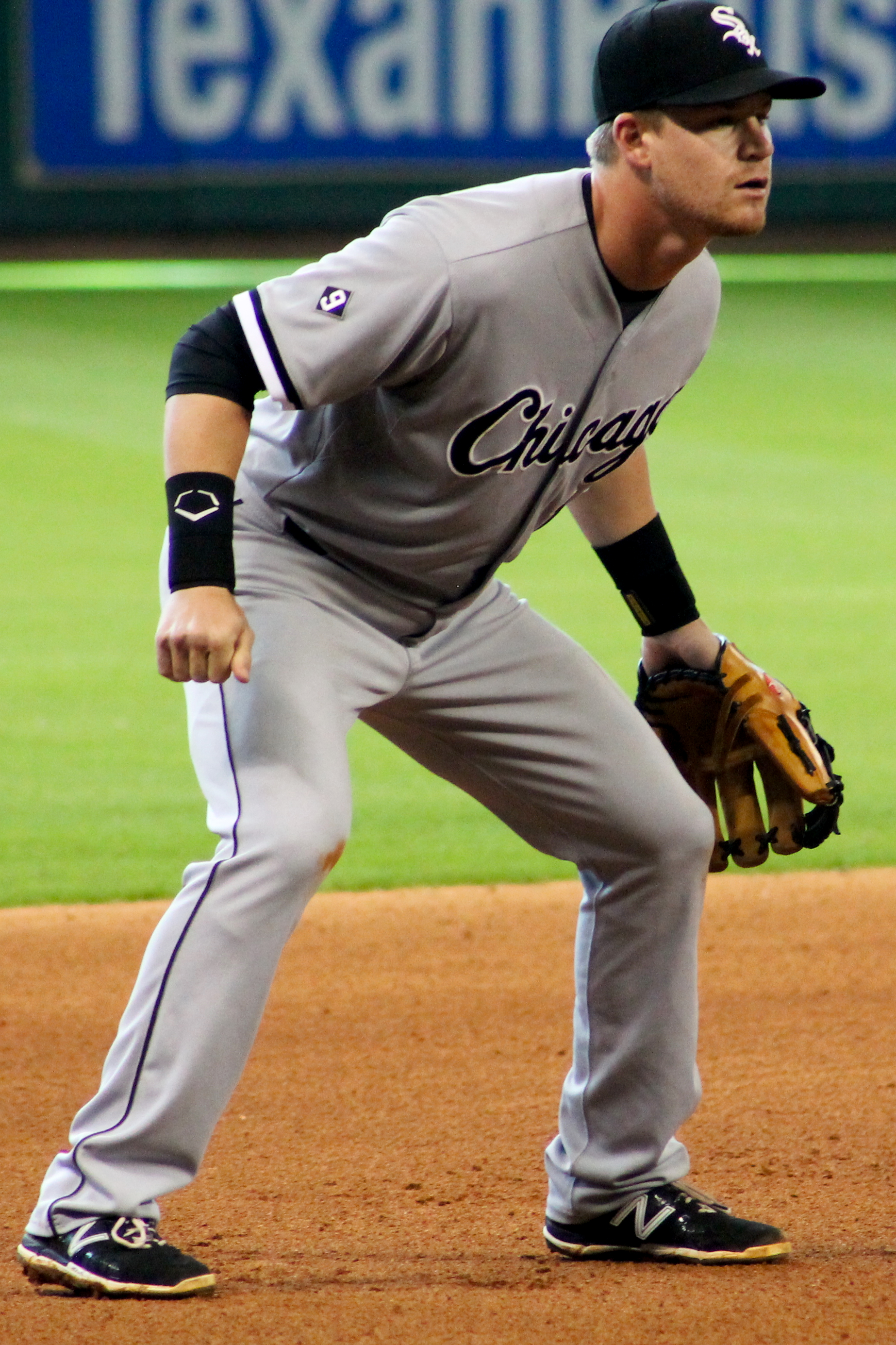
Beckham during a May 2015 game

On June 3, 2009, the White Sox purchased Beckham's contract, adding him to the major league roster after he had hit .326 with 23 doubles, four home runs and 25 RBI in 175 at-bats between Double–A Birmingham and Triple–A Charlotte. Thus, Beckham reached the Majors 364 days after he was drafted by the White Sox. He became the second position player from his draft class, behind the Giants' Conor Gillaspie, to make his MLB debut when, on June 4, he started at third base for the White Sox against the Oakland Athletics. In his debut Beckham went 0–3 with a strikeout and reached on a fielder's choice. He became the Sox' everyday starting third baseman, due to Josh Fields, and utility infielder Wilson Betemit's inadequacies at the plate and on defense.

Beckham struggled initially in the major leagues, going 2–for–28 over his first eight games. He got his first MLB hit, a single to center field, in his 14th at-bat on June 9, 2009 at U.S. Cellular Field, after which he received a standing ovation from the home crowd. On June 20, Beckham hit his first major league home run, a three-run shot in the fourth inning of the annual MLB Civil Rights Game, off Cincinnati Reds starting pitcher Johnny Cueto. Beckham's milestone home run came while the Reds were ahead 5–0, and sparked a comeback victory for the Sox. On June 27, Beckham hit a walk-off single with two men on and two out in the bottom of the 9th inning against the crosstown rival Chicago Cubs, his first walk-off hit. On June 29, Beckham went 3–for–3 with a walk and two RBI as the Sox beat the Cleveland Indians, 6–3.

In 103 games during his rookie campaign, Beckham slashed .270/.347/.460 with 14 home runs, 63 RBI, and seven stolen bases. On October 20, 2009, Beckham was named the Sporting News' 2009 American League Rookie of the Year, as selected by a panel of 338 major league players, 22 managers and 31 general managers and assistant general managers. On October 26, Beckham was voted the American League Rookie of the Year by the MLBPA, which is voted on in September by every player on a major league roster.

Beckham played in 131 games for Chicago in 2010, batting .252/.317/.378 with nine home runs and 49 RBI. He made 150 appearances for the team in 2011, slashing .230/.296/.337 with 10 home runs and 44 RBI. Beckham played in 151 games for the White Sox in 2012, hitting .234/.296/.371 with a career–high 16 home runs and 60 RBI.

Beckham made 103 appearances for Chicago in 2013, batting .267/.322/.372 with five home runs and 24 RBI. He began 2014 with the White Sox, posting a batting line of .221/.263/.336 with seven home runs and 36 RBI over 101 games.

=== Los Angeles Angels of Anaheim ===
On August 21, 2014, Beckham was traded to the Los Angeles Angels of Anaheim in exchange for a player to be named later. The trade was completed on February 4, 2015, as minor leaguer Yency Almonte was sent to the White Sox.

=== Chicago White Sox (second stint) ===
On January 28, 2015, Beckham signed a one-year, $2 million contract to return to the Chicago White Sox.

=== Atlanta Braves ===
Beckham signed a one-year deal with his hometown team, the Atlanta Braves on December 4, 2015. However, he battled hamstring injuries during his stint with Atlanta, which necessitated two stints on the disabled list.

=== San Francisco Giants ===
On September 27, 2016, Beckham was traded to the San Francisco Giants in exchange for minor leaguer Rich Rodriguez, with just six games left in the 2016 season. On February 8, 2017, Beckham re-signed with the Giants. On March 23, he requested (and was granted) his release so he could seek other opportunities.

=== Seattle Mariners ===
On March 31, 2017, the Seattle Mariners signed Beckham to a minor league contract. On September 2, the Mariners selected Beckham's contract. adding him to the active roster. In 11 games for the Mariners, he went 3–for–17 (.176) with one stolen base.

Beckham re–signed with Seattle on December 12, 2017, on a minor league contract. He was released on March 23, 2018, but again re-signed with the team on a new minor league deal on March 26. On May 14, the Mariners purchased Beckham's contract to their major league roster. He was designated for assignment following the acquisition of Adam Warren on July 30. After clearing waivers, Beckham was assigned outright to the Triple–A Tacoma Rainiers. On August 17, Beckham was added back to Seattle's roster after Jean Segura went on paternity leave. In 22 games for the Mariners in 2018, he slashed .182/.250/.205 with one RBI and one stolen base.

=== Detroit Tigers ===
On January 22, 2019, Beckham signed a minor league contract with the Detroit Tigers that included an invitation to spring training. On March 23, the Tigers added Beckham to their 25–man roster. Beckham played in 83 games for the Tigers, hitting .215 with six home runs and 15 RBI. He became a free agent following the season.

=== New York Mets ===
On February 10, 2020, Beckham agreed to a minor league contract with the San Diego Padres. He was released prior to the start of the season on March 14.

On June 29, 2020, Beckham signed a minor league contract with the New York Mets. He did not play in a game for the organization due to the cancellation of the minor league season because of the COVID-19 pandemic. Beckham was released by the Mets organization on July 22.

On January 27, 2022, Beckham retired from professional baseball.

== Broadcasting career ==
Beckham began his television career in 2021, as an analyst for the Atlanta Braves postgame show for 12 games. He has also appeared on White Sox telecasts.

== Personal life ==
Beckham's father, James Gordon Beckham Jr., played quarterback for the University of South Carolina. His mother also attended the University of South Carolina, where she was a cheerleader for both football and basketball. Gordon has two younger sisters, Gwen, and Grace.

Beckham was an honorary member of the Chi Phi Fraternity while attending the University of Georgia.

Beckham announced via Twitter in December 2012 that he was engaged to Brittany Fletcher, the daughter of Scott Fletcher. They married on November 9, 2013.. Sportscaster Brooke Fletcher is his sister-in-law, making her husband Jake Cronenworth Beckham's brother-in-law.

Preceded by Evan Longoria	Topps Rookie All-Star Third Baseman; 2009	Succeeded by Danny Valencia
Preceded by Evan Longoria	Sporting News AL Rookie of the Year; 2009	Succeeded by Austin Jackson
