= Middleton High School (Idaho) =

Coordinates: 43.705°N 116.630°W

- 1538 Emmett Road; Middleton, Idaho; United States

Information
- Type: Public
- School district: Middleton S.D. (#134)
- Principal: Johnny Hullinger
- Teaching staff: 63.58 (FTE)
- Grades: 9–12
- Enrollment: 1,392 (2023-2024)
- Student to teacher ratio: 21.89
- Colors: Blue and gold
- Athletics: IHSAA Class 5A
- Athletics conference: Southern Idaho (5A) (SIC)
- Mascot: Viking
- Feeder schools: Middleton Middle School
- Elevation: 2,395 feet (730 m) AMSL
- Website: Middleton High School

Middleton High School is a four-year public secondary school in Middleton, Idaho, United States, the only traditional high school in Middleton School District #134.

The district includes almost all of Middleton and the majority of the Canyon County portion of Star.

== Middleton High School fire ==
On the morning of February 1, 2007, the school caught fire as a result of the boiler exploding. Seventy percent of the school was ruined, with the damages assessed at $10 million. The 42-year-old school was full of trophies, plaques, memorabilia, and photographs. The band room alone contained $200,000 in instruments, including the associated middle school's instruments. The fire did not result in any deaths.

== Rebuild after fire ==
Construction on the new Middleton High School was completed in July 2008. The school reopened with seventeen teaching stations, a reduction of two classrooms, with the money saved used for improvements to the library, music room, and band room and upgrades throughout the building.

== New school and location ==
The district chose the 60-acre (240,000 m^{2}) site for the new high school on the southeast corner of Willis and Emmett Roads and purchased it at $10,000 per acre, thus making the entire purchase cost $600,000. In fall of 2011 classes began at the newly constructed 254,000-square-foot (23,600 m^{2}), two-story high school. Located approximately 2 1/2 miles from the old high school, the new facility is nearly five times the size of the old building. The new facility includes many tech, safety, and athletic additions to improve functionality. The new facility includes 34 classrooms (14 of which are unused), each with its own dedicated smart board, projector, and panic buttons. One hundred and ten security cameras adorn the 60-acre campus inside and out. The main entrance to the building features a "safety door" which makes guests check in through a window before being buzzed into the building.

The newly built school includes a new fine arts center with a 900-seat auditorium, which includes full lighting, sound, and an orchestra pit. The choir, orchestra, and band rooms were all built to specifically enhance the quality and clarity of the music being played.

When designing the new facility administrators choose to also greatly enhance the athletics facilities, in hopes to host tournaments, championships, and meet-ups. The new two-story, 3,000-seat gym features a full-size regulatory basketball court with two auxiliary courts located on the second floor behind the set of bleachers. The entire gym is encircled by a second-story, three-lane track totaling a quarter of a mile. The football stadium has the capacity to hold 4,000 spectators with press boxes adorning either side of the field. Instead of grass, the field is artificial turf with the school, logo and name. Both the softball and baseball fields feature pro-style recessed dugout with net backstops. A full-sized soccer field is surrounded by berm-style seating and a press box. The new campus also features eight full-sized tennis courts.

In addition to the main two-story building, there is also a separate Vo-ag education center. This building features classrooms built for wood shop, metal shop, engine repair, and a greenhouse.

In addition to the 2,000-student capacity, the campus has nearly 1,300 parking spots.

== Bands ==
Middleton has three bands: jazz band, concert band, and marching band. The jazz band plays various jazz works and rock/pop songs. The concert band plays classical music pieces and performs for Halloween and Christmas concerts, then a festival concert in the spring, and also performs at all home girls'/boys' basketball games under the pep band. The marching band was formed in 2004 and has played music from Pirates of the Caribbean, The Incredibles, Grease, and Rise From The Ashes. The 2008 show was titled Chicago On Broadway, and the 2009 show was Fantasmic. In the fire of 2007, all of the music that had been collected for many years and all the instruments were destroyed.

== Athletics ==
Middleton competes in athletics in IHSAA Class 5A in the Southern Idaho Conference.

=== State titles ===
Boys

- Soccer (1): fall (3A) 2005 (introduced in 2000)
- Basketball (2): (A-3, now 2A) 1965, (4A)2021
- Golf (7): (B) 1976, 1977, 1986, 1987, 1991, 1992, 1993 (introduced in 1956)

Girls

- Volleyball (1): fall (3A) 2005 (introduced in 1976)
- Basketball (5): (4A) 2008, 2010, 2011, 2012, 2017 (introduced in 1976)
- Softball (3): (3A) 2004, 2005, (4A) 2016 (introduced in 1997)
- Track (1): (3A) 2006 (introduced in 1971)
- Golf (1): (4A) 2009 (introduced in 1987)

== Notable alumni ==
- Carlos Trujillo, long-distance runner
- Melinda Smyser, Idaho politician
