= 2009 Toronto Blue Jays season =

2009 Toronto Blue Jays
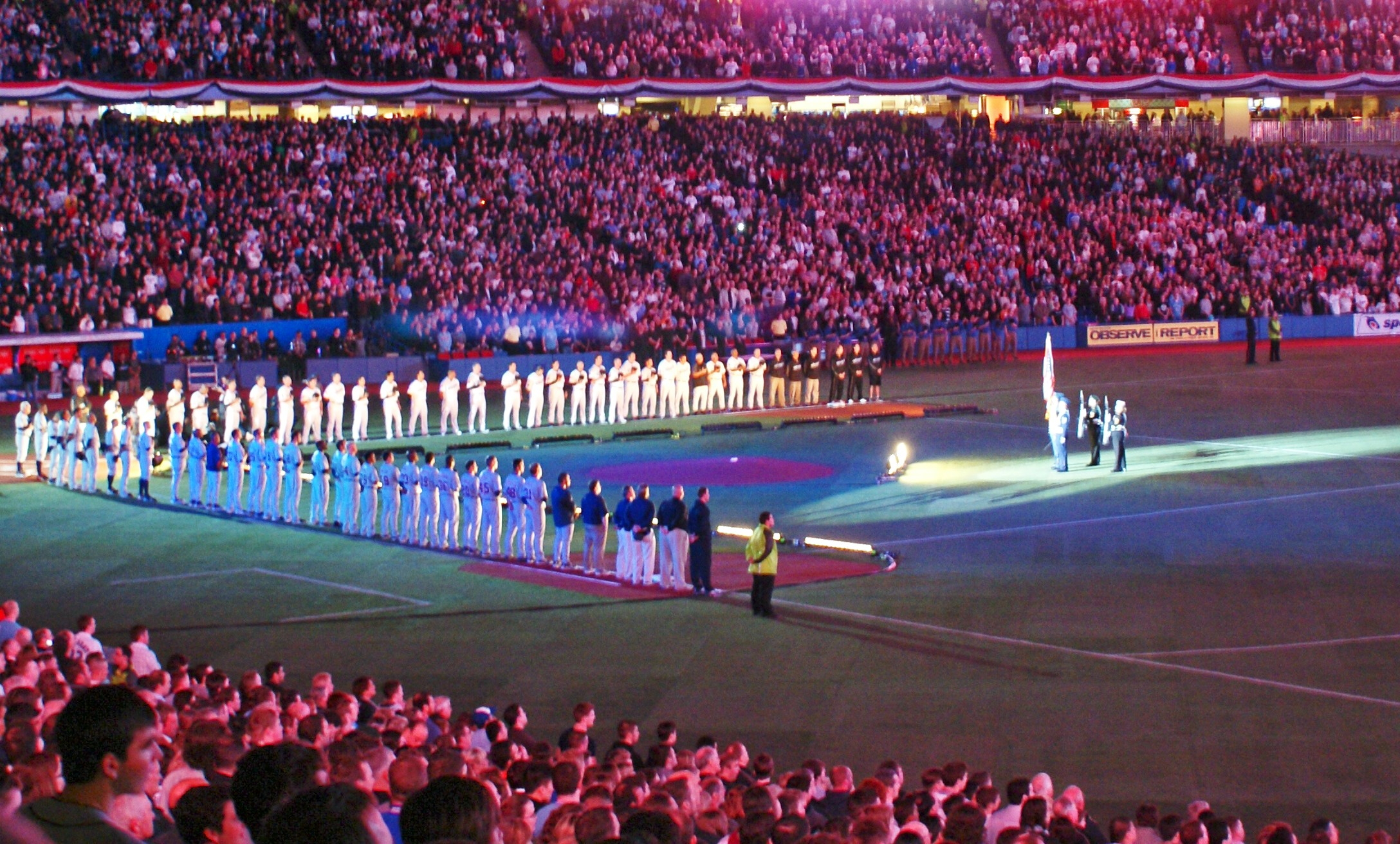
- Singing of the national anthem during the Opening Day ceremony
- League: American League
- Division: East
- Ballpark: Rogers Centre
- City: Toronto, Ontario
- Record: 75–87 (.463)
- Divisional place: 4th
- Owners: Rogers; Paul Beeston (CEO)
- General managers: J. P. Ricciardi
- Managers: Cito Gaston
- Television: TSN, TSN2 (Rod Black, Pat Tabler); Rogers Sportsnet (Jamie Campbell, Pat Tabler, Rance Mulliniks, Darrin Fletcher)
- Radio: FAN 590 (Jerry Howarth, Alan Ashby, Mike Wilner)

The 2009 Toronto Blue Jays season was the franchise's 33rd in Major League Baseball, and the 20th full season of play at the Rogers Centre. The team was managed by Cito Gaston, who was hired by the team midway through the 2008 season. The team finished with a 75–87 record; their first losing season since 2005. General manager J. P. Ricciardi was fired on the penultimate day of the season, as the team again failed to make the playoffs. He was replaced by Assistant General Manager Alex Anthopoulos.

== Front office reorganization ==
Ted Rogers, the founder of Rogers Communications and the Blue Jays' owner, died at the age of 75 on December 2, 2008, at his home in Toronto. Rogers purchased the Blue Jays in 2000, hoping to lead the franchise to its first playoff berth since the club last won the World Series in 1993. The team continues to be owned and operated by Rogers Blue Jays Baseball Partnership, a division of Rogers Communications.

Prior to Rogers' death, the team named Paul Beeston as interim president of baseball operations and chief operating officer replacing retiring president Paul Godfrey. The first employee in Toronto Blue Jays history, Beeston served in the same capacity with the organization from 1989 to 1997. Soon after being introduced on October 14, 2008, Beeston began a significant reorganization of the baseball operations of the club. Due to the 2008 financial crisis and the loss of advertising revenue, the team laid off several employees from its media division on December 2.

On January 21, 2009, assistant general manager Bart Given was also dismissed to keep "costs down" for the upcoming season according to the team.

Additions were made to the scouting department, including the hiring of pro scouts Roy Smith, Steve Springer and four others.

== Player transactions ==
The most significant change from the 2008 team was the departure of pitcher A. J. Burnett, who filed for free agency and signed a contract with the New York Yankees. Shaun Marcum (elbow), Casey Janssen (shoulder) and Dustin McGowan (labrum) started the season on the disabled list. Janssen has since returned, Getting a loss in his season debut vs the Braves, which the Jays lost 4–3.

=== Retentions ===
For the twelfth consecutive season the organization avoided going to an arbitration hearing, re-signing the five arbitration eligible players on the team. The team and relievers Brandon League (one year/$640K), Jeremy Accardo (one year/$900K), Jason Frasor (one year/$1.45M), Brian Tallet (one year/$1.025M) and Shawn Camp (one year/$750K) along with infielder José Bautista (one year/$2.4M) all came to terms.

The team also picked up the club option held on catcher Rod Barajas.

=== Departures ===
On November 5, 2008, pitcher A. J. Burnett opted out of the remaining two years of his five-year contract, ending months of speculation that the starter was planning to leave Toronto. Burnett, who in 2008 led the team in strikeouts and won 18 games, went on to sign with the division rival New York Yankees on December 18.

None of the five major league free agents from the Blue Jays' 2008 roster were tendered contracts. Catcher Gregg Zaun ended his five-year tenure in Toronto and signed a one-year deal with the rival Baltimore Orioles. Outfielder Brad Wilkerson (Boston), relief pitcher John Parrish (Orioles), and infielder Héctor Luna (Los Angeles (NL)) all signed minor league contracts elsewhere, while outfielder Kevin Mench signed a one-year deal with the Hanshin Tigers of Japan's Nippon League.

Minor league pitching prospect Jean Machi, who had been on the forty-man roster, was also released by the club in November. Another major departure, third baseman Scott Rolen, was traded to the Cincinnati Reds for personal reasons.

=== Arrivals ===
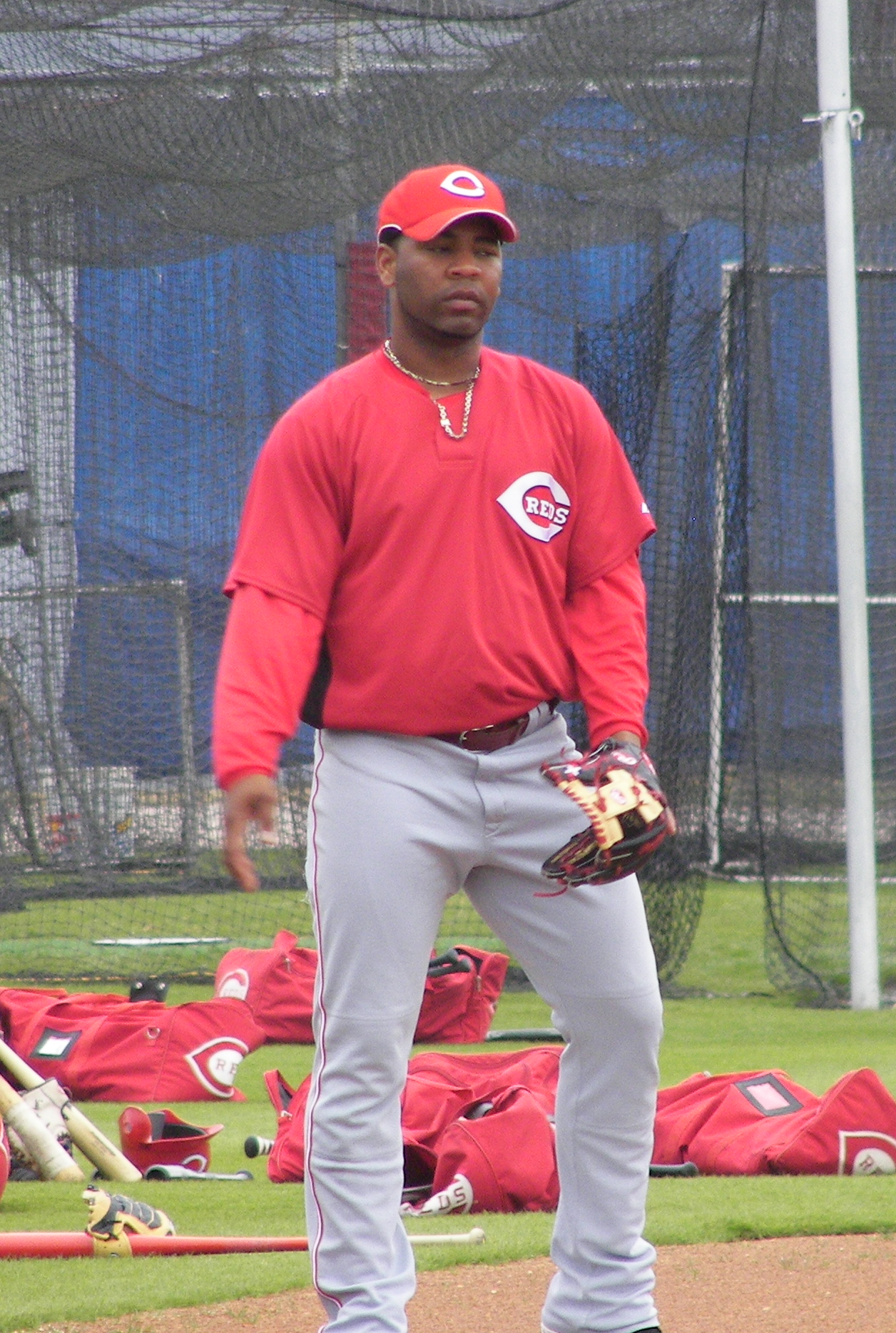
Edwin Encarnación was acquired on the trade deadline in a deal with the Cincinnati Reds.

The Blue Jays, faced with financial hardships, the fall of the Canadian dollar against the American dollar and a smaller budget, did not opt to make any major impact moves. Towards the end of spring training, they did however sign Kevin Millar to a one-year deal. Millar is known as a solid player to have in the clubhouse and would find time playing the DH and utility infield.

However, with the trade of Scott Rolen to the Cincinnati Reds, the Blue Jays welcomed infielder Edwin Encarnación, relief pitcher Josh Roenicke and a minor league pitching prospect.

==== Pitchers ====
Two starters recovering from major shoulder surgery would have an opportunity to claim rotation slots with the club coming out of spring training. Former All-Star starter Matt Clement, who spent an injury riddled 2008 season with St. Louis was signed on December 12. Left-handed starter Mike Maroth, who last pitched in the majors in 2007 with St. Louis, was inked to a minor league deal on December 30.

Two former first overall draft picks were also acquired by the club. 2002 top selection Bryan Bullington was claimed off waivers from Cleveland in October. The Jays also traded for 2004 number one choice Matt Bush in February. Bush had previously been in the Padres organisation.

The team imported fourteen-year Nippon League veteran Ken Takahashi from Japan. Toronto claimed southpaw Brian Burres (Baltimore), and reliever T. J. Beam (Pittsburgh) off waivers. The club also re-signed Dirk Hayhurst in February, days after releasing the former waiver claim.

==== Position players ====
Former silver slugging catcher Michael Barrett and infielder Kevin Millar were among the prominent additions to the team offensively. Barrett, who missed much of his 2008 season with the Padres due to a facial fracture, is a top candidate to be the Blue Jays backup catcher. Millar, who spent the previous three seasons with Baltimore and hit twenty home runs in 2008, will have an opportunity for a bench or platoon role with the Jays.

In January, the team signed outfielder Jason Lane (Boston) and infielder Brandon Fahey (Baltimore) to minor league deals. In December, the team inked catcher Raúl Chávez (Pittsburgh) and designated hitter Randy Ruiz (Minnesota). In October the club announced it signed former Orioles pitcher Adam Loewen and will attempt to convert him to a first baseman.

=== Injuries ===
Starter Shaun Marcum was lost for the 2009 season when he underwent Tommy John surgery in the fall of 2008. The right-hander went under the knife to repair ligaments in his pitching elbow, and is tentatively expected to be back for the Jays' 2010 spring training.

Pitcher Casey Janssen who missed all of 2008 due to shoulder problems was expected to compete for a rotation spot, but was put on the 15-day disabled list just before the season began. Starter Dustin McGowan who is recovering from right labrum surgery is expected to rejoin the club sometime in May.

On April 23, the Blue Jays placed starting pitcher Ricky Romero and closer B. J. Ryan on the 15-day disabled list. Romero was suffering from a right oblique strain, while Ryan was sent to see a specialist for a tight left trapezius muscle. Ryan has since returned, but not as the closer.

On June 9, it was announced that Jesse Litsch will undergo season-ending ligament replacement ("Tommy John") surgery.

== Broadcasts ==
The Jays' flagship station for radio is The FAN 590, which has all 162 regular season games. Jerry Howarth and Alan Ashby will call all 162, with Mike Wilner being the third personality. Mike will also host the pregame and postgame show for each game, as long as there is time for it before/after. The Blue Jays' flagship TV station is Rogers Sportsnet, which is airing over 100 games in 2009 for the Jays. The two other stations are both in the TSN network, TSN and TSN2. TSN has coverage starting after they are done with NHL on TSN (during the Stanley Cup Finals, coverage usually starts). From May 19–21, the two Jays stations were occupied with hockey and TSN2 airs the Jays in TSN's place. With Sportsnet taking care of the annual Memorial Cup, and TSN covering the NHL conference finals, TSN2 was open, and took in at the time, the biggest series of the Jays' young season. Rod Black and Pat Tabler did not cover this series though, TSN2 broadcast NESN coverage. TSN2 had the September 13 game versus the Tigers and will air the Jays home closer versus the Mariners on September 27. Untelevised games can be seen on JaysVision on Rogers Cable (digital only). Otherwise, the viewer must subscribe to MLB Extra Innings, which gets the feed from the opposing team's station. MLB Extra Innings is available on satellite and digital cable.

== Regular season ==
=== Season summary ===
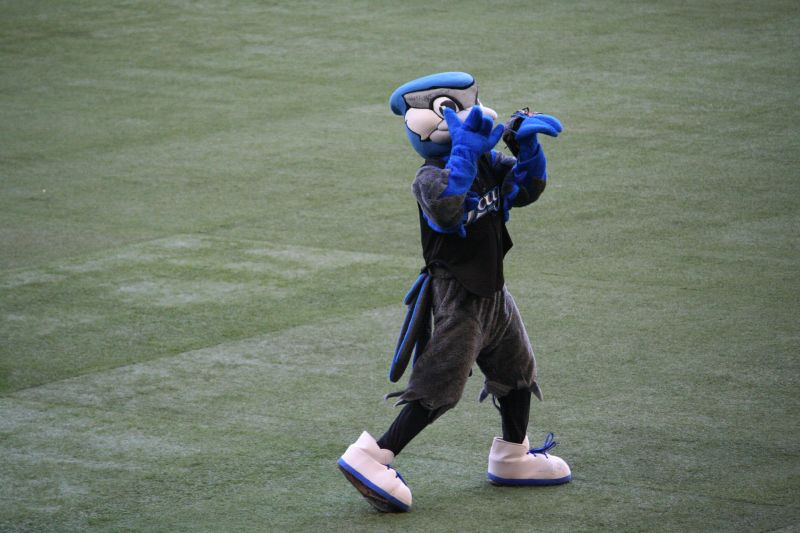
The Blue Jays mascot during the 2009 season

The Jays began the year with a schedule that had them playing teams from the Central and the West divisions for 24 games in April. Adam Lind slugged out an opening day record 6 RBI, and the Jays pummeled the Tigers, giving Roy Halladay the win. They went on to win the first 6 series of the season, and finished April with a 15–9 record, tied with the Red Sox for first in the AL East.

The first game against the New York Yankees occurred on May 12, in a marquee matchup of Roy Halladay versus former teammate A. J. Burnett. Not only did the Jays win 8–2, but Halladay recorded his first complete game of the season, while giving Burnett his first loss on the year. The Jays drew a crowd of 43,737 fans. This was the first non-home opener Rogers Centre sell out since July 22 of the previous year against the Yankees, drawing a crowd of 50,014. However, the remaining two games of the 2009series were won by the Yankees, making this the first series lost by the Jays at home that season. They followed this with a series sweep of the Chicago White Sox, at which time the Jays had the best record (27–14) in the American League, but this was followed by a disastrous road trip to Boston, Atlanta and Baltimore during which the Jays lost 9 straight games, tying their longest away-game losing streak since a nine-game run in May 2007. This left the Jays at 27–23, behind Boston and the Yankees by 1.5 games. The Blue Jays then bounced back, taking two out of three from Boston, and had some more considerable successes, most notably a three-game road sweep of the Philadelphia Phillies. However, they never again held a playoff position, and gradually faded out of the picture: they were out of contention by the All-Star break, and were never able to mount any sort of charge reminiscent of 2008's 10-game winning streak to get back in the race.

Roy Halladay and Aaron Hill were named to the American League All-Star team. Halladay was the starting pitcher, and Hill started the game at second base.

=== Firing of J. P. Ricciardi ===
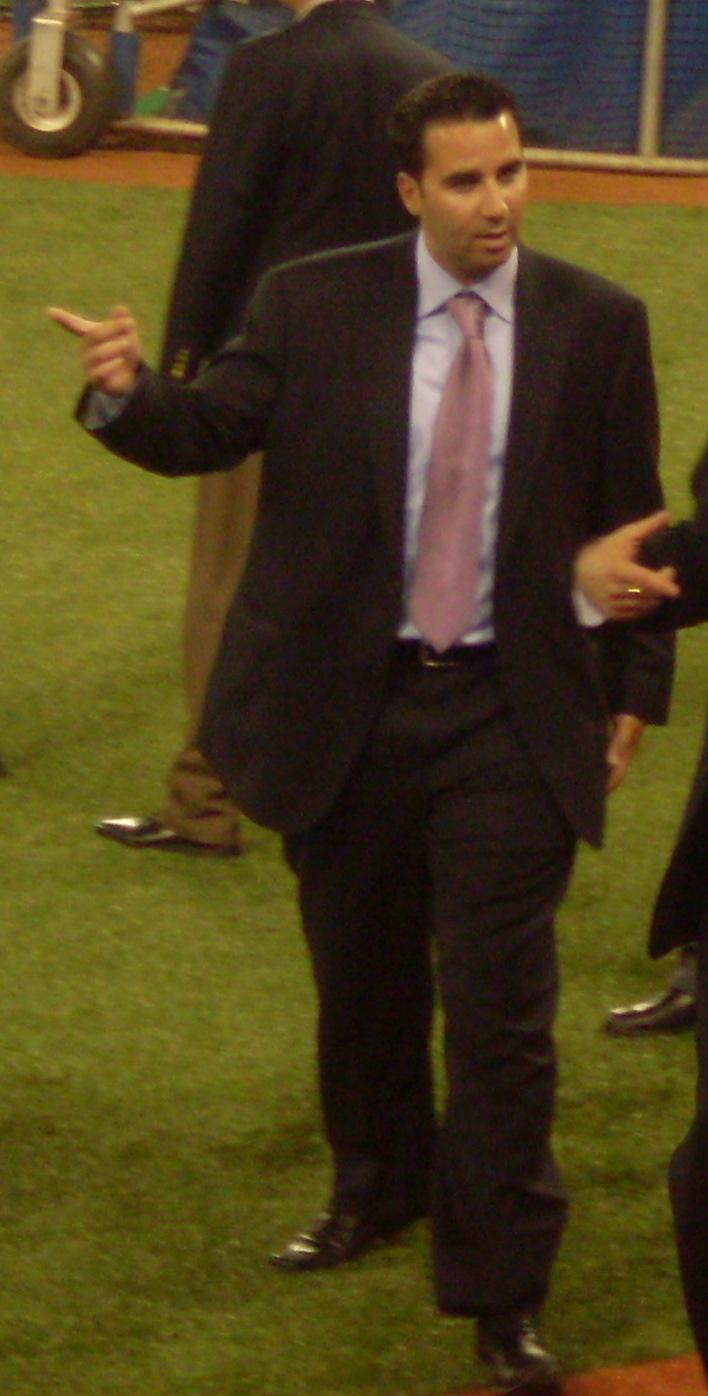
Alex Anthopoulos took over for J. P. Ricciardi.

On October 3, the J. P. Ricciardi era ended in Toronto. When he took over in 2002, he guaranteed a playoff berth; the Jays never even came close to a playoff berth, never finishing better than 10 games behind the top of the division during Ricciardi's reign. After a promising start to 2009, the Jays faltered, and Ricciardi publicized the topic of a Roy Halladay trade, which many Jays fans disapproved. Allegedly, Ricciardi told Ken Rosenthal of Fox Sports a day before the firing, in which some Blue Jays players spoke critically about Cito Gaston. A day later, Paul Beeston reportedly found out about Ricciardi leaking the information to the media, and promptly fired him. Assistant GM Alex Anthopoulos took over immediately.

=== Season standings ===
==== AL East ====
AL East
Team	W	L	Pct.	GB	Home	Road
New York Yankees	103	59	.636	—	57‍–‍24	46‍–‍35
Boston Red Sox	95	67	.586	8	56‍–‍25	39‍–‍42
Tampa Bay Rays	84	78	.519	19	52‍–‍29	32‍–‍49
Toronto Blue Jays	75	87	.463	28	44‍–‍37	31‍–‍50
Baltimore Orioles	64	98	.395	39	39‍–‍42	25‍–‍56

=== Detailed record ===
Team	Home	Away	Total	Gms left
AL East
Baltimore Orioles	8-1	1-8	9-9	-
Boston Red Sox	4-5	3-6	7-11	-
New York Yankees	3-6	3-6	6-12	-
Tampa Bay Rays	3-6	1-8	4-14	-
	18-18	8-28	26-46	-
AL Central
Chicago White Sox	4-0	2-1	6-1	-
Cleveland Indians	2-3	2-1	4-4	-
Detroit Tigers	3-1	2-2	5-3	-
Kansas City Royals	2-1	1-3	3-4	-
Minnesota Twins	2-2	3-1	5-3	-
	13-7	10-8	23-15	-
AL West
Los Angeles Angels	3-3	1-1	4-4	-
Oakland Athletics	2-1	4-2	6-3	-
Seattle Mariners	3-1	1-2	4-3	-
Texas Rangers	2-1	3-4	5-5	-
	10-6	9-9	19-15	-
National League
Atlanta Braves	N/A	0-3	0-3	-
Cincinnati Reds	2-1	N/A	2-1	-
Florida Marlins	0-3	N/A	0-3	-
Philadelphia Phillies	1-2	3-0	4-2	-
Washington Nationals	N/A	1-2	1-2	-
	3-6	4-5	7-11	-

Month	Games	Won	Lost
April	24	15	9
May	29	14	15
June	26	12	14
July	24	8	16
August	26	10	16
September	30	16	14
October	3	0	3
	162	75	87

=== Vs. opponents ===
2009 American League record Source: MLB Standings Grid – 2009
Team	BAL	BOS	CWS	CLE	DET	KC	LAA	MIN	NYY	OAK	SEA	TB	TEX	TOR	NL
Baltimore	–	2–16	5–4	2–5	3–5	4–4	2–8	3–2	5–13	1–5	4–5	8–10	5–5	9–9	11–7
Boston	16–2	–	4–4	7–2	6–1	5–3	4–5	4–2	9–9	5–5	2–4	9–9	2–7	11–7	11–7
Chicago	4–5	4−4	–	10–8	9–9	9–9	5–4	6−12	3–4	4–5	4–5	6–2	2–4	1–6	12–6
Cleveland	5–2	2–7	8–10	–	4–14	10–8	2–4	8–10	3–5	2–5	6–4	5–3	1–8	4–4	5–13
Detroit	5–3	1–6	9–9	14–4	–	9–9	5–4	7–12	1–5	5–4	5–4	5–2	7–2	3–5	10–8
Kansas City	4–4	3–5	9–9	8–10	9–9	–	1–9	6–12	2–4	2–6	5–4	1–9	3–3	4–3	8–10
Los Angeles	8–2	5–4	4–5	4–2	4–5	9–1	–	6–4	5–5	12–7	10–9	4–2	8–11	4–4	14–4
Minnesota	2–3	2–4	12–6	10–8	12–7	12–6	4–6	–	0–7	4–6	5–5	3–3	6–4	3–5	12–6
New York	13–5	9–9	4–3	5–3	5–1	4–2	5–5	7–0	–	7–2	6–4	11–7	5–4	12–6	10–8
Oakland	5–1	5–5	5–4	5–2	4–5	6–2	7–12	6–4	2–7	–	5–14	6–4	11–8	3–6	5–13
Seattle	5–4	4–2	5–4	4–6	4–5	4–5	9–10	5–5	4–6	14–5	–	5–3	8–11	3–4	11–7
Tampa Bay	10–8	9–9	2–6	3–5	2–5	9–1	2–4	3–3	7–11	4–6	3–5	–	3–6	14–4	13–5
Texas	5–5	7–2	4–2	8–1	2–7	3–3	11–8	4–6	4–5	8–11	11–8	6–3	–	5–5	9–9
Toronto	9–9	7–11	6–1	4–4	5–3	3–4	4–4	5–3	6–12	6–3	4–3	4–14	5–5	–	7–11

- Source: MLB Standings Grid – 2009

=== 2009 draft picks ===
The 2009 MLB draft was held on June 9–11. The Blue Jays had a first round pick, along with one compensation pick. The Blue Jays also had two picks in the third round.

Round	Pick	Player	Position	College/school	Nationality	Signed
1	20	Chad Jenkins	RHP	Kennesaw State	(United States)	2009–08–15
C-A	37*	James Paxton	LHP	Kentucky	(Canada)	Unsigned
2	68	Jake Eliopoulos	LHP	Sacred Heart Catholic High School (ON)	(Canada)	Unsigned
3	99	Jake Barrett	RHP	Desert Ridge High School (AZ)	(United States)	Unsigned
3	104	Jake Marisnick	CF	Riverside Polytechnic High School (CA)	(United States)	2009–08–17
4	130	Ryan Goins	SS	Dallas Baptist	(United States)	2009–07–17
5	160	Ryan Schimpf	2B	Louisiana State	(United States)	2009–07–27
6	190	K. C. Hobson	RF	Stockdale High School (CA)	(United States)	2009–08–17
7	220	Egan Smith	LHP	College of Southern Nevada	(United States)	2009–06–14
8	250	Brian Slover	RHP	Cal State-Northridge	(United States)	2009–07–20
9	280	Aaron Loup	LHP	Tulane	(United States)	2009–06–29
10	310	Yan Gomes	C	Barry	(Brazil)	2009–06–19

- * The Blue Jays received the 37th pick as compensation for loss of free agent A. J. Burnett

=== Roster ===
2009 Toronto Blue Jays
Roster
Pitchers: 49 Jeremy Accardo; 36 Bryan Bullington; 14 Brian Burres; 57 Shawn Camp; 39 Jesse Carlson; 27 Brett Cecil; 37 Scott Downs; 54 Jason Frasor; 32 Roy Halladay; 58 Dirk Hayhurst; 44 Casey Janssen; 22 Brandon League; 51 Jesse Litsch; 59 Brad Mills; 62 Bill Murphy; 25 David Purcey; 60 Robert Ray; 48 Scott Richmond; 33 Josh Roenicke; 24 Ricky Romero; 52 B. J. Ryan; 34 Marc Rzepczynski; 56 Brian Tallet; 40 Brian Wolfe	Catchers: 20 Rod Barajas; 5 Michael Barrett; 13 Raúl Chávez; 31 Kyle Phillips; Infielders: 7 Edwin Encarnación; 2 Aaron Hill; 6 John McDonald; 15,30 Kevin Millar; 35 Lyle Overbay; 33 Scott Rolen; 3 Randy Ruiz; 19 Marco Scutaro	Outfielders: 8 Russ Adams; 23 José Bautista; 17 David Dellucci; 1 Joe Inglett; 26 Adam Lind; 15 Alex Ríos; 45 Travis Snider; 10 Vernon Wells	Manager: 43 Cito Gaston; Coaches: 38 Brad Arnsberg (pitching); 55 Brian Butterfield (bench); 16 Nick Leyva (third base); 41 Dwayne Murphy (first base); 18 Gene Tenace (hitting); 53 Bruce Walton (bullpen)

== Game log ==
Legend
Blue Jays win	Blue Jays loss	Game postponed

Game log
April 15–9 (home 7–3, road 8–6)

#	Date	Opponent	Score	Win	Loss	Save	Attendance	Record	GB
1	April 6	Tigers	12–5	Halladay (1–0)	Verlander (0–1)		48,027	1–0	0
2	April 7	Tigers	5–4	Ryan (1–0)	Lyon (0–1)		16,790	2–0	+½
3	April 8	Tigers	5–1	Miner (1–0)	Litsch (0–1)		12,145	2–1	½
4	April 9	Tigers	6–2	Romero (1–0)	Porcello (0–1)		15,297	3–1	+½
5	April 10	@ Indians	13–7	League (1–0)	Pérez (0–1)		42,473	4–1	+½
6	April 11	@ Indians	5–4	Halladay (2–0)	Lee (0–2)	Frasor (1)	20,895	5–1	+½
7	April 12	@ Indians	8–4	Reyes (1–0)	Purcey (0–1)		14,216	5–2	+½
8	April 13	@ Twins	8–6	Frasor (1–0)	Ayala (1–1)	Ryan (1)	16,410	6–2	+½
9	April 14	@ Twins	3–2 (11)	Crain (1–0)	Carlson (0–1)		15,375	6–3	½
10	April 15	@ Twins	12–2	Richmond (1–0)	Baker (0–1)		19,471	7–3	+½
11	April 16	@ Twins	9–2	Halladay (3–0)	Liriano (0–3)		15,169	8–3	+1
12	April 17	Athletics	8–5	Bailey (2–0)	League (1–1)	Ziegler (3)	18,272	8–4	+1
13	April 18	Athletics	4–2 (12)	Frasor (2–0)	Giese (0–1)		21,698	9–4	+2
14	April 19	Athletics	1–0	Romero (2–0)	Braden (1–2)	Ryan (2)	22,164	10–4	+2½
15	April 21	Rangers	5–4	McCarthy (2–0)	Halladay (3–1)	Francisco (2)	20,996	10–5	+1½
16	April 22	Rangers	8–7 (11)	Frasor (3–0)	Wilson (0–2)		13,090	11–5	+1½
17	April 23	Rangers	5–2	Richmond (2–0)	Millwood (1–2)	Downs (1)	15,487	12–5	+2
18	April 24	@ White Sox	14–0	Tallet (1–0)	Floyd (2–2)		27,103	13–5	+2
19	April 25	@ White Sox	10–2	Buehrle (3–0)	Burres (0–1)		30,383	13–6	+1
20	April 26	@ White Sox	4–3	Halladay (4–1)	Linebrink (0–1)	Downs (2)	31,459	14–6	+1
21	April 27	@ Royals	7–1	Bannister (2–0)	Purcey (0–2)		9,685	14–7	0
22	April 28	@ Royals	8–1	Richmond (3–0)	Meche (1–2)		15,191	15–7	+1
23	April 29	@ Royals	11–3	Greinke (5–0)	Tallet (1–1)		10,619	15–8	0
24	April 30	@ Royals	8–6	Davies (2–1)	Burres (0–2)		11,896	15–9	0

May 14–15 (home 11–4, road 3–11)

#	Date	Opponent	Score	Win	Loss	Save	Attendance	Record	GB
25	May 1	Orioles	8–4	Halladay (5–1)	Hendrickson (1–4)		20,020	16–9	+1
26	May 2	Orioles	5–4 (11)	Frasor (4–0)	Bass (0–1)		18,331	17–9	+1
27	May 3	Orioles	4–3	Richmond (4–0)	Guthrie (2–2)	Downs (3)	20,418	18–9	+2
28	May 4	Indians	9–7 (12)	Betancourt (1–1)	Camp (0–1)	Lewis (1)	15,295	18–10	+1
29	May 5	Indians	10–6	Wolfe (1–0)	Chulk (0–1)		22,005	19–10	+1
30	May 6	@ Angels	13–1	Halladay (6–1)	Ortega (0–2)		41,123	20–10	+2
31	May 7	@ Angels	6–1	Weaver (3–1)	Ray (0–1)		41,007	20–11	+1
32	May 8	@ Athletics	5–3	Wuertz (2–1)	Richmond (4–1)	Bailey (1)	14,103	20–12	0
33	May 9	@ Athletics	6–4	Tallet (2–1)	Gallagher (1–1)		15,817	21–12	+1
34	May 10	@ Athletics	5–0	Cecil (1–0)	Braden (3–4)		15,126	22–12	+1
35	May 12	Yankees	5–1	Halladay (7–1)	Burnett (2–1)		43,737	23–12	+1
36	May 13	Yankees	8–2	Pettitte (3–1)	Richmond (4–2)		20,164	23–13	+1
37	May 14	Yankees	3–2	Sabathia (3–3)	Carlson (0–2)	Rivera (7)	22,667	23–14	+1
38	May 15	White Sox	8–3	Cecil (2–0)	Danks (2–3)		17,241	24–14	+2
39	May 16	White Sox	2–1	Ray (1–1)	Linebrink (1–2)	Downs (4)	21,879	25–14	+2
40	May 17	White Sox	8–2	Halladay (8–1)	Floyd (2–4)		37,137	26–14	+3
41	May 18	White Sox	3–2	Carlson (1–2)	Dotel (1–1)	Downs (5)	24,206	27–14	+3½
42	May 19	@ Red Sox	2–1	Wakefield (5–2)	Tallet (2–2)	Papelbon (11)	37,830	27–15	+2½
43	May 20	@ Red Sox	8–3	Penny (4–1)	Cecil (2–1)		38,099	27–16	+1½
44	May 21	@ Red Sox	5–1	Lester (3–4)	Ray (1–2)		38,347	27–17	+½
45	May 22	@ Braves	1–0	Kawakami (3–5)	Carlson (1–3)	González (7)	21,533	27–18	+½
46	May 23	@ Braves	4–3	Lowe (6–2)	Janssen (0–1)	Soriano (4)	27,377	27–19	+½
47	May 24	@ Braves	10–2	Bennett (2–1)	Camp (0–2)		23,971	27–20	½
48	May 25	@ Orioles	4–1	Guthrie (4–4)	Tallet (2–3)	Sherrill (10)	24,904	27–21	1½
49	May 26	@ Orioles	7–2	Berken (1–0)	Romero (2–1)		10,130	27–22	1½
50	May 27	@ Orioles	12–10 (11)	Báez (4–1)	Wolfe (1–1)		13,713	27–23	1½
51	May 29	Red Sox	6–3	Janssen (1–1)	Wakefield (6–3)	Downs (6)	32,026	28–23	1½
52	May 30	Red Sox	5–3	Tallet (3–3)	Ramírez (4–2)	Downs (7)	35,484	29–23	1½
53	May 31	Red Sox	8–2	Lester (4–5)	Romero (2–2)		30,496	29–24	1½

June 12–14 (home 6–11, road 6–3)

#	Date	Opponent	Score	Win	Loss	Save	Attendance	Record	GB
54	June 2	Angels	6–4	Halladay (9–1)	Saunders (6–4)		26,809	30–24	2
55	June 3	Angels	8–1	Weaver (5–2)	Janssen (1–2)		17,127	30–25	2
56	June 4	Angels	6–5	Speier (2–1)	League (1–2)		31,163	30–26	3
57	June 5	Royals	9–3	Romero (3–2)	Greinke (8–2)		15,435	31–26	2½
58	June 6	Royals	6–2	Hochevar (1–2)	Richmond (4–3)		16,552	31–27	3
59	June 7	Royals	4–0	Halladay (10–1)	Davies (2–6)		21,071	32–27	2½
60	June 8	@ Rangers	6–3	Janssen (2–2)	Feldman (5–1)	Downs (8)	17,856	33–27	2½
61	June 9	@ Rangers	9–0	Tallet (4–3)	Mathis (0–1)		17,535	34–27	1½
–	June 10	@ Rangers	Postponed (rain) Rescheduled for September 1						2
62	June 11	@ Rangers	1–0	Millwood (6–4)	Romero (3–3)	Wilson (6)	16,073	34–28	3
63	June 12	Marlins	7–3	Meyer (1–0)	League (1–3)		17,922	34–29	4
64	June 13	Marlins	6–5	West (2–1)	Janssen (2–3)	Lindstrom (12)	20,634	34–30	5
65	June 14	Marlins	11–3	Johnson (6–1)	Tallet (4–4)		20,985	34–31	5
66	June 16	@ Phillies	8–3 (10)	Downs (1–0)	Condrey (4–2)		44,958	35–31	5
67	June 17	@ Phillies	7–1	Richmond (5–3)	Moyer (4–6)		42,091	36–31	5
68	June 18	@ Phillies	8–7	Frasor (5–0)	Madson (2–2)	Accardo (1)	44,036	37–31	4
69	June 19	@ Nationals	2–1 (11)	Colomé (1–0)	Frasor (5–1)		20,860	37–32	4
70	June 20	@ Nationals	5–3 (12)	Tavárez (3–4)	Richmond (5–4)		22,142	37–33	5
71	June 21	@ Nationals	9–4	Romero (4–3)	Martis (5–2)		26,610	38–33	5
72	June 23	Reds	7–5	Tallet (5–4)	Owings (4–8)	Frasor (2)	30,351	39–33	5
73	June 24	Reds	8–2	Richmond (6–4)	Arroyo (8–6)		15,409	40–33	5
74	June 25	Reds	7–5	Cueto (6–4)	Camp (0–3)	Cordero (18)	15,329	40–34	5
75	June 26	Phillies	6–1	Romero (5–3)	Hamels (4–4)		21,331	41–34	5
76	June 27	Phillies	10–0	Happ (5–0)	Mills (0–1)		28,805	41–35	6
77	June 28	Phillies	5–4	Moyer (6–6)	Tallet (5–5)	Lidge (14)	36,378	41–36	6
78	June 29	Rays	4–1	Niemann (7–4)	Halladay (10–2)	Choate (4)	15,665	41–37	7
79	June 30	Rays	4–1	Garza (6–5)	Richmond (6–5)	Howell (6)	15,477	41–38	7

July 8–16 (home 5–5, road 3–11)

#	Date	Opponent	Score	Win	Loss	Save	Attendance	Record	GB
80	July 1	Rays	5–0	Romero (6–3)	Shields (6–6)		30,533	42–38	7
81	July 3	@ Yankees	4–2	Burnett (7–4)	Tallet (5–6)	Rivera (21)	46,308	42–39	7
82	July 4	@ Yankees	6–5 (12)	Tomko (1–2)	Camp (0–4)		46,620	42–40	7
83	July 5	@ Yankees	10–8	Albaladejo (3–1)	Ryan (1–1)	Aceves (1)	46,320	42–41	8
84	July 6	@ Yankees	7–6	Romero (7–3)	Pettitte (8–4)	Frasor (3)	46,450	43–41	7
85	July 7	@ Rays	3–1 (11)	Wheeler (3–1)	League (1–4)		15,244	43–42	8
86	July 8	@ Rays	10–9	Howell (5–2)	Frasor (5–2)		15,252	43–43	9
87	July 9	@ Rays	3–2	Price (3–3)	Halladay (10–3)	Wheeler (1)	25,749	43–44	9
88	July 10	@ Orioles	2–0	Cecil (3–1)	Berken (1–6)	Downs (9)	30,574	44–44	9
89	July 11	@ Orioles	4–3 (12)	Hendrickson (5–4)	Carlson (1–4)		28,281	44–45	10
90	July 12	@ Orioles	4–2	Bergesen (6–3)	Rzepczynski (0–1)	Sherrill (20)	21,621	44–46	11
91	July 17	Red Sox	4–1	Buchholz (1–0)	Romero (7–4)	Papelbon (24)	32,928	44–47	12
92	July 18	Red Sox	6–2	Rzepczynski (1–1)	Penny (6–4)		36,926	45–47	11
93	July 19	Red Sox	3–1	Halladay (11–3)	Lester (8–7)		36,534	46–47	10
94	July 21	Indians	2–1	Lee (6–9)	Downs(1–1)		18,330	46–48	10½
95	July 22	Indians	10–6	Romero (8–4)	Pavano (8–8)		18,375	47–48	10½
96	July 23	Indians	5–4	Huff (5–4)	Rzepczynski (1–2)	Wood (13)	32,061	47–49	11½
97	July 24	Rays	4–2	Garza (7–7)	Downs (1–2)	Howell (11)	24,161	47–50	12½
98	July 25	Rays	10–9 (12)	Howell (6–2)	Camp (0–5)	Nelson (3)	26,527	47–51	12½
99	July 26	Rays	5–1	Cecil (4–1)	Niemann (9–5)		30,610	48–51	12½
100	July 27	@ Mariners	11–4	Romero (9–4)	Hernández (11–4)		28,696	49–51	12½
101	July 28	@ Mariners	4–3	Aardsma (3–3)	Downs (1–3)		26,148	49–52	12½
102	July 29	@ Mariners	3–2	Rowland-Smith (1–1)	Halladay (11–4)	Aardsma (25)	32,649	49–53	13½
103	July 31	@ Athletics	8–5	Braden (8–9)	Richmond (6–6)	Bailey (14)	12,151	49–54	13

August 10–16 (home 5–9, road 5–7)

#	Date	Opponent	Score	Win	Loss	Save	Attendance	Record	GB
104	August 1	@ Athletics	6–5	Cecil (5–1)	Cahill (6–10)	Frasor (4)	35,067	50–54	12
105	August 2	@ Athletics	7–2	Romero (10–4)	Mazzaro (2–8)		13,070	51–54	12
106	August 4	Yankees	5–3	Pettitte (9–6)	Halladay (11–5)		33,669	51–55	13
107	August 5	Yankees	8–4	Aceves (7–1)	Rzepczynski (1–3)		31,402	51–56	14
108	August 7	Orioles	7–5	Berken (2–9)	Romero (10–5)	Johnson (3)	30,795	51–57	15½
109	August 8	Orioles	3–2 (10)	Frasor (6–2)	Báez (4–6)		28,613	52–57	16½
110	August 9	Orioles	7–3	Halladay (12–5)	Matusz (1–1)		27,464	53–57	15½
111	August 10	@ Yankees	5–4	Camp (1–5)	Mitre (1–1)	Frasor (5)	46,376	54–57	14½
112	August 11	@ Yankees	7–5	Robertson (2–1)	Carlson (1–5)	Rivera (33)	46,523	54–58	15½
113	August 12	@ Yankees	4–3	Gaudin (5–10)	Camp (1–6)		47,113	54–59	16½
114	August 14	@ Rays	5–2	Halladay (13–5)	Shields (7–9)	Frasor (6)	21,522	55–59	17
115	August 15	@ Rays	8–3	Kazmir (7–7)	Tallet (5–7)		29,632	55–60	18
116	August 16	@ Rays	5–2	Wheeler (4–3)	League (1–5)		24,625	55–61	18½
117	August 18	Red Sox	10–9	Okajima (4–0)	Janssen (2–4)	Papelbon (29)	25,472	55–62	18½
118	August 19	Red Sox	6–1	Buchholz (2–3)	Halladay (13–6)		25,925	55–63	19½
119	August 20	Red Sox	8–1	Lester (10–7)	Cecil (5–2)		22,817	55–64	20
120	August 21	Angels	5–4	Rzepczynski (2–3)	O'Sullivan (3–2)	Janssen (1)	15,993	56–64	20
121	August 22	Angels	7–3	Santana (7–6)	Richmond (6–7)		23,235	56–65	20
122	August 23	Angels	8–3	Romero (11–5)	Bell (1–1)		23,935	57–65	20½
123	August 24	Rays	12–7	Niemann (12–5)	Halladay (13–7)		17,184	57–66	20½
124	August 25	Rays	7–3	Shields (8–10)	Cecil (5–3)		17,307	57–67	20½
125	August 26	Rays	3–2	League (2–5)	Howell (6–4)		15,349	58–67	20½
126	August 28	@ Red Sox	6–5	Okajima (5–0)	Tallet (5–8)	Papelbon (31)	37,844	58–68	21
127	August 29	@ Red Sox	3–2	Buchholz (3–3)	Romero (11–6)	Papelbon (32)	37,452	58–69	22
128	August 30	@ Red Sox	7–0	Byrd (1–0)	Halladay (13–8)		37,560	58–70	23
129	August 31	@ Rangers	18–10	Cecil (6–3)	Holland (7–9)		16,675	59–70	23

September 16–14 (home 10–5, road 6–9)

#	Date	Opponent	Score	Win	Loss	Save	Attendance	Record	GB
130	September 1	@ Rangers	5–2	Nippert (5–2)	Rzepczynski (2–4)	Francisco (20)		59–71	24½
131	September 1	@ Rangers	5–2	McCarthy (6–2)	Tallet (5–9)	Francisco (21)	17,203	59–72	24½
132	September 2	@ Rangers	6–4	Hunter (7–3)	Richmond (6–8)	Francisco (22)	21,836	59–73	25½
133	September 3	Yankees	10–5	Aceves (10–1)	Romero (11–7)		22,773	59–74	26½
134	September 4	Yankees	6–0	Halladay (14–8)	Chamberlain (8–5)		22,179	60–74	25½
135	September 5	Yankees	6–4	Pettitte (13–6)	Cecil (6–4)	Hughes (3)	31,295	60–75	26½
136	September 6	Yankees	14–8	Tallet (6–9)	Mitre (3–2)		30,873	61–75	25½
137	September 7	Twins	6–3	Crain (5–4)	Richmond (6–9)	Nathan (37)	13,153	61–76	27
138	September 8	Twins	6–3	Romero (12–7)	Rauch (4–3)	Frasor (7)	13,488	62–76	27
139	September 9	Twins	4–1	Pavano (12–11)	Halladay (14–9)	Nathan (38)	11,159	62–77	28
140	September 10	Twins	3–2	Cecil (7–4)	Baker (13–8)	Frasor (8)	11,461	63–77	27½
141	September 11	@ Tigers	6–4	Tallet (7–9)	Robertson (2–1)	Frasor (9)	31,575	64–77	26½
142	September 12	@ Tigers	8–6	League (3–5)	Rodney (2–4)	Frasor (10)	36,142	65–77	25½
143	September 13	@ Tigers	7–2	Porcello (13–8)	Romero (12–8)		32,468	65–78	26½
144	September 14	@ Tigers	6–5 (10)	Seay (6–3)	Wolfe (1–2)		24,375	65–79	27½
145	September 15	@ Yankees	10–4	Halladay (15–9)	Mitre (3–3)		45,847	66–79	26½
146	September 16	@ Yankees	5–4	Rivera (3–2)	Frasor (6–3)		46,046	66–80	27½
147	September 18	@ Rays	11–4	Shields (10–11)	Richmond (6–10)		18,426	66–81	27½
148	September 19	@ Rays	4–0	Garza (8–10)	Romero (12–9)		22,705	66–82	28½
149	September 20	@ Rays	3–1	Price (9–7)	Halladay (15–10)	Howell (17)	20,937	66–83	28½
150	September 21	Orioles	9–2	Purcey (1–2)	Tillamn (2–4)		11,598	67–83	27½
151	September 22	Orioles	6–5 (11)	Camp (2–6)	Sarfate (0–1)		11,869	68–83	27½
152	September 23	Orioles	7–3	Richmond (7–10)	Guthrie (10–16)		13,743	69–83	27½
153	September 24	Mariners	5–4	Hernández (17–5)	Carlson (1–6)	Aardsma (36)	15,306	69–84	28
154	September 25	Mariners	5–0	Halladay (16–10)	Fister (2–4)		20,668	70–84	28
155	September 26	Mariners	5–4 (10)	Frasor (7–3)	Kelley (5–4)		29,783	71–84	28
156	September 27	Mariners	5–4	Wolfe (2–2)	Rowland-Smith (4–4)	Camp (1)	39,052	72–84	28
157	September 28	@ Red Sox	11–5 (7)	Richmond (8–10)	Bowden (0–1)		37,591	73–84	28
158	September 29	@ Red Sox	8–7	Romero (13–9)	Buchholz (7–4)	Frasor (11)	37,618	74–84	28
159	September 30	@ Red Sox	12–0	Halladay (17–10)	Wakefield (11–5)		37,246	75–84	27

October 0–3 (home 0–0, road 0–3)

#	Date	Opponent	Score	Win	Loss	Save	Attendance	Record	GB
160	October 2	@ Orioles	13–7	Berken (6–12)	Purcey (1–3)		16,921	75–85	27
161	October 3	@ Orioles	6–3	Hendrickson (6–5)	Richmond (8–11)	Johnson (10)	23,254	75–86	27
162	October 4	@ Orioles	5–4 (11)	Albers (3–6)	League (3–6)		17,969	75–87	28

== Player stats ==
Note: Yellow background = Team leader

=== Batting ===
Note: G = Games played; AB = At Bats; R = Runs scored; H = Hits; 2B = Doubles; 3B = Triples; HR = Home runs; RBI = Runs batted in; AVG = Batting average; SB = Stolen bases

Player	G	AB	R	H	2B	3B	HR	RBI	AVG	SB
Russ Adams	8	20	2	4	0	0	0	0	.200	0
Rod Barajas	125	429	43	97	19	0	19	71	.226	1
Michael Barrett	7	18	3	3	0	0	1	2	.167	0
José Bautista	113	336	54	79	13	3	13	79	.235	4
Raúl Chávez	51	159	10	41	8	0	2	15	.258	1
David Dellucci	22	65	5	12	4	0	0	3	.185	0
Edwin Encarnación	42	154	25	37	5	1	8	23	.240	1
Aaron Hill	158	682	103	195	37	0	36	108	.286	6
Joe Inglett	36	89	11	25	4	1	0	31	.281	3
Adam Lind	151	587	93	179	46	0	35	114	.305	1
John McDonald	73	151	18	39	7	0	4	13	.258	0
Kevin Millar	78	251	29	56	14	0	7	29	.223	0
Lyle Overbay	132	423	57	112	35	1	16	64	.265	0
Kyle Phillips	5	18	1	5	3	0	0	2	.278	0
Alex Ríos	108	436	52	115	25	2	14	62	.264	19
Scott Rolen	88	338	52	108	29	0	8	43	.320	4
Randy Ruiz	33	115	25	36	7	0	10	17	.313	1
Marco Scutaro	144	574	100	162	35	1	12	60	.282	14
Travis Snider	77	241	34	58	14	1	9	29	.241	1
Vernon Wells	158	630	84	164	37	3	15	66	.260	17
Pitcher totals	162	20	0	0	0	0	0	0	.000	0
Team totals	162	5696	798	1516	339	13	209	766	.266	73

=== Pitching ===
Note: W = Wins; L = Losses; ERA = Earned run average; G = Games pitched; GS = Games started; SV = Saves; IP = Innings pitched; H = Hits allowed; R = Runs allowed; ER = Earned runs allowed; BB = Walks allowed; K = Strikeouts

Player	W	L	ERA	G	GS	SV	IP	R	ER	BB	K
Jeremy Accardo	0	0	2.55	26	0	1	24.2	7	7	17	18
Bryan Bullington	0	0	3.00	4	0	0	6.0	2	2	6	5
Brian Burres	0	2	14.21	2	2	0	6.1	12	10	5	4
Shawn Camp	2	6	3.50	59	0	1	79.2	33	31	29	58
Jesse Carlson	1	6	4.66	73	0	0	67.2	37	35	21	51
Brett Cecil	7	4	5.30	18	17	0	93.1	56	55	38	69
Scott Downs	1	3	3.09	48	0	9	46.2	18	16	13	43
Jason Frasor	7	3	2.50	61	0	11	57.2	16	16	16	56
Roy Halladay	17	10	2.79	32	32	0	239.0	76	74	35	208
Dirk Hayhurst	0	0	2.78	15	0	0	22.2	7	7	9	13
Casey Janssen	2	4	5.85	21	5	1	40.0	27	26	14	24
Brandon League	3	6	4.58	67	0	0	74.2	38	38	21	76
Jesse Litsch	0	1	9.00	10	0	0	9.0	9	9	1	8
Brad Mills	0	1	14.09	2	2	0	7.2	12	12	6	9
Bill Murphy	0	0	3.18	8	0	0	11.1	4	4	8	6
David Purcey	1	3	6.19	9	9	0	48.0	35	33	30	39
Robert Ray	1	2	4.44	4	4	0	24.1	15	12	6	13
Scott Richmond	8	11	5.52	27	24	0	138.2	87	85	59	117
Ricky Romero	13	9	4.30	29	29	0	178.0	85	85	79	141
B. J. Ryan	1	1	6.53	25	0	2	20.2	15	15	17	13
Marc Rzepczynski	2	4	3.67	11	11	0	61.1	25	25	30	60
Brian Tallet	7	9	5.32	37	25	0	160.2	98	95	72	120
Brian Wolfe	2	2	8.22	14	0	0	15.1	14	14	7	11
Team totals	75	87	4.47	162	162	25	1451.0	771	720	551	1181

== Honours and awards ==
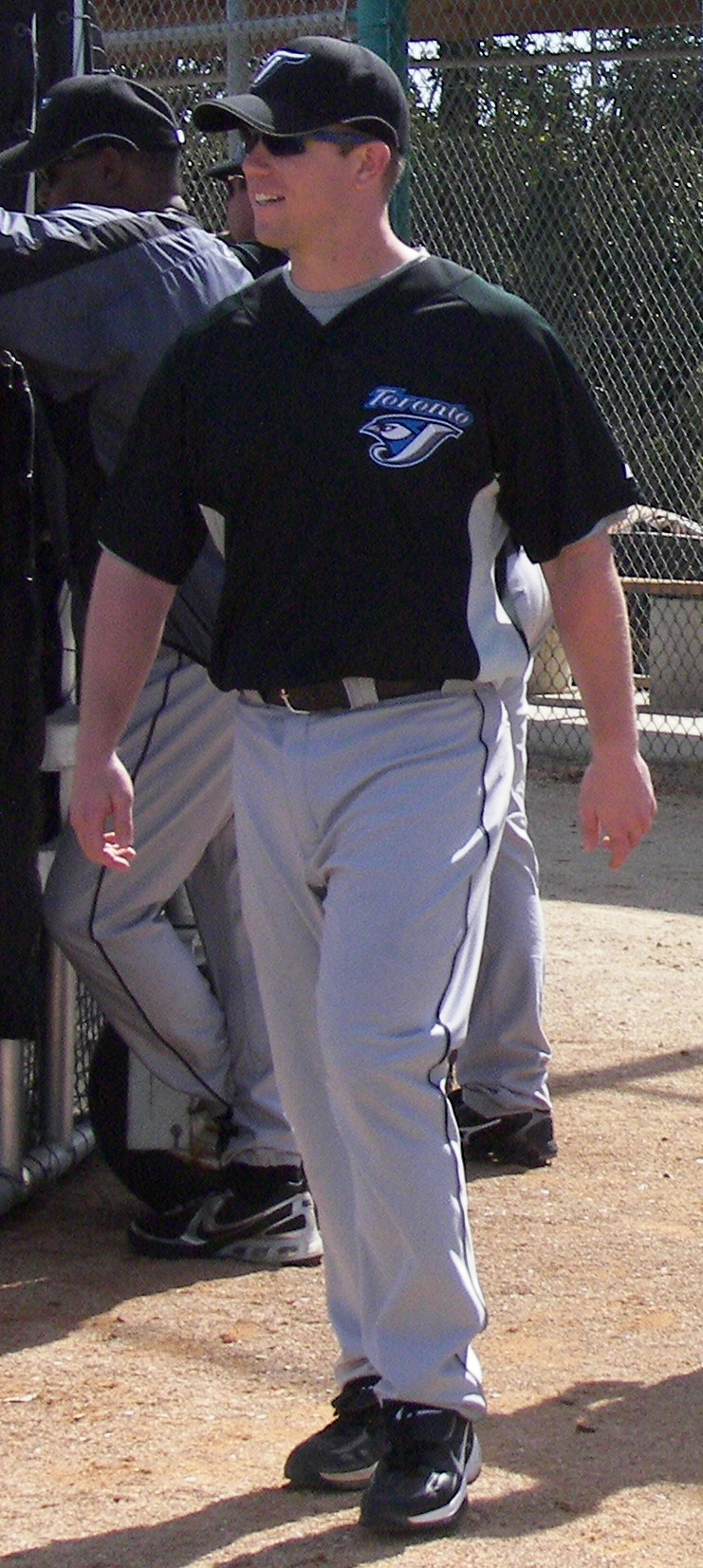
Aaron Hill had a career year with the Blue Jays in 2009

All-Star Game

- Aaron Hill – 2B (starter)
- Roy Halladay – P (starter)

Awards

- Aaron Hill – AL Comeback Player of the Year Award
- Aaron Hill – Silver Slugger Award -2B
- Adam Lind Silver Slugger Award -DH

== Farm system ==
Level	Team	League	Manager
AAA	Las Vegas 51s	Pacific Coast League	Mike Basso
AA	New Hampshire Fisher Cats	Eastern League	Gary Cathcart
A	Dunedin Blue Jays	Florida State League	Omar Malavé
A	Lansing Lugnuts	Midwest League	Clayton McCullough
A-Short Season	Auburn Doubledays	New York–Penn League	Dennis Holmberg
Rookie	GCL Blue Jays	Gulf Coast League	John Schneider
