= Davey Hamilton Jr. =

American racing driver from Idaho (born 1997)

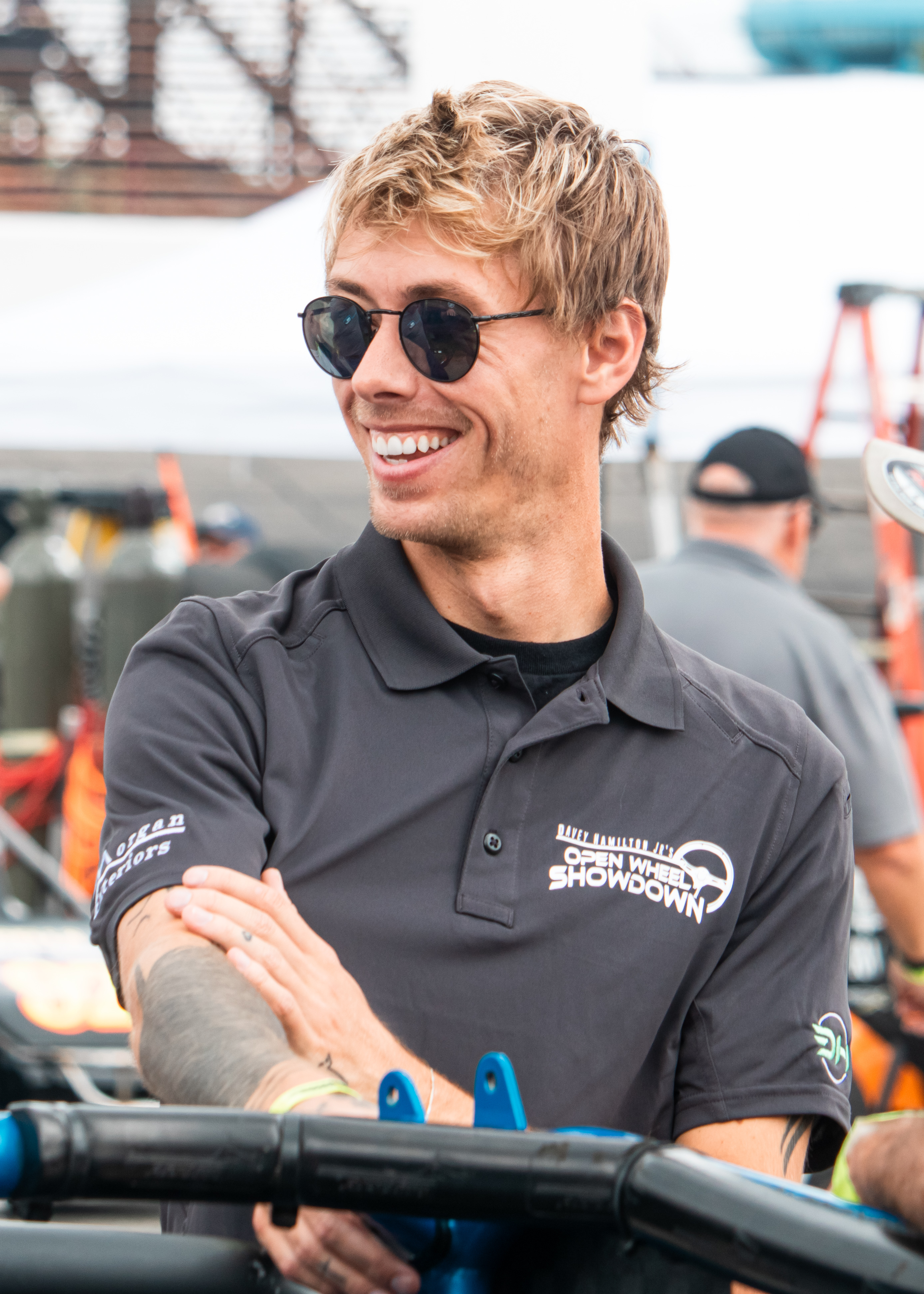
- Hamilton Jr. before the 2024 Little 500
- Nationality: American
- Born: David Jay Hamilton Jr. March 15, 1997 (age 29)
- Relatives: Davey Hamilton (father); Ken Hamilton (grandfather)

Indy NXT career
- Current team: Cusick Motorsports

Southern Sprint Car Shootout Series
- Years active: 2018, 2021–2024
- Starts: 23
- Championships: 1
- Wins: 12
- Best finish: 1st in 2022

Previous series
- 2017 2016 2022 2024: NASCAR K&N Pro Series West; Indy Lights; Stadium SuperTrucks; USAC Silver Crown Series

Championship titles
- 2016 2022: King of the Wing; Southern Sprintcar Shootout Series

Awards
- 2022 2023: Winningest Pavement Sprint Car Driver
- Statistics up to date as of June 3, 2024.

Davey Jay Hamilton Jr. (born March 15, 1997) is an American racing driver from Idaho who last competed in Indy NXT for Cusick Motorsports and HMD Motorsports. He is the son of former Indianapolis 500 competitor Davey Hamilton.

Hamilton has raced mainly midgets, sprint cars, and in the Stadium Super Trucks. He made his Indy Lights debut in 2016 and competed again in 2018 and 2025.

== Racing career ==
Hamilton started his racing career in karting at his local karttrack near Star, Idaho. The third generation racing driver made his debut in the USAC Midgets. In 2011 Hamilton finished eleventh in the Ford Focus Midwestern Pavement division. For 2012, Hamilton improved to a sixth place in the series.

In 2015, Hamilton won the King of the Wing's Western Sprintcar Series. Hamilton began testing an Indy Lights car with McCormack Racing in 2015. It was initially announced that he would compete in the full 2016 Indy Lights season with the team but the entry did not materialize until the season finale at Mazda Raceway Laguna Seca where Hamilton finally made his series debut. He won the King of the Wing championship in 2016.

In 2017, Hamilton joined the Stadium Super Trucks, racing Always Evolving's No. 75 at the Grand Prix of St. Petersburg. At the Beijing National Stadium round, Hamilton won the race, but did not take the joker lane and was disqualified. He also drove in one NASCAR K&N Pro Series West late that year.

On April 30, 2018, after a rookie test at Kentucky Speedway, Team Pelfrey announced that Hamilton would be competing in that year's Freedom 100 at Indianapolis Motor Speedway, and that they were working to add more appearance in 2018 and 2019.

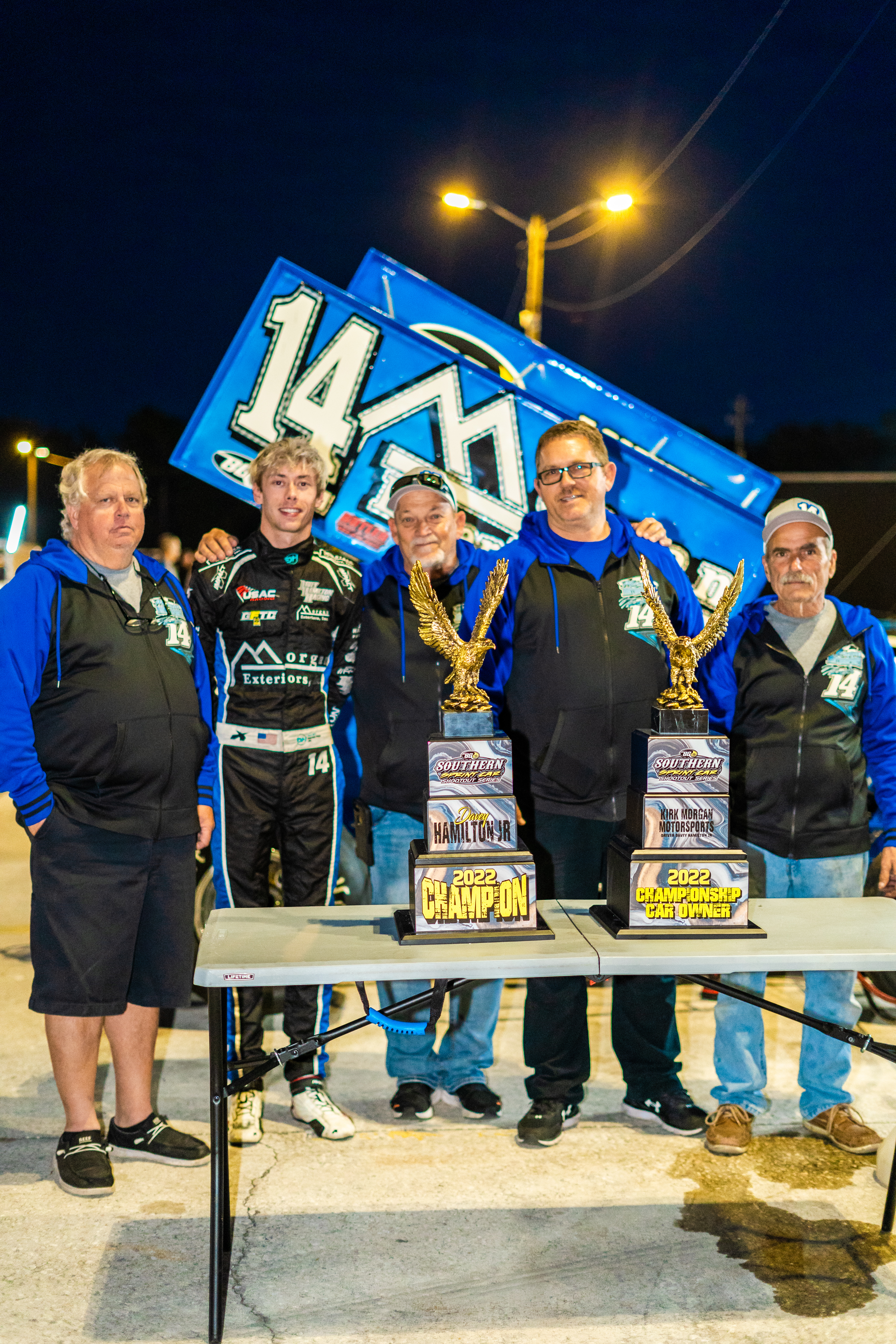
Kirk Morgan racing with Hamilton after winning the 2022 Driver and Owner's Championships

Hamilton's career was put on hold from 2019 to much of 2021 following his assault arrest. He returned to racing in October 2021 in the USAC Silver Crown Series and won in his second race sprint car race with Kirk Morgan's Morgan Motorsports team. The performance promoted him to a full season with the team in 2022. Hamilton won six races, as well as the Southern Sprintcar Shooutout Series championship in 2022.

Hamilton also planned to race for that year's SST championship, but a ramp landing in the season opener at the Grand Prix of Long Beach caused him to reaggravate a T4 spinal fracture that he suffered in a sprint car crash in 2017. Although the SST schedule was dropped, he continued his oval racing.

In 2023, Hamilton won his first career USAC Silver Crown race at Gateway in St. Louis, Missouri with Legacy Autosport.

In 2023, Hamilton promoted the inaugural Open Wheel Showdown at the Bullring at Las Vegas Motor Speedway The $50,000 to win Winged Sprint Car race was the highest paying of all-time for the discipline and also included Midgets and Super Modifieds competing.

On May 14, 2025, it was announced that Hamilton would return to Indy Lights, now renamed Indy NXT, driving for HMD Motorsports at the four oval events of the season.

== Personal life ==
In February 2019, Hamilton was arrested in Florida on charges of false imprisonment and aggravated assault after breaking into his ex-girlfriend's hotel room and holding her at knife-point. He had been struggling with concussions for months prior to the incident that he sustained in race crashes. Hamilton was sentenced to five years of probation. While his driving career was on hiatus, he started a series of businesses and became an ambassador for the Brian Hamilton Foundation, which helps those with criminal records become entrepreneurs.

In 2023, Hamilton explored a career in DJing as part of music duo 'Elusive' which released one original song and a remix.

In 2024, Hamilton announced his support for the LGBTQ community on his Instagram.

== Racing record ==
=== American Open-Wheel racing results ===
(key) (Races in bold indicate pole position, races in italics indicate fastest race lap)

==== Indy Lights / Indy NXT ====
| Year | Team | 1 | 2 | 3 | 4 | 5 | 6 | 7 | 8 | 9 | 10 | 11 | 12 | 13 | 14 | 15 | 16 | 17 | 18 | Rank | Points |
|---|---|---|---|---|---|---|---|---|---|---|---|---|---|---|---|---|---|---|---|---|---|
| 2016 | McCormack Racing | STP | STP | PHX | ALA | ALA | IMS | IMS | INDY | RDA | RDA | IOW | TOR | TOR | MOH | MOH | WGL | LAG; 14 | LAG; 14 | 21st | 14 |
| 2018 | Team Pelfrey | STP | STP | ALA | ALA | IMS | IMS | INDY; 7 | ROA | ROA | IOW | TOR | TOR | MOH | MOH | GTW | POR | POR | | 12th | 21 |
| 2025 | HMD Motorsports | STP | BAR | IMS | IMS | DET | GMP; 15 | RDA | MOH | IOW; 15 | LAG | LAG | POR | MIL; 15 | NSH; 16 | | | | | 23rd | 59 |

=== Stadium Super Trucks ===
(key) (Bold – Pole position. Italics – Fastest qualifier. * – Most laps led.)

Stadium Super Trucks results
| Year | 1 | 2 | 3 | 4 | 5 | 6 | 7 | 8 | 9 | 10 | 11 | 12 | 13 | 14 | 15 | 16 | 17 | 18 | 19 | 20 | 21 | 22 | SSTC | Pts | Ref |
|---|---|---|---|---|---|---|---|---|---|---|---|---|---|---|---|---|---|---|---|---|---|---|---|---|---|
| 2017 | ADE | ADE | ADE | STP; 6 | STP; 10 | LBH; 8 | LBH; 7 | PER | PER | PER | **DET**; 7 | DET | TEX | TEX | HID | HID | HID | BEI; 12^{1} | GLN | GLN | ELS | ELS | 14th | 76 | |
| 2018 | ELS | ADE | ADE | ADE | LBH; 5 | LBH; 7 | PER | PER | DET | DET | TEX | TEX | ROA | ROA | SMP | SMP | HLN | HLN | MXC; 9 | MXC; 8 | | | 16th | 58 | |
| 2022 | LBH; 8 | LBH; 8 | MOH | MOH | NSH | NSH | BRI | BRI | | | | | | | | | | | | | | | 16th | 26 | |

^{1} Although Hamilton led the most laps, his disqualification resulted in the bonus points being awarded to Bill Hynes.

=== NASCAR ===
(key) (Bold – Pole position awarded by qualifying time. Italics – Pole position earned by points standings or practice time. * – Most laps led.)

==== K&N Pro Series West ====
NASCAR K&N Pro Series West results
| Year | Team | No. | Make | 1 | 2 | 3 | 4 | 5 | 6 | 7 | 8 | 9 | 10 | 11 | 12 | 13 | 14 | NKNPSWC | Pts |
|---|---|---|---|---|---|---|---|---|---|---|---|---|---|---|---|---|---|---|---|
| 2017 | Patriot Motorsports Group | 38 | Chevy | TUS | KCR | IRW | IRW | SPO | OSS | CNS | SON | IOW | EVG | DCS | MER | AAS | KCR; 15 | 52nd | 29 |
