= Boise Valley Herald =

Defunct newspaper from Middleton, Idaho, USA

- Type: Weekly newspaper
- Founder: A.L. Murphy
- Founded: 1907 (as the Middleton Herald)
- Ceased publication: 1968
- Language: English
- City: Middleton, Idaho
- OCLC number: 19023744

The Boise Valley Herald was weekly newspaper published in Middleton, Idaho, from 1907 to 1968.

== History ==
In January 1907, real estate developer R.L. Murphy founded The Herald as a means to promote the town of Middleton. That June, J.T. Garrison took charge as editor.

J.L. Bertsch published the paper for a few years until it was acquired by William Lemon in 1913, followed by Adelbert Cornell in 1926. It was renamed to the Boise Valley Herald in 1928. Publisher Adelbert Cornell died in 1967, and passed the Herald on to his children.

Ralph Hunter, owner of the Meridian News-Times, purchased the Herald from Boyd Cornell in 1968. At the same time, Hunter also acquired the Kuna-Melba Herald and The Garden City Gazette. The four papers were then merged into a single publication called the Valley News-Times.

== 1942 Seditious Declaration ==
In early September 1942, the U.S. Postal Service and the U.S. Justice Department cited the Herald for sedition and temporary banned it from postal delivery, alleging it had violated the Espionage Act of 1917. Postmaster General Frank C. Walker acted on the recommendation of Attorney General Francis Biddle, and claimed the Herald published pro-Axis power propaganda. Previously publisher Adelbert Cornell's two sons, Boyd and Clark, served 9 months at the Kooskia Internment Camp for failing to register under the Selective Service Act of 1940.

At a hearing on Sept. 22, Cornell failed to show, but was represented by ACLU attorney Sol Alpher. The ban was made permanent that October, with Walker citing as evidence articles in the Herald which criticized the U.S. participation in World War II, praised the Japanese Empire and Vichy France, and criticized the lend-Lease program. Cornell vowed to continue delivering the paper himself to his 400 subscribers. Two years later the federal government lifted the ban in January 1944.

On the incident, historian David T. Beito wrote in 2023: "The experience of the Boise Valley Herald some 82 years ago underlines the importance of protecting free speech and freedom of the press."
