= Middleton School District =

School district in Middleton, Idaho, United States

Address
- 5 South Viking Avenue Middleton, Idaho, 83644; United States
- Coordinates: 43.7060424°N 116.6268213°W

District information
- Superintendent: Marc Gee
- Asst. superintendent(s): Lisa Pennington
- Schools: Middleton High School, Middleton Academy, Middleton Middle School, Heights Elementary, Mill Creek Elementary, Purple Sage Elementary.

Students and staff
- District mascot: Viking
- Colors: Blue and tan

Other information
- Website: www.msd134.org

Middleton School District is a school district based in Middleton, Idaho, United States. It operates Middleton High School and several lower-grade schools.

The district includes almost all of Middleton and the majority of the Canyon County portion of Star.

== 2018 Halloween incident ==
Photographs of teachers at Heights Elementary School dressed as the proposed United States-Mexico border wall were posted to Facebook and were widely shared. The school district subsequently announced that the teachers would be placed on paid leave and staff would be provided with sensitivity training.

== Schools ==
- Middleton High School
- Middleton Academy
- Middleton Middle School
- Heights Elementary
- Mill Creek Elementary
- Purple Sage Elementary
