= Robert Ray (baseball) =

American baseball player (born 1984)

- Pitcher
- Born: January 21, 1984 (age 42); Lufkin, Texas, U.S.
- Batted: Right Threw: Right

MLB debut
- May 2, 2009, for the Toronto Blue Jays

Last MLB appearance
- September 30, 2010, for the Toronto Blue Jays

MLB statistics
- Win–loss record: 1–2
- Earned Run Average: 4.18
- Strikeouts: 16
- Stats at Baseball Reference

Teams
- Toronto Blue Jays (2009–2010)

Robert Andrew Ray (born January 21, 1984) is an American former professional baseball pitcher. He played in Major League Baseball (MLB) for the Toronto Blue Jays in 2009 and 2010.

== Career ==
=== Amateur ===
Ray attended Texas A&M University, and in 2004, he played collegiate summer baseball with the Wareham Gatemen of the Cape Cod Baseball League where he was named a league all-star. He was selected by the Toronto Blue Jays in the 7th round (206th overall) of the 2005 Major League Baseball draft.

=== Toronto Blue Jays ===
For half of the 2006 season Ray played 15 games for the Auburn Doubledays with a 2.77 ERA, with 4 wins and 3 losses. From 2006 to 2008 Ray played for the Dunedin Blue Jays with an ERA in mid 4.00; in 45 games for the Dunedin Blue Jays, he had a 10–10 record. For the last half of the 2008 season Ray played for the New Hampshire Fisher Cats with a 3.18 ERA, compiling an 8–6 record.

Robert Ray made two 2009 minor-league starts, one at Single-A and one at Triple-A. He was called up from the Triple-A Las Vegas 51s to the Toronto Blue Jays on May 1, 2009, along with Brian Wolfe and Brett Cecil, after Toronto demoted Brian Burres, David Purcey and Bryan Bullington. On Saturday May 2, Ray made his major league debut against the Baltimore Orioles, pitching 5.2 innings, allowing 3 earned runs, 4 base on balls, 2 strikeouts, and getting the no-decision. Ray managed to secure his first win on May 16, 2009 after pitching a brilliant 8 innings giving up no earned runs. The Blue jays won the game 2–1. On May 21, 2009, starter Ray led the Jays to a 5–1 loss against the second place Boston Red Sox, raising his ERA (earned run average) to 4.44. Ray was designated for assignment on May 16, 2011 to make room on the 40-man roster for Eric Thames. He was released from the team on May 19, 2011.

=== Miami Marlins ===
On November 28, 2011, Ray signed a minor league contract with the Miami Marlins.
