= Sierra Jackson =

American sprint car racer

Sierra (Jackson) Giesler (born August 1992) is a sprint car racer from Middleton, Idaho.

Giesler began dirt track kart racing at the age of six, graduating to asphalt sprint car racing in 2006 and briefly racing late model stock cars in 2007. She has had wins at racetracks throughout the Northwestern United States and in Canada.

Giesler holds sprint car qualifying speed records at Magic Valley Speedway in Twin Falls, Idaho and on the old track configuration at Meridian Speedway in Meridian, Idaho.

Giesler is the youngest driver and first female to win the Northwest Sprintcar Racing Association championship, doing so in 2011 at the age of 19, also becoming the first Ford driver to do so. She was also the inaugural Canadian-American Western Winged Sprintcars champion in 2012. In 2014, she finished second in the western portion of Davey Hamilton's King of the Wing Series.

She is also the only female driver to win the prestigious NSRA/WWS Diamond Cup at Meridian Speedway, winning it in 2011 and again in 2014, as well as being a two-time winner of the Naylor Memorial Classic and the 2012 Daffodil Cup winner at Western Speedway in Canada On November 22, 2015, Jackson won the National King of the Wing race at Kern County Raceway for her first King of the Wing Series win. She finished second in the national King of the Wing standings and again finished second in the western region in 2015.
