= Middleton, Idaho =

- City
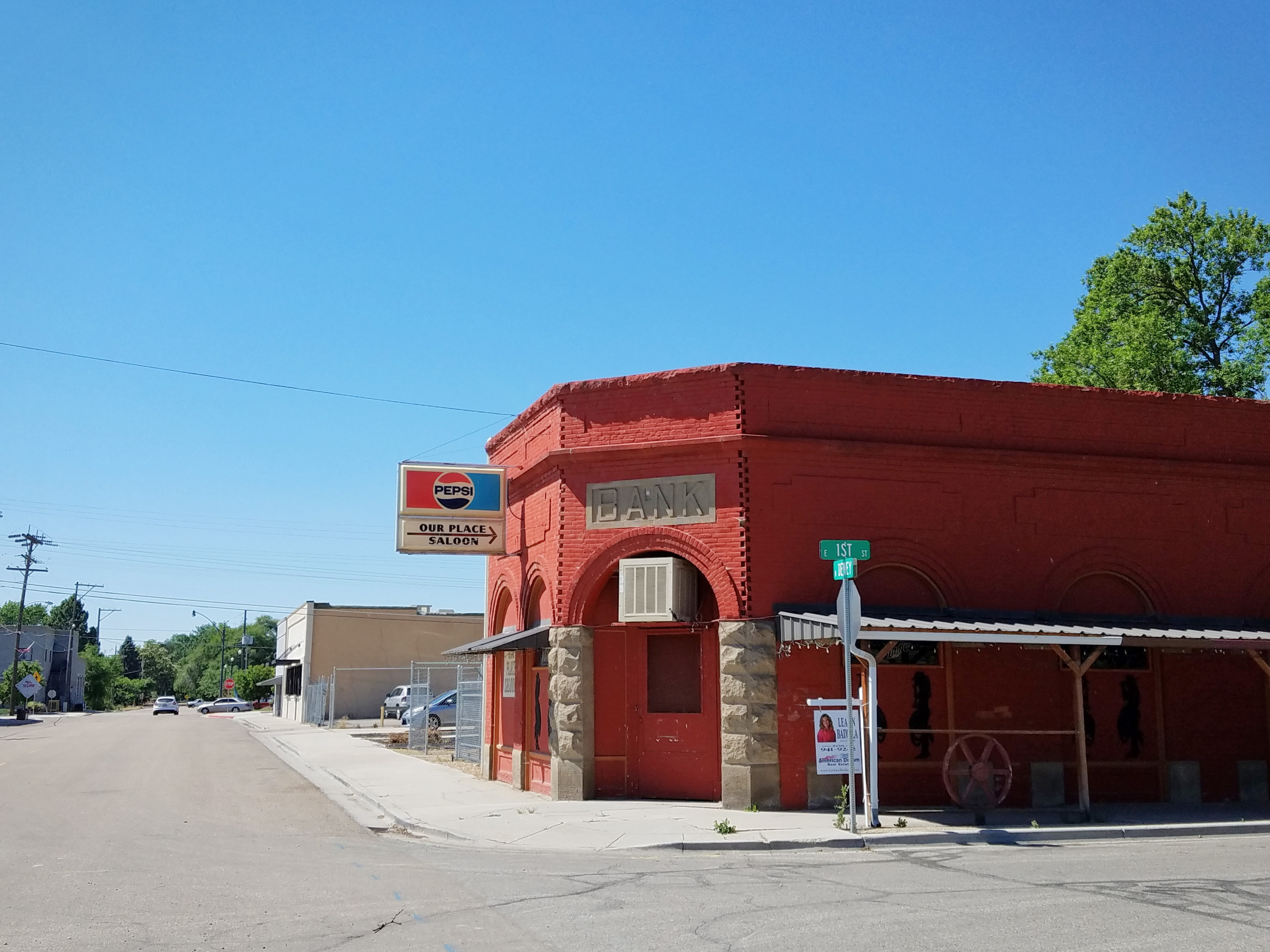
- Motto: "Life is Better Here"
- Location of Middleton in Canyon County, Idaho.
- Coordinates: 43°42′43″N 116°37′14″W
- Country: United States
- State: Idaho
- County: Canyon
- Incorporated: 1910

Area
  - Total: 5.62 sq mi (14.55 km^{2})
  - Land: 5.58 sq mi (14.44 km^{2})
  - Water: 0.042 sq mi (0.11 km^{2})
- Elevation: 2,402 ft (732 m)

Population (2020)
  - Total: 9,425
  - Density: 1,677.3/sq mi (647.6/km^{2})
- Time zone: UTC-7 (Mountain (MST))
  - Summer (DST): UTC-6 (MDT)
- ZIP code: 83644
- Area code: 208
- FIPS code: 16-52660
- GNIS feature ID: 2411095
- Website: middleton.id.gov

Middleton is a city in Canyon County, Idaho, United States. The population amounted to 9,091 at the 2021 census estimate, up from 5,524 at the 2010 census and 2,978 in 2000. It is part of the Boise City–Nampa, Idaho Metropolitan Statistical Area.

== History ==
Middleton was named for its location midway between Old Fort Boise and Keeney’s Ferry, serving as a resting point for travelers en route to the ferry. In its early years along the Oregon Trail, it had a stage station, a post office established in 1866, and a water-powered grist mill built in 1871. The Ward Massacre occurred near the area in 1854.

Middleton is the oldest settlement in Canyon County, with its land first parceled out in 1863 by William N. Montgomery. In 1872, flooding of the Boise River created a new channel that left the town isolated on an island. As a result, the settlement was relocated to a new site after 1880. Middleton was incorporated as a city in 1910, although its certificate of incorporation was not issued until 1971.

The current mayor is Tim O'Meara.

== Geography ==
According to the United States Census Bureau, the city has a total area of 5.71 square miles (14.79 km^{2}), of which, 5.66 square miles (14.66 km^{2}) is land and 0.05 square miles (0.13 km^{2}) is water.

== Demographics ==
Historical population
Census	Pop.	Note	%±
1920	585		—
1930	372		−36.4%
1940	477		28.2%
1950	496		4.0%
1960	541		9.1%
1970	739		36.6%
1980	1,901		157.2%
1990	1,851		−2.6%
2000	2,978		60.9%
2010	5,524		85.5%
2020	9,425		70.6%
U.S. Decennial Census

=== 2020 census ===
As of the 2020 census, Middleton had a population of 9,425. The median age was 34.2 years. 32.0% of residents were under the age of 18 and 13.3% of residents were 65 years of age or older. For every 100 females there were 97.9 males, and for every 100 females age 18 and over there were 91.9 males age 18 and over.

97.5% of residents lived in urban areas, while 2.5% lived in rural areas.

There were 3,061 households in Middleton, of which 46.1% had children under the age of 18 living in them. Of all households, 61.2% were married-couple households, 11.7% were households with a male householder and no spouse or partner present, and 20.1% were households with a female householder and no spouse or partner present. About 17.4% of all households were made up of individuals and 7.6% had someone living alone who was 65 years of age or older.

There were 3,136 housing units, of which 2.4% were vacant. The homeowner vacancy rate was 0.9% and the rental vacancy rate was 2.0%.

Racial composition as of the 2020 census
Race	Number	Percent
White	7,896	83.8%
Black or African American	28	0.3%
American Indian and Alaska Native	80	0.8%
Asian	58	0.6%
Native Hawaiian and Other Pacific Islander	15	0.2%
Some other race	436	4.6%
Two or more races	912	9.7%
Hispanic or Latino (of any race)	1,083	11.5%

=== 2010 census ===
At the 2010 census there were 5,524 people in 1,843 households, including 1,392 families, in the city. The population density was 976.0 inhabitants per square mile (376.8/km^{2}). There were 2,037 housing units at an average density of 359.9 per square mile (139.0/km^{2}). The racial makup of the city was 92.5% White, 0.3% African American, 0.6% Native American, 0.5% Asian, 0.1% Pacific Islander, 3.3% from other races, and 2.8% from two or more races. Hispanic or Latino of any race were 10.0%.

Of the 1,843 households 49.5% had children under the age of 18 living with them, 54.7% were married couples living together, 13.6% had a female householder with no husband present, 7.2% had a male householder with no wife present, and 24.5% were non-families. 19.9% of households were one person and 7.1% were one person aged 65 or older. The average household size was 3.00 and the average family size was 3.45.

The median age was 30.5 years. 35.1% of residents were under the age of 18; 7.6% were between the ages of 18 and 24; 29.9% were from 25 to 44; 19.1% were from 45 to 64; and 8.2% were 65 or older. The gender makeup of the city was 49.9% male and 50.1% female.

=== 2000 census ===
At the 2000 census there were 2,978 people in 1,017 households, including 755 families, in the city. The population density was 1,696.8 inhabitants per square mile (655.1/km^{2}). There were 1,066 housing units at an average density of 607.4 per square mile (234.5/km^{2}). The racial makup of the city was 91.67% White, 0.30% African American, 1.07% Native American, 0.24% Asian, 0.24% Pacific Islander, 3.53% from other races, and 2.96% from two or more races. Hispanic or Latino of any race were 10.21%.

Of the 1,017 households 43.8% had children under the age of 18 living with them, 57.6% were married couples living together, 11.6% had a female householder with no husband present, and 25.7% were non-families. 18.5% of households were one person and 6.9% were one person aged 65 or older. The average household size was 2.93 and the average family size was 3.35.

The age distribution was 34.2% under the age of 18, 10.4% from 18 to 24, 31.9% from 25 to 44, 15.8% from 45 to 64, and 7.7% 65 or older. The median age was 28 years. For every 100 females, there were 97.9 males. For every 100 females age 18 and over, there were 94.9 males.

The median household income was $32,665 and the median family income was $34,734. Males had a median income of $27,298 versus $20,792 for females. The per capita income for the city was $12,447. About 7.5% of families and 10.4% of the population were below the poverty line, including 12.8% of those under age 18 and 16.5% of those age 65 or over.

== Transportation ==
The city is served by State Highway 44. It connects to Interstate 84 at exit 25, three miles (5 km) to the west; the city of Star is six miles (10 km) to the east on SH-44.

== Education ==
The majority of Middleton is in the Middleton School District 134. A small portion to the south is in the Vallivue School District 139.

Residents of Canyon County are in the area (and the taxation zone) for College of Western Idaho.

== Newspaper ==
The weekly Boise Valley Herald was published in Middleton from 1906 to 1968.

== Notable people ==
- Erik Fisher, a World Cup alpine ski racer
- Sierra Jackson, sprint car racer
- George Kennedy, actor
- Alison Rabe, attorney and member of the Idaho Senate
- Carlos Trujillo, long-distance runner
