= Rock 'n' Roll Seattle Marathon =

Annual race in the United States held since 2009

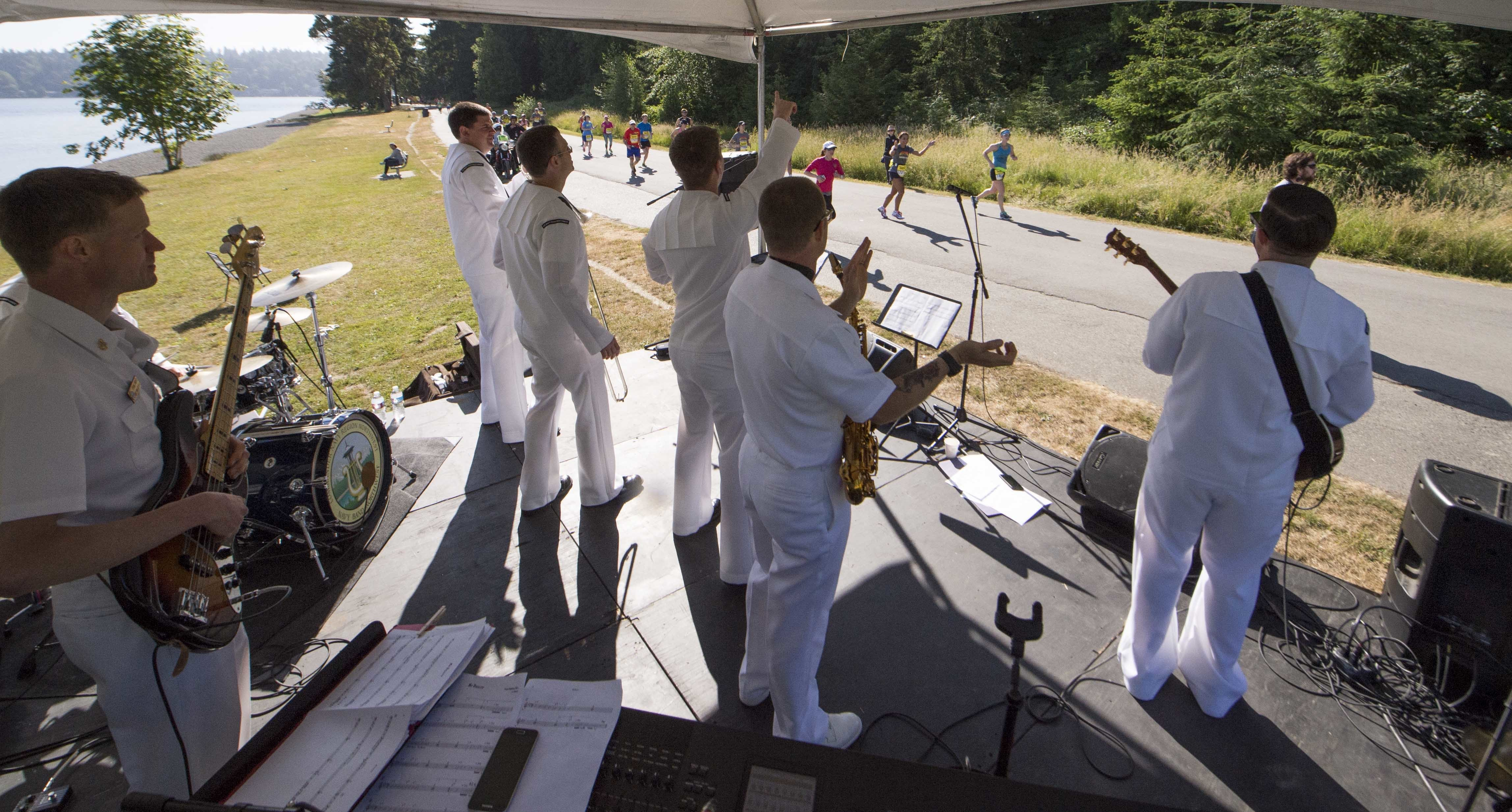
- Navy Band Northwest playing for runners in 2015
- Date: June
- Location: Seattle, Washington, U.S.
- Event type: Road
- Distance: Marathon, half marathon, 5K
- Established: 2009 (17 years ago)
- Website: https://www.runrocknroll.com/Events/Seattle
- Participants: 1,551 finishers (2019) >22,000 (all races) (2012)

External images
- Course map of full marathon in 2015
- Course map of full marathon in 2016
- Course map of full marathon in 2017
- Course map of full marathon in 2018

The Rock 'n' Roll Seattle Marathon was an annual marathon held in Seattle, Washington, since 2009. The race weekend also includes a half marathon and a 5K.

It was part of the Rock 'n' Roll Marathon Series organized by Advance Publications' Ironman Group.

The 2020 edition of the race was cancelled due to the coronavirus pandemic. Organizers initially announced that the race would return on the weekend of June 13, 2021, as a "half marathon event" before postponing it to the weekend of August 22 and then cancelling it altogether, with entries automatically transferred to 2022.

The 2022 edition was moved to the suburb of Bellevue and took place over Labor Day Weekend in early September. It featured a half-marathon and 5K in lieu of the full marathon. Organizers of the Rock 'n' Roll Seattle Marathon announced on their website that the Rock 'N' Roll Washington race series was being discontinued after 2022.

== Winners ==
Ed.	Date	Male Winner	Time	Female Winner	Time	Rf.
1	2009.06.27	Peter Omae (KEN)	2:18:17	Michele Suszek (USA)	2:38:37	
4	2012.06.23	Teshome Kokebe (ETH)	2:31:47	Sheila Croft (USA)	2:41:14	
11	2019.06.09	Shaun Frandsen (USA)	2:36:14	Christine Babcock (USA)	2:59:16	
	—	cancelled in 2020 and 2021 due to coronavirus pandemic				
