= Scott Richmond =

Canadian baseball player (born 1979)

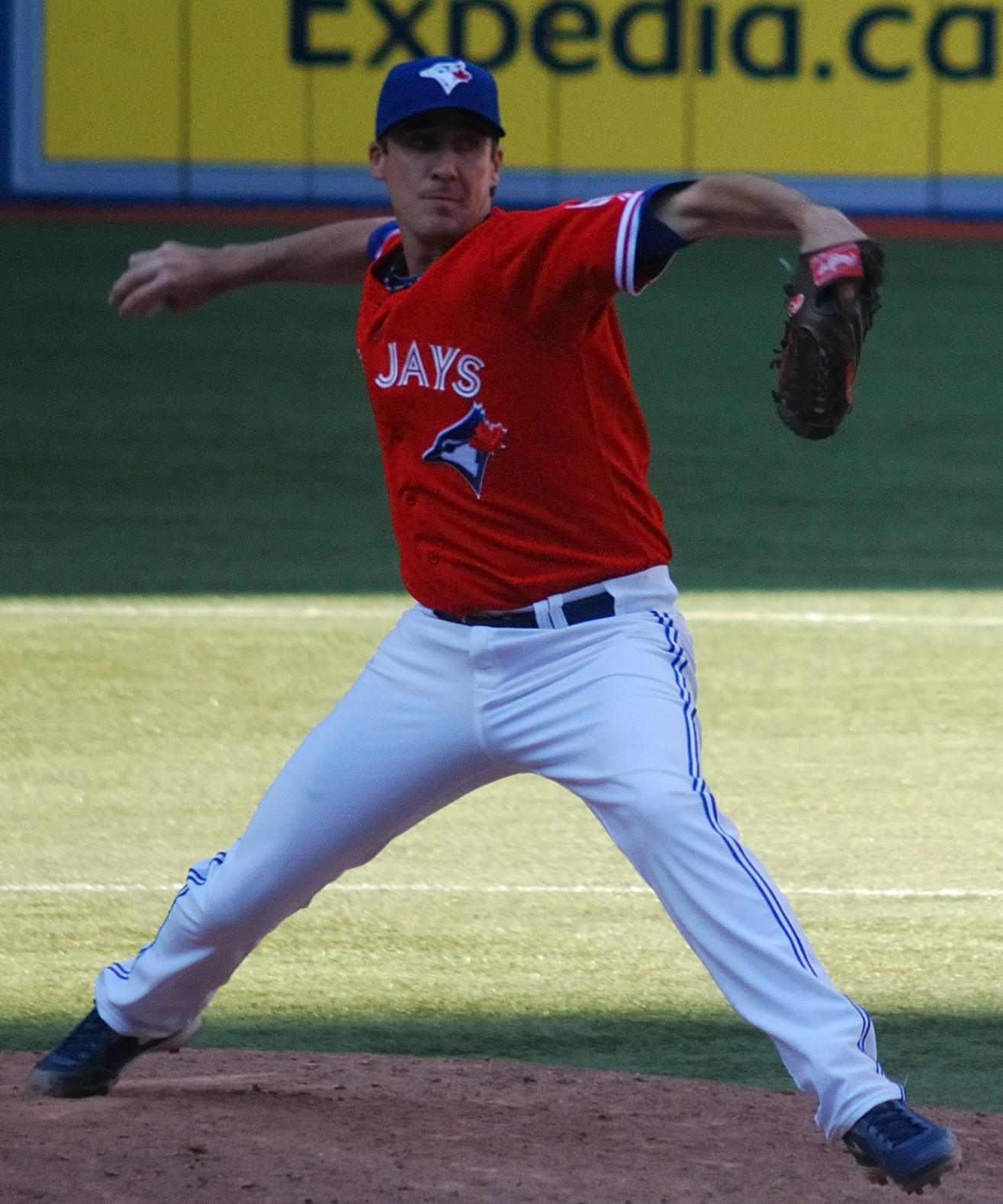
- Richmond with the Toronto Blue Jays
- Pitcher
- Born: August 30, 1979 (age 47); North Vancouver, British Columbia, Canada
- Batted: Right Threw: Right

Professional debut
- MLB: July 30, 2008, for the Toronto Blue Jays
- CPBL: March 30, 2016, for the EDA Rhinos

Last appearance
- MLB: July 1, 2012, for the Toronto Blue Jays
- CPBL: October 7, 2017, for the Fubon Guardians

MLB statistics
- Win–loss record: 9–14
- Earned run average: 5.27
- Strikeouts: 139

CPBL statistics
- Win–loss record: 16–16
- Earned run average: 4.66
- Strikeouts: 235
- Stats at Baseball Reference

Teams
- Toronto Blue Jays (2008–2009, 2011–2012); EDA Rhinos / Fubon Guardians (2016–2017)

Career highlights and awards
- Taiwan Series champion (2016)
Medals
Men's baseball
Representing Canada
Pan American Games
Gold medal – first place	2011 Guadalajara	Team
Gold medal – first place	2015 Toronto	Team
Silver medal – second place	2019 Lima	Team

Scott Daniel Richmond (born August 30, 1979) is a Canadian former professional baseball pitcher. He played in Major League Baseball (MLB) for the Toronto Blue Jays, and in the Chinese Professional Baseball League (CPBL) for the EDA Rhinos / Fubon Guardians.

== Career ==
=== College, independent, and minor league career ===
Richmond's high school did not offer baseball, and he played amateur summer baseball throughout western Canada, supporting himself by working on the Vancouver dockyards. He attended Missouri Valley College for one year, and played for the school's NAIA-level baseball team. He then moved to Bossier Parish Community College in Louisiana for one year, again playing for the baseball team. He transferred to Oklahoma State University, where he was an honourable mention All-Star in the Big 12 conference for the Cowboys in 2005, his final season, but went undrafted after college, as he was already 25 years of age.

=== Edmonton Capitals ===
He then joined the independent Northern League, where he played three seasons for the Edmonton Cracker-Cats. He struggled in his first season with Edmonton (1–4 record with four saves and a 6.25 ERA) in 2005. In 2006, he was 3–7 with eight saves and a 3.03 ERA, striking out 72 while walking only 17 in 71 1/3 innings and allowing just 53 hits. He led Edmonton in ERA, and had he qualified with enough innings pitched, he would have ranked fourth in the Northern League. Richmond moved to the starting rotation in 2007, where he had a 10–9 record and a 4.26 ERA. The rest of the staff was just 28–49, as Richmond led his team in wins. He was 10th in the Northern League in ERA, and was the pitcher of the year for Edmonton. After his contract expired, he was signed by the Toronto Blue Jays, after impressing scouts in an open tryout.

=== Toronto Blue Jays ===
In October 2007, Richmond signed a minor league contract with the Blue Jays. He had a 4.29 ERA and 115/36 K/BB ratio in 121 2/3 innings with 21 starts between the Double-A New Hampshire Fisher Cats and the Triple-A Syracuse Chiefs.

He made his first major league start on July 30, 2008, against the Tampa Bay Rays, and was the pitcher of record in a 3–2 loss. He went 5 1/3 innings, allowing all three runs on seven hits. After losing two of his first three starts with one no-decision, Richmond was demoted to Triple-A. He was called up again on September 2, and won his first career game at Baltimore on September 26. He finished the season with a 1–3 record and a 4.00 ERA in 27 innings pitched.

He did not play for Team Canada in the Beijing Olympics due to his call up to the Blue Jays.

Richmond was selected as a starting pitcher for Team Canada at the World Baseball Classic, but did not get to play. He was a starter at the Major League level for the Blue Jays for his first full season, due to injuries to Shaun Marcum and Dustin McGowan. In the month of April, Richmond went 3–0, allowing seven earned runs, 20 strikeouts with a 2.70 ERA over 23.1 innings pitched. His strong performance played an important role in keeping Toronto in first place for the month of April. Richmond was honoured by Major League Baseball for his strong April, winning the Rookie of the Month award for the American League.

As the Jays' fifth starter for 2009, Richmond, through the third week of June, had also made three bullpen appearances on occasions when scheduled off-days removed the need for a fifth starter and when the Jays' relief corps was overworked. Due to a multitude of injuries to Jays' pitchers, Richmond through the third week of June remained the only Jays' starter who had been in the rotation since the start of the season. He set a career high with 11 strikeouts against the Philadelphia Phillies, pitching eight innings in a 7–1 win on June 17.

On July 4, Richmond was put on the DL for the first time in his career with shoulder tendinitis.

Richmond started his comeback in June 2010 with the Single-A Dunedin Blue Jays. He worked his way up through the system, pitching at three different levels, finishing up with the Las Vegas 51s in September. He opened the 2011 season with the Blue Jays, appearing in one game on April 10 before being optioned back to Las Vegas.

On July 23, 2011, Richmond was outrighted to Triple-A, after previously being designated for assignment.

Richmond was recalled from Triple-A Las Vegas on June 25, 2012, following an injury to pitcher Henderson Álvarez. Richmond was optioned back to Triple-A Las Vegas 51s on July 5. He was designated for assignment on August 10. On August 13, the Blue Jays outrighted Richmond to their Triple-A affiliate Las Vegas 51s. On October 4, 2012, Richmond elected for free agency.

=== Lotte Giants ===
Richmond signed with the Lotte Giants in the Korea Baseball Organization for the 2013 season. He did not appear in any games for the team and later became a free agent again.

=== Texas Rangers ===
On May 15, 2013, Richmond agreed to a minor league contract with the Texas Rangers. He spent the remainder of the season with the Triple-A Round Rock Express, going 6–7 with a 5.91 ERA in 20 starts. On November 5, he became a free agent.

On February 22, 2014, Richmond signed another minor league contract with the Rangers. He became a free agent after the season.

=== Wichita Wingnuts ===
Richmond signed with the Wichita Wingnuts of the American Association of Independent Professional Baseball for the 2015 season.

=== EDA Rhinos / Fubon Guardians ===
Richmond signed with the EDA Rhinos of the Chinese Professional Baseball League for the 2016 season. He re-signed with the club, renamed the Fubon Guardians, for the 2017 season.

=== Nettuno Baseball Club ===
Richmond signed with the Nettuno Baseball Club of the Italian Baseball League for the 2018 season. Following his time in Italy, it was announced Richmond would pitch the remainder of the Australian Baseball League season for the Auckland Tuatara.

=== Québec Capitales ===
On March 18, 2019, Richmond signed with the Québec Capitales of the Can-Am League.

=== Long Island Ducks ===
On August 30, 2019, Richmond was traded to the Long Island Ducks of the Atlantic League of Professional Baseball. He became a free agent following the season.

== International career ==
He was selected to the Canada national baseball team at the 2009 World Baseball Classic, 2011 Pan American Games, 2015 Pan American Games, 2015 WBSC Premier12, 2017 World Baseball Classic, 2019 Pan American Games Qualifier, 2019 Pan American Games and 2019 WBSC Premier12.

== Personal life ==
Richmond is married and has three daughters. He holds dual citizenship between Canada and New Zealand, as his father was born and raised in New Zealand.
