= Carlos Trujillo (athlete) =

Juan Carlos Trujillo
Personal information
- Born: July 17, 1985 (age 40) Los Angeles, California, U.S.

Sport
- Sport: Athletics (Distance running)
- Event(s): Marathon, 10,000 metres, Half Marathon, Cross Country
- College team: Oregon Ducks

Juan Carlos Trujillo (born July 17, 1985) is an IAAF distance runner who has represented both the US and Guatemala on the international athletics stage. Trujillo has Guatemalan citizenship by descent and American citizenship by birth.

== National and international athletic competitions ==
In August 2016, Trujillo represented Guatemala at the 2016 Summer Olympics in Rio de Janeiro, Brazil; he competed in the men's marathon placed 67th in a field of 155 athletes with a time of 2:20:24.

Trujillo also competed in the 2016 and 2012 USATF Olympic Marathon Trials in Los Angeles, CA, and Houston, TX, respectively; he competed in the 2012 USA Track and Field Olympic Trials in the 10K in Eugene, OR.

In 2014, he ran 2:16: 40 at the Bank of America Chicago Marathon.

He competed in the marathon for the United States of America at the 2013 World Championships in Athletics; he finished 36th.

At the 2013 Fukuoka Marathon in Fukuoka, JPN, he placed 11th.

In 2012, he ran 2:14: 21 at the Bank of America Chicago Marathon.

In 2011, he won the Rock 'n' Roll Seattle Half Marathon.

In 2009, he was the alternate men's member of the US team at the Chiba Ekiden international marathon relay with Ian Burrell, Megan Armstrong (Peyton), Andrew Carlson, Jordan Horn, Jennifer Donovan, and Lindsey Allen—he went in place of alternate Bobby Curtis, who was injured, last minute.

== Collegiate career ==
Trujillo was a Pac-10 Conference champion for the Oregon Ducks track and field team in the 10,000 metres. He also was a member of the national championship cross country team.

== Prep career ==
Trujillo played both soccer and cross country in the fall and ran track and field in the spring in the Idaho High School Athletic Association, 3A division for Middleton High School, in Middleton, Idaho. He won 5 state titles in track and field, but was more focused on playing soccer.
