= Brian Wolfe =

American baseball player (1980–2026)

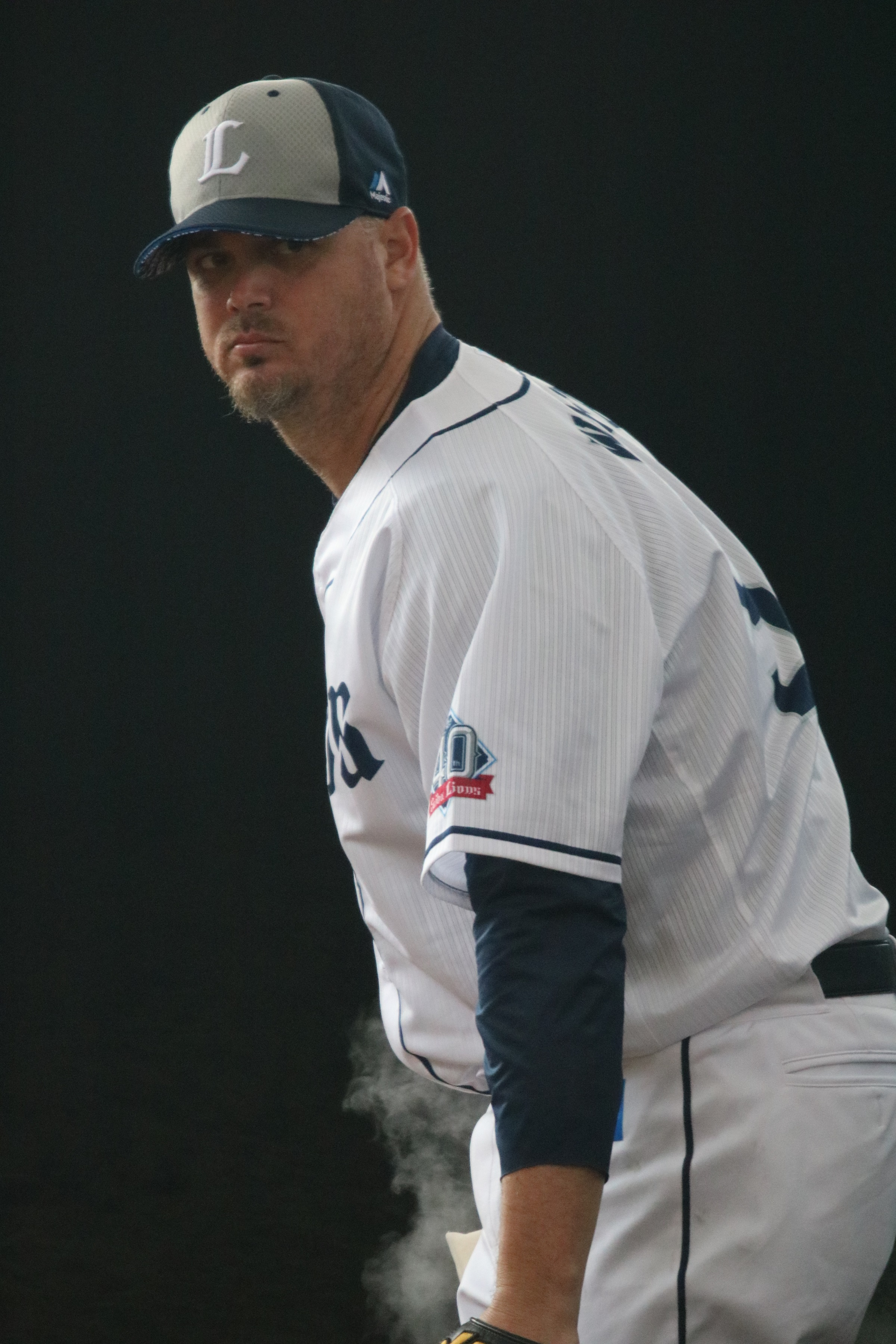
- Wolfe with the Saitama Seibu Lions, 2018
- Pitcher
- Born: November 29, 1980; Fullerton, California, U.S.
- Died: September 15, 2026 (aged 45); Middleton, Idaho, U.S.
- Batted: Right Threw: Right

Professional debut
- MLB: May 30, 2007, for the Toronto Blue Jays
- NPB: March 21, 2010, for the Hokkaido Nippon-Ham Fighters

Last MLB appearance
- October 2, 2009, for the Toronto Blue Jays

MLB statistics
- Win–loss record: 5–5
- Earned run average: 3.81
- Strikeouts: 47

NPB statistics
- Win–loss record: 56–40
- Earned run average: 3.43
- Strikeouts: 414
- Stats at Baseball Reference

Teams
- Toronto Blue Jays (2007–2009); Hokkaido Nippon-Ham Fighters (2010–2013); Fukuoka SoftBank Hawks (2014–2015); Saitama Seibu Lions (2016–2018)

Career highlights and awards
- 2× Japan Series champion (2014, 2015)

Brian Thomas Wolfe (November 29, 1980 – September 15, 2026) was an American professional baseball pitcher who played in Major League Baseball (MLB) for the Toronto Blue Jays, and in Nippon Professional Baseball (NPB) for the Hokkaido Nippon-Ham Fighters, Fukuoka SoftBank Hawks, and Saitama Seibu Lions.

== Career ==
Wolfe was called up by the Blue Jays in 2007 and finished the year with a 3–1 record and 2.98 ERA in 38 relief appearances. During his major league debut, Alex Rodriguez of the New York Yankees may have shouted "Mine!" to distract third baseman Howie Clark from catching an easy pop fly. Clark was unable to catch the baseball because of Rodriguez and a run scored, which was charged to Wolfe. On March 28, 2009, Wolfe was optioned to Triple AAA Las Vegas 51s, and was recalled on May 1, 2009. On December 7, 2009, Wolfe refused a minor league assignment and became a free agent.

On January 8, 2010, Wolfe agreed to a contract with the Hokkaido Nippon-Ham Fighters in the Pacific League of Nippon Professional Baseball.

After termination of contract with Fighters, Wolfe reached a deal with Fukuoka SoftBank Hawks, where he spent two seasons from 2014 to 2015, but pitched only ten games overall due to Tommy John surgery.

On July 20, 2016, Wolfe signed with the Seibu Lions.

== Death ==
Wolfe died in Boise, Idaho on September 15, 2026, at the age of 45. His wife Rachell posted on Facebook that Brian's sudden death followed a "brief difficult and torturous battle". He had three children.
