= Star, Idaho =

City in Idaho, United States

- City
- Seal

- Location of Star in Ada County and Canyon County, Idaho
- Coordinates: 43°42′01″N 116°30′28″W
- Country: United States
- State: Idaho
- Counties: Ada, Canyon
- Established: 1905
- Incorporated: December 10, 1997

Area
  - Total: 7.71 sq mi (19.97 km^{2})
  - Land: 7.66 sq mi (19.84 km^{2})
  - Water: 0.054 sq mi (0.14 km^{2})
- Elevation: 2,471 ft (753 m)

Population (2020)
  - Total: 11,117
  - Estimate (2022): 14,646
  - Density: 1,451/sq mi (560.4/km^{2})
- Time zone: UTC–7 (Mountain (MST))
  - Summer (DST): UTC–6 (MDT)
- ZIP Code: 83669
- Area codes: 208 and 986
- FIPS code: 16-76870
- GNIS feature ID: 2411972
- Website: staridaho.org

Star is a city in northwestern Ada County, Idaho, with parts stretching into neighboring Canyon County. The population was 11,117 at the 2020 census, up from 5,793 in 2010. It was named in the 19th century by travelers on their way to Middleton and Boise who used the star on the school house to find east and west. The name stuck and it became Star, Idaho. Today, it is a rapidly growing suburb of Boise and its schools are shared with Middleton School District and West Ada School District.

Star is part of the Boise metropolitan area.

== Geography ==
Star is located at 43°41′39″N 116°29′25″W (43.694084, -116.490225), at an elevation of 2,470 feet (753 m) above sea level. According to the United States Census Bureau, the city has a total area of 5.86 square miles (15.18 km^{2}), of which 5.82 square miles (15.07 km^{2}) is land and 0.04 square miles (0.10 km^{2}) is water.

== City Council ==
When Star Incorporated on December 10, 1997, the intitial government was set up with a Strong Mayor and six city council members. In 2002, the city council changed this to a Strong Mayor and four city council members.

== Demographics ==
Historical population
Census	Pop.	Note	%±
2000	1,795		—
2010	5,793		222.7%
2020	11,117		91.9%
2022 (est.)	14,646		31.7%
U.S. Decennial Census; 2020 Census

=== 2020 census ===
As of the 2020 census, Star had a population of 11,117. The median age was 40.5 years. 27.6% of residents were under the age of 18 and 18.1% of residents were 65 years of age or older. For every 100 females there were 96.0 males, and for every 100 females age 18 and over there were 95.4 males age 18 and over.

95.4% of residents lived in urban areas, while 4.6% lived in rural areas.

There were 3,923 households in Star, of which 39.1% had children under the age of 18 living in them. Of all households, 69.1% were married-couple households, 10.8% were households with a male householder and no spouse or partner present, and 16.0% were households with a female householder and no spouse or partner present. About 14.3% of all households were made up of individuals and 6.9% had someone living alone who was 65 years of age or older. The average household size was 2.67 people, and 80.1% of occupied housing units were owner-occupied.

There were 4,048 housing units, of which 3.1% were vacant. The homeowner vacancy rate was 1.0% and the rental vacancy rate was 2.0%.

Racial composition as of the 2020 census
Race	Number	Percent
White	9,710	87.3%
Black or African American	38	0.3%
American Indian and Alaska Native	52	0.5%
Asian	99	0.9%
Native Hawaiian and Other Pacific Islander	19	0.2%
Some other race	244	2.2%
Two or more races	955	8.6%
Hispanic or Latino (of any race)	843	7.6%

=== 2010 census ===
As of the 2010 census, there were 5,793 people in 1,927 households, including 1,551 families, in the city. The population density was 995.4 inhabitants per square mile (384.3/km^{2}). There were 2,098 housing units at an average density of 360.5 per square mile (139.2/km^{2}). The racial makeup of the city was 93.5% White, 0.6% African American, 0.8% Native American, 0.6% Asian, 0.1% Pacific Islander, 2.1% from other races, and 2.4% from two or more races. Hispanic or Latino of any race were 6.7%.

Of the 1,927 households 49.9% had children under the age of 18 living with them, 65.7% were married couples living together, 10.5% had a female householder with no husband present, 4.3% had a male householder with no wife present, and 19.5% were non-families. 15.4% of households were one person and 4.9% were one person aged 65 or older. The average household size was 3.00 and the average family size was 3.33.

The median age was 32.3 years. 34.7% of residents were under the age of 18; 5.1% were between the ages of 18 and 24; 30.7% were from 25 to 44; 21.4% were from 45 to 64; and 7.9% were 65 or older. The gender makeup of the city was 49.2% male and 50.8% female.

=== 2000 census ===
As of the census of 2000, there were 1,795 people in 631 households, including 485 families, in the city. The population density was 2,092.5 inhabitants per square mile (807.9/km^{2}). There were 681 housing units at an average density of 793.9 per square mile (306.5/km^{2}). The racial makeup of the city was 92.87% White, 0.28% African American, 0.95% Native American, 0.22% Asian, 0.06% Pacific Islander, 0.89% from other races, and 4.74% from two or more races. Hispanic or Latino of any race were 4.29%.

Of the 631 households 48.0% had children under the age of 18 living with them, 60.2% were married couples living together, 11.7% had a female householder with no husband present, and 23.1% were non-families. 16.8% of households were one person and 4.1% were one person aged 65 or older. The average household size was 2.82 and the average family size was 3.19.

The age distribution was 33.2% under the age of 18, 9.9% from 18 to 24, 36.4% from 25 to 44, 14.8% from 45 to 64, and 5.7% 65 or older. The median age was 28 years. For every 100 females, there were 97.0 males. For every 100 females age 18 and over, there were 92.8 males.

The median household income was $42,337 and the median family income was $46,458. Males had a median income of $31,028 versus $22,625 for females. The per capita income for the city was $15,864. About 5.4% of families and 8.5% of the population were below the poverty line, including 10.7% of those under age 18 and 13.6% of those age 65 or over.

== Education ==
All of Star in Ada County is in the West Ada School District (Meridian Joint School District 2). Most of Star in Canyon County is in the Middleton School District 134 while portions are in the West Ada district.

Residents of both Ada and Canyon counties are in the area (and the taxation zone) for College of Western Idaho.

== Notable people ==
- James A. Brown, football and basketball coach
- Davey Hamilton Jr., racing driver
- Mike Moyle, Speaker of the Idaho House of Representatives
- Lori Otter, wife of Butch Otter and former First Lady of Idaho
