= List of highways of zone 1 (Cuba) =

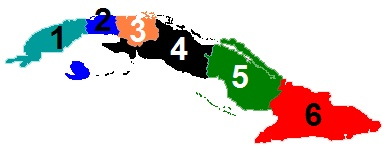
Numbering zones of Cuba

Highways in Cuba in Zone 1 are located in the entirety of the Pinar del Río Province, along with the municipalities of Bahía Honda, Candelaria, and San Cristóbal in Artemisa Province. Until 1976, the border of the zone was the former border of Pinar del Río Province. These roads start with a 1, and are numbered from Highway 1–1 to Highway 1–541, with the numbers roughly going from east to west. These roads were mostly signed during the 1970s, and used on a lot maps until the 2000s, and the former routes where from the 1960s.

== Roads 1-999 ==
Route	Road names	From	To	Notes
1–N–1	Carretera Panamericana; Carretera Central	1–22 in La Fe	2–N–1 on the Candelaria–Artemisa border	
1–I–3	Circuito Norte	1–1 in Mantua	2–I–3 on the Bahía Honda–Mariel border	Former 1–43
1–1	Carretera de Guane; Carretera Guane–Mantua; Carretera a Arroyos de Mantua	1–N–1 in Isabel Rubio	Port of Mantua in Arroyos de Mantua	
1–2	Carretera a la Bajada; Carretera a Maria la Gloria	1–22 in Manuel Lazo	Maria la Gloria resort	
1–22	Carretera de Cortés; Calle Valentín Valdés; Carretera Cortés–Manuel Lazo; Carretera de Manuel Lazo	1–N–1 in La Fe	1–N–1 in Entronque Las Catalinas	Former 1–4
1–111	Carretera de Luis Lazo	1–1 in Guane	1–N–1 in Pinar del Río	Former 1–1
1–121	Carretera Cabezas–Minas de Matahambre; Calle 1ra Carretera Santa Lucia–Minas de Matahambre	1–111 in Cabezas	1–I–3 in La Sabana	Former 1–9
1–122	Carretera a Punta de Cartas	1–N–1 in Morejón	Punta de Cartas	
1–131	Carretera Viñales–Pons	1–121 in Pons	1–241 in Viñales	
1–151		1–N–1 in Santa Cruz de los Pinos	Terminal de Aspiro	
1–152	Carretera a San Luis; Calle Juana Romero	1–N–1 in El Cafetal	1–220 in San Luis	
1–192	Calle Rafael Ferro; Calle Coloma; Carretera Pinar del Rio–La Coloma; Calle Real	Calle Marti in Pinar del Río	Avenida del Puerto in La Coloma	
1–201	Calle Frank Pais; Carretera a Puerto Esperanza	1–I–3 in San Cayetano	Calle 13 de Marzo in Puerto Esperanza	
1–202	Carretera de Playa Las Canas	1–192	Settlement of Playa Las Canas	
1–216	Carretera de Cuba Nueva	1–192 in Seis y Medio de La Coloma	1–232	
1–220		1–152 in San Luis	Farmland in the municipality of Pinar del Río	
1–228		1–192	1–220	
1–232	Carretera a Las Ovas; Calle Marti; Carretera de Briones Montoto; Carretera de La Vega	1–281 / 1–N–1 in Entronque de Las Ovas	1–242	
1–241	Carretera de Viñales	A-4 in Pinar del Río	1–I–3 in Entronque La Palma	Former 1–11
1–242	Carretera a Puerta de Golpe; Calle 26; Calle 25; Calle 12	1–301 / 1–N–1 in Entronque de Pilotos	Calle 25 in Alonso Rojas	
1–252	Carretera Consolación del Sur–Alonso Rojas	1–N–1 in Consolación del Sur	Calle 25 in Alonso Rojas	
1–253	Carretera de Chile	1–241 in La Curva del Tarro	1–341 in La Barra	
1–261	?			
1–262	Calle 20; Carretera a Herradura; Calle 30; Calle Marti	1–341 / 1–N–1 in Entronque de Herradura	Aerodromo Agricola La Jomuca	
1–272	Carretera de Camilo Cienfuegos	1–N–1 in Loma de Candelaria	A-4	
1–282		1–N–1 in Entronque San Diego	Cubanacan	
1–281	Carretera Entronque de Las Ovas–Viñales	1–232 / 1–N–1 in Entronque de Las Ovas	1–241	
1–301	Carretera a Pilotos; Calle 17	1–242 / 1–N–1 in Entronque de Pilotos	Pilotos	
1–307	Carretera a San Andres; Calle Rosita	1–341 in Micons	Calle Maranon	
1–312	Carretera a Los Palacios; Calle 20; Calle 23; Calle 18; Carretera a La Cubana	1–N–1 in Entronque Los Palacios	Aerodromo Agricola La Francia	
1–321	Calle 74	1–N–1 in Consolación del Sur	1–331 in Arroyo de Agua	
1–331	Calle 50B	1–N–1 in Crucero Echeverria	1–321 in Arroyo de Agua	
1–341	Calle 20; Carretera Entronque de Herradura–La Palma; Calle Combandante Jose Antonio Cruz; Calle Marti	1–262 / 1–N–1 in Entronque de Herradura	1–I–3 in La Palma	
1–342	Carretera de Jose Marti	1–N–1 in San Cristobal	Camino a Santa Ana in Jose Marti	
1–371	Carretera de La Guira	Carretera Central in La Guira	1–341 in El Abra	
1–391	Carretera a El Morrillo	Harlem	Playa el Morrillo	
1–421	Carretera Fierro–Niceto Perez; Carretera Central de Montana	1–N–1 in Fierro	1–341 in Arroyo Naranjo	
1–491	Carretera Bahia Honda–San Cristobal	1–N–1 in San Cristobal	1–I–3 in Bahía Honda	
1–521	Carretera Candelaria–Bahía Honda	1–N–1 in Candelaria	1–I–3 near San Diego de Nunez	
1–541	Carretera de Orozco	1–I–3 in Entronque Orozco	Playa San Pedro	

== Motorways ==
Road		From	To	Notes
A4	Autopista La Habana–Pinar del Río; Autopista Este–Oeste	Calle Martí in Pinar del Río	Candelaria–Artemisa border on the bridge over Yaguasa River in Zone 2	
