= 2009 New York Yankees season =

Season for the Major League Baseball team the New York Yankees

2009 New York Yankees
- World Series champions American League champions American League East champions
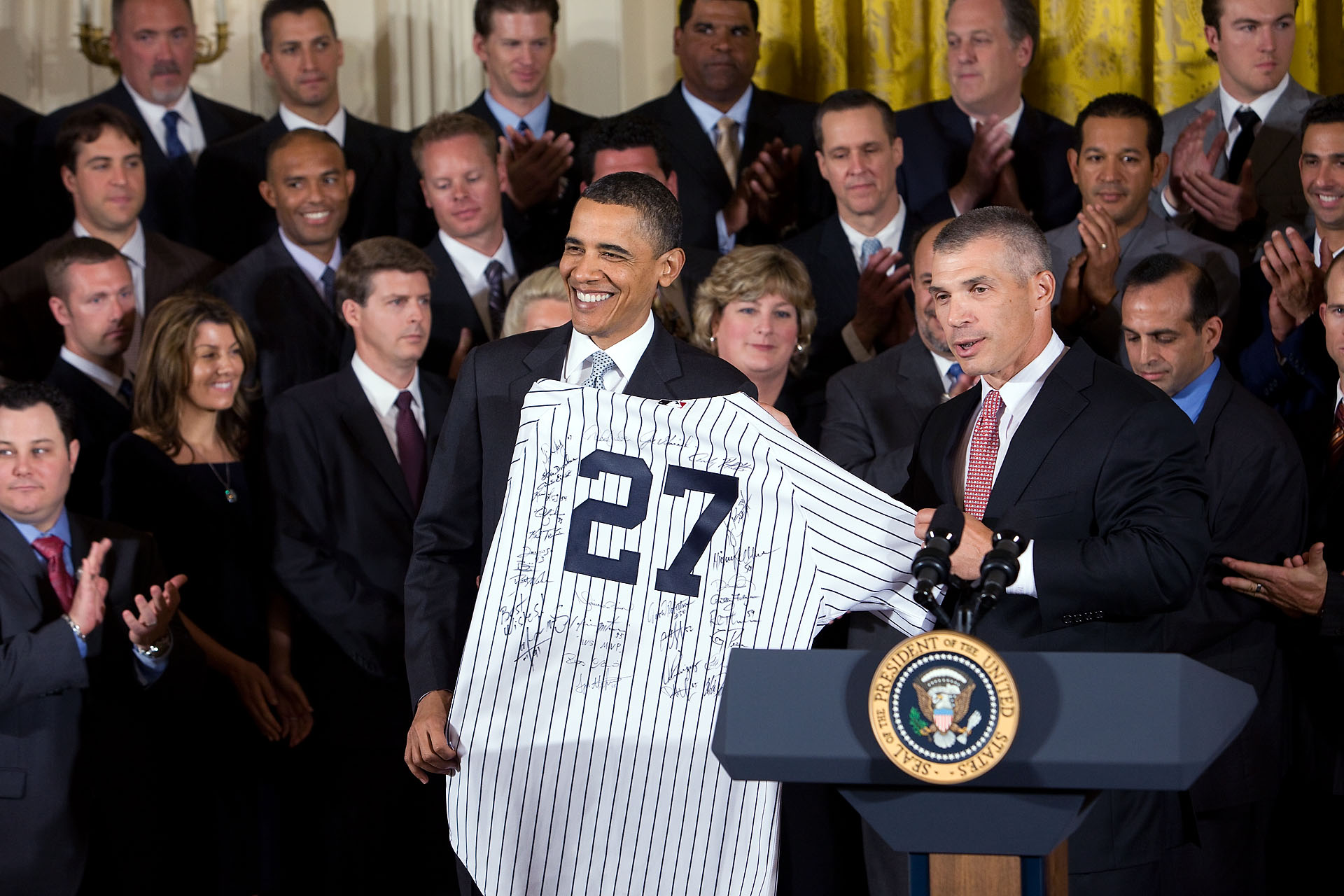
- President Barack Obama meets with the 2009 World Series champion New York Yankees at the White House
- League: American League
- Division: East
- Ballpark: Yankee Stadium
- City: New York
- Record: 103–59 (.636)
- Divisional place: 1st
- Owners: Hal Steinbrenner
- General managers: Brian Cashman
- Managers: Joe Girardi
- Television: YES Network; WWOR-TV (Michael Kay, Ken Singleton, several others as analysts)
- Radio: New York Yankees Radio Network (John Sterling, Suzyn Waldman)

The 2009 New York Yankees season was the 107th season for the New York Yankees franchise. The Yankees opened their new Yankee Stadium on April 3, 2009, when they hosted an exhibition game against the Chicago Cubs. The new stadium hosted its first regular season game on April 16, when the team played against the Cleveland Indians and their first playoff game against the Minnesota Twins in the ALDS on October 7, 2009. The Yankees swept the Twins in three games to win the divisional series. They won their 40th American League pennant on October 25, defeating the Los Angeles Angels of Anaheim in 6 games to advance to the World Series, where they defeated the defending World Series champion Philadelphia Phillies in six games to win their 27th World Series title on November 4. The Yankees finished the regular season with 103 wins and 59 losses, the best record in the majors.

The subsequent season would be the start of a 17-year World Series championship drought for the Yankees (which as of today is still going on), as well as for the city of New York, as the Mets lost the 2015 World Series. The Yankees would not appear in another World Series until 2024.

== Offseason ==
=== Passing of control ===
George Steinbrenner stepped down as the main decision maker for the team on November 20, as Major League Baseball's owners approved passing control to his youngest son, 39-year-old Hal Steinbrenner. The patriarch of the Yankees success over three and a half decades since buying the team from CBS in 1973 had been in failing health, and had been reducing his role in the ownership the last several seasons. Despite his limited role, he remained as a team chairman with his two sons until his death on July 13, 2010.

=== Offseason departures ===
After the Yankees failed to make the playoffs for the first time since 1993, General Manager Brian Cashman made clear that there would be offseason changes. Mike Mussina retired from baseball on November 20, 2008. Infielder Wilson Betemit was traded to the Chicago White Sox in a trade for Nick Swisher on November 13, 2008. The Yankees declined options on first baseman Jason Giambi and starting pitcher Carl Pavano. Giambi went on to sign a one-year deal with the Oakland Athletics on January 1, 2009, and Pavano signed a one-year deal with the Cleveland Indians on January 6, 2009. Right fielder Bobby Abreu signed a one-year contract with the Los Angeles Angels of Anaheim, and catcher Iván Rodríguez signed a one-year pact with the Houston Astros. From those departures, the Yankees shed nearly $89 million from their payroll, enabling them to spend money to fix their team. Furthermore, the Yankees non-tendered the contracts of Chris Britton and Justin Christian, allowing them to become free agents; Britton signed a minor league deal with the San Diego Padres and Christian signed a minor league deal with the Baltimore Orioles.

=== Offseason acquisitions ===
The Yankees began retooling the team, when they acquired first baseman/outfielder Nick Swisher, along with relief prospect Kanekoa Texeira, from the Chicago White Sox for infielder Wilson Betemit, relief prospect Jhonny Núñez and starting pitching prospect Jeff Marquez.

On December 18, 2008, the Yankees announced the signings of starting pitchers CC Sabathia to a 7-year deal worth $161 million and A. J. Burnett to a 5-year deal worth $82.5 million. On January 6, 2009, the Yankees signed first baseman Mark Teixeira to an 8-year deal worth $180 million with a no-trade clause. The signings of Sabathia, Teixeira and Burnett filled the Yankees' biggest needs: starting pitching and first base.

On December 22, the Yankees re-signed Chien-Ming Wang to a 1-year deal worth $5 million, avoiding salary arbitration. They would later reach deals with Brian Bruney, Melky Cabrera and Xavier Nady.

On January 26, the Yankees re-signed Andy Pettitte to a 1-year deal worth $5.5 million contract with performance-based incentives.

The Yankees signed starting pitcher Sergio Mitre to a split (minor/major league) contract, and signed former major leaguers such as Justin Leone, Ángel Berroa, Doug Bernier, Jason Johnson, Kevin Cash, John Rodriguez and Todd Linden; they also acquired catcher Chris Stewart from the White Sox for a player-to-be-named later.

In addition, to prevent them from becoming eligible for the Rule 5 draft, they placed starting pitchers Steven Jackson, Christian Garcia and Michael Dunn, as well as relief pitcher Anthony Claggett, on the 40 man roster.

=== Coaching changes ===
Third base coach and former player Bobby Meacham did not get his contract renewed and special pitching instructor Rich Monteleone was fired as well. Former major leaguer Mick Kelleher was hired as the new first-base coach, with Tony Peña moving to bench coach, and Rob Thomson moving to third-base coach.

=== Controversies ===
In early 2009, before spring training, third baseman Alex Rodriguez admitted to using steroids while playing for the Texas Rangers during the 2001–2003 seasons. This happened right before a hip injury to Rodriguez that required surgery. This kept him out from early March until mid-May. A-Rod would come back with a bang, hitting a three-run homer on the first pitch he saw since early spring training.

Former manager Joe Torre, who at the time was managing with the Los Angeles Dodgers, published a book called The Yankee Years about his time in New York that criticized Steinbrenner, Cashman, and Rodriguez, among others.

== Midseason transactions ==
On June 30, the Yankees traded prospects Eric Fryer and Casey Erickson for OF/3B Eric Hinske of the Pittsburgh Pirates.

On July 31, hours before the trade deadline, the Yankees traded catching prospect Chase Weems to the Cincinnati Reds for 3B Jerry Hairston Jr.

On August 7, 2009, the Yankees traded for pitcher Chad Gaudin for a player to be named later. They traded a player to be named later for Colorado Rockies minor league pitcher Jason Hirsh.

They also signed several minor league free agents throughout the season such as Russ Ortiz, Josh Towers, Brian Peterson and Yurendell de Caster. They also released players such as Jason Johnson, Ángel Berroa, Brett Tomko, Kevin Cash, and Justin Leone. Todd Linden was sold to a Japanese League team per his request.

Steven Jackson was designated for assignment, then claimed off waivers by the Pittsburgh Pirates in May. Jose Veras was designated for assignment and traded to the Cleveland Indians for cash in June. Anthony Claggett was designated for assignment and claimed by the Pirates in September.

=== Roster ===
2009 New York Yankees
Roster
| Pitchers: 91 Alfredo Aceves; 63 Jonathan Albaladejo; 99 Brian Bruney; 34 A. J. Burnett; 62 Joba Chamberlain; 39 Anthony Claggett; 48 Phil Coke; 31 Michael Dunn; 41 Chad Gaudin; 65 Phil Hughes; 38 Ian Kennedy; 43 Dámaso Marte; 39 Mark Melancon; 45 Sergio Mitre; 46 Andy Pettitte; 36 Edwar Ramírez; 42 Mariano Rivera; 30 David Robertson; 52 CC Sabathia; 28 Brett Tomko; 12 Josh Towers; 41 José Veras; 40 Chien-Ming Wang | Catchers: 17 Kevin Cash; 29 Francisco Cervelli; 26 José Molina; 20 Jorge Posada; Infielders: 14 Ángel Berroa; 24 Robinson Canó; 28 Shelley Duncan; 17 Jerry Hairston Jr.; 2 Derek Jeter; 72 Juan Miranda; 19 Ramiro Peña; 29 Cody Ransom; 13 Alex Rodriguez; 25 Mark Teixeira | Outfielders: 53 Melky Cabrera; 18 Johnny Damon; 11 Brett Gardner; 47 Freddy Guzmán; 14 Eric Hinske; 22 Xavier Nady; 33 Nick Swisher; Designated hitters: 55 Hideki Matsui | Manager: 27 Joe Girardi; Coaches: 58 Dave Eiland (pitching); 57 Mike Harkey (bullpen); 50 Mick Kelleher (1st base); 54 Kevin Long (hitting); 56 Tony Peña (bench); 59 Rob Thomson (3rd base) |

== Preseason ==
In March, Alex Rodriguez was diagnosed a hip injury and underwent surgery, sidelining him for 6 to 9 weeks. The Yankees announced that journeyman Cody Ransom would start the season as the third baseman. Ramiro Peña was assigned the back-up infielder spot.

== Regular season ==
=== April ===
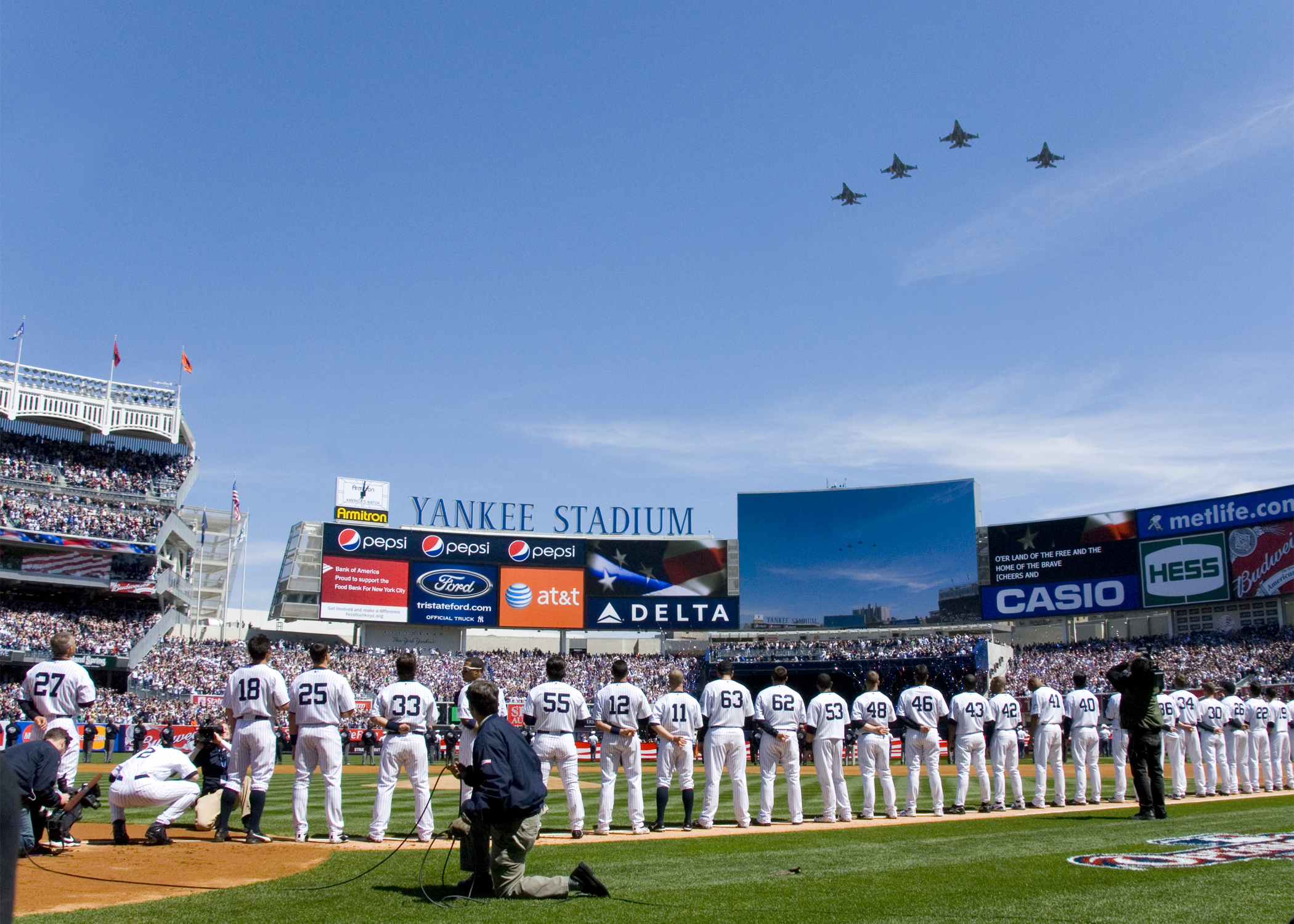
Four F16s from 174th Fighter Wing of the New York Air National Guard Fly Over the New Yankee Stadium on Opening Day on April 16

Playing at Camden Yards, the Yankees lost the first two games of the season due to poor performances by starters CC Sabathia and Chien-Ming Wang. However, they rebounded to take the third game of the series as well as win the next two series they played against the Kansas City Royals and defending AL East champions Tampa Bay Rays. On April 14, Xavier Nady left the game after experiencing elbow pain and was placed on the disabled list; he would later try to rehab from the injury. On April 16, the Yankees played the first game in the new Yankee Stadium, but they lost to the Cleveland Indians 10–2 after the bullpen allowed nine runs in one inning. They managed to split the series despite being outscored 19 to 40. The Yankees were swept later in the month by the rival Boston Red Sox in three games at Fenway Park. The Yankees also placed Chien-Ming Wang, Cody Ransom, and Brian Bruney on the disabled list.

=== May ===
Damaso Marte and Jorge Posada were placed on the disabled list in the first week of the month. In his first game back from the disabled list on May 8, Alex Rodriguez hit a three-run home run on the first pitch he saw of the season, giving the Yankees a 3–0 lead in a game they would go on to win 4–0 with the help of a four-hit shutout by Sabathia. On May 15, 16 and 17, the Yankees had three consecutive walk-off wins against the Twins, including a home run by Rodriguez in his first series at the new Yankee Stadium.

Late in the month, Phil Hughes, who had struggled as a starter, was moved to the bullpen. His addition stabilized the bullpen and helped to turn it from a liability to a strength. He posted a stellar 1.40 ERA as a reliever, serving as a highly effective eighth-inning set-up man for closer Mariano Rivera.

=== June ===
On the first day of June, the Yankees set a Major League record with 18 consecutive errorless games. Late in the month, the Yankees struggled in interleague play, losing two of three to the Nationals and Marlins, falling to five games back in the division. When the Yankees lost the first game of a three-game series against the Atlanta Braves, Yankee GM Brian Cashman flew down to Atlanta to motivate the team in a closed-door meeting. Initially, his words seemed to do little, as in the next game (6/24), the Yankees were no-hit through six innings. After Brett Gardner walked and was picked off at first base–a borderline call by umpire Bill Welke–Joe Girardi protested and was ejected from the baseball game by Welke. The next batter, rookie catcher Francisco Cervelli, hit his first big-league home run to tie the game at 1, and the Yankees went on to win the game 8–4. Many sports analysts viewed this game as a major turning point in the Yankees' season.

=== July ===
The Yankees had a strong July, sweeping the Blue Jays, Twins, Tigers, and Orioles. On July 4, the Yankees clinched a walk-off win with an RBI single from Jorge Posada in the 12th inning. The team emerged on a hot streak after the All-Star break, winning eight consecutive games.

Xavier Nady underwent Tommy John surgery to repair his right elbow, ending his season after spending three months attempting to rehab the injury. At the end of the month, it was revealed that Wang would require season-ending shoulder surgery.

=== August ===
The Yankees took control of the best record in baseball, highlighted by a four-game sweep of their archrivals the Boston Red Sox from August 6–9. Entering the series, the Yankees had lost all 8 games in which they had faced the Red Sox in 2009. During Game 1 of the series, the Yankees pounded Red Sox starter John Smoltz for nine hits, four walks, and eight earned runs in 3.1 IP. Jorge Posada finished a triple shy of the cycle as the Yankees recorded 18 hits total and went on to win 13–6. On Friday night, the second game of the series, it took 15 innings for a run to be recorded in the form of a walk-off two-run home run by Alex Rodriguez. Josh Beckett and AJ Burnett had started the pitchers' duel and each pitched at least seven shutout innings. The Yankees also won the third game of the series on Saturday 5–0 behind CC Sabathia's 7.2 shutout innings. In the series finale on Sunday Night Baseball, Johnny Damon and Mark Teixeira hit back-to-back home runs in the eighth inning to propel the Yankees to a victory. The sweep also gave the Yankees a stranglehold over the American League East and for the rest of the season, no other team would come within five games of first place.

=== September ===
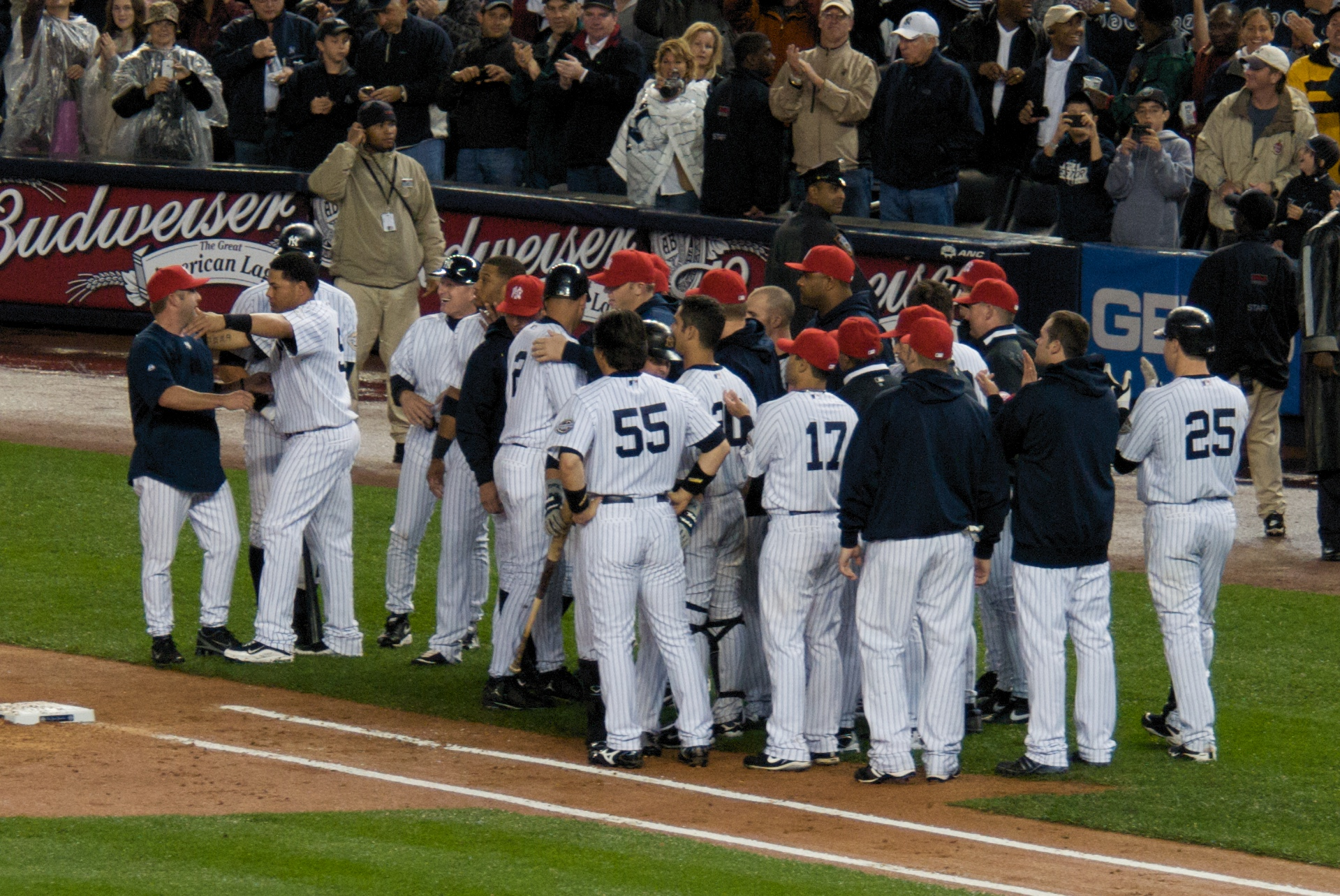
Yankees celebrate Derek Jeter after Jeter breaks record for hits in Yankee history.

Derek Jeter became the all-time hits leader as a member of the Yankees (2,722), passing Lou Gehrig on September 11, 2009. The hit was a single off Baltimore Orioles pitcher Chris Tillman in the 3rd inning. On September 22, 2009, after defeating the Los Angeles Angels, the Yankees became the first team to clinch a playoff spot for the 2009 MLB Postseason. By beating the Boston Red Sox on September 27, the Yankees won their 100th game of the season, and clinched the American League East Division title. This win proved especially significant because the Yankees had started out the season 0–8 against their rivals in Boston, and they ended up splitting the season series 9–9.

=== October ===
On October 4, the last game of the regular season, Alex Rodriguez hit a three-run home run, the 243rd home run of the team's season to date, breaking the team's previously set record in 2004 of 242. Later in the same inning he hit a grand slam, breaking the American League record for most RBI in one inning by a single player, setting it at seven. The last two at-bats of Rodriguez's season allowed him to finish with 30 home runs and 100 RBI.

=== Season standings ===
AL East
| Team | W | L | Pct. | GB | Home | Road |
|---|---|---|---|---|---|---|
| New York Yankees | 103 | 59 | .636 | — | 57‍–‍24 | 46‍–‍35 |
| Boston Red Sox | 95 | 67 | .586 | 8 | 56‍–‍25 | 39‍–‍42 |
| Tampa Bay Rays | 84 | 78 | .519 | 19 | 52‍–‍29 | 32‍–‍49 |
| Toronto Blue Jays | 75 | 87 | .463 | 28 | 44‍–‍37 | 31‍–‍50 |
| Baltimore Orioles | 64 | 98 | .395 | 39 | 39‍–‍42 | 25‍–‍56 |

=== Record vs opponents ===
2009 American League record Source: MLB Standings Grid – 2009
| Team | BAL | BOS | CWS | CLE | DET | KC | LAA | MIN | NYY | OAK | SEA | TB | TEX | TOR | NL |
|---|---|---|---|---|---|---|---|---|---|---|---|---|---|---|---|
| Baltimore | – | 2–16 | 5–4 | 2–5 | 3–5 | 4–4 | 2–8 | 3–2 | 5–13 | 1–5 | 4–5 | 8–10 | 5–5 | 9–9 | 11–7 |
| Boston | 16–2 | – | 4–4 | 7–2 | 6–1 | 5–3 | 4–5 | 4–2 | 9–9 | 5–5 | 2–4 | 9–9 | 2–7 | 11–7 | 11–7 |
| Chicago | 4–5 | 4−4 | – | 10–8 | 9–9 | 9–9 | 5–4 | 6−12 | 3–4 | 4–5 | 4–5 | 6–2 | 2–4 | 1–6 | 12–6 |
| Cleveland | 5–2 | 2–7 | 8–10 | – | 4–14 | 10–8 | 2–4 | 8–10 | 3–5 | 2–5 | 6–4 | 5–3 | 1–8 | 4–4 | 5–13 |
| Detroit | 5–3 | 1–6 | 9–9 | 14–4 | – | 9–9 | 5–4 | 7–12 | 1–5 | 5–4 | 5–4 | 5–2 | 7–2 | 3–5 | 10–8 |
| Kansas City | 4–4 | 3–5 | 9–9 | 8–10 | 9–9 | – | 1–9 | 6–12 | 2–4 | 2–6 | 5–4 | 1–9 | 3–3 | 4–3 | 8–10 |
| Los Angeles | 8–2 | 5–4 | 4–5 | 4–2 | 4–5 | 9–1 | – | 6–4 | 5–5 | 12–7 | 10–9 | 4–2 | 8–11 | 4–4 | 14–4 |
| Minnesota | 2–3 | 2–4 | 12–6 | 10–8 | 12–7 | 12–6 | 4–6 | – | 0–7 | 4–6 | 5–5 | 3–3 | 6–4 | 3–5 | 12–6 |
| New York | 13–5 | 9–9 | 4–3 | 5–3 | 5–1 | 4–2 | 5–5 | 7–0 | – | 7–2 | 6–4 | 11–7 | 5–4 | 12–6 | 10–8 |
| Oakland | 5–1 | 5–5 | 5–4 | 5–2 | 4–5 | 6–2 | 7–12 | 6–4 | 2–7 | – | 5–14 | 6–4 | 11–8 | 3–6 | 5–13 |
| Seattle | 5–4 | 4–2 | 5–4 | 4–6 | 4–5 | 4–5 | 9–10 | 5–5 | 4–6 | 14–5 | – | 5–3 | 8–11 | 3–4 | 11–7 |
| Tampa Bay | 10–8 | 9–9 | 2–6 | 3–5 | 2–5 | 9–1 | 2–4 | 3–3 | 7–11 | 4–6 | 3–5 | – | 3–6 | 14–4 | 13–5 |
| Texas | 5–5 | 7–2 | 4–2 | 8–1 | 2–7 | 3–3 | 11–8 | 4–6 | 4–5 | 8–11 | 11–8 | 6–3 | – | 5–5 | 9–9 |
| Toronto | 9–9 | 7–11 | 6–1 | 4–4 | 5–3 | 3–4 | 4–4 | 5–3 | 6–12 | 6–3 | 4–3 | 4–14 | 5–5 | – | 7–11 |

- Source: MLB Standings Grid – 2009

=== Game log ===
Legend
| Yankees win | Yankees loss | Game postponed |

2009 game log
April (12–10)

| # | Date | Opponent | Score | Win | Loss | Save | Attendance | Record |
|---|---|---|---|---|---|---|---|---|
| 1 | April 6 | @ Orioles | 10–5 | Guthrie (1–0) | Sabathia (0–1) | | 48,607 | 0–1 |
| 2 | April 8 | @ Orioles | 7–5 | Uehara (1–0) | Wang (0–1) | Sherrill (1) | 22,856 | 0–2 |
| 3 | April 9 | @ Orioles | 11–2 | Burnett (1–0) | Simón (0–1) | | 28,534 | 1–2 |
| 4 | April 10 | @ Royals | 4–1 | Pettitte (1–0) | Ponson (0–1) | Rivera (1) | 38,098 | 2–2 |
| 5 | April 11 | @ Royals | 6–1 | Sabathia (1–1) | H. Ramírez (0–1) | | 31,271 | 3–2 |
| 6 | April 12 | @ Royals | 6–4 | Cruz (1–0) | Coke (0–1) | Soria (3) | 17,629 | 3–3 |
| 7 | April 13 | @ Rays | 15–5 | Kazmir (2–0) | Wang (0–2) | | 36,973 | 3–4 |
| 8 | April 14 | @ Rays | 7–2 | Burnett (2–0) | Howell (0–1) | | 36,973 | 4–4 |
| 9 | April 15 | @ Rays | 4–3 | Bruney (1–0) | Percival (0–1) | Rivera (2) | 25,171 | 5–4 |
| 10 | April 16 | Indians | 10–2 | Lee (1–2) | Veras (0–1) | | 48,271 | 5–5 |
| 11 | April 17 | Indians | 6–5 | Bruney (2–0) | Lewis (1–1) | Rivera (3) | 45,101 | 6–5 |
| 12 | April 18 | Indians | 22–4 | Carmona (1–2) | Wang (0–3) | | 45,167 | 6–6 |
| 13 | April 19 | Indians | 7–3 | Albaladejo (1–0) | Lewis (1–2) | | 43,068 | 7–6 |
| | April 20 | Athletics | Postponed (rain). Rescheduled for July 23 | | | | | |
| 14 | April 21 | Athletics | 5–3 | Pettitte (2–0) | Eveland (0–1) | Rivera (4) | 42,065 | 8–6 |
| 15 | April 22 | Athletics | 9–7 (14) | Veras (1–1) | Giese (0–2) | | 43,342 | 9–6 |
| 16 | April 24 | @ Red Sox | 5–4 (11) | R. Ramírez (2–0) | Marte (0–1) | | 38,163 | 9–7 |
| 17 | April 25 | @ Red Sox | 16–11 | Okajima (1–0) | Albaladejo (1–1) | | 37,699 | 9–8 |
| 18 | April 26 | @ Red Sox | 4–1 | Masterson (2–0) | Pettitte (2–1) | Saito (2) | 38,154 | 9–9 |
| 19 | April 27 | @ Tigers | 4–2 | Verlander (1–2) | Sabathia (1–2) | | 28,784 | 9–10 |
| 20 | April 28 | @ Tigers | 11–0 | Hughes (1–0) | Perry (0–1) | | 25,519 | 10–10 |
| 21 | April 29 | @ Tigers | 8–6 | Chamberlain (1–0) | Porcello (1–3) | | 28,348 | 11–10 |
| 22 | April 30 | Angels | 7–4 | Coke (1–1) | Speier (0–1) | Rivera (5) | 43,388 | 12–10 |

May (17–11)

| # | Date | Opponent | Score | Win | Loss | Save | Attendance | Record |
|---|---|---|---|---|---|---|---|---|
| 23 | May 1 | Angels | 10–9 | Albaladejo (2–1) | Fuentes (0–2) | | 44,058 | 13–10 |
| 24 | May 2 | Angels | 8–4 | Palmer (2–0) | Sabathia (1–3) | | 44,970 | 13–11 |
| | May 3 | Angels | Postponed (rain) Rescheduled for September 14 | | | | | |
| 25 | May 4 | Red Sox | 6–4 | Lester (2–2) | Hughes (1–1) | Papelbon (7) | 46,426 | 13–12 |
| 26 | May 5 | Red Sox | 7–3 | Beckett (3–2) | Chamberlain (1–1) | | 46,810 | 13–13 |
| 27 | May 6 | Rays | 4–3 (10) | Balfour (1–0) | Coke (1–2) | Percival (5) | 42,585 | 13–14 |
| 28 | May 7 | Rays | 8–6 | Shouse (1–0) | Rivera (0–1) | Nelson (1) | 43,769 | 13–15 |
| 29 | May 8 | @ Orioles | 4–0 | Sabathia (2–3) | Guthrie (2–3) | | 36,926 | 14–15 |
| 30 | May 9 | @ Orioles | 12–5 | Eaton (2–3) | Hughes (1–2) | | 41,825 | 14–16 |
| 31 | May 10 | @ Orioles | 5–3 | Chamberlain (2–1) | Johnson (2–1) | Rivera (6) | 33,290 | 15–16 |
| 32 | May 12 | @ Blue Jays | 5–1 | Halladay (7–1) | Burnett (2–1) | | 43,737 | 15–17 |
| 33 | May 13 | @ Blue Jays | 8–2 | Pettitte (3–1) | Richmond (4–2) | | 20,164 | 16–17 |
| 34 | May 14 | @ Blue Jays | 3–2 | Sabathia (3–3) | Carlson (0–2) | Rivera (7) | 22,667 | 17–17 |
| 35 | May 15 | Twins | 5–4 | Veras (2–1) | Nathan (1–1) | | 43,856 | 18–17 |
| 36 | May 16 | Twins | 6–4 (11) | Aceves (1–0) | Breslow (1–2) | | 45,455 | 19–17 |
| 37 | May 17 | Twins | 3–2 (10) | Aceves (2–0) | Crain (2–2) | | 44,804 | 20–17 |
| 38 | May 18 | Twins | 7–6 | Pettitte (4–1) | Perkins (1–3) | Coke (1) | 43,244 | 21–17 |
| 39 | May 19 | Orioles | 9–1 | Sabathia (4–3) | Bergesen (1–2) | | 42,838 | 22–17 |
| 40 | May 20 | Orioles | 11–4 | Hughes (2–2) | Guthrie (3–4) | Rivera (8) | 43,903 | 23–17 |
| 41 | May 21 | Orioles | 7–4 | Aceves (3–0) | Eaton (2–5) | Rivera (9) | 43,342 | 24–17 |
| 42 | May 22 | Phillies | 7–3 | Myers (4–2) | Burnett (2–2) | | 46,288 | 24–18 |
| 43 | May 23 | Phillies | 5–4 | Veras (3–1) | Lidge (0–2) | | 46,889 | 25–18 |
| 44 | May 24 | Phillies | 4–3 (11) | Condrey (4–0) | Tomko (0–1) | | 46,986 | 25–19 |
| 45 | May 25 | @ Rangers | 11–1 | Hughes (3–2) | Harrison (4–4) | | 48,914 | 26–19 |
| 46 | May 26 | @ Rangers | 7–3 | Jennings (2–1) | Aceves (3–1) | | 33,397 | 26–20 |
| 47 | May 27 | @ Rangers | 9–2 | Burnett (3–2) | Holland (1–2) | | 38,409 | 27–20 |
| 48 | May 29 | @ Indians | 3–1 | Pettitte (5–1) | Lee (2–6) | Rivera (10) | 32,802 | 28–20 |
| 49 | May 30 | @ Indians | 10–5 | Sabathia (5–3) | Carmona (2–5) | | 34,396 | 29–20 |
| 50 | May 31 | @ Indians | 5–4 | Wood (2–2) | Coke (1–3) | | 29, 405 | 29–21 |

June (15–11)

| # | Date | Opponent | Score | Win | Loss | Save | Attendance | Record |
|---|---|---|---|---|---|---|---|---|
| 51 | June 1 | @ Indians | 5–2 | Chamberlain (3–1) | Aquino (1–1) | Rivera (11) | 23,651 | 30–21 |
| 52 | June 2 | Rangers | 12–3 | Burnett (4–2) | Padilla (3–3) | | 43,948 | 31–21 |
| 53 | June 3 | Rangers | 4–2 | Feldman (5–0) | Pettitte (5–2) | Francisco (12) | 44,452 | 31–22 |
| 54 | June 4 | Rangers | 8–6 | Robertson (1–0) | Wilson (3–3) | Rivera (12) | 45,713 | 32–22 |
| | June 5 | Rays | Postponed (rain) Rescheduled for September 7 | | | | | |
| 55 | June 6 | Rays | 9–7 | Howell (1–2) | Rivera (0–2) | Choate (3) | 46,205 | 32–23 |
| 56 | June 7 | Rays | 4–3 | Aceves (4–1) | Balfour (2–1) | Rivera (13) | 46,465 | 33–23 |
| 57 | June 8 | Rays | 5–3 | Pettitte (6–2) | Sonnanstine (4–6) | Rivera (14) | 44,706 | 34–23 |
| 58 | June 9 | @ Red Sox | 7–0 | Beckett (7–2) | Burnett (4–3) | | 37,883 | 34–24 |
| 59 | June 10 | @ Red Sox | 6–5 | Wakefield (8–3) | Wang (0–4) | Papelbon (15) | 38,121 | 34–25 |
| 60 | June 11 | @ Red Sox | 4–3 | Saito (1–0) | Sabathia (5–4) | Papelbon (16) | 38,153 | 34–26 |
| 61 | June 12 | Mets | 9–8 | Rivera (1–2) | Rodríguez (1–1) | | 47,967 | 35–26 |
| 62 | June 13 | Mets | 6–2 | Nieve (1–0) | Pettitte (6–3) | | 48,056 | 35–27 |
| 63 | June 14 | Mets | 15–0 | Burnett (5–3) | Santana (8–4) | | 47,943 | 36–27 |
| 64 | June 16 | Nationals | 5–3 | Sabathia (6–4) | Villone (3–4) | Rivera (15) | 44,873 | 37–27 |
| 65 | June 17 | Nationals | 3–2 | Lannan (4–5) | Wang (0–5) | MacDougal (1) | 46,052 | 37–28 |
| 66 | June 18 | Nationals | 3–0 | Stammen (1–2) | Chamberlain (3–2) | MacDougal (2) | 45,143 | 37–29 |
| 67 | June 19 | @ Marlins | 5–1 | Pettitte (7–3) | West (2–2) | | 35,027 | 38–29 |
| 68 | June 20 | @ Marlins | 2–1 | Johnson (7–1) | Burnett (5–4) | Lindstrom (13) | 46,427 | 38–30 |
| 69 | June 21 | @ Marlins | 6–5 | Volstad (5–7) | Tomko (0–2) | Lindstrom (14) | 35,827 | 38–31 |
| 70 | June 23 | @ Braves | 4–0 | Hanson (3–0) | Wang (0–6) | | 40,828 | 38–32 |
| 71 | June 24 | @ Braves | 8–4 | Chamberlain (4–2) | Medlen (2–3) | Rivera (16) | 42,315 | 39–32 |
| 72 | June 25 | @ Braves | 11–7 | Aceves (5–1) | Lowe (7–6) | Rivera (17) | 47,508 | 40–32 |
| 73 | June 26 | @ Mets | 9–1 | Sabathia (7–4) | Pelfrey (5–3) | | 41,278 | 41–32 |
| 74 | June 27 | @ Mets | 5–0 | Burnett (6–4) | Redding (1–3) | | 41,302 | 42–32 |
| 75 | June 28 | @ Mets | 4–2 | Wang (1–6) | Hernández (5–3) | Rivera (18) | 41,315 | 43–32 |
| 76 | June 30 | Mariners | 8–5 | Bruney (3–0) | White (2–1) | Rivera (19) | 46,181 | 44–32 |

July (18–9)

| # | Date | Opponent | Score | Win | Loss | Save | Attendance | Record |
|---|---|---|---|---|---|---|---|---|
| 77 | July 1 | Mariners | 4–2 | Pettitte (8–3) | Washburn (4–6) | Rivera (20) | 45,285 | 45–32 |
| 78 | July 2 | Mariners | 8–4 | Batista (5–2) | Sabathia (7–5) | | 46,142 | 45–33 |
| 79 | July 3 | Blue Jays | 4–2 | Burnett (7–4) | Tallet (5–6) | Rivera (21) | 46,308 | 46–33 |
| 80 | July 4 | Blue Jays | 6–5 (12) | Tomko (1–2) | Camp (0–4) | | 46,620 | 47–33 |
| 81 | July 5 | Blue Jays | 10–8 | Albaladejo (3–1) | Ryan (1–1) | Aceves (1) | 46,320 | 48–33 |
| 82 | July 6 | Blue Jays | 7–6 | Romero (7–3) | Pettitte (8–4) | Frasor (3) | 46,450 | 48–34 |
| 83 | July 7 | @ Twins | 10–2 | Sabathia (8–5) | Baker (6–7) | | 29,540 | 49–34 |
| 84 | July 8 | @ Twins | 4–3 | Burnett (8–4) | Swarzak (2–3) | Rivera (22) | 38,115 | 50–34 |
| 85 | July 9 | @ Twins | 6–4 | Albaladejo (4–1) | Liriano (4–9) | Rivera (23) | 40,142 | 51–34 |
| 86 | July 10 | @ Angels | 10–6 | Bulger (4–1) | Melancon (0–1) | Fuentes (25) | 44,076 | 51–35 |
| 87 | July 11 | @ Angels | 14–8 | Weaver (10–3) | Pettitte (8–5) | | 42,602 | 51–36 |
| 88 | July 12 | @ Angels | 5–4 | Lackey (4–4) | Sabathia (8–6) | Fuentes (26) | 41,532 | 51–37 |
All-Star Break: AL defeats NL, 4–3
| 89 | July 17 | Tigers | 5–3 | Hughes (4–2) | Zumaya (3–3) | Rivera (24) | 46,197 | 52–37 |
| 90 | July 18 | Tigers | 2–1 | Sabathia (9–6) | Verlander (10–5) | Rivera (25) | 46,423 | 53–37 |
| 91 | July 19 | Tigers | 2–1 | Chamberlain (5–2) | Jackson (7–5) | Rivera (26) | 46,937 | 54–37 |
| 92 | July 20 | Orioles | 2–1 | Aceves (6–1) | Johnson (3–4) | | 46,342 | 55–37 |
| 93 | July 21 | Orioles | 6–4 | Mitre (1–0) | Hill (3–3) | Rivera (27) | 45,589 | 56–37 |
| 94 | July 22 | Orioles | 6–4 | Burnett (9–4) | Berken (1–8) | Rivera (28) | 47,134 | 57–37 |
| 95 | July 23 | Athletics | 6–3 | Sabathia (10–6) | Mazzaro (2–7) | Hughes (1) | 44,206 | 58–37 |
| 96 | July 24 | Athletics | 8–3 | Chamberlain (6–2) | Anderson (5–8) | | 46,086 | 59–37 |
| 97 | July 25 | Athletics | 6–4 | Gonzalez (2–2) | Pettitte (8–6) | Bailey (11) | 46,412 | 59–38 |
| 98 | July 26 | Athletics | 7–5 | Coke (2–3) | Braden (7–9) | Rivera (29) | 46,163 | 60–38 |
| 99 | July 27 | @ Rays | 11–4 | Burnett (10–4) | Shields (6–7) | Robertson (1) | 33,442 | 61–38 |
| 100 | July 28 | @ Rays | 6–2 | Kazmir (5–6) | Sabathia (10–7) | | 32,304 | 61–39 |
| 101 | July 29 | @ Rays | 6–2 | Chamberlain (7–2) | Garza (7–8) | | 32,398 | 62–39 |
| 102 | July 30 | @ White Sox | 3–2 | Thornton (5–2) | Hughes (4–3) | | 31,305 | 62–40 |
| 103 | July 31 | @ White Sox | 10–5 | Peña (6–3) | Robertson (1–1) | | 38,228 | 62–41 |

August (21–7)

| # | Date | Opponent | Score | Win | Loss | Save | Attendance | Record |
|---|---|---|---|---|---|---|---|---|
| 104 | August 1 | @ White Sox | 14–4 | Danks (9–7) | Burnett (10–5) | | 38,763 | 62–42 |
| 105 | August 2 | @ White Sox | 8–5 | Sabathia (11–7) | Buehrle (11–5) | Rivera (30) | 36,325 | 63–42 |
| 106 | August 4 | @ Blue Jays | 5–3 | Pettitte (9–6) | Halladay (11–5) | Rivera (31) | 33,669 | 64–42 |
| 107 | August 5 | @ Blue Jays | 8–4 | Aceves (7–1) | Rzepczynski (1–3) | | 31,402 | 65–42 |
| 108 | August 6 | Red Sox | 13–6 | Chamberlain (8–2) | Smoltz (2–5) | | 49,005 | 66–42 |
| 109 | August 7 | Red Sox | 2–0 (15) | Coke (3–3) | Tazawa (0–1) | | 48,262 | 67–42 |
| 110 | August 8 | Red Sox | 5–0 | Sabathia (12–7) | Buchholz (1–2) | | 48,796 | 68–42 |
| 111 | August 9 | Red Sox | 5–2 | Coke (4–3) | Bard (0–1) | Rivera (32) | 48,190 | 69–42 |
| 112 | August 10 | Blue Jays | 5–4 | Camp (1–5) | Mitre (1–1) | Frasor (5) | 46,376 | 69–43 |
| 113 | August 11 | Blue Jays | 7–5 | Robertson (2–1) | Carlson (1–5) | Rivera (33) | 46,523 | 70–43 |
| 114 | August 12 | Blue Jays | 4–3 (11) | Gaudin (1–0) | Camp (1–6) | | 47,113 | 71–43 |
| 115 | August 13 | @ Mariners | 11–1 | Sabathia (13–7) | Snell (0–1) | | 33,585 | 72–43 |
| 116 | August 14 | @ Mariners | 4–2 | Hughes (5–3) | Lowe (1–5) | Rivera (34) | 36,769 | 73–43 |
| 117 | August 15 | @ Mariners | 5–2 | Mitre (2–1) | French (2–3) | Rivera (35) | 44,272 | 74–43 |
| 118 | August 16 | @ Mariners | 10–3 | Fister (1–0) | Chamberlain (8–3) | | 45,210 | 74–44 |
| 119 | August 17 | @ Athletics | 3–0 | Tomko (2–2) | Burnett (10–6) | Bailey (18) | 24,409 | 74–45 |
| 120 | August 18 | @ Athletics | 7–2 | Sabathia (14–7) | Marshall (0–1) | | 25,383 | 75–45 |
| 121 | August 19 | @ Athletics | 3–2 | Aceves (8–1) | Anderson (7–9) | Rivera (36) | 35,067 | 76–45 |
| 122 | August 21 | @ Red Sox | 20–11 | Pettitte (10–6) | Penny (7–8) | | 37,869 | 77–45 |
| 123 | August 22 | @ Red Sox | 14–1 | Tazawa (2–2) | Burnett (10–7) | | 37,277 | 77–46 |
| 124 | August 23 | @ Red Sox | 8–4 | Sabathia (15–7) | Beckett (14–5) | | 38,008 | 78–46 |
| 125 | August 25 | Rangers | 10–9 | Millwood (10–8) | Chamberlain (8–4) | | 46,511 | 78–47 |
| 126 | August 26 | Rangers | 9–2 | Pettitte (11–6) | Holland (7–8) | | 46,461 | 79–47 |
| 127 | August 27 | Rangers | 7–2 | Grilli (2–3) | Burnett (10–8) | | 47,209 | 79–48 |
| 128 | August 28 | White Sox | 5–2 (10) | Bruney (4–0) | Williams (0–1) | | 46,318 | 80–48 |
| 129 | August 29 | White Sox | 10–0 | Mitre (3–1) | Contreras (5–13) | | 46,193 | 81–48 |
| 130 | August 30 | White Sox | 8–3 | Aceves (9–1) | García (0–2) | | 46,664 | 82–48 |
| 131 | August 31 | @ Orioles | 5–1 | Pettitte (12–6) | Guthrie (9–13) | Rivera (37) | 25,063 | 83–48 |

September (19–9)

| # | Date | Opponent | Score | Win | Loss | Save | Attendance | Record |
|---|---|---|---|---|---|---|---|---|
| 132 | September 1 | @ Orioles | 9–6 | Marte (1–1) | Ray (0–3) | Rivera (38) | 25,782 | 84–48 |
| 133 | September 2 | @ Orioles | 10–2 | Sabathia (16–7) | Mickolio (0–2) | Hughes (2) | 21,126 | 85–48 |
| 134 | September 3 | @ Blue Jays | 10–5 | Aceves (10–1) | Romero (11–7) | | 22,773 | 86–48 |
| 135 | September 4 | @ Blue Jays | 6–0 | Halladay (14–8) | Chamberlain (8–5) | | 22,179 | 86–49 |
| 136 | September 5 | @ Blue Jays | 6–4 | Pettitte (13–6) | Cecil (6–4) | Hughes (3) | 31,295 | 87–49 |
| 137 | September 6 | @ Blue Jays | 14–8 | Tallet (6–9) | Mitre (3–2) | | 30,873 | 87–50 |
| 138 | September 7 | Rays | 4–1 | Hughes (6–3) | Cormier (2–2) | Rivera (39) | 47,436 | 88–50 |
| 139 | September 7 | Rays | 11–1 | Burnett (11–8) | Sonnanstine (6–9) | | 45,953 | 89–50 |
| 140 | September 8 | Rays | 3–2 | Rivera (2–2) | Wheeler (4–4) | | 45,350 | 90–50 |
| 141 | September 9 | Rays | 4–2 | Albaladejo (5–1) | Cormier (2–3) | Coke (2) | 45,848 | 91–50 |
| 142 | September 11 | Orioles | 10–4 | Tillman (2–3) | Marte (1–2) | Hendrickson (1) | 46,771 | 91–51 |
| 143 | September 12 | Orioles | 7–3 | Matsuz (5–2) | Burnett (11–9) | | 46,497 | 91–52 |
| 144 | September 13 | Orioles | 13–3 | Sabathia (17–7) | Guthrie (10–14) | | 46,413 | 92–52 |
| 145 | September 14 | Angels | 5–3 | Hughes (7–3) | Weaver (15–6) | Rivera (40) | 44,701 | 93–52 |
| 146 | September 15 | Blue Jays | 10–4 | Halladay (15–9) | Mitre (3–3) | | 45,847 | 93–53 |
| 147 | September 16 | Blue Jays | 5–4 | Rivera (3–2) | Frasor (6–3) | | 46,046 | 94–53 |
| 148 | September 18 | @ Mariners | 3–2 | Hernández (16–5) | Rivera (3–3) | | 28,395 | 94–54 |
| 149 | September 19 | @ Mariners | 10–1 | Sabathia (18–7) | Fister (2–3) | | 43,173 | 95–54 |
| 150 | September 20 | @ Mariners | 7–1 | Snell (7–10) | Chamberlain (8–6) | | 35,885 | 95–55 |
| 151 | September 21 | @ Angels | 5–2 | Saunders (14–7) | Pettitte (13–7) | Fuentes (44) | 38,667 | 95–56 |
| 152 | September 22 | @ Angels | 6–5 | Hughes (8–3) | Palmer (10–2) | Rivera (41) | 40,374 | 96–56 |
| 153 | September 23 | @ Angels | 3–2 | Burnett (12–9) | Kazmir (9–9) | Rivera (42) | 35,760 | 97–56 |
| 154 | September 25 | Red Sox | 9–5 | Chamberlain (9–6) | Lester (14–8) | | 48,449 | 98–56 |
| 155 | September 26 | Red Sox | 3–0 | Sabathia (19–7) | Matsuzaka (3–6) | Rivera (43) | 48,809 | 99–56 |
| 156 | September 27 | Red Sox | 4–2 | Pettitte (14–7) | Byrd (1–3) | Rivera (44) | 47,576 | 100–56 |
| 157 | September 28 | Royals | 8–2 | Gaudin (2–0) | Hochevar (7–12) | | 45,348 | 101–56 |
| 158 | September 29 | Royals | 4–3 | Bruney (5–0) | Farnsworth (1–5) | | 44,794 | 102–56 |
| 159 | September 30 | Royals | 4–3 | Wright (3–5) | Marte (1–3) | Soria (30) | 46,956 | 102–57 |

October (1–2)

| # | Date | Opponent | Score | Win | Loss | Save | Attendance | Record |
|---|---|---|---|---|---|---|---|---|
| 160 | October 2 | @ Rays | 13–4 | Price (10–7) | Sabathia (19–8) | | 22,704 | 102–58 |
| 161 | October 3 | @ Rays | 5–3 | Niemann (13–6) | Pettitte (14–8) | Balfour (4) | 30,084 | 102–59 |
| 162 | October 4 | @ Rays | 10–2 | Burnett (13–9) | Davis (2–2) | | 28,699 | 103–59 |

== Postseason ==
=== ALDS ===
The Yankees defeated the Minnesota Twins in the Division Series, 3 games to 0. The two teams previously met in the 2003 and 2004 Division Series, with the Yankees winning both series in four games.

The Yankees won Game 1 behind a strong start from CC Sabathia, a pivotal two-run home run by Derek Jeter, two huge RBI singles by Alex Rodriguez and a two-run homer by Hideki Matsui.

Trailing 3–1 in the bottom of the 9th inning of Game 2, Alex Rodriguez hit a game-tying two-run homer off Twins closer Joe Nathan. David Robertson escaped a bases-loaded, no out jam in the Top of the 11th, and Mark Teixeira lined a walk-off home run off José Mijares to lead off the bottom half to give the Yankees a 4–3 win.

Former Yankee Carl Pavano threw shutout ball through 6 innings in Game 3 in what would turn out to be the final baseball game ever played at Hubert H. Humphrey Metrodome. However, in the top of the 7th, Rodriguez and Jorge Posada each hit a home run to give the Yankees a 2–1 lead. In the bottom of the 8th, the Twins' Nick Punto made a wide turn at 3rd base after a Denard Span infield single with no one out, and was thrown out attempting to retreat back, killing the Twins' threat. The Yankees tacked on two insurance runs in the top of the 9th, and Mariano Rivera shut the door in the 9th to give the Yankees their first postseason series victory since the 2004 ALDS.

Rodriguez played a pivotal role in the Division Series, hitting two home runs (both of which were game-tying), batting .455 (5-for-11), and collecting 6 RBI. Before 2009, Rodriguez had only 4 postseason home runs in a Yankee uniform, and hadn't batted above .300 in a postseason since 2004.

=== ALCS ===
The Yankees defeated the Los Angeles Angels in six games in the ALCS. This marked the franchise's 40th American League pennant, and the first time the Yankees had defeated the Angels in a postseason series. Yankees ace CC Sabathia was named ALCS MVP, with a 2–0 record and 1.13 ERA in two starts against the Angels.

Sabathia hurled 8 brilliant innings in a Game 1 4–1 Yankee victory, helped by three uncharacteristic Angels errors.

In a classic Game 2, the score remained tied at 2 heading to the 11th inning. In the top half, Chone Figgins broke out of his postseason slump by blooping an RBI single to left field to score Gary Matthews Jr. and give the Angels a 3–2 lead. However, in the bottom half, Alex Rodriguez lined a home run into the short right-field porch off Angels closer Brian Fuentes to tie the game at 3. In the bottom of the 13th, Maicer Izturis threw away a potential double play ball from Melky Cabrera to score Jerry Hairston Jr. with the winning run, giving the Yankees a 2–0 series lead.

The Angels returned the favor in Game 3 with a walk-off win of their own. Vladimir Guerrero hit a huge game tying two-run homer off Andy Pettitte with two out in the bottom of the 6th, and Jeff Mathis laced a game-winning RBI double in the bottom of the 11th to win the game for the Angels, 5–4. This came after a controversial decision from manager Joe Girardi to lift David Robertson for Alfredo Aceves with two out and no one on in the 11th. Aceves served up a single to Howie Kendrick, followed by the Mathis double. Four solo home runs accounted for the Yankees' scoring, hit by Derek Jeter, Rodriguez, Johnny Damon and Jorge Posada.

Sabathia threw 8 more brilliant innings in Game 4, this time on three-days' rest. Melky Cabrera sparked the Yankees with four RBIs, including a two-run single in the 4th. Rodriguez added a two-run homer, tying a postseason record with RBIs in eight consecutive games. Damon put the game away with a two-run homer in the 8th, and the Yankees won 10–1, putting them one win away from their 40th American League pennant.

A. J. Burnett allowed four runs before recording an out in the bottom of the first inning of Game 5, but settled down soon thereafter. The Yankees rallied for 6 runs with two outs in the top of the 7th inning, including a 3-run double by Mark Teixeira, a game-tying single by Hideki Matsui, and a two-run triple by Robinson Canó. However, in the bottom half, the Angels rallied for 3 runs of their own to regain a 7–6 lead. Phil Hughes allowed a game-tying RBI single by Guerrero and a go-ahead RBI single to Kendry Morales. The Yankees threatened in the top of the 9th, but with two out and the bases loaded, Fuentes induced Nick Swisher to pop out to shortstop Erick Aybar on a 3–2 pitch to send the series back to New York.

In Game 6, Damon sparked the Yankees with a 2-run single in the bottom of the 4th to give the Yankees a lead that they would not relinquish. Pettitte hurled 6 1/3 strong innings, allowing only one earned run. Mariano Rivera came on in the 8th for a 6 out save, but allowed an RBI single to Guerrero to make it a 3–2 Yankee lead. It was the first postseason run allowed by Rivera at home since 2000, and the only one he would give up in the 2009 postseason. In the bottom half, errors by Kendrick and Scott Kazmir gave the Yankees two insurance runs, and Rivera shut the door in the 9th to give the Yankees their 40th American League pennant.

=== World Series ===
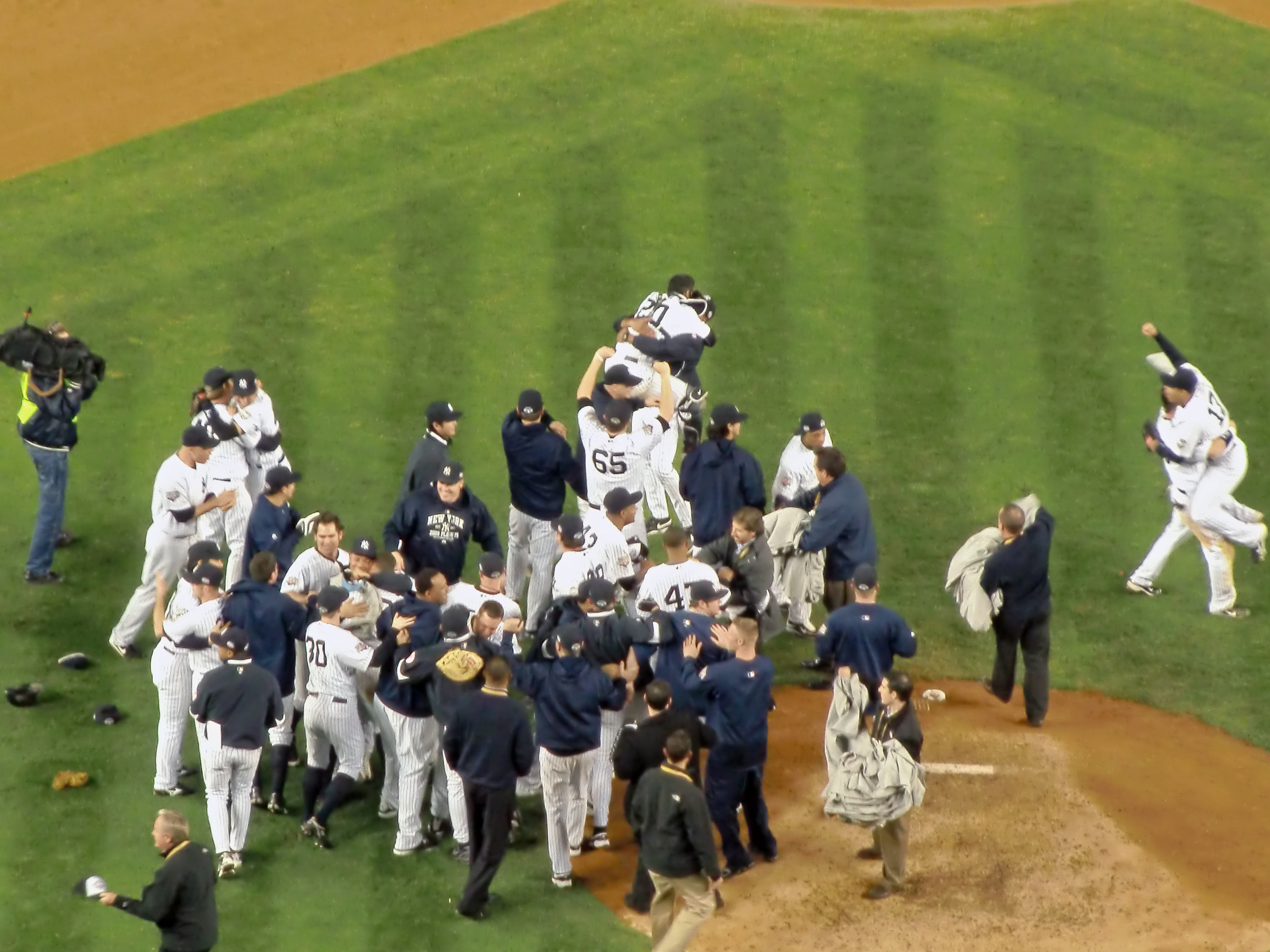
New York Yankees celebrate after their 7–3 win against the Philadelphia Phillies and win the franchise's 27th World Series championship.

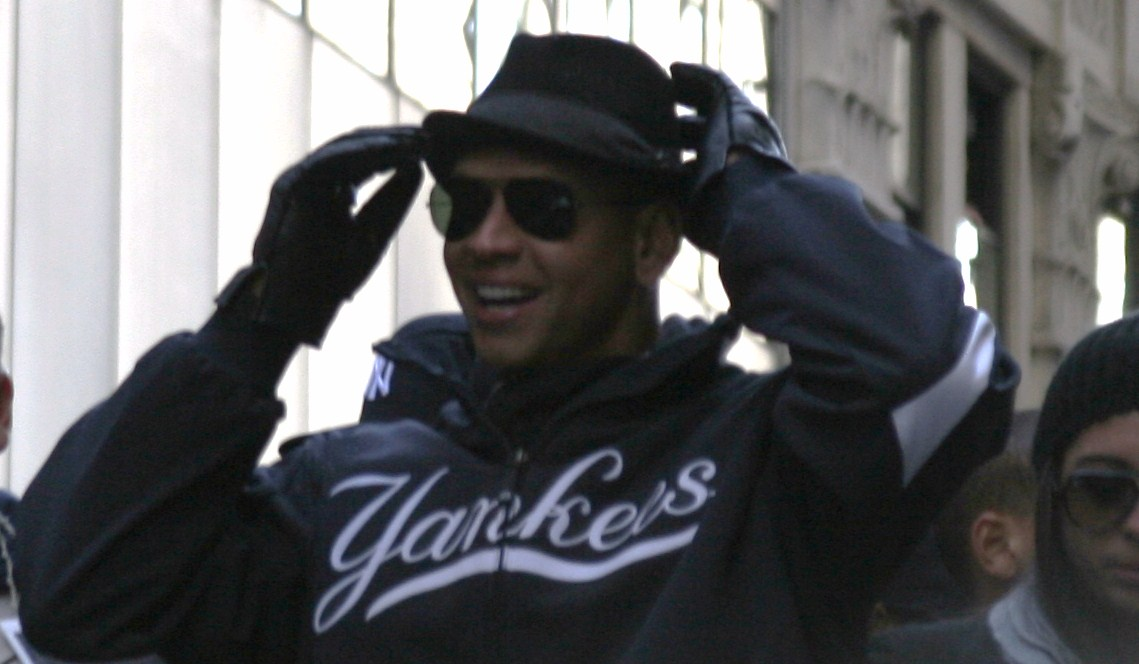
Yankees' third baseman Alex Rodriguez during the 2009 World Series parade.

The Yankees beat the Philadelphia Phillies in the 2009 World Series, 4 games to 2. The Phillies were playing for their second consecutive World Series title and 3rd overall, while the Yankees won their first title since 2000, and 27th overall. The two teams' previous postseason meeting came in the 1950 World Series, with the Yankees sweeping the Phillies. After Jimmy Rollins predicted that the Phillies would win the series in five games or "six if they were nice", the Yankees went on to win the series in six.

Cliff Lee shut down the Yankees in a complete game 6–1 victory for the Phillies in Game 1. The Yankees responded in Game 2 with a 3–1 win. Mark Teixeira and Hideki Matsui homered off Pedro Martínez, and A. J. Burnett pitched 7 great innings.

The Yankees won Game 3 behind 6 innings from Andy Pettitte, coupled with the first instant replay-overturned home run in World Series history by Alex Rodriguez and homers from Nick Swisher and Matsui.

In Game 4, the Yankees carried a 4–3 lead into the 8th inning. But with two out and no one on, Pedro Feliz lined a solo home run to left off Joba Chamberlain on a 3–2 pitch to tie the game. However, in the top of the 9th, Johnny Damon grinded out a nine pitch at-bat with two outs off Phillies closer Brad Lidge, lining a single to left center field. Damon then stole second base, and with the infield overshift on with Teixeira batting, Damon alertly stole an unoccupied third base. After Teixeira was hit by a pitch, Alex Rodriguez lined a double down the left field line to give the Yankees a 5–4 lead. Jorge Posada added two insurance runs thereafter, and Mariano Rivera pitched a perfect 9th to put the Yankees one win away from winning the series. The Yankees also lost Melky Cabrera for the remainder of the series, after he injured his hamstring running out a grounder in the sixth inning.

Burnett imploded in Game 5, allowing six earned runs in only two innings pitched. The Yankees rallied late, but fell short as the Phillies sent the series back to The Bronx with an 8–6 win.

Matsui earned the World Series MVP award thanks to his performance in Game 6. He became only the second player in baseball history to collect six RBI in a World Series game, finishing a triple short of the cycle. This included a two-run home run in the 2nd, a two-run single in the 3rd, and a two-run double in the 5th. Matsui finished the series with a .615 batting average with three home runs and 8 RBI. Pitching on three-days' rest, Pettitte earned his 4th win of the postseason, becoming the first pitcher in baseball history to start and win the clinching game of all rounds in a single postseason (Derek Lowe did the same in 2004 but with one of his wins coming in relief). Rivera recorded the final five outs to give the Yankees their 27th World Series Championship, by far the most in the history of baseball and the most in North American sports.

=== Game log ===
Legend
| Yankees win | Yankees loss | Game postponed |

2009 Postseason game log
ALDS vs. Minnesota Twins (Yankees win series 3–0)

| # | Date | Opponent | Score | Win | Loss | Save | Attendance | Record |
|---|---|---|---|---|---|---|---|---|
| 1 | October 7 | Twins | 7–2 | Sabathia (1–0) | Duensing (0–1) | | 49,464 | 1–0 |
| 2 | October 9 | Twins | 4–3 (11) | Robertson (1–0) | Mijares (0–1) | | 50,006 | 2–0 |
| 3 | October 11 | @ Twins | 4–1 | Pettitte (1–0) | Pavano (0–1) | Rivera (1) | 54,375 | 3–0 |

ALCS vs. Los Angeles Angels of Anaheim (Yankees win series 4–2)

| # | Date | Opponent | Score | Win | Loss | Save | Attendance | Record |
|---|---|---|---|---|---|---|---|---|
| 1 | October 16 | Angels | 4–1 | Sabathia (2–0) | Lackey (1–1) | Rivera (2) | 49,688 | 1–0 |
| 2 | October 17 | Angels | 4–3 (13) | Robertson (2–0) | Santana (0–1) | | 49,922 | 2–0 |
| 3 | October 19 | @ Angels | 5–4 (11) | Santana (1–1) | Aceves (0–1) | | 44,911 | 2–1 |
| 4 | October 20 | @ Angels | 10–1 | Sabathia (3–0) | Kazmir (0–1) | | 45,160 | 3–1 |
| 5 | October 22 | @ Angels | 7–6 | Jepsen (1–0) | Hughes (0–1) | Fuentes (1) | 45,113 | 3–2 |
| | October 24 | Angels | Postponed (rain). Rescheduled for October 25 | | | | | |
| 6 | October 25 | Angels | 5–2 | Pettitte (2–0) | Saunders (0–1) | Rivera (3) | 50,173 | 4–2 |

World Series vs. Philadelphia Phillies (Yankees win series 4–2)

| # | Date | Opponent | Score | Win | Loss | Save | Attendance | Record |
|---|---|---|---|---|---|---|---|---|
| 1 | October 28 | Phillies | 6–1 | Lee (3–0) | Sabathia (3–1) | | 50,027 | 0–1 |
| 2 | October 29 | Phillies | 3–1 | Burnett (1–0) | Martínez (0–1) | Rivera (4) | 50,181 | 1–1 |
| 3 | October 31 | @ Phillies | 8–5 | Pettitte (3–0) | Hamels (1–2) | | 46,061 | 2–1 |
| 4 | November 1 | @ Phillies | 7–4 | Chamberlain (1–0) | Lidge (0–1) | Rivera (5) | 46,145 | 3–1 |
| 5 | November 2 | @ Phillies | 8–6 | Lee (4–0) | Burnett (1–1) | Madson (1) | 46,178 | 3–2 |
| 6 | November 4 | Phillies | 7–3 | Pettitte (4–0) | Martínez (0–2) | | 50,315 | 4–2 |

== Player stats ==
Note: Team leader in each category is noted in bold

Note: * = League leader in category.

=== Batting ===
Note: G = Games played; AB = At bats; R = Runs scored; H = Hits; 2B = Doubles; 3B = Triples; HR = Home runs; RBI = Runs batted in; BB = Walks; AVG = Batting average; SB = Stolen bases

| Player | G | AB | R | H | 2B | 3B | HR | RBI | BB | AVG | SB |
|---|---|---|---|---|---|---|---|---|---|---|---|
| Ángel Berroa | 21 | 22 | 6 | 3 | 1 | 0 | 0 | 1 | 0 | .136 | 0 |
| Melky Cabrera | 154 | 485 | 66 | 133 | 28 | 1 | 13 | 68 | 43 | .274 | 10 |
| Robinson Canó | **161*** | **637** | 103 | 204 | **48** | 2 | 25 | 85 | 30 | .320 | 5 |
| Kevin Cash | 10 | 26 | 1 | 6 | 2 | 0 | 0 | 3 | 0 | .231 | 0 |
| Francisco Cervelli | 42 | 94 | 13 | 28 | 4 | 0 | 1 | 11 | 2 | .298 | 0 |
| Johnny Damon | 143 | 550 | **107** | 155 | 36 | 3 | 24 | 82 | 71 | .282 | 12 |
| Shelley Duncan | 11 | 15 | 1 | 3 | 0 | 0 | 0 | 1 | 0 | .200 | 0 |
| Brett Gardner | 108 | 248 | 48 | 67 | 6 | **6** | 3 | 23 | 26 | .270 | 26 |
| Freddy Guzmán | 10 | 6 | 2 | 1 | 0 | 0 | 0 | 1 | 0 | .167 | 4 |
| Jerry Hairston Jr. | 45 | 76 | 15 | 18 | 5 | 0 | 2 | 12 | 11 | .237 | 0 |
| Eric Hinske | 39 | 84 | 13 | 19 | 3 | 0 | 7 | 14 | 10 | .226 | 1 |
| Derek Jeter | 153 | 634 | **107** | **212** | 27 | 1 | 18 | 66 | 72 | **.334** | **30** |
| Hideki Matsui | 142 | 456 | 62 | 125 | 21 | 1 | 28 | 90 | 64 | .274 | 0 |
| Juan Miranda | 8 | 9 | 2 | 3 | 0 | 0 | 1 | 3 | 0 | .333 | 0 |
| José Molina | 52 | 138 | 15 | 30 | 4 | 0 | 1 | 11 | 14 | .217 | 0 |
| Xavier Nady | 7 | 28 | 4 | 8 | 4 | 0 | 0 | 2 | 1 | .286 | 0 |
| Ramiro Peña | 69 | 115 | 17 | 33 | 6 | 1 | 1 | 10 | 5 | .287 | 4 |
| Jorge Posada | 111 | 383 | 55 | 109 | 25 | 0 | 22 | 81 | 48 | .285 | 1 |
| Cody Ransom | 31 | 79 | 11 | 15 | 9 | 1 | 0 | 10 | 7 | .190 | 2 |
| Alex Rodriguez | 124 | 444 | 78 | 127 | 17 | 1 | 30 | 100 | 80 | .286 | 14 |
| Nick Swisher | 150 | 498 | 84 | 124 | 35 | 1 | 29 | 82 | **97** | .249 | 0 |
| Mark Teixeira | 156 | 609 | 103 | 178 | 43 | 3 | **39*** | **122*** | 81 | .292 | 2 |
| Pitcher totals | 162 | 24 | 2 | 3 | 1 | 0 | 0 | 3 | 1 | .125 | 0 |
| **Team totals** | **162** | **5660** | **915** | **1604** | **325** | **21** | **244** | **831** | **663** | **.283** | **111** |

=== Pitching ===
Note: W = Wins; L = Losses; ERA = Earned run average; G = Games pitched; GS = Games started; CG = Complete games SV = Saves; IP = Innings pitched; H = Hits allowed; R = Runs allowed; ER = Earned runs allowed; BB = Walks allowed; K = Strikeouts

| Player | W | L | ERA | G | GS | CG | SV | IP | H | R | ER | BB | K |
|---|---|---|---|---|---|---|---|---|---|---|---|---|---|
| Alfredo Aceves | 10 | 1 | 3.54 | 43 | 1 | 0 | 1 | 84.0 | 69 | 36 | 33 | 16 | 69 |
| Jonathan Albaladejo | 5 | 1 | 5.24 | 33 | 0 | 0 | 0 | 34.1 | 41 | 23 | 20 | 16 | 21 |
| Brian Bruney | 5 | 0 | 3.92 | 44 | 0 | 0 | 0 | 39.0 | 36 | 17 | 17 | 23 | 36 |
| A. J. Burnett | 13 | **9** | 4.04 | 33 | 33 | 1 | 0 | 207.0 | 193 | 99 | **93** | **97*** | 195 |
| Joba Chamberlain | 9 | 6 | 4.75 | 32 | 31 | 0 | 0 | 157.1 | 167 | 94 | 83 | 76 | 133 |
| Anthony Claggett | 0 | 0 | 33.75 | 2 | 0 | 0 | 0 | 2.2 | 11 | 10 | 10 | 4 | 3 |
| Phil Coke | 4 | 3 | 4.50 | **72** | 0 | 0 | 2 | 60.0 | 44 | 34 | 30 | 20 | 49 |
| Michael Dunn | 0 | 0 | 6.75 | 4 | 0 | 0 | 0 | 4.0 | 3 | 3 | 3 | 5 | 5 |
| Chad Gaudin | 2 | 0 | 3.43 | 11 | 6 | 0 | 0 | 42.0 | 41 | 16 | 16 | 20 | 34 |
| Phil Hughes | 8 | 3 | 3.03 | 51 | 7 | 0 | 3 | 86.0 | 68 | 31 | 29 | 28 | 96 |
| Ian Kennedy | 0 | 0 | 0.00 | 1 | 0 | 0 | 0 | 1.0 | 0 | 0 | 0 | 2 | 1 |
| Dámaso Marte | 1 | 3 | 9.45 | 21 | 0 | 0 | 0 | 13.1 | 15 | 14 | 14 | 6 | 13 |
| Mark Melancon | 0 | 1 | 3.86 | 13 | 0 | 0 | 0 | 16.1 | 13 | 8 | 7 | 10 | 10 |
| Sergio Mitre | 3 | 3 | 6.79 | 12 | 9 | 0 | 0 | 51.2 | 71 | 45 | 39 | 13 | 32 |
| Andy Pettitte | 14 | 8 | 4.16 | 32 | 32 | 0 | 0 | 194.2 | 193 | **101** | 90 | 76 | 148 |
| Edwar Ramírez | 0 | 0 | 5.73 | 20 | 0 | 0 | 0 | 22.0 | 25 | 15 | 14 | 18 | 22 |
| Mariano Rivera | 3 | 3 | 1.76 | 66 | 0 | 0 | **44** | 66.1 | 48 | 14 | 13 | 12 | 72 |
| David Robertson | 2 | 1 | 3.30 | 45 | 0 | 0 | 1 | 43.2 | 36 | 19 | 16 | 23 | 63 |
| CC Sabathia | **19*** | 8 | **3.37** | 34 | **34** | **2** | 0 | **230.0** | **197** | 96 | 86 | 67 | **197** |
| Nick Swisher | 0 | 0 | 0.00 | 1 | 0 | 0 | 0 | 1.0 | 1 | 0 | 0 | 1 | 1 |
| Brett Tomko | 1 | 2 | 5.23 | 15 | 0 | 0 | 0 | 20.2 | 19 | 12 | 12 | 7 | 11 |
| Josh Towers | 0 | 0 | 3.38 | 2 | 0 | 0 | 0 | 5.1 | 6 | 3 | 2 | 1 | 2 |
| José Veras | 3 | 1 | 5.96 | 25 | 0 | 0 | 0 | 25.2 | 23 | 17 | 17 | 14 | 18 |
| Chien-Ming Wang | 1 | 6 | 9.64 | 12 | 9 | 0 | 0 | 42.0 | 66 | 46 | 45 | 19 | 29 |
| **Team totals** | **103** | **59** | **4.26** | **162** | **162** | **3** | **51** | **1450.0** | **1386** | **753** | **687** | **574** | **1260** |

Source:2009 New York Yankees team stats at Baseball Reference

== Farm system ==
| Level | Team | League | Manager |
|---|---|---|---|
| AAA | Scranton/Wilkes-Barre Yankees | International League | Dave Miley |
| AA | Trenton Thunder | Eastern League | Tony Franklin |
| A | Tampa Yankees | Florida State League | Luis Sojo |
| A | Charleston RiverDogs | South Atlantic League | Torre Tyson |
| A-Short Season | Staten Island Yankees | New York–Penn League | Josh Paul |
| Rookie | GCL Yankees | Gulf Coast League | Jody Reed |

LEAGUE CHAMPIONS: Tampa Yankees and Staten Island Yankees.
