= Consolación del Sur Municipal Museum =

Museum in Cuba

- Museo Municipal de Consolación del Sur
- Established: 14 December 1979
- Location: Consolación del Sur, Cuba

Consolación del Sur Municipal Museum is a museum located in the 62nd street in Consolación del Sur, Cuba. It was established as a museum on 14 December 1979.

The museum holds 10 sections (numismatics, sports, history, arts, documents among others). Currently, it is closed.

== See also ==
- List of museums in Cuba
