= Juan Miranda (baseball) =

Cuban baseball player (born 1983)

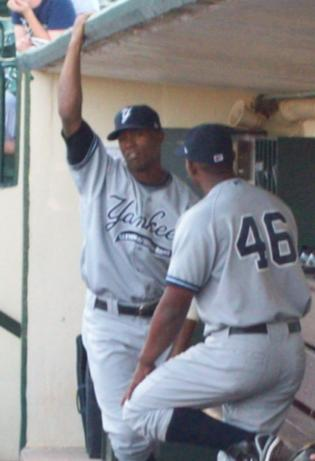
- First baseman
- Born: 25 April 1983 (age 43); Consolación del Sur, Cuba
- Batted: Left Threw: Left

Professional debut
- MLB: 18 September, 2008, for the New York Yankees
- NPB: 28 March, 2014, for the Hokkaido Nippon-Ham Fighters

Last appearance
- MLB: 9 July, 2011, for the Arizona Diamondbacks
- NPB: 5 October, 2014, for the Hokkaido Nippon-Ham Fighters

MLB statistics (through 2011 season)
- Batting average: .226
- Home runs: 11
- Runs batted in: 37

NPB statistics (through 2014 season)
- Batting average: .227
- Home runs: 14
- Runs batted in: 57
- Stats at Baseball Reference

Teams
- New York Yankees (2008–2010); Arizona Diamondbacks (2011); Hokkaido Nippon-Ham Fighters (2014)

Juan Miguel Miranda Ramírez (born 25 April 1983) is a Cuban former first baseman. He played in Major League Baseball (MLB) for the New York Yankees and the Arizona Diamondbacks and in Nippon Professional Baseball (NPB) for the Hokkaido Nippon-Ham Fighters.

Listed at 6 ft 0 in (1.83 m) and 220 lb (100 kg), Miranda batted and threw left handed. He was born in Consolación del Sur, Pinar del Río Province.

== Baseball career ==
=== Cuban career ===
Miranda batted .303 with 27 homers for the Vegueros de Pinar del Río club in Cuba's Serie Nacional from 2002 to 2004. In addition, he was included on the Cuban national team from 2001 to 2004.

Miranda defected to the Dominican Republic in early 2004, on his seventh attempt. He was granted citizenship there in 2005.

=== New York Yankees ===
Miranda signed a four-year contract with the New York Yankees worth $2 million on 12 December 2006. He spent the 2007 season with their Single-A affiliate Tampa Yankees and Double-A Trenton Thunder, then played in the Arizona Fall League after the season.

He reached Triple-A in 2008, hitting .287 with 12 home runs and 52 RBI in 99 games with the Scranton Wilkes-Barre Yankees. On 16 September, Miranda was called up by the Yankees for the first time in his career. He made his major league debut on 18 September, walking twice, and collected his first hit on 24 September. After the season, Miranda played in the Arizona Fall League.

In 2009, he was called up on 17 April as a replacement for David Robertson, but was sent back down the following day. He hit .290 with 19 home runs and 82 RBI in 122 games for Scranton and was promoted on 18 September, following the team's loss in the International League finals. Miranda recorded a game-winning walk-off single against the Kansas City Royals on 29 September. He hit his first Major League home run on 2 October, against the Tampa Bay Rays.

Miranda once again started the season in Triple-A, hitting .260 with five homers and 15 RBI before he was called up to the majors on 13 May. He hit .217 with two homers and seven RBI before he was optioned back to Scranton when Jorge Posada returned from the disabled list. Miranda hit .291 with 10 homers and 25 RBIs in 49 games before he was called back up on 16 July. Following the acquisition of Lance Berkman and Austin Kearns at the trade deadline, he was sent back down to Triple-A. The Yankees did not call up Miranda again until 12 September. On 26 September, he drew a bases loaded walk off Hideki Okajima in the bottom of the 10th inning to force in the winning run against the Boston Red Sox.

=== Arizona Diamondbacks ===
On 18 November 2010, Miranda was traded to the Arizona Diamondbacks for minor leaguer Scott Allen. In 65 games for Arizona, Miranda batted .213/.315/.402 with seven home runs and 23 RBI. On 15 July 2011, Miranda was outrighted off of the roster and assigned to the Triple-A Reno Aces.

=== Tampa Bay Rays ===
On 6 December 2011, Miranda signed a minor league contract with the Tampa Bay Rays, which included an invitation to spring training. He hit just .187 with two home runs and eight RBI in Triple-A with the Durham Bulls and was released on 9 June 2012.

=== Vaqueros Laguna ===
On 27 June 2012, Miranda signed with the Vaqueros Laguna of the Mexican League. He hit .423/.528/.676 with four home runs and 17 RBI in 20 games. Miranda returned for the 2013 season, and hit .367/.498/.633 with 26 home runs and 86 RBI in 107 games on his way to the LMB All-Star Game.

=== Hokkaido Nippon-Ham Fighters ===
On 30 October 2013, Miranda signed with the Hokkaido Nippon-Ham Fighters of Nippon Professional Baseball. On the season, Miranda hit for an average of .227 in 116 games with 42 walks and 14 home runs, but struck out 108 times in 427 plate appearances.

=== Return to Mexican League ===
On 2 April 2015, Miranda returned to the Vaqueros Laguna. He hit 13 home runs with 73 RBI and a batting line of .315/.468/.486 in 101 contests. He was a LMB All-Star in 2015.

On 14 January 2016, Miranda was traded to the Diablos Rojos del México. Miranda was then traded to the Guerreros de Oaxaca on 17 February. On 21 April, he was released by Oaxaca. In 16 games he hit .232/.394/.339 with 1 home run, 8 RBIs and 1 stolen base.

On 17 May, Miranda signed with the Saraperos de Saltillo. He was released on 15 July. In 44 games he hit .287/.385/.490 with 6 home runs, 18 RBIs and 1 stolen base.

Miranda signed with the Bravos de León of the Mexican League on 30 May 2017. He was released on 1 July. In 22 games he hit .288/.424/.411 with 2 home runs and 19 RBIs.

== See also ==
- List of baseball players who defected from Cuba
