= Entronque de Herradura =

- Village
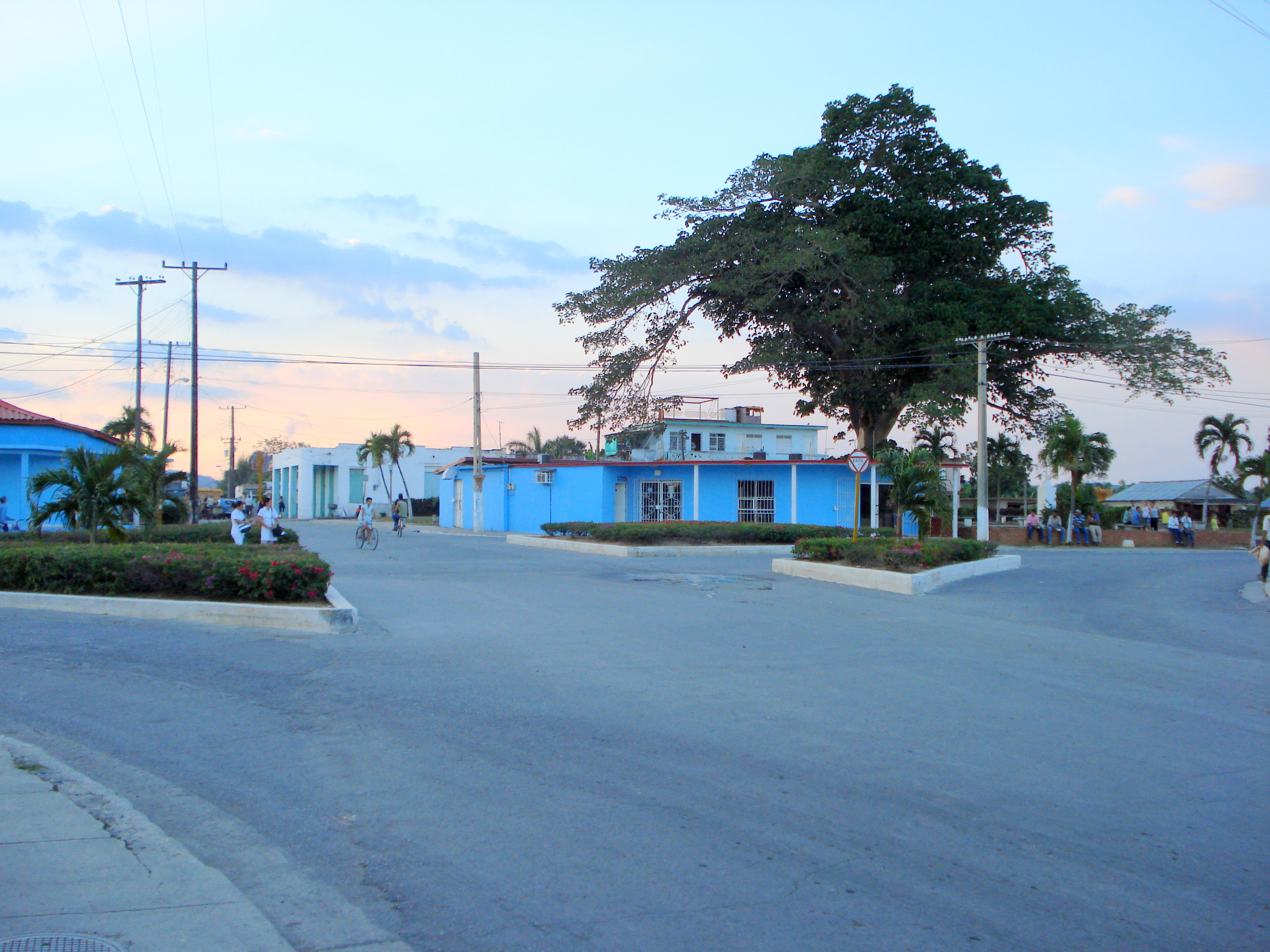
- Nickname: Little Miami
- Location of Entronque de Herradura in Cuba
- Coordinates: 22°34′25″N 83°27′09″W
- Country: Cuba
- Province: Pinar del Río
- Municipality: Consolación del Sur
- Settled: 1907
- District: 1988

Area
  - Total: 1.280 km^{2} (0.494 sq mi)
- Elevation: 71 m (233 ft)

Population
  - Total: 6,086
  - Density: 4,755/km^{2} (12,320/sq mi)
  - Demonym: Entronqueño
- Time zone: UTC-5 (EST)
  - Summer (DST): UTC-4 (EDT)
- Postal code: 24490
- Area code: +53-48

Entronque de Herradura is one of thirteen villages and consejo popular ("people's council", i.e. hamlet) belonging to the municipality of Consolación del Sur, in Pinar del Río Province, Cuba. It has a land extension of 1.280 km² (0.494 square of miles).

== History ==
In 1907, Arturo García, known as Arturo Miseria, purchased the quadrants or corners of the Herradura estate, which at the time belonged to the American Thomas Hodgkiss Hamsx Silson. He built the first house in the community, using yagua and guano, in the southwest quadrant. Later, in 1908, Jaime Galcerán acquired the northwest quadrant and constructed a house made of wood and Creole tiles.

In 1910, Leonardo Cairo acquired the southwest quadrant and built a home to which he added a pharmacy. By the following year, the community had its first teacher, Mrs. Manuela Sánchez, who founded the first school. She taught both boys and girls from grades one through six. Between 1909 and 1911, during the presidency of José Miguel Gómez, the paving of the royal road began with the cooperation of all the neighbors, each responsible for a specific section. Stones were moved or carried by hand, horse-drawn carts, and wagons, and they were placed and compacted using a roller, the only machine available at the time.

In 1918, Julián Díaz acquired the northeast quadrant and built his home there. A few years later, he decided to move to kilometer 3 on the road to Herradura, leaving the house to a brother-in-law, and eventually sold it. By 1922, the town of Entronque de Herradura was owned by four prominent individuals, each controlling one of the quadrants as follows: the northwest quadrant belonged to Caridad Díaz; the northeast quadrant to Julián Díaz; the southwest quadrant to Lauro Pérez; and the southeast quadrant to Leonardo Cairo.

In 1929, the town received the good news that the cobbled road would soon be paved, marking the arrival of the first highway and technological advancements to the western part of the island. Starting in 1931, with the construction of the Carretera Central, the landscape began to change dramatically, as businesses and housing multiplied.

In 1947, the community unveiled its first bust of José Martí. Electric service reached the town in 1949, bringing progress for the entire community, including public and residential lighting. It also enabled technological advances at the Galcerán preserves factory, which allowed for the processing of all raw materials from the area. Additionally, the town saw the creation of a cinema, carpentry workshops, and new sawmills.

Communication with San Andrés did not occur before 1959; the only connection was the royal road, which became impassable during the rainy season.

== Geography ==
It covers the northeast part of Consolación del Sur, bordered on the north by the municipality of La Palma and Los Palacios, east of Canal, on the south by the border of Herradura, by the West with the district of Crucero de Echeverria.

=== Relief ===
The predominant relief consists of elevations interspersed with some flat portions in the southern part of the region.

=== Climate ===
The climatic conditions of the territory align with those of the country, characterized by a tropical humid climate with two well-defined seasons: a dry season and a rainy season. The dry season extends from November to April, while the rainy season lasts from May to October, with June being the rainiest month and December the driest. The average temperature is 24.7 degrees Celsius, with January being the coldest month and August the warmest.

=== Hydrography ===
The Patate Reservoir is located three kilometers southwest of the town of Entronque de Herradura. It has a surface area of 7.5 km² and a water volume of 44.7 million cubic meters, damming the waters of the Santa Clara River.

== Demographic ==
Its population is 9,187 inhabitants with a density of 181.2 inhabitants per km². The population is distributed as follows: 7,428 live in the urban area, accounting for 78.8%, and 1,987 in the rural area, representing 21.1%. Of the latter, 271 live in the mountain plan, which represents 13.6% of the rural sector and 2.87% of the total. The housing stock is 3,349; of these, 77.39% are urban and 22.6% are rural. Of the latter, 13.4% are in the mountain plan.

== Economy ==
The economy of Entronque de Herradura is primarily based on agriculture and related activities. The majority of the territory is cultivable, supporting the production of various crops such as tobacco, root vegetables, vegetables, and fruits. Small-scale animal husbandry, including pigs, poultry, and minor livestock, also contributes to local food supply and commerce.

In addition to these activities, the community hosts a feed factory that supports agricultural productivity and local industry. Small agricultural infrastructure, including family farms and organoponic systems, helps improve output and provides food for local consumption. Local commerce revolves around the sale of agricultural products, basic goods, and foodstuffs, while informal exchanges and transport methods, such as horse-drawn carriages and electric motorcycles, facilitate daily economic activity.

Despite challenges related to limited infrastructure, access to agricultural inputs, and broader national economic difficulties, Entronque de Herradura remains an important agricultural hub in the region.

=== Natural Resources ===
The primary natural resource in this municipality is its land, covering a territorial area of 59.84 km², of which 81% is arable. The main agricultural products include various crops such as tobacco, tubers, vegetables, fruits, and produce from an organoponic system designed to supply the local population. Additionally, the area has a feed factory, contributing significantly to agricultural and industrial productivity.

== Culture ==
=== Recreational Club ===
As the town grew, the need for a recreation club became apparent. In 1955, Jaimito Galcerán donated the land for its construction. From that point forward, activities such as fairs, raffles, parades, and other events were organized. Membership was open to adults of white ethnicity. Recreational activities included dominoes, dice games, ping pong, weightlifting, and gastronomic services.

=== Cinema ===
The first and only cinema was built in 1950 in the southwest quadrant by Lauro Pérez and Joseíto García, on a lot donated by the latter. The theater, named “Teatro Adelfa”, was inaugurated by Armando Díaz. Screenings were held daily, with tickets priced at $0.20 for adults and $0.10 for children.

== Education ==
Education developed alongside the town’s growth. In 1911, Manuela Sánchez established the first school, teaching boys and girls from first to sixth grade. By 1934, due to population growth, Berta Díaz began teaching, leading to the opening of a second school. From then on, Manuela taught girls while Berta taught boys, both covering grades one through six.

In 1947, Tusnelda Geada created a first-grade classroom, which later evolved into a small school in 1953. In 1948, Digna Valdés joined Berta Díaz in teaching until a new classroom was established for fourth, fifth, and sixth grades. By 1953, a school exclusively for first and second grades was created.

Today, the Entronque de Herradura community has seven primary schools spread across urban and rural areas, and almost all of them face critical challenges due to limited infrastructure and resources. The largest, Sierra Maestra, is located in the southeast quadrant, just 180 meters from the town center on the road to Herradura, and was recently renovated after sustaining damage from hurricanes. René Anillo is the town’s only mixed secondary and pre-university center, serving 410 students with a maximum capacity of 500. Located approximately 1.77 kilometers from the center, students frequently make this journey on foot, by horse-drawn carriages, or on electric motorcycles

== Health ==
Historically, the community had two pharmacies. The first was built in 1910 by Leonardo Cairo, a well-educated man with a degree in pharmacy. In 1922, Pedro Miranda, another pharmacist, opened a second pharmacy. By the 1930s, the town had its first doctor, Agustín Delgado Díaz, followed by another known as Gargallo. However, conflicts between doctors and pharmacists often led to short tenures, forcing residents to seek medical care in Consolación del Sur or request house visits.

Currently, the community has two pharmacies, thirteen medical offices, and one polyclinic.

== Religious Beliefs ==
The main religious groups in the community are Jehovah’s Witnesses and Methodists.

== See also ==
- List of places in Cuba
- Municipalities of Cuba
- The Giant of Herradura
