= Consolación del Sur =

Consolacion del Sur Municipality Municipio de Consolacion del Sur
- Municipality
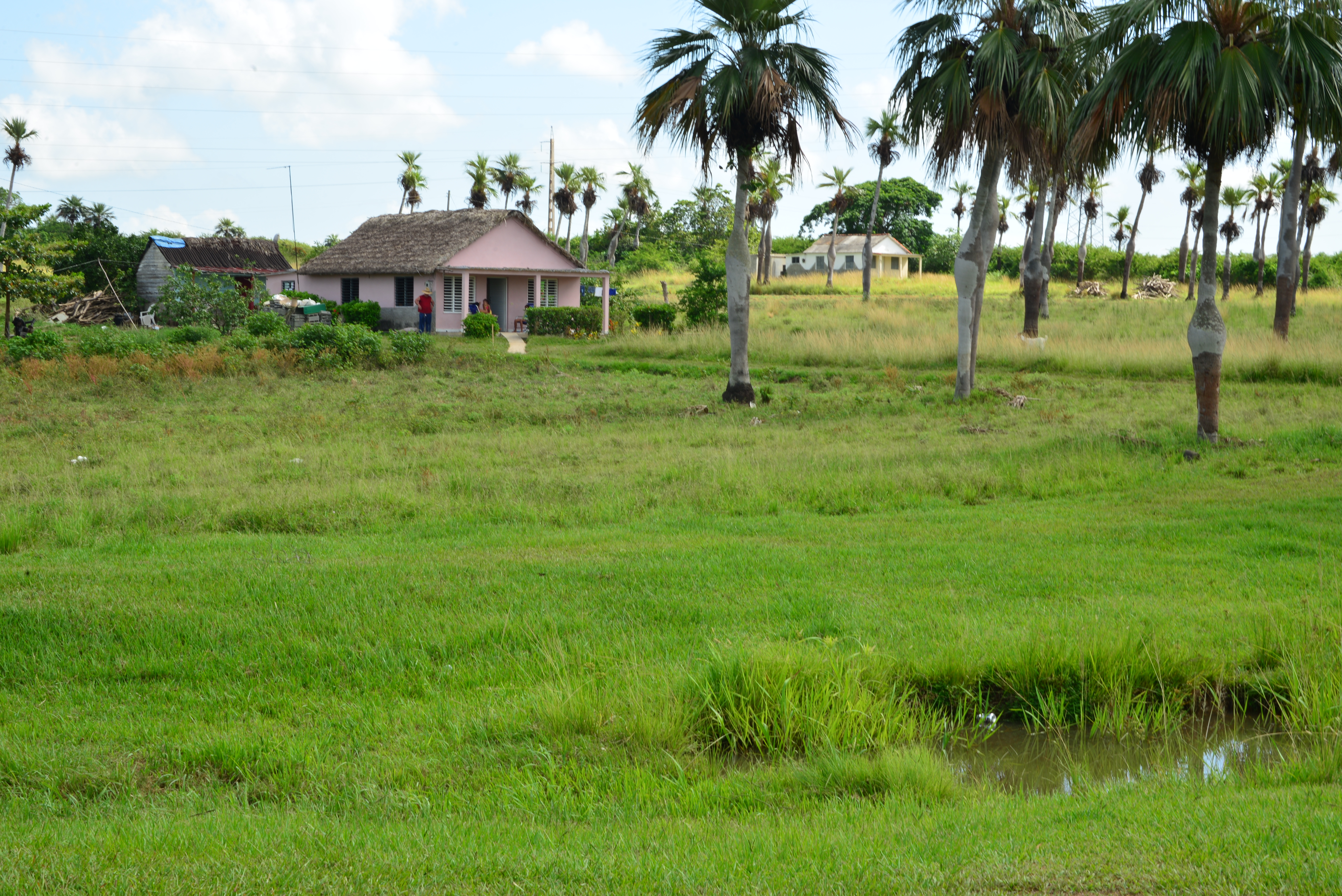

- Coat of arms
- Nickname: Athens of Vueltabajo
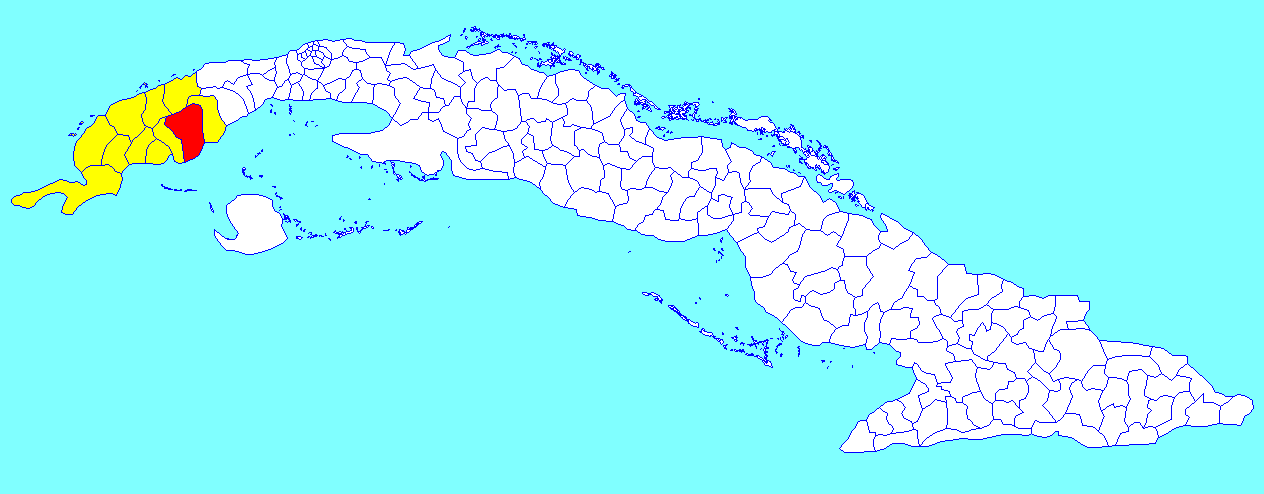
- Consolación del Sur municipality (red) within Pinar del Río Province (yellow) and Cuba
- Coordinates: 22°30′30″N 83°31′2″W
- Country: Cuba
- Province: Pinar del Río
- Founded: 1690
- Established: 1865

Area
  - Total: 1,111.9 km^{2} (429.3 sq mi)
- Elevation: 65 m (213 ft)

Population (2015)
  - Total: 117,551
  - Density: 1,866/km^{2} (4,830/sq mi)
- Time zone: UTC-5 (EST)
- Area code: +53-48
- Website: https://www.consolaciondelsur.gob.cu:

Consolación del Sur is a municipality and town in the Pinar del Río Province of Cuba. Also called the Athens of Vueltabajo, it was founded in 1690.

== Geography ==
It is located in a major rice-growing area; tobacco is also cultivated as in much of the Pinar del Río Province.

Wards (consejos populares) of the municipality include Villa I, Villa II, Pueblo Nuevo, Arroyo de Agua, Crucero de Echevarría, El Canal, Entronque de Herradura, Herradura, Entronque de Pilotos, Pilotos, Puerta de Golpe, and Alonso Rojas.

== Demographics ==
In 2004, the municipality of Consolación del Sur had a population of 87,500. With a total area of 1,112 km^{2} (429 sq mi), it has a population density of 78.7/km^{2} (204/sq mi).

== Attractions ==
There are three churches in this town, one Roman Catholic parish (dedicated to "Nuestra Señora de la Candelaria", or Our Lady of the Purification) and two Protestant churches. The town has two parks; the Catholic church is near the central park. There is also the Consolación del Sur Municipal Museum.

== Notable people ==
- Aracelio Iglesias (1901–1948), labor leader, trade unionist, and dockworker
- Willy Chirino (b. 1947), Cuban-American musician
- Juan Miranda (b. 1983), baseball player
- Diosmely Peña (b. 1985), athlete

== See also ==
- Municipalities of Cuba
- List of cities in Cuba
